= William Douglas Burden =

American naturalist and author (1898–1978)

W. Douglas Burden
- Born: William Douglas Burden; September 24, 1898; Troy, New York, US
- Died: November 14, 1978 (aged 80); Charlotte, Vermont, US
- Education: Harvard University; Columbia University
- Spouses: Katherine Curtin White (m. 1924, divorced) Elizabeth Chace Gammack (m. 1940, divorced) Jeanne Wells Wight Booth (m. 1971)
- Parent(s): James A. Burden Jr. Florence Adele Sloane
- Relatives: James A. Burden III (brother); Arthur Scott Burden (uncle); William D. Sloane (grandfather); Emily Thorn Vanderbilt (grandmother); Sage Sohier (granddaughter); Doug Burden (grandson)

William Douglas Burden (September 24, 1898 – November 14, 1978), was an American naturalist, filmmaker, and author who co-founded Marineland in Florida.

== Early life ==
Photograph of William (right), his father James and elder brother, by Arnold Genthe, 1914

Burden was born on September 24, 1898, in Troy, New York, but grew up in Manhattan, where the family lived at 7 East 91st Street in a home designed by Warren & Wetmore. He was the second son of James Abercrombie Burden Jr. (1871–1932) and Florence Adele Sloane (1873–1960). His older brother was James Abercrombie Burden III, and his younger sister was Florence "Sheila" Burden (the wife of Blake Leigh Lawrence, a descendant of the Chanler, Winthrop, and Astor families). After his father's death in 1932, his mother remarried in 1936 to Richard M. Tobin, a banker who had been the American Minister to the Netherlands under President Calvin Coolidge.

His father's family had organized and ran the Burden Iron Works in Troy, of which his father served as president from 1906 until his death. His paternal grandparents were Mary Proudfit (née Irvin) Burden (daughter of Richard Irvin) and James Abercrombie Burden (son of Henry Burden). His uncle, Arthur Scott Burden, was the first husband of Cynthia Roche (the daughter of the 3rd Baron Fermoy and Frances Ellen Work, and a sister of the 4th Baron Fermoy, a grandfather of Diana, Princess of Wales). His sister, Adele Burden Lawrence, married the prominent writer Louis Stanton Auchincloss. His maternal grandparents were William D. Sloane, the head of W. & J. Sloane, and Emily Thorn Vanderbilt (a daughter of William Henry Vanderbilt and granddaughter of Cornelius Vanderbilt). His aunt was Emily Vanderbilt Sloane.

Burden graduated with an A.B. degree from Harvard College in 1922, followed by a master's degree from Columbia University in 1926. In 1922, John Singer Sargent did a charcoal portrait of Burden.

== Career ==
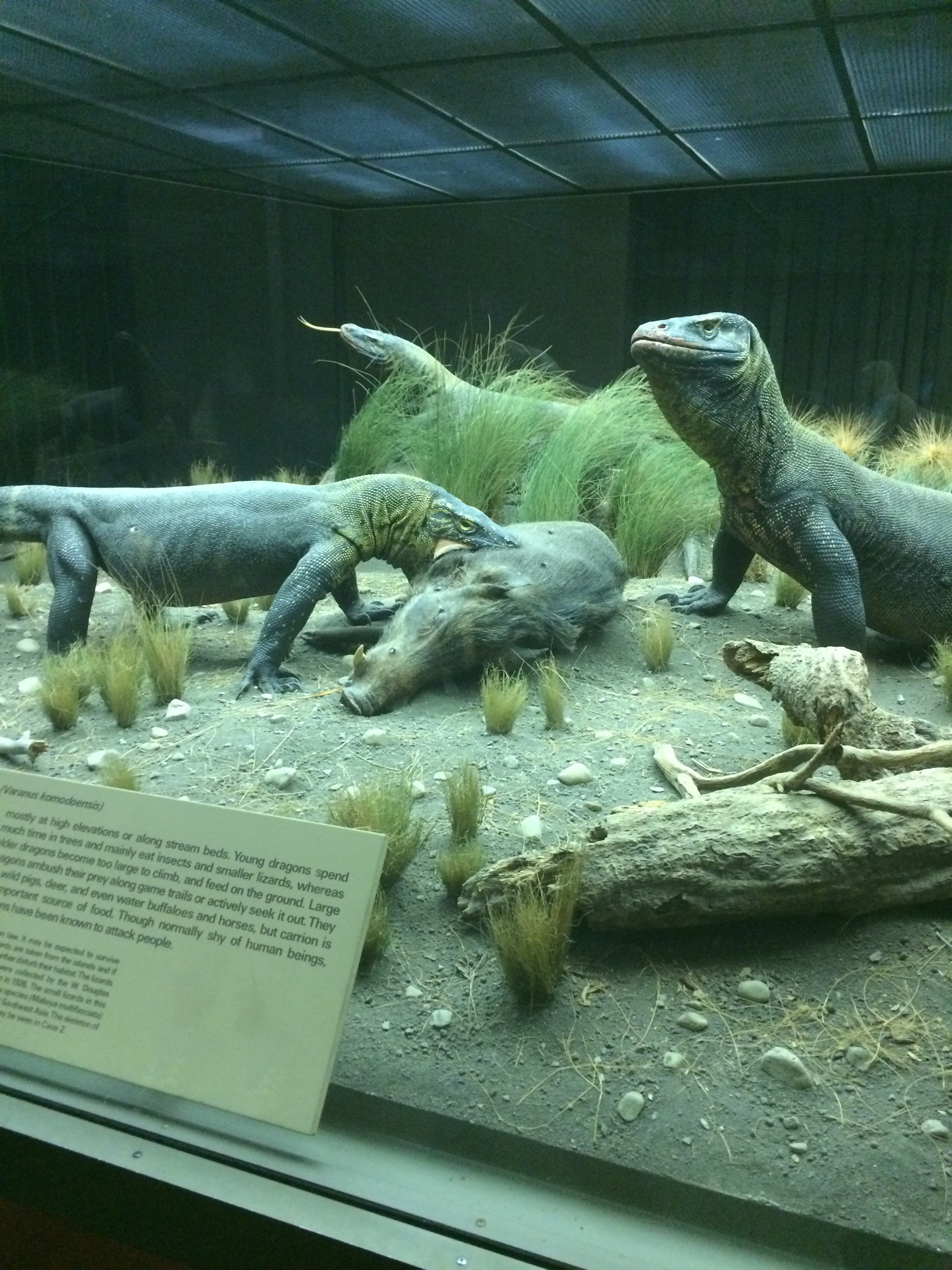
The Komodo dragon diorama in the Hall of Reptiles and Amphibians at the American Museum of Natural History.

Shortly after graduating from Harvard, Burden went to the Far East on an expedition to bring back specimens for the American Museum of Natural History which led to the establishment of the Department of Animal Behavior in 1928. He was elected to the board of trustees of the museum in 1926.

He led expeditions to various tropical islands and the Arctic, but his most well known expedition was to the Island of Komodo in the Dutch East Indies in 1926. Along with his first wife Catherine and their party, he went looking for the Komodo dragon (Varanus komodoensis), which the New York Times called a "fierce direct descendant of the dinosaur". By using sapling traps baited with buffalo meat, Burden was the first "white man" to find and trap the giant lizards which weighed 350 pounds and were approximately 10 feet long. They also collected 3,000 insect and amphibian specimens. Of the three Komodo dragons they captured, two were given to the Bronx Zoo, but died soon thereafter and were mounted in the new Hall of Reptiles and Amphibians at the museum.

In 1930, he co-wrote and produced, with William Chanler as part of Burden-Chanler Productions, the silent film entitled The Silent Enemy starring Chief Buffalo Child Long Lance and Chauncey Yellow Robe.

Along with Cornelius Vanderbilt Whitney, Sherman Pratt, and Ilya Andreyevich Tolstoy (grandson of Leo Tolstoy), Burden founded and served as president of Marineland, one of Florida's first marine mammal parks in St. Augustine, Florida in 1938. The park was conceived as an oceanarium that could be used to film marine life.

During World War II, he developed a shark repellent for the U.S. Navy.

=== Published works ===
In 1927, he wrote a book about the expedition to Komodo Island entitled The Dragon Lizards of Komodo. Burden's chapter "The Komodo Dragon"—in his book Look to the Wilderness, published in 1956—describes the expedition, the habitat, and the behavior of the dragon. In 1960, Burden wrote Book to the Wilderness.

== Personal life ==
Burden was married three times, with his first and second marriage ending in divorce. His first marriage was to Katherine Curtin White (1902–1976), a daughter of Ernest Ingersol White and Katharine Curtin (née Sage) White, in 1924. Her uncle, Horace White, had been Governor of New York in 1910. Before their divorce, they lived at East 72nd Street in Manhattan and were the parents of:

- Katharine Sage "Wendy" Burden (b. 1927), who married Walter Denegre Sohier. They divorced and she married the journalist Edward P. Morgan.
- William Douglas Burden Jr. (1931–2008), who was one of America's top ski racers, competing internationally, until a near-fatal ski racing accident in Italy in 1954 ended his career. His life partner was Marilyn Hodges Wilmerding.
- Andrew White Burden (b. 1935), who married Meta Craig Paumgarten, a daughter of Harald Paumgarten, in 1962. His wife died in a tragic avalanche on the back of Ajax in 1972.

After their divorce, Katherine married Dan Platt Caulkins (who had previously been married to a daughter of banker Seward Prosser) in 1939. He married secondly to Elizabeth (née Chace) Gammack (1911–2013) in 1940. Elizabeth was a daughter of Malcolm Greene Chace and the former wife of Thomas Hubbard Gammack. Before their divorce, they were the parents of one son, Christopher Burden.

After their divorce, Elizabeth married Grenville Temple Emmet (a son of diplomat Grenville T. Emmet) in 1973. His third, and final, marriage was in 1971 to Jeanne Wells (née Wight) Booth (1922–1995). Jeanne, the former wife of John Welles Booth, was a daughter of George Houghton Wight and Vida (née Johnson) Wight.

Burden died in Charlotte, Vermont on November 14, 1978. He was buried at Grand View Cemetery in Chittenden County, Vermont. After his death, his widow remarried to Dunbar Bostwick in 1983. Bostwick was the widower of Burden's cousin, Electra Webb (a daughter of James Watson Webb, Sr. and Electra Havemeyer Webb).

=== Descendants ===
Through his daughter Katharine, he was a grandfather of the photographer and educator Katharine Sage Sohier (b. 1954).

Through his son Andrew, he was a grandfather of Princeton University graduate William Douglas Burden III (b. 1965), who became a decorated Olympic rower.

== Legacy ==
Burden is commemorated in the scientific name of a species of lizard, Cryptoblepharus burdeni.

== See also ==
- Vanderbilt family
