= James A. Burden III =

American businessman (1897–1979)

- Photograph of Burden, by Arnold Genthe, 1914
- Born: James Abercrombie Burden III; July 10, 1897; Lenox, Massachusetts, US
- Died: May 5, 1979 (aged 81); Locust Valley, New York, US
- Education: Groton School; Harvard University
- Spouse: Elizabeth Leake Walker (m. 1951; died 1979)
- Parent(s): James A. Burden Jr. Florence Adele Sloane
- Relatives: W. Douglas Burden (brother); Arthur Scott Burden (uncle); William D. Sloane (grandfather); Emily Thorn Vanderbilt (grandmother)

James Abercrombie Burden III (July 10, 1897 – May 5, 1979) was an American soldier, businessman and bridge player.

== Early life ==
Photograph of James (left), his father James and younger brother, by Arnold Genthe, 1914

Burden was born on July 10, 1897, in Lenox, Massachusetts, but grew up in Manhattan, where the family lived at 7 East 91st Street in a home designed by Warren & Wetmore. He was the eldest son of James Abercrombie Burden Jr. (1871–1932) and Florence Adele Sloane (1873–1960). His younger brother was William Douglas Burden, and his younger sister was Florence "Sheila" Burden (the wife of Blake Leigh Lawrence, a descendant of the Chanler, Winthrop, and Astor families). After his father's death in 1932, his mother remarried in 1936 to Richard M. Tobin, a banker who had been the American Minister to the Netherlands under President Calvin Coolidge.

His father's family had organized and ran the Burden Iron Works in Troy, of which his father served as president from 1906 until his death. His paternal grandparents were Mary Proudfit (née Irvin) Burden (daughter of Richard Irvin) and James Abercrombie Burden (son of Henry Burden). His uncle, Arthur Scott Burden, was the first husband of Cynthia Roche (the daughter of the 3rd Baron Fermoy and Frances Ellen Work, and a sister of the 4th Baron Fermoy, a grandfather of Diana, Princess of Wales). His niece, Adele Burden Lawrence, married the prominent writer Louis Stanton Auchincloss. His maternal grandparents were William D. Sloane, the head of W. & J. Sloane, and Emily Thorn Vanderbilt (a daughter of William Henry Vanderbilt and granddaughter of Cornelius Vanderbilt). His aunt was Emily Vanderbilt Sloane.

Burden attended Groton School before attending Harvard College where he graduated in 1920.

== Career ==
During World War I, Burden joined the U.S. Navy and in World War II, he was a colonel in the Army Air Corps. He served as chief, Production Resources Section and was awarded the Army-Navy "E" Award "E" pin.

Burden served as president and chairman of the Orange Roller Bearing Company, which manufactured specialized stainless steel products, and was based out of 557 Main Street in Orange, New Jersey. The company a subsidiary of Handy & Harman. Burden retired in 1969 after the assets of its bearings division were sold to Raritan Bearing Corp., a subsidiary of Roller Bearing Co. of America. He also served as a director of the Merritt-Chapman & Scott Corporation of New York.

== Personal life ==
Photograph of Burden, by Arnold Genthe, 1914

On June 25, 1951, Burden was married to Elizabeth Harris (née Leake) Walker (1914–2007) of Richmond, Virginia, in Paris with the civil ceremony in the Mairie of the first Paris district and the religious ceremony at the American Church in Paris. She was the former wife of Bradford Hastings Walker. She was a daughter of Judge David Harris Leake, who served as general attorney of the Chesapeake and Ohio Railway. Through Elizabeth, he became stepfather to twins Bradford Hasting Walker (a stockbroker who married Pamela Drexel, daughter of John R. Drexel III, in 1966) and David Hastings Walker, a yacht broker.

He was a member of the Racquet and Tennis Club of New York, the Piping Rock Club in Locust Valley, and the Meadowbrook Club in Old Westbury, New York. Along with his cousin, Harold S. Vanderbilt, who founded the game, he was an "expert amateur contract-bridge player."

After a long illness, Burden died at his home in Locust Valley, New York, a 1928 French Norman style mansion designed by Benjamin Wistar Morris of LaFarge & Morris, on May 5, 1979.

== See also ==
- Vanderbilt family
