= Vanderbilt Family Cemetery and Mausoleum =

Private burial site in Staten Island, New York

Vanderbilt Family Cemetery
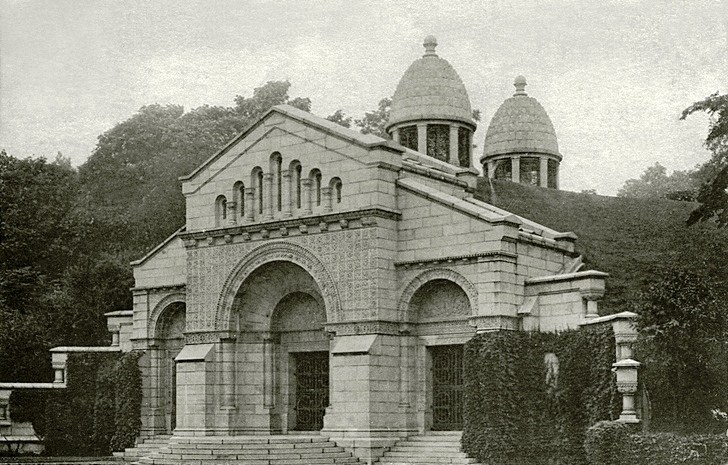
- Vanderbilt family mausoleum before 1923
- Interactive map of Vanderbilt Family Cemetery

Details
- Location: New Dorp, Staten Island, New York
- Country: United States
- Coordinates: 40°34′48″N 74°7′00″W
- Size: 22 acres (8.9 ha)
- Find a Grave: Vanderbilt Family Cemetery
- Vanderbilt Family Cemetery and Mausoleum
- U.S. National Register of Historic Places
- New York City Landmark
- Location: 2205 Richmond Rd., Staten Island, New York
- Built: 1885–1886
- Architect: Richard Morris Hunt
- Architectural style: Romanesque Revival
- NRHP reference No.: 100006780
- NYCL No.: 1208

Significant dates
- Added to NRHP: July 30, 2021
- Designated NYCL: April 12, 2016

The Vanderbilt Family Cemetery and Mausoleum is a private burial site adjacent to the Moravian Cemetery in the New Dorp neighborhood of Staten Island, New York City, United States. It was designed by Richard Morris Hunt and Frederick Law Olmsted in the late 19th century, when the Vanderbilt family was the United States' wealthiest.

== Location ==
The Vanderbilt Family Cemetery and Mausoleum is on the eastern slope of Todt Hill, adjacent to the Moravian Cemetery located at 2205 Richmond Road. The cemetery opened in 1740 and is the largest and oldest active cemetery on Staten Island.

Todt Hill is the highest natural point on the Eastern Seaboard between Cape Cod and Florida, rising to 410 feet (120 m).

== History ==
In 1865, Cornelius Vanderbilt gave the Moravian Church 8.5 acres (3.4 ha). Three years later, he donated an additional 45 acres (18 ha), which is the majority of the Moravian Cemetery and the site of the private Vanderbilt plot. Later, his son William Henry Vanderbilt gave a further 4 acres (1.6 ha) and constructed the residence for the cemetery superintendent. William commissioned the family mausoleum, and was the richest person in America when he died in December 1885.

== Mausoleum ==
The Vanderbilt mausoleum, designed by Richard Morris Hunt and constructed in 1885–1886, is part of the family's private cemetery adjacent to Moravian Cemetery. Hunt's design was inspired by the 12th-century Romanesque Saint-Gilles-du-Gard Abbey near Arles, France. The landscaped grounds around the mausoleum were designed by Frederick Law Olmsted. The Vanderbilt section is not open to the public. Interment within the mausoleum was reserved to those with the Vanderbilt name, including sons, their wives, and unmarried daughters. It houses the remains of all four of William and Maria's sons and three of their wives.

The mausoleum was made a New York City designated landmark in 2016. The New York City Landmarks Preservation Commission's chair said at the time: "The Vanderbilt Mausoleum is an extraordinary monument to America's Gilded Age." In June 2021, the mausoleum was nominated for inclusion on the New York State and National Register of Historic Places. It was added to the NRHP on July 30, 2021.

In addition to the principal Vanderbilt mausoleum, the cemetery contains a secondary structure known as the Sloane Mausoleum, located northwest of the main building. Commissioned in 1897 and completed in 1898, it is attributed to Hunt's son, Richard Howland Hunt. The mausoleum was built for the family of William Douglas Sloane and his wife Emily Thorn Vanderbilt, daughter of William Henry Vanderbilt, and serves as the burial place for members of the Sloane family and their descendants. The structure contains eighteen crypts and reflects the continued use of the cemetery by descendants of the Vanderbilt family through the female line.

== Vanderbilt Cemetery Association ==
The nonprofit Vanderbilt Cemetery Association was created in 2010 by members of the Vanderbilt family to help preserve and protect the property. Alfred Gwynne Vanderbilt III is chairman.

== Notable burials ==
Notable burials in the Vanderbilt family's private section within the cemetery include:

- Cornelius van Derbilt (1764–1832), father of Cornelius.
- Phebe van Derbilt (née Hand) (1767–1854), mother of Cornelius.
- Cornelius Vanderbilt (1794–1877), railroad and shipping tycoon.
- Sophia Johnson Vanderbilt (1795–1868), first wife of Cornelius.
- Frank Armstrong Crawford Vanderbilt (1839–1885), second wife of Cornelius.
- William Henry Vanderbilt (1821–1885), son of Cornelius.
- Maria Louisa Kissam Vanderbilt (1821–1896), wife of William.
- Frances Lavinia Vanderbilt (1829–1868).
- George Washington Vanderbilt (1832–1836).
- George Washington Vanderbilt (1839–1863).
- Cornelius Vanderbilt II (1843–1899), son of William.
- Alice Claypoole Vanderbilt (1845–1934), wife of Cornelius II.
- Margaret Louisa Vanderbilt Shepard (1845–1924), daughter of William.
- Elliott Fitch Shepard (1833–1893), husband of Margaret.
- William Kissam Vanderbilt (1849–1920), son of William.
- Anne Harriman Vanderbilt (1861–1940), second wife of William Kissam.
- Emily Thorn Vanderbilt (1852–1946), daughter of William.
- William Douglas Sloane (1844–1915), first husband of Emily.
- Frederick William Vanderbilt (1856–1938), son of William.
- Louise Vanderbilt (1854–1926), wife of Frederick.
- George Washington Vanderbilt II (1862–1914), son of William.
- William Jay Schieffelin (1866–1955), son-in-law of Margaret.
- Cornelius Vanderbilt III (1873–1942), son of Cornelius II.
- Grace Vanderbilt (1870–1953), wife of Cornelius III.
- Emily Vanderbilt Sloane (1874–1970), daughter of Emily.
- Alice Vanderbilt Morris (1874–1950), daughter of Margaret.
- Dave Hennen Morris (1872–1944), husband of Alice.
- Elliott Shepard (1876–1927), son of Margaret.
- Alfred Gwynne Vanderbilt (1877–1915), son of Cornelius II (cenotaph only, body lost at sea in the sinking of the RMS Lusitania).
- Alessandro Fabbri (1877–1922), brother-in-law of Edith Shepard, daughter of Margaret.
- William Kissam Vanderbilt II (1878–1944), son of William Kissam.
- Reginald Claypoole Vanderbilt (1880–1925), millionaire, equestrian, gambler, son of Cornelius II.
- Gladys Vanderbilt Széchenyi (1886–1965), daughter of Cornelius II.
- Cornelius Vanderbilt IV (1898–1974), son of Cornelius III.
- Bayard Schieffelin (1903–1989), grandson of Margaret.
- John Henry Hammond (1871–1949), lawyer, father of John Hammond (record producer), husband of Emily Vanderbilt Sloane.
- John Hammond (1910–1987), record producer, son of Emily Sloane.
- John P. Hammond (1942–2026), American blues singer and guitarist, son of John Hammond (record producer.)
- Alfred Gwynne Vanderbilt Jr. (1912–1999), society scion and racetrack/racehorse owner, son of Alfred.
- Gloria Vanderbilt (1924–2019), daughter of Reginald, wife of Wyatt Emory Cooper.
- Wyatt Emory Cooper (1927–1978), American author, screenwriter, actor, and fourth husband of Gloria Vanderbilt.
- Carter Vanderbilt Cooper (1965–1988), son of Gloria Vanderbilt and Wyatt Cooper, older brother of Anderson Cooper.

== See also ==
- List of United States cemeteries
- List of New York City Designated Landmarks in Staten Island
- National Register of Historic Places listings in Staten Island
