= Florence Sloane Burden Tobin =

American socialite and philanthropist

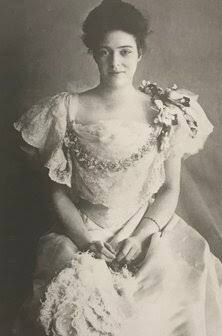
- Born: Florence Adèle Sloane; September 19, 1873; New York City, New York, U.S.
- Died: January 9, 1960 (aged 86); Syosset, New York, U.S.
- Resting place: Oakwood Cemetery
- Occupations: socialite philanthropist
- Spouse(s): James A. Burden Jr. Richard M. Tobin
- Children: 4 (including James A. Burden III and William Douglas Burden)
- Parent(s): William Douglas Sloane; Emily Thorn Vanderbilt
- Relatives: Emily Vanderbilt Sloane (sister)

Florence Adèle Sloane Burden Tobin (September 19, 1873 – January 9, 1960) was an American socialite and philanthropist who was a member of the The Four Hundred during the Gilded Age. She was the president and chairwoman of the Colony Club in New York City, founder of the Committee of Public Kitchens of the New York Society for the Improvement of the Condition for the Poor, and the vice president of the 1918 National Red Cross Drive.

== Early life and family ==
Tobin was born Florence Adèle Sloane in 1873. A relative of the Vanderbilt family, she was the daughter of William Douglas Sloane and Emily Thorn Vanderbilt. She was the granddaughter of William Henry Vanderbilt and a great-granddaughter of Cornelius Vanderbilt.

== Society life and philanthropy ==
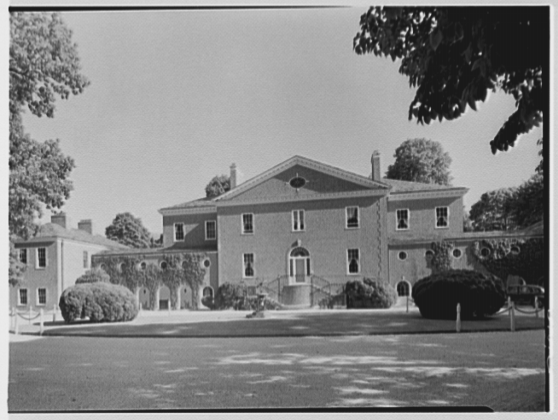
Tobin's estate in Syosset, New York

Tobin was a prominent socialite in New York. She owned a large estate where she hosted Edward, Prince of Wales during his visit to the United States in 1924. She also owned a residence at 1 East 66th Street in New York City.

She served as president and chairwoman of the board of governors for the Colony Club, a women's-only private social club in New York City.

Tobin was involved in multiple charities and, during World War I, she served as vice president of the 1918 National Red Cross Drive. She was the only woman on an advisory council that assisted John D. Rockefeller Jr. while he served as chairman of the Greater New York Committee for the United War Work Campaign. She was the founder of the Committee of Public Kitchens for the New York Society for the Improvement of the Condition for the Poor.

== Personal life ==
She was first married to James A. Burden Jr., president of Burden Iron Works. They were wed at Trinity Episcopal Church in Lenox, Massachusetts. They had four children, including James A. Burden III and William Douglas Burden. Her husband died in 1932.

She married a second time to the banker and diplomat Richard M. Tobin in 1936.

Tobin died in 1960 at Woodside Acres, her estate on Muttontown Road in Syosset, New York. She was buried at Oakwood Cemetery in Troy, New York.
