= James Burden =

James Burden may refer to:

- James A. Burden Jr. (1871–1932), American industrialist from New York
- James A. Burden III (1897–1979), his son, American soldier, businessman and bridge player

== See also ==
- James A. Burden House, a mansion in Manhattan in, New York City
