= Sloane Hospital for Women =

- NewYork-Presbyterian Hospital since 1925
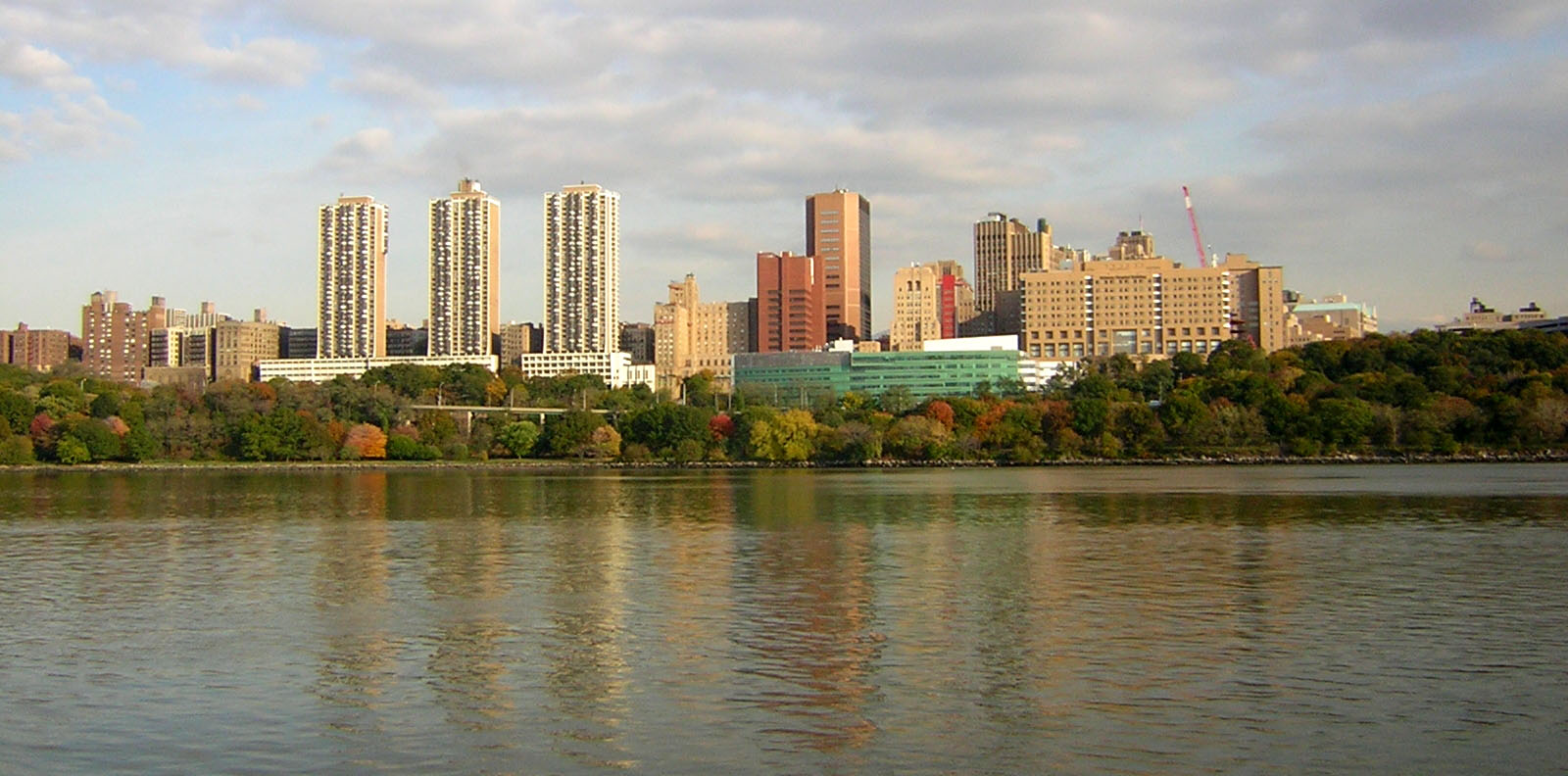
- NewYork–Presbyterian Hospital, Columbia campus

Geography
- Location: Manhattan, New York, United States
- Coordinates: 40.84086°N 73.94175°W

Organization
- Affiliated university: Columbia University Vagelos College of Physicians and Surgeons, Columbia University Irving Medical Center

History
- Former name: Sloane Maternity Hospital
- Opened: 1886

Links
- Lists: Hospitals in New York State
- Other links: Hospitals in Manhattan

The Sloane Hospital for Women is the obstetrics and gynecology service within NewYork-Presbyterian Hospital and the Department of Obstetrics and Gynecology of the Columbia University College of Physicians and Surgeons (P&S) in New York City. It was founded in 1886 with Columbia P&S as a training and treatment center for obstetrics. It has provided over 100 years of obstetrical care. The hospital is located within Morgan Stanley Children's Hospital.

== History ==
Sloane Maternity Hospital was founded in 1886 with a donation from William D. Sloane and his wife, Emily Thorn Vanderbilt, the granddaughter of Cornelius Vanderbilt, to Columbia P&S. On January 18, 1886, Dr. James W. McLane approached the College of Physicians and Surgeons Board of Trustees with the issue of a lack of obstetrical training and care in New York. He presented to the board an offer from William D. Sloane and Emily Sloane to fund the building of a maternity hospital in conjunction with the Columbia P&S. The board accepted the offer and the construction of Sloane Maternity Hospital was complete by the end of 1886. The hospital was located on the P&S campus in Midtown Manhattan at Amsterdam Avenue and 59th Street, serving as a teaching facility for P&S students, and opened its doors in early 1888.

The founding board of trustees for the hospital consisted of "Dr. McLane as the President, Mr. Sloane as the treasurer, and Dr. Delafield as Secretary." One of the first actions of the board was to establish Sloane Maternity Hospital as a training center in obstetrics for nurses. Miss Harriet E. Dutcher was appointed as the "Principal of the Sloane Training School." Obstetric staff at the hospital was made up of Dr. Thomas, Dr. McLane, and Dr. Edward Partridge.

The hospital soon established a reputation for superior sanitary practices and low mortality rates. It was originally created on the basis of free obstetrical care for underprivileged, but due to increasing fees the endowment of the Sloane Family could not cover all the costs. In 1897, an alternate policy was created that required patients to pay medical costs and extra fees for special accommodations, such as a private room. If the applicant for admission could not afford the care, they were admitted for free.

Edwin Cragin, the second director of the hospital, began linking the training and treatment of obstetrics with gynecology. In 1910, the facility changed its name to Sloane Hospital for Women. In 1911, a new surgical building was added, also funded by the Sloanes.

In 1925, Sloane became part of Presbyterian Hospital, which was operating in affiliation with P&S. In 1928, it moved with P&S and Presbyterian Hospital to its present location on 168th Street in the Washington Heights area of northern Manhattan to form Columbia-Presbyterian Medical Center. There it maintained its name while occupying several floors of the Presbyterian Hospital building. Sloane is now part of NewYork-Presbyterian pediatrics within the Morgan Stanley Children's Hospital, and the name is still in use today.

=== Notable births ===
Notable people born at Sloane include actor Humphrey Bogart, National Geographic photographer Gordon Gahan, and former First Lady of the United States Nancy Reagan.

== Early obstetrical care ==
The Sloane Maternity Hospital was created to focus on obstetrical care and referred all gynecological patients to the Vanderbilt Clinic. Dr. McLane recorded the early obstetrical care at Sloane Maternity Hospital in his report "Report on the First Series of One Thousand Successive Confinements from January 1st, 1888 to October 1st, 1890 at Sloane Maternity Hospital." The hospital implemented the use of carbolic acid to clean the lying-in wards and banned the use of straw beds to create sanitary conditions for patients. Delivery consisted of rectal anema and vaginal douche before the birth, delivery of the baby while the mother was on her side, and another vaginal douche after the placenta was delivered. After birth, maternal care consisted of vaginal sutures with silk worm gut, a transfusion of ergot to prevent bleeding, and bed rest for 9 days after delivery. Of the first 1000 deliveries performed at the hospital, only six resulted in maternal death, two of which were attributed to placenta praevia. The procedures performed in the first 1000 cases were 12 inductions of labor, 83 deliveries with forceps, 14 cases of version, 3 cases of craniotomy, and 14 treatments of postpartum hemorrhage.

Case histories of early obstetrical care at Sloane Maternity Hospital include a patient delivering a child with encapholitis, a patient pregnant with twins presenting prolapsed funis and eclamptic seizures, a patient with version, and a patient with a contracted pelvis. The detailed case histories of these patients discussed tools and techniques used at the hospital including: cephalotripsy, the use of chloroform as an anesthetic, the use of opium for pain treatment, the use of a Barnes' dilator, the Crede's maneuver, and bougie labor induction.

== Early instruction ==
After its founding, and in coordination with Columbia University Vagelos College of Physicians and Surgeons, Sloane Maternity Hospital became an obstetrical student training center. In 1890, the clinical training of P & S students started out with a few students. The program gradually increased in size, with 225 students attending in 1895. The instruction consisted of lectures by Dr. McLane, Dr. Partridge, and Dr. Tuttle as well as patient observation, patient examination, and performing deliveries. Topics covered in the lectures included causes of abortion, "albuminuria of pregnancy," abnormalities of labor, obstructed labor, and breech labor. In 1894, the College of Physicians and Surgeons announced that they would be holding summer courses at Sloane Maternity Hospital for physicians and medical students. For a fee of $50, the student would be provided a dormitory, forty lessons on obstetrical operations, observation of births at the hospital, and teachings on how to treat new born infants.

== Important work and practitioners ==
Theodore Gaillard Thomas worked at the women's hospital and was a pioneer surgeon that focused on women's reproduction issues. Thomas's surgical work at this hospital led to the development of obstetric surgical instruments and new gynecological operations, such extraperitoneal cesarean section and the removal of ovarian tumors “per viginam.” James W. McLane also developed an important obstetric instrument, Tucker-McLane forceps. The first time the Tucker- McLane forceps were used was at the Sloane Maternity Hospital in 1891 and they continued to be in Sloane Maternity Hospital practice for 30 years.

As a research and clinical facility, the Sloane Hospital for Women pioneered advances in the field, including the Apgar score, the use of rhogam, and amniocentesis. The hospital trained generations of obstetrical and gynecological medical students, nurses, graduate physicians. With the research of the medical practitioners, the hospital was able to increase medical knowledge regarding woman's reproduction.

== Modern times ==
Today, Sloane Hospital for Women remains affiliated with NYP-CUMC and is known for its work in obstetrics and gynecology. This hospital consists of multiple departments, including The Carmen and John Thain Labor and Delivery Unit, the Carmen and John Thain Center for Prenatal Pediatrics, and The Mothers Center. In 2015, the hospital delivered over 4,000 babies in the Labor and Delivery Unit. The work of the hospital includes delivery, pediatric and adolescent gynecological care, gynecological cancer treatment, and treatment of reproductive disorders. The hospital is developing a program of personalized medicine to address women's mental health and well-being.
