= Cryptoblepharus burdeni =

Conservation status
- Least Concern (IUCN 3.1)

Scientific classification
- Kingdom: Animalia
- Phylum: Chordata
- Class: Reptilia
- Order: Squamata
- Family: Scincidae
- Genus: Cryptoblepharus
- Species: C. burdeni

Binomial name
- Cryptoblepharus burdeni Dunn, 1927

Synonyms
- Cryptoblepharus boutonii burdeni Dunn, 1927; Ablepharus boutonii burdeni — Mertens, 1931; Cryptoblepharus burdeni — Greer, 1974

Species of lizard

Cryptoblepharus burdeni is a species of lizard in the family Scincidae. The species is endemic to Indonesia.

== Etymology ==
The specific name, burdeni, is in honor of American naturalist William Douglas Burden.

== Geographic range ==
Within Indonesia, C. burdeni is found on the islands of Flores, Komodo, and Padar.
