= William Douglas Sloane =

American businessman, sportsman and philanthropist

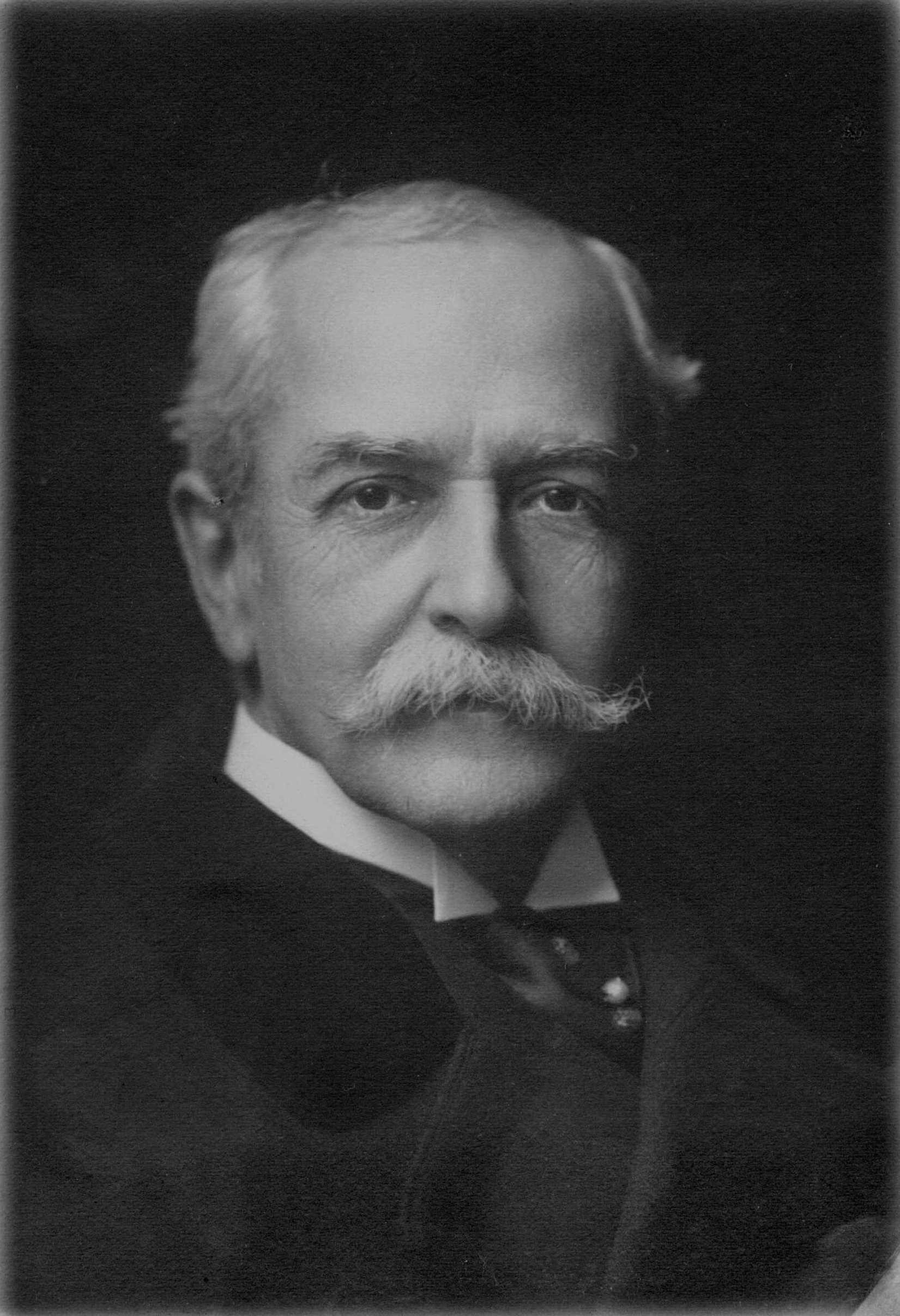
- Born: February 29, 1844; New York City, New York, U.S.
- Died: March 19, 1915 (aged 71); Aiken, South Carolina, U.S.
- Employer: W. & J. Sloane
- Spouse: Emily Thorn Vanderbilt (m. 1872)
- Children: 5, including Emily and Florence
- Parent(s): William Sloane; Euphemia Douglas
- Relatives: Henry T. Sloane (brother); Henry Sloane Coffin (nephew); William Sloane Coffin Sr. (nephew)

William Douglas Sloane (February 29, 1844 – March 19, 1915) was an American businessman, sportsman, philanthropist, and member of New York society during the Gilded Age.

== Early life ==
Sloane was born in New York City on February 29, 1844. He was the third son of William Sloane (1810–1879) and Euphemia (née Douglas) Sloane (1810–1886). Among his siblings was John Sloane, who married Adela Berry; Douglas Sloane; Mary Elizabeth Sloane; Henry Thompson Sloane, who married Jessie Ann Robbins (who later divorced him so she could marry Perry Belmont); and Euphemia (née Sloane) Coffin, who married Edmund Coffin and was the mother of Rev. Henry Sloane Coffin and William Sloane Coffin Sr.

His parents were emigrants from Kilmarnock, Scotland. His paternal grandparents were John Sloane and Jane Mary (née Lammie) Sloane, and his maternal grandparents were David and Margaret Douglas.

== Career ==
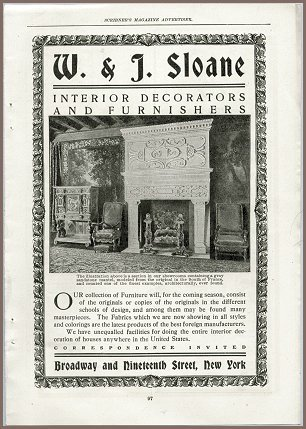
Advertisement for W. & J. Sloane Furniture from Sept. 1902 editions of Scribner's Magazine.

Beginning at the age of fifteen, Sloane started working for the family carpet and furniture firm which was started by his father in 1843. In 1852, his uncle John W. Sloane joined the firm and it was renamed W. & J. Sloane.

In 1866, he became a member of the firm, and when the company was incorporated in 1891, Sloane became a director and remained on the board until his death. He served as treasurer of the company.

During the U.S. Civil War, Sloane enlisted as a private in Company H of the Seventh Regiment on October 31, 1862. The Regiment was ordered to Washington in 1863. He was made corporal in 1866, sergeant in 1868 and was honorably discharged on May 19, 1871.

=== Philanthropy ===
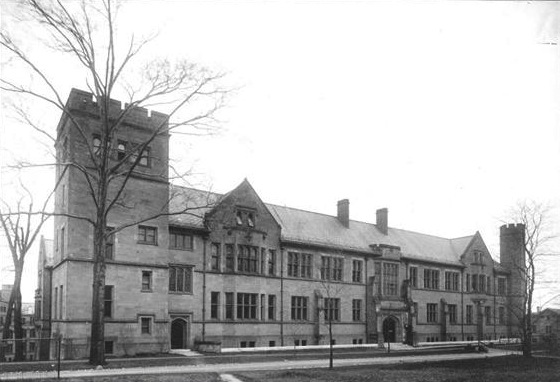
Sloane Physics Laboratory, the science building funded by Sloane at Yale University.

In 1888, Sloane and his wife financed the creation of New York's Sloane Hospital for Women in 1888 with an endowment of more than $1,000,000. The Sloane Hospital is currently an obstetrics and gynecology service within New York-Presbyterian Hospital and the Department of Obstetrics and Gynecology of the Columbia University College of Physicians and Surgeons in New York City. He also donated heavily to the Children's Aid Society.

In 1889, Yale honored Sloane with the honorary degree of M.A. In 1912, Sloane and his brother Henry jointly donated in excess of $500,000 to create the Yale Physics Laboratory at Yale University, as a memorial to their father.

Sloane was a member of the board of trustees of Columbia University, a fellow of the New-York Historical Society, and a director of almost twelve companies, including the Suburban Homes Company, the United States Trust Company, the Central and South American Telegraph Company, the Eastern Steel Company, the Guaranty Safe Deposit Company, the Guaranty Trust Company, the Mahoning Railroad Company, and the National City Bank of New York.

=== Society life ===
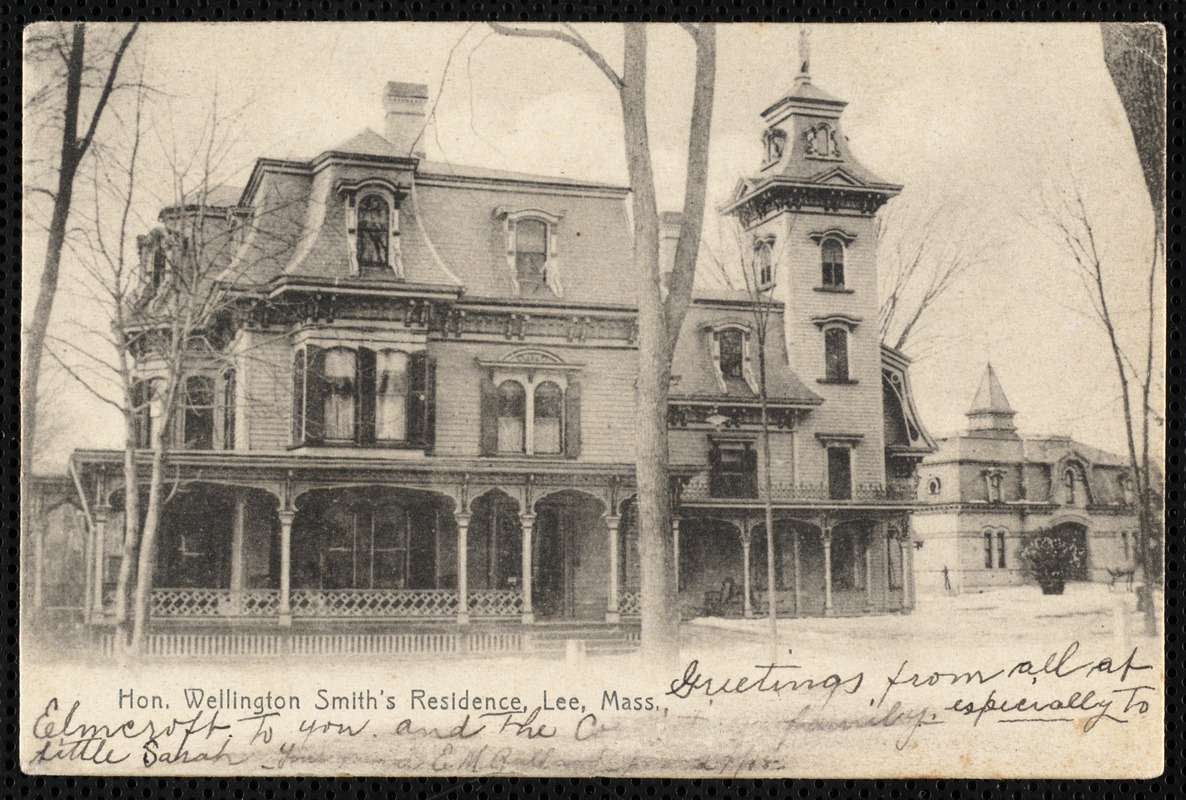
Equestrian estate in Lee, Massachusetts, acquired from Wellington Smith, father of Elizur Yale Smith.

In 1892, Sloane along with his wife and several members of their extended families, were included in Ward McAllister's "Four Hundred", purported to be an index of New York's best families, published in The New York Times. Conveniently, 400 was the number of people that could fit into Mrs. Astor's ballroom.

He was a member of the Union Club of the City of New York, the Metropolitan Club, the Ardsley Club, the Union League Club, the Racquet and Tennis Club, the Automobile of America Club, the Riding Club, the New York Yacht Club, the Sleepy Hollow Club, the Country Club and the Aero Club.

Sloane also had an equestrian estate acquired from Wellington Smith, a wealthy paper manufacturer, member of the Yale family, and a country estate in Mount Kisco, New York which is now called Merestead Park.

== Personal life ==
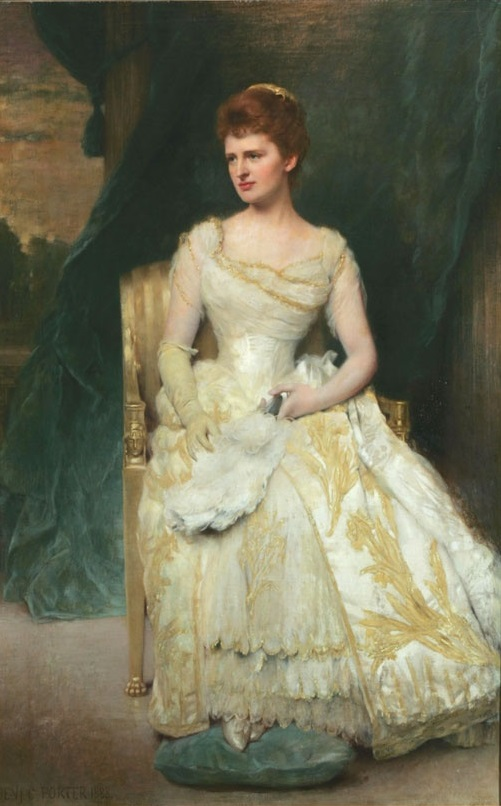
Portrait of Sloane's wife, Emily Thorn Vanderbilt, by Benjamin Curtis Porter.

In 1872, Sloane was married to Emily Thorn Vanderbilt (1852–1946), the fifth child, and second daughter, of William Henry Vanderbilt.

Her siblings included William, Cornelius, Margaret, Florence, Frederick, Eliza, and George Washington Vanderbilt II, all grandchildren of Commodore Cornelius Vanderbilt. They were the builders of Vanderbilt House, The Breakers, Woodlea, Florham, Hyde Park, and Biltmore.

The couple were the parents of three daughters and two sons:

- Florence Adele Sloane (1873–1960), wife of James Abercrombie Burden Jr. and of Richard Montgomery Tobin.
- Emily Vanderbilt Sloane (1874–1970), who married lawyer John Henry Hammond III.
- Lila Vanderbilt Sloane (1878–1934), wife of William Bradhurst Osgood Field.
- William Douglas Sloane Jr., who died in 1884 as an infant.
- Malcolm Douglas Vanderbilt Sloane (1885–1924), who married Elinor Lee in 1915.

In New York, the Sloane's lived at 2 West 52nd Street in Manhattan. In 1885, William and Emily commissioned Peabody and Stearns to build Elm Court, the enormous shingle-style "cottage" in Lenox, Massachusetts.

Sloane died of a kidney ailment on March 19, 1915, in Aiken, South Carolina, of which he had been suffering from for a while. Following a funeral at St. Bartholomew's Church, he was buried in the Sloane Mausoleum in Moravian Cemetery at New Dorp, Staten Island. After his death, his widow remarried in 1920 to Henry White, the former U.S. Ambassador to France and Italy, and a signatory of the Treaty of Versailles. Emily died, aged 94, in Lenox, Massachusetts, on July 29, 1946.

=== Descendants ===
His grandchildren include Adele Hammond, paternal grandmother of actor Timothy Olyphant; Alice Frances Hammond, wife of jazz musician Benny Goodman; Rachel Hammond, cattle breeder and wife of Manley D. Breck; and John Henry Hammond, talent scout.
