= John Henry Hammond =

American record producer, civil rights activist and music critic (1910–1987)

John Hammond
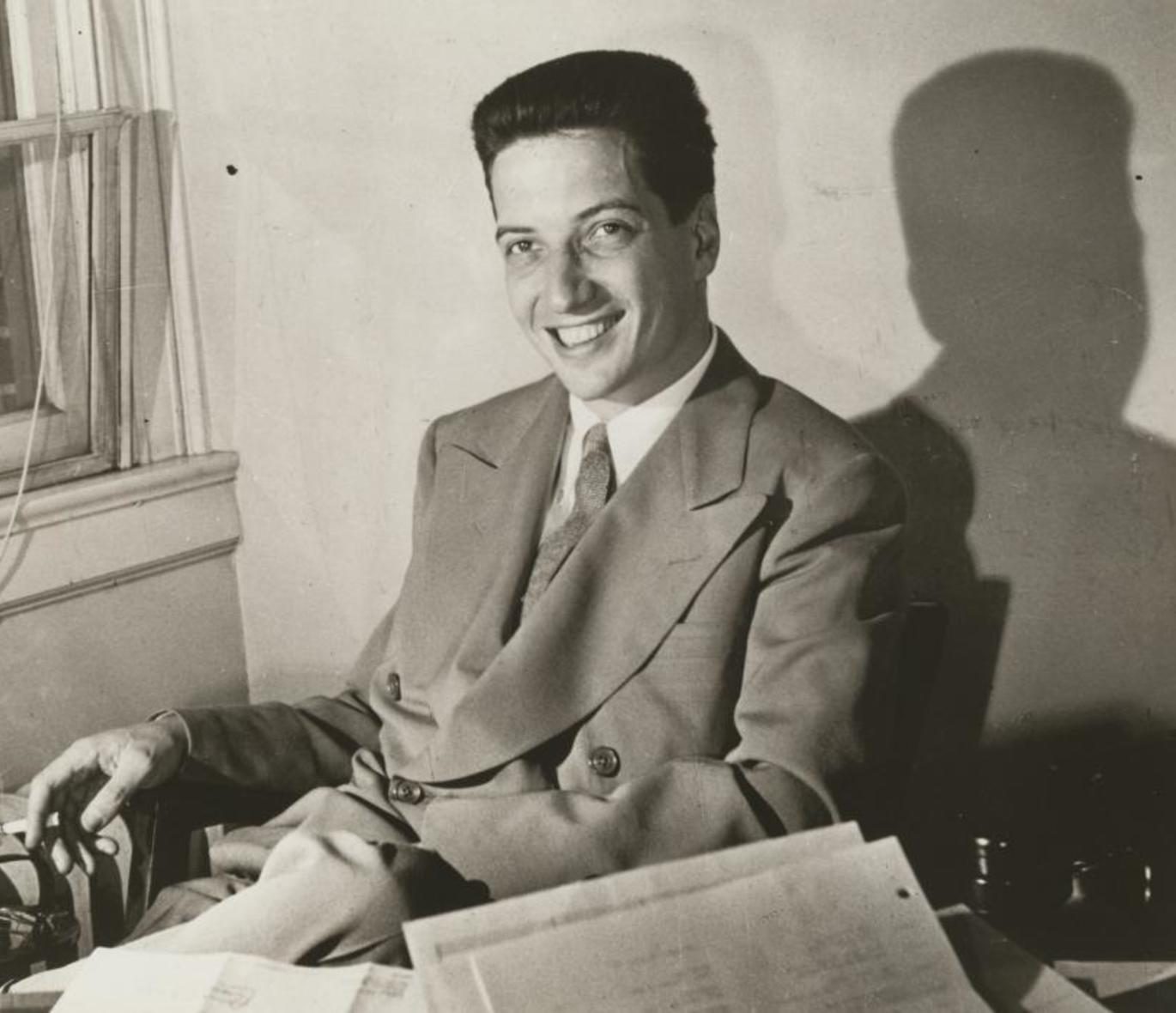
- Hammond in 1940
- Born: John Henry Hammond Jr. December 15, 1910; New York City, U.S.
- Died: July 10, 1987 (aged 76)
- Burial place: Vanderbilt Family Cemetery and Mausoleum, Staten Island, New York, U.S.
- Education: Yale University
- Occupation: Music producer
- Known for: Columbia Records
- Spouses: Jemison "Jemy" McBride (m. 1941–1948); Esme O'Brien Sarnoff (m. 1949; died 1986)
- Children: 2, including John P. Hammond
- Parent: Emily Vanderbilt Sloane
- Relatives: William Henry Vanderbilt (great grandfather); Ogden H. Hammond (uncle); Millicent Fenwick (cousin)
- Awards: Member of the Rock and Roll Hall of Fame

John Henry Hammond Jr. (December 15, 1910 – July 10, 1987) was an American record producer, civil rights activist, and music critic active from the 1930s to the early 1980s. As a talent scout, Hammond became one of the most influential figures in 20th-century popular music. He is the father of blues musician John P. Hammond.

Hammond sparked or advanced numerous musical careers, including those of Bob Dylan, Bruce Springsteen, Benny Goodman, Harry James, Charlie Christian, Billie Holiday, Count Basie, Teddy Wilson, Big Joe Turner, Fletcher Henderson, Pete Seeger, Babatunde Olatunji, Aretha Franklin, George Benson, Freddie Green, Leonard Cohen, Arthur Russell, Jim Copp, Asha Puthli, Stevie Ray Vaughan, Mike Bloomfield and Sonny Burke. He is also largely responsible for the revival of delta blues artist Robert Johnson's music.

== Early years and family ==
Hammond was born in New York, christened John Henry Hammond Jr., although both his father and paternal grandfather shared the name. He was the youngest child and only son of John Henry Hammond and Emily Vanderbilt Sloane. His mother was one of three daughters of William Douglas Sloane and Emily Thorn Vanderbilt, and a granddaughter of William Henry Vanderbilt. The family lived at the John Henry Hammond House in Manhattan.

His father attended Yale University, and graduated with a law degree from Columbia Law School. His grandfather was Civil War General John Henry Hammond, who married Sophia Vernon Wolfe. His father was a brother of Ogden H. Hammond, ambassador to Spain, and uncle to politician Millicent Fenwick. Despite the family fortune from his mother's side of the family, which included wealth from the W. & J. Sloane chain, his father worked to provide for his family and maintain the family fortune. He worked "as a banker, lawyer, and railroad executive".

Hammond had four sisters: Emily, Adele, Rachel, and Alice. The youngest, Alice, married Arthur Duckworth in 1927, and then, after divorcing him, the musician Benny Goodman in 1942. Well-known clergyman and peace activist William Sloane Coffin Jr. was a cousin.

Hammond showed interest in music from an early age. At four he began studying the piano, then switched to the violin at age eight. He was steered toward classical music by his mother but was more interested in the music sung and played by the servants, many of whom were black. He was known to go down to his basement to listen to the upbeat music in the servants' quarters. He loved Sir Harry Lauder's "Roamin' in the Gloamin'". While he was in the basement, the rest of his family in the greater part of the five-story mansion would listen to "the great opera tenor Enrico Caruso, as well as to standard classics by Beethoven, Brahms, and Mozart".

Hammond became interested in social reform at a young age. His mother also promoted social reform as a means to give back some of her fortune to the community. She often found solace in religion. Hammond shared her desire to help the community with his privilege.

Hammond said he first heard jazz music in London during a 1923 trip with his family. He heard The Georgians, a white Dixieland jazz group; and saw an African American show, From Dixie to Broadway, that featured Sidney Bechet. The trip changed how he thought about music. Upon his return to the States, Hammond searched for records by black musicians but could not find them in his neighborhood. He learned that African American music was sold in different stores, so he began to look for this music in Harlem.

In 1925, 14-year-old Hammond graduated from the elementary St. Bernard's School, then persuaded his family to send him to Hotchkiss School due to its liberal curriculum. Hammond's love for music flourished. However, he felt limited by boarding school. Hammond convinced the headmaster to allow him to go into New York City every other weekend, a rare privilege, so that he could take lessons from Ronald Murat. However, the headmaster was not aware that outside his formal lessons, Hammond would go up to Harlem to hear jazz. During this time, he said, he heard Bessie Smith perform at The Harlem Alhambra, but her biographer disagrees about the dates.

After graduating from Hotchkiss in 1929, Hammond took a summer job at the Portland Evening News newspaper in Maine. Its editor Ernest Gruening, Hotchkiss class of 1903, was also interested in social issues and social justice.

In the fall of 1929, Hammond entered Yale University as a member of the class of 1933. He studied the violin and, later, viola. He felt a disconnect with his fellow students and felt that he was already well acquainted with the professional world. He made frequent trips into New York City and wrote regularly for trade magazines. In the fall of 1930, Hammond had to withdraw due to a recurring case of jaundice. Hammond had no desire to a repeat a semester, which contributed to his dissatisfaction with the university lifestyle. Much to the disappointment of his father, a Yale alumnus, in 1931 he dropped out of school for a career in the music industry, first becoming the U.S. correspondent for Melody Maker.

== Career ==
In 1931, Hammond funded the recording of pianist Garland Wilson, marking the beginning of a long string of artistic successes as record producer. He moved to Greenwich Village, where he claimed to have engaged in bohemian life and worked for an integrated music world. He set up one of the first regular live jazz programs, and wrote regularly about the racial divide. As he wrote in his memoirs, "I heard no color line in the music. ... To bring recognition to the Negro's supremacy in jazz was the most effective and constructive form of social protest I could think of." In 1941, he helped found the Council on African Affairs.

In 1932, Hammond acquired a nonpaying job on the WEVD radio station as a disc jockey. He did not discriminate when choosing which musicians to air; the station allowed Hammond complete freedom on the station as long as he paid for his time slot. Through this position, Hammond gained a reputation as a well-educated jazz fan. Various musicians were guests on his show, including Fletcher Henderson, Benny Carter, and Art Tatum. When the station transferred from the Broadway Central Hotel to the Claridge Hotel, the new venue would not allow the black musicians to use the main elevator. For this reason, Hammond quit his work with WEVD.

By 1932–33, through his involvement in the UK music paper Melody Maker, Hammond arranged for the faltering US Columbia label to provide recordings for the Okeh Columbia label, mostly using the specially created Columbia W-265000 matrix series. Hammond recorded Fletcher Henderson, Benny Carter, Joe Venuti, Benny Goodman, and other jazz performers during the Great Depression, when few would otherwise had the opportunity to enter a studio and play jazz. (A handful of these recordings were issued in the US.)

In 1934, Hammond introduced Benny Goodman and Fletcher Henderson. It is said that Hammond convinced the musicians to "swing" the current jazz hits, so that they could play in a free manner like the original New Orleans Jazz.

Hammond always strived for racial integration within the musical scene. For this purpose, he frequently visited musicians in Harlem in order to connect with musicians in their own area. While initially his race proved a problem in connecting with this community, he formed relationships with various musicians that allowed him to surpass this barrier. His friendship with Benny Carter gave him a status that allowed him to enter this musical community.

He played a role in organizing Benny Goodman's band, and in persuading him to hire black musicians such as Charlie Christian, Teddy Wilson and Lionel Hampton. In 1933 he heard the seventeen-year-old Billie Holiday perform in Harlem and arranged for her recording debut, on a Benny Goodman session. Four years later, he heard the Count Basie orchestra broadcasting from Kansas City and brought it to New York, where it began to receive national attention.

In 1938, Hammond organized the first From Spirituals to Swing concert at Carnegie Hall, presenting a broad program of blues, jazz and gospel artists, including Ida Cox, Big Joe Turner, Albert Ammons, Pete Johnson, Meade "Lux" Lewis, Sister Rosetta Tharpe, the Count Basie orchestra, Sidney Bechet, Sonny Terry, James P. Johnson, and Big Bill Broonzy (who took the place of the deceased Robert Johnson). He coordinated a second From Spirituals to Swing concert in 1939.

After serving in the military during World War II, Hammond felt unmoved by the bebop jazz scene of the mid-1940s. Rejoining Columbia Records in the late 1950s, he signed Pete Seeger and Babatunde Olatunji to the label, and discovered Aretha Franklin, then an eighteen-year-old gospel singer. In 1961, he heard folk singer Bob Dylan playing harmonica on a session for Carolyn Hester; he signed him to Columbia and kept him on the label despite the protests of executives, who referred to Dylan as "Hammond's folly". He produced Dylan's early recordings, "Blowin' in the Wind" and "A Hard Rain's a-Gonna Fall".

" What I wanted to do with Bobby was just to get him to sound in the studio as natural, just as he was in person, and have that extraordinary personality come thru. ... After all, he's not a great harmonica player, and he's not a great guitar player, and he's not a great singer. He just happens to be an original. And I just wanted to have that originality come through."

— John Hammond on Bob Dylan, 1968 Pop Chronicles interview.

Hammond oversaw the highly influential posthumous reissues of Robert Johnson's recorded work (produced by Don Law, convincing Columbia Records to issue the album King of the Delta Blues Singers in 1961. Musicians Hammond signed to the label included Leonard Cohen and Bruce Springsteen.

Hammond retired from Columbia in 1975 but continued to scout for talent. In 1983, he brought guitarist Stevie Ray Vaughan to Columbia and was credited as executive producer on his debut album.

== Personal accounts ==
Hammond recognized jazz music to have originated as an African-American musical genre. When Hammond entered the jazz community, integration had not yet begun. Black and white musicians rarely played together and often the prestigious locations permitted only white audiences. Hammond remembers that before the 1920s, black musicians could always find jobs, even if they were low paying. After the instatement of Local 802, a union of professional musicians within New York City, Hammond saw more white people receiving jobs than black people. However, this did not stop the African-American musicians. Through burlesque and record making, these musicians continued to be a presence.

1933 was a defining year for Hammond. He remembers this year being extraordinary due to his establishment of relationships with British record companies. Hammond was able to secure contracts for various musicians. He was an attractive producer to these companies because he did not desire a profit for himself. In 1933, he helped Benny Goodman receive a record deal with Columbia Records, which at the time was only known as English Columbia. During this time, Goodman was in need of a big break, as he was getting a reputation as being difficult to work with. Hammond proposed that Goodman produce a multiracial record; however, Goodman believed this route would hurt his musical reputation.

In this year, Hammond broke out of the traditional role of a producer and became a talent scout, after hearing Billie Holiday. He remarks that he was astounded to discover that she was the daughter of Clarence Holiday from Fletcher Henderson's band. That same year, he was able to get her involved in the Benny Goodman Orchestra. Hammond attributes fate to his finding of Holiday. After hearing her sing for the first time, he wrote, "She weighs over 200 pounds, is incredibly beautiful, and sings as well as anybody I have ever heard."

Later in 1933, he heard Teddy Wilson, a jazz pianist, on a Chicago radio broadcast. Hammond provided opportunities for him, including some collaboration with Billie Holiday.

Hammond's work with civil rights took various forms. In 1933, he traveled south to a trial concerning the Scottsboro case, in which two white girls accused nine black boys of raping them. The testimonies of the two girls did not align. While all nine boys were convicted, Hammond viewed this trial as a "catalyst for black activism".

Record integration became an important component of jazz music. Starting in 1935, musicians began to record in mixed-race groups. While some of this integration had already taken place, Hammond remembers it as being hidden. In 1935, the Goodman Trio began recording. In 1936, the group appeared in a live concert at the Chicago Hot Jazz Society. Hammond fondly remembers this as an innovative moment in jazz history.

== FBI investigation ==
FBI Director J. Edgar Hoover investigated Hammond's links to the Communist Party, of which Hammond was never a member. His name often appeared in The Daily Worker, a communist newspaper, because of the various benefits and fund-raisers that Hammond hosted for the popular front. It also appeared on the letterheads of left-wing organizations for which he was a donor or member.

== Personal life ==
Hammond had four sisters: Alice, Rachel, Adele, and Emily.

Early in his career, Hammond focused more on his work than his love life. While he was seen publicly with various women, the relationships were never substantial. In 1940, Hammond met Jemison "Jemy" McBride at a Manhattan party. They were married on March 8, 1941, in New Haven, Connecticut. The couple had a small, non-denominational wedding with only about ten guests. Although both sets of parents approved of the couple, neither attended the wedding.

In 1942, Hammond took his wife on a road trip to Los Angeles. Shortly after this trip, Jemy realized that she was pregnant. In November 1942, Jemy gave birth to their first son, John P. Hammond.

On March 21, 1942, Hammond's sister, Alice married Benny Goodman. She had previously been married to Englishman Arthur Duckworth, a member of the British House of Commons. Hammond did not look kindly upon her marriage to Goodman. After years of arguments and disagreements about the musical directions of Goodman's band, Hammond and Goodman fell out. This has been attributed to their differing class and educational backgrounds; Goodman had been born into poverty and had quit high school to help support his family as a musician. Hammond could be dogmatic and controlling in his interactions with musicians, as well as in his published writings on jazz and on specific performers. Goodman eventually grew weary of Hammond's contentious nature. The two would reconcile after Alice's death in 1978.

In November 1943, after the United States entered World War II, Hammond began military training. He underwent basic training at Fort Belvoir, Virginia. Much older than most of the other men, he had a rough time adjusting to the military life. While he was in basic training early in 1944, Jemy gave birth to their second child, Douglas. When newborn Douglas became ill, Jemy sent a telegram to alert Hammond, who never received it. Jemy speculated that Hammond was in a concert and disregarded the letter, but Hammond's strict training schedule made that unlikely. Douglas died shortly after birth, a tragedy Jemy bore alone. Hammond returned after basic training on a three-day pass, but he and his wife were distant.

After basic training, Hammond reported to Camp Plauche, where he was ordered to organize activities for the black soldiers, who were given few military tasks. The armed forces were still segregated and discriminatory. Hammond began by organizing concerts for the soldiers, featuring African-American musicians. Shortly after these concerts began, an integrated sports team formed. Toward the end of the war, Hammond was transferred to Fort Benning, Georgia, known for its intense racism. Hammond was not the only jazz fan irritated with racism. During this time, bebop music grew out of late-night jam sessions of black musicians. Hammond was not much a part of the bebop movement, but he shared the sentiment against racism.

In 1946, Hammond was discharged from the military. His family moved to Greenwich Village, where Jemy gave birth to their third son, Jason. Hammond threw himself back into his work, which upset his wife. In 1948, Jemy asked Hammond for a divorce. Originally reluctant, Hammond eventually agreed. Jemy never remarried.

A year later, in 1949, Hammond met Esme Sarnoff, originally Esme O'Brien, the former wife of NBC chairman Robert Sarnoff, and a daughter of Mary and Esmond O'Brien. Esme shared Hammond's musical passion and was planning to divorce her husband. That year, Hammond married Esme Sarnoff. By this marriage Hammond had one stepdaughter, (Esme) Rosita Sarnoff (born 1943). During this time, Hammond's father died on a golf course. Left a widow, Emily Hammond became infatuated with Frank Buchman.

In 1985, Hammond had his first stroke. Although this impaired him physically, his wife's death left him in despair. Esme Hammond was diagnosed with breast cancer. While treatments worked for some time, she died May 19, 1986, of complications of AIDS, which she had contracted from a blood transfusion. Hammond was distraught and died on July 10, 1987, after a series of strokes. It is said that he died listening to the music of Billie Holiday.

== Legacy ==
"John's Idea", originally titled "I May Be Wrong It's John's Idea", is a tribute to John Hammond written by Count Basie.

Hammond received a Grammy Trustees Award for being credited with co-producing a Bessie Smith reissue in 1971, and in 1986 was the inaugural recipient of the Rock and Roll Hall of Fame Lifetime Achievement Award.

Hammond's son, John P. Hammond, became an American blues musician.

Hammond was one of the first men to racially integrate the American music industry. Before the Civil Rights Act passed, Tom Wilson, an African American, replaced Hammond as Bob Dylan's record producer.

In December 2015 Guinness featured Hammond in its UK advertising campaign.

Prince's song "Avalanche" mentions Hammond in the lyric "Mr. John Hammond with his pen in hand... Sayin' 'Sign your kingdom over to me and be known throughout the land!'"

== Bibliography ==
- Berger, Edward. "Hammond, John (Henry Jr.)". The New Grove Dictionary of Jazz. Web.
- Dunstan Prial (2006) The Producer: John Hammond and the Soul of American Music, Farrar, Straus and Giroux, ISBN 0-374-11304-1
- John Hammond, "An Experience in Jazz History", in Dominique-René de Lerma, ed., Black Music in Our Culture: Curricular Ideas on the Subjects, Materials, and Problems (Kent State University Press, 1970), pp. 42–53.
- John Hammond with Irving Townsend (1977) John Hammond On Record: An Autobiography, Ridge Press – Summit Books, ISBN 0-671-40003-7
- "Swing". The Subject Is Jazz. WNBC. New York, New York, 1958. Television.
