= Benjamin Curtis Porter =

American painter

- Born: August 27, 1843; Melrose, Massachusetts, U.S.
- Died: April 2, 1908 (aged 64); New York City, New York, U.S.
- Spouse: Mary Louise Clark (after 1887)
- Parent(s): Charles Porter; Julia Curtis Porter

Benjamin Curtis Porter (August 27, 1843 – April 2, 1908) was an American artist.

== Early life ==
Porter was born at Melrose, Massachusetts on August 27, 1843. He was the son of Charles Porter and Julia (née Curtis) Porter. Porter came from an "old Massachusetts family whose scions have been good citizens, soldiers, divines and lawyers in America."

He was a pupil of Dr. Rimmer and Albion Harris Bicknell in Boston and of the Paris schools after traveling extensively in America and Europe.

== Career ==
Porter, who began his career as a figure painter, eventually devoted himself to portraiture entirely. He was elected an associate of the National Academy of Design, New York, in 1878, and a full academician in 1880. Porter opened his studio, at 3 Washington Square North, in New York in 1880. Today, he is best known for his portraits. He was also the artist behind the portrait of Caroline Astor’s niece and grandniece, Helen Suydam Cutting, wife of Robert Fulton Cutting and Ruth Hunter Cutting who would go on to marry into the Auchincloss family. The portrait has been kept with the family for generations.

Aside from study at Harvard, Porter's primary education seems to have consisted of several trips to Europe in 1872, 1875, 1878, and 1881. Cities which particularly interested him were Paris and Venice. By the early 1870s, Porter had established a successful portrait studio in Boston. His mark was made in New York in 1877 when a group of works he exhibited at the NAD Annual caused something of a critical sensation. He was soon elected to the Academy's membership (although he had to wait until 1903 to be elected to the Society of American Artists), and in 1883 he opened a New York studio, dividing his time for several years between Manhattan and Boston. His summers were usually spent in Newport, Rhode Island.

=== Gallery ===
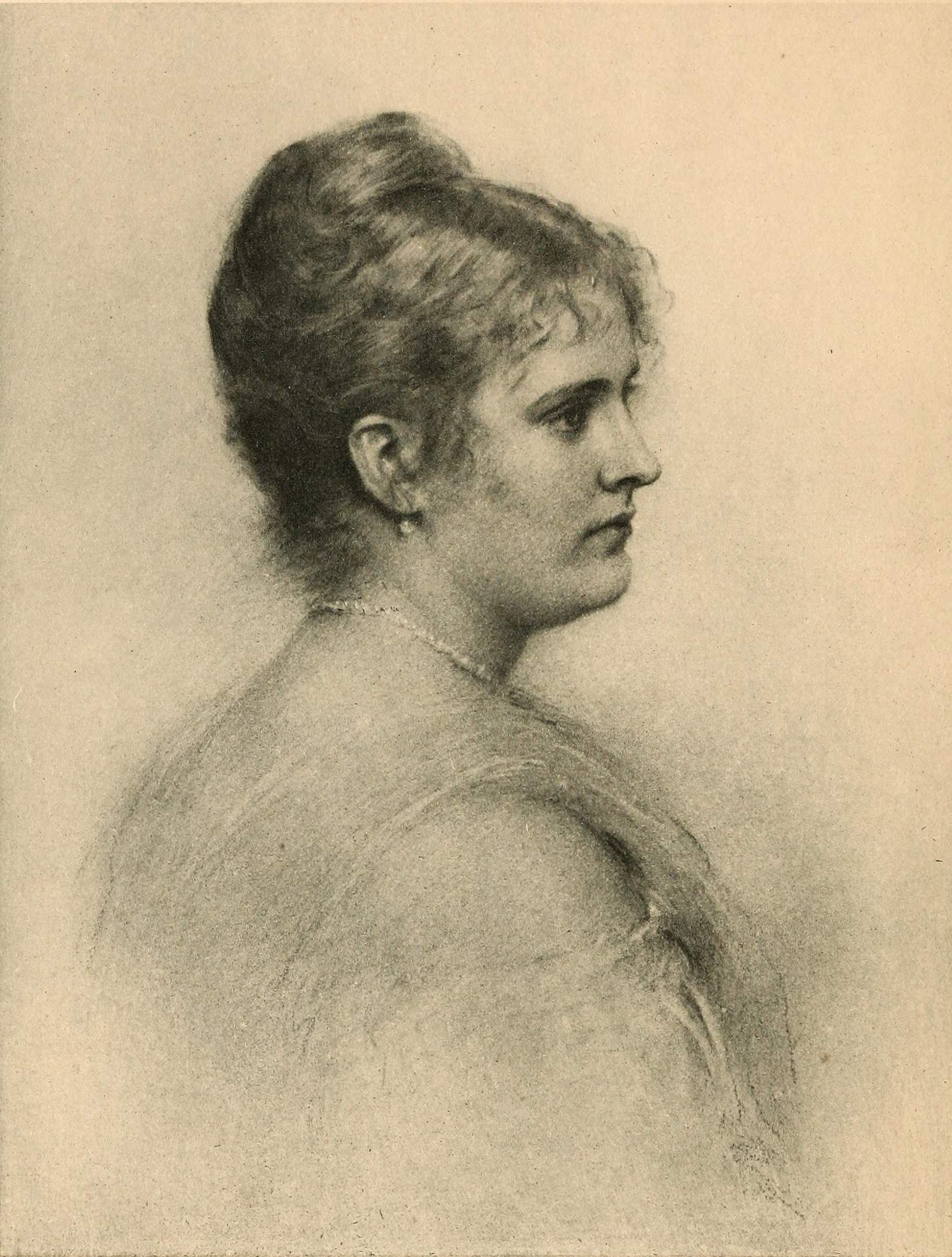
Portrait of Maud Howe, 1870s

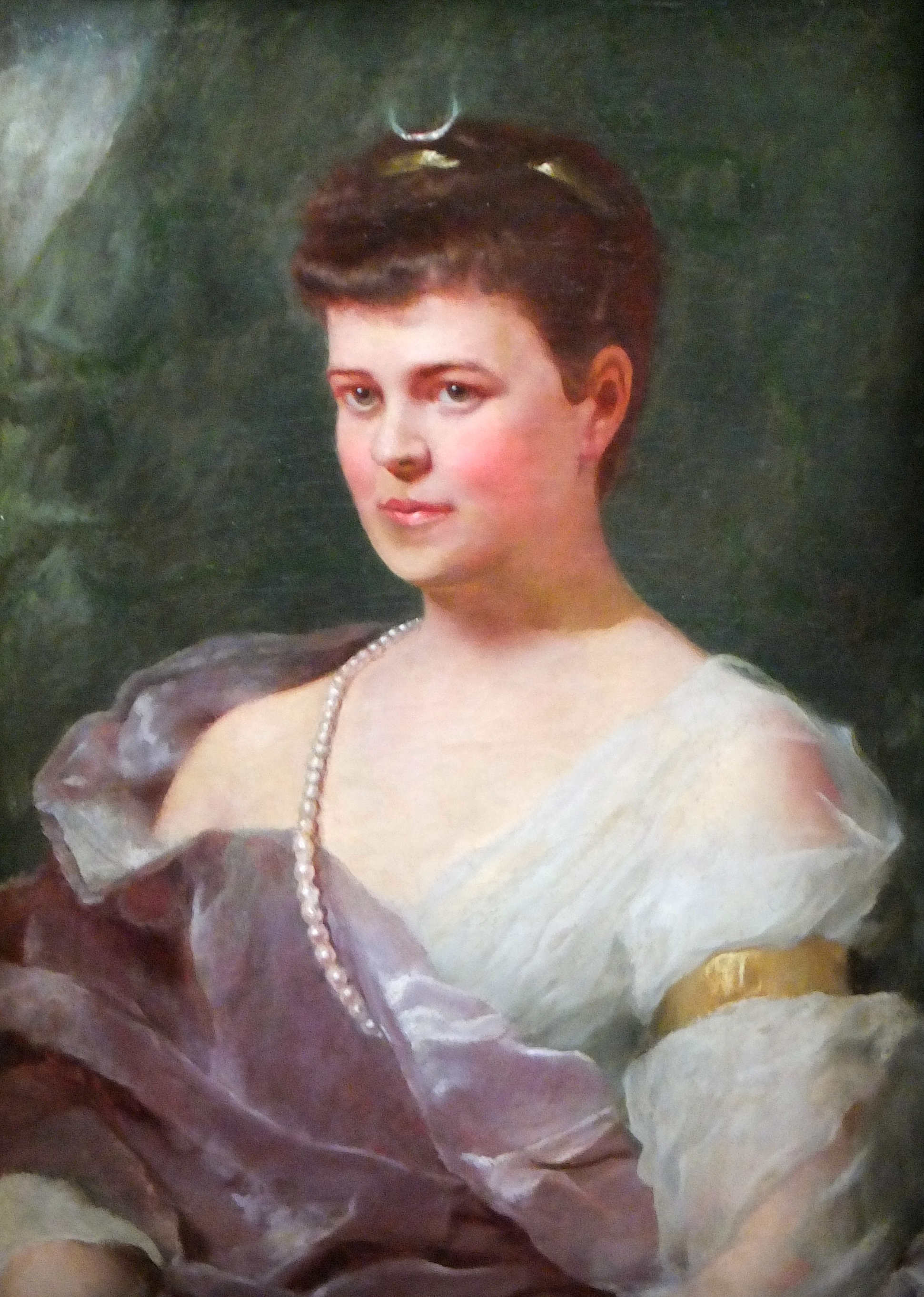
Portrait of Alva (née Smith) Vanderbilt Belmont, c. 1876

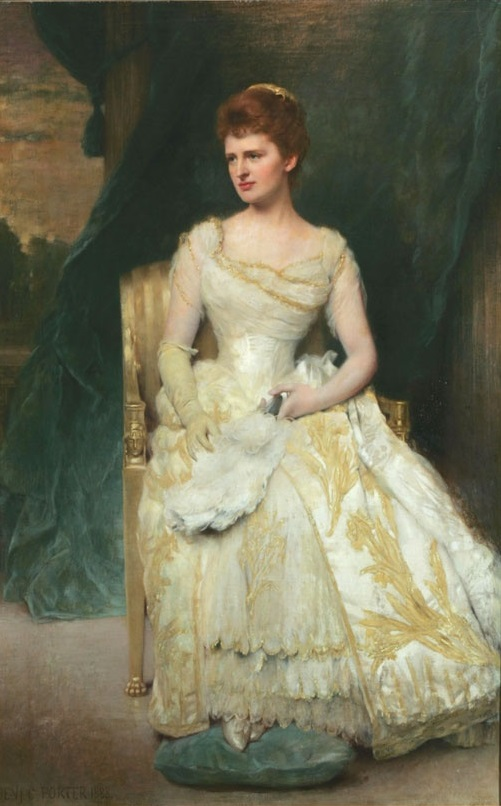
Portrait of Emily Thorn (née Vanderbilt) Sloane, 1888

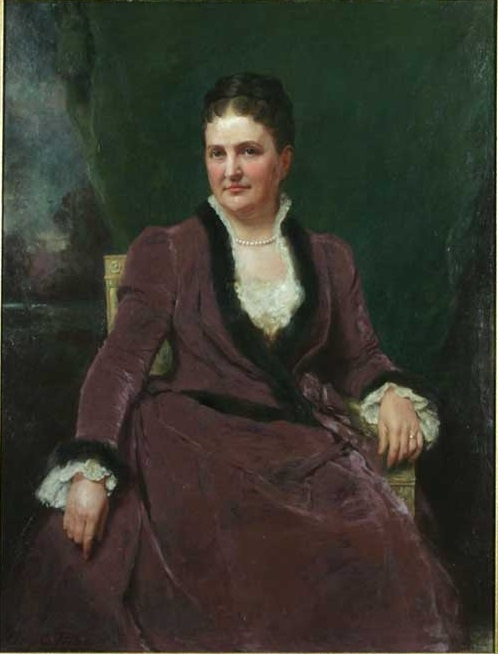
Portrait of Maria Louisa (née Kissam) Vanderbilt

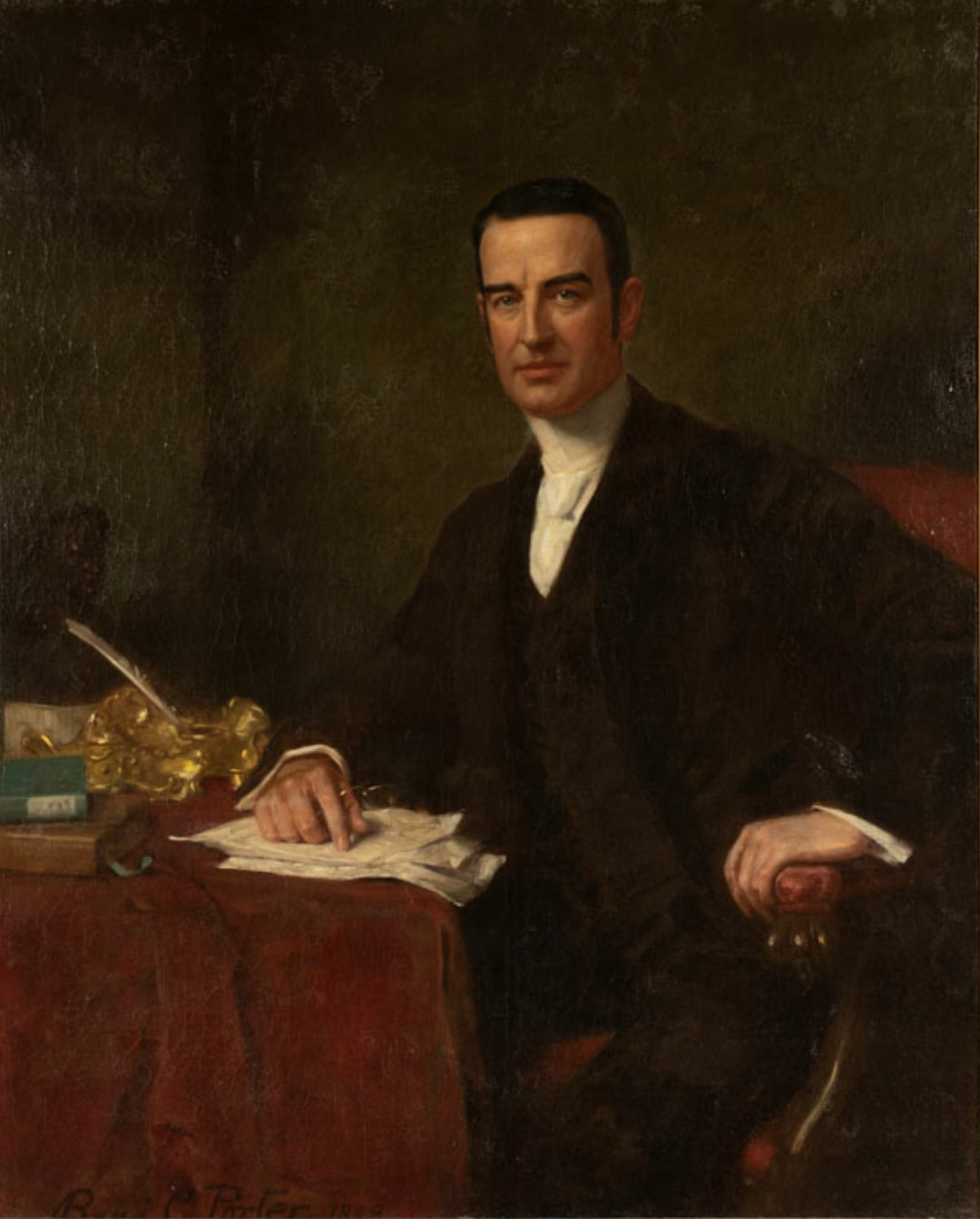
Portrait of Cornelius Vanderbilt II

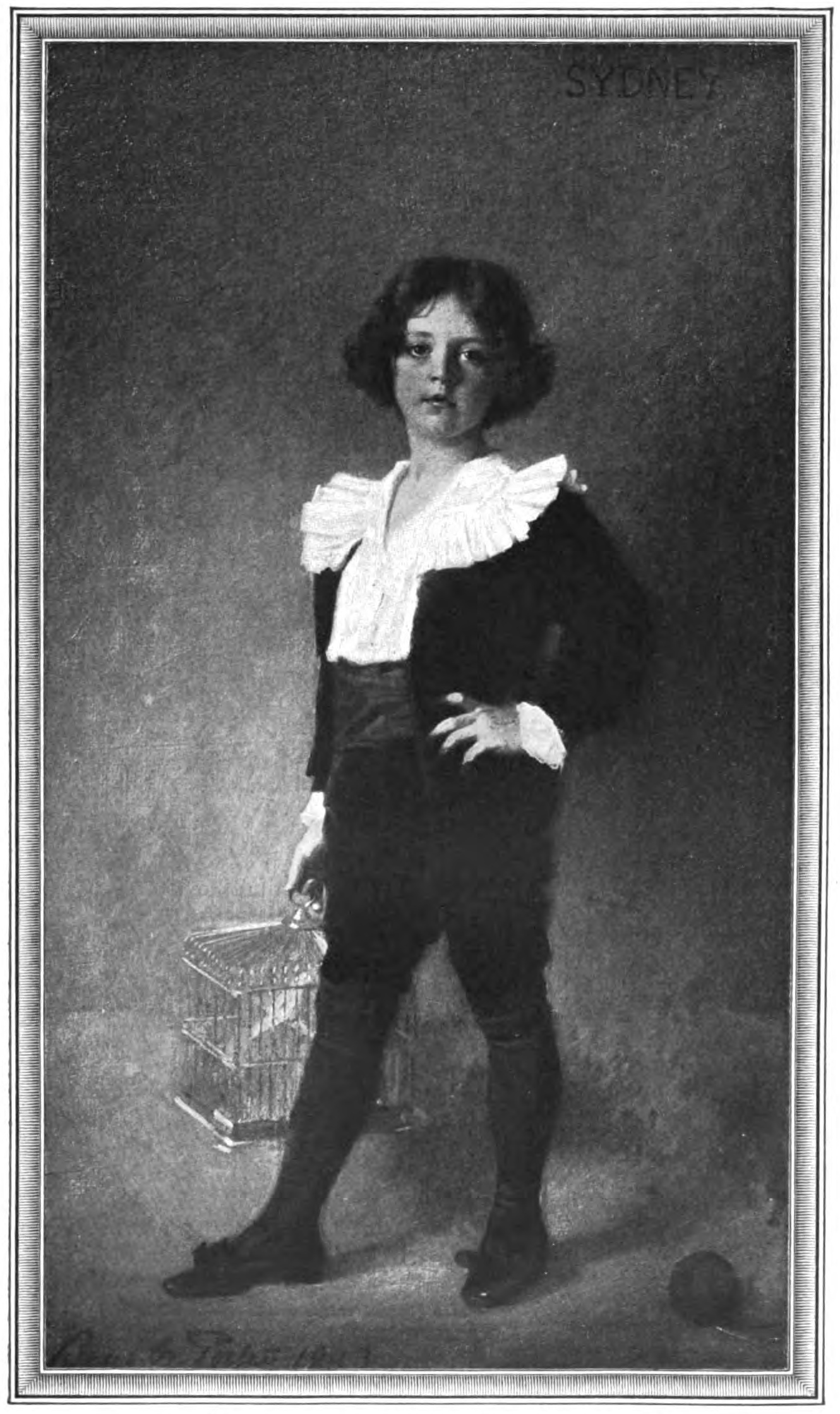
Portrait of the Porter's son, Sydney, 1901

== Personal life ==
In 1887, Porter married Mary Louise Clark of Bridgeport, Connecticut. In 1892, both Benjamin and his wife were included in Ward McAllister's list of "Four Hundred", purported to be an index of New York's best families, published in The New York Times. Conveniently, 400 was the number of people that could fit into Mrs. Astor's ballroom. Porter was a member of the Tuxedo Club and the National Arts Tavern Club in Boston.

He died at his residence, 22 West 11th Street in New York City, on April 2, 1908. His funeral was held at the Church of the Ascension on Fifth Avenue and West 10th Street.
