= Elm Court (Lenox and Stockbridge, Massachusetts) =

Historic house in Massachusetts, United States

- U.S. National Register of Historic Places
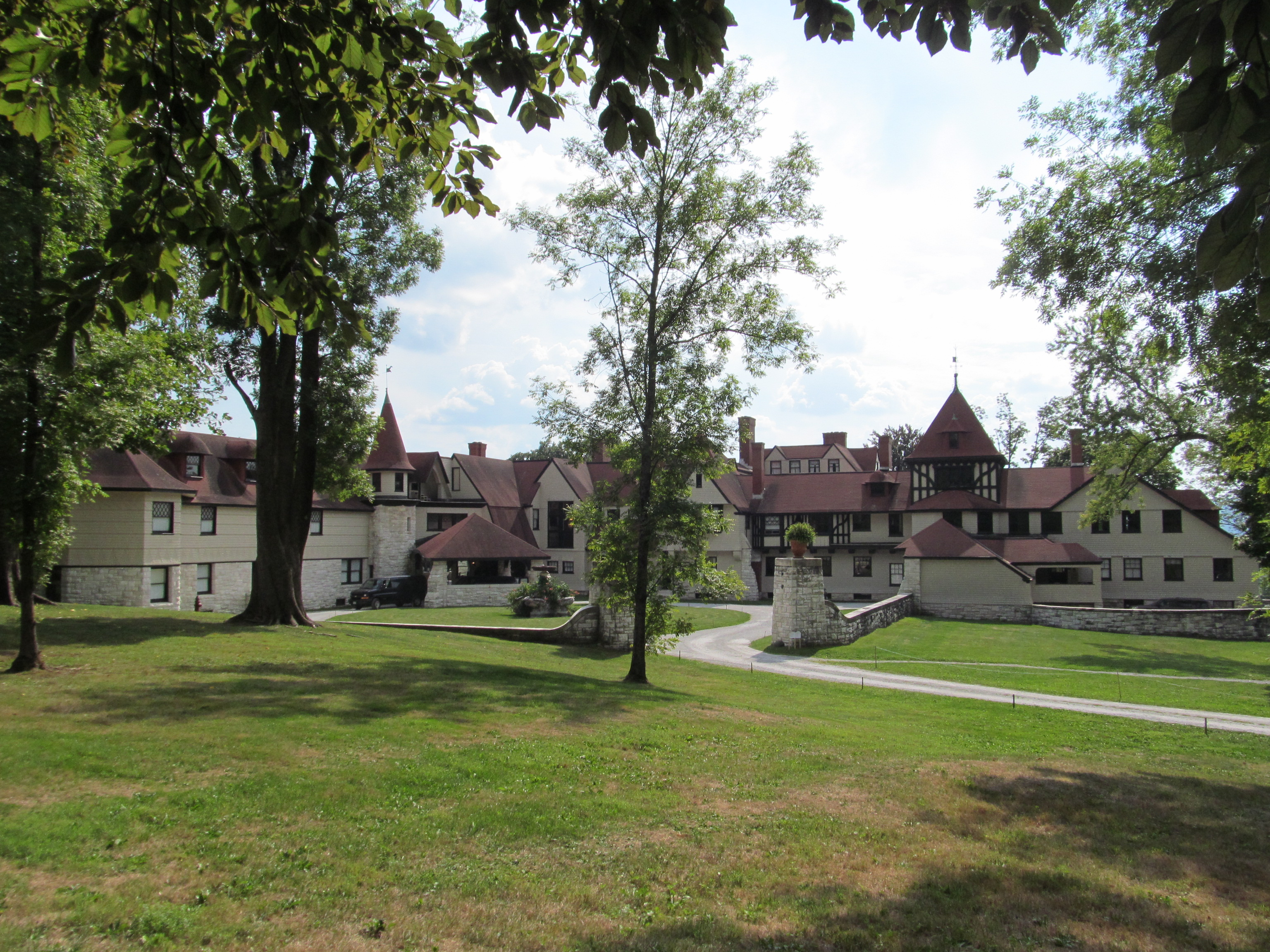
- Elm Court

- Location within Massachusetts Location within the United States
- Location: 310 Old Stockbridge Rd, Lenox, MA
- Coordinates: 42°20′19″N 73°17′31″W
- Built: 1885
- Architects: Peabody & Stearns
- Architectural style: Tudor Revival, Shingle Style
- NRHP reference No.: 85003184
- Added to NRHP: December 30, 1985

Elm Court is a former Vanderbilt mansion located on Old Stockbridge Road, straddling the town line between Lenox and Stockbridge, Massachusetts. It is listed on the National Register of Historic Places and until July 2012 was owned and operated as a hotel by descendants of the original owners.

Elm Court was built as the Berkshire summer home of William Douglas Sloane and Emily Thorn Vanderbilt, a member of the wealthy American Vanderbilt family. Designed by premier architectural firm Peabody and Stearns, with gardens and landscape design by Frederick Law Olmsted, Elm Court is the largest Shingle style house in the United States, with 106 rooms.

== Commercial use, decline and restoration ==
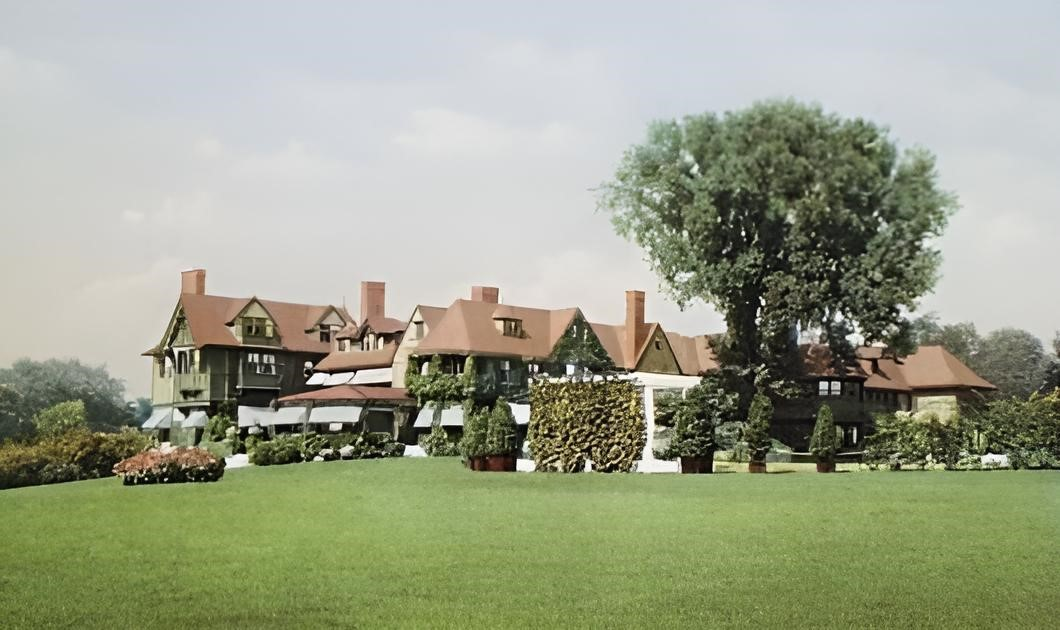
Elm Court, Lenox, Massachusetts, c. 1903

Upon the passing of Emily in 1946, then owners Colonel Helm George Wilde and his wife Marjorie Field Wilde (great-granddaughter of William H. Vanderbilt) opened Elm Court in 1948 as an Inn (Elm Court Club, Inc.) with an accommodation for up to 60 people. Dancing and dinner open to the public Saturday nights made for a popular spot for many years. Knott Hotels Corporation were retained as the operators of the Inn.

The Wildes - who also owned the neighboring 1,300-acre (5.3 km^{2}) High Lawn manor (designed by Delano and Aldrich) and farm - pursued the Inn concept in order to preserve the estate and provide summer employment for the area's many teachers. The Inn eventually faltered and due to overwhelming operational costs, the house shuttered in 1959.

While some fine furnishings were removed, the house was largely left merely locked up but intact as it had been in 1959. Unoccupied, secluded, and only lightly patrolled, it fell prey over the years to massive vandalism, outright looting, some arson, and a general derelict state by the end of the 20th century. The massive elm tree on the grounds, for which the property was named died in March 1953 of Dutch Elm disease.

Upon the death of George Wilde in 1998, the Elm Court passed to his daughter Lila Wilde Berle of Stockbridge. Lila's husband, Peter A. A. Berle (1937–2007), was a highly respected environmentalist, New York State assemblyman, commissioner of the State Department of Environmental Conservation and president of the National Audubon Society She in turn sold the estate in 1999 to her son, Robert Berle, great-great-grandson of the Sloanes, and his wife, Sonya, for just under $1 million. They undertook a major restoration effort, repairing original details and adding new wiring, plumbing, heating, and opened the property as a luxury Inn while portions of the home remained a work in progress with restoration.

In August 2005, the estate - with the manor house, greenhouse, carriage house and cottage - was placed on the market for sale for an asking price of $21,500,000 on 90 acres (360,000 m^{2}). By comparison the highest price for any Berkshire County property sold was recorded January, 2007 for Southmayd Farm for $6.9 million

The property's asking price was reduced to $17.5 million in July 2006 and a contract was signed for sale to a Florida-based hotel business ('The Kessler Collection'). However that deal fell through and was mutually terminated by both parties. Last listed at $14 million, it was taken off the market at the end of 2006.

In the Spring of 2010, the Town of Stockbridge approved a permit for an 18-room hotel in the mansion. The Town of Lenox approved a sign permit for the property in the summer of 2010. These permits are in addition to the restaurant permit for the original horse stable, already in place. (Town of Stockbridge, MA; Board of Selectmen Special Permit Hearing January 6, 2003).

== Commercial sale in 2012; ending the last of the Berkshire cottages held by family ==
In July 2012 it was announced that the property in its entirety (55,000-square foot mansion on 89 acres) was sold to a Colorado-based group for $9.8 million for a proposed 112-room hotel, which included a spa and restaurant component. That is believed to be the highest price paid for a residential property in Berkshire County history. Prior to this, Elm Court had been the last of the Berkshire cottages to have remained in the family of its original owners. Robert Berle is a descendant of William Douglas Sloane and Emily Vanderbilt.

A $50 million renovation of the property was due to take place in 2020. These plans were not realized and the property was again for sale as of November 2020.

The estate was purchased from the existing Colorado-based company in 2022 with new ownership, Vanderbilt Berkshires Estate, LLC. The new owners Linda Susan Law/Trustee of the Linda Susan Law Trust, a real estate developer and investor, and her business partner Dr. Richard Peiser, have a defined vision to restore the historic Estate to its architectural origins which include Peabody & Stearns as well as Frederick Law Olmsted. Its future includes The Manor House as the centerpiece transforming into a luxury boutique hotel featuring 26 guestrooms and a 60-seat restaurant. In addition, twelve Olmsted Lodge buildings, each with four guest suites (48 in total), will be developed. Home sites for single-family custom residences (38) will also be phased in as well as a new Spa in the existing Greenhouse building.

== External media: video ==
In 2004 Bob Vila's television show 'Home Again' did a multi-segment visit to Elm Court with the Berle family.

BVTV - Home Again 'Introducing Elm Court' 3 min 46 sec

== See also ==
- Berkshire Cottages
- Vanderbilt houses
- National Register of Historic Places listings in Berkshire County, Massachusetts
- Peabody and Stearns
- Frederick Law Olmsted
