= Emily Vanderbilt Sloane =

American socialite (1874–1970)

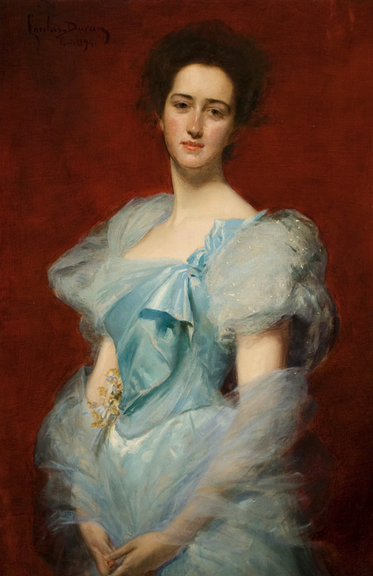
- Born: September 17, 1874; Manhattan, New York City, New York, United States
- Died: February 22, 1970 (aged 95); 136 East 64th Street; Manhattan, New York City, New York, United States
- Resting place: Vanderbilt Family Mausoleum, Staten Island, New York, U.S.
- Occupations: Heiress, author, philanthropist
- Spouse: John Henry Hammond
- Children: Adele Sloane Hammond; Alice Frances Hammond; Rachel Hammond; John Henry Hammond II
- Parent(s): Emily Thorn Vanderbilt; William Douglas Sloane
- Relatives: See Vanderbilt family

Emily Vanderbilt Sloane Hammond (September 17, 1874 – February 22, 1970) was an author, philanthropist, and socialite. She was a member of the Vanderbilt family, and mother of music producer John Hammond. She was a keen musician and was president of numerous charitable societies.

== Biography ==
Emily Vanderbilt Sloane was born on September 17, 1874, to Emily Thorn Vanderbilt (1852–1946) and W. & J. Sloane heir William Douglas Sloane (1844–1915). She was the granddaughter of William Henry Vanderbilt.

She was raised in New York, and summered at Elm Court, a mammoth shingle-style cottage in Lenox, Massachusetts. Uninterested in the débutante social circles of her peers, she preferred playing the piano at Sunday school. She took a keen interest in religion, delivering small sermons to her brothers and sisters, and later considered her faith important to mask the guilt of being born into a wealthy family.

As an adult, Emily regularly attended opera and public lectures, and employed a social secretary. She disliked alcohol and tobacco and forbade either of them to be consumed in her house.

== Philanthropy ==
Vanderbilt Sloane was enthusiastic about donating money to good causes and social demands. She was a supporter of educationalist Martha Berry and made many financial contributions to Berry College; correspondence between the two women was later made public. A major activity of hers was the restoration of the Theodore Roosevelt House at 28 East 20th Street. She was president of the Women's Roosevelt Memorial Association for many years. She was president of the Home Thrift Association, supporting a Yorkville settlement house, and was president for 43 years of the Three Arts Club, a residence for women studying music, painting and drama. She was a founder of the Parents' League of New York in 1914, and later became its president. She was the president of the Peoples' Chorus of New York, and a commissioner of the Girl Scouts of Westchester County.

After her husband's death in 1949, she donated the family's 277-acre Mount Kisco estate, Dellwood, to the Moral Rearmament movement.

== Residence ==
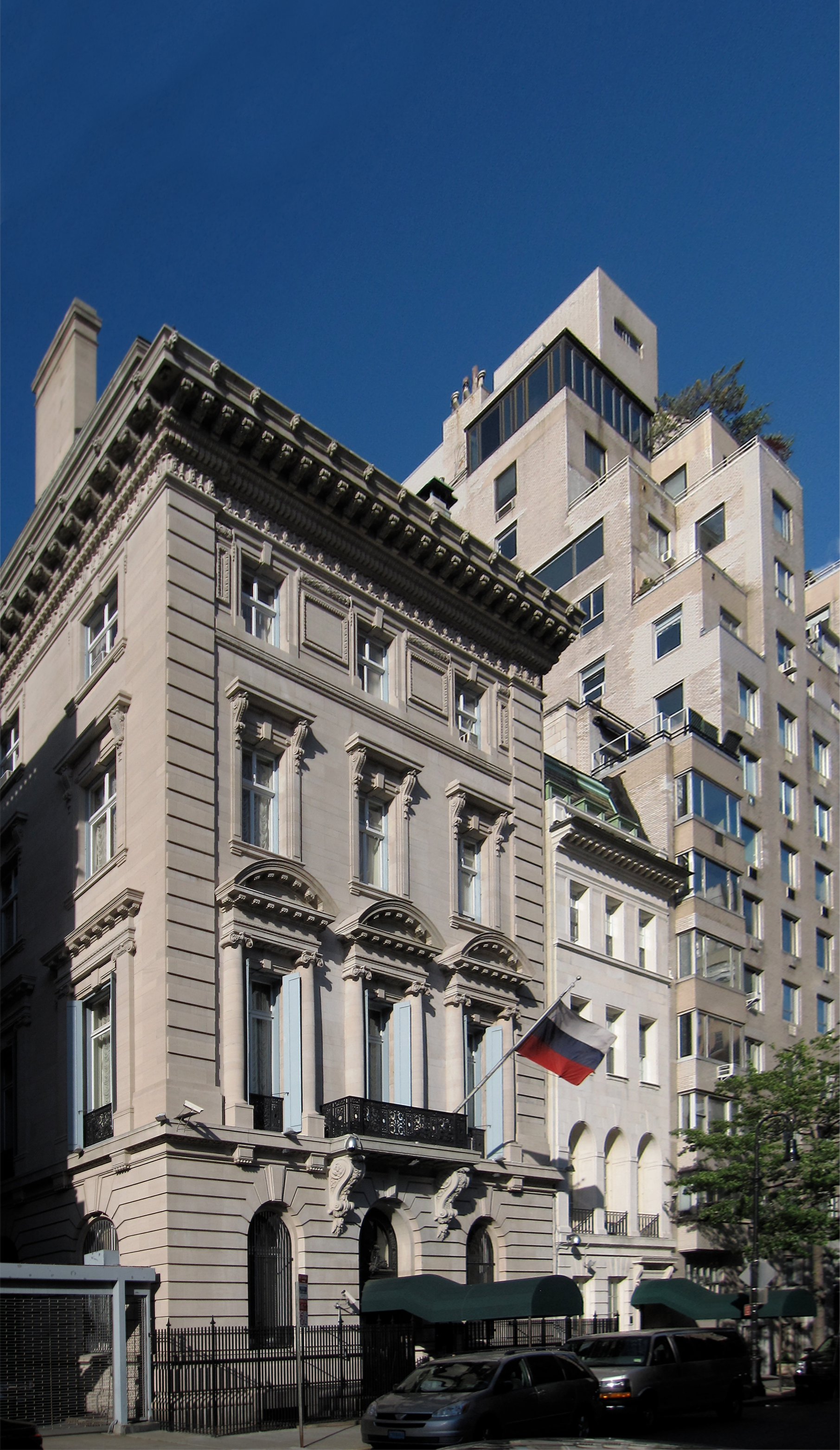
John Henry Hammond House, home of Emily Vanderbilt Sloane Hammond

Emily's parents commissioned the architectural firm of Carrère and Hastings to design a mansion for the couple at 9 East 91st, on land purchased from Andrew Carnegie; it was known as the John Henry Hammond House. The house has since been restored and is now the Consulate General of the Russian Federation.

The reception rooms on the second floor – a ballroom, library and music room – routinely sat three hundred guests, at concerts often featuring Vanderbilt Sloane on piano, and her son John Hammond Jr. playing violin or viola. Many greats of jazz played in the house, including Benny Goodman Rachel Hammond Breck noted that her mother's parties never went for long, mainly due to her refusal to serve alcohol.

== Personal life ==
On April 5, 1899, she married John Henry Hammond at St. Bartholomew's Episcopal Church. He was the brother of Ogden H. Hammond, U.S. Ambassador to Spain. Together, they had four children:

- Adele Sloane Hammond (1902–1998), who married John K. Olyphant Jr. (1895–1973) in 1927. After his death in 1973, she married John Josiah Emery Jr. (1898–1976).
- Alice Frances Hammond (1905–1978), who married George Arthur Victor Duckworth (1901–1986) in March 1927. They divorced in January 1942. She married Benny Goodman (d. 1986) in March 1942.
- Rachel Hammond (1908–2007), who married Richard L. McClenahan. They divorced in February 1942 and she married John Gordon Ferrier Speiden (1900−1970) in May 1942. They also divorced and she married Manley du Pont Breck (1906−1972) in 1961.
- John Henry Hammond II (1910–1987), who married Jemison "Jemy" McBride in 1941. They divorced in 1948 and in 1949, he married Esme O'Brien Sarnoff.

John Henry Hammond I died in 1949. Emily died on February 22, 1970, at her home at 136 East 64th Street, aged 95.

=== Descendants ===
Her son John Henry Hammond became a jazz impresario and record producer. Grandson John P. Hammond (1942–2026) was a blues singer and guitarist. Daughter Alice Frances Hammond married jazz musician Benny Goodman. Her daughter, Adele Hammond, was the paternal grandmother of actor Timothy Olyphant (b. 1968).

== Publications ==
- The Golden Treasury of the Bible (1919)
- Comfort Thoughts for Those at Home (1923)
- A Trip that Kindles (1953)
