= Richard M. Tobin =

American banker and diplomat

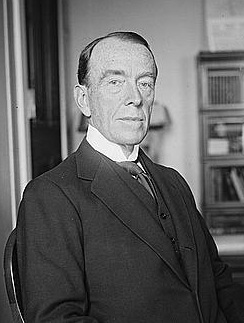

U.S. Minister to the Netherlands
- In office May 1, 1923 – August 29, 1929
- Monarch: Wilhelmina
- President: Calvin Coolidge
- Preceded by: William Phillips
- Succeeded by: Gerrit J. Diekema

Personal details
- Born: Richard Montgomery Tobin; April 9, 1866 San Francisco, California
- Died: January 23, 1952 (aged 85) San Francisco, California
- Party: Republican
- Spouse: Florence Adele Sloane Burden (m. 1936)
- Parent(s): Richard Tobin; Mary Regan
- Education: St. Ignatius College
- Awards: Grand Cross of Orange-Nassau; Knight of the Order of Malta; Légion d'honneur

Richard Montgomery Tobin (April 9, 1866 – January 23, 1952) was an American banker and diplomat. He was a civic leader and philanthropist in San Francisco, California and served as United States Minister to the Netherlands.

== Early life ==
Richard Montgomery Tobin was born in San Francisco on April 9, 1866. He was the son of Mary (née Regan) Tobin and Richard Tobin, one of the earliest leaders of California after it became a possession of the United States. He was educated at St. Ignatius College (now the University of San Francisco).

== Career ==
In 1889, he became an officer and member of the board of directors of the Hibernia Savings & Loan Association (later the Hibernia Bank), which had been founded by his father and uncle. He became Secretary and Treasurer in 1906, and President in 1933. Tobin was also involved in politics as a progressive Republican.

Tobin maintained homes in Pacifica, California and San Francisco, and was active in several San Francisco organizations as a board member, officer, and benefactor, including the San Francisco Symphony Orchestra, San Francisco Opera, San Francisco Ballet, San Francisco Musical Association, and Catholic church.

Tobin joined the United States Navy Reserve for World War I, receiving a commission as a Lieutenant in December, 1917. He served in France throughout the war, working at the U.S. embassy as the officer in charge of cable traffic between Europe and the U.S., including censoring messages to ensure that secrets were not unintentionally revealed.

After the war Tobin remained in Europe, serving as an assistant to the U.S. Naval attaché and a member of the staff supporting the U.S. Commission which took part in negotiating the Treaty of Versailles. He received the Legion of Honor from France in recognition of his military service.

In 1923, Tobin was appointed U.S. Minister to the Netherlands, and he served until 1929. At the completion of his service he was presented with the Grand Cross of Orange-Nassau. In 1931 he was made a Knight of the Order of Malta. Tobin was initially also appointed as Ambassador to Luxembourg, which had been a dual appointment with the Netherlands for several years. He did not serve in this post because it was established as a separate embassy in 1923.

=== Foreign awards ===
Knight Grand Cross with Swords of the Order of Orange-Nassau (Netherlands) 1929

== Personal life ==
Tobin remained a bachelor until 1936, when he married Florence Adele Sloane Burden (1873–1960), the widow of wealthy businessman James A. Burden Jr. She was a daughter of Emily Thorn Vanderbilt and great-granddaughter of Cornelius Vanderbilt.

Tobin died in San Francisco on January 23, 1952. He was buried in San Mateo's Holy Cross Cemetery.

Diplomatic posts
Preceded by William Phillips	U.S. Minister to the Netherlands; 1923–1929	Succeeded by Gerrit J. Diekema
