= Emily Thorn Vanderbilt =

American philanthropist

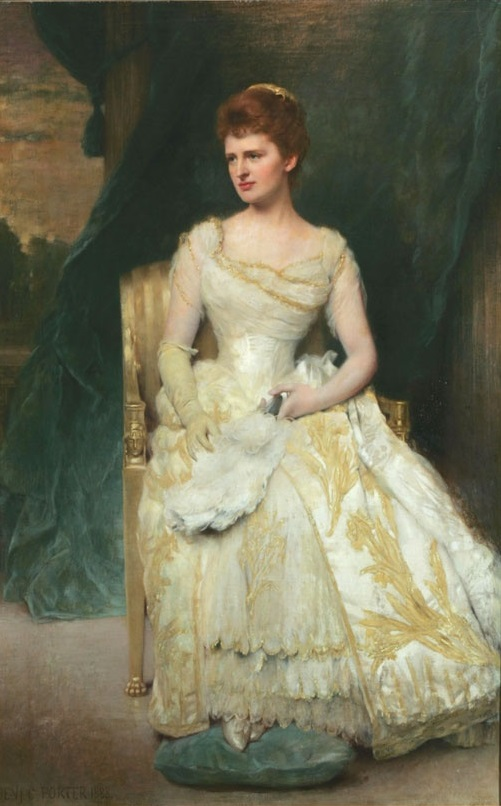
- Mrs. William Douglas Sloane (Emily Thorn Vanderbilt) by Benjamin Curtis Porter
- Born: January 31, 1852; Staten Island, New York, US
- Died: July 28, 1946 (aged 94); Lenox, Massachusetts, US
- Occupation: Philanthropist
- Spouses: William Douglas Sloane (m. 1872; died 1915) Henry White (m. 1920; died 1927)
- Children: Florence Adele Sloane; Emily Vanderbilt Sloane; Lila Vanderbilt Sloane; William Douglas Sloane Jr.; Malcolm Douglas Vanderbilt Sloane
- Parent(s): William Henry Vanderbilt; Maria Louisa Kissam

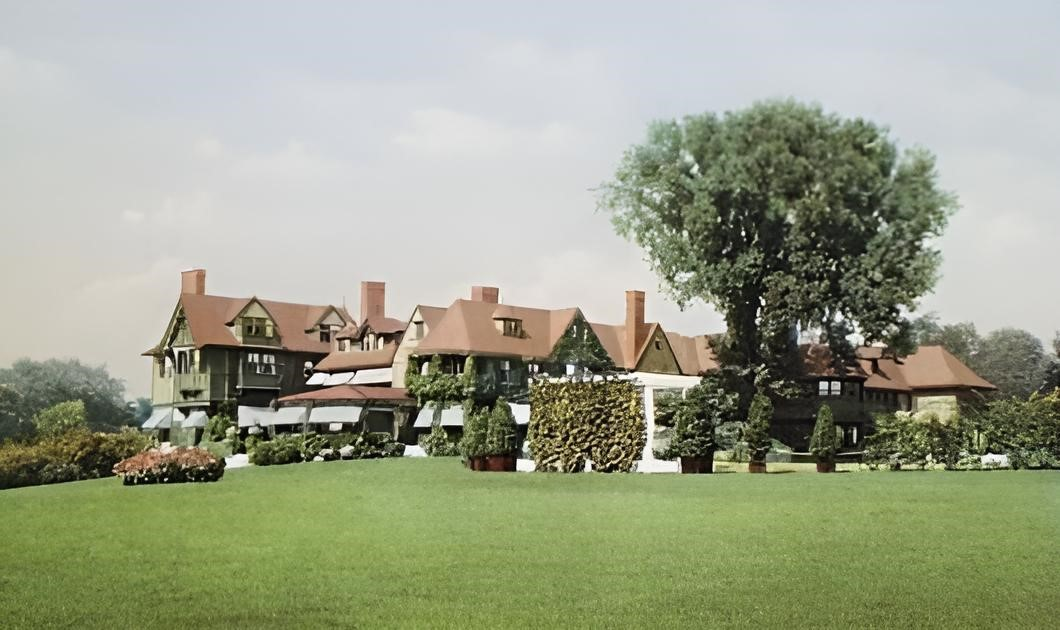
Elm Court, Lenox, Massachusetts, 1903

Emily Thorn Vanderbilt (January 31, 1852 – July 28, 1946) was an American philanthropist and a member of the prominent Vanderbilt family. She financed the creation of New York's Sloane Hospital for Women in 1888 with an endowment of more than $1,000,000.

== Early life ==
She was born in 1852 as the fifth child, and second daughter, of William Henry Vanderbilt (1821–1885) and Maria Louisa Kissam (1821–1896). Her paternal grandparents were Cornelius Vanderbilt (1794–1877) and his wife, Sophia Johnson (1795–1868).

== Philanthropy and work ==
She financed the creation of New York's Sloane Hospital for Women with an endowment of more than $1,000,000. The hospital is now part of NewYork-Presbyterian / Morgan Stanley Children's Hospital and still in use today.

In 1885, she and her husband commissioned Peabody and Stearns to build Elm Court, the mammoth shingle-style 'cottage' in Lenox, Massachusetts.

== Personal life ==
In 1872, the twenty year old Vanderbilt was married to William Douglas Sloane (1844–1915), a brother of Henry T. Sloane of the carpet firm W. & J. Sloane. Together, Emily and William became the parents of three daughters and two sons:

- Florence Adele Sloane (1873–1960), wife of James Abercrombie Burden Jr. and of Richard Montgomery Tobin.
- Emily Vanderbilt Sloane (1874–1970), who married lawyer John Henry Hammond III.
- Lila Vanderbilt Sloane (1878–1934), wife of William Bradhurst Osgood Field.
- William Douglas Sloane Jr. (1883–1884)
- Malcolm Douglas Vanderbilt Sloane (1885–1924), who married Elinor Lee.

The family lived at the Vanderbilt Triple Palace on Fifth Avenue in New York City.

In 1920, after Sloane's death, she married Henry White (1850–1927), American Ambassador to France and Italy, and a signatory of the Treaty of Versailles.

She died on July 28, 1946, in Lenox, Massachusetts.

=== Descendants ===
Emily Thorn Vanderbilt Sloane White's grandchildren include Adele Hammond, paternal grandmother of actor Timothy Olyphant, Alice Frances Hammond, wife of jazz musician Benny Goodman, Rachel Hammond, cattle breeder, and wife of Manley D. Breck, and John Henry Hammond II, talent scout.

== Family tree ==
Emily Thorn Vanderbilt Family Tree

Cornelius Vanderbilt; 1794–1877	Sophia Johnson; 1795–1868
Maria Louisa Kissam; 1821–1896	William Henry Vanderbilt; 1821–1885	Emily Almira Vanderbilt; 1823–1896	William Knapp Thorn; 1807–1887
William Douglas Sloane; 1844–1915	Emily Thorn Vanderbilt; 1852–1946	Henry White; 1850–1927
Florence Adele Sloane; 1873–1960	Lila Sloane; 1879–1934	Emily Vanderbilt Sloane; 1874–1970	John Henry Hammond; 1871–1949
Adele Sloane Hammond; 1902-1998	John Kensett Olyphant, Jr. 1895-1973	Alice Frances Hammond; 1905–1978	Benny Goodman; 1909–1986	Rachel Hammond; 1908–2007	John Henry Hammond II; 1910–1987
