= William Henry Vanderbilt =

American businessman (1821–1885)

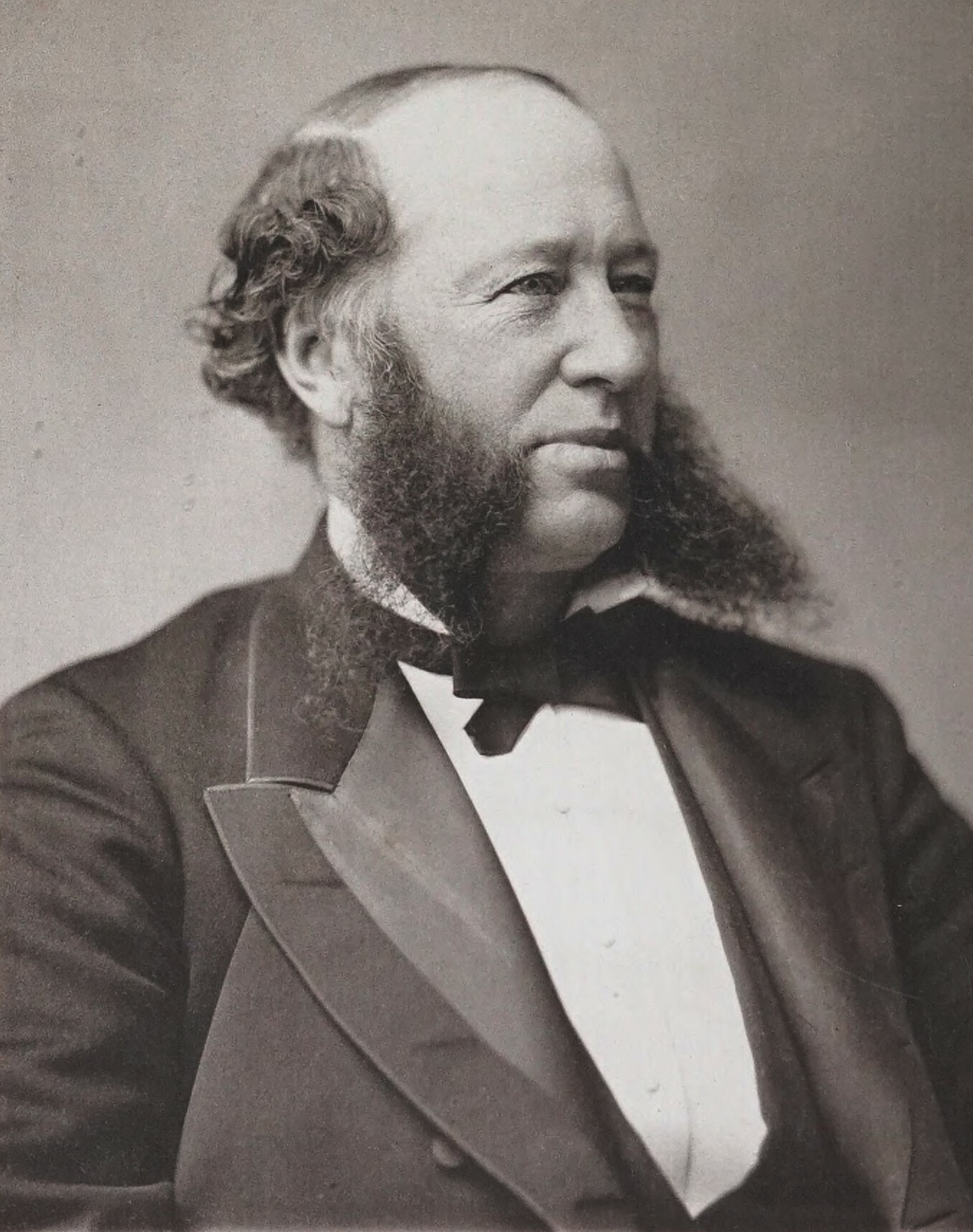
- Vanderbilt in 1882
- Born: May 8, 1821; New Brunswick, New Jersey, U.S.
- Died: December 8, 1885 (aged 64); Manhattan, New York City, U.S.
- Burial place: Vanderbilt Family Cemetery and Mausoleum, Staten Island, New York, U.S.
- Education: Columbia College (1841)
- Occupations: Owner of the New York Central Railroad and other railroads.
- Political party: Republican
- Spouse: Maria Louisa Kissam (m. 1841)
- Children: Cornelius Vanderbilt II; Margaret Louisa Vanderbilt Shepard; Allen Vanderbilt; William Kissam Vanderbilt; Emily Thorn Vanderbilt; Florence Adele Vanderbilt Twombly; Frederick William Vanderbilt; Eliza Osgood Vanderbilt Webb; George Washington Vanderbilt II
- Parent(s): Cornelius Vanderbilt; Sophia Johnson
- Relatives: Vanderbilt family

William Henry Vanderbilt (May 8, 1821 – December 8, 1885) was an American businessman and railroad magnate. Known as "Billy", he was the eldest son of Commodore Cornelius Vanderbilt, an heir to his fortune and a prominent member of the Vanderbilt family. Vanderbilt became the richest American after he took over his father's fortune in 1877 until his own death in 1885, passing on a substantial part of the fortune to his wife and children, particularly to his sons Cornelius II and William. He inherited nearly $100 million from his father. The fortune had doubled when he died fewer than nine years later.

== Early life ==
"Billy" Vanderbilt was born in New Brunswick, New Jersey, on May 8, 1821, to Commodore Cornelius Vanderbilt and Sophia Johnson.

His father Cornelius frequently berated and criticized him, calling his eldest son a "blockhead" and a "blatherskite". Billy longed to show his father that he was not, in fact, a blatherskite, but never dared stand up to the Commodore. A major turning point in their relationship occurred on the family trip to Europe on the steamship Vanderbilt in 1860, after which the two became very close and Billy was given a greater role in business matters.

He matriculated at Columbia College with the class of 1841 but did not graduate, according to official records.

== Career ==
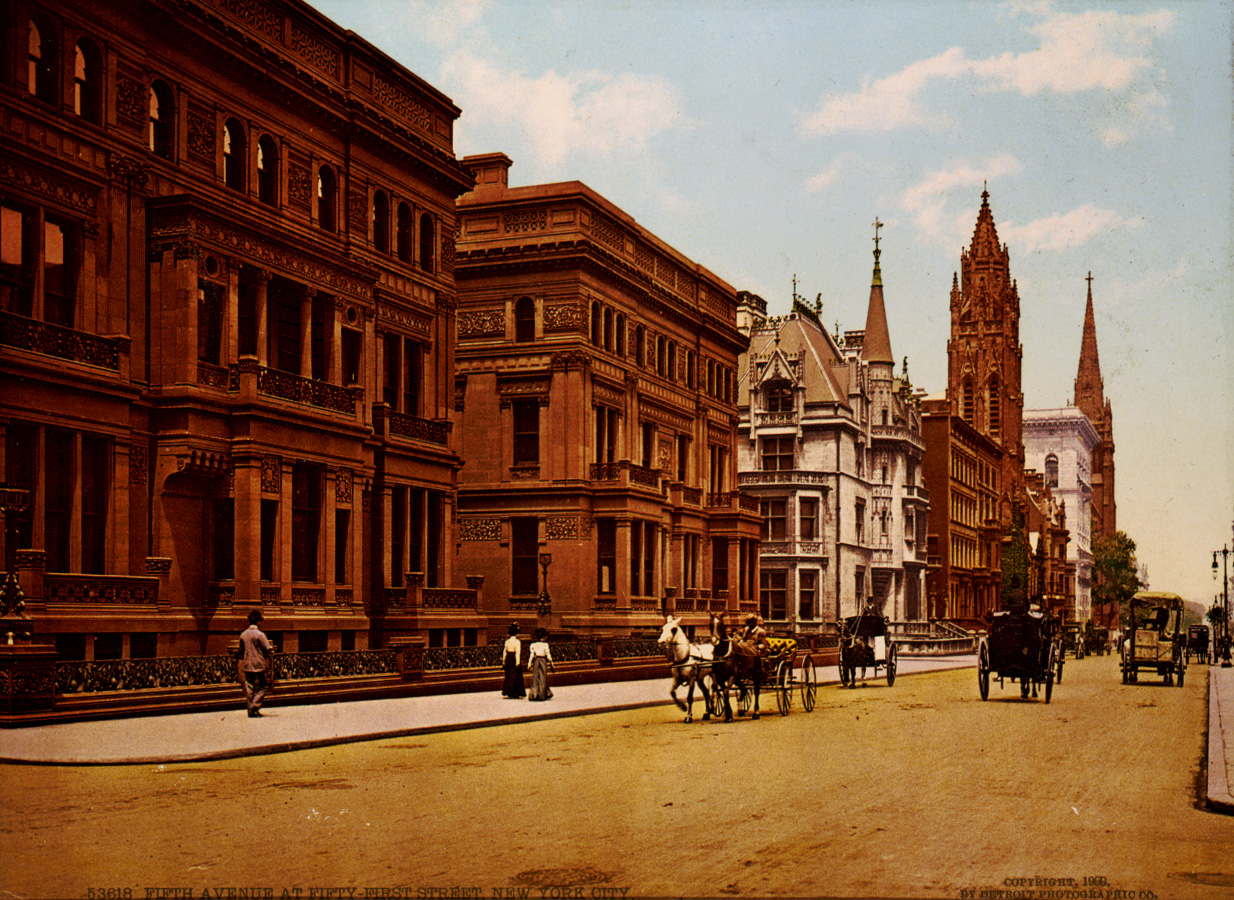
William Henry Vanderbilt's mansion on Fifth Avenue.

His father carefully oversaw his business training, starting him out at age 19 as a clerk in a New York banking house. After joining as an executive of the Staten Island Railway, he was made its president in 1862 and three years later was appointed vice-president of the Hudson River railway.

In 1869, he was made vice-president of the New York Central and Hudson River Railroad, becoming its president in 1877. He took over for his father as president of the Lake Shore and Michigan Southern Railway, the Canada Southern Railway, and the Michigan Central Railroad at the time of Commodore's death.

Vanderbilt's railroad holdings included Chicago, Burlington and Quincy Railroad, the Chicago and Canada Southern Railway, the Detroit and Bay City Railroad, the Hudson River Railroad, the Hudson River Bridge, the Joliet and Northern Indiana Railroad, the Michigan Midland and Canada Railroad, the New York Central and Hudson River Railroad, the New York Central Sleeping Car Company, the New York and Harlem Rail Road, the Spuyten Duyvil and Port Morris Railroad, and the Staten Island Rail-Road.

=== "Public be damned!" ===
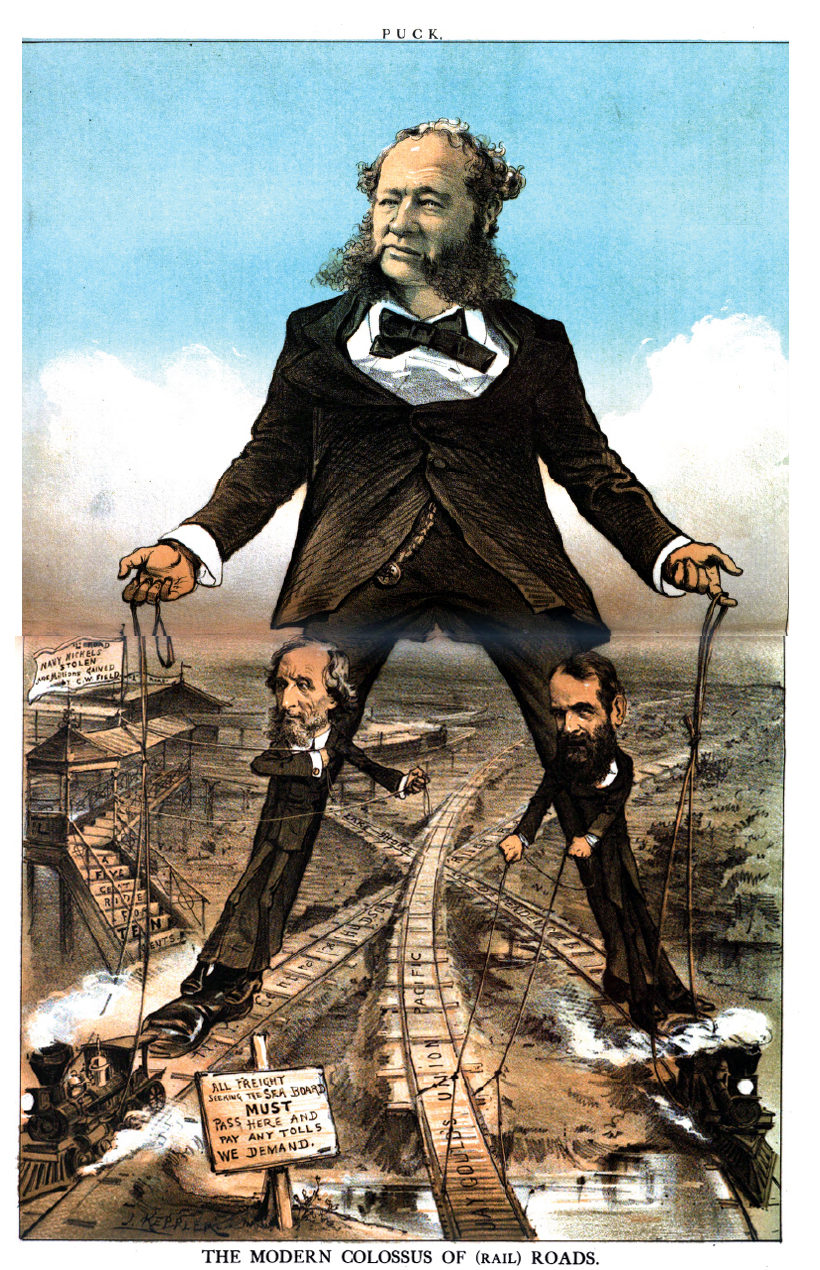
1879 cartoon depicting Vanderbilt as "The Modern Colossus of (Rail) Roads".

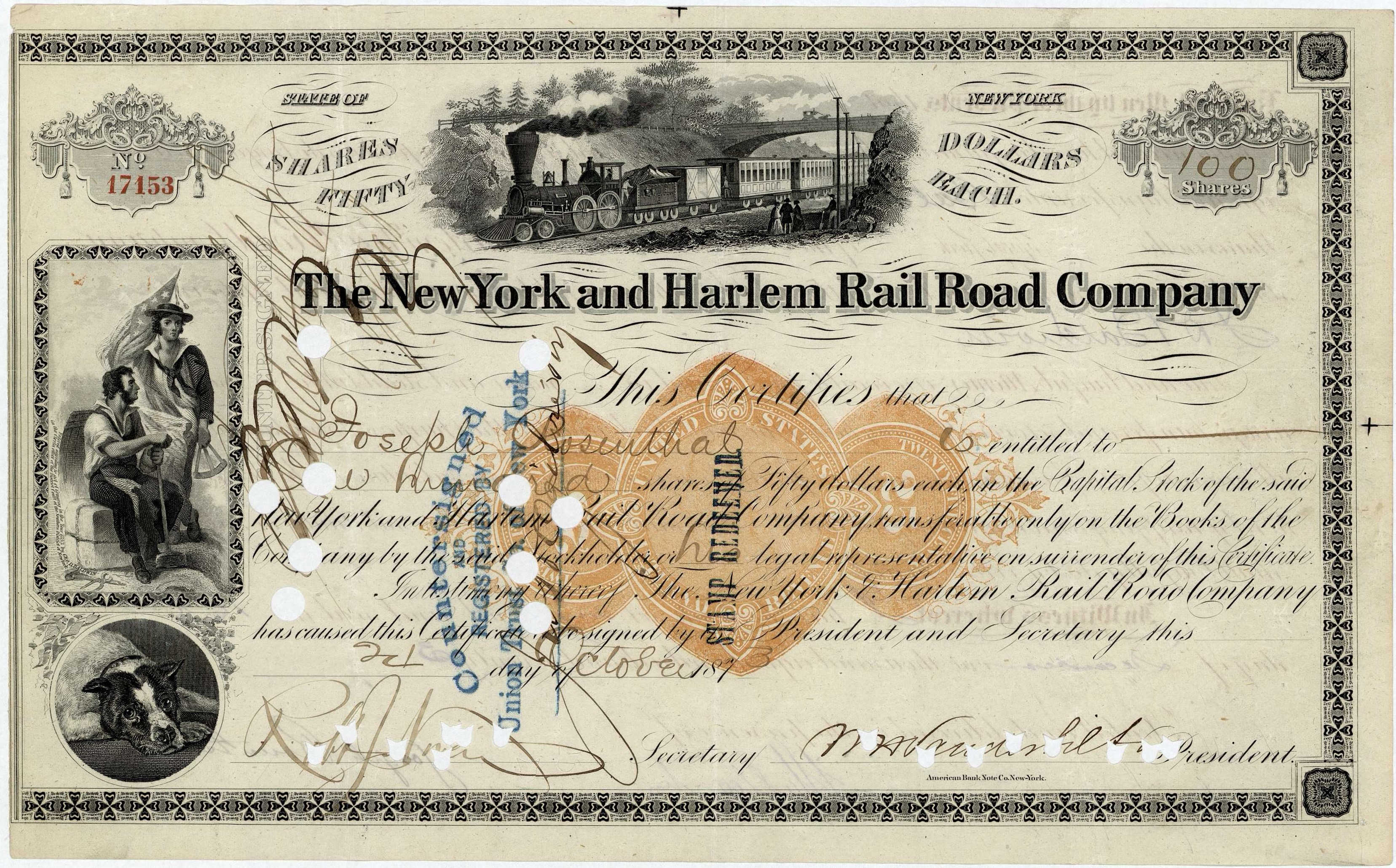
Share of the New York and Harlem Rail Road Company, issued 31 October 1873, signed by William Henry Vanderbilt as president.

In 1883, reporter John Dickinson Sherman questioned him about why he ran the limited express train: "Do your limited express trains pay or do you run them for the accommodation of the public?" Vanderbilt responded with: "Accommodation of the public? The public be damned! We run them because we have to. They do not pay. We have tried again and again to get the different roads to give them up; but they will run them and, of course, as long as they run them we must do the same." The interview was then published in the Chicago Daily News, but Vanderbilt's words were modified. Several accounts of the incident were then disseminated; the accounts vary in terms of who conducted the interview, under what circumstance and what was actually said. Vanderbilt received bad publicity and clarified his response with a subsequent interview by the Chicago Times. In that interview he was quoted saying: "Railroads are not run for the public benefit, but to pay. Incidentally, we may benefit humanity, but the aim is to earn a dividend."

=== Ulysses S. Grant ===
In 1884, the firm Grant & Ward went bankrupt and ruined the investments of both Ulysses S. Grant and Vanderbilt, whom Grant had convinced to invest $150,000. Ferdinand Ward, known as the Napoleon of Wall Street, had (unknowingly to both Grant and Vanderbilt) operated the company as a Ponzi scheme that resulted in financial ruin for many. The other associate, Grant's son Ulysses Jr., apparently was unaware of Ward's Ponzi scheme swindle. Ward was later prosecuted. To pay Vanderbilt back, Grant mortgaged his American Civil War memorabilia, including his sword. Although this did not fully cover the $150,000 debt, Vanderbilt accepted the memorabilia as payment and cleared the debt. Vanderbilt later recouped Grant's other mortgaged war memorabilia and returned them all to Grant's wife, Julia Grant, after Grant's death in 1885.

== Personal life ==
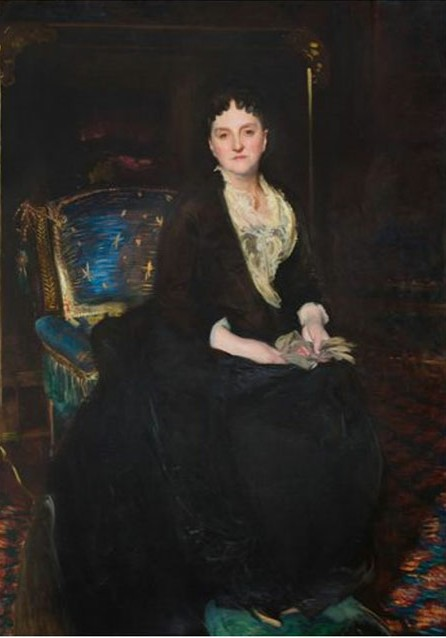
Maria Louisa Kissam, Vanderbilt's wife, by John Singer Sargent, 1888.

In 1841, Billy married Maria Louisa Kissam (1821–1896), daughter of the Reverend Samuel Kissam and Margaret Hamilton Adams. Together, they had nine children:

1. Cornelius Vanderbilt II (1843–1899) who married Alice Claypoole Gwynne; they were the parents of Reginald Claypoole Vanderbilt as well as Gertrude Vanderbilt Whitney, and paternal grandparents of Gloria Laura Vanderbilt.
2. Margaret Louisa Vanderbilt (1845–1924) who married Elliott Fitch Shepard in 1868; they were the parents of Alice Vanderbilt Shepard and Elliott Fitch Shepard Jr.
3. Allen William Vanderbilt (1846–1847) who died at age 11 months.
4. William Kissam Vanderbilt (1849–1920) who married (1) Alva Erskine Smith and (2) Anne Harriman Sands Rutherfurd.
5. Emily Thorn Vanderbilt (1852–1946) who married William Douglas Sloane (1844–1915) and later Ambassador Henry White.
6. Florence Adele Vanderbilt (1854–1952) who married Hamilton McKown Twombly.
7. Frederick William Vanderbilt (1856–1938) who married Louise Anthony Torrance.
8. Eliza Osgood Vanderbilt (1860–1936) who married William Seward Webb.
9. George Washington Vanderbilt II (1862–1914) who married Edith Stuyvesant Dresser.

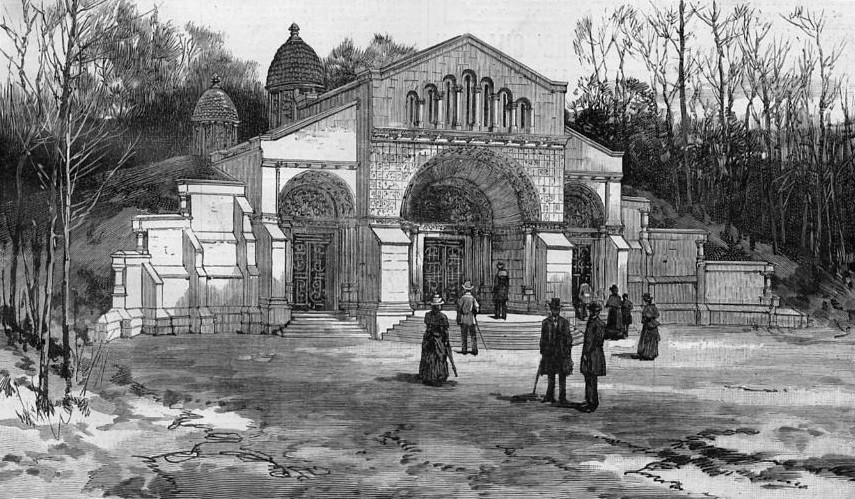
The Vanderbilt Family Cemetery and Mausoleum in New Dorp, Staten Island, where William Henry is buried.

In 1883, he resigned all his company presidencies and had his sons appointed as important chairmen but left the day-to-day running of the businesses to experienced men appointed president.

Vanderbilt died on December 8, 1885, in Manhattan, suffering a stroke during an appointment with Baltimore and Ohio Railroad president Robert Garrett. He was interred in the Vanderbilt Family Mausoleum that he had commissioned in New Dorp, Staten Island. His estate was divided among his eight surviving children and his wife, the bulk of the estate going to his eldest two sons, Cornelius and William. His youngest son George inherited his Staten Island mansion and farm, which became Miller Field airbase and parkland.

=== Philanthropy and legacy ===
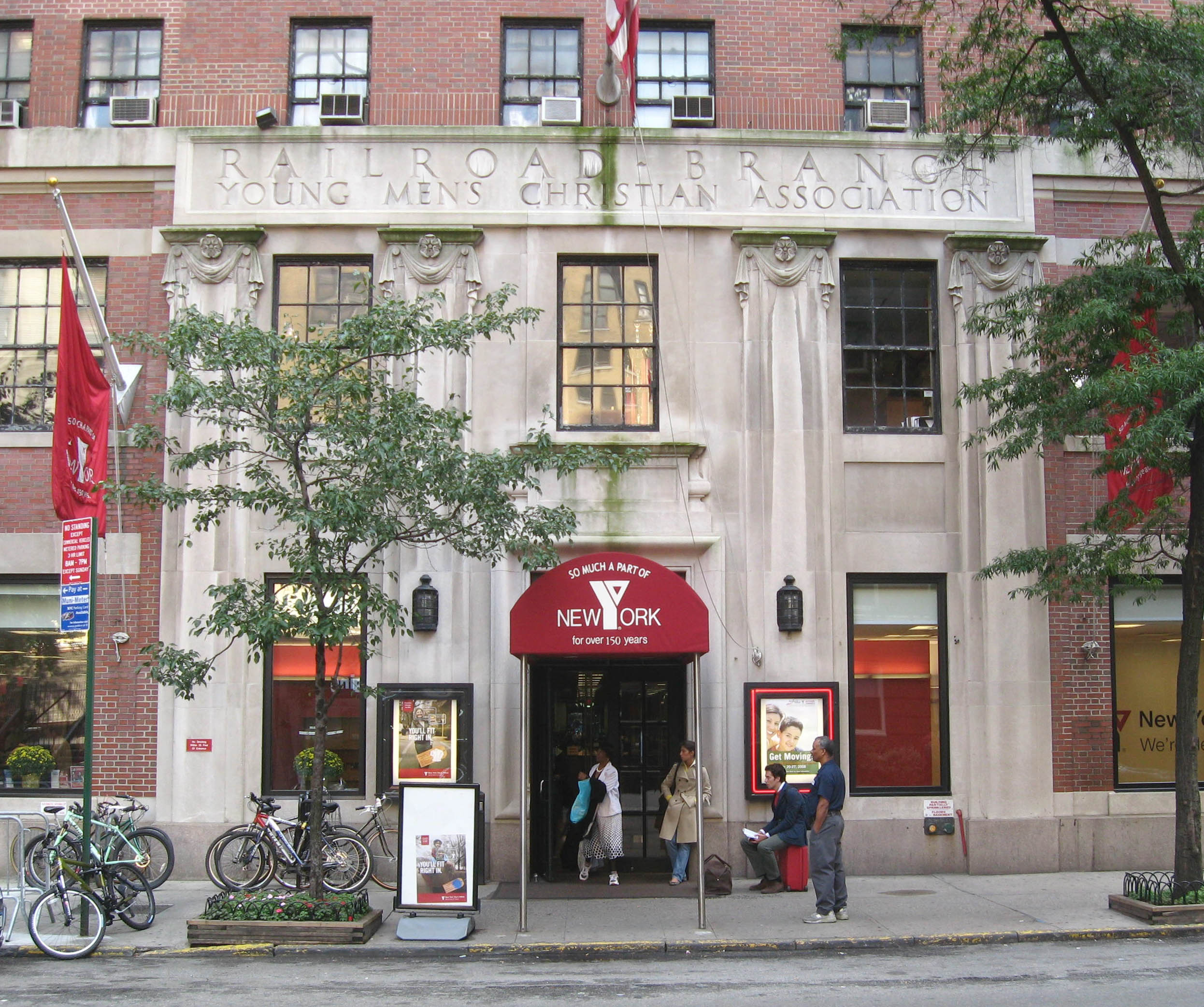
Vanderbilt YMCA, New York.

Vanderbilt was an active philanthropist who gave extensively to philanthropic causes including the YMCA; funding to help establish the Metropolitan Opera (which was not an entirely selfless act; his and other New York "new money" families had been socially excluded from the New York Academy of Music and set up the Metropolitan as competition); and an endowment for the Columbia University College of Physicians and Surgeons. He donated a large amount to complete the McCormick Observatory at the University of Virginia. In 1880, he provided the money for Vanderbilt University in Nashville, Tennessee, to construct the Wesley Hall building for use as the Biblical Department and library and included lecture halls and 160 dormitory rooms for students and professors, as well as a cafeteria. The building was destroyed by fire in 1932, and his son Frederick made another donation to help cover the insurance shortfall and allow a new building to be constructed.

Vanderbilt was an avid art enthusiast; his collection included some of the most valuable works of the Old Masters, and over his lifetime Vanderbilt acquired more than 200 paintings, which he housed in his lavish and palatial Fifth Avenue mansion.

== In popular culture ==
- A portrayal of Vanderbilt is featured in the History Channel's 2012 miniseries docudrama The Men Who Built America.

== See also ==
- List of richest Americans in history
