= James A. Burden House =

Building in Manhattan, New York

- U.S. National Register of Historic Places
- New York State Register of Historic Places
- New York City Landmark
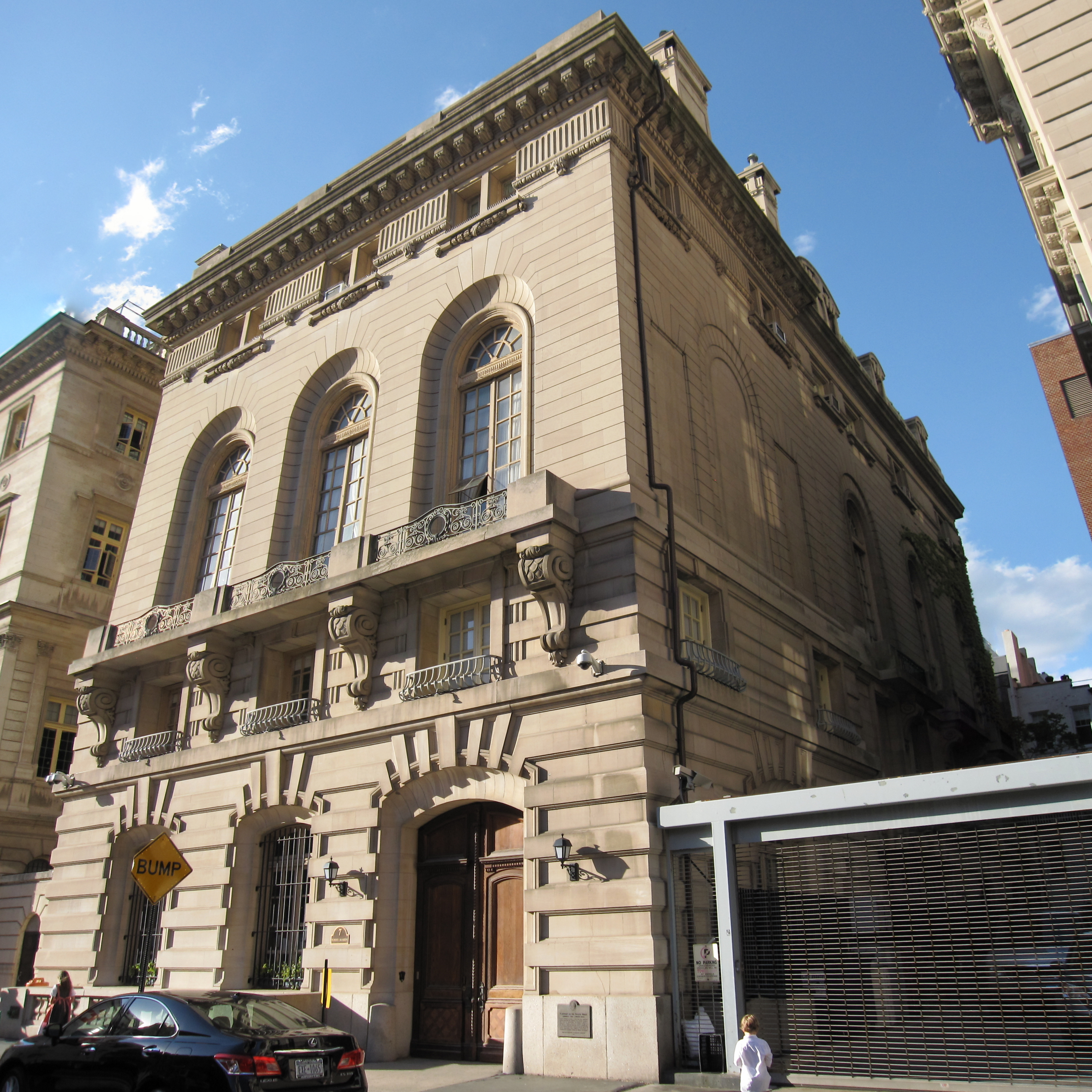
- Interactive map of James A. Burden House
- Location: 7 East 91st Street, Manhattan, New York, US
- Coordinates: 40°47′04.5″N 73°57′26″W
- Built: 1902–1905
- Architect: Warren and Wetmore
- NRHP reference No.: 06000821
- NYSRHP No.: 06101.000995
- NYCL No.: 0676

Significant dates
- Added to NRHP: September 12, 2006
- Designated NYSRHP: June 28, 2006
- Designated NYCL: February 19, 1974

The James A. Burden House is a mansion at 7 East 91st Street in the Carnegie Hill section of the Upper East Side of Manhattan in New York City, New York, US. The five-story mansion was designed by architects Warren and Wetmore in the Beaux-Arts style. It was completed in 1905 as the residence of iron entrepreneur James A. Burden Jr. and his wife Florence Sloane Burden. The Convent of the Sacred Heart, a private school, owns the Burden House along with the adjacent Otto H. Kahn House, which is internally connected. The mansion is a New York City designated landmark and, along with the Kahn House, is listed on the National Register of Historic Places.

The mansion's limestone facade is rusticated on its lowest two stories, with segmental archways and multiple entrances to the south and east. There is French-inspired detailing on the facade, especially around the double-height windows and balcony on the third story. The house has French-style interiors and is divided into front and rear sections, with an oval entrance hall connecting the floors. The first floor originally contained reception spaces while the second floor was devoted to living quarters. On the third story were spaces such as Burdens' ballroom, dining room, and reception hall; there were two additional stories above it.

Andrew Carnegie purchased the site in 1898 to protect the value of his nearby mansion. William D. Sloane, of the W. & J. Sloane furniture family, acquired the site from Carnegie in 1901 and commissioned the Burden House and the adjacent John Henry Hammond House for his daughters. The house served as the Burden family's home from 1905 to 1933. The contents of the house were auctioned by Parke-Bernet, and the Convent of the Sacred Heart purchased the mansion in 1940. The Convent used the house as a boarding school until 1966, then converted it into classrooms. The house was renovated in the late 20th century, though many of the interior spaces have been preserved.

== Site ==
The James A. Burden House is at 7 East 91st Street in the Carnegie Hill section of the Upper East Side of Manhattan in New York City, New York, US. It stands on the north side of 91st Street, just east of Fifth Avenue. The site has a frontage of 57.17 feet (17.43 m) wide on 91st Street and extends 100 feet (30 m) northward. On the same city block to the west is the Otto H. Kahn House (which is internally connected with the Burden House), while to the east are the John Henry Hammond House and the John and Caroline Trevor House. The Felix M. Warburg House, containing the Jewish Museum, is on the block to the north. Just south of the James A. Burden House is the Andrew Carnegie Mansion at 2 East 90th Street, housing the Cooper Hewitt, Smithsonian Design Museum. The townhouses on 11, 15, and 17 East 90th Street and the Spence School are located on the same block as the Carnegie Mansion, southeast of the Burden House.

Facing the Hammond House to the east is a courtyard, which was originally enclosed behind heavy doors. The courtyard occupies the 35-foot (11 m) gap between the Hammond and Burden houses. Ever since the government of the Soviet Union took over the Hammond House in the 1970s, the courtyard has served as a parking lot, which is closed off by a rolldown gate.

== Architecture ==
The mansion was designed by Warren and Wetmore in the Beaux-Arts style. The facade may have been designed with assistance from Lewis Henry Morgan (died 1901). The house is embellished by French-inspired detailing around the windows and balcony. Jayne Merkel wrote for Oculus in 1996 that the house resembled a "French Renaissance hotel". The house is rectangular in shape and is oriented north–south relative to the Manhattan street grid.

=== Facade ===
The Burden House is five stories high, with its fifth story set back from the facade. It is roughly divided into a more formal front section and a less formal service wing in the rear. The house is set back from both the Kahn House to the west and the Hammond House to the east, and, as such, has decorations on its western, eastern, and southern elevations of its facade. On the western elevation is an ornamental exterior stair. For the most part, there are few windows along the western elevation, while the northern elevation's windows are concentrated on its upper stories. There are various windows facing north, east, and west along the rear wing. The ornamentation is concentrated on the southern and eastern elevations.

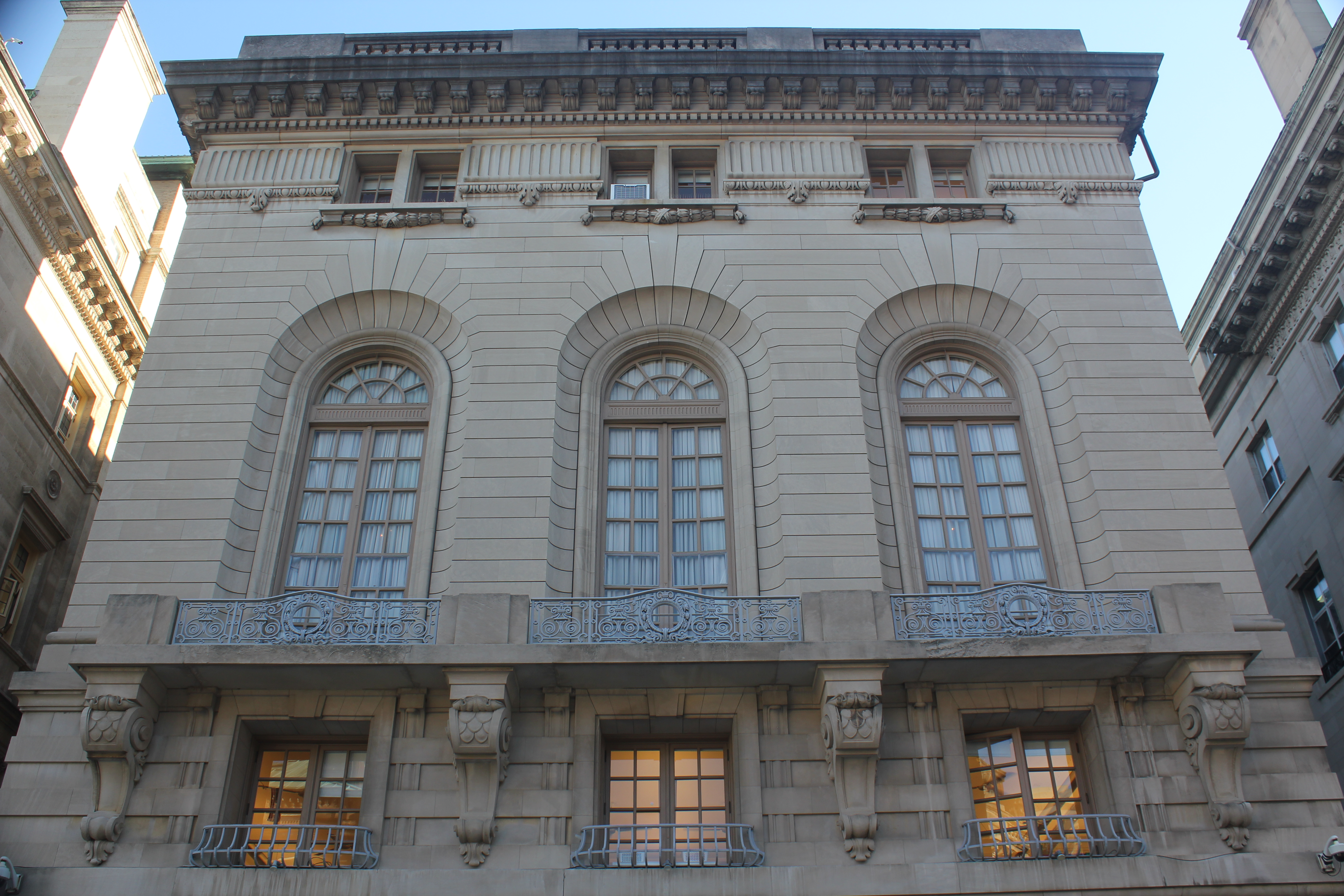
The second through fourth stories of the southern elevation

The facade of the first and second stories is made of rusticated blocks of granite. The segmentally-arched carriage entrance faces south toward 91st Street and is closed off by heavy wooden doors. Next to the 91st Street entrance are two segmentally arched windows; both the windows and the carriage entrance are topped by a limestone string course. The main entrance, on the eastern elevation, was made of glass and iron and was accessed by a covered driveway, which functioned as a porte-cochère. There was a small concierge's booth next to the driveway. A short stoop (now blocked off) ascends from the driveway to the doorways. There is a small pedestrian entrance to the left of the main entrance, as well as three segmentally arched windows on the eastern elevation.

The second story is treated like a mezzanine, with small rectangular windows. On the southern elevation, the second story has three square windows, which are flanked by console brackets that hold up the third-floor balcony. The brackets extend the whole height of the second floor, an intentional design choice that was meant to make the second floor appear as small as possible. At the second story, the western elevation has one square window, while the eastern elevation has two square windows in the front and four larger windows in the rear.

The third story of the facade is designed like a piano nobile, the main floor of a palazzo. On the southern elevation are three double-height, recessed openings with arched windows, as well as a balcony with iron and stone railing in front of the windows. The front portions of both the western and eastern elevations have double-height blind arches, flanked by rectangular blind openings, on the third floor. At the rear of the eastern elevation are additional double-height arched windows with their own balconies. All of these windows are multi-paned casement sash windows. On the fourth story is a fluted frieze interspersed with rectangular pairs of windows. There is a cornice with modillions above the fourth-story windows, as well as a balustrade above the cornice. On the roof are decorative chimneys placed behind a parapet. The fifth story is placed within a mansard roof and is set back from 91st Street, with dormer windows on the eastern elevation. The north end of the roof is a gable that stretches the house's entire width.

=== Features ===
The house has French-style interiors and is divided into front and rear sections. The front of the house was used as the Burden family's living space. At the rear of the house, used by the servants, were a service elevator and a staircase. A small elevator connected each story at the front of the house. The house is cited as having 35, 38, or 50 rooms. In addition to the five above-ground stories, there are two basement levels.

==== First story and entrance hall ====
There is a ground-story entrance hall with a grand spiraling staircase, around which most of the interior rooms are arranged. The entrance hall is oval in shape and was originally accessed by a narrow passageway from the courtyard. The entrance hall contains walls of Caen stone, while the grand staircase has marble treads and a wrought-iron balustrade. There were "balcony halls" extending off the entrance hall on the second and third stories, with recessed niches flanked by marble columns. On either wall of each niche are doors, covered entirely with 12-by-8-inch (300 mm × 200 mm) mirrors. On the ceiling of the oval stairway hall is a red, orange, and yellow mural of the arts, which was painted by the muralist Hector d'Espouy. The mural was still intact in the late 20th century, as were the marble floors, which were inlaid with red specks. The entrance hall formed part of a "promenade" that led from the original main entrance to the third-floor spaces.

When the Burdens lived in the house, the rest of the first floor contained the office of its owner James A. Burden Jr. (also known as the den) and some reception spaces. On the right side of the entrance hall, a small reception room with pastel-colored walls led to an Asian room (Note: Described in The New York Times as a "Chinese or Japanese room") on the first floor. The Asian room had ebony drawers set into the walls, as well as various East Asian bric-à-brac. On the left side of the entrance hall was James's office, which was clad with old English oak. The Convent of the Sacred Heart school, which took over the house in 1940, converted these spaces into ancillary spaces and classrooms while preserving many of the architectural details.

==== Upper stories ====
At the Burdens' request, Warren and Wetmore placed the living quarters on the second story. (Note: Kathrens 2005, p. 128, describes the physical second story as the "entresol" and the physical third story as the "second story". This article uses physical floor numbers.) This story contained an entresol with the Burdens' dining, living, and reception rooms were situated; it was used for entertaining family members and friends. One room was used as the boudoir, or sitting room, of James's wife Florence Sloane Burden, with grayish-white walls, white silk hangings, and medallion paintings. Adjacent to the boudoir was Florence's bedroom, which originally had gray-blue walls, satin tapestries, and wall-mounted steel engravings. Florence also had a square dressing room with a marble-clad bathroom. On the same floor were James's bedroom, which had green hangings; a tile-and-marble bathroom; and a walk-in closet that doubled as his dressing room. A stair led down from the bedroom to James's office. At the center of the house was a library room with French walnut furnishings, which could be accessed from the balcony hall. A small dining room on the same floor was painted in red and gold, with tapestries of the same color and inlaid marble sideboards. These rooms have since been converted into classrooms.

On the third story were spaces such as Burdens' ballroom, dining room, and reception hall, which were used for hosting large events. The ballroom was ornately decorated with tapestries. It is designed in the Louis XIV style, with paneled violet-gray marble walls and a decorative plaster ceiling. The ballroom still exists and is connected via a foyer to the reception hall, which can collectively seat 210 persons. Behind it was the reception hall, which had gilded decorations. The dining room had Campan vert marble walls with gilded trim, as well as a marble fireplace mantel with various carved motifs such as grapes and goats' heads. Adjacent to the dining room was the kitchen, which still exists. On the same story is the music room, which had gold-colored columns and a plaster coved ceiling. The music room, which one newspaper described as costing $60,000, had other decorative features such as tapestries, crystal chandeliers, paneled walls, and wooden floors in a herringbone pattern. The third floor also contained a salon and a tray hall, accessed by a niche. The third floor retains most of its original functions and decorations, and the spaces can be rented for events and film shoots.

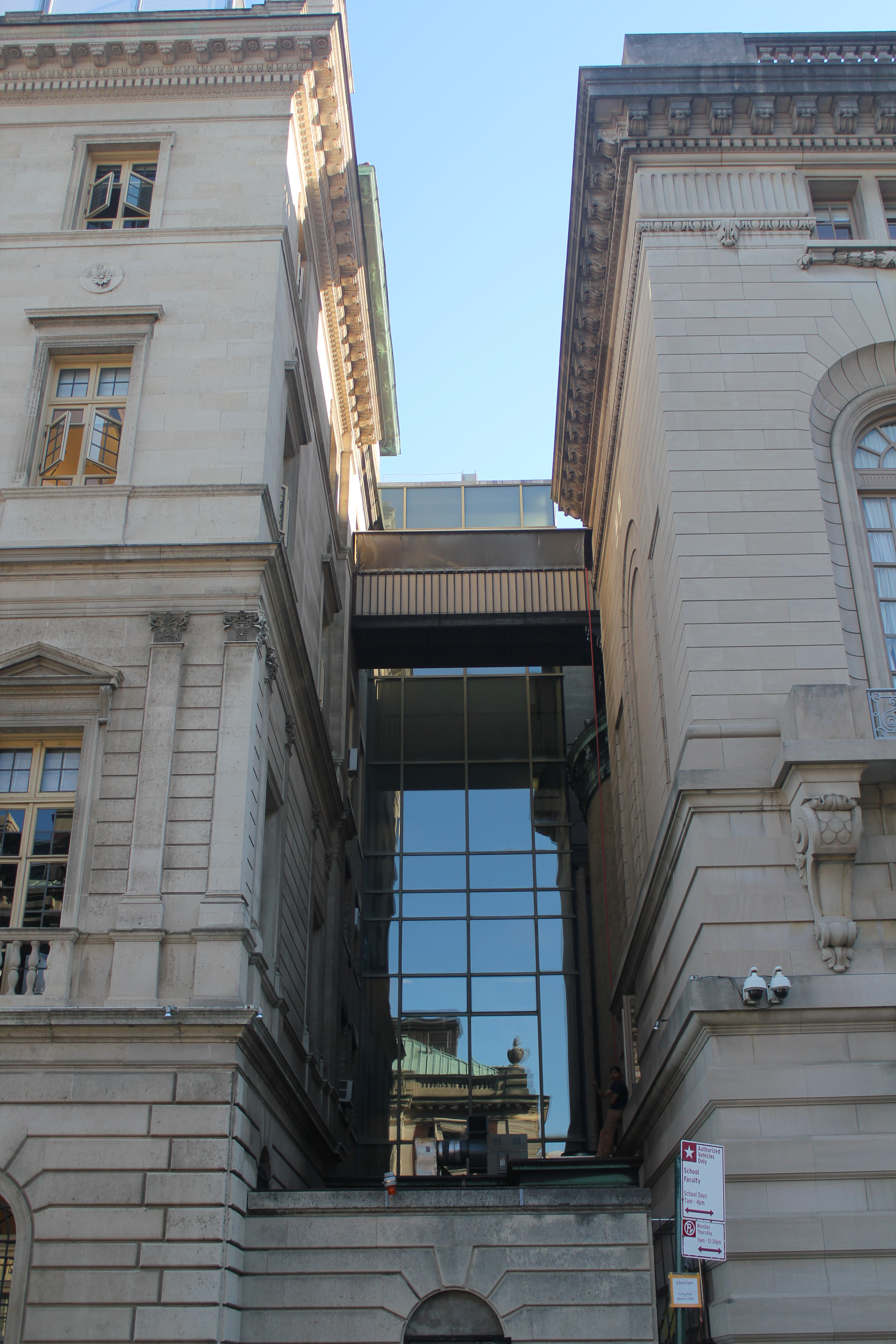
Connection with the Kahn House, constructed after the Convent of the Sacred Heart took over both houses

The fourth story included five bedrooms and a children's playroom, while the attic had an infirmary. There were also various closets and bathrooms on the fourth story. The first through third stories are connected to the Kahn House's rear rooms via a glass passageway that is set back from the street. Since the floor levels are uneven, the connection is slightly sloped. The top stories, originally used as bedrooms and living spaces, are used as the Convent of the Sacred Heart's offices and classrooms.

== History ==
In December 1898, the industrialist Andrew Carnegie bought all of the lots on Fifth Avenue between 90th and 92nd streets, with the intent of building his mansion on some of these plots. Carnegie ultimately decided to erect his mansion only on the plots between 90th and 91st streets. He retained ownership of several nearby lots to protect his home's value, selling them only to "congenial neighbors". Carnegie sold four land lots on 91st Street to the businessman William Douglas Sloane in December 1900. (Note: The National Park Service gives a different date of 1899.) The assemblage is approximately 135 feet (41 m) wide. (Note: Another source gives a figure of 136 feet (41 m).) Sloane intended to build two houses on the site, one for each of his daughters: Florence Sloane Burden, who was married to iron entrepreneur James A. Burden Jr., and Emily Sloane Hammond, who was married to John Henry Hammond. The Burden and Hammond residences were to be separated by a 35-foot-wide (11 m) courtyard. Sloane acquired further land on 91st Street in November 1901 as part of a land swap with Carnegie.

=== Development and Burden use ===
Soon after buying the lots, Sloane commissioned the architects Warren & Wetmore to design a house on the western end of the assemblage. The building would be a wedding present for Florence and James Burden, who had been living at 8 East 69th Street since 1897. Both the Sloane and the Burden families were among the country's wealthiest; James was an heir to the Burden Iron Works, while Florence was an heiress to the furniture company W. & J. Sloane through her father and to the Vanderbilt family through her mother. Warren & Wetmore filed plans for a five-story house at 7 East 91st Street in April 1902, at which point the building was planned to cost $250,000. Sloane was erecting both of his daughters' residences by the end of the year, when James Burden's uncle I. Townsend Burden bought a site on the same city block. The Building and Sanitary Inspection Company was hired as the drainage and plumbing contractor for both the Hammond and James Burden houses, and C. T. Wills was hired to construct the interior trim for the Burden House.

The house was completed in 1905, and the Burdens were recorded as having moved in by the last week of that December. The Burden family was hosting events at the house by early 1906. Early census figures for the Burden family are unavailable. A National Park Service report indicates that James, Florence, and their three young children may have had at least 10 servants living with them, while the author Michael Kathrens cited a figure of 27 servants. When Carnegie tried to split the adjacent parcel at 91st Street and Fifth Avenue and sell part of it to Lloyd Bryce in 1906, Sloane and his daughters all opposed the sale. Had Bryce's house been built, it would have abutted the Burden House's western wall, violating a restriction that required that any building on that site be set back from the Burden House's western facade. The Sloanes filed a lawsuit which prevented Carnegie from selling that plot to anyone.

The 1910 United States census recorded the five members of the Burden family as living with 17 servants. The Sloanes dropped their suit against Carnegie in 1914, when the lot at the corner with Fifth Avenue was sold to Otto Hermann Kahn, who sold a 26-inch-wide (66 cm) strip of land on the eastern side of his lot to the Burdens. During the 1910s and 1920s, the Burdens hosted several events at their house, such as musical dinners, as well as debutante receptions for their daughter Florence "Sheila" Burden and their niece Emily Hammond. Their guests included the author Mark Twain and the composer Giacomo Puccini. After the family's Colonial-style summer home in Syosset, New York (known as Woodside), was finished in 1918, the Burdens stayed at the Long Island estate during the summer. The Burdens retained the 91st Street house through the 1920s and early 1930s. They bought an apartment at River House in 1931, and James Burden died the following year. Florence Burden, who would live until 1960, moved out and married Richard M. Tobin after James's death.

=== Astor use ===
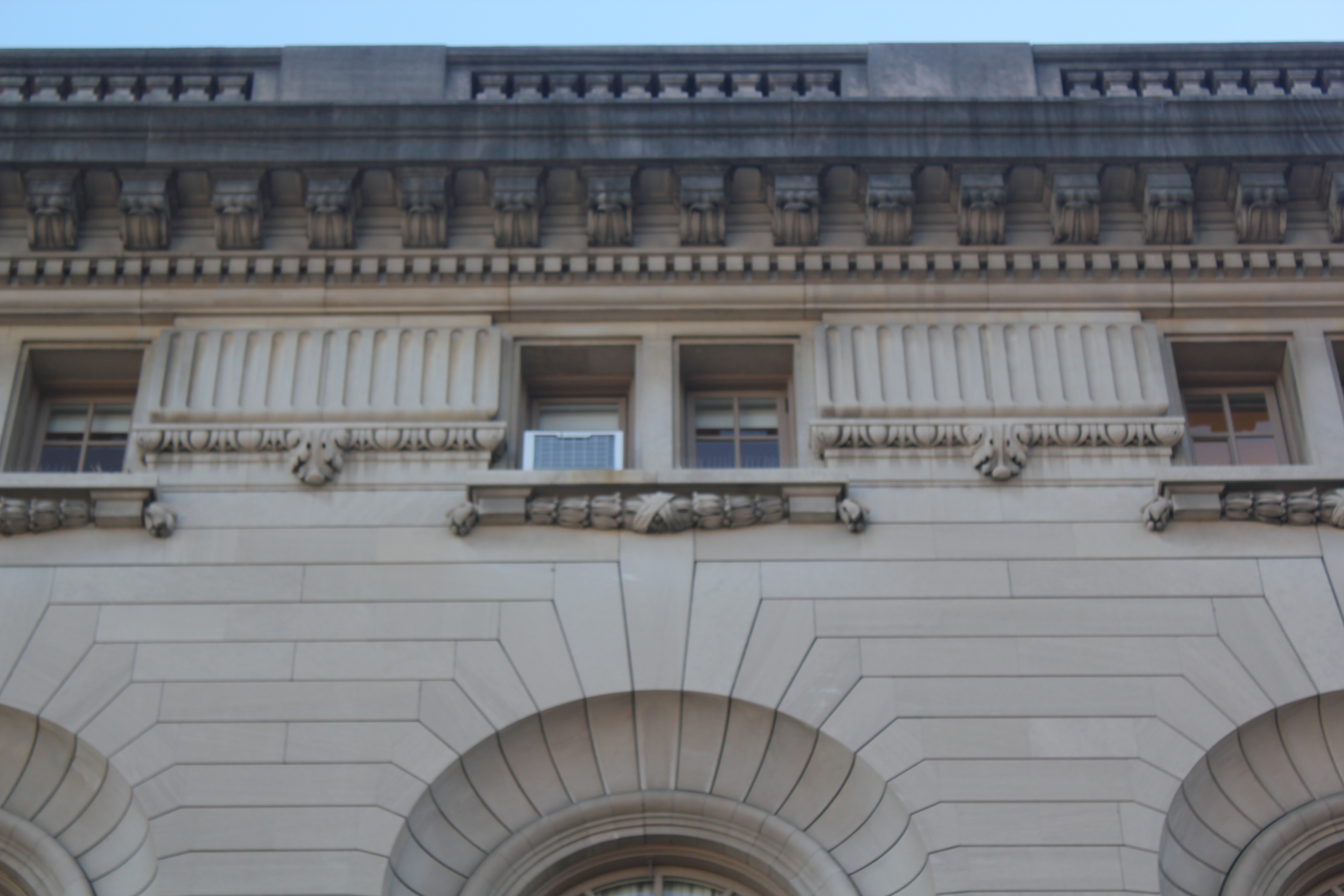
Upper-story windows

Originally, the Burden House and several other houses along the block were restricted to residential use because of a covenant placed by Andrew Carnegie. When Kahn died in 1934, Kahn's estate sought to sell their house to the Convent of the Sacred Heart, a private girls' school, and the restriction was lifted. Meanwhile, John Jacob Astor VI leased the Burden House in December 1933 after his engagement to Eileen Sherman Gillespie. Astor had intended to live in the home with Gillespie, but they broke off their engagement, and Astor retained the house when he was engaged to Ellen Tuck French in 1934. Following their marriage later that year, Astor and French moved into the house in November 1934, and they hosted their first major society event there, a supper dance, in December 1935. A Daily News article on the dance called the house's ballroom "one of the few private ballrooms still in existence".

Astor and French lived at the house with their son, William Backhouse Astor III (born 1935). In April 1938, at the request of Florence Burden, the contents of the house were auctioned by Parke-Bernet. The auction included Belgian tapestries, carpets, and French busts, in addition to paintings such as a portrait of the Marquess of Normanby. The house also contained various pieces of English, French, and Italian furniture, including a carved walnut table, Chippendale chairs and sofa, wooden urns, a foldable five-paneled screen, and six Louis XVI-style armchairs. The sale netted $31,591 (equivalent to $730,794 in 2025). By 1939, Astor and French seldom stayed at the 91st Street house when they visited New York City, instead frequenting the St. Regis New York, owned by Astor's half-brother Vincent Astor.

=== Use as school ===
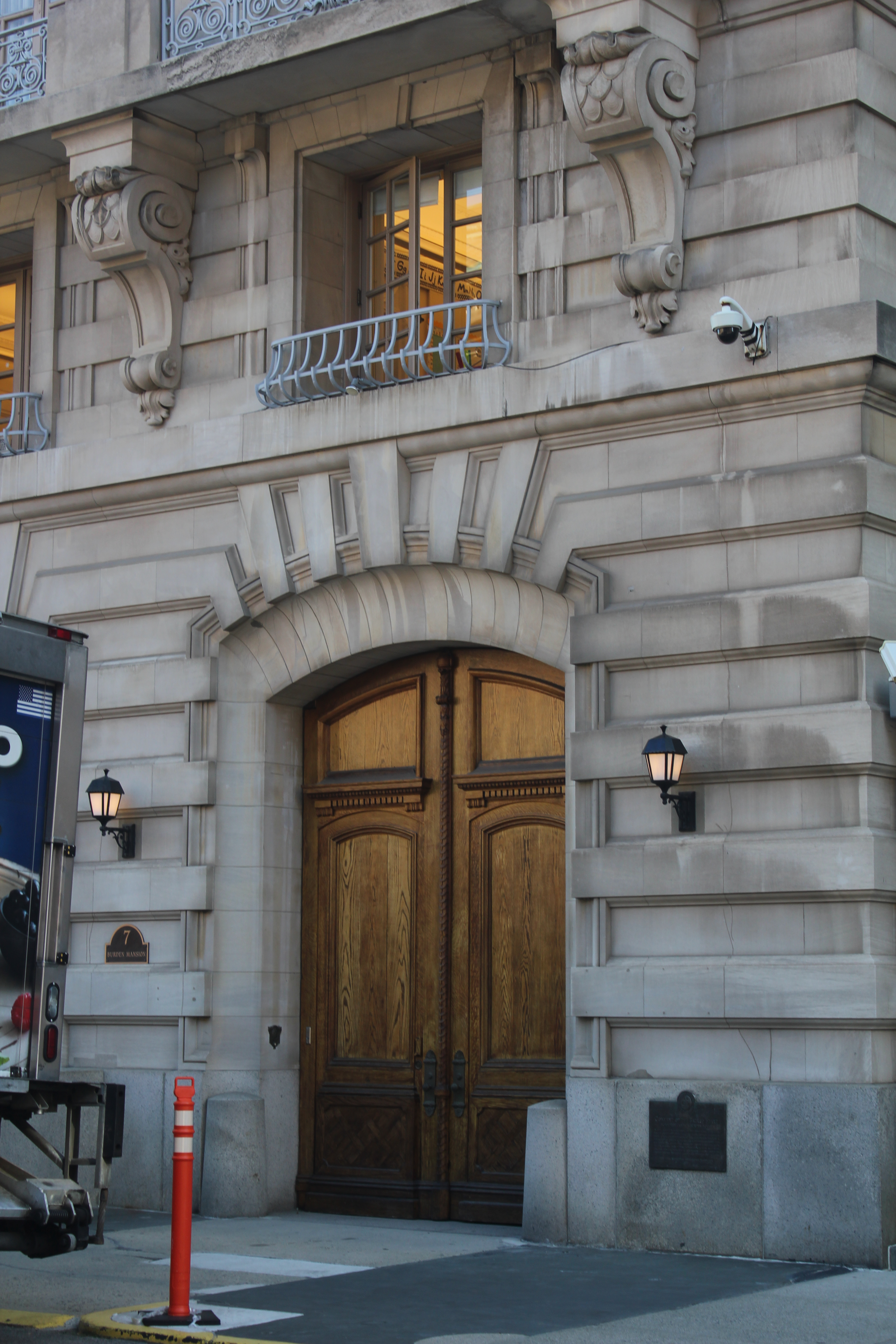
View of the entrance

The Convent of the Sacred Heart purchased the mansion in June 1940. The sale was one of the costliest residential purchases on the Upper East Side during 1940; at the time, the house was valued at $250,000, while the site was valued at $130,000. A connection was built between the Burden and Kahn houses. The former Burden House was initially used as the Duchesne Residential School, a boarding school named after Rose Philippine Duchesne. When it served as the Duchesne Residence School, the building hosted events such as parties and fundraising benefits. By the late 1960s, the school's nuns lived on the fifth floor of the house. The Duchesne Residence School stopped using the Burden House after 1966, and, after Sacred Heart sought to raise $90,000 for an expansion of the school the same year, students' parents donated $150,000. Following this, the school's nuns realized that they needed another $275,000 to convert 7 East 91st Street into a middle school.

In 1969, Sacred Heart bought four adjacent townhouses along 92nd Street, and it considered demolishing these townhouses and the Burden House for an expansion of the school. The New York City Landmarks Preservation Commission (LPC) consequently designated the Burden and Kahn houses as landmarks. In 1973, the Convent sold its portion of the courtyard east of the house to the government of the Soviet Union, which had bought the Hammond House for use as a consulate, for $100,000. The Soviet Union closed off the courtyard and demolished the fountain inside. One reporter wrote that "a veritable 'Berlin Wall' separates the mansions once owned by the Sloane sisters", the Burden and Hammond houses.

During the 1970s, the Burden and Kahn houses began hosting regular chamber music performances. After a Sacred Heart alumna requested permission to host her wedding at the Burden House in 1973, Sacred Heart began renting out both houses' ballrooms and the Kahn House's courtyard for weddings outside of school hours. The houses also hosted seminars, parties, photo shoots, and benefit parties, as well as events like consultant meetings. The 92nd Street townhouses adjoining the Burden House were sold in 1978.

The architecture firm of Buttrick White & Burtis was hired in the early 1980s to add a gymnasium, laboratories, and classroom space in the Burden and Kahn houses. The project, which was estimated to cost $1.5 million, was funded in part from revenue generated by the Burden House's ballroom, as well as from events such as tours and Christmas tree sales. The Convent of the Sacred Heart cleaned and repaired the facade for $250,000 in the 1990s, as the facade had been darkened by soot over the years. The school also repaired the ironwork and masonry on the facade. By the 2000s, the Burden House was known as the Convent of the Sacred Heart's Duchesne Residence School. The house contains Convent of the Sacred Heart's lower school.

== Impact ==
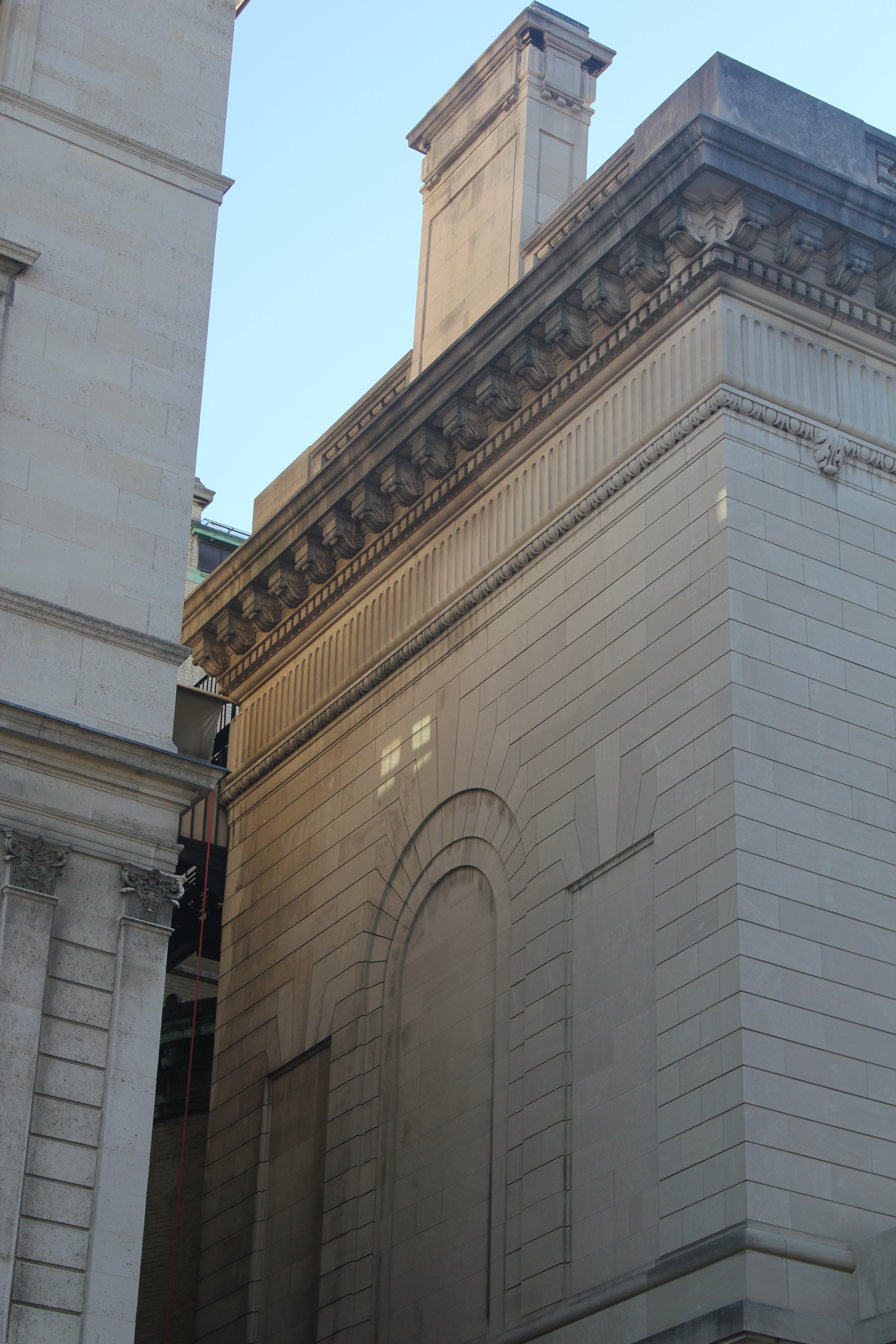
Blind arch on the western elevation

When the Burden, Hammond, and Carnegie houses were developed, a critic in the Real Estate Record wrote that "Their influence on the value of surrounding land is such that it is impossible to erect any but superior buildings in the neighborhood on account of the high price of land." In 1907, the New York Times wrote: "so perfectly is the French idea carried out at the Burden residence ... the only way one can enter is through a courtyard."

Architectural critic Henry Hope Reed Jr. wrote in 1961 that the Kahn, Burden, and Hammond houses were "the crown jewel of the block". A critic for The New York Times described the Kahn and Burden houses in 1972 as having "what may be the most lordly rooms any New York schoolchild studies in". Jayne Merkel wrote in 1996 that the Kahn and Burden houses "give the school a uniqueness and elegance that money cannot easily buy", while the historian Christopher Gray wrote in 2014 that the houses helped form one of the "grandest blocks" in the city. In addition, the 2009 film Duplicity was filmed inside the house.

The LPC first proposed the Carnegie Hill Historic District in 1966, which would have included both the Kahn and Burden houses. The LPC began considering the buildings as individual city landmarks in 1967, but the Convent of the Sacred Heart opposed the designations until the New York Landmarks Conservancy provided a loan to preserve the two buildings. The LPC designated the Kahn and Burden mansions as individual landmarks in February 1974, but the houses were not initially among the properties listed as part of the Carnegie Hill Historic District, which was designated the same year. When the Carnegie Hill Historic District was expanded in 1993, both structures were included in the expanded district. The Kahn and Burden mansions were collectively added to the New York State Register of Historic Places on June 28, 2006, and to the National Register of Historic Places on September 12, 2006.

== See also ==
- List of New York City Designated Landmarks in Manhattan from 59th to 110th Streets
- National Register of Historic Places listings in Manhattan from 59th to 110th Streets
