= C. P. H. Gilbert =

American architect (1861–1952)

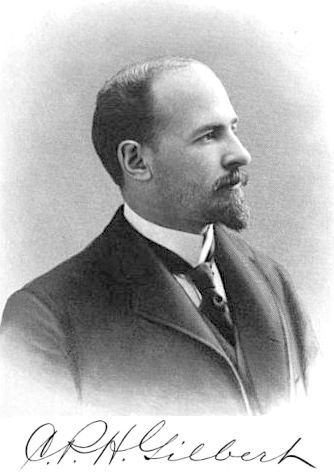
- Gilbert c. 1900
- Born: Charles Pierrepont Henry Gilbert; August 29, 1861; New York City, U.S.
- Died: November 25, 1952 (aged 91); Pelham Manor, New York, U.S.
- Occupation: Architect
- Buildings: Harry F. Sinclair House; Joseph Raphael De Lamar House; Morton F. Plant House; Felix M. Warburg House; Otto H. Kahn House

Charles Pierrepont Henry Gilbert (August 29, 1861 – October 25, 1952) was an American architect of the late-19th and early-20th centuries best known for designing townhouses and mansions.

== Ancestry and early life ==
Born in New York City, Gilbert was a descendant of English and New England ancestors. One of these was Sir Humphrey Gilbert (c. 1539 – September 9, 1583), to whom Queen Elizabeth I of England granted a patent for the colonization of North America. Sir Humphrey's ambitious plans ended when he was lost at sea with most of his company on their return voyage from the exploration of Newfoundland. Other members of the family, however, soon planted the name in North America.

C. P. H. Gilbert's father was Loring Gilbert, a direct descendant of John Gilbert, the second son of Giles Gilbert of Bridgwater, Somerset, England, who came to America early in the 17th century and settled at Dorchester, near Boston, and died at Taunton, Massachusetts, in 1654. Loring Gilbert was a leading commission merchant who had a successful career. He married Caroline C. Etchebery, and they had one son, Charles Pierrepont Henry Gilbert. Loring Gilbert died in 1893.

C. P. H. Gilbert received a careful education, studying both in America and in Europe, including at the École des Beaux-Arts in Paris. After being prepared for college he took courses in civil engineering and architecture, and later studied painting, sculpture, and the fine arts in general. After college, he began practical work as an assistant in the office of a prominent firm of architects, where he received the training necessary to prepare him for engaging in his own business. As a young man he designed buildings in the mining towns of Colorado and Arizona before returning to New York around 1885.

== Career ==
In 1886, at the age of twenty-five, Gilbert began practicing as an architect in New York City, and received commission to design buildings of all kinds. One of his first projects was the design of fourteen brownstone rowhouses that now form a part of the Manhattan Avenue Historic District. Gilbert designed the block for Hoboken developer John Brown in 1886.

Another noteworthy building was the 1888 Richardsonian Romanesque mansion at Eighth Avenue and Carroll Street in Park Slope, Brooklyn for Thomas Adams Jr., a chewing gum magnate. From 1893 on, Gilbert had a very large business, which grew steadily. In addition, he was a director or a stockholder in a number of large manufacturing companies outside of New York.

He saw action during the Spanish–American War of 1898. After the war he returned to New York.

By 1900 Gilbert had acquired a reputation as a specialist in designing opulent townhouses and mansions. Among his Fifth Avenue palazzi is the 1905 Neo-Renaissance mansion of Morton Freeman Plant, son of railroad tycoon Henry B. Plant. Through the 1920s he designed more than 100 New York City mansions in various styles; several of them along Fifth Avenue have now been re-purposed for institutional use. In education, client list and architectural style, Gilbert largely followed in the footsteps of Richard Morris Hunt, whose petit château on Fifth Avenue for William Kissam Vanderbilt set a model for French Late Gothic limestone châteaux to house the elite of the Gilded Age. Amongst Gilbert's clients were wealthy and influential industrialists and bankers such as Harry F. Sinclair, Joseph Raphael De Lamar, Felix M. Warburg, Otto H. Kahn, Adolph Lewisohn, Augustus G. Paine Jr. and families such as the Baches, Reids, Wertheims, Sloanes and other. Gilbert also designed a number of mansions and buildings on Long Island and in upstate New York in the 1920s.

Gilbert retreated from public life, and by the late 1920s stopped designing new houses. He retired to Pelham Manor, New York in Westchester County, where he died on October 25, 1952, at his home on 216 Townsend Avenue, at the age of 92. He is interred at Woodlawn Cemetery in The Bronx, New York City.

== Memberships ==
Gilbert was a member of numerous professional and social organizations, amongst them the Chamber of Commerce of the State of New York, the Architectural League, the Society of Colonial Wars, the General Society of the Sons of the Revolution, the New England Society, and the Fine Arts, Metropolitan, Union League, Lawyers', Riding, Racquet, Ardsley, Colonial, Country, and Nassau Country clubs of New York. He also was a Fellow of the American Institute of Architects, and a veteran of Squadron A, the cavalry organization of the New York National Guard.

== Family ==
Gilbert was married to Florence Cecil Moss, daughter of Theodore Moss of New York City, and had two children: Dudley Pierrepont Gilbert and Vera Pierrepont Gilbert. He lived at 33 Riverside Drive and had a villa in Newport, Rhode Island at Ochre Point.

== Works ==
Gilbert's works include:

- 1881 – Jules S. Bache residence, 10 East 67th Street, remodeled in 1889.
- 1886 – Fourteen brownstowne rowhouses in the Manhattan Avenue Historic District: 120-40 Manhattan Avenue, 39–43 West 105th Street, 38–44 West 106th Street
- 1888–1904 – at least eight of the Montgomery Place mansions (#11, 14, 16–19, 21, 25, 36–50, 54–60), between 8th Avenue and Prospect Park, Brooklyn
- c. 1889 – 313 and 315 Garfield Place, Brooklyn. Contrasting speculative houses.
- c. 1890 – Joseph Hanan residence, Carroll Street and 8th Avenue, Park Slope, Brooklyn; demolished in the 1930s
- c. 1895 – three adjoining mansions at the foot of Riverside Drive: 311 West 72nd Street, 1 Riverside Drive and 3 Riverside Drive for Philip Kleeberg
- 1898 – Harry F. Sinclair House, 79th Street and Fifth Avenue, now housing the Ukrainian Institute
- 1898 – Cushman Building, Broadway and Maiden Lane, 1898 (previously the site of the Howard Hotel)
- 1900 – "Meudon", the massive 80-room Louis XVI-style revival Gold Coast estate of William Dameron Guthrie in Lattingtown
- c. 1900 – Franklin Winfield Woolworth mansion, 80th Street and Fifth Avenue; demolished
- c. 1900 – Edmund C. Converse residence, 3 East 78th Street, in a "suave neo-Gothic", according to Christopher Gray; Converse was the first president of the Bankers Trust Company; his Greenwich, Connecticut estate is now known as Conyers Farm
- 1901 – Henry Seligman residence, 30 West 56th Street, now Aeffe USA
- 1903 – 57 Stone Street, built in the Dutch Colonial Revival style for Amos F. Eno, a son of Amos R. Eno
- 1904 – The Knabe Building, 437 Fifth Avenue
- 1905 – Joseph Raphael De Lamar House, Madison Avenue and 37th Street, now the Polish Consulate General
- 1905 – Edward Holbrook House, 4 East 52nd Street, now the Cartier Building
- 1906–1908 – Felix M. Warburg House, 92nd Street and Fifth Avenue, now the Jewish Museum
- 1913–1914 – Charlcôte House in Flat Rock Camp, constructed for Charlotte M. Bedell Paine; demolished 1980s
- 1914–1916 – Weckesser Hall, Wilkes University, Wilkes-Barre, Pennsylvania
- 1915–1918 – Mrs. Seymour H. Knox House, 800 Delaware Avenue (formerly 806), Buffalo, New York, now the offices of Cellino Law
- 1916–1918 – Otto H. Kahn House, 91st Street and Fifth Avenue, with architect J. Armstrong Stenhouse, now the Convent of the Sacred Heart
- 1917 – Adolph Lewisohn residence, 9 West 57th Street, demolished
- 1917 – 1067 Fifth Avenue, near 87th Street, apartment design in the French Gothic style
- 1917–1918 – Augustus G. Paine Jr. residence, 31 East 69th Street, now Austrian Consulate General
- 1919–1921 – Arthur and Alice Sachs residence, 42 East 69th Street, now Jewish National Fund
- 1921 – Essex County National Bank, Willsboro (founded in 1923 by Augustus G. Paine Jr., today part of Champlain National Bank)
- 1924–1925 – Seymour H. Knox II House, Buffalo, New York
- 1929–1930 – Paine Memorial Library, Willsboro
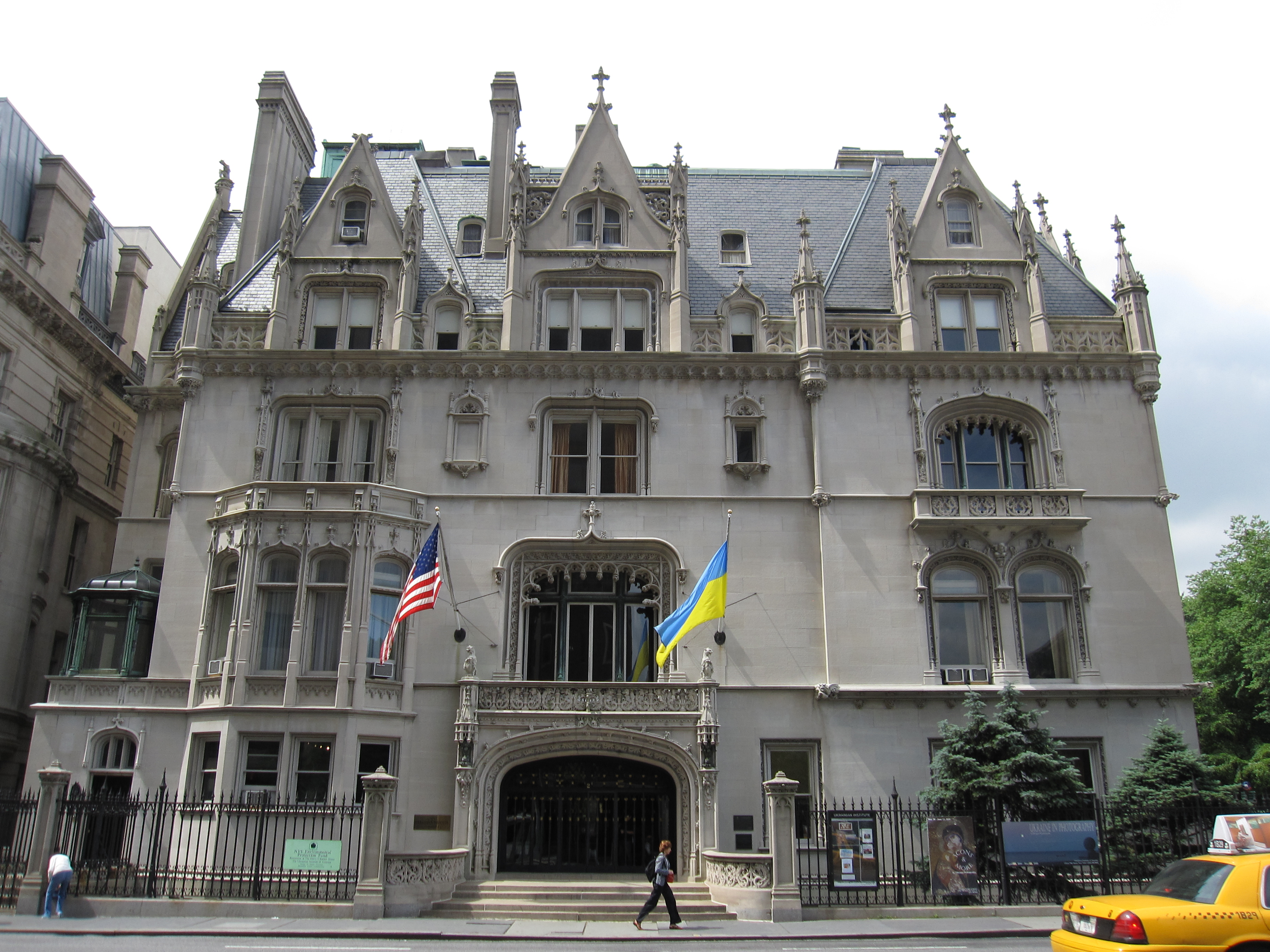
Harry F. Sinclair House on Fifth Avenue, as seen from 79th Street, now the Ukrainian Institute (1898)

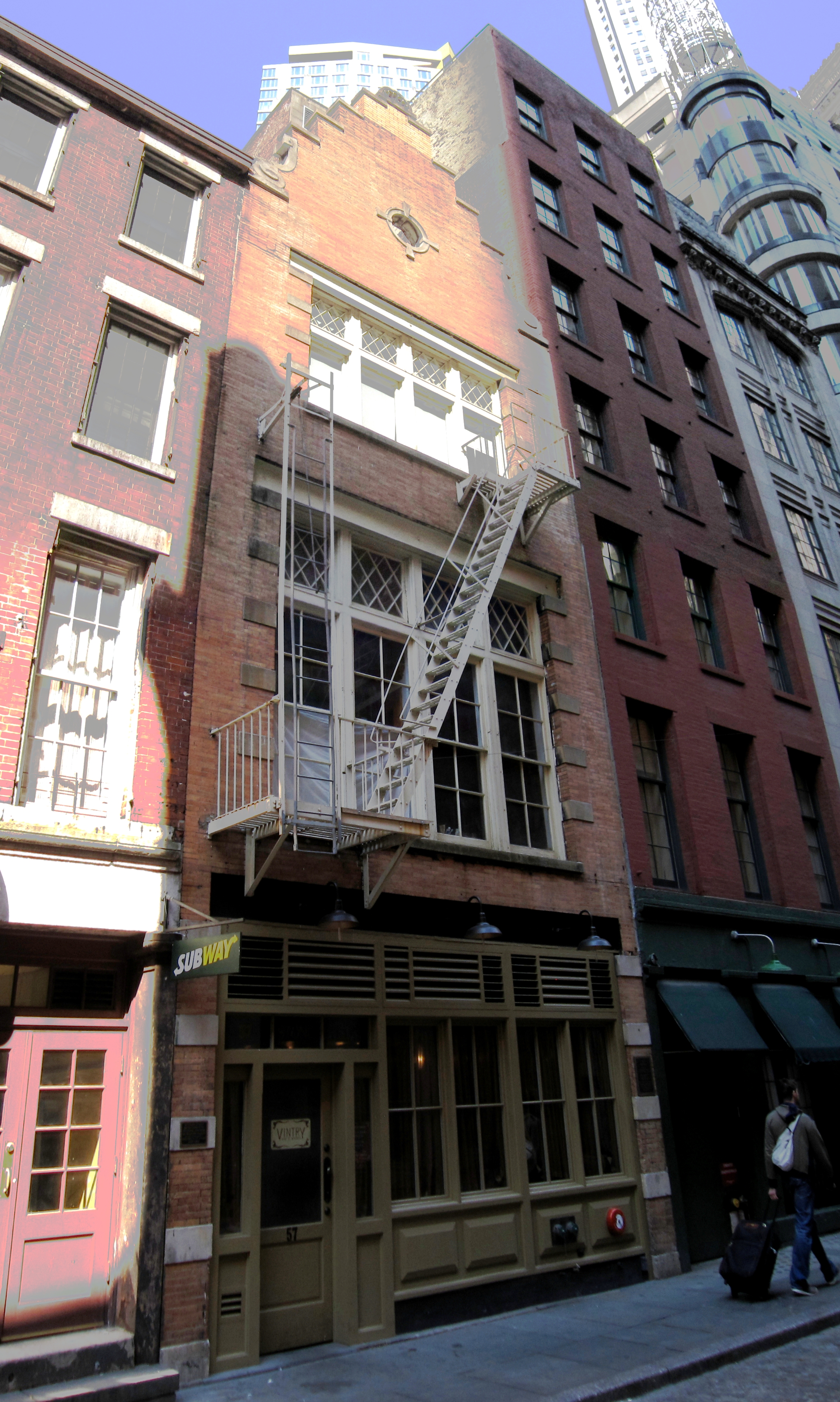
57 Stone Street, constructed for Amos F. Eno (1903)

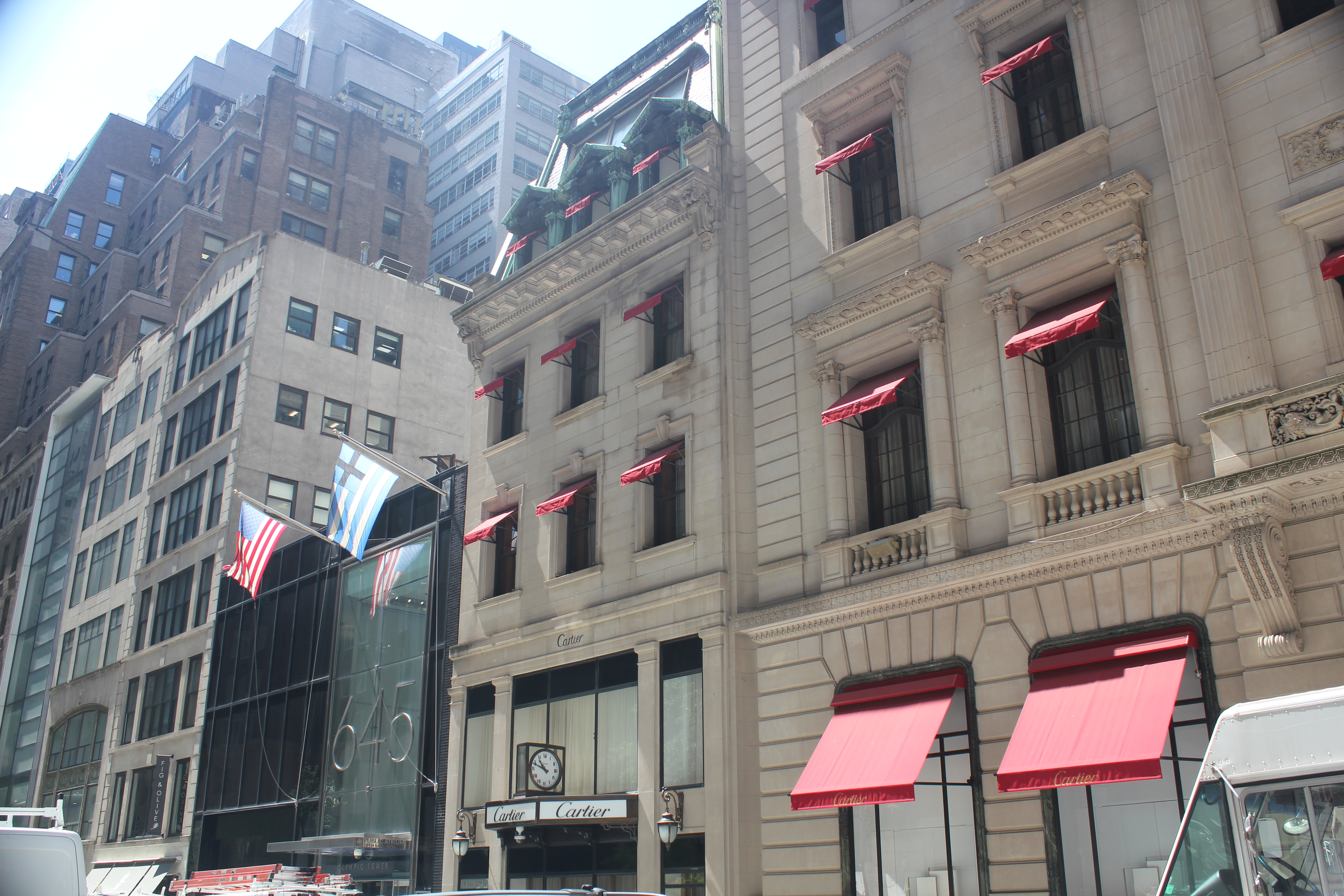
Edward Holbrook House, 4 East 52nd Street, now Cartier (1905)

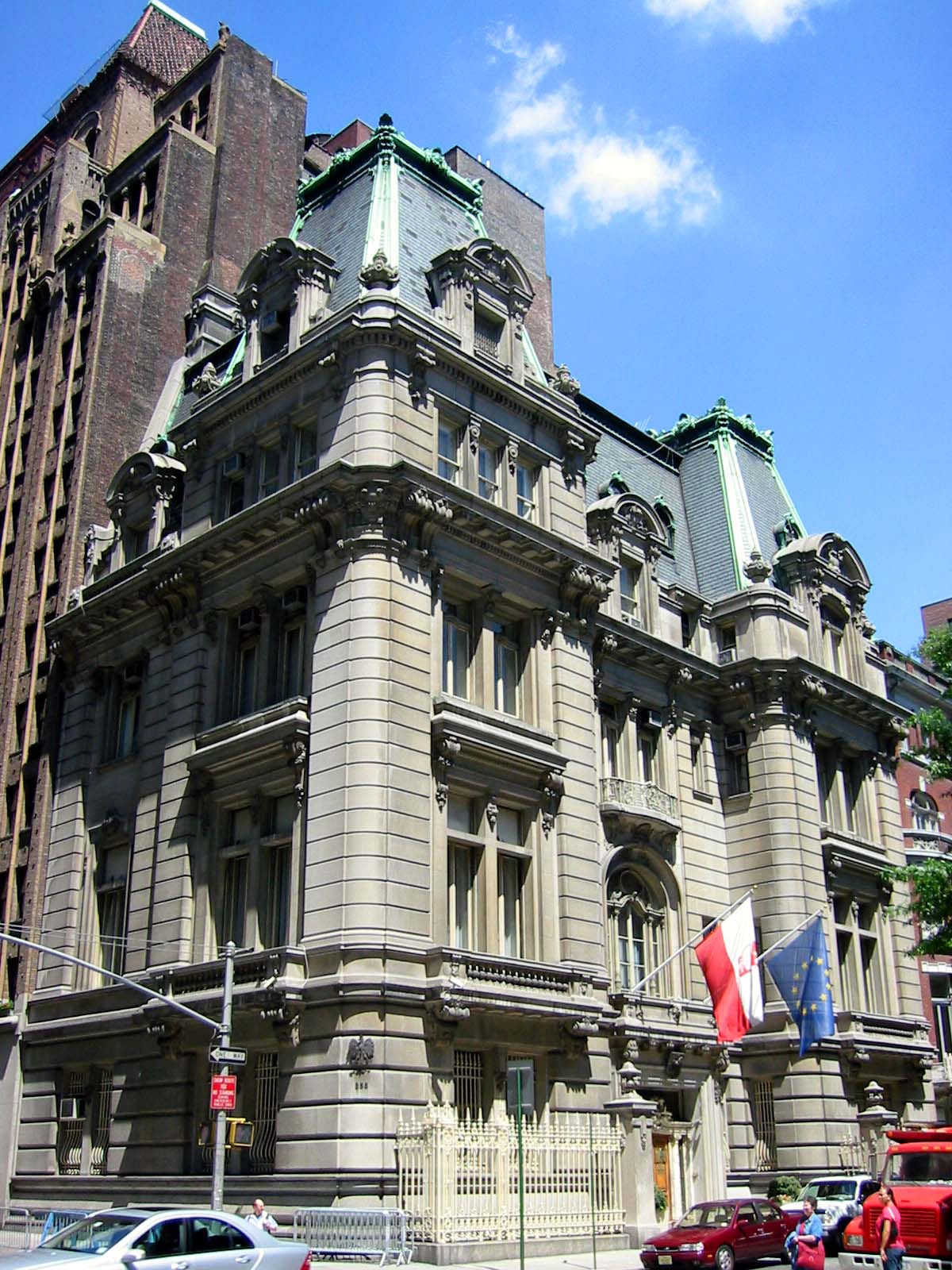
Joseph Raphael De Lamar House, Madison Avenue and 37th Street, now the Polish Consulate General (1905)

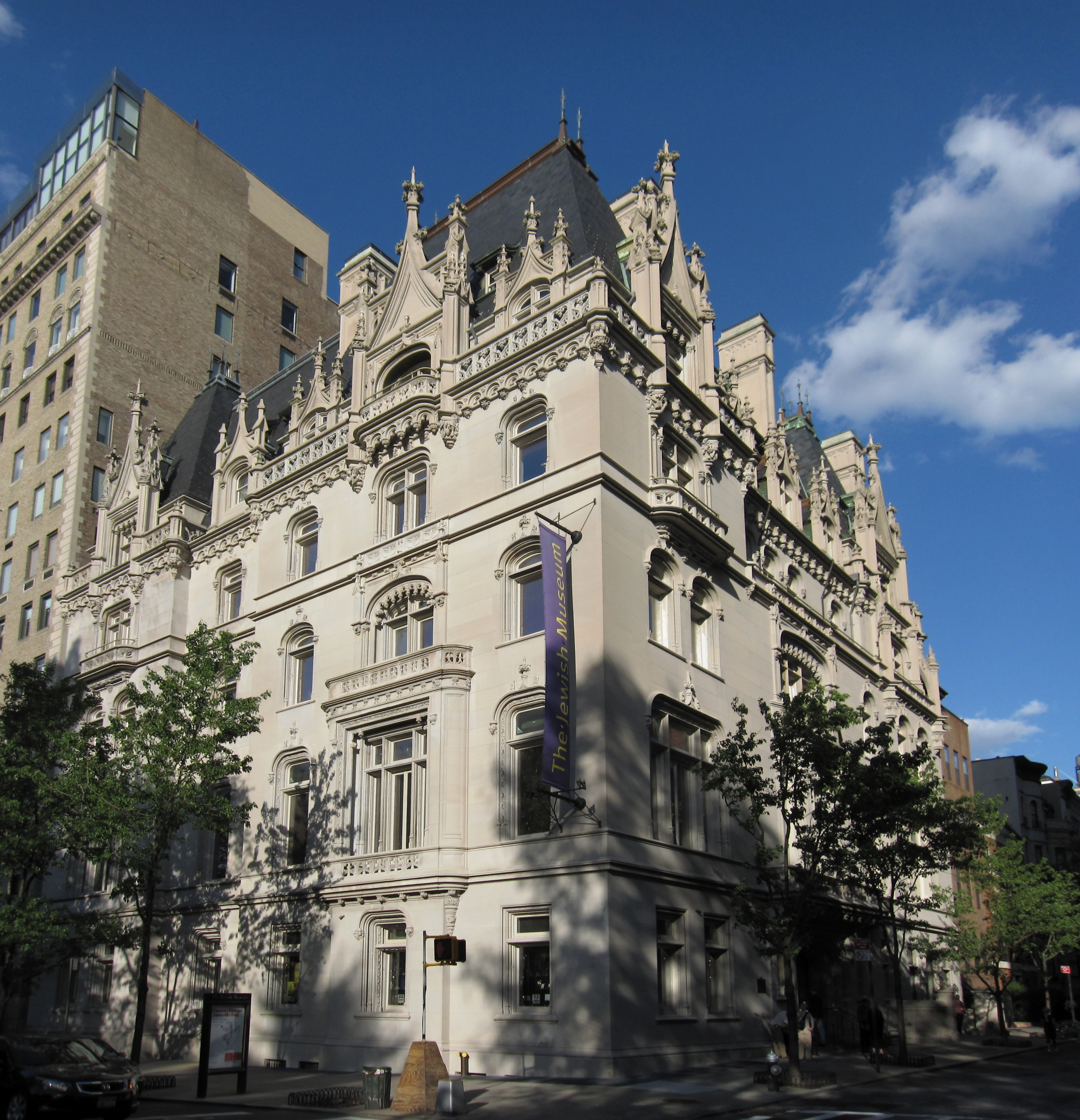
Felix M. Warburg House, 92nd Street and Fifth Avenue, now the Jewish Museum (1906–08)

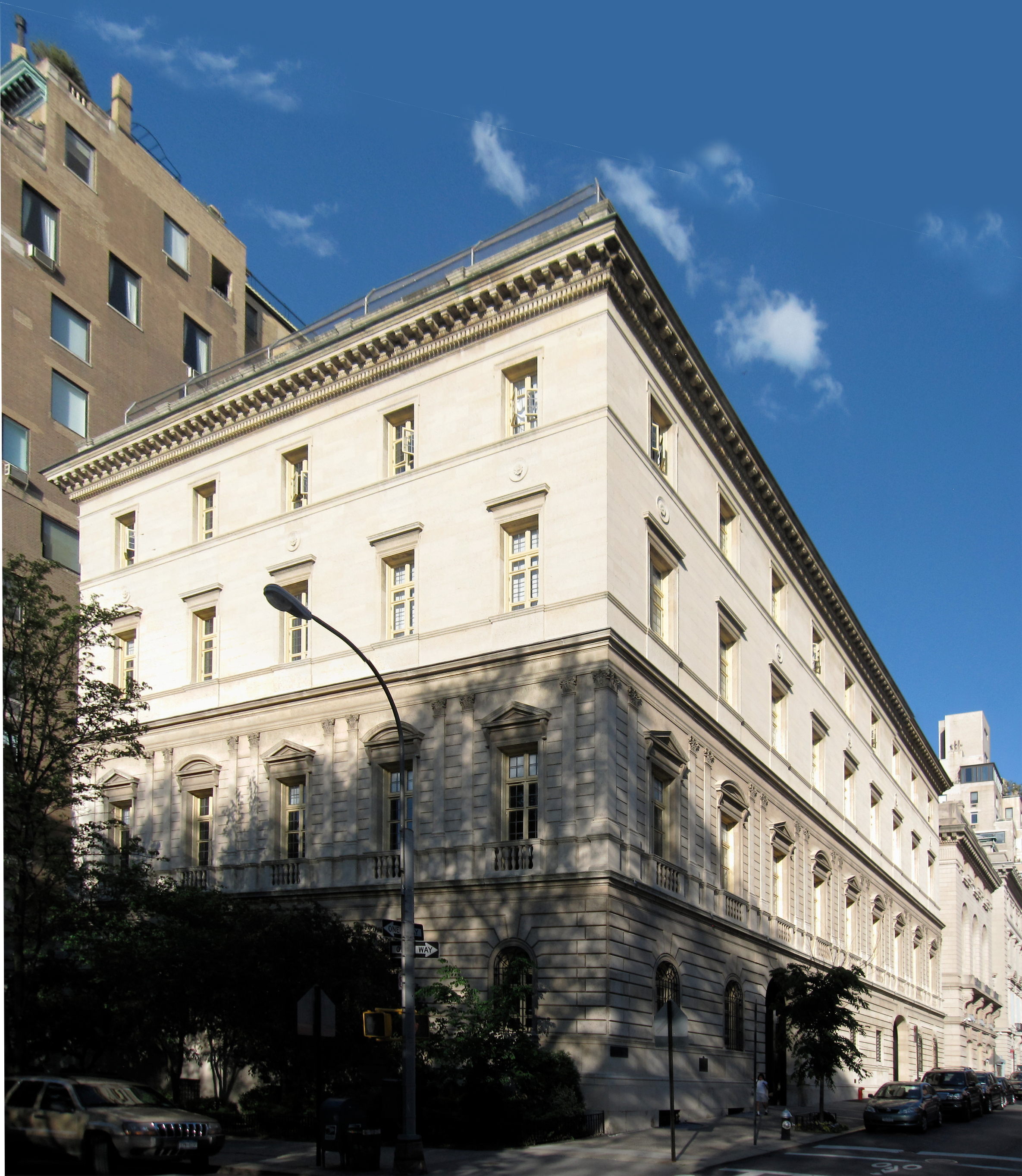
Otto H. Kahn House, 91st Street and Fifth Avenue, now the Convent of the Sacred Heart (1916–1918)

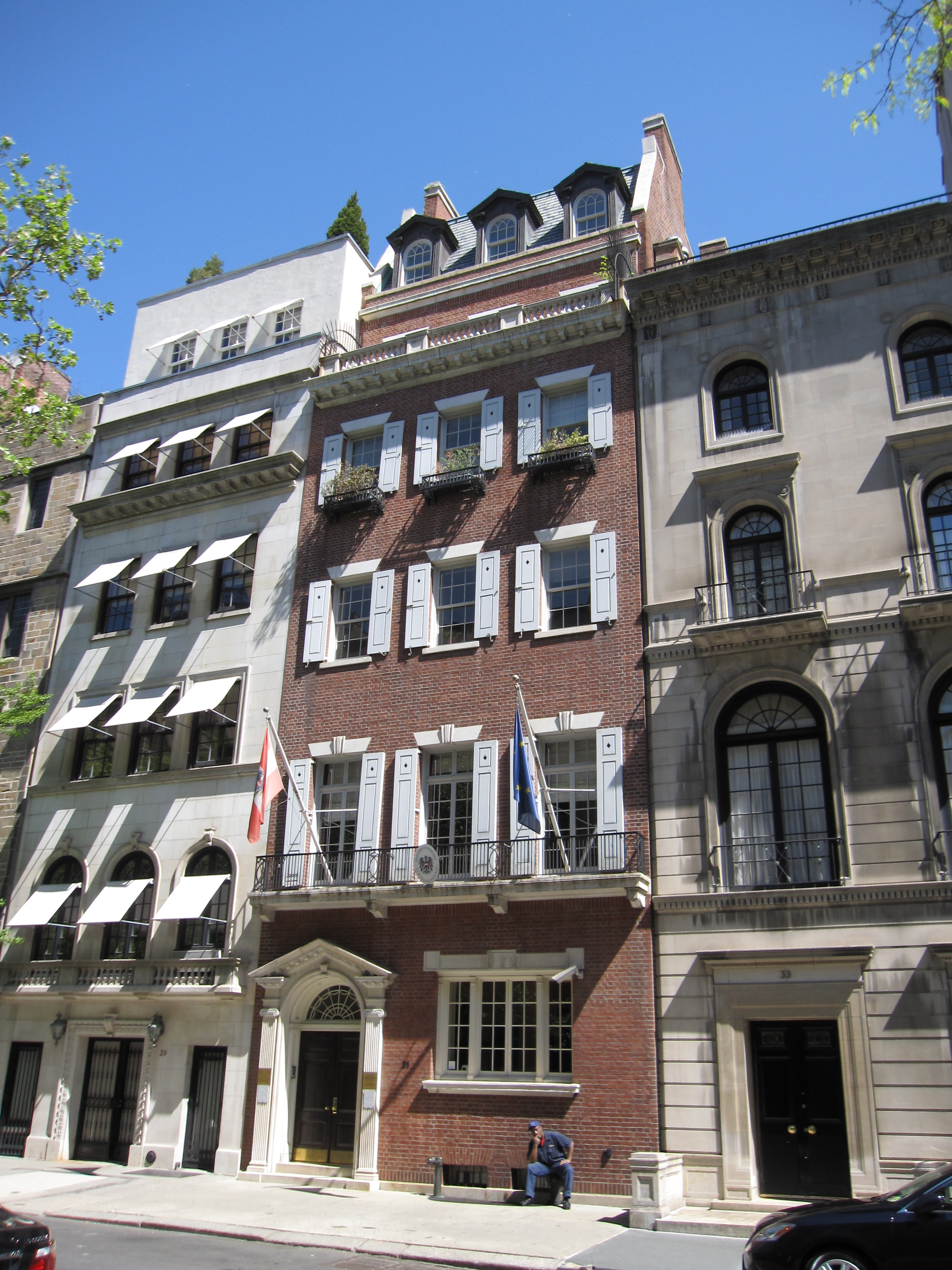
Residence of Augustus G. Paine Jr., 31 East 69th Street, now the Austrian Consulate General (1917–18)

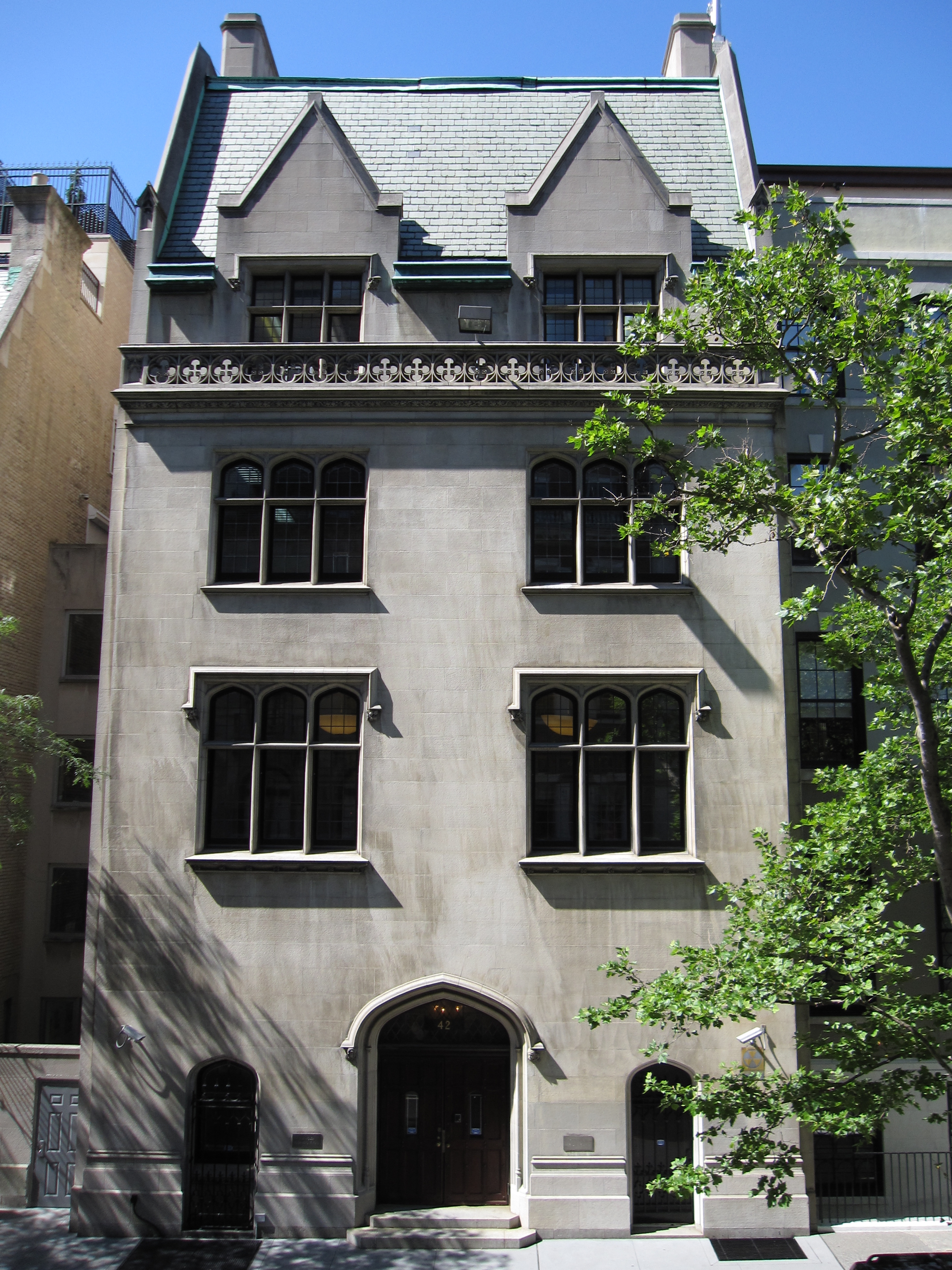
Residence of Arthur and Alice Sachs, 42 East 69th Street, now the Jewish National Fund (1919–21)
