= Alix Smith =

American photographer (born 1978)

Alix Smith (born in 1978 in New York City) is an American photographer. Her projects include Constructed Identities, Arranged Appearances, Through Imitation and States of Union. Smith grew up in New York City and attended the Convent of the Sacred Heart and the Dwight School. She lives and works in New York City.

Her photographs have been exhibited in the U.S. and Europe. She received a Master of Fine Arts in photography and related media from the School of Visual Arts in 2005. In the same year, she was selected by ArtReview magazine as one of the best emerging photographers internationally. In September 2004, she was chosen for the Art + Commerce Festival of Emerging Photographers. In 2005, she received a Marie Walsh Sharpe Studio Grant. In 2009 she received fiscal sponsorship from the New York Foundation for the Arts.
