= Otto H. Kahn House =

Building in Manhattan, New York

- U.S. National Register of Historic Places
- New York State Register of Historic Places
- New York City Landmark
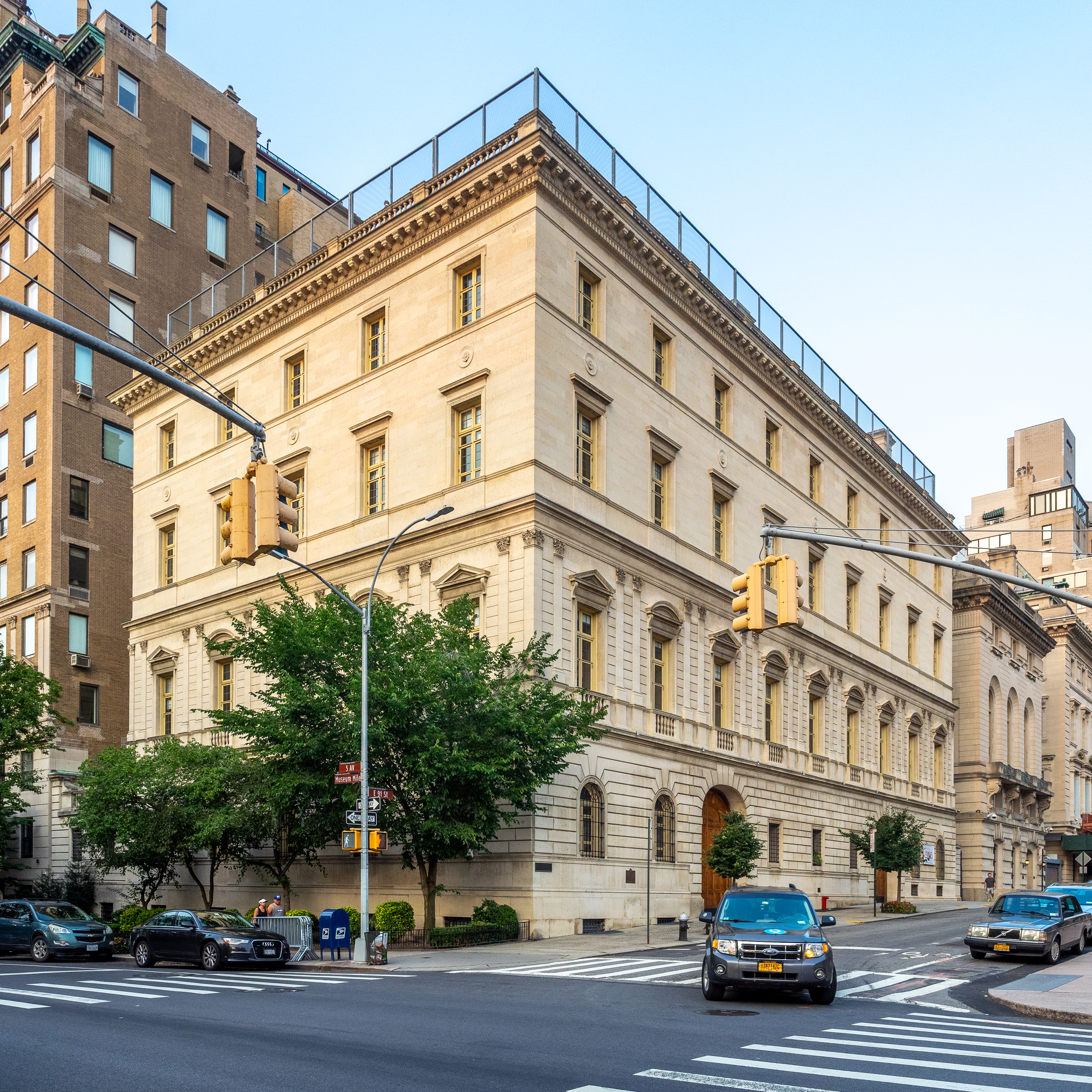
- Interactive map of Otto H. Kahn House
- Location: 1 East 91st Street, Manhattan, New York, US
- Coordinates: 40°47′05″N 73°57′28″W
- Built: 1914–1918
- Architect: J. Armstrong Stenhouse; C. P. H. Gilbert
- NRHP reference No.: 06000821
- NYSRHP No.: 06101.000248
- NYCL No.: 0675

Significant dates
- Added to NRHP: September 12, 2006
- Designated NYSRHP: June 28, 2006
- Designated NYCL: February 19, 1974

The Otto H. Kahn House is a mansion at 1 East 91st Street, at Fifth Avenue, in the Carnegie Hill section of the Upper East Side of Manhattan in New York City, New York, US. The four-story mansion was designed by architects J. Armstrong Stenhouse and C. P. H. Gilbert in the neo-Italian Renaissance style. It was completed in 1918 as the town residence of the financier and philanthropist Otto H. Kahn and his family. The Convent of the Sacred Heart, a private school, owns the Kahn House along with the adjacent James A. Burden House, which is internally connected. The mansion is a New York City designated landmark and, along with the Burden House, is listed on the National Register of Historic Places.

The mansion's facade is made of French limestone and is rusticated on the first and second stories, with large archways on the first floor. The house has French- and Italian-style interiors and is divided into front and rear sections, with an oval entrance hall connecting the floors. The first floor originally contained reception spaces while the second floor had spaces including a study, library, theater, drawing room, and dining room. On the top stories, there were 15 bedrooms with en suite dressing rooms and bathrooms.

Andrew Carnegie purchased the site in 1898 to protect the value of his nearby mansion, but he did not sell it until 1913, when Kahn bought the plot. After the house was completed, the Kahns hosted various events there, splitting their time between their 91st Street residence and Oheka Castle on Long Island. The family was seeking to sell the house by the early 1930s. After Otto Kahn died in 1934, the Convent of the Sacred Heart bought it and converted the house into classrooms, a library, and offices. The house was renovated in the late 20th century, though many of the interior spaces have been preserved.

== Site ==
The Otto H. Kahn House is at 1 East 91st Street in the Carnegie Hill section of the Upper East Side of Manhattan in New York City, New York, US. It stands on the northeast corner of Fifth Avenue and 91st Street, facing Central Park to the west. The site measures 100 feet (30 m) wide on Fifth Avenue to the west and 145 feet (44 m) wide on 91st Street to the south. During the 20th century, the house occupied the north end of Fifth Avenue's Millionaires' Row. On the same city block to the east are the James A. Burden House (which is internally connected with the Kahn House), the John Henry Hammond House, and the John and Caroline Trevor House. The Felix M. Warburg House, containing the Jewish Museum, is on the block to the north. Just south of the Otto H. Kahn House is the Andrew Carnegie Mansion at 2 East 91st Street, housing the Cooper Hewitt, Smithsonian Design Museum. The townhouses on 11, 15, and 17 East 90th Street and the Spence School are located on the same block as the Carnegie Mansion, southeast of the Kahn House.

== Architecture ==
The architects J. Armstrong Stenhouse and C. P. H. Gilbert designed the house at 1 East 91st Street for the family of financier Otto Hermann Kahn in the neo-Italian Renaissance style. It is four stories high with a basement and a protruding rooftop dormer, and the house measures about 100 feet (30 m) to its roof. The house was modeled after the Palazzo della Cancelleria of the Papal Chancellery in Rome. One 20th-century architectural writer stated that the house was inspired exclusively by 16th-century Italian architecture.

=== Facade ===
==== Front elevations ====
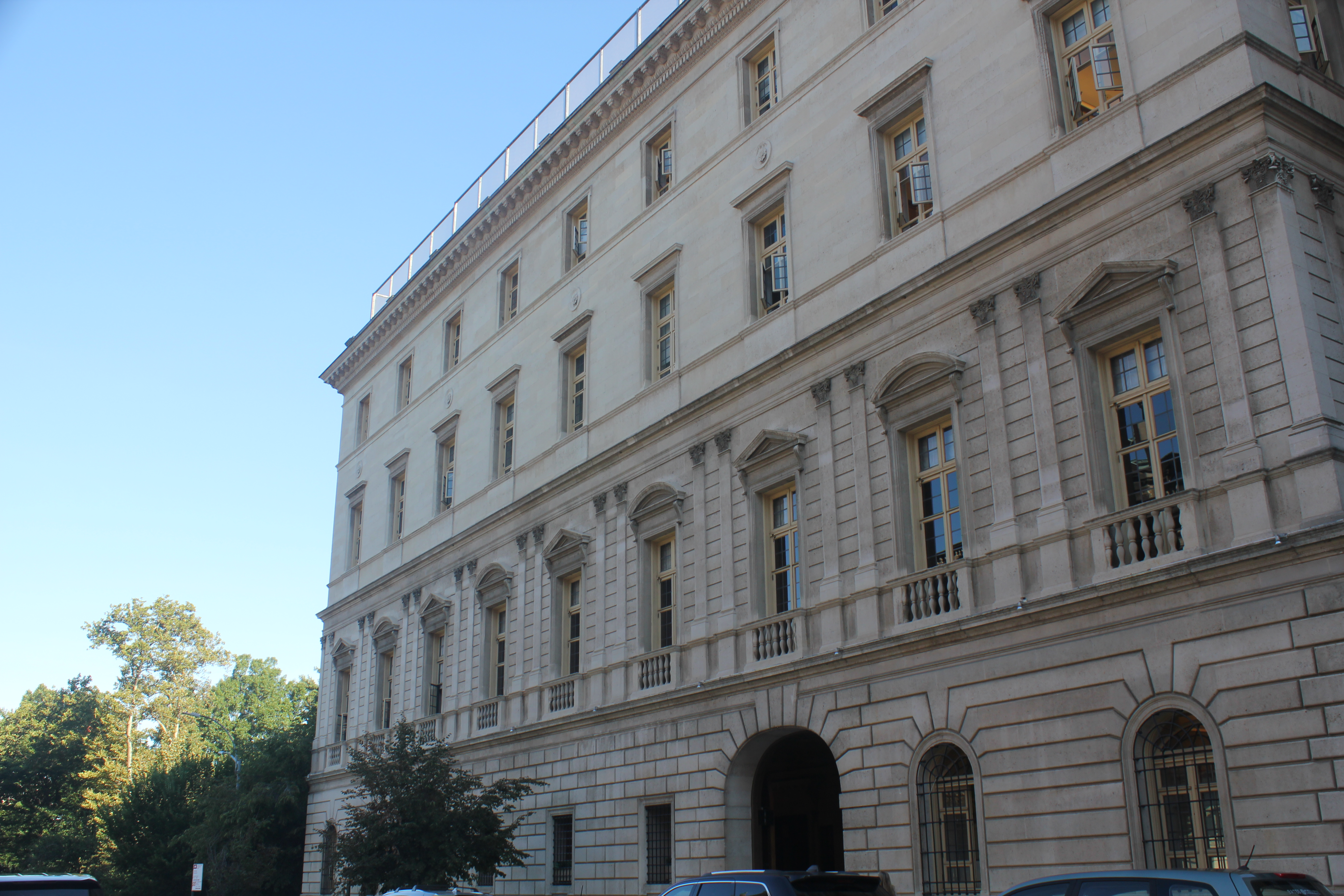
View of the facade from further east on 91st Street

The house was largely built of French limestone from St. Quentin, with Caen stone used on the lowest two stories. In general, the facade has lead-came glass or zinc-came glass windows. The exterior faces of each window frame are made of molded limestone, while the interior faces are made of wood. On the lowest portion of the facade is a water table that wraps around the southern elevation on 91st Street and the western elevation on Fifth Avenue.

Above the water table, the first story of the facade is rusticated, with deep joints crossing the facade horizontally, and contains arched windows recessed between iron grilles. The use of rusticated blocks and iron grillwork was intended to make the structure appear like a Renaissance palazzo. On 91st Street, there are two larger archways with paneled wooden doors. A short indoor driveway (also described as a porte-cochère) connects the two archways and contains the house's main entrance. There is a niche at either end of the driveway, as well as a coffered ceiling, which is made of stucco. At the extreme eastern end of the southern elevation is a rusticated wall, with service areas behind the walls.

The second story is designed like a piano nobile and is rusticated, albeit with smoother limestone and shallower joints compared with the first floor. Each window is designed as a French window with leaded glass panes and wood frames behind a small balustrade. Above the second-story windows are pediments that are alternately segmentally arched and triangular, and there are vertical pilasters between each of the windows. The third and fourth stories have a smooth facade, except for a horizontal string course that connects the fourth-floor windows. There are cornices above the third-floor windows, while the fourth-floor windows have simpler frames and are proportionally smaller. Above the fourth floor is a protruding cornice with modillions, which is surrounded by a balustrade.

==== Rear elevations and courtyard ====
Portions of the northern and eastern elevations are visible from the street and are similar to the western and southern elevations. The eastern elevation has a Renaissance-style tower topped by a water tank. On the roof are several rooms that are set back slightly from the facade. Visible from the roof was a small garden house, a fountain, and a porch, which one critic from 1919 described as "a glimpse of Italy, in more intimate guise".

A courtyard is on the northern side of the site and extends into the center of the building, allowing rooms in the middle of the house to be illuminated by natural light. The stone facade of the courtyard is decorated with elements such as arches and stairways; this was a contrast to the lightwells of similar mansions, which did not have decorative facades. There is a partially enclosed one-story terrace to the north of the house, which has a rusticated facade. This terrace is accessed by steps leading down from a loggia, which surrounds the courtyard on two sides. The courtyard's southeastern corner has a water tank and a staircase tower. At the rear of the house's northeast corner is an annex for the Convent of the Sacred Heart's lower school, which has a limestone facade.

=== Features ===
The house has a floor area of 50,316 square feet (4,674.5 m^{2}) and was one of Manhattan's largest private houses, as well as one of the largest in the U.S. It has been cited as containing a total of 65, 66, or 80 rooms. Each of the main floors spanned about 13,000 square feet (1,200 m^{2}). The private driveway was originally guarded by a doorman, and there was an oak-paneled library and spacious reception room. Original photographs of the more formal rooms taken during the Kahns' occupancy show them decorated in an 18th-century French and Italian style; many of the original decorations remain intact.

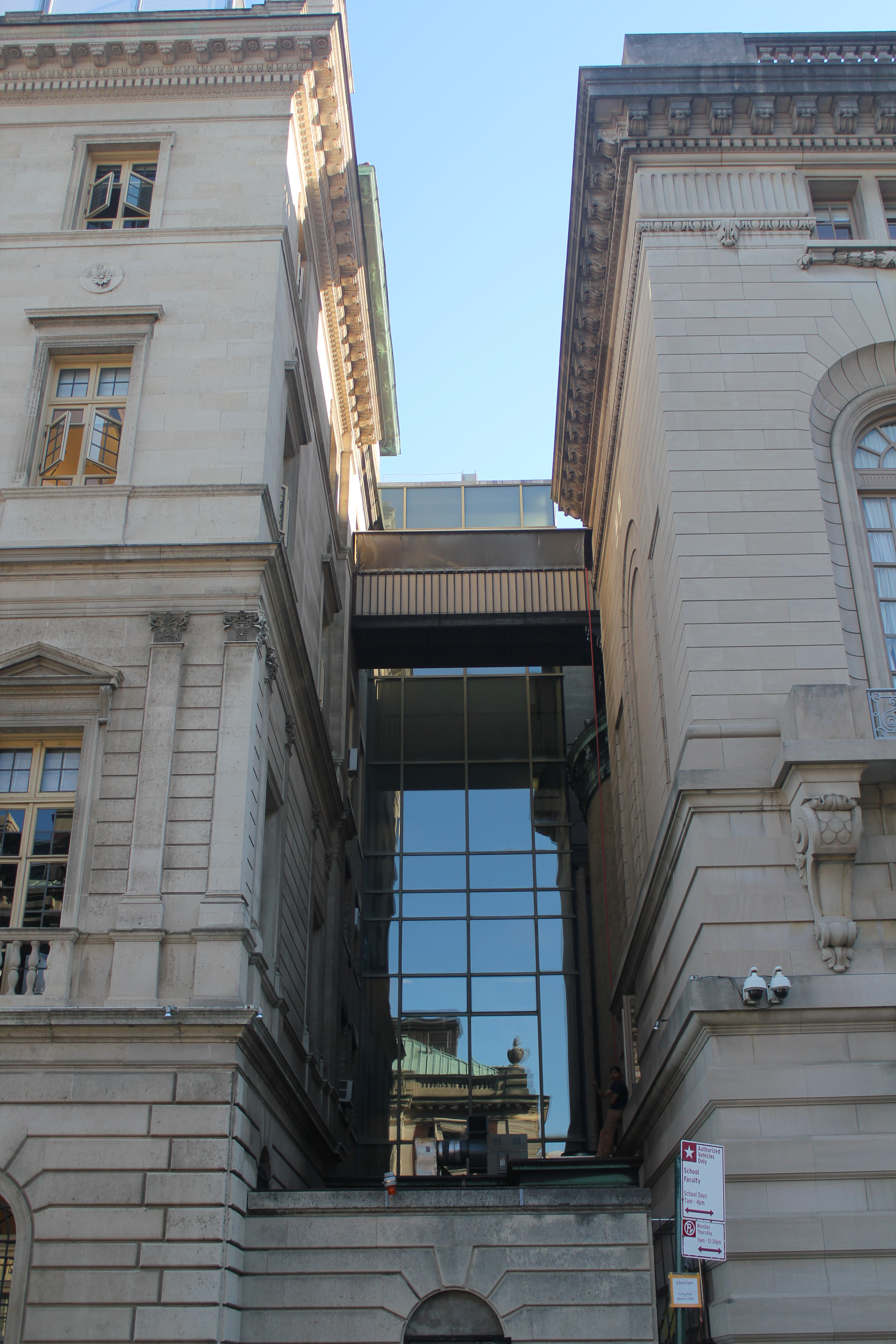
Connection with the Burden House, constructed after the Convent of the Sacred Heart took over both houses

The first through third stories are connected to the Burden House's rear rooms via a glass passageway that is set back from the street. Since the floor levels are uneven, the connection is slightly sloped.

==== Basements and first story ====
There are two basement levels and five above-ground stories. The second basement had electrical generators and a heating plant. The first basement had servants' living quarters, a kitchen, and a pantry, as well as 40 bedrooms for servants. These spaces also contained walk-in freezers and full height marble control panels with brass hardware. The control panels operated the house's vacuum system and dumbwaiters.

The entrance leads to an entry hall with limestone walls supporting a plaster groin vault. This hall is decorated with pediments, niches, and cornice moldings, and the interior courtyard is visible from the northern end of the hall. There is a grand staircase on the western wall (designed in a Florentine Renaissance style) and a smaller staircase and elevator on the eastern wall. The elevator originally had a mural because Otto Kahn's wife Addie was claustrophobic. A stone tower with a concealed window allowed Kahn to watch his visitors enter the main hall. When the Kahns lived in the house, there was a bowl in the middle of the entry hall, where guests dropped their visiting cards.

The rest of the first floor was used as reception spaces. As originally arranged, there was a smaller hall leading west of the entry hall, which in turn connected to three reception spaces on the first floor. The Convent of the Sacred Heart school, which took over the house in 1934, converted these spaces into offices, meeting spaces, and ancillary spaces.

==== Second story ====
The second-story rooms, which include the family's former study, library, theater, drawing room, and dining room, were intended as the most ornate in the house. The spaces have ceilings measuring close to 20 feet (6.1 m) high. On the south side of the floor, from east to west, are the dining room, French salon and art gallery. The dining room was built with wood paneling, while the salon is decorated in the Louis XVI style with a vaulted ceiling and a large marble fireplace. The gallery was used as a reception room; a spiral staircase rises from one corner of the art gallery, linking to a sitting room on the third story. The three rooms on the south were accessed by a central foyer. which faces the courtyard to the north and features a fireplace and two limestone stairways to the upper stories. Also on the first floor are a library room to the west, a cloistered loggia north of the courtyard, an Adam style ballroom to the northeast, and a butler's pantry to the east. Kahn's library, which originally had furniture with custom-made locks and keys, had a leather-topped gift and two Dutch artists' portraits.

The Convent of the Sacred Heart has modified some of these rooms over the years, although many of the original architectural details remain intact. For example, the dining and drawing rooms were merged into a single chapel room, the study and library served as the school's middle and upper school libraries, and the theater was converted into the school's performance room. The school built shelves into the walls of the 30-by-50-foot (9.1 by 15.2 m) family library room, which could accommodate 500 books. There is also a ballroom, which is described as having a vaulted ceiling with a 20-foot-tall (6.1 m) crystal chandelier. These spaces can be rented out for events and film shoots.

==== Upper stories ====
On the third and fourth stories, there were 15 bedrooms, each with en suite dressing rooms and bathrooms. The third story initially featured the Kahn family's bedrooms. Otto Kahn had a bedroom, bathroom, dressing room, and office to himself, while his wife Adelaide (Addie) had a bedroom, bathroom, and boudoir. There was also a sitting room shared by husband and wife. The Kahns' children slept on the fourth floor. Whenever the Kahns' children invited guests over, a servant escorted these guests to an elevator that went directly to the fourth floor. The Convent of the Sacred Heart has converted both levels to classrooms. Kahn's former fourth-story study serves as a library for the school.

The fifth story included servants' bedrooms. These rooms had vaulted ceilings, glass walls, and doors leading to a rooftop deck. There was also a penthouse overlooking Central Park, with an artist's atelier on the roof. This penthouse was designed to resemble an Italian garden house and had a terrace with a balustrade. The Convent of the Sacred Heart's lower-school annex, at the northeast corner of the house, includes a library, classrooms, and offices. This annex also has a connection to the Burden House's rear rooms.

== History ==
In December 1898, the industrialist Andrew Carnegie bought all of the lots on Fifth Avenue between 90th and 92nd streets, with the intent of building his mansion on some of these plots. Carnegie ultimately decided to erect his mansion only on the plots between 90th and 91st streets. He retained ownership of several nearby lots to protect his home's value, selling them only to "congenial neighbors". Carnegie sold four land lots on 91st Street to the businessman William Douglas Sloane in December 1900, which became the Burden and Hammond houses, the residences of two of Sloane's daughters. Carnegie tried to split up the parcel at the northeast corner of 91st Street and Fifth Avenue in 1906, with plans to sell half of it to the politician Lloyd S. Bryce. Sloane and his daughters all opposed the sale, and they filed a lawsuit which prevented Carnegie from selling that plot to anyone. Bryce decided not to buy the corner parcel.

=== Development ===
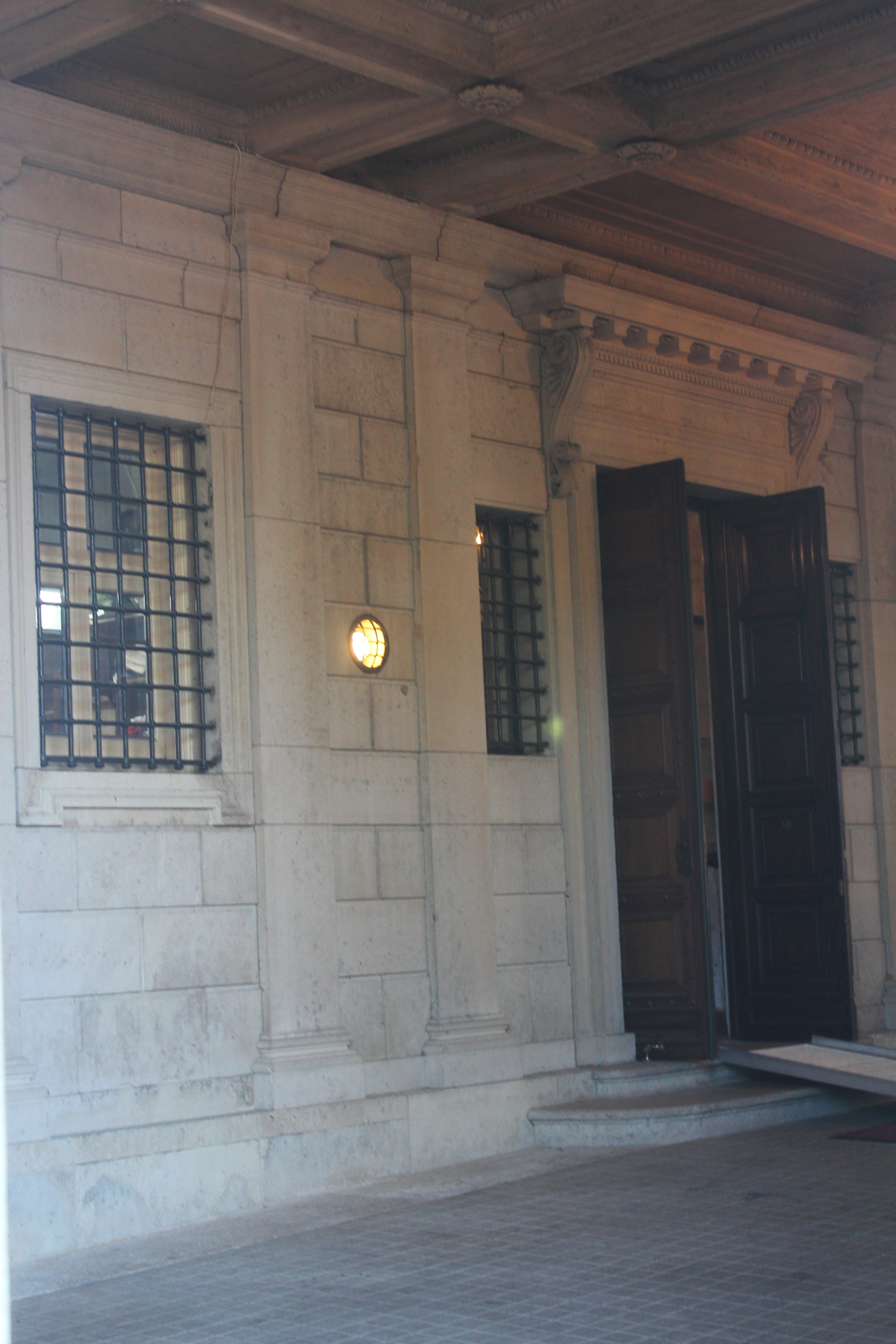
Carriage entrance

The Jewish-American financier Otto Hermann Kahn was the next owner of the lot at 91st Street and Fifth Avenue, as Carnegie believed that Kahn would be able to develop a house that fit in with the area's architecture. Kahn, who had immigrated to the U.S. in 1893, was a senior partner at the investment bank Kuhn, Loeb and Co. Despite Kahn's wealth, he and his family had relocated several times to avoid antisemitism, which at the time was prevalent even in high society. By the 1910s, he resided on 68th Street and had a second house in New Jersey. Prior to buying the 91st Street lot, he had purchased a site twenty blocks south on 71st Street, next to the Henry Clay Frick House, and there were rumors that he would move out of the U.S. altogether. News media reported in May 1913 that Kahn had purchased the lot at the northeast corner of Fifth Avenue and 91st Street from Carnegie. Carnegie sold the corner of Fifth Avenue and 91st Street to the Lawyers' Realty Company (representing Kahn) in June 1913. Sources disagree on whether Kahn paid $675,000, or whether he paid $725,000 and took a $675,000 mortgage loan from Carnegie.

After the Sloanes dropped their lawsuit against Carnegie, Kahn sold a 26-inch-wide (66 cm) strip of land on the eastern side of the lot to the Burden family. Kahn would later sell off his 71st Street site in 1915. In the meantime, Kahn hired J. Armstrong Stenhouse of the United Kingdom to design the structure. Because Stenhouse had no license to practice architecture in New York, Kahn hired Gilbert as the house's architect in August 1913; the architect had previously designed Kahn's 68th Street residence. Gilbert designed a four-story, classical-style structure surrounded by open spaces. Kahn also planned to import some European woodwork, so the dimensions of the house's rooms were designed specifically to fit this woodwork. He also planned to import French stone.

Workers began excavating the site in August 1913, and excavations were complete by the end of the year. Gilbert submitted plans for the house to the Manhattan Bureau of Buildings in 1914, at which point the house was to cost $375,000. Work was briefly halted before resuming in May 1914, although Gilbert had still not received bids for the house's construction at the time. Ultimately, René Sergent was hired as a consulting engineer, while the Thompson–Starrett Company was hired as the general contractor. Work commenced again in July 1914, but the foundations were still not complete by late 1915. Construction of the house itself had begun by early 1916; The New York Times said the same year that Kahn's house was one of the largest to be built in the neighborhood in several years. The project encountered various delays, including the outbreak of World War I, which made it difficult to import some of the French stone. The Kahn House was nearly completed by early 1917, though Kahn was still listed as living on 68th Street.

=== Use as residence ===
Otto Kahn's house was completed around 1918, and his family was hosting events at the house by that March. He, his wife Addie, and their children Maud, Margaret, Gilbert, and Roger mainly lived at the 91st Street mansion afterward. They also maintained a suburban estate, Oheka Castle in Long Island, which they used during the summers. The 91st Street mansion housed the family's 22 servants as well. Twelve of the servants worked for Addie Kahn, and they served tea in her dressing room every day even if she was not there. Otto Kahn, who was a major donor to French charities during World War I, also invited French sailors and troops to his house. Despite Kahn's extreme wealth, he took the subway from his house to his office in Lower Manhattan each day. The house was decorated with tapestries, in addition to paintings from Kahn's art collection, such as Vittore Carpaccio's late-15th-century portrait St. Eustace. In 1919, the first full year after the house was finished, it was valued at $1.35 million.

In the house's early years, the Kahns frequently hosted theatrical figures and financiers in the ballroom. The house hosted events such as a debutante ball for the Kahns' daughter Margaret in 1920, an exhibition of Persian art in 1927, and Margaret's wedding in 1928. When Otto and Addie's youngest son Roger formed a jazz orchestra in 1924, the orchestra practiced in the mansion. Other events hosted at the house during the 1920s included musical and dance performances; meetings; charitable benefits; and parties. Because the house did not have its own garage, Kahn hired Gilbert in 1927 to design a 10-car garage for him at 422 East 89th Street.

By the late 1920s, many of Fifth Avenue's mansions were being demolished to make way for apartments; although the Kahn House remained standing, an adjacent house had been replaced with a 13-story apartment building. Kahn reportedly lost over $50 million during the Wall Street Crash of 1929, although the family retained ownership of the house. The house continued to host events in the early 1930s, including a recital by Alexis Obolensky and business dinners.

The Convent of the Sacred Heart, a private girls' school, began negotiating for the house in 1932. Kahn negotiated a tentative agreement with the school in early 1934, one month before he died. Kahn died in March 1934 after a heart attack; he bequeathed everything to his children and allowed them to sell his real estate. When he died, his real estate was valued at $216,375, excluding the 91st Street mansion. At the time of Kahn's death, the Kahn House and several other houses along the block were restricted to residential use because of a covenant placed by Andrew Carnegie. The Oheka Corporation, representing Kahn's estate, filed a lawsuit in May 1934 to have the restriction removed so they could sell the house to the Convent of the Sacred Heart. Kahn's neighbors did not oppose the sale, provided that the height of the house was not increased. The restriction was thus lifted to allow the Kahn House to be sold.

=== Use as school ===
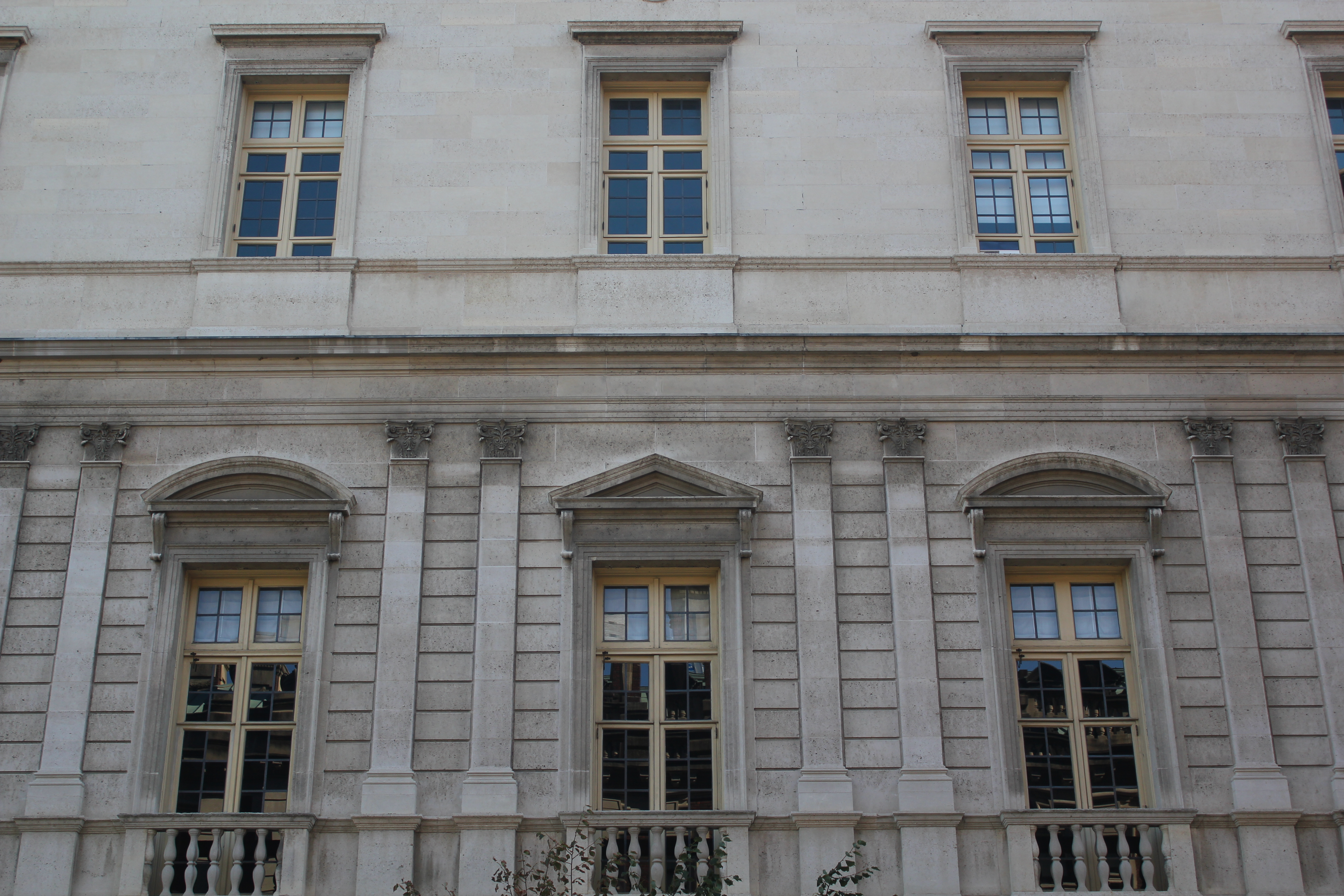
Windows on the second and third stories

In May 1934, the Convent of the Sacred Heart paid $900,000 for the house and sold its existing building on Madison Avenue to the Oheka Corporation. One critic called the sale a sign of the transformation of the surrounding neighborhood, while the real-estate executive Lawrence B. Elliman described the Kahn House as one of the largest "disappearing New York mansions" that were being converted to non-residential uses. The school filed plans in May 1934 to convert the house into a school building for $15,000. The modifications, designed by Frederick Rinn, included a new basement entrance on Fifth Avenue, a mezzanine above one of the basement rooms, as well as a new refectory, plumbing, and stairs. The Convent of the Sacred Heart did not have to pay taxes on the building because it was an educational and religious institution. The former ballroom became the school chapel. In addition to classes, the school hosted events at the house, such as annual luncheons, lectures, and film screenings. Every December, the school invited the public to attend Christmas tree lighting ceremonies in the lower stories.

Sacred Heart acquired the neighboring Burden House in 1940, using that house as a boarding school. A connection was built between the Burden and Kahn houses. The main school itself, which served students from kindergarten to high school, was located in the Kahn House at 1 East 91st Street. By the late 1960s, the school's nuns lived on the fifth floor of the house. After Sacred Heart sought to raise $90,000 for an expansion of the school in 1966, students' parents donated $150,000. Sacred Heart bought four adjacent townhouses along 92nd Street, and it considered demolishing these townhouses and the adjacent Burden House. (Note: The 92nd Street townhouses were not demolished and were sold in 1978.) The New York City Landmarks Preservation Commission (LPC) consequently designated the Burden and Kahn houses as landmarks.

During the 1970s, the Burden and Kahn houses began hosting regular chamber music performances. After a Sacred Heart alumnus requested permission to host her wedding at the Burden House in 1973, Sacred Heart began renting out both houses' ballrooms and the Kahn House's courtyard for weddings outside of school hours. The houses also hosted seminars, parties, photo shoots, and benefit parties. There were also occasional tours of the Kahn House, and the structure continued to host events into the late 20th century, including TV commercial shoots and antiques shows. In general, visitors not affiliated with the school could only enter the house by appointment.

The architectural firm of Buttrick, White, and Burtis was hired in the early 1980s to add a gymnasium, laboratories, and classroom space in the Burden and Kahn houses. The project, which was estimated to cost $1.5 million, was funded in part from revenue generated by the Burden House's ballroom, as well as from events such as tours and Christmas tree sales. Building Conservation Associates also examined the Kahn House's facade in the 1990s and found that it had been damaged over the years by the acidity of the air. As such, Buttrick, White, and Burtis also supervised a restoration of the facade at a cost of $1.3 million; the project included cleaning the stone and infilling some of the larger holes. By the 2000s, the Kahn House was known as the Convent of the Sacred Heart's Duchesne Residence. The house contains Convent of the Sacred Heart's middle and upper schools as of 2024.

== Impact ==
=== Reception ===
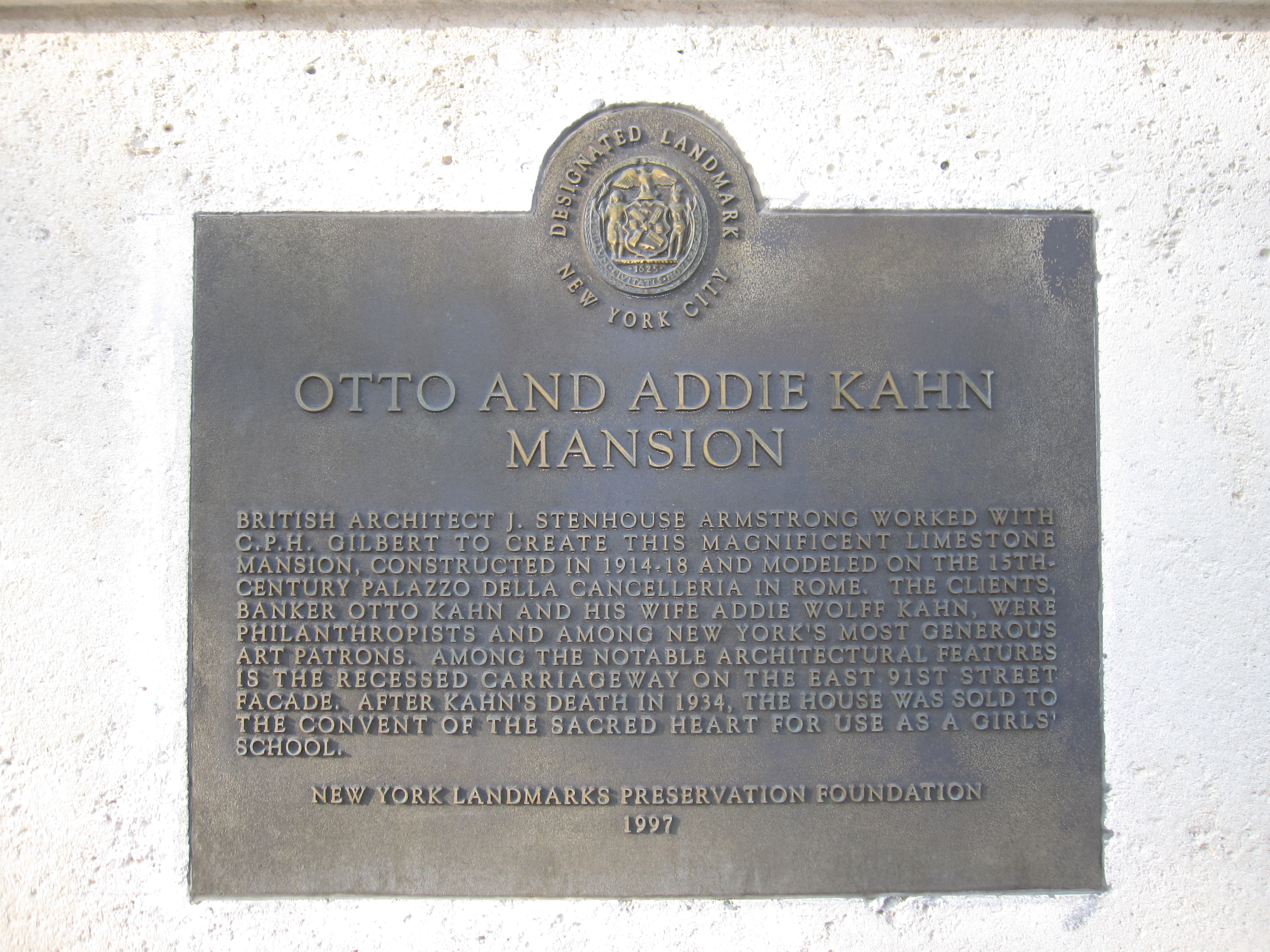
Historical plaque

Upon the house's completion, the Architectural Review praised the mansion as "a remarkable example of well-balanced re-adjustment in those aesthetic elements that are found in architecture of the early sixteenth century in Italy". The magazine further deemed J. Armstrong Stenhouse to have "achieved a work which ranks as the foremost of its kind in this country." The Landmarks Preservation Commission described the building as "the finest Italian Renaissance-style mansion in New York City".

Architectural critic Henry Hope Reed Jr. wrote in 1961 that the Kahn, Burden, and Hammond houses were "the crown jewel of the block", and Women's Wear Daily said the building was "an architecturally perfect sample of Italian Renaissance architecture". A critic for The New York Times described the Kahn and Burden houses in 1972 as having "what may be the most lordly rooms any New York schoolchild studies in". In a 1985 book about New York City's architecture, John Tauranac wrote that the building "comes as close to a true Italian Renaissance-style house as there is in New York".

The historian Christopher Gray said in 1990 that the Kahn House was the "last and grandest" of the houses on the surrounding block, though he later wrote that it was "very reserved" compared with other structures like the Warburg House one block north. Jayne Merkel wrote in 1996 that the Kahn and Burden houses "give the school a uniqueness and elegance that money cannot easily buy". Gray wrote in 2014 that the houses helped form one of the "grandest blocks" in the city.

=== Media and landmark designations ===
The mansion has also been used as a filming location. For example, the 1971 movie The Anderson Tapes was partially filmed at the Kahn House, as was the 2009 film Duplicity. The house was used to film television commercials in the late 20th century, as well as a video for Julio Iglesias's song "Moonlight Lady" in 1984.

The LPC selected the Kahn House in 1963 as one of 300 tentative city landmarks, and the American Institute of Architects included the building in an exhibit of the city's historic buildings in 1967. The LPC first proposed the Carnegie Hill Historic District in 1966, which would have included both the Kahn and Burden houses. The LPC began considering the buildings as individual city landmarks in 1967, but the Convent of the Sacred Heart, had opposed the designations until the New York Landmarks Conservancy provided a loan to preserve the two buildings. The LPC designated the Kahn and Burden mansions as individual landmarks in February 1974, but the houses were not initially among the properties listed as part of the Carnegie Hill Historic District, which was designated the same year. When the Carnegie Hill Historic District was expanded in 1993, both structures were included in the expanded district. The Kahn and Burden mansions were collectively added to the New York State Register of Historic Places on June 28, 2006, and to the National Register of Historic Places on September 12, 2006.

== See also ==
- List of New York City Designated Landmarks in Manhattan from 59th to 110th Streets
- National Register of Historic Places listings in Manhattan from 59th to 110th Streets
