= Carnegie Hill =

Neighborhood of Manhattan in New York City

Coordinates: 40.784726°N 73.956070°W

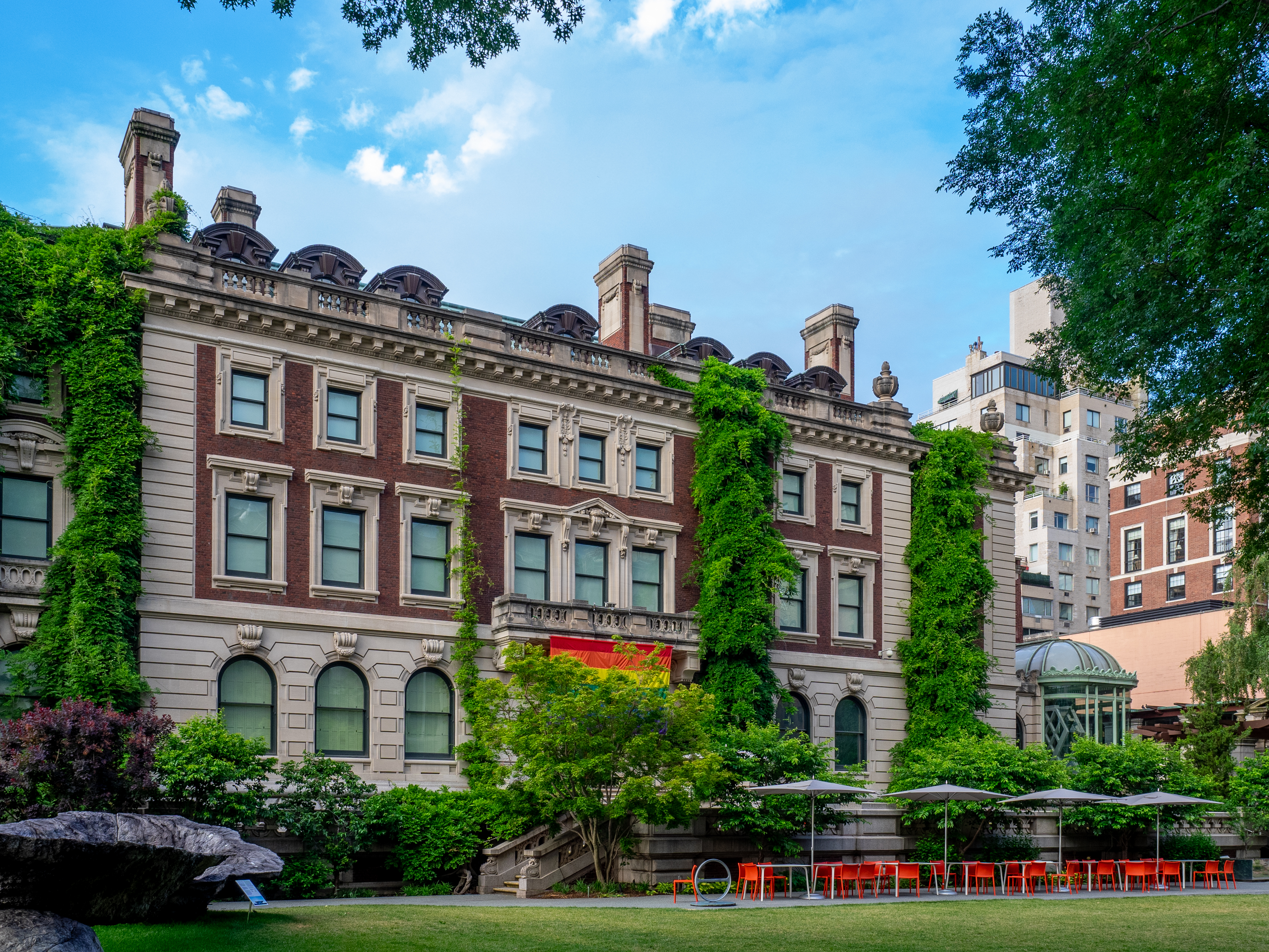
The Andrew Carnegie Mansion is a neighborhood landmark and its namesake structure.

Carnegie Hill is a neighborhood within the Upper East Side, in the borough of Manhattan in New York City. Its boundaries are 86th Street on the south, Fifth Avenue (Central Park) on the west, with a northern boundary at 98th Street that continues just past Lexington Avenue and turns south to 96th Street and proceeds east up to, but not including, Third Avenue. The neighborhood is part of Manhattan Community District 8.

In the 2000s, the perceived northern boundary on Park Avenue has edged over 96th Street into what was traditionally Spanish Harlem, leading to that area sometimes being called Upper Carnegie Hill, especially by real-estate brokers. According to the official Carnegie Hill Neighbors website, the Carnegie Hill neighborhood extends from 86th to 98th Streets, from Fifth Avenue up to, but not including, Third Avenue.

== History ==
The neighborhood is named after the mansion that Andrew Carnegie built in 1901 at Fifth Avenue and 91st Street. Today the mansion is the home of the Cooper Hewitt, Smithsonian Design Museum, a branch of the Smithsonian Institution. Facing it across 91st Street is the Italian palazzo-style Otto H. Kahn House, currently the home of the Convent of the Sacred Heart, a Roman Catholic girls' school. Several townhouses in the area have been converted to schools, including the William Goadby Loew House on 93rd Street (formerly the Smithers Alcoholism Center), currently occupied by the Spence School, and next door, the Virginia Graham Fair Vanderbilt House, converted to a school by the Lycée Français, but sold in 2005 to a private owner. The architecture of the neighborhood includes apartment buildings along Park Avenue and Fifth Avenue, brownstones (with stoops) and townhouses on the side streets, condos, co-ops and a handful of mansions, of which some are now used by the Cooper Hewitt, Smithsonian Design Museum, The Jewish Museum, the National Academy of Design, the Dalton School and other organizations. From the 1950s to 1971, the National Audubon Society was housed in the Willard Straight House, a red brick Colonial Revival townhouse at 1130 Fifth Avenue. When it moved to NoHo, the International Center of Photography moved in but later consolidated its operations in Midtown near Bryant Park. In 2001, it again became a private residence.

In 1989, the Jewish Museum demolished its 1963 modernist addition and courtyard, replacing it with a new extension opened in 1993 that mimics the French Gothic details of the Warburg Mansion, the museum's home since 1947. The limestone was crafted in Morningside Heights at the Cathedral Stoneworks. Frank Lloyd Wright's originally maligned and now celebrated Guggenheim Museum opened on Fifth Avenue in 1959. The New York Road Runners occupies a townhouse around the corner at 9 East 89th Street, a block informally known as Fred Lebow Place. There are two preserved wood-frame houses at 120 and 122 East 92nd Street.

Similar to the official lines of the historic district, the borders of the neighborhood form an irregular rectangle and the northern boundary, which traditionally was 96th Street, has on Park Avenue edged into what was traditionally Spanish Harlem.

The northern section neighborhood was once seen as a less fashionable end of the East Side, but is now prized for its aesthetic sensibility, museums, schools, restaurants and neighborhood feel. Besides, Andrew Carnegie, Marjorie Merriweather Post, Margaret Rockefeller Strong and John Hay Whitney all made their homes north of 90th Street.

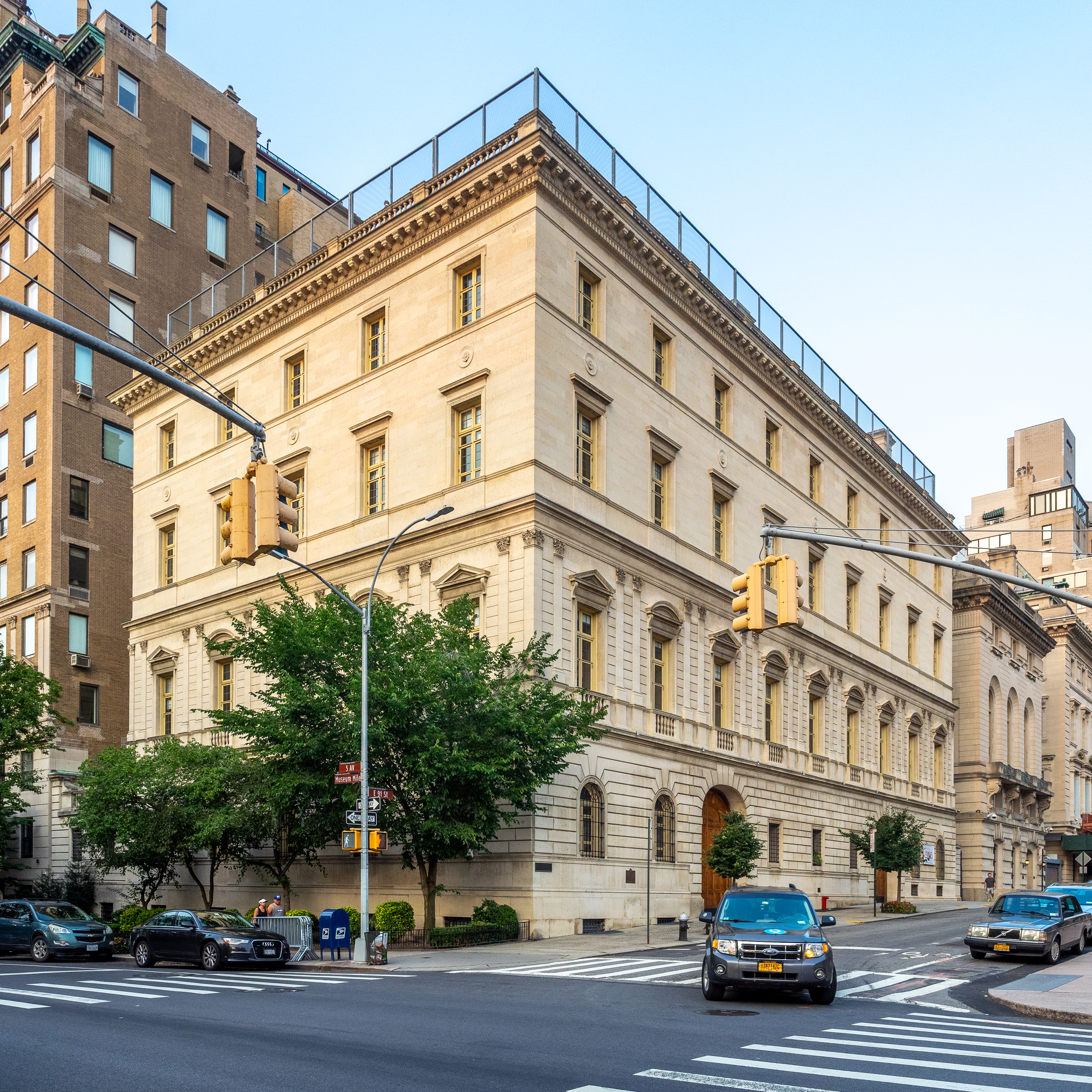
The Otto H. Kahn House, Fifth Avenue at 91st Street

== Preservation ==
The Carnegie Hill Historic District, designated as such by the Landmarks Preservation Commission on July 23, 1974, and then expanded on December 21, 1993, runs from 86th Street in the south to just north of 98th Street in the north. Its western boundary is Central Park, and its eastern boundary varies from Madison Avenue in some parts to Lexington Avenue farther east in others. There are efforts to expand this district to protect structures not designated as landmarks, including 179 East 93rd Street, where the Marx Brothers were raised. Proponents include the 93rd Street Beautification Association and Carnegie Hill Neighbors, organizations which, seeking to preserve the village-like environment, spurred the creation of the historic district and actively monitor its well being. In its more than thirty years of operation, its well-publicized battles have included advocating against an adult education center near the 92nd Street Y, plans for more high rise apartments and additions to existing brownstones.

== Prominent locations ==
- 92nd Street Y is a cultural and community center.

== Education ==
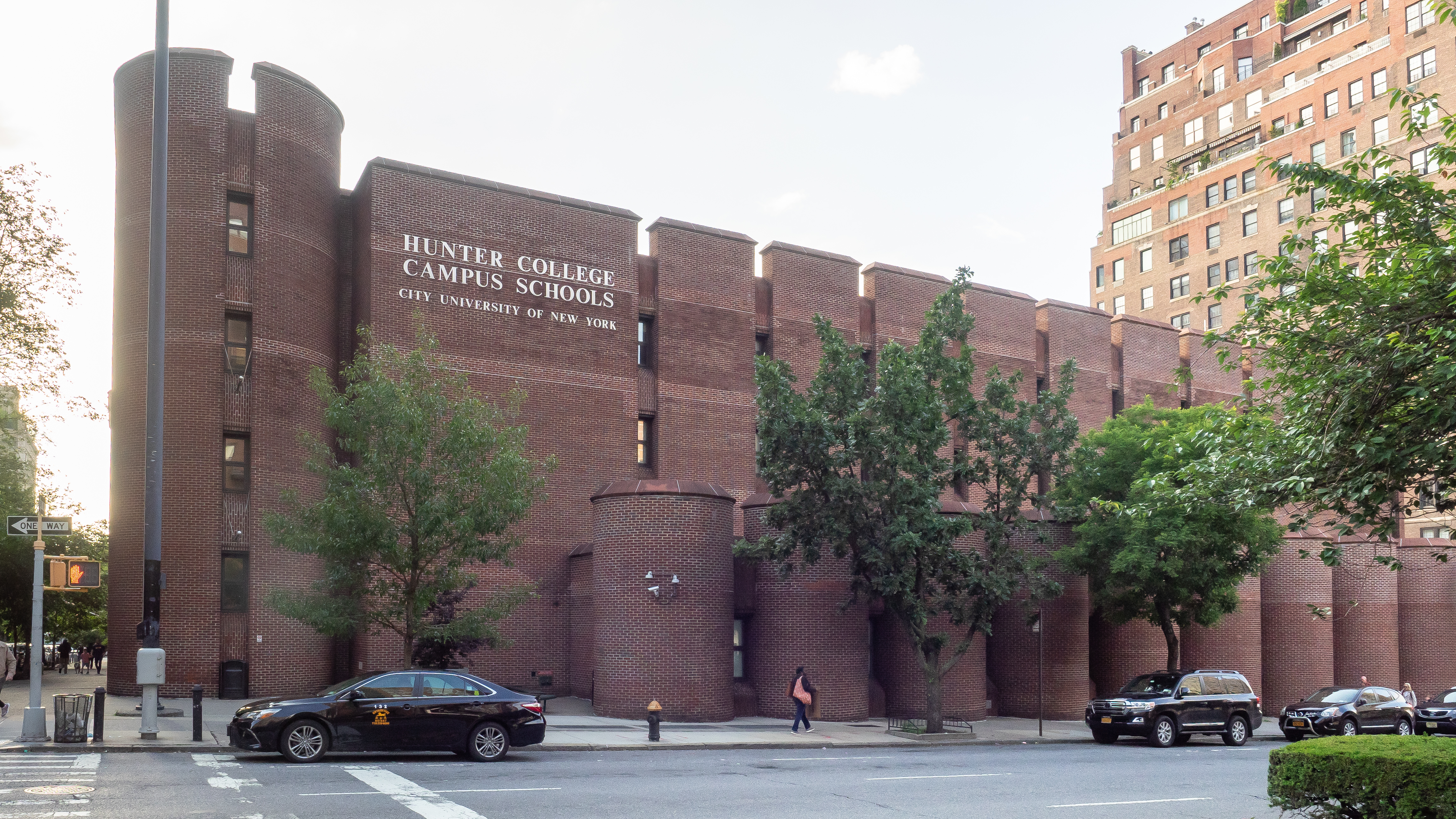
Hunter College High School

Hunter College High School, a highly selective nationally ranked high school, is located at the corner of 94th Street and Park Avenue.

The New York City Department of Education operates public schools such as Lower Lab, one of three gifted and talented programs in NYC.

The main campus of the La Scuola d'Italia Guglielmo Marconi Italian international school is in Carnegie Hill at 12 East 96th Street.

== See also ==
- Hardenbergh/Rhinelander Historic District
- Museum Mile, New York City
- Yorkville
