= Convent of the Sacred Heart (New York City) =

Private school in Manhattan, New York

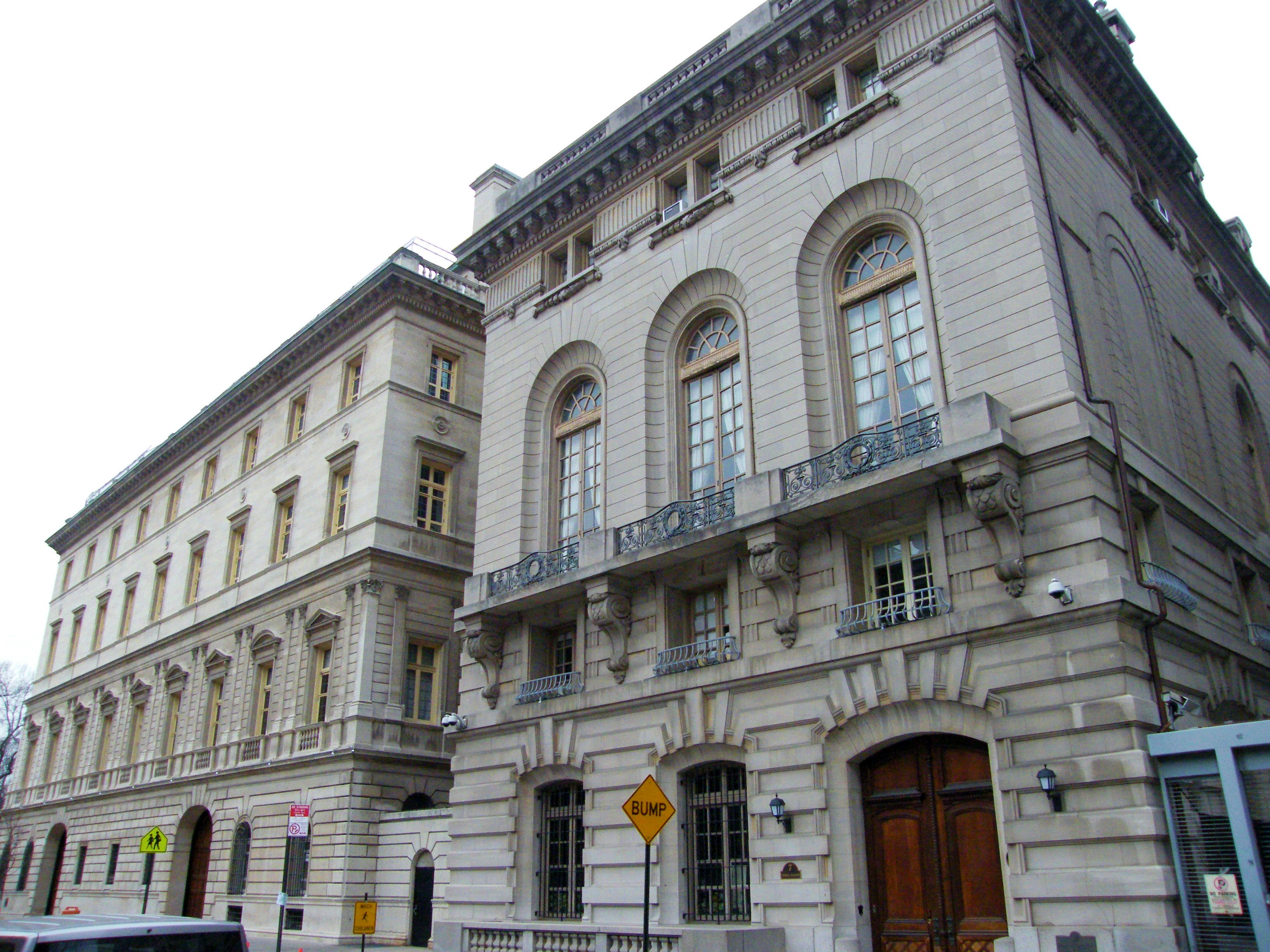
- The school is housed in the Otto H. Kahn House (left) and James A. Burden House (right).

Location
- 1 East 91st Street; Manhattan, New York City, New York; United States; 40°47′5″N 73°57′27″W

Information
- Type: Private, day, college-preparatory
- Religious affiliation: Roman Catholic
- Established: 1881 (145 years ago)
- Founder: Society of the Sacred Heart
- Chairperson: Lorena Sayer O'Brien
- Head of school: Kate Adams
- Head of Upper School: Margaret Savino
- Chaplain: Rev. John Kamas
- Grades: PK – 12
- Gender: Girls
- Enrollment: 740 (approximately) (2023-2024)
- Language: English (medium of instruction)
- Campus type: Urban
- Colors: Red and white
- Athletics: 11 interscholastic sports: Paul Culff, Head of Athletics and Wellness
- Athletics conference: Athletic Association of Independent Schools, New York State Association of Independent Schools Athletic Association
- Mascot: Cardinal
- Team name: Cardinals
- Accreditation: New York State Association of Independent Schools
- Publication: Zenith (literary magazine)
- Newspaper: Spirit of 91st Street
- Yearbook: Cornerstone
- Affiliation: National Association of Independent Schools, National Coalition of Girls’ Schools, Independent Schools Association of Greater New York, International Schools Association and the Network of Sacred Heart Schools in the United States, European Council of International Schools
- Head of Middle School: Thomas Lytle
- Head of Lower School: Amy Pacula
- Upper School Dean of Studies: Arlene Padilla
- Director of Admissions: Rachael Maccheisi
- Website: cshnyc.org

Convent of the Sacred Heart is an independent Catholic all-girls' school in Manhattan, New York City. Teaching from pre-kindergarten through twelfth grade, it is located on the Upper East Side at East 91st Street and Fifth Avenue.

The school is housed in the former Otto H. Kahn House and James A. Burden House, both of which are New York City-Designated Landmarks, and are listed on the National Register of Historic Places.

== History ==
Founded in 1881 by the Society of the Sacred Heart, a Catholic women's religious congregation established in France in 1800, the school is one of New York City's oldest private schools for girls.

The school was originally housed in a Manhattan brownstone on Madison Avenue at East 54th Street. By the 1930s, the school had outgrown its Madison Avenue space and moved into the Otto H. Kahn House. In 1940, the society acquired the James A. Burden House next door.

== Membership and accreditation ==
In addition to being a member of the Society of the Sacred Heart and a part of the global Network of Sacred Heart Schools, a worldwide network of over 150 schools committed to the mission of a Sacred Heart education, the school is accredited by the New York State Association of Independent Schools and is a member of the National Association of Independent Schools.

It is operated independently as part of the Network of Sacred Heart Schools. The school is also associated with the New York Interschool Association.

The school is also a member of the Independent Schools Association of Greater New York, the National Coalition of Girls’ Schools, the European Council of International Schools, the International Schools Association and the Network of Sacred Heart Schools in the United States.

== Facilities ==
The school is located in two historic mansions in the Carnegie Hill Historic District on the Upper East Side of Manhattan, at 1 East 91st Street and 7 East 91st Street, next to Central Park/Fifth Avenue and across the street from the Cooper-Hewitt Museum.

- 1 East 91st Street (Otto H. Kahn House) houses grade 5 through grade 12 (opened in 1934)
- 7 East 91st Street (James A. Burden House) houses pre-kindergarten through grade 4 (opened in 1940)

In September 2008, the school purchased a facility located at 406 East 91st Street and created a new sports center. As of September 2014, the athletic center was open.

== Enrollment, tuition and fees ==
Tuition and payment for the 2024-2025 school year:

- Pre-kindergarten: $36,990 (for half day), $45,200 (for full day)
- Junior kindergarten: $54,020
- Kindergarten – Grade 12 : $64,610
- The Lower School includes pre-kindergarten, junior kindergarten, kindergarten and grades 1 through 4
- The Middle School consists of grades 5 through 8
- The Upper School is made up of grades 9 through 12
- Students of color: 28 percent
- Average grade size (K–12): 50
- Student–faculty ratio: 6.7:1

== Notable alumnae ==
- Karen Akers – actress and singer
- Edith Bouvier Beale – socialite, fashion model and cabaret performer
- Lourdes Benedicto – actress
- Jordana Brewster – actress and model
- Dorothy Donnelly – actress and playwright
- Stefani Germanotta – singer, songwriter, actress and activist known as Lady Gaga
- Caroline Kennedy – attorney and diplomat
- Ethel Skakel Kennedy – human-rights activist
- Joan Bennett Kennedy – socialite
- Susan Konig – author and publisher
- Leah McSweeney – fashion designer
- Christa Miller – actress
- Minnie Mortimer – socialite
- Lia Neal – Olympic swimmer and medalist
- Emily Rafferty – president emeritus, Metropolitan Museum of Art
- Nicky Hilton Rothschild – heiress and socialite
- Emily Rutherfurd – actress
- Eunice Kennedy Shriver – human-rights activist
- Alix Smith – photographer
- Jean Kennedy Smith – diplomat
- Frederica von Stade – singer
- Elaine Stritch – actress and singer
- Gloria Morgan Vanderbilt – socialite
- Harriet Sylvia Ann Howland Green Wilks – socialite and heiress
- Anne Elizabeth Wilson – writer, poet, editor and pet cemetery owner
- Charlotte Selina Wood – actress

== In popular culture ==
=== Film and theatre ===
- The Dark Corner (1946) – Burden Mansion, 7 East 91st Street, as The Cathcart Gallery
- The Anderson Tapes (1971)
- 9 to 5 (1980)
- Chicago (play – 1975; film – 2002) – in the song "We Both Reached for the Gun" the character, Roxie Hart, was said to have attended the school
- The Verdict (1982)
- Working Girl (1988)
- A Perfect Murder (1998)
- Uptown Girls (2003)
- Night at the Museum (2006) – appears briefly towards the beginning of the film when Nick's teacher is putting up a sign for career day
- Falling for Grace (2006)
- Nick and Norah's Infinite Playlist (2008) – eponymous character Norah attends the school
- Duplicity (2009)

=== Literature and television ===
- A Very Gaga Thanksgiving (2011)
- Cashmere Mafia (Season 1)
- Gossip Girl (book series) – contains the line "two little Sacred Heart girls in their cute red and white checked pinafores were walking an enormous black Rottweiler" on page 86 in the first novel of the series
- Law & Order
- Madam Secretary
- Scrubs – Sacred Heart Hospital, where the series takes place, was named after the Convent of the Sacred Heart, where cast member (and wife of the series' screenwriter Bill Lawrence) Christa Miller (who portrays Jordan Sullivan) attended high school.
- White Collar
- Love Story, John F. Kennedy Jr. & Carolyn Bessette (2026)
