= William A. M. Burden =

American banker, philanthropist, and diplomat (1906–1984)

William Armistead Moale Burden Jr.

United States Ambassador to Belgium
- In office October 1, 1959 – January 19, 1961
- President: Dwight D. Eisenhower
- Preceded by: John Clifford Folger
- Succeeded by: Douglas MacArthur II

Personal details
- Born: William Armistead Moale Burden Jr. April 8, 1906 Manhattan, New York, U.S.
- Died: October 10, 1984 (aged 78) Manhattan, New York, U.S.
- Spouse: Margaret Livingston Partridge (m. 1931)
- Children: 4
- Relatives: Shirley Burden (brother); I. Townsend Burden (grandfather); Florence Vanderbilt Twombly (grandmother); Hamilton McKown Twombly (grandfather)
- Education: Harvard University; Massachusetts Institute of Technology
- Occupation: Banker; diplomat; philanthropist

William Armistead Moale Burden Jr. (April 8, 1906 – October 10, 1984) was an American banker, art collector, and philanthropist who served as U.S. Ambassador to Belgium under President Eisenhower.

== Early life ==
Burden was born on April 8, 1906, in Manhattan to William Armistead Moale Burden Sr. (1877–1909), and Florence Vanderbilt (née Twombly) (1881–1969). His younger brother, Shirley Carter Burden (1908–1989), was a prominent photographer. Their paternal grandparents were I. Townsend Burden (1838–1913) and Evelyn Byrd Moale (1847–1916), the daughter of William Armistead Moale (1800–1880) of Baltimore, Maryland, who was a descendant of the Carter and Byrd families of Virginia. Burden's grandfather was an owner of Burden Iron Works, which was founded by his great-grandfather, Henry Burden (1791–1871).

His maternal grandparents were Florence Adele Vanderbilt Twombly, a granddaughter of Commodore Cornelius Vanderbilt, and Hamilton McKown Twombly.

Burden attended and graduated from Harvard College in 1927. He also attended special aviation courses at the Massachusetts Institute of Technology.

== Career ==
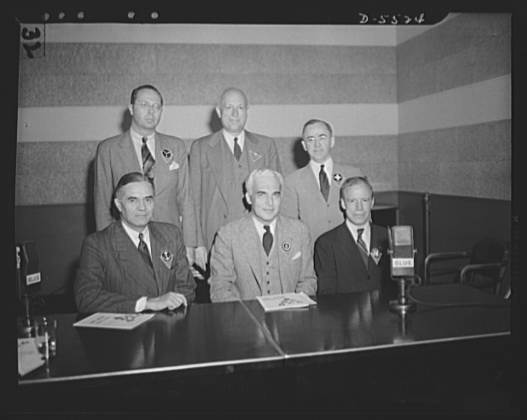
Standing, left to right: Burden, then Special Aviation Assistant to the Secretary of Commerce, Willard E. Givens, and John W. Studebaker. Seated, left to right: Ralph A. Bard, Paul V. McNutt, and Robert P. Patterson, September 1942

In 1927, after his graduation from Harvard, he was hired as an aviation research analyst at Brown Brothers Harriman & Co. From 1932 to 1938, he worked for Scudder, Stevens and Clark. In 1935, while at Scudder, he was elected a director of the United Air Lines Transport Corporation. In 1940, he was named to the board of trustees of Central Hanover Bank & Trust Co.

During World War II, he was Special Assistant for Research and Development to the Secretary of the Air Force. In 1947, after the War, he joined Smith, Barney & Co. as an aviation consultant.

In 1949, he founded William A. M. Burden & Co., an investment company intended to pool and manage his family's money. The firm is considered a pioneer in the "family office" space and continues to this day, managing half a billion dollars as of 1998. Unlike other Vanderbilt descendants, Burden "saw the fortune dissipating into smaller and smaller chunks and was determined to protect his own progeny."

In 1959, he was nominated by President Dwight D. Eisenhower as U.S. Ambassador to Belgium. He served in this role from 1959 until 1961. Burden's ambassadorship coincided with the Belgian grant of Congolese independence, the beginning of the Congo Crisis and the lead-up to the assassination of Patrice Lumumba. On July 19, 1960, Burden identified the newly independent Congolese government under Patrice Lumumba as contrary to the American vital interest, writing that "a principal objective of our political and diplomatic action must therefore be to destroy Lumumba government as now constituted ".

Burden served on the board of trustees of the Museum of Modern Art in New York City from 1943 until his death. He was elected President of the Board in 1953, succeeding Nelson Rockefeller, who resigned to accept appointment as Under Secretary of the U.S. Department of Health, Education and Welfare. Burden resigned as president in 1959, to become Ambassador, and was succeeded by Blanchette Ferry Rockefeller, the wife of John D. Rockefeller III. He resumed the presidency again afterwards from 1961 until 1965. He donated works to be auctioned off for the Museum, including Paul Cézanne's Apples, in 1960. He also served as a trustee of Columbia University, a member of the board of the Smithsonian Institution, director of the Council on Foreign Relations, chairman of the Institute for Defense Analysis. He was also a director of the Farfield Foundation, which had ties to CIA and was later revealed as a CIA front.

=== Residence ===
In the 1940s, Burden and his wife commissioned Wallace K. Harrison, an architect who was involved in the design of Rockefeller Center, the Museum of Modern Art, and the United Nations Building in New York, as well as Isamu Noguchi, the artist, to design a summer home for them in Maine. The original 4,500 square-foot house, known as "Sea Change," was completed in 1947 and in the early 1980s, an indoor swimming pool was added bringing the home up to 6,500-square-feet.

== Personal life ==
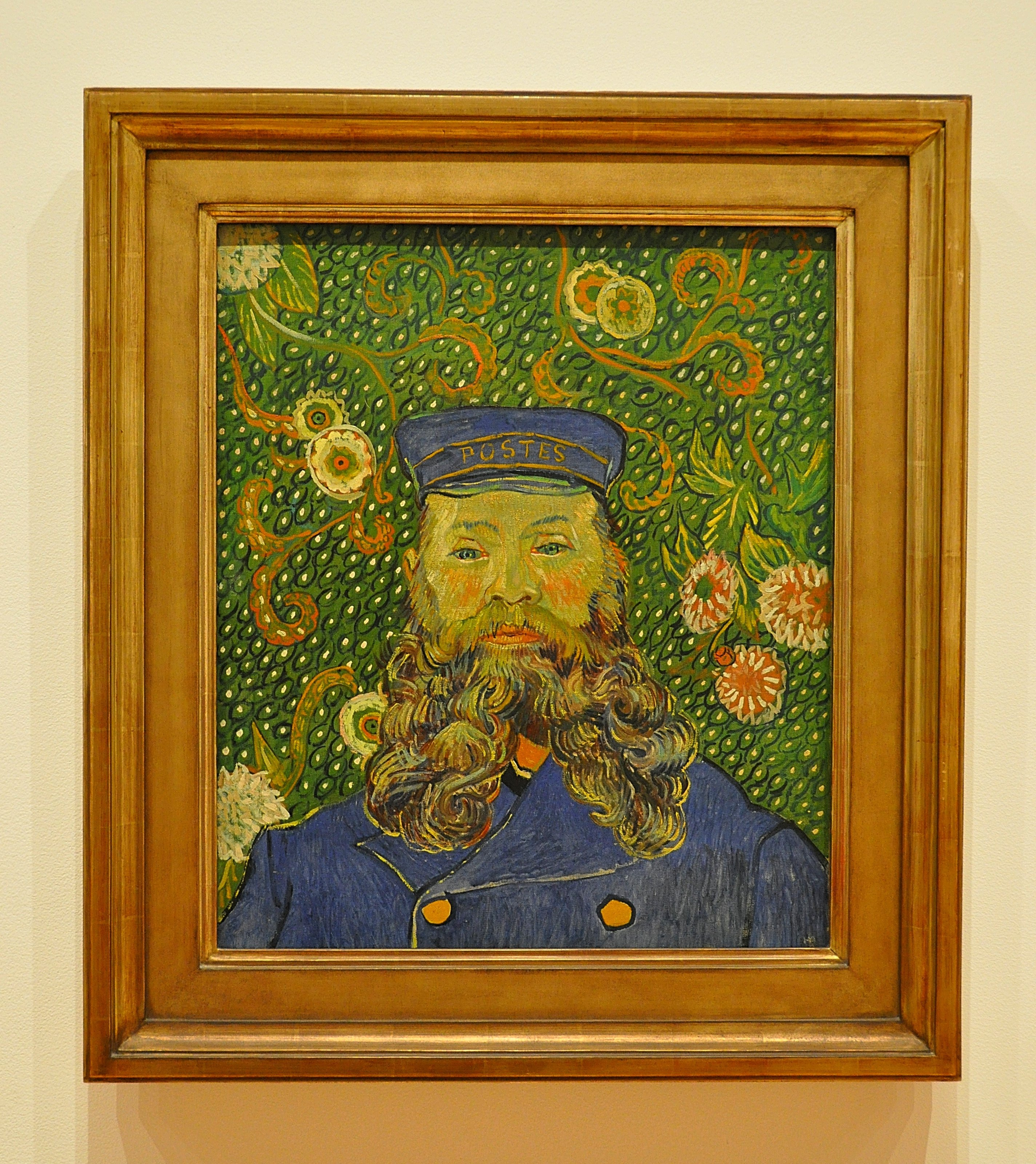
Portrait of Joseph Roulin by Vincent van Gogh, donated to MoMA by Burden

On February 16, 1931, he was married to Margaret Livingston Partridge (1909–1996), at Saint Thomas Church in Manhattan. She was a daughter of sculptor William Ordway Partridge (1861–1930) and a niece of Bishop Sidney Catlin Partridge. On her mother's side, she was a granddaughter of William H. Wetmore and great-great-great-granddaughter of Chancellor Robert L. Livingston. Together, they were the parents of four sons:

- William Armistead Moale Burden III (1931–1962), a reporter for The Washington Post who was married to Leslie Lepington Hamilton (1932–1998), granddaughter of Bishop Franklin Hamilton, in 1951.
- Robert Livingston Burden (1934–1974), who was the head of the science department at Thomas Jefferson School in St. Louis.
- Hamilton Twombly Burden (1937–2015), who was an author.
- Ordway Partridge Burden (b. 1944), who married Jean Elizabeth (née Poor) Lynch, a granddaughter of Walter E. Poor, founder of the Sylvania Electric Company, in 1991.

Burden died on October 10, 1984.

=== Legacy ===
In 1971, together with his mother and brother, he donated Burden Auditorium to Harvard Business School in honor of his father, William A. M. Burden Sr., who graduated from Harvard in 1900, and his son, William A. M. Burden III, who graduated from Harvard in 1953 and Harvard Business School in 1955, both of whom died young. The hall was designed by Lincoln Center architect Philip Johnson.

His estate in Mount Kisco, New York was later purchased and subdivided in the 2000s.

His granddaughter, Wendy Burden, wrote a memoir entitled Dead End Gene Pool about her family, including her grandfather William, who in the waning years of his life “had a bathroom and dressing room lined with two inches of foam to avoid bruising himself. Once, while visiting Paris, he had a private secretary in New York order seven new Mercedes-Benzes — one to be delivered within a few hours."

After his death, in 1985 his widow donated "eleven masterworks" from his estate to the Museum of Modern Art. Paintings included:

Image	Artist	Title	Year
Link	Jean Arp	Ptolemy	1953
Link	Constantin Brâncuși	Young Bird	1928
Link	Constantin Brâncuși	Bird in Space	1941
Link	Robert Delaunay	The Three Windows, the Tower and the Wheel	1912
Link	Arshile Gorky	Diary of a Seducer	1945
Link	Piet Mondrian	Trafalgar Square	1939-43
	Claude Monet	Corona (Water Lilies)	c. 1920
Link	Pablo Picasso	Two Acrobats with a Dog	1905
Link	Pablo Picasso	Still Life with Red Bull's Head	1938
	Pablo Picasso	Mirror and Cherries	1947
Link	Georges-Pierre Seurat	The Channel at Gravelines, Evening	1890

== Published works ==
- The Struggle for Airways in Latin America (1943), Council on Foreign Relations.
- Peggy and I: A Life Too Busy For a Dull Moment (1982) 345 pp.

Diplomatic posts
Preceded by John Clifford Folger	U.S. Ambassador to Belgium; 1959 – 1961	Succeeded by Douglas MacArthur II
