= James A. Burden Jr. =

American industrialist (1871–1932)

- 1914 portrait
- Born: James Abercrombie Burden Jr. January 16, 1871; Manhattan, New York, U.S
- Died: June 1, 1932 (aged 61); Syosset, New York, U.S
- Education: Harvard College; Harvard Law School
- Occupation: Industrialist
- Employer: Burden Iron Works
- Spouse: Florence Adele Sloane (m. 1895)
- Children: 3
- Relatives: Arthur Scott Burden (brother); Henry Burden (grandfather); William Fletcher Burden (uncle); Richard Irvin (grandfather); I. Townsend Burden (uncle)

James Abercrombie Burden Jr. (January 16, 1871 – June 1, 1932) was an American industrialist from New York.

== Early life ==
James Abercrombie Burden Jr. was born on January 16, 1871, in Manhattan New York. His parents were James Abercrombie Burden Sr. and Mary Proudfit (née Irvin). Burden's younger brother, Arthur Scott Burden, was the first husband of Cynthia Roche.

His maternal grandfather was merchant Richard Irvin and his paternal grandfather, Henry Burden, a native of Scotland, became manager in 1822 of Troy Iron and Nail Works reorganized later as the "Henry Burden and Sons" foundry in Troy. His grandfather assumed full ownership in 1848, which was passed along to his sons, and in 1881 was reorganized as Burden Iron Works.

== Career ==
Photograph of Burden, by Arnold Genthe, 1914

Burden attended and graduated from Harvard College in 1893. Following his graduation, he studied for a year at Harvard Law School before going to work at the family company in 1894 and assuming the presidency in 1906 upon his father's death.

Burden inherited a share of the Burden Iron Works from his uncle, William Fletcher Burden, who died at the age of 38 in 1867. Burden Iron Works became the largest horseshoe and nail‐producing concern in the world. In 1910, then Democratic candidate, and eventually, New York Governor, John A. Dix spoke in Troy about the burden of overtaxation. Dix was then hosted for dinner by James, a Republican who had recently announced his intention to support the Democratic nominee.

In 1921, as a result of two horse fall injuries his brother, Arthur, sustained which caused him to be placed under constant care from late 1913, Burden filed a petition while his sister-in-law, Cynthia Roche's, was away in London, requesting that Arthur Burden be declared incompetent. His brother died from pneumonia shortly thereafter in June 1921.

At the time of his death in 1932, he was president of Burden Iron Works. In 1940, after his death, the company was purchased by Republic Steel.

=== Society life ===
As a wedding gift for Burden and his bride, his father-in-law commissioned Warren & Wetmore to design and build a residence at 7 East 91st Street on Carnegie Hill in New York City. Burden was a trustee of the Woodside Presbyterian Church and was a member of the Knickerbocker Club, Metropolitan Club, Racquet and Tennis Club, India House of New York City and Meadowbrook Club of Long Island.

== Personal life ==
Photograph of Burden and his sons, James and William, by Arnold Genthe, 1914

On June 6, 1895, Burden married Florence Adele Sloane, who was the eldest daughter of William D. Sloane (the head of W. & J. Sloane) and Emily Thorn Vanderbilt, a granddaughter of Cornelius Vanderbilt. The couple were wed at Trinity Episcopal Church in Lenox, Massachusetts. Together, they were the parents of three children:

- James Abercrombie Burden III (1897–1979), who married Elizabeth Leahe.
- William Douglas Burden (1898–1978), a founder of Marineland in Florida who married three times. The first was to Catherine C. White in 1924. His first and second marriages both ended in divorce. He married for the third and final time to Jeanne Wells Wight (1922–1995).
- Florence Irvin "Sheila" Burden (1902–1990), who married Blake Leigh Lawrence (1898–1986) in 1929.

In 1931, he was injured in a fall. Burden died on June 1, 1932, of an embolism as a consequence of his fall a year earlier. His widow married Richard M. Tobin on July 6, 1936. In 1938, the contents of the James A. Burden House were auctioned by Parke-Bernet.

== See also ==
- Vanderbilt family
