= I. Townsend Burden =

American industrialist (1838–1913)

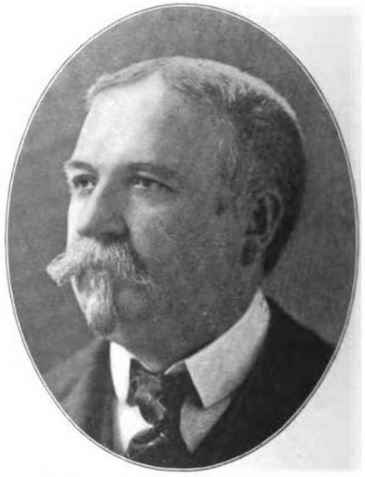
- Born: Isaiah Townsend Burden; February 21, 1838; Troy, New York
- Died: April 23, 1913 (aged 75); Manhattan, New York
- Education: Russell's Academy
- Spouse: Evelyn Byrd Moale (m. 1871)
- Children: 4
- Parent(s): Henry Burden; Helen McOuat
- Relatives: William A. M. Burden Sr. (son); William Fletcher Burden (brother); James A. Burden Jr. (nephew); Shirley Carter Burden (grandson); William A. M. Burden (grandson)

Isaiah Townsend Burden (February 21, 1838 – April 23, 1913) was a prominent American member of New York Society during the Gilded Age.

== Early life ==
Burden was born February 21, 1838, in Troy, New York, the fifth son of Helen (née McOuat) (1802–1860) and Henry Burden (1791–1871), the founder of Burden Iron Works. His siblings were Peter Abercrombie Burden (1822–1866), Margaret Elizabeth Burden (1824–1915), Helen Burden (1826–1891), Henry James Burden (1828–1846), William Fletcher Burden (1830–1867), James Abercrombie Burden (1833–1906), and Jessie Burden (1840–1917).

Burden received a public school education and completed studies at Russell's Academy, a private academy in New Haven, Connecticut.

== Career ==
Following his studies, at age 19, he began working for his father's company, Burden Iron Works. His father was known as the "Ironmaster of Troy." The company was reorganized in 1881, ten years after his father's death, and he became an almost 50% owner, with his brother James A. Burden, until his death in 1913. After his brother James's death in 1906, his nephew, James A. Burden Jr., became more heavily involved in the company.

He also served as president of Port Huron Iron Company and was one of the organizers of the Knickerbocker Trust Co. of New York, of which he held a large ownership interest. He was also a trustee of the Lake Champlain and Moriah Railroad Company, and president of Bailey's Beach in Newport.

=== Society life ===
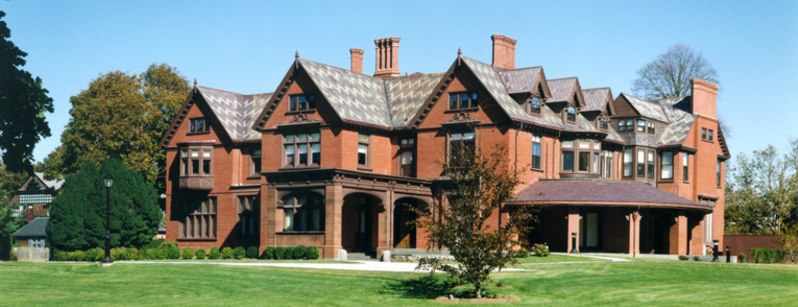
"Fairlawn," in Newport, 1852.

Burden and his wife were members of the infamous "Four Hundred" of New York Society, as dictated by Caroline Schermerhorn Astor and Ward McAllister and published in The New York Times on February 16, 1892. His wife was credited with introducing Harry Lehr to high society at their home in Newport. He was also a member of the Union Club, the Newport Casino, and was President of the Spouting Rock Beach Association of Newport.

He purchased former Vice President of the United States and New York Governor Levi P. Morton's residence, designed by Seth C. Bradford and built in 1852–1853. The home was known as "Fairlawn" and was located on Bellevue Avenue in Newport, Rhode Island. In 1870, Morton had Richard Morris Hunt, designer of Ochre Court, add a ballroom to the house for a visit by Ulysses S. Grant shortly after he became president. In 1881, McKim, Mead and White designed family rooms on the second floor over the ballroom and added Tiffany & Co. stained glass windows to the Great Hall. When Burden bought the home from Morton in 1900, he commissioned Peabody and Stearns to add a curved porch. After his death, the home was passed to his children.

== Personal life ==
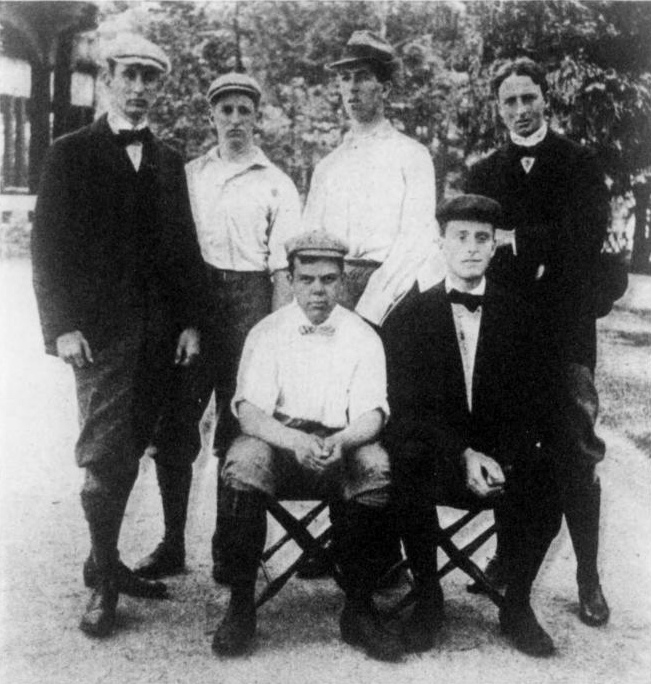
His eldest son, I. T. Burden Jr. (second from left in the back row), while on the Harvard Golf Team, 1897

On April 18, 1871, he was married to Evelyn Byrd Moale (1847–1916), a daughter of William Armistead Moale (1800–1880) of Baltimore, Maryland, who was a descendant of the Carter and Byrd families of Virginia. Her sister Judith Carter Moale was married to Robert Livingston Cutting Jr., a prominent banker. Together, they were the parents of four children:

- Evelyn Byrd Burden (1874–1968), who did not marry.
- Isaiah Townsend Burden Jr. (1875–1953), who married Florence Sheedy (1888–1949) of Denver in June 1911.
- William Armistead Moale Burden Sr. (1877–1909), who married Florence Vanderbilt Twombly (1881–1969), a daughter of Florence Adele Vanderbilt Twombly and Hamilton McKown Twombly, in 1904.
- Gwendolyn Townsend Burden (1884–1935), who married David Dows (1885–1966) in December 1911.

Burden died on April 23, 1913. Following his death, he was buried at the Albany Rural Cemetery in Menands, New York.

=== Descendants ===
Through his son William, he was the paternal grandfather of William Armistead Moale Burden Jr. (1906–1984), a banker who served as U.S. Ambassador to Belgium from 1959 to 1961, and Shirley Carter Burden (1908–1989), a prominent photographer.
