= John Folger =

John Folger may refer to:

- John Hamlin Folger (1880–1963), U.S. congressman from North Carolina
- John Clifford Folger (1893–1981), American diplomat
