= Woodside Presbyterian Church =

- Postcard depicting the church. The building at the left, is the manse, which no longer exists.

- Location within New York
- Former names: CAC Woodside
- Alternative names: The Post Contemporary

General information
- Status: Completed
- Location: Troy, NY, 71 Mill Street, Troy NY 12180
- Coordinates: 42.705150°N 73.691403°W
- Current tenants: The Post Contemporary

Woodside Presbyterian Church was built for Henry Burden, owner of the Burden Iron Works, on land owned by Erastus Corning, of Corning's Albany Iron Works, as part of an apparent reconciliation between these two often-feuding 19th century industrial giants.

== History ==
The church complex is located in South Troy, New York and comprises two buildings: the original Church built in 1869, and a Chapel built in 1883. The site is adjacent to Wynantskill Creek and the Burden Water Wheel.

The stone church building was designed by architect Henry Dudley and erected in 1869 as a memorial to the wife of Henry Burden, who died in 1860. In her life, she was concerned for the iron workers and their families, who had to walk miles in inclement weather to churches in downtown Troy and wished for a church closer to the Iron Works. An inscription on the church wall reads, "Woodside Memorial Church, dedicated to the service of the Triune God, has been erected to the memory of Helen Burden by her husband, Henry Burden, in accordance with her long-cherished and earnest desire, 1869."

The later-built stone chapel was almost certainly designed by Robert Robertson, one of the Burden family's favorite architects, and was likely used by the Sunday school. The chapel was built by the children of Henry Burden, Margaret Burden Proudfit, James A Burden, and I. Townsend Burden, after his death in 1871. It was built in memory of the many children lost to the three of them. An inscription on the wall of the chapel building reads, "Woodside Chapel. Erected A. D. 1883, by Margaret E. Proudfit, James A. Burden, and I. Townsend Burden, in memory of their children."

The First Presbyterian Church of Troy, New York on 11 March 1866 organized “The Mission Sunday School at the Nail factory” which met at Mechanic's Hall on Mill Street. About 100 were enrolled and divided into 15 classes with Mr. Ira Travell as Superintendent, within a year enrollment exceeded 200 and was divided into 28 classes.

The interest in Sunday School was so great, that a committee was formed to pursue the matter of a Church for the “citizens of the Troy Iron Works”. About a year later, 19 June 1867, the Troy Presbytery organized the South Presbyterian Church with 29 members meeting at Mechanic's Hall. Then followed a vigorous campaign to secure land for a church site and a suitable church building. The ground upon which the church now stands was a gift from Mr. Erastus Corning and Mr. J.F. Winslow, heads of the Corning and Winslow Steel Works. Then in 1868, construction of the Sanctuary began. Erected at a cost of $75000.00, it was the third most expensive church edifice in Troy at the time.

The Sanctuary was the gift of Mr. Henry Burden, who was the well known inventor of the first machine for producing horseshoes. Mr. Burden came to this county from Scotland and had created the large and prosperous Burden Iron Works. The Machinery was powered by the world-famous water wheel, designed by Mr. Burden and built on a ravine of the Wynants-Kill opposite the site of where this new church was being constructed. The Corner Stone was laid on 16 September 1868 and at the time the congregation voted to change the name of the church to Woodside Presbyterian Church. “Woodside” being the name of the Burden Estate, located on the hill, on the opposite side of Wynants-Kill. The dedicatory service was held on 15 July 1869, and on the inner wall of the church, a tablet was placed bearing the inscription: “Woodside Memorial Church, dedicated to the service of the Triune of God, has been erected to the memory of Helen Burden by her husband, Henry Burden, in accordance with her long cherished wishes and earnest desire. 1869”

A central feature in the sanctuary, and installed during the construction of the building was the massive tracker organ (in July 2004 the organ was purchased and removed by the Rainbow Mennonite Church of Kansas City, KS). The organ, opus 488, an E.& G.G. Hook of Boston, with its keyboard linked to individual pipes by an intricate system of thin wooden rods was built by Elias and George Greenleaf Hook of Tremont Street, Boston and installed in 1869. The organ featured two manuals, 3 divisions, 19 stops, 16 registers, 17 ranks and a total of 876 pipes. Elias was responsible for the technical design of the instruments as well as the business side of the firm; George was responsible for the voicing of the instruments, and was himself an organist.

In the Church's tower, on the fourth floor is a set of nine bells which are rung by means of hand-operated levers which are located on the second floor of the tower. These bells were cast at the famous Meneely bell foundry of West Troy (now Watervliet), New York, in 1869. That bell foundry was started in 1826 by Andrew Meneely, who had been an apprentice to instrument maker and bell founder Julius Hanks. It is not to be confused with the second Meneely bell foundry, which was located in Troy, New York; the two bell foundries competed fiercely.

Meneely bells rang for President Franklin Roosevelt's and President John Kennedy's funerals, and for President Lyndon Johnson's inauguration. The replacement for the Liberty Bell in Philadelphia, as well as many church bells in that city, were Meneely bells. Nearly every church bell in Troy, New York is a Meneely bell. Other Meneely bells include bells at Cornell University, the Metropolitan Life building in New York City, and the West Point Military Academy. Overall, the Meneely companies produced about 65,000 bells. The Meneely companies eventually closed in 1952 owing to metal shortages and the increasing popularity of electronic bells and chimes.

On the third floor of the tower are clock works manufactured by A. S. Hotchkiss and purchased through Browne & Spaulding of New York. This clock strikes the quarter-hour using the Warren chime tune, and was operational into the 1960s until neighbors started complaining and the clock was shut down.

In 1883, an admirably appointed Sunday School building in the same style of architecture was erected on the East side of the church. A tablet within states “Erected A.D. 1883 by Margaret E. Proudfit, James A. Burden, I. Townsend Burden, in memory of their children” This is why it is called “Proudfit Chapel” and a place of worship after the Church was closed in September 2002 due to Structural failures in the West wall of the church. Proudfit Chapel was damaged by fire on 23 February 1907 and was immediately restored.

After the death of Henry Burden on 19 January 1871, his surviving children erected to his memory on the West side of the church a spacious and appointed Manse. Mr. and Mrs. Arthur Teal and children where the last to live in the Manse. Upon Mrs. Marion Kendall Teal's death in 1973, a decision was made to demolish the building due to upkeep and cost to modernize it. A modern Manse had been built on Williams Road in North Greenbush and was eventually sold to Hudson Valley Community College in 1972. Henry Burden requested to be buried in Albany Rural Cemetery at a spot where he could overlook the church, and so it was done.

In 1869 and 1870, there were controversies over music used during the worship, such not having an anthem by the choir, not having the congregation singing and noisy demonstrations on the organ after the benediction. This was all solved, as the subject of music was no longer in the Session record after 1871.

In 1877 there was the “Wine Controversy”, where a couple would not participate in the Lord's Supper because their consciences would not allow them to touch the cup containing fermented wine. The Troy Presbytery would not get involved as they said it was to be decided by the Session. By 1895 the General Assembly ruled that a local church could choose fermented or unfermented wine, in 1912, Woodside began using individual cups, and in 1915 began using grape juice.

Woodside was also noted for their suppers. Turkey, Fresh Ham and Strawberry Festivals. Before the present kitchen was built by congregation member and contractor Ward F. Mack, the kitchen was located on the lower level of the chapel and the food brought up to the main floor via a Dumb Waiter which still exists today. During the time it was permissible, Woodside would produce Minstrel Shows on the stage in Proudfit Chapel and they were well attended.

=== 2000s ===
Woodside has been involved in many mission projects. Reverend Margaret E. Howland established the South End Summer Day Program, which was eventually taken over by Hudson Valley Community College, but now no longer exists. Reverend Mosher introduced Woodside to the Neighborhood Shack in West Virginia where gifts would be sent at Christmas. Woodside took turns providing meals for Joseph's House in Troy.

During the Reverend Howland's ministry, Woodside was part of a Shared Ministry with Jermain Presbyterian Church in Watervliet, Loudonville Presbyterian Church and Bethany Presbyterian Church in Menands. During this time, all the churches sponsored exchange students from Scotland, home of Henry Burden. This program continued for 4 years, 1970 – 1973, with students from these four churches going to Scotland for the summer. Woodside left the shared ministry when the Reverend Wheeler became part-time pastor of both Woodside and the Presbyterian Church in Rensselaer.

On Sunday, September 1, 2002, upon members arriving for Sunday worship, it was discovered that a portion of the West Gable of the church had collapsed. Worship was moved to Proudfit Chapel. The City of Troy would not allow services to continue in the church due to the severity and risk of further collapse. A claim was made with the churches insurance company for repairs and was turned down. A lawyer was hired, if sued, Woodside would either not receive enough money to make the repairs, or lose the case entirely. At that sad point serious thought was given to the future of Woodside Presbyterian Church.

A Congregational Meeting was held on Sunday November 11, 2003, and it was voted 15 yes, and 2 no, to concur with the Session to dissolve the congregation and Woodside Presbyterian Church effective 31 December 2003. The major reasons for this decision were decline in member attendance, reduction of finances, and resignation of both the Pastor, and Organist effective 31 October 2003. They both agreed after the vote to stay on until the end.

On Sunday 28 December 2003, the last Sunday of the year, the closing services were held at 4:00 PM in Proudfit Chapel. In attendance was the Reverend David C. Jamison (Pastor from 1959 to 1963), The Reverend Margaret E. Howland (Pastor 1968–1977), The Reverend Daniel J. Wheeler (Pastor 1977–1983), The Reverend Leif Erickson (Pastor 1984–1992), and the Last and Final Pastor, the Reverend James C. Mosher (1986–2003). The Reverend Cass Shaw was also in attendance from the Presbytery of Albany. At the closing of the service, the Reverend Shaw, Charged and Ordered the Clerk of the Session, to Dissolve the Congregation, and, the Great Woodside Presbyterian Church. The long time devoted remaining members wanted to stay on “The Hill” until the day the church died, if, they in fact, did not die first...

“ When God creates anything, he has a purpose for it, and, when it has accomplished that purpose, in God’s sight, the church has completed its work.”

In a process aided by the Hudson-Mohawk Industrial Gateway, the church was reclaimed by the Burden and Corning Heirs in 2005 due to a reverter clause in the original deed. Soon after, the Burden heirs bought the Corning's share.

The church was purchased in 2007 by the Contemporary Artists Center, a non-profit arts organization. On September 19, 2015, the site is renamed to The Post Contemporary

== Timeline ==
- March 10, 1860: Helen Burden dies; Henry Burden announces plans to build church at her funeral
- July 15, 1869: Church building is completed and first service is held
- January 19, 1871: Henry Burden dies of heart disease
- January 23, 1871: Funeral for Henry Burden at Woodside
- 1871: Henry Burden's surviving children constructed a manse to honor their father
- 1883: “Proudfit Chapel” Building is completed
- February 23, 1907: Chapel building burns in large fire, but is quickly rebuilt by original contractor
- 1974: Manse was demolished
- September 1, 2002: It was discovered that the west gable of the church had collapsed. Worship was moved to Proudfit Chapel
- November 11, 2003: Congregational Meeting voted to dissolve the congregation at Woodside
- December 28, 2003: Albany Presbytery ceases to use the church
- 2005: Corning and Burden Heirs are awarded ownership
- 2007: Contemporary Artists Center purchases church
- September 19, 2015: Contemporary Artists Center at Woodside is renamed to The Post Contemporary
