= David Rosengarten =

American chef, author and television personality

- Born: January 25, 1950 (age 76); New York City, U.S.
- Education: Colgate University; Cornell University
- Occupations: Chef, food writer, television, online personality
- Spouse: Constance Childs (married 1983)
- Children: Andrea and Sarah (daughters); Bjorn (son)

David Rosengarten (born January 25, 1950) is an American chef, author and television personality, who hosted or co-hosted more than 2500 television shows on the Food Network from 1994 to 2001.

== Personal life ==
Rosengarten was born in New York City to Leonard Rosengarten, a garment industry executive, and Lorraine Stein. He married Constance Childs on October 15, 1983, in a wedding catered by Martha Stewart. His wife is the granddaughter of photographer Shirley Burden and actress Flobelle Fairbanks, who was a niece of actor Douglas Fairbanks. She is also a descendant of Cornelius Vanderbilt through her mother, who is a great-granddaughter of Florence Adele Vanderbilt Twombly and the last surviving granddaughter of the Vanderbilt family's patriarch. His two daughters, Andrea and Sarah, appeared frequently on Rosengarten's Food Network cooking show, which he named Taste. His son, Bjorn Rosengarten-Bowser, has appeared on Martha Stewart's collaborative Emeril's Table cooking show as well as working behind the scenes for Patti LaBelle TV series Patti LaBelle's Place, regularly at The View on ABC, with recent Production Assistant work for Paramount/MTV while working towards his Berklee College of Music Boston B.A. Degree in Sound Engineering & Production.

Rosengarten attended Colgate University in Hamilton, New York where he earned a B.A. degree in 1971. He holds a doctorate in dramatic literature from Cornell University (1980) in Ithaca, New York, and was an assistant professor of theater at Skidmore College in Saratoga Springs, New York.

== Print ==
Rosengarten was a contributing editor for Gourmet Magazine from 1995 to 1999, and was that magazine's New York restaurant critic. He published articles in several US newspapers including The New York Times, the New York Daily News, and The New York Observer, and he was the weekly wine columnist of Newsday.

Other magazines and web sites for whom he has written include Food & Wine, Bon Appetit, Harper's Bazaar, Departures, The Wine Spectator, Wine & Spirits, and The Wine Enthusiast; he writes for Saveur, the Huffington Post, and Forbes. From 2001 to 2007, Rosengarten wrote and published The Rosengarten Report, which in 2003 won a James Beard Award for "best food and wine newsletter." At its height, The Rosengarten Report had 50,000 paid subscribers.

=== Books ===
- David Rosengarten Entertains: Fabulous Parties for Food Lovers (with Joshua Wesson) (2004) Wiley ISBN 0-471-46198-9
- The Dean & DeLuca Cookbook (1996), Random House ISBN 0-679-77003-8
- It's All American Food: The Best Recipes for More Than 400 New American Classics (2003) Little, Brown and Company ISBN 0-316-05315-5.
- Red Wine with Fish: The New Art of Matching Wine with Food (with Joshua Wesson) (1989), Simon & Schuster ISBN 0-671-66208-2
- Taste: One Palate's Journey through the World's Greatest Dishes (1998), Television Food Network, Random House ISBN 0-375-75265-X

== Television ==
Rosengarten's first hosting opportunity on the US channel Food Network was Food News & Views. He then created and hosted the program Taste, which premiered in February 1994 and ran for eight years on the Food Network, and co-hosted In Food Today with Donna Hanover He has also appeared frequently on NBC's Today show.

Entertainment Weekly had the following to say about Taste:

"Call it culinary voyeurism, but Taste is a cooking show even take-out addicts will find enthralling. David Rosengarten's orgasmic ruminations on 'lobster synergy' and the textural differences between Lebanese and Portuguese pine nuts will give 'bring to a boil' a whole new meaning."

In the middle of 2012, Rosengarten created a YouTube channel, RosengartenTV.

== Travel ==
Since October 2006, Rosengarten has been organizing and hosting food tours in regions such as the Mediterranean, India and Iceland.
