= Sea Change (Northeast Harbor, Maine) =

Historic summer estate In Northeast Harbor, Maine

- U.S. National Register of Historic Places
- U.S. Historic district
- Location within Maine Location within the United States
- Location: 27 Corning Way, Northeast Harbor, Maine
- Coordinates: 44°17′13″N 68°16′51″W
- Area: 3.5 acres (1.4 ha)
- Built: 1945
- Architect: Harrison, Walter K.; et al.
- Architectural style: International Style, Shingle Style
- NRHP reference No.: 08000991
- Added to NRHP: August 7, 2009

Sea Change is a historic summer estate at 27 Corning Way in Northeast Harbor, Maine. Its main house is an International style structure, originally built in 1940 to a design by Wallace K. Harrison in collaboration with Isamu Noguchi, and rebuilt from the original plans in 2005 after a fire destroyed the original. Outbuildings on the property include three once-detached Shingle style cabins and a carriage house (now converted to a caretaker's quarters), all built in the late 19th century by Erastus Corning. The most unusual structure on the property is a large reinforced concrete bomb shelter, built in 1961–62 to design by William F. Pedersen. The property was listed on the National Register of Historic Places in 2009, for its exceptional collection of modern architecture, including the Cold War-era bunker and a rare Harrison design located outside New York.

== Description and history ==
Sea Change is located just east of the tip of Sargent Head, a small peninsula jutting south from the larger peninsula of Mount Desert Island on which Northeast Harbor is located. The entire Sargent's Head area was acquired in the late 19th century by Erastus Corning, a prominent Albany, New York businessman and politician, and it was his family that first developed what became known as “Sea Change”. At that time it was known as Stony Point. In the 1880s they built a handsome Shingle style estate house, on Sargent Head and a carriage house at one end of his property, at the location of the future “Sea Change”. Erastus gave his son Edwin the land with the carriage house. Edwin enlisted architect Fred Savage to design a main house and three cabins that he called “sleeping pavilions”. It was reminiscent of an Adirondack style compound at lakeside. This portion of the Corning property was sold in 1939 to William A. M. Burden, a scion of the Vanderbilt family and longtime president of the Museum of Modern Art. The Burdens named their newly acquired property “Sea Change” after a line sung by the spirit Ariel in Shakespeare's “The Tempest” The Burdens disassembled the Corning's main house (of which parts were reused by the Cornings for a more modest house on the remaining land), and commissioned New York City architect Wallace K. Harrison and sculptor Isamu Noguchi to design an International Style house as a replacement, which was completed in 1947. Harrison's design was a structure that was scaled to harmonize with the remaining existing buildings, using their footprints and massing as a guide in designing portions of the house, and integrating them into what became a large indoor-outdoor living space.

The interiors of the cabins were renovated incorporating materials used in the main house and adding a bathroom for each bedroom. In the 1950s Burden retained William F. Pedersen to redesign the interior of one of the three cabins. Pedersen was an architect who worked under Wallace Harrison and eventually began his own firm. Pedersen's most unusual contribution to the complex, however, is the reinforced concrete bomb shelter, which Burden ordered designs for after return from Belgium after a stint as United States Ambassador to Belgium. Burden had for many years consulted for the United States government on military matters, including nuclear weapons and ballistic missile technology, and was undoubtedly aware of Soviet advances in those areas. The first designs for the shelter are dated September 21, 1961; the Soviet Union detonated a hydrogen bomb the following October. It consists of a large central chamber from which two hallways radiate; it has a sleeping capacity of 24.

In 1999 the main house suffered severe fire damage. An extensive and comprehensive restoration was completed in 2005 using the original plans, under the guidance of architect Heinrich Herman and family member Jean E. P. Burden, restoring virtually all of the interior and exterior features and furnishings. The only changes were the provision of more modern kitchen appliances, and updates to the mechanical and electrical systems related to safety codes.

== See also ==
- National Register of Historic Places listings in Hancock County, Maine
