= William Fletcher Burden =

American businessman (1830–1867)

- Born: March 14, 1830; Troy, New York, U.S.
- Died: December 7, 1867 (aged 37); Troy, New York, U.S.
- Education: Troy Polytechnic Institute
- Spouse: Julia Ann Hart (m. 1856)
- Children: 4
- Parent(s): Henry Burden; Helen McOuat
- Relatives: I. Townsend Burden (brother); James A. Burden Jr. (nephew); Arthur Scott Burden (nephew); Irvin McDowell (brother-in-law)

William Fletcher Burden (March 14, 1830 – December 7, 1867) was an industrialist born in Troy, New York.

== Early life ==
William F. Burden was born March 14, 1830, in Troy, New York, the third son of Henry Burden (1791–1871) and Helen (née McOuat) Burden (1802–1860). His siblings included James Abercrombie Burden Sr. (the father of James A. Burden Jr. and Arthur Scott Burden), Margaret Elizabeth Burden, Helen Burden (who married Gen. Irvin McDowell), Henry James Burden, Peter Abercrombie Burden, Isaiah Townsend Burden, and Jessie Burden.

Burden attended Troy Polytechnic Institute (later known as Rensselaer Polytechnic Institute).

== Career ==
William designed the steam derricks, used for unloading coal, at the Burden Iron Works. A wire cable stretched between, on which an iron carriage traveled three hundred feet from the dock to the coal heap, carrying a self-dumping bucket with the capacity to hold a ton of coal. A steam engine hoisted the filled bucket to the cable, along which it traveled to the point where the tilting apparatus overturned its contents upon the pile.

== Personal life ==
In 1856, he married Julia Ann Hart (1833–1887), daughter of Hon. Richard P. Hart from Troy. Together, they were the parents of five sons, only three of which survived to adulthood:

- William Fletcher Burden, Jr. (1856–1897), who married Esther "Daisy" (née McCoy) (1855–1928).
- Howard Hart Burden (1857–1926).
- Henry Burden (1861–1861), who died young.
- Henry Burden (1863–1864), who also died young.
- Henry Burden (1866-1937), moved to Cazenovia, NY. Married Julia Radcliffe Hart Burden.

Burden died in Troy on December 7, 1867, at the age of thirty-seven, and was interred in the family vault in the Albany Rural Cemetery. After his death, the iron works were inherited by his nephew, James A. Burden Jr. A memorial plaque dedicated to William Fletcher Burden is in the Woodside Church, Troy, New York.
