= Florham =

Building in Madison, New Jersey, United States

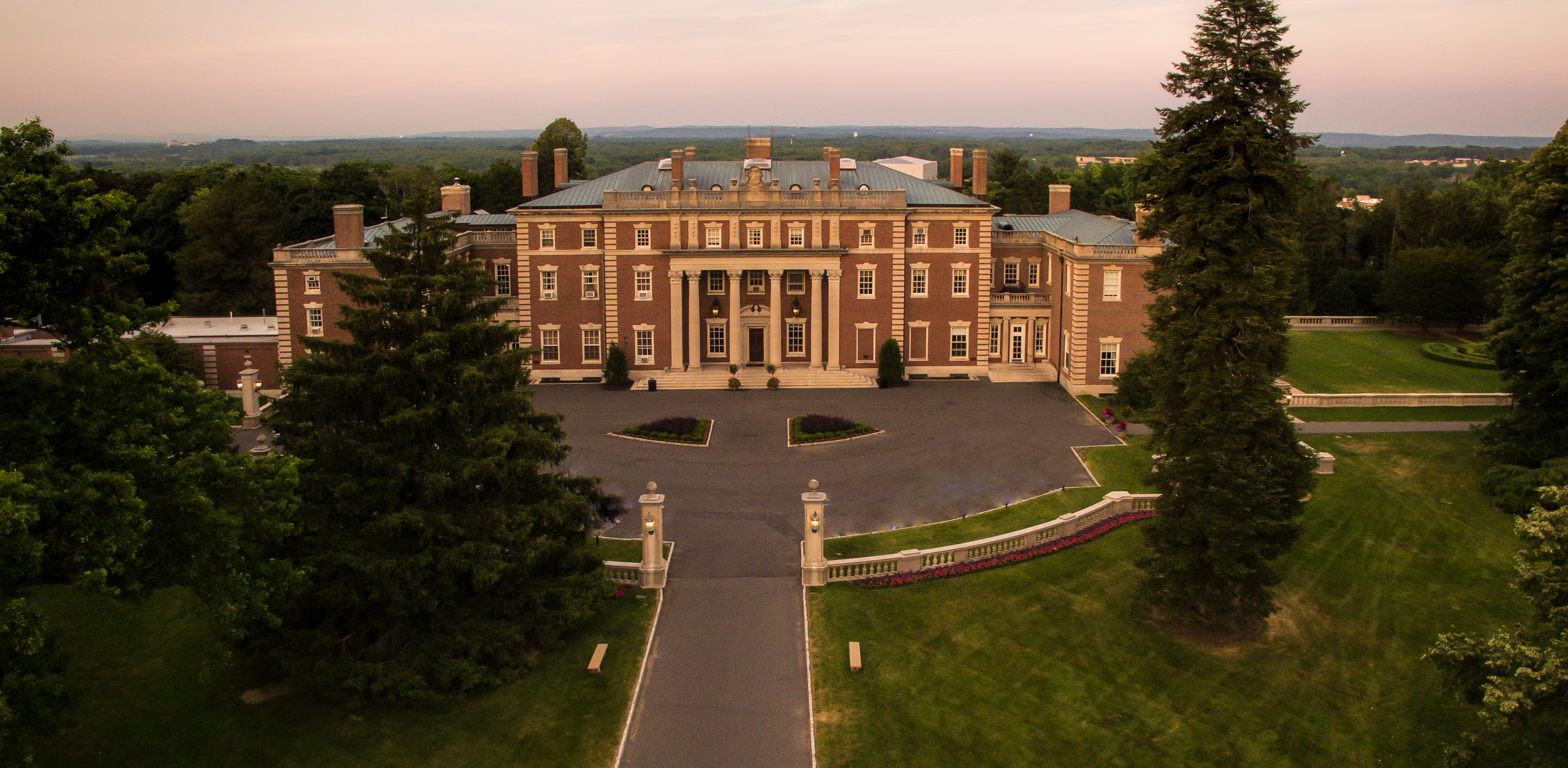
- The mansion at Florham, now the centerpiece of Fairleigh Dickinson University
- Interactive map of the Florham area

General information
- Architectural style: English Baroque Revival
- Location: 285 Madison Avenue, Madison, New Jersey 07940
- Coordinates: 40.775726°N 74.431028°W
- Completed: 1899
- Owner: Fairleigh Dickinson University

Design and construction
- Architecture firm: McKim, Mead & White
- Other designers: Frederick Law Olmsted, Thomas Edison

Other information
- Number of rooms: 110

Florham is a former Vanderbilt estate that is located in Madison and Florham Park, in Morris County, New Jersey. It was built during the 1890s for Hamilton McKown Twombly and his wife, Florence Adele Vanderbilt, a member of the Vanderbilt family. Now part of the Florham Campus of Fairleigh Dickinson University, the Georgian Revival mansion is one of the ten largest houses in the United States.

The name of the estate is a portmanteau of their first names, Florence and Hamilton.

== Early history ==
Florham's history can be divided into two parts: the establishment of the estate by the family during the Gilded Age, and the 'consecration' of the estate from a temporal use to an intellectual use as the home of Fairleigh Dickinson University.

=== Building Florham ===
Florham was built between 1893 and 1899 by Florence Adele Vanderbilt and her husband, Hamilton McKown Twombly, to be the couple's country estate. Florence, the youngest and favorite grandchild of the transportation tycoon Cornelius Vanderbilt, married Twombly in 1877 after meeting him at the two families' summering spots in Newport, Rhode Island.

In 1893, the couple commissioned the famous firm of McKim, Mead & White (the architects of the Old Penn Station and the Rhode Island State House) to build Florham as the country setting to raise their family. The architects' instructions were to build "a house on the order of an English country gentleman ... a thoroughly comfortable house, without the stiffness of the modern city house." Beginning in 1891, some 1,200 acres (490 ha) were acquired in 37 purchases to assemble a property on Madison's "millionaire's row", a neighborhood that was home to several other Gilded Age estates belonging to the Rockefellers, Dodges and Mellons.

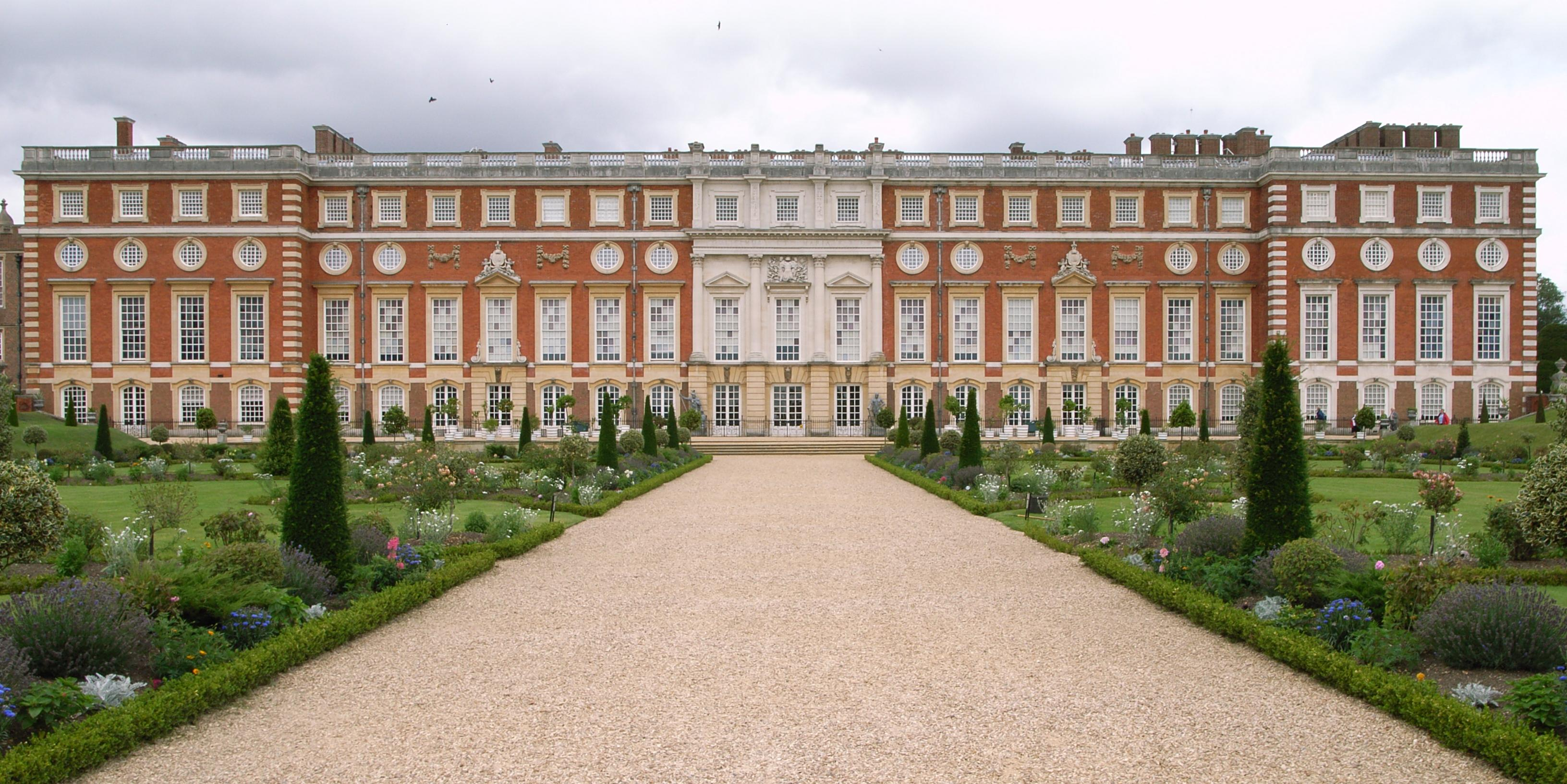
The Wren wing of Hampton Court Palace, the inspiration for Florham

With 110 rooms, McKim, Mead & White designed what remains today as one of the ten largest houses in the United States. Florham's design was principally inspired by Sir Christopher Wren's late 17th-century expansion of Hampton Court Palace under King William III and Queen Mary II, evident especially in the house's lay-out, pillars, and contrasting stone and red brick. The furnishing of the house's interior, overseen mainly by Stanford White, included several Barberini tapestries, a Louis XV ballroom and several Renaissance fireplaces purchased from noble Italian homes. Another famous New Jerseyian, Thomas Edison, whose initial electrical projects were supported by the joint effort of Twombly and J.P. Morgan, personally designed the mansion's heating system and boiler in a tunnel system beneath the house.

The estate also included vast greenhouses, including an orangery which still stands today as part of Fairleigh Dickinson University's library, a dairy farm, stables, gatehouse and carriage house. The celebrated architect of New York's Central Park, Frederick Law Olmsted, was commissioned as the 'landscape architect' of the estate, designing the Italianate gardens that survive today. Olmsted also designed other Vanderbilt estates, including Biltmore. Setting the site of the mansion on a hill overlooking the Passaic Valley and Black Brook meadows, Olmsted told Twombly "You have a sweep of landscape to an infinitely remote and perspectively obscure background ... as much so as if you owned the state of New Jersey."

Between the purchase of the land, the construction of the mansion, greenhouses, stables, and farm, and the furnishing of the mansion, the cost of the entire estate came to about $5 million (equivalent to $193.5 million in 2025). McKim, Mead and White also brought over 600 laborers and families from Italy to build and later work on the estate — especially as rose cultivators. This community founded the base for Madison's large Italian community.

The family, though often in New York or Newport, spent a majority of its time at Florham and developed a relationship with the local community. The family were all members of Grace Episcopal Church in Madison, which was restored in Florence's memory in 1952. The Grace Episcopal Church Boychoir, well known and admired in the area, sang annually at the estate, when it was treated to a lavish Christmas feast with full wait-staff.

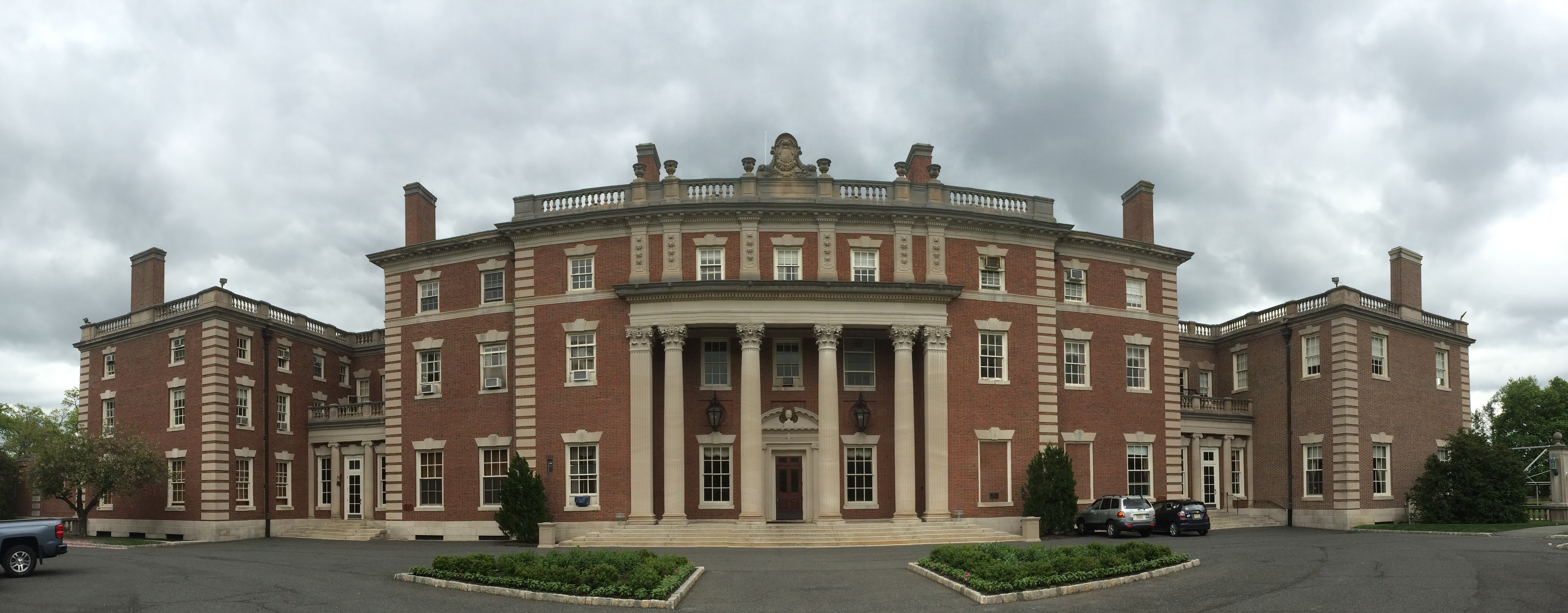
Florham

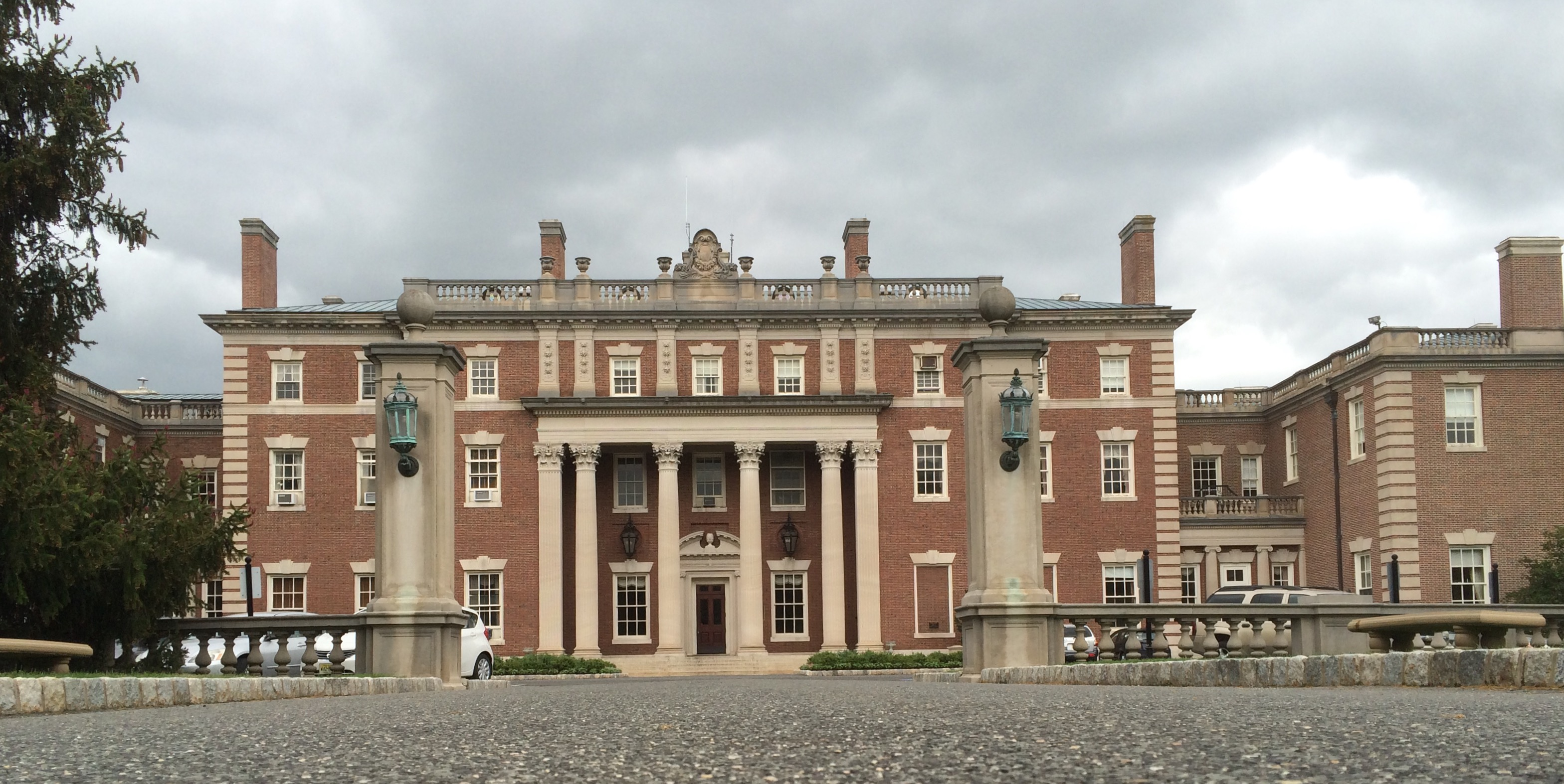
Front of the mansion

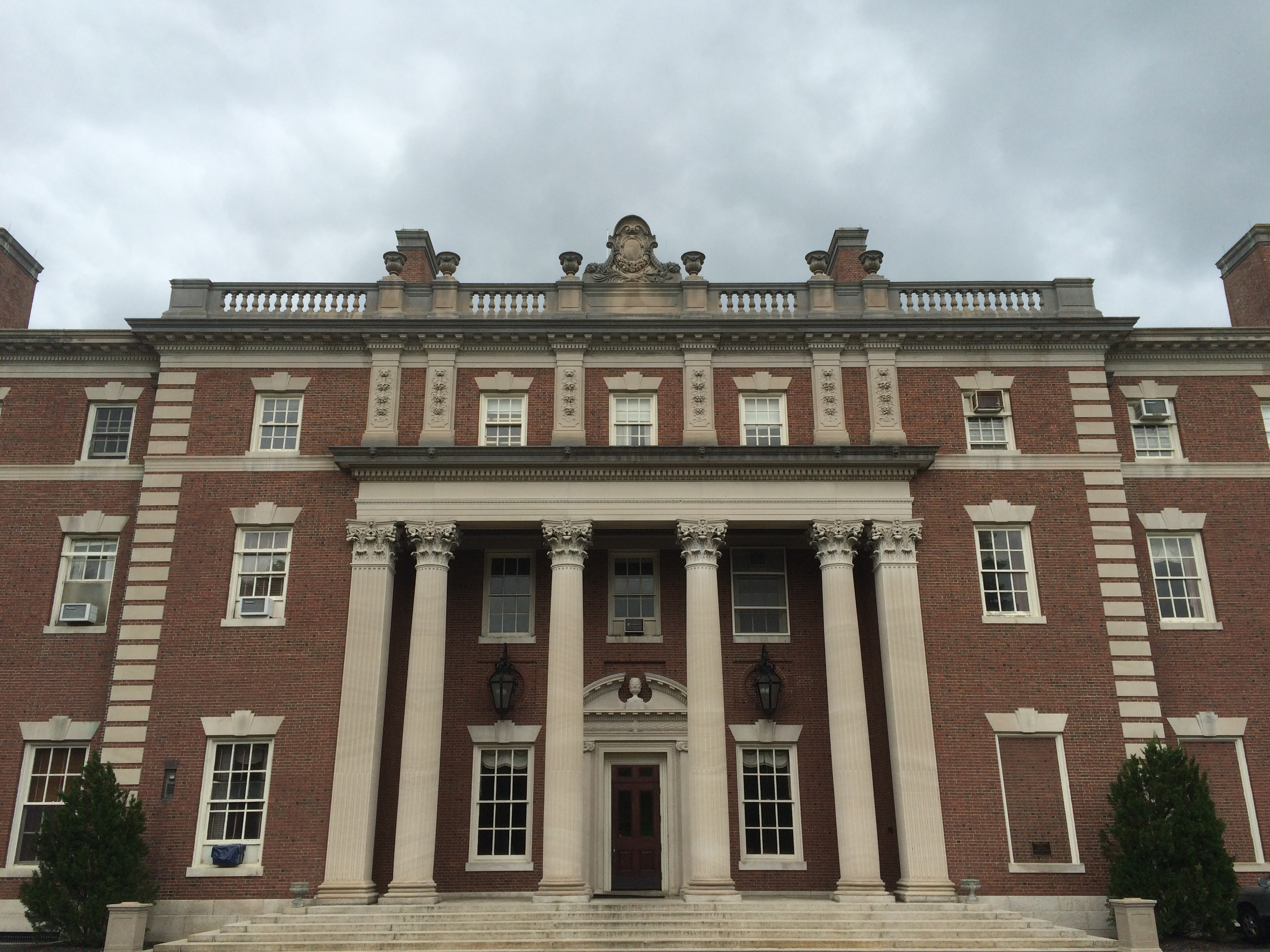
The main entrance

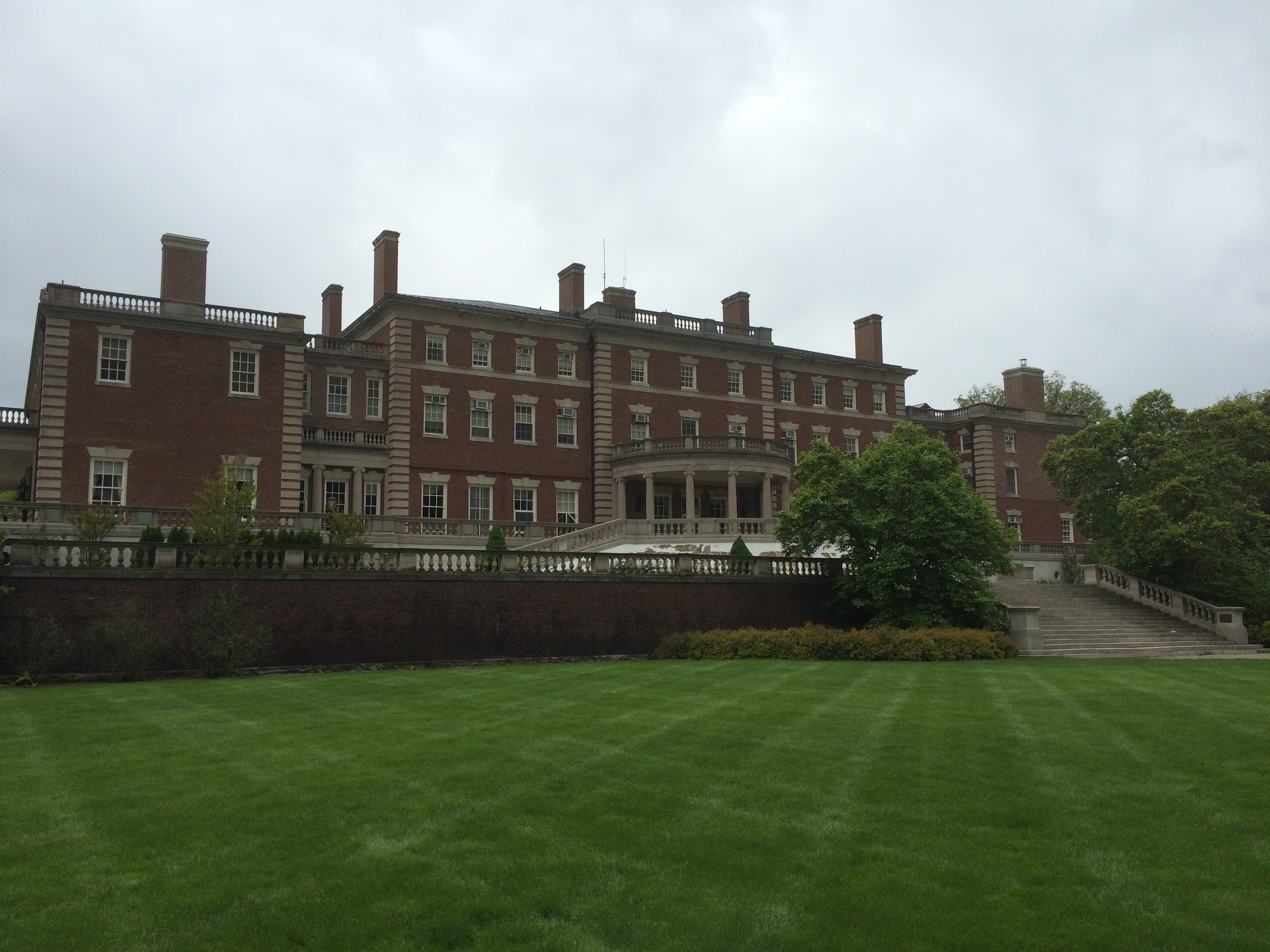
View from the garden

=== Florham and the decline of the Vanderbilts ===
Hamilton McKown Twombly died in 1910; Florence survived him by 42 years, with the lavish, Gilded Age lifestyle being retained long after her husband's death. Of Florence's two surviving children, Ruth Twombly and Florence Twombly Burden, only Florence Burden married and had two sons. By the time of Florence Vanderbilt's death in 1952, the Burden family could not continue Florham's lifestyle, and the estate was broken up and sold in 1955. None of the numerous Vanderbilt estates remained in the family, other than Biltmore. Arthur T. Vanderbilt II noted:

These magnificent country homes ... were built to become precisely the equivalent of those Old World palaces, great ancestral homes that would proclaim for centuries, for all time, the prominence of the Vanderbilts ... But it did not work out that way. Far from becoming ancestral homes, these monuments to limitless wealth, built for eternity, were hardly used for a lifetime. None was occupied by the next generation.

Several months before the estate sale auction, William Burden, son of Florence Twombly Burden, gave dozens of the house's interior fittings to the White House. Many of these items remain in the White House collection, including several chairs from the estate, which have sat in the Oval Office under Presidents George W. Bush, Barack Obama and Donald Trump.

== Fairleigh Dickinson University ==
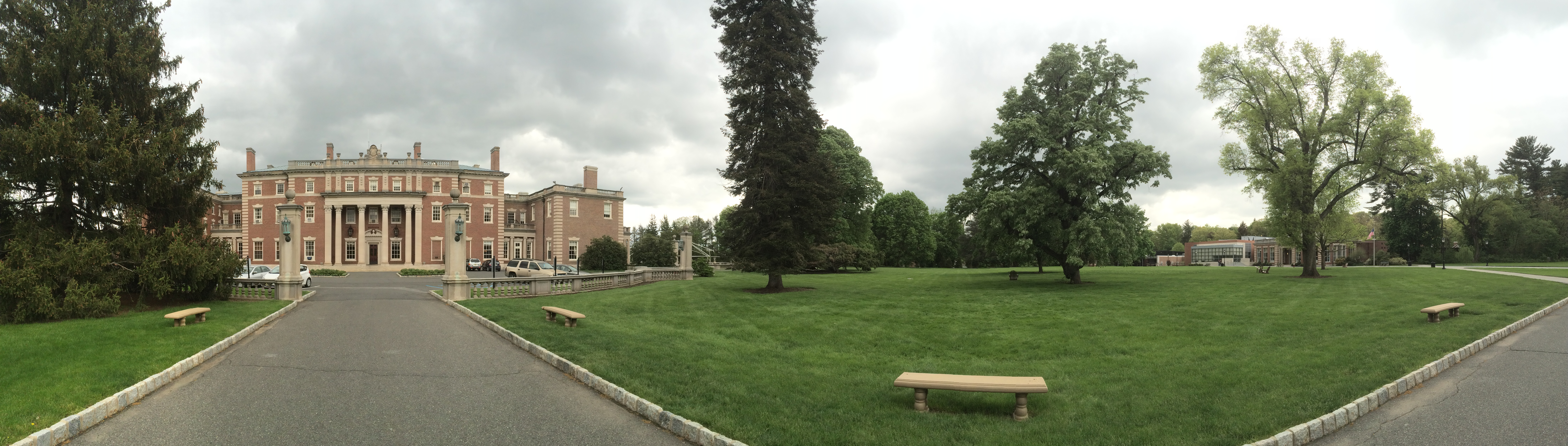
Panorama of the main approach to the mansion at Florham

Florence and her daughter Ruth died in 1952 and 1954, respectively, and the estate was broken up, with the bulk of the lower portion, occupied by the dairy farm and stables, going to Standard Oil of New Jersey (today's Exxon), later to be sub-developed into a corporate park. The mansion, with 178 acres (72 ha) of gardens, the carriage house and greenhouses were sold in 1957 to the expanding Fairleigh Dickinson University, to be the school's Morris County campus. Funded by Colonel Fairleigh S. Dickinson in Rutherford, NJ, to be a liberal arts school for Northern New Jersey, the university now has four campuses in three countries. The founding president of Fairleigh Dickinson, Peter Sammartino, oversaw the purchase of the estate, hasty renovation, and its opening to students in the fall of 1958.

The carriage house was remodeled as the university's science labs, and the orangery was preserved and now functions as reading room of the campus library. While pieces of the estate have been remodeled for educational use, the university has been careful to preserve its history and environment. Realizing the responsibility and opportunity of this Vanderbilt treasure, the university has been engaged in the gradual restoration of both the mansion and grounds. In 1990, the Friends of Florham was founded for volunteers who research the building's history and donate to its upkeep.

== Bibliography ==
- Bere, Carol and Samuel Convissor, Florham: An American Treasure (2016) ISBN 978-0578180861
- Cummins, Walter and Arthur T Vanderbilt II, Olmsted's Vision: The Landscape of Florham (2018) ISBN 978-0692101964
- Cummins, Walter and Arthur T Vanderbilt II, "The Richest and Most Famous Private Chef in the World" Joseph Donon: Gilded Age Dining with Florence Vanderbilt Twombly (2017) ISBN 978-0692893371
- Friends of Florham and Fairleigh Dickinson University Florham: The Lives of an American Estate (2011) ISBN 978-0615567433
- Vanderbilt, Arthur T., Fortune's Children: The Fall of the House of Vanderbilt William Morrow Paperbacks; Reprint edition (2001) ISBN 978-0062224064
