= Shirley Burden =

American film producer

- Born: Shirley Carter Burden; December 9, 1908; New York City
- Died: June 3, 1989 (aged 80); Teterboro, New Jersey
- Education: Browning School
- Occupations: Writer, photographer
- Spouses: Flobelle Fairbanks (m. 1937; died 1969) Julietta Valverde Lyon (m. 1971)
- Children: Margaret Florence; Shirley Carter Burden, Jr.
- Parent(s): William Armistead Moale Burden Sr. Florence Vanderbilt Twombly
- Family: Vanderbilt family

Shirley Carter Burden (December 9, 1908 – June 3, 1989) was an American photographer, author of picture essays on racism, Catholicism, and history of place. He served on several advisory committees of museums and was a trustee and the chairman of the photography committee at the Museum of Modern Art in New York. He was also chairman of the photography magazine Aperture.

== Early life ==
Shirley Carter Burden was born on December 9, 1908, in New York City, the younger son of William Armistead Moale Burden Sr. and Florence Vanderbilt (née Twombly) Burden. He was the brother of Ambassador William Armistead Moale Burden Jr. Their maternal grandparents were Florence Adele Vanderbilt Twombly (1854–1952) of the Vanderbilt family and Hamilton McKown Twombly (1849–1910), and the brothers were great-great-grandsons of Cornelius Vanderbilt.

He was at the Browning School in New York City until 1926, but did not go on to college or university education.

== Career ==
Beginning in 1924, Burden assisted at Pathé News. In 1926, he and his cousin filmed an Ontario Indian tribe for their The Silent Enemy, and from 1927 held a minor position at Paramount Studios. A 1929 meeting with Edward Steichen inspired his interest in photography and later gained his mentorship. He sought better motion picture prospects in California and Hollywood and from 1929 to 1934 used his contact Merian C. Cooper to gain associate producer work, most significantly at RKO on Academy Award nominated "She".

=== Commercial career ===
During World War II, Burden established Tradefilms in 1942, successfully producing training films which were then in demand from the US Navy, the Office of Education, and Lockheed Aircraft. This business was unsustainable postwar and Burden and Tradefilms partner Todd Walker opened a photography studio in Beverly Hills, California, in 1946, producing advertising and architectural photography for magazines Architectural Forum, House and Garden, Arts and Architecture.

He was a senior partner in William A. M. Burden & Company, a private investment firm.

=== Fine art career ===
Dissatisfied with commercial photography, and having embraced Roman Catholicism, Burden decided on a more fulfilling fine art career, encouraged by Minor White whom he met in 1952. The friendship developed into his patronage of White's Aperture magazine. He assisted Edward Steichen in gathering photography for, and subsequently contributing images to, MoMA's highly successful, international travelling Family of Man (1955), working on this also with Dorothea Lange whom he befriended.

These contacts and experience launched a successful fine art photography career. His photo-essay on the all-but-abandoned Ellis Island, was exhibited under the auspices of the City of New York, and an invitation to exhibit his essay on the Weehawken ferry at MoMA in Diogenes With a Camera IV in 1958, curated by Steichen, who encouraged Burden to photograph Trappist monks at the abbey of Our Lady of Gethsemani, Kentucky (God Is My Life). Travel to Lourdes in 1960 resulted in Behold Thy Mother, published by Doubleday in 1965, and notoriety continued with the well publicised I Wonder Why, which documented racism experienced by a young black girl.

He continued with his photo essays (on Japan, and his ancestors, the Vanderbilts) and he repaid his success by chairing or advising a range of photography organisations, and teaching (1978–81, at the Art Center College of Design in Pasadena, California.).

== Personal life ==
In 1934, Burden married Flobelle Fairbanks, an actress and niece of actor Douglas Fairbanks Sr. Together, they were the parents of two children, a daughter and a son:

- Margaret Florence (1936–2019), who married Daniel Childs.
- Shirley Carter Burden Jr. (1941–1996), who was a former assistant to Senator Robert F. Kennedy, and who was married to Amanda Jay Mortimer (b. 1944) before their divorce in 1972.

After the death of his first wife Flobelle on January 5, 1969, Burden married Julietta Valverde Lyon in 1971.

Burden died June 3, 1989, of Lou Gehrig's disease above Teterboro Airport, on a Los Angeles to New York flight. His grandson, S. Carter Burden III, is the founder of the managed web hosting provider Logicworks. His granddaughter, Constance Childs, married celebrity chef and Food Network host David Rosengarten.

=== Legacy ===
He gifted or exchanged, in memory of his first wife Flobelle, large numbers of photographs from his generous and eclectic collection of modernist works to MoMA, The Centre for Photography and other institutions. In 1989, 5 years after Aperture moved headquarters to a five-story brownstone at 20 East 23rd Street in New York, the building's second floor was devoted to the Burden Gallery, in recognition of Burden's longtime support. The Burden Professorship in Photography at Harvard University in 1999 was established posthumously by his family.

Burden's papers are held by the New York Public Library Manuscripts and Archives Division.

== Books ==
- 1960 God Is My Life
- 1963 I Wonder Why
- 1965 Behold Thy Mother
- 1981 Presence
- 1981The Vanderbilts in My Life
- 1985 Chairs
- 1989 The Mary I Love

== Films ==
- 1930 The Silent Enemy (assistant editor)
- 1933 Before Dawn (associate producer)
- 1935 She (production associate)
- 1940 Look to Lockheed for Leadership (Documentary short)
- 1940 The Alchemist in Hollywood
