= Ruth Vanderbilt Twombly =

American philanthropist, tennis coach, socialite and heiress

- Born: April 15, 1885; New York City, United States
- Died: September 1, 1954 (aged 69); Hôtel Ritz, Paris, France
- Parents: Florence Adele Vanderbilt Twombly; Hamilton McKown Twombly

Ruth Vanderbilt Twombly (April 15, 1885 – September 1, 1954) was an American philanthropist, tennis coach, socialite, and heiress to the Vanderbilt family fortune.

In 1931, she was the Chairman of the Peacock Ball, later called "the greatest charity event ever held."

== Personal life ==
Twombly was born in New York, New York, on April 15, 1885. Her parents were Florence Adele Vanderbilt, an American socialite and heiress, and Hamilton McKown Twombly, an American businessman. Her great-grandfather was Cornelius Vanderbilt, railroad magnate.

Some time during the Gilded Age, Twombly and her mother commissioned American architect Whitney Warren to design a playhouse for their estate. It included a pool and "a scenic landscape by Chanler that featured a broad assortment of bird life, including turkeys, peacocks, flamingos and cranes."

In 1908, Twombly was a bridesmaid during a "notable international marriage event" of Gladys Vanderbilt and Count László Széchenyi of Hungary. Széchenyi was chamberlain to the Austrian emperor. The ceremony, led by St. Patrick's Cathedral Monsignor Michael J. Lavelle, took place at the Cornelius Vanderbilt II House at 1 West 57th Street, New York.

In 1918, she attended the Easter parade on 5th Avenue, and Issues and Events magazine reported on her outfit.

In 1923, fashion magazine Harper's Bazaar described Twombly as wearing a "deep, rose-colored satin" outfit to the Met Opera in a fashion article.

In 1928, her address is included in Dau's New York Social Blue Book, a listing of prominent family's addresses.

== Philanthropy ==
On November 6, 1931, Twombly was the Chairman of the Peacock Ball, a New York charity event with 3,000 prominent attendees. Guests included notables of stage, screen, and radio, including Rudy Vallée, Marion Harris, and Nick Lucas. It was held in the newly constructed Waldorf-Astoria and broadcast live over WJZ Radio. Proceeds would go to the Association for Improving the Condition of the Poor. The following year, the event featured 11 orchestras and over 500 musicians. The Peacock Ball has since been called "the greatest charity event ever held," despite the luxurious event being held during the Great Depression.

In 1926, Twombly founded The Opportunity Shop, a high-end charity thrift shop and volunteer project. It was located on the ground floor of 46 West 47th Street and celebrated its 40-year anniversary in 1966.

Some time after 1938, Twombly was active with the Community Service Society of New York.

One of her personal chefs was French "master chef" Joseph Donon, who served her and other members of her family for 38 years. The New Yorker has called Donon "probably the richest and most famous private chef in the world."

In 1940, Twombly was involved, possibly as an investor, in the Redwood Library and Athenaeum in Newport, Rhode Island.

== Death and legacy ==
On September 1, 1954, Twombly died of heart failure at the Hôtel Ritz in Paris, France, a city she "dearly loved." Twombly left behind an estate of $22 million, which was liquidated in an auction on July 15 and 16 of 1955. The auction included furniture, rugs, tapestries, and other fine art pieces. The highest individual item sold for $315,195.
