= Henry Burden =

American engineer and businessman

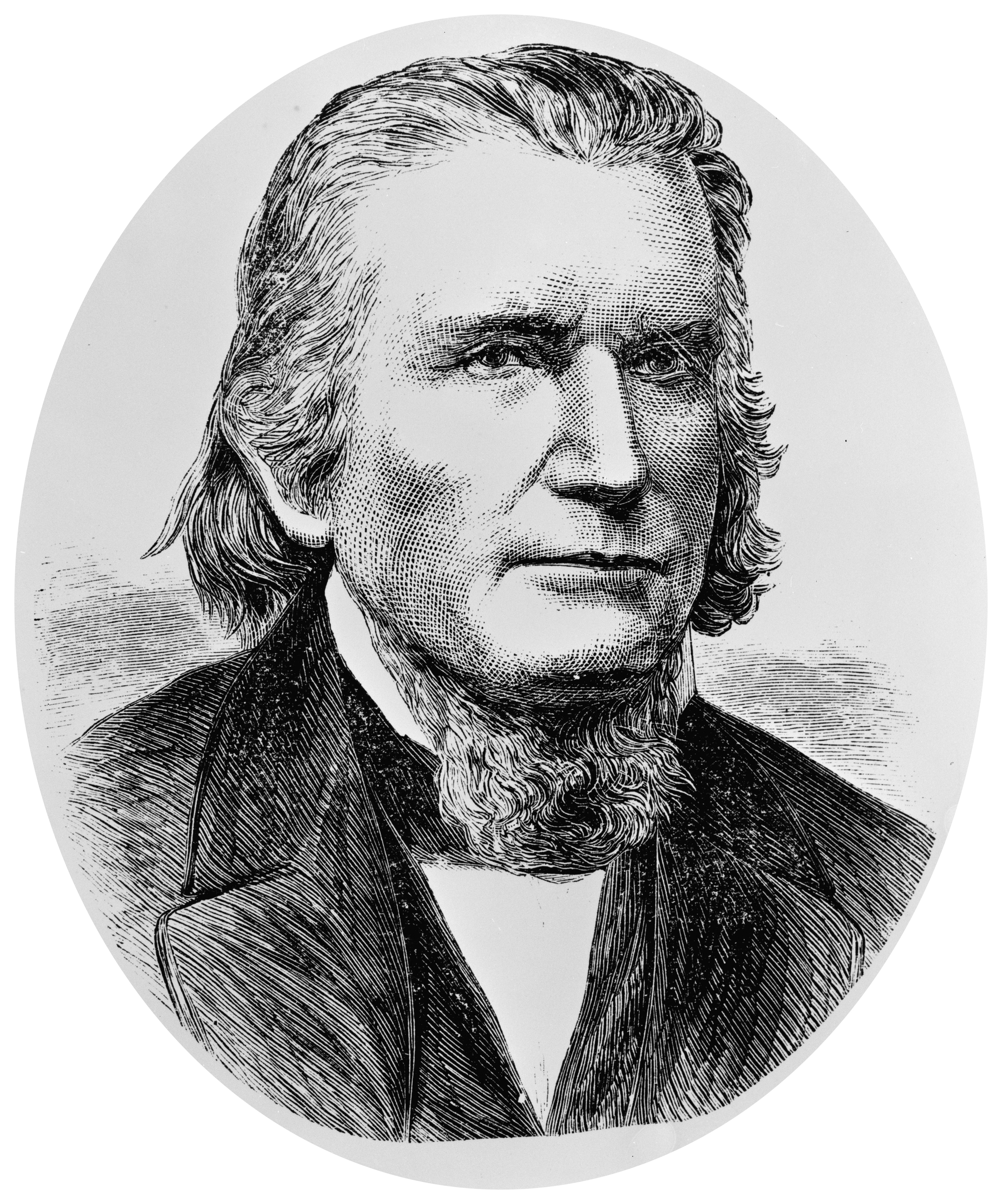
- Born: April 22, 1791; Dunblane, Perthshire, Scotland
- Died: January 19, 1871 (aged 79); Troy, New York, U.S.
- Education: University of Edinburgh
- Known for: Founder of Burden Iron Works
- Spouse: Helen McOuat (m. 1821; died 1860)
- Children: 8, including William, Isaiah
- Parent(s): Peter Burden; Elizabeth Abercrombie Burden
- Relatives: James A. Burden Jr. (grandson); William A. M. Burden Sr. (grandson)

Henry Burden (April 22, 1791 – January 19, 1871) was an engineer and businessman who built an industrial complex in Troy, New York called the Burden Iron Works. Burden's horseshoe machine, invented in 1835, was capable of making 60 horseshoes a minute. His rotary concentric squeezer, a machine for working wrought iron, was adopted by iron industries worldwide. His hook-headed spike machine helped fuel the rapid expansion of railroads in the U.S. The Burden Iron Works is now an historical site and museum.

== Early life ==
Henry Burden was born on April 22, 1791 in Dunblane, Stirlingshire, Scotland, the son of Peter Burden (1752–1829) and Elizabeth Abercrombie (1756–1837). His father was a sheep farmer. An account cited that he constructed a threshing machine for his father before he went to college. He studied mathematics, engineering, and drawing at the University of Edinburgh. He returned to the farm making implements and a water wheel to power them.

He emigrated in 1819 with a letter of introduction to Stephen Van Rensselaer III, courtesy of the American Minister in London.

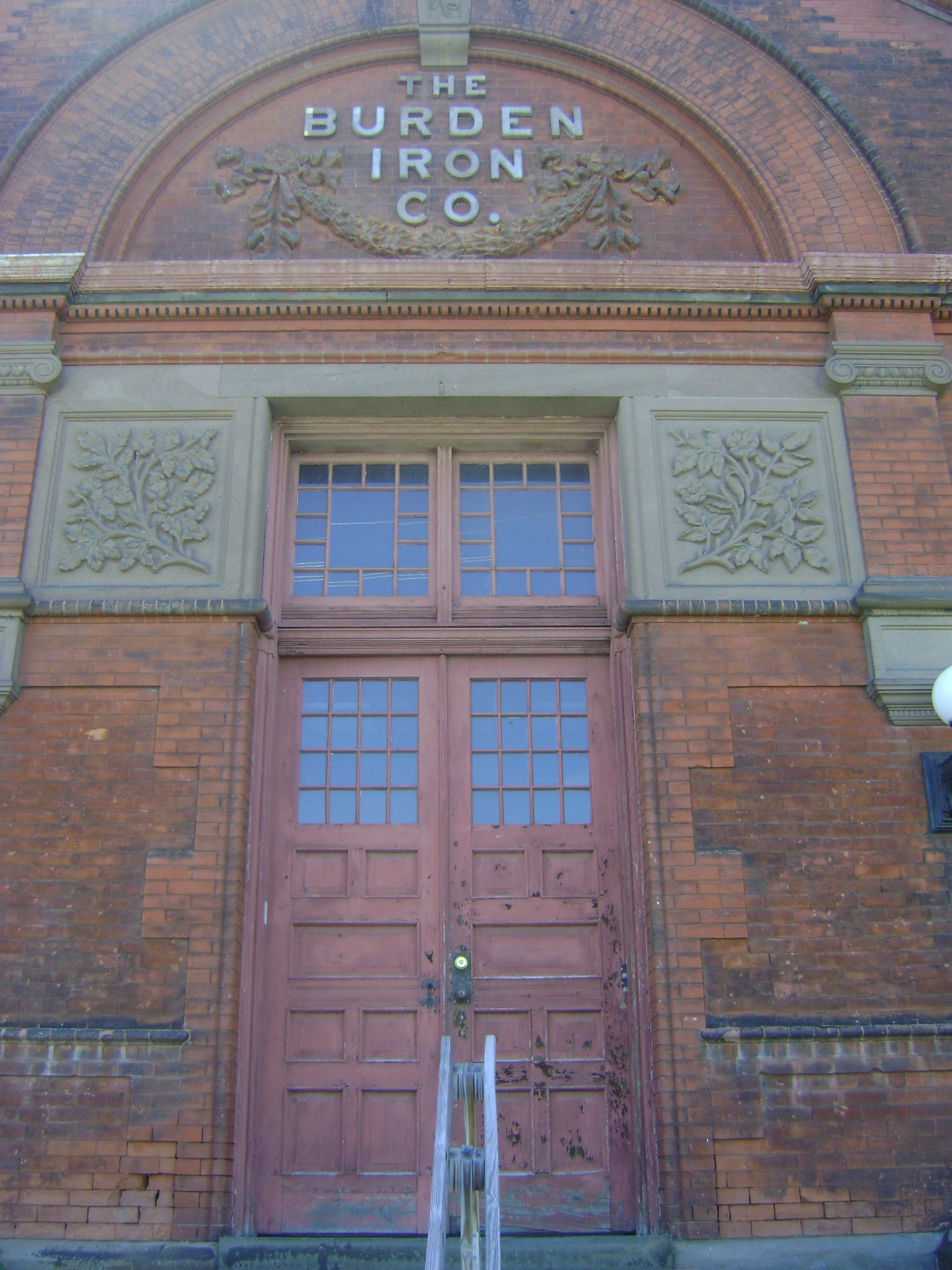
Entrance to the old office

== Career ==
Burden started at the Townsend & Corning Foundry, manufacturers of cast iron plows and other agricultural implements, located in Albany’s south end - near today’s Port of Albany. In 1820, he invented an improved plow, which took first premium at three county fairs, and a cultivator, which was said to have been the first to be put into practical operation in the country. He also made mechanical improvements on threshing machines and grist mills.

He moved to Troy, New York, in 1822, and worked as superintendent of the Troy Iron and Nail Factory. His position at the company included the supervision of its operations. The factory was located on north side of the Wynantskill Creek in South Troy, about a half-mile northeast of today’s Troy-Menands bridge. Burden's inventions, which automated work that was previously done by hand, made the factory extremely profitable. Burden soon became the sole owner of the factory and renamed it H. Burden and Sons. The Burden Iron Works, as it came to be known, produced a variety of iron-based products.

=== Innovator ===
He experimented not only in the manufacture of items like horseshoes and spikes, but also in the production of machines to make them. In May 1825, he secured a patent for a machine to make spikes, which up until then were made by hand. The Burden Iron Works produced the first ship spikes and the first horseshoes made by machinery in the world. In 1835 he designed the "Horseshoe Machine" that could produce 60 shoes a minute. Burden became the chief horseshoe producer for the Union Army.

Burden became involved in supplying the iron needed by the nation's rapidly expanding railroads. In 1840 he obtained a patent for the first hook-headed spike. He made ten tons of these for the Long Island Railroad in 1836. His suit against Corning and Winslow for patent infringement lasted from 1842 to 1867, when the patent was upheld. The hook-headed spike he invented was used on nearly every railroad in the United States, contributing to the rapid progress of railroad building in the country. Also in 1840 he obtained a patent for the "rotary squeezer", which came to be used in all the leading iron manufactories in both America and Europe. Burden held twelve patents in total.

He was also among the first to suggest the use of plates for iron-clad seagoing vessels, and sent specimen plates of his own manufacture to Glasgow for testing. The company forged the hull plates for the USS Monitor, the Navy's first iron-clad battleship, which engaged the Confederacy's Merrimac in 1862 in the first battle of its kind.

=== Burden Iron Works ===
As the manufacture of iron became the principal business of this company, Burden supervised the construction of blast furnaces, Bessemer-type furnaces and rolling mills. Burden replaced the small wooden mill with a large millworks. The river adjacent to the works was shallow and full of bars, and the land along the river was low and frequently flooded. At great expense, Burden had the grounds filled in, and the river dredged, so that the company's docks were accessible to large vessels. A network of railroad tracks wove through the property to move train loads of sand, iron ore from the Lake Champlain region, and limestone from the downriver city of Hudson. The firm had its own locomotive. Steam derricks were used to unload coal from the dock and move it to the coal heap, three hundred feet distant, a ton at a time.

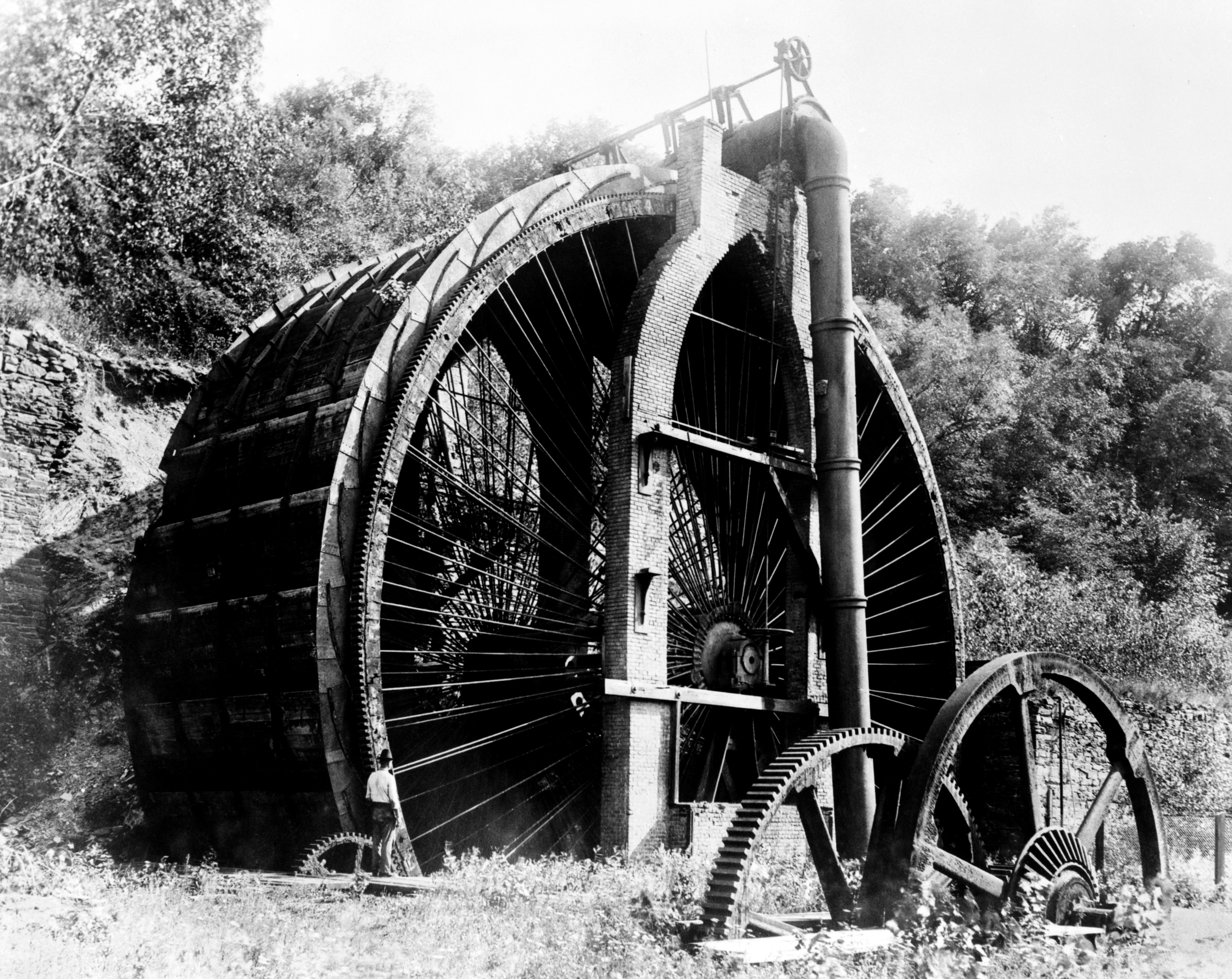
Waterwheel at Burden Iron Works, Troy, New York; note man in foreground

He originated a system of reservoirs along the Wynantskill Creek to hold the water in reserve and increase the water-supply to power the mills. In order to find the necessary power to run his foundry, in 1851 Burden designed and constructed a 60-foot wheel that could generate 500 horsepower. The poet Louis Gaylor Clark, characterized the huge wheel as the "Niagara of Water-Wheels". The wheel's design caught the eye of Rensselaer Polytechnic Institute student George W.G. Ferris, who in 1893 unveiled his own invention, the Ferris Wheel, similar to Henry Burden's water wheel.

Some idea of the magnitude of the ironworks at Troy is suggested by the fact that in 1864 the cost of iron, coal, and other materials was over $1,500,000. Burden Iron Works used 90,000 tons of coal annually. In 1880 the ironworks employed 1,400 men. The ironworks produced 600,000 kegs of horseshoes and 42,000 tons of iron, exclusive of pig, annually. Their yearly sales of horseshoes average about $2,000,000.

Burden was described as a large man with deep-set eyes and a cheerful demeanor, and an accomplished mechanic who could make a better piece of work than any man in his shops and deal a heavier sledge blow than any of his strikers at the forge. He was considered both upright and apt to assume the uprightness of others.

The Henry Burden family papers are located at the William L. Clements Library, University of Michigan in Ann Arbor. They contain correspondence from 1816 to 1853 between Burden, his business acquaintances, and his sons pertaining to his numerous industrial inventions and to the business affairs of the Troy Iron and Nail Factory in Troy, New York. The collection documents the iron industry in the mid-19th century, as well as the market for Burden's numerous industrial inventions.

=== Steamboats ===
Burden had a great interest in navigation. As early as 1825 he laid before the Troy Steamboat Association certain original plans whereby the construction of steamboats for inland navigation could be greatly improved, and which some years later were adopted in the building of the steamer 'Hendrick Hudson.' In 1833, he created the steamboat "Helen," named in honor of his wife. Its deck rested upon two cigar-shaped hulls, three hundred feet in length, with a paddle-wheel amidships thirty feet in diameter. The boat was lost on its first trial due to pilot mismanagement, and Burden turned his attention to ocean navigation.

Besides increasing the length of the boats, he suggested, for the convenience and accommodation of passengers, the erection of sleeping-berth-rooms on the upper decks, being a decided change from the holds of vessels, where they had previously been placed. His views on navigation being known, some gentlemen of Glasgow issued, with his permission, a prospectus of "Burden's Atlantic Steam-Ferry Company." Although the company never materialized his ideas were subsequently imitated by Samuel Cunard of the Cunard Line.

=== Woodside Presbyterian Church ===
Postcard depicting the church

Woodside Presbyterian Church was built in 1869 by Henry Burden on land owned by Erastus Corning, of Corning's Albany Iron Works as a memorial to the wife of Henry Burden, who died in 1860. She had expressed concern for the iron workers and their families, who had to walk miles in inclement weather to churches in downtown Troy and wished for a church closer to the Iron Works. An inscription on the church wall reads, "Woodside Memorial Church, dedicated to the service of the Triune God, has been erected to the memory of Helen Burden by her husband, Henry Burden, in accordance with her long-cherished and earnest desire, 1869." Erected at a cost of $75,000, it was the third most expensive church edifice in Troy at the time. The site is adjacent to Wynantskill Creek.

== Personal life ==
On January 23, 1821, at Saint Gabriel Presbyterian Church in Montreal, Québec, Henry Burden wed Helen McOuat (1802–1860), whom he had known in Scotland. She was the daughter of James McOuat (1762–1837) and Margaret Bilsland (1770–1840). Her family immigrated to Canada and were based in Lachute, Québec, Canada at the time of her marriage to Henry. Together, Helen and Henry had eight children:

- Peter Abercrombie Burden (1822–1866), who married Abigail Abby Akin Shepherd (1826–1853).
- Margaret Elizabeth Burden (1824–1911), who married Ebenezer Proudfit (1808–1880).
- Helen Burden (1826–1891), who married Gen. Irvin McDowell (1818–1885).
- Henry James Burden (1828–1846), who died at age 18, unmarried.
- William Fletcher Burden (1830–1867), who married Julia Ann Hart (1833–1867).
- James Abercrombie Burden (1833–1906), who married Mary Proudfit Irvin (1848–1920).
- Isaiah Townsend Burden (1838–1913), who married Evelyn Byrd Moale (1847–1916).
- Jessie Burden (1840–1911), who married Charles Frederick Wadsworth (1835–1899).

His wife died on March 10, 1860, in Troy. Henry Burden died of heart disease on Thursday morning, January 19, 1871. Burden's funeral was held at the Woodside Presbyterian Church, which he had built near the ironworks. On the day of the funeral the Burden Mills, the Albany Iron Works, the J.A. Griswold & Co. works, and the Cohoes rolling mill of Morrison and Colwell all closed so that the workers could attend. Also in attendance was the Thomas Cornet Band wearing "the usual badge of mourning".

At one time Henry Burden employed almost one-eighth of the population of the city of Troy, and "spent a lifetime in devising means for lightening toil".

=== Descendants ===
Margaret Elizabeth Burden Proudfit (1824–1911), Henry's and Helen's first daughter, wrote a long biographical account of her family. Margaret was an accomplished draughtswoman and writer.

Two of Henry's grandsons, James A. Burden Jr. and William A. M. Burden Sr., married granddaughters of William Henry Vanderbilt. Another grandson, Arthur Scott Burden, was the first husband of Cynthia Roche.
