= Hamilton McKown Twombly =

American businessman (1849–1910)

Hamilton McKown Twombly Sr.
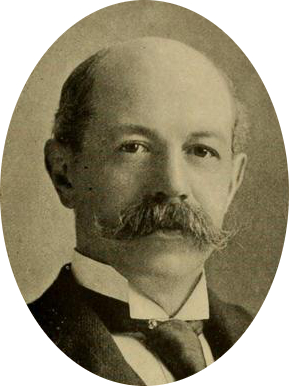
- Born: August 11, 1849; Middlesex County, Massachusetts
- Died: January 11, 1910 (aged 60); Madison, New Jersey
- Education: Harvard University
- Occupation: Businessman
- Spouse: Florence Adele Vanderbilt (m. 1877)
- Children: Alice Twombly; Florence Adele Twombly; Ruth Twombly; Hamilton McKown Twombly, Jr.

Hamilton McKown Twombly Sr. (August 11, 1849 – January 11, 1910) was an American businessman and a co-founder of General Electric.

== Early life ==
Hamilton McKown Twombly Sr. was born on August 11, 1849, in Middlesex County, Massachusetts, and grew up in Boston. His parents were Alexander Hamilton Twombly (1804–1870) and Caroline (née McKown) Twombly (1821–1881). Twombly's siblings included Alexander Stevenson Twombly (1832–1907), Alice W. Twombly Jones (1848–1906), and Almina E. Twombly Sheldon (1851–1875). He attended and graduated from Harvard University in 1871.

== Career ==
Twombly worked as a financial advisor to William Henry Vanderbilt (1821–1885), President of the New York Central Railroad. He sat on the Boards of Directors of the Chicago and North Western Railway, the Delaware, Lackawanna and Western Railroad, the Chesapeake and Ohio Railway, and the New Jersey Shore Line Railroad. He also sat on the Boards of Trustees of the Guarantee Trust Company and the Mutual Life Insurance Company.

In 1890, Abram Hewitt partnered with Edward Cooper and Hamilton M. Twombly in forming the American Sulphur Company. That company then entered into a 50/50 agreement with Herman Frasch and his partners to form the Union Sulphur Company

=== Society life ===
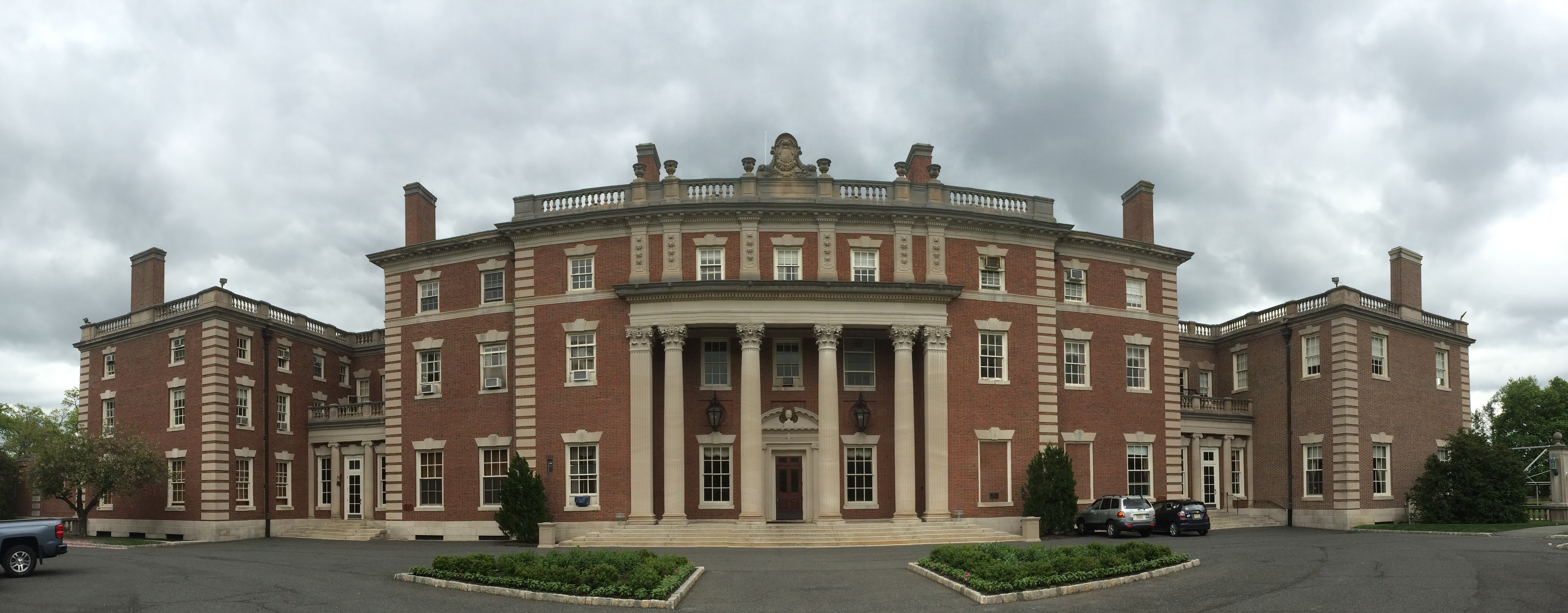
Florham, Twombly's estate in Florham Park, New Jersey

In 1892, Twombly and his wife were both included in Ward McAllister's "Four Hundred", purported to be an index of New York's best families led by Mrs. Astor, as published in The New York Times. Conveniently, 400 was the number of people that could fit into Mrs. Astor's ballroom.

In spring and fall, Twombly and his wife resided at Florham (a combination of "Florence" and "Hamilton") in Florham Park, New Jersey; it is now "Florham Campus" a building of Fairleigh Dickinson University. They summered at Vinland Estate in Newport, Rhode Island, and they wintered at 684 Fifth Avenue in Manhattan

He was a member of the Metropolitan Club, the Tuxedo Club, the Union Club of the City of New York, the City Club, the New York Yacht Club, the Transportation Club, Turf and Field and the Somerset Club of Boston.

== Personal life ==
In 1877, he married Florence Adele Vanderbilt (1854–1952), a daughter of William Henry Vanderbilt and Maria Louisa Kissam. They had four children:

- Alice Twombly (1879–1896), who died at the age of sixteen on the eve of her society debut.
- Florence Vanderbilt Twombly (1881–1969), who married William Armistead Moale Burden (1877–1909), a son of I. Townsend Burden and grandson of Henry Burden, in 1904.
- Ruth Vanderbilt Twombly (1884–1954), who took over management of the Twombly estate after her father's death.
- Hamilton McKown Twombly, Jr. (1887–1906), who drowned in an accident at age 18.

Twombly died on January 11, 1910, in Madison, New Jersey, after an extended illness. According to his obituary, his death was caused by "cancer and a broken heart" over the death of his son. His funeral took place at Saint Thomas Church in New York, with a sermon by David H. Greer (1844–1919), and the banker J. P. Morgan (1837–1913) was one of the pallbearers. He was buried in the Woodlawn Cemetery in The Bronx. He left the majority of his estate to his wife.
