= William A. M. Burden Sr. =

American football player (1877–1909)

- Born: William Armistead Moale Burden; July 11, 1877; Troy, New York
- Died: February 2, 1909 (aged 31); Manhattan, New York
- Education: Groton School; Harvard University
- Occupation: stockbroker
- Spouse: Florence Vanderbilt Twombly (m. 1904)
- Children: William A. M. Burden Jr. Shirley Carter Burden
- Parent(s): I. Townsend Burden; Evelyn Byrd Moale Burden

William Armistead Moale Burden Sr. (July 11, 1877 – February 2, 1909) was an American football guard for the Harvard Crimson football team and stock broker.

== Early life ==
Burden was born on July 11, 1877 in Troy, New York to millionaire iron manufacturer I. Townsend Burden and Evelyn Byrd (Moale) Burden. He attended Groton School where he was a member of the school's football team. In 1895, he succeeded Percy Haughton as team captain.

=== Harvard ===
Burden played on the Harvard freshman football team in 1896. The following season he became the backup center on the varsity team. In 1898 he became a starting guard and in 1899 was the team captain. Following his senior season, Burden was named a second-team All-American by the New York Tribune and Outing and a third-team All-American by Walter Camp. Outside of football, Burden was first marshall and president of his class as well as president of the Hasty Pudding and Groton clubs. Burden graduated from Harvard in 1900.

== Career ==
Immediately after leaving school, Burden, Francis Lee Higginson, John L. Saltonstall, and Augustus Jay took a trip around the world. He eventually returned to New York City, where he worked for James D. Smith & Co. On August 19, 1903, he purchased a seat on the New York Stock Exchange from Henry G. Weil for $60,000.

On October 1, 1907, Burden retired as a floor member of James D. Smith & Co. due to ill health. He was sent abroad to recover, however his health did not improve.

== Personal life ==
On April 12, 1904, he married Florence Vanderbilt Twombly, daughter of Hamilton McKown Twombly and Florence Vanderbilt Twombly and a granddaughter of William Henry Vanderbilt, at Saint Thomas Church in Manhattan. The couple had two sons, William A. M. Burden Jr. (who became the U.S. Ambassador to Belgium) and Shirley Carter Burden (who became a prominent photographer).

On December 2, 1908, The New York Times reported that his unknown illness had gotten worse and he had been bedridden for several months. Doctors were unable to diagnose or treat Burden's illness, which was described by The New York Times as a "chronic recurrent fever" that "attacks the patient suddenly...if he recovers, the only thing to do is prepare him for the next attack, which is sure to come". He died on February 2, 1909, aged 31, at his home in Manhattan.

=== Legacy ===
In 1971, Burden's widow and sons donated Burden Hall to Harvard Business School in honor of him and his grandson, William A. M. Burden III, who also died young.
