= Florence Vanderbilt Twombly =

American heiress and member of the Vanderbilt family

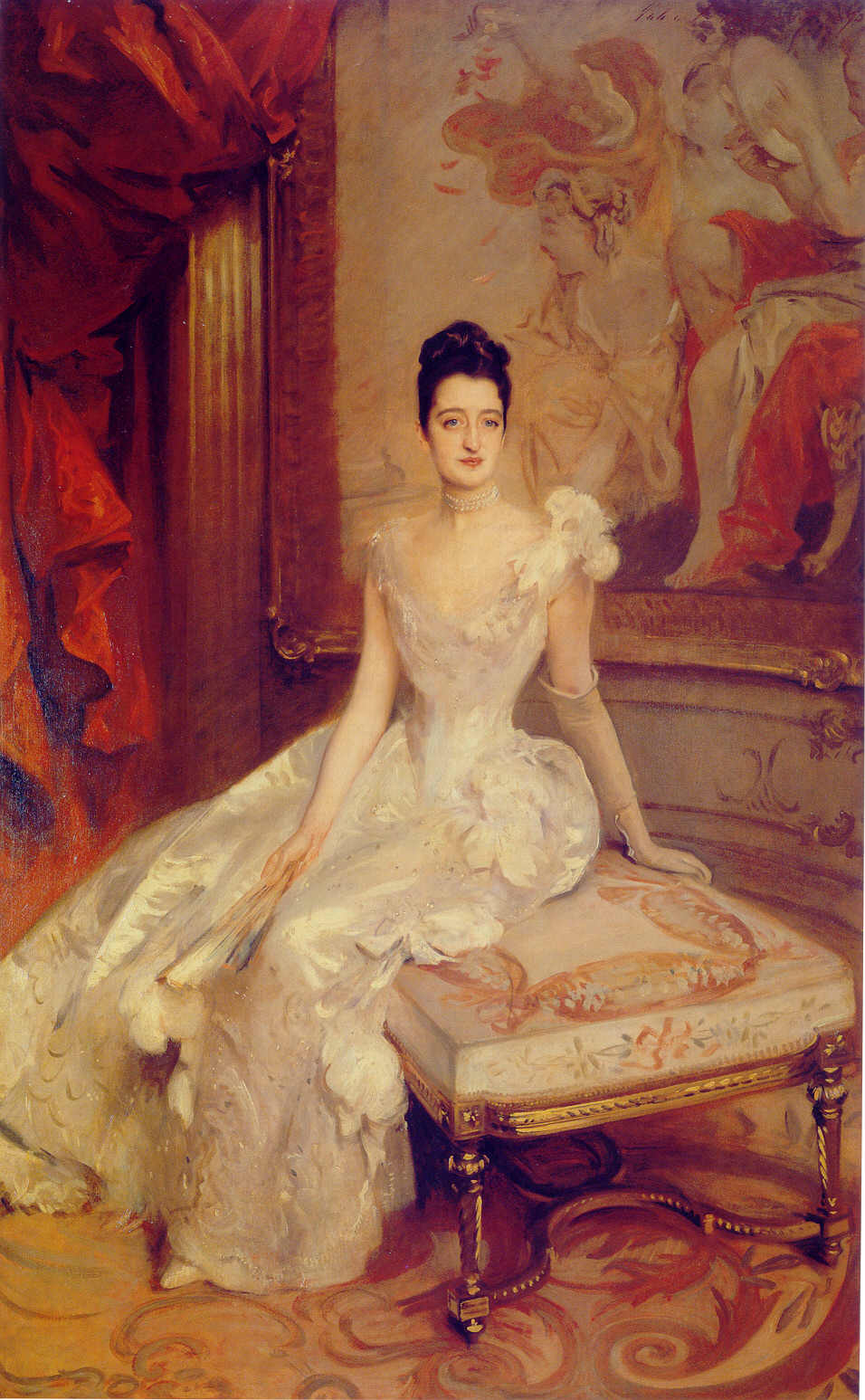
- Mrs. Hamilton McKown Twombly by John Singer Sargent
- Born: Florence Adele Vanderbilt; January 8, 1854; Staten Island, New York, US
- Died: April 11, 1952 (aged 98); New York City, US
- Occupation: Heiress
- Spouse: Hamilton McKown Twombly (m. 1877; died 1910)
- Children: 4
- Parent(s): William Henry Vanderbilt; Maria Louisa Kissam
- Family: Vanderbilt

Florence Adele Vanderbilt Twombly (née Vanderbilt; January 8, 1854 – April 11, 1952) was an American socialite and heiress. She was a member of the prominent Vanderbilt family. She and her husband Hamilton McKown Twombly built Florham, a gilded age estate in Madison, New Jersey.

In 1946, her relationship to her wealth was summarized by Collier's: "[Twombly] owns fifteen automobiles. She pays her chef $25,000 a year. Her butler has four footmen to assist him. Her New York mansion contains seventy rooms. At one of her country places she employs more than a hundred servants. And she does not crave publicity – she hates it!"

== Early life ==
Born on Staten Island on January 8, 1854, she was a daughter of William Henry Vanderbilt (1821–1885) and Maria Louisa Kissam (1821–1896). Her siblings were Cornelius II, Margaret Louisa, William Kissam, Frederick William, Eliza Osgood, Emily Thorn, and George Washington II. Her paternal grandfather was the Commodore Cornelius Vanderbilt (1794–1877), of whom she was the last surviving grandchild when she died aged 98 in 1952.

== Residences ==
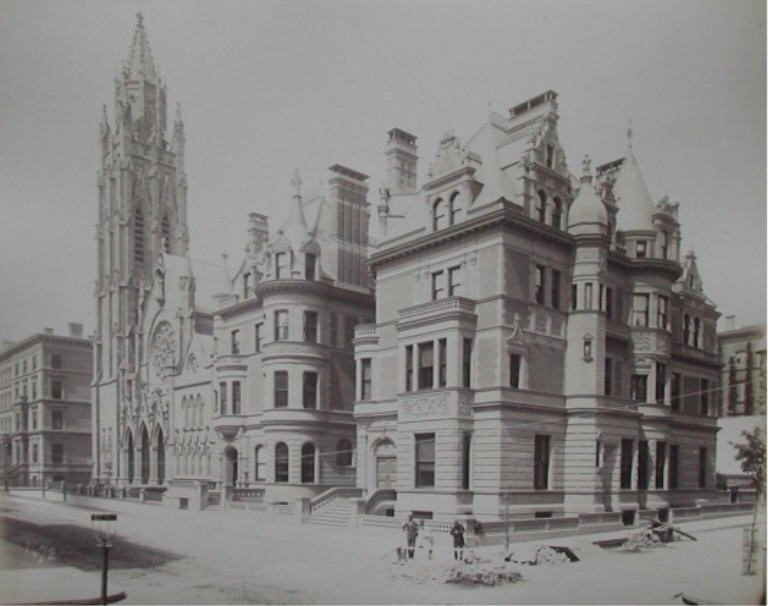
Twombly townhouse - 5th Avenue, NYC

Florence was known for her many elaborate homes, including her townhouse at 684 Fifth Avenue in New York City that was designed by John B. Snook and given as a gift from her father, William Henry Vanderbilt. The home was sold to John D. Rockefeller Jr. in 1925, and has since been demolished.

Her Vinland, a Romanesque "cottage" in Newport, Rhode Island, built in 1882 for tobacco heiress Catharine Lorillard Wolfe by Peabody & Stearns, purchased by the Twomblys in 1896 and greatly enlarged. Interiors by Ogden Codman. In 1955, it was purchased by the Salve Regina University and titled McAuley Hall.

Florham, an 800-acre estate in Florham Park, New Jersey, designed by McKim, Mead & White in 1897. Part of it including the manor house now belongs to Fairleigh Dickinson University. At Florham, Florence had a fleet of fifteen cars, including six maroon Rolls-Royces.

A second townhouse was a 70-room house located at 1 East 71st Street, New York City that was designed by Whitney Warren and has also since been demolished.

== Personal life ==
In 1877, Florence married Hamilton McKown Twombly (1849-1910). He was a son of Alexander Hamilton Twombly (1804–1870) and Caroline (née McKown) Twombly (1821–1881). Together, they had four children:

- Alice Twombly (1879–1896), who died at the age of sixteen on the eve of her society debut.
- Florence Vanderbilt Twombly (1881–1969), who married William Armistead Moale Burden (1877–1909), a son of I. Townsend Burden, in 1904.
- Ruth Vanderbilt Twombly (1885–1954), tennis coach and athlete, founder of charity thrift store "The Opportunity Shop" in Manhattan, and philanthropist. A lesbian, she did not marry. A New York Times article claimed she struggled heavily with alcoholism. She ultimately died from heart failure at the Ritz Hotel in Paris.
- Hamilton McKown Twombly Jr. (1888–1906), who drowned in an incident at a summer camp where he was working as a camp counselor.

Morristown farmer Caroline Foster was once invited to a dinner party at the Vanderbilt-Twombly Estate (now part of Fairleigh Dickinson University). Her friend Russel Myers described Foster's experience at the Twomblys':

[Foster was] greeted at the door by the butler, and Mrs. Twombly would be there. [Foster] would be introduced around and greet everybody and have a drink...After dinner, as was usual in those days, the gentlemen would go to one room with cigars and the ladies would go to another room...[After that,] Mrs. Twombly would come around and see each guest. When she got to the last person, she would say to the butler, "It is time." That meant time to go. People who had never been there before and did not realize what time to have their coachman return were left standing at the door.

Her husband died in 1910 after an extended illness. According to an obituary, his death was from "cancer and a broken heart" over the death of his son. She died April 11, 1952, in New York City, having outlived her husband by 42 years. She is in interred at Woodlawn Cemetery in the Bronx.

=== Descendants ===
Through her daughter Florence, she was the maternal grandmother of William A. M. Burden Jr. (1906–1984), a banker who served as U.S. Ambassador to Belgium from 1959 to 1961, and Shirley Carter Burden (1908–1989), a prominent photographer.
