= Burden Ironworks Office Building =

Historic commercial building in New York, United States

- U.S. National Register of Historic Places
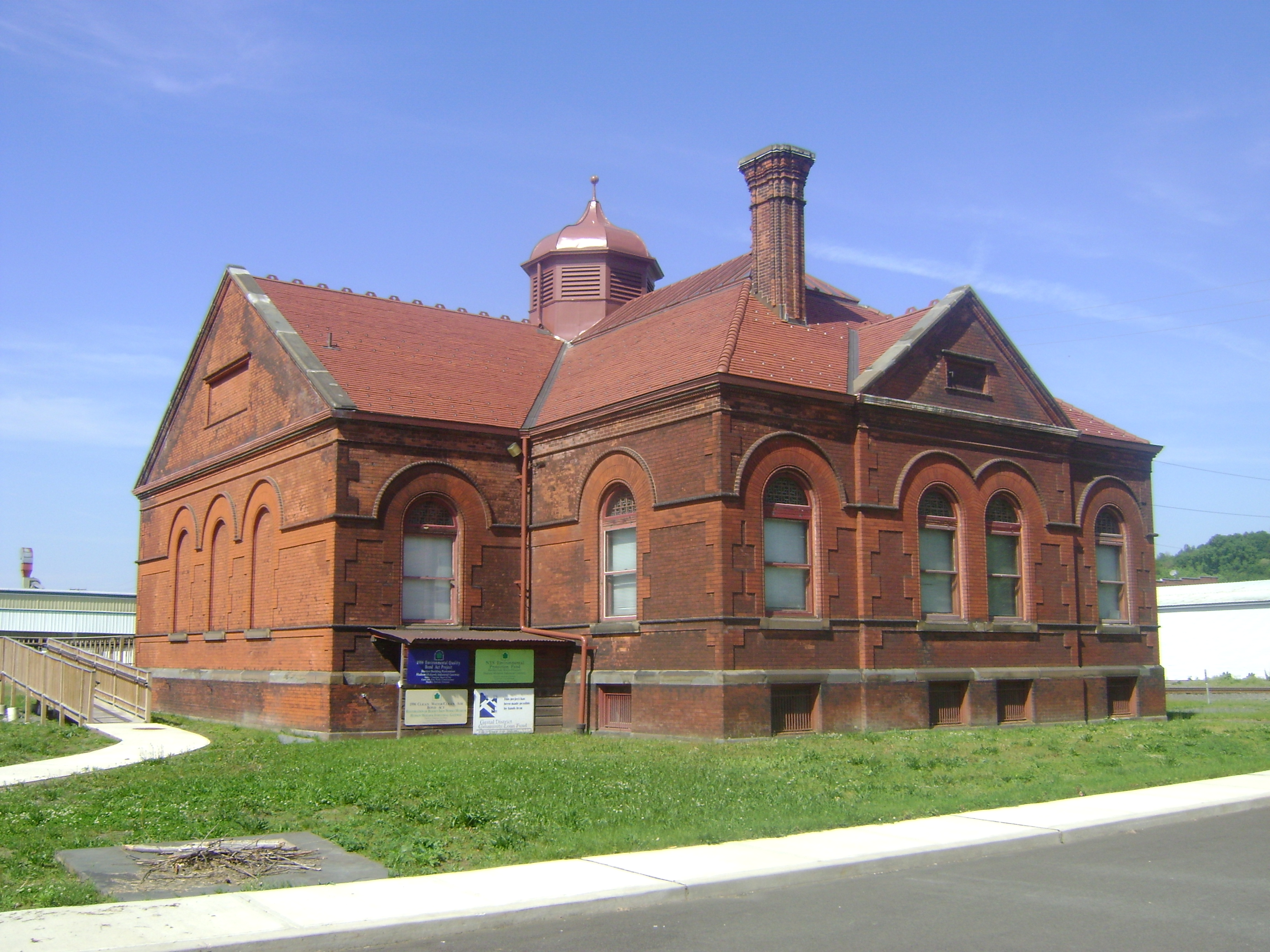
- Burden Iron Works office and museum, May 2010

- Location within New York Location within the United States
- Location: Polk St., Troy, New York
- Coordinates: 42°42′35″N 73°41′58″W
- Area: 0 acres (0 ha)
- Built: 1880
- NRHP reference No.: 72000907
- Added to NRHP: March 16, 1972

Burden Ironworks Office Building is a historic office building located in Troy, Rensselaer County, New York. It was built about 1880 and is a one-story, brick building laid out in a cruciform plan. It features gabled and hipped roofs and a central octagonal cupola and onion dome.

It was listed on the National Register of Historic Places in 1972.

== Gallery ==
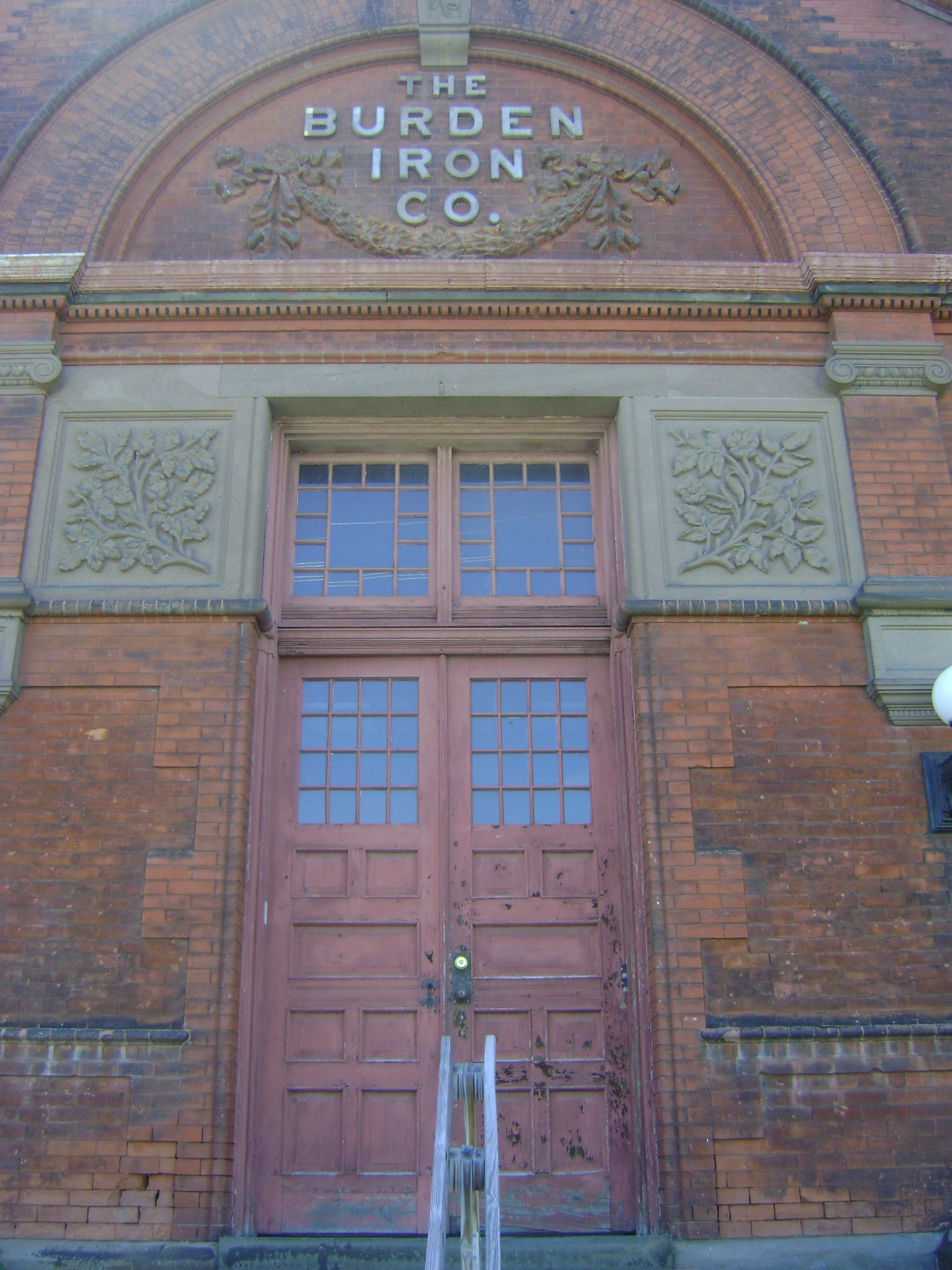
Entrance to the old office / museum
