= John Clifford Folger =

American diplomat

United States Ambassador to Belgium
- In office March 28, 1957 – September 11, 1959
- President: Dwight D. Eisenhower
- Preceded by: Frederick M. Alger Jr.
- Succeeded by: William A. M. Burden

Personal details
- Born: May 28, 1893 Sheldon, Iowa, U.S.
- Died: March 24, 1981 (aged 87) Washington, D.C., U.S.

John Clifford Folger (May 28, 1893 – March 24, 1981) was an American diplomat who served as the United States Ambassador to Belgium from 1957 to 1959.

== Early life ==
Folger was born on May 28, 1893, in Sheldon, Iowa.

== Career ==
Folger was appointed by President Dwight D. Eisenhower to the position of United States Ambassador to Belgium on March 28, 1957. The presentation of his credentials occurred on May 24, 1957. The termination of mission occurred on September 11, 1959.

== Personal life ==
Folger was Episcopalian.

== Death ==
Folger died on March 24, 1981, in Washington, D.C. He is interred at Washington National Cathedral.
