= Burden Iron Works =

Coordinates: 42.709859°N 73.698972°W

- Burden Iron Works Site
- U.S. National Register of Historic Places
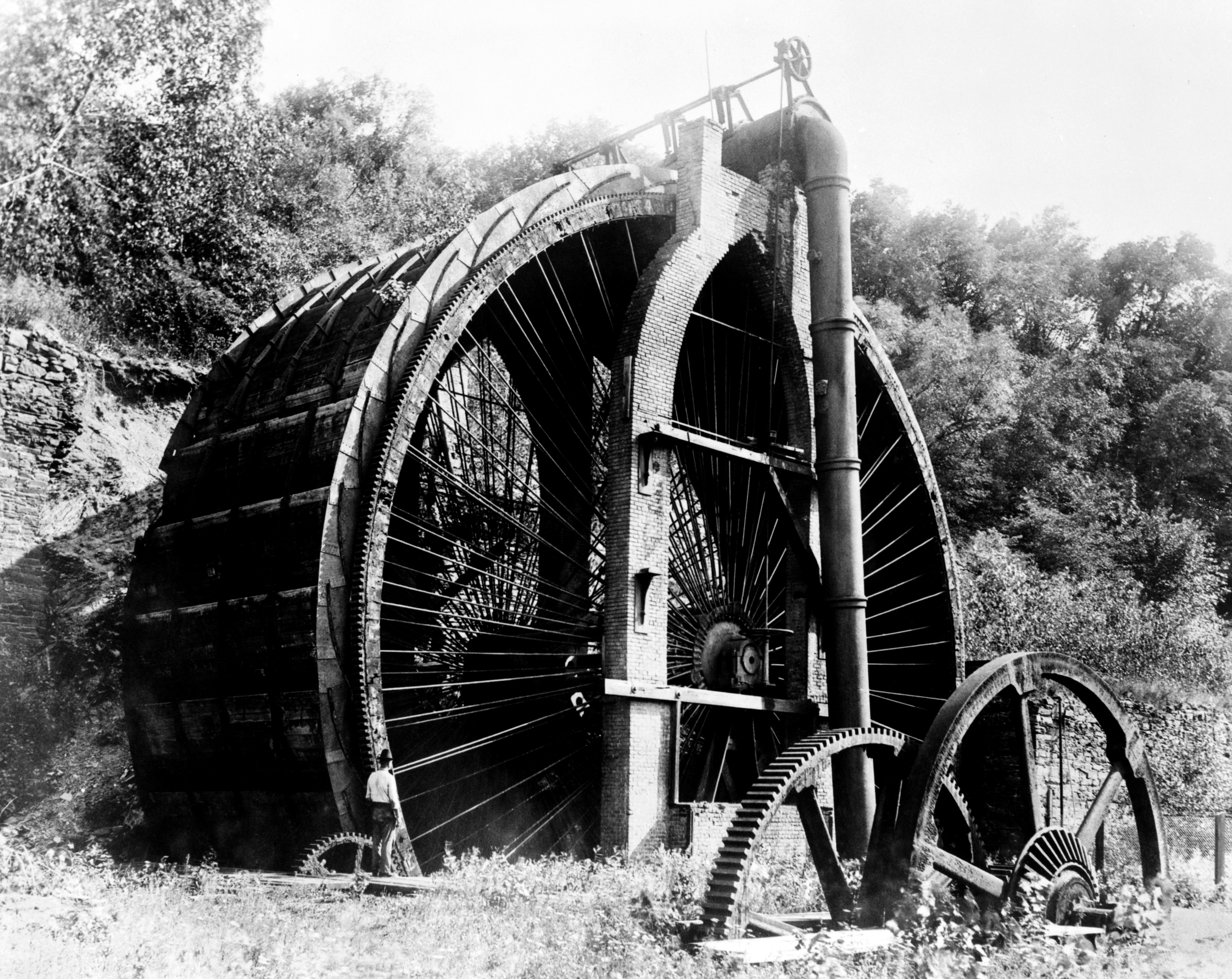
- Waterwheel at Burden Iron Works, Troy, NY

- Location within New York Location within the United States
- Nearest city: Troy, New York
- Area: 50 acres (20 ha)
- Built: 1813
- Architect: Burden, Henry
- NRHP reference No.: 77000977
- Added to NRHP: November 10, 1977

The Burden Iron Works was an iron works and industrial complex on the Hudson River and Wynantskill Creek in Troy, New York. It once housed the Burden Water Wheel, the most powerful vertical water wheel in history. It is widely believed that George Washington Gale Ferris Jr., inventor of the Ferris wheel, had occasion to observe the wheel while a student at Rensselaer Polytechnic Institute. The iron works site was listed on the National Register of Historic Places as an archaeological site in 1977. The Burden Ironworks Office Building was previously listed in 1972.

== Henry Burden ==
Henry Burden was born in Dunblane, Perthshire, Scotland, April 22, 1791, the son of a farmer. He studied engineering at the University of Edinburgh, and emigrated to America in 1819.

Burden started at the Townsend & Corning Foundry, manufacturers of cast iron plows and other agricultural implements, located in Albany. The next year, he invented an improved plow, and a cultivator, which was said to have been the first to be put into practical operation in this country. He also made mechanical improvements on threshing machines and grist mills.

He moved to Troy in 1822, and worked as superintendent of the Troy Iron and Nail Factory. The factory was located on north side of the Wynantskill Creek in South Troy, about a half-mile northeast of today's Troy–Menands Bridge. Burden's inventions, which automated work that was previously done by hand, made the factory extremely profitable. Burden soon became the sole owner of the factory and renamed it H. Burden and Sons. The Burden Iron Works, as it came to be known, produced a variety of iron-based products.

== Iron Works ==
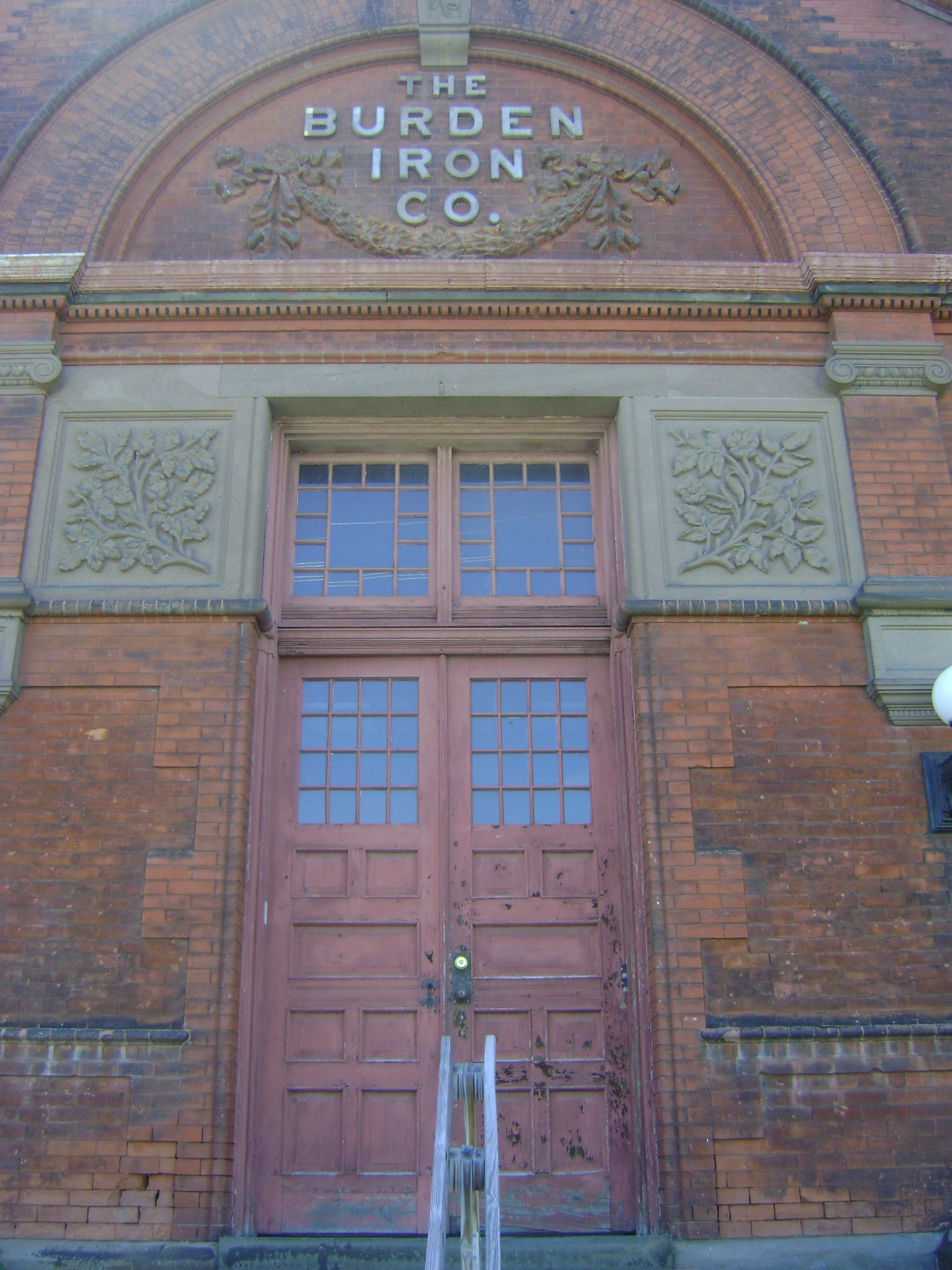
Entrance to the old office

Henry Burden realized that Troy's strategic location as a hub of rail and water transportation networks made it possible to produce and ship an enormous quantity of finished goods. Burden replaced the small wooden mill with a large millworks. The river adjacent to the works was shallow and full of bars, and the land along the river was low and frequently flooded. At great expense, Burden had the grounds filled in, and the river dredged, so that the company's docks were accessible to large vessels. The property had nearly a mile of river frontage. The Hudson River Railroad ran east of it.

In order to find the necessary power to run his foundry, in 1851 Burden designed and constructed a 60-foot wheel. This was not the largest water wheel of its type, but likely the most powerful. A larger water wheel is at Laxey on the Isle of Man and at Greenock, Scotland, the latter supplied by Shaw's Waterworks with water from an elevated reservoir. The Burden Wheel appears to have had more buckets. The Burden Water Wheel was sixty-two feet in diameter and twenty-two feet in breadth, was supplied by a small stream, the Wynantskill Creek. Burden originated a system of reservoirs along the Wynantskill Creek to hold the water in reserve and increase the water-supply to power the mills. Burden's wheel weighed 250 tons and could produce 500 horsepower when spinning 2.5 times a minute. The water wheel itself was of what came to be termed the "suspension" type, with iron rods in tension replacing the usual arms. It was made almost entirely of iron, save for the drum or soling of the wheel and its buckets. This great wheel was continuously in service night and day for nearly one half of a centuries. Following its abandonment in the 1890s, it lay idle for another twenty years before its final collapse. A local poet had called it 'the Niagara of Water-wheels' The American muralist Arthur Covey produced an etching of this water wheel titled The Great Wheel, South Troy.

The immense establishment comprised two works - the 'upper works,' or water mills, on the Wynantskill, a short distance east of the Hudson River, and the new works, called the 'lower works,' or steam mills, located on the 'farm company' property and the Hoyle farm. The Upper Works contained a rolling mill and puddling forge, a horseshoe factory, a warehouse which could store 7,000 tons of horseshoes, a rivet factory, a rivet warehouse, the stables, a supply store, and the general business office. The Lower Works contained two massive blast furnaces of brick and stone, each sixty-five feet high; two casting houses, two stock houses, an engine room, a puddling forge, a rolling mill, a swaging shop, a punching shop, a horseshoe warehouse, more offices, a machine shop, a blacksmith shop, a foundry, a pattern shop, a tin and plumbing shop, an iron warehouse, and a supply store with a draughting room and laboratory. Coal dust and smoke from the furnaces spread over the Iron Works district of Troy.

Together the two sites contained sixty puddling furnaces, twenty heating furnaces, fourteen trains of rolls, three rotary squeezers, nine horseshoe machines, twelve rivet machines which each produced eighty rivets a minute, ten large and fifteen small steam engines, seventy boilers, and the great water-wheel. The puddling furnaces employed hundreds of men, stripped to the waist, wearing hob-nailed shoes, and covered in coal dust. Boys worked at the swaging furnaces, removing the heated horseshoes with tongs and placing them on the revolving dies of the swaging machine. Burden's works manufactured horseshoes in a variety of patterns and sizes. They were packed for shipping 100 lbs. to a keg. A network of railroad tracks moved trainloads of iron ore, and sand among the blast furnaces and steam mills. The company owned its own locomotive.

The steam derricks, used for unloading coal, were designed by Burden's son William. A wire cable stretched between, on which an iron carriage traveled three hundred feet from the dock to the coal heap, carrying a self-dumping bucket with the capacity to hold a ton of coal. A steam engine hoisted the filled bucket to the cable, along which it traveled to the point where the tilting apparatus overturned its contents upon the pile. Alongside the coal heaps were vast deposits of iron ore, mostly from the area of Lake Champlain. There were also piles of limestone, from the downstream city of Hudson, used as flux to help in the fusion of the ores.

The firm owned 50 horses and a number of wagons to move the ore, coal, sand, clay, and manufactured goods from the different mills. It also owned extensive iron mines with superior quality ore, and a number of limestone quarries to serve the furnaces.

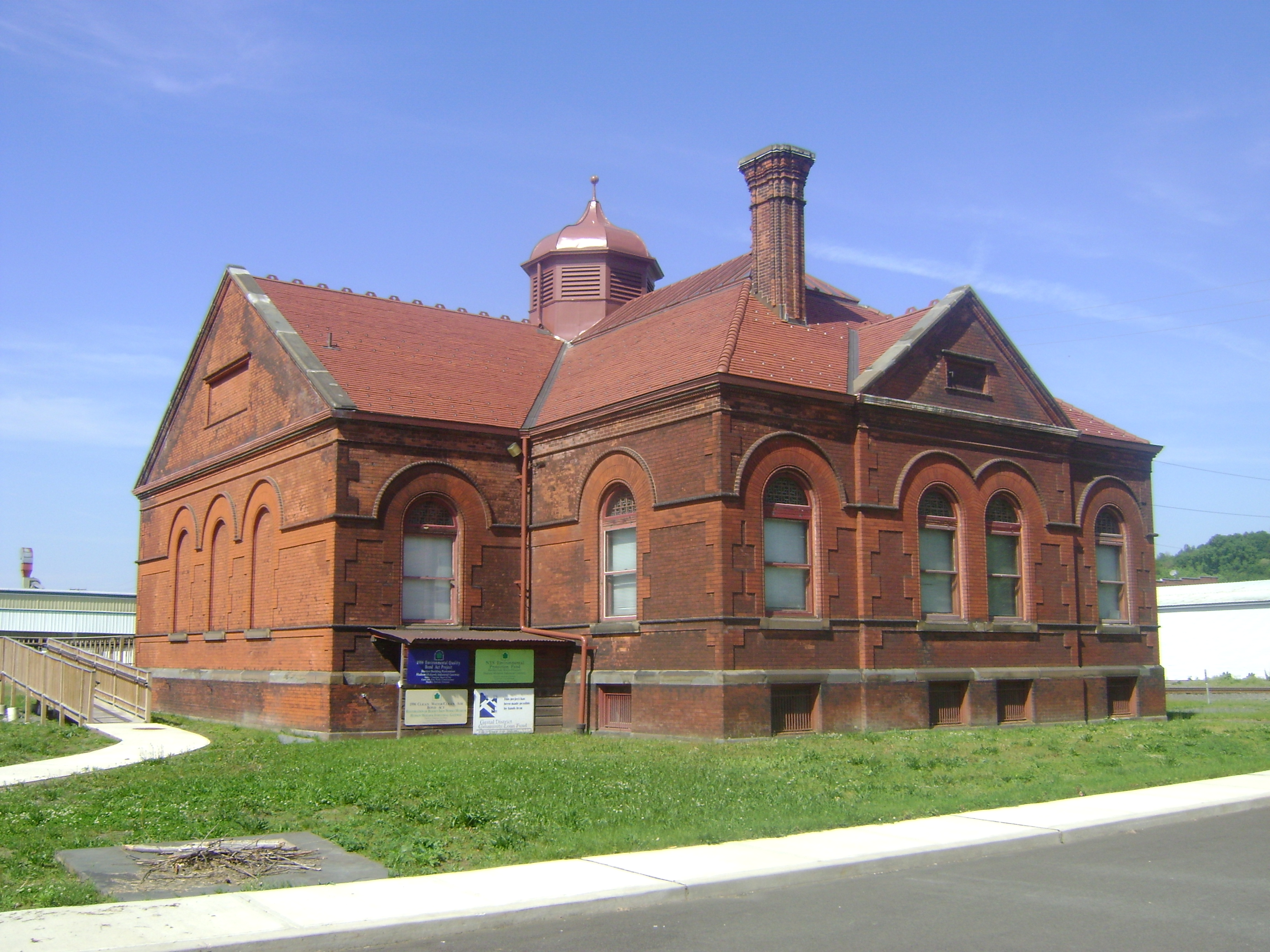
The office building

== Today ==
An exhibit on Greater Troy's industrial history is housed in the former office of the Burden Iron Works. Constructed 1881-2, the distinguished brick Romanesque Revival building contains examples of objects manufactured in the city throughout the 19th century. The museum is operated by the Hudson Mohawk Industrial Gateway. The museum is open to the public based on a regular schedule as well as by appointment. https://hudsonmohawkgateway.org/
