= Clarence Cary =

American lawyer

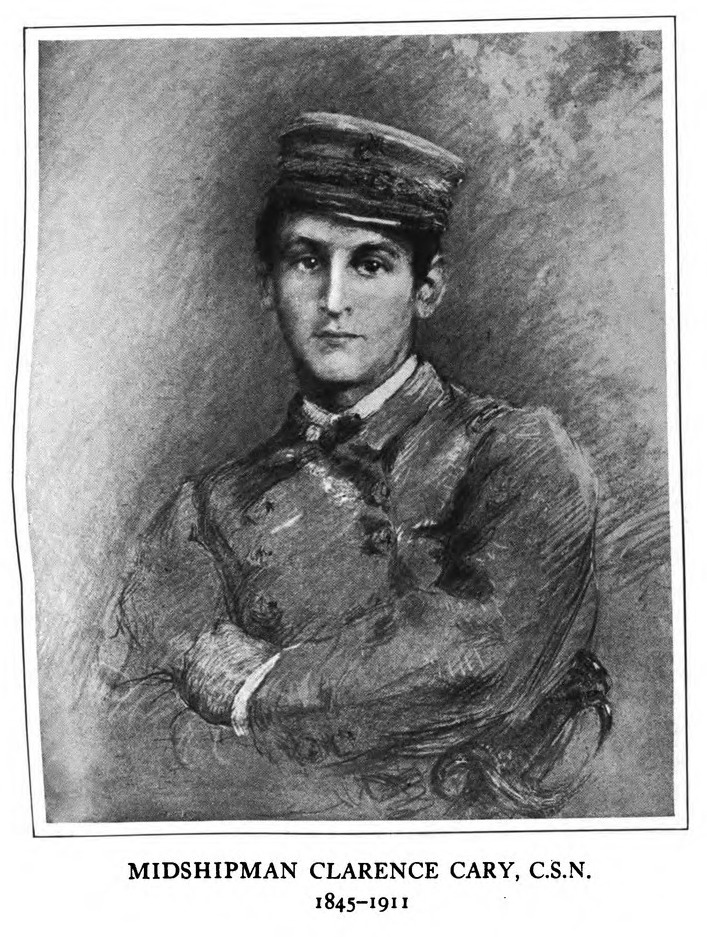
- Born: March 18, 1845; Fairfax County, Virginia, U.S.
- Died: August 27, 1911 (aged 66); Greenwich, Connecticut, U.S.
- Resting place: Ivy Hill Cemetery, Alexandria, Virginia
- Spouse: Elisabeth Miller Potter (m. 1878)
- Parent(s): Archibald Cary; Monimia Fairfax
- Relatives: Constance Cary Harrison (sister); Virginia Randolph (grandmother); Fairfax Harrison (nephew); Francis Harrison (nephew)

Clarence Cary (March 18, 1845 – August 27, 1911) was an American lawyer who was prominent in New York society during the Gilded Age.

== Early life ==
Clarence Cary was born in Fairfax County, Virginia on March 18, 1845, into a planter class family. His parents were Archibald Cary and Monimia (née Fairfax) Cary. His sister, the author Constance Cary, was married to Burton Harrison, the former private secretary for Confederate President Jefferson Davis. Through his sister, he was the uncle of Fairfax Harrison, who was a President of the Southern Railway Company, and Francis Burton Harrison, who served as a Governor-General of the Philippines. The family lived at Cumberland, Maryland, where his father was editor of its leading newspaper, The Cumberland Civilian.

His paternal grandparents were Wilson Jefferson Cary and Virginia (née Randolph) Cary. His maternal grandparents were Thomas Fairfax, 9th Lord Fairfax of Cameron (who never assumed the English title) and Margaret (née Herbert) Fairfax, herself the granddaughter of John Carlyle and Sarah Fairfax. Cary was also the great-grandnephew of Thomas Jefferson. Among his large and prominent family members was uncle Gouverneur Morris of Morrisania, who married Anne Cary Randolph.

When Archibald died in 1854, his mother moved the family to his grandmother's plantation, known as Vaucluse in Fairfax County, Virginia. Following the outbreak of the Civil War, Vaucluse was seized and torn down to construct Fort Worth as a part of the defenses of Washington, D.C. The family moved again to Richmond, Virginia, staying there during the War.

== Career ==
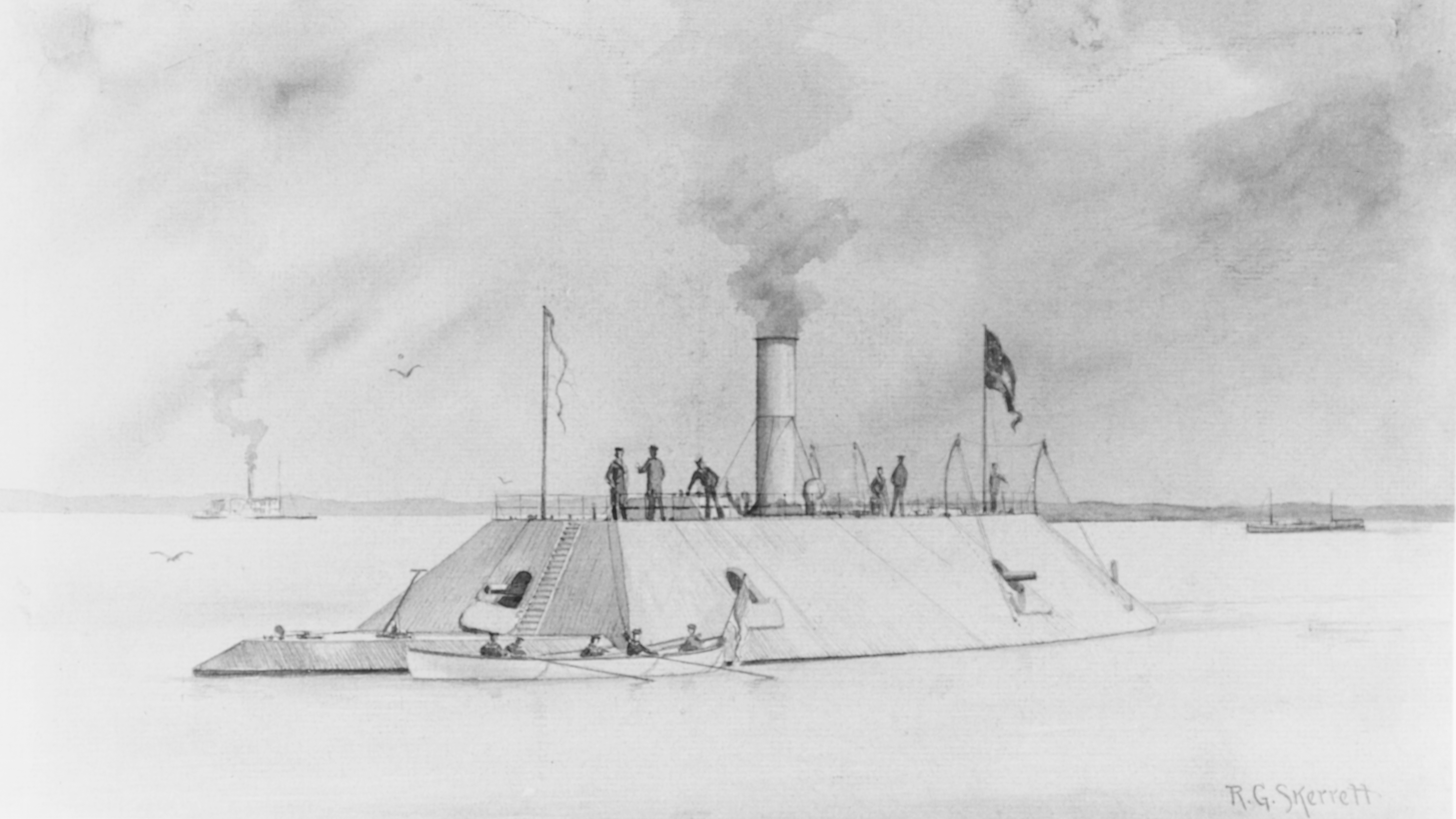
The CSS Palmetto State, of which Cary served on during the U.S. Civil War.

During the War, Cary served as a midshipman in the Confederate States Navy and reportedly, "did some very clever acting during the war on the amateur stage and on the naval war boards. In his sailor role he served on the blockade runner, Nashville, on the Palmetto State ironclad, off the Carolina coast and on the James River fleet, proving himself a good officer."

After the war, he studied law and practiced in New York, founding the successful firm of Cary & Whitridge, where he was a trusted advisor to Varina Davis, the widow of Jefferson Davis. Following his brother-in-law Harrison's return to the United States after the Civil War, they practiced law together.

Cary was a fan of Oriental culture and art, traveling for extended periods to the Far East, setting up a committee with other businessmen known as the "Committee on American Interests in China." He was known for ridiculing Secretary of State John Sherman by calling Sherman's reluctance to Chinese trade as "quaint and dangerous". He worked as the legal counsel for the American China Development Company, and helped found the American Asiatic Association in 1898.

=== Society life ===
In 1892, Cary and his wife were included in Ward McAllister's "Four Hundred", purported to be an index of New York's best families, published in The New York Times. Conveniently, 400 was the number of people that could fit into Mrs. Astor's ballroom.

He also translated several of the classic Latin poets, particularly Horace.

== Personal life ==
In 1878, Cary was married to Elisabeth Miller Potter (1856–1945), the daughter of Howard Potter, a diplomat and investment banker with Brown Bros. & Co., and his wife, Mary Louisa (née Brown) Potter. Together, they were the parents of:

- Guy Fairfax Cary (1879–1950), a lawyer with Shearman & Sterling who married Cynthia Burke Roche (1884–1966), the widow of Arthur Scott Burden, in 1922. Cynthia was the daughter of James Roche, 3rd Baron Fermoy and Frances Ellen Work.
- Howard Cary (1881–1906), a Harvard University graduate who reportedly committed suicide at the age of 24.

Cary died on August 27, 1911, in Greenwich, Connecticut. He was buried in Ivy Hill Cemetery, Alexandria, Virginia.

=== Descendants ===
Through his son Guy, he was the grandfather of Guy Fairfax Cary II (1923–2004), who died unmarried, and Cynthia Cary (b. 1924), who married Charles Bingham Penrose Van Pelt (1922–2003) and had three children. She later married Edwin F. Russell (1914–2001).
