= Cynthia Cary Van Pelt Russell =

American socialite (1924–2019)

Cynthia Russell
- Born: Cynthia Cary; October 16, 1924
- Died: November 24, 2019 (aged 95)
- Education: Chapin School
- Spouses: Charles B. P. Van Pelt (m. 1947, divorced) Edwin F. Russell (died 2001)
- Children: 3
- Parent(s): Guy Fairfax Cary; Cynthia Roche

Cynthia Cary Van Pelt Russell (October 16, 1924 – November 24, 2019) was an American socialite, who was part of American 'High Society' in New York and Newport, Rhode Island, and is a first cousin once removed of Diana, Princess of Wales.

== Early life ==
She is the daughter of Guy Fairfax Cary (1879–1950) and Cynthia Roche (1884–1966), who married in 1922. From her mother's first marriage to Arthur Scott Burden, she had an older half-sister, Eileen Burden. Her older brother was Guy Fairfax Cary Jr., who did not marry.

Her maternal grandparents were James Roche, 3rd Baron Fermoy and Frances Ellen Work, and her mother's siblings were Maurice Roche, 4th Baron Fermoy (the maternal grandfather of Diana, Princess of Wales), and the Hon. Francis Burke Roche. Her paternal grandparents were Elizabeth Miller Potter and Clarence Cary, who grew up at Vaucluse plantation with his sister, Constance Cary. Elisabeth Miller Potter was a granddaughter of Alonzo Potter. Her great-grandparents, Archibald Cary and Monimia Fairfax were a Southern planter aristocrat family. Archibald Cary was the son of Wilson Jefferson Cary and Virginia Randolph. Monimia Fairfax was the daughter of Thomas Fairfax, 9th Lord Fairfax of Cameron.

Cynthia's parents resided at 61 East 91st Street in Manhattan and at "Oak Hill" in Jericho, New York. She graduated from the Chapin School on the Upper East Side of Manhattan. During World War II, she served as a nurse's aide.

== Personal life ==
On August 23, 1947, she was married to Charles Bingham Penrose Van Pelt (1922–2003) at Trinity Protestant Episcopal Church in Newport, Rhode Island. Charles was the son of Andrew Van Pelt and Sarah Hannah Boies Penrose. A lawyer, he graduated from Groton, Harvard and the University of Pennsylvania Law School and served in the U.S. Army Military Intelligence in the Pacific during the War. Before their divorce, they had two sons and daughter:

- Peter Turner Van Pelt (b. 1948), a writer.
- Guy Fairfax Cary Van Pelt (b. 1957), who married Mary McGill duBose Adickes, the daughter of Mrs. Thomas Walter Blake and David Pryor Adickes, in 2000.
- Abby Ann Van Pelt, who married Jay R. Feldman, in 1982.

She later married Edwin F. Russell (1914–2001), an American newspaper publisher. He had previously been married to Lady Sarah Spencer-Churchill, daughter of John Spencer-Churchill, 10th Duke of Marlborough from 1943 until their divorce in 1966. Winston Spencer Churchill, a grandson of the prime minister, served as a page at the wedding. He married Iris Paine (daughter of Ambassador Earl E. T. Smith) after Lady Sarah and before Cynthia.

She died in Mystic, Connecticut, on November 24, 2019.

=== Residence ===
Russell's home in Newport, "Elm Court" was featured in a Style article of The New York Times about the updating of classic homes in that rarified community. She was an active member of the Preservation Society of Newport County.

Ancestors of Cynthia Cary Van Pelt Russell

16. Wilson Jefferson Cary
8. Archibald Cary
17. Virginia Randolph
4. Clarence Cary
18. Thomas Fairfax, 9th Lord Fairfax of Cameron
9. The Honourable Monimia Fairfax
19. Margaret Herbert
2. Guy Fairfax Cary
20. Alonzo Potter
10. Howard Potter
21. Sarah Nott, daughter of Eliphalet Nott
5. Elisabeth Miller Potter
22. James Brown, co-founder of Brown Bros. & Co.
11. Mary Louisa Brown
23. Eliza Mary Coe
1. Cynthia Cary
24. Edward Roche
12. Edmond Roche, 1st Baron Fermoy
25. Margaret Honoria Curtain
6. James Roche, 3rd Baron Fermoy
26. James Brownell Boothby
13. Elizabeth Boothby
27. Charlotte Cunningham
3. The Honourable Cynthia Roche
28. John Wark
14. Franklin H. Work
29. Sarah Duncan Boude
7. Frances Ellen Work
30. John Wood
15. Ellen Wood
31. Ellen Strong
