= Thomas Robins (inventor) =

American inventor

Thomas Robins Jr.
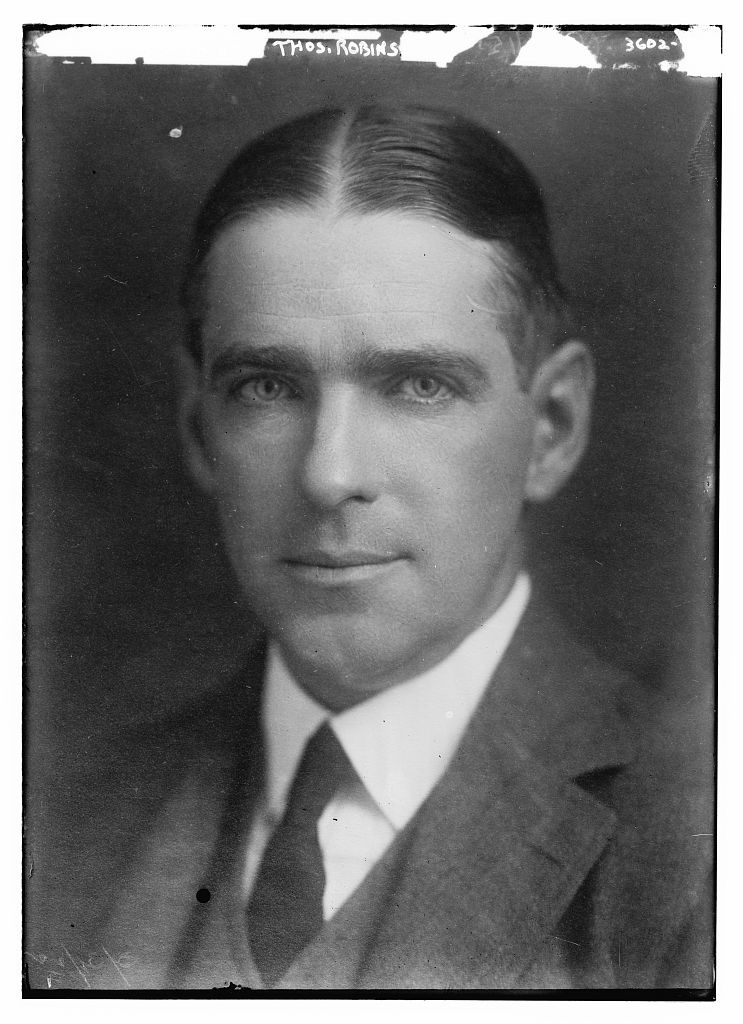
- Robins in 1915
- Born: September 1, 1868; West Point, New York, U.S.
- Died: November 4, 1957 (aged 89); Stamford, Connecticut, U.S.
- Education: Princeton University
- Known for: Conveyor belt
- Spouse: Winifred Hamilton Tucker
- Parent(s): Thomas Robins, Sr.

Thomas Robins Jr. (September 1, 1868 – November 4, 1957) was an American inventor and manufacturer.

== Biography ==
He was born on September 1, 1868, in West Point, New York to Thomas Robins Sr. He attended Princeton University.

== Career ==
In 1891, Robins began work on a conveyor belt for carrying coal and ore for Thomas Edison and his Edison Ore-Milling Company in Ogdensburg, New Jersey. His conveyor belt received the grand prize at the Paris Exposition in 1900, and first prizes at the Pan-American Exposition and Saint Louis Exposition.

Based on his invention, Robins started the Robins Conveying Belt Company and of the Robins New Conveyor Company (now ThyssenKrupp Robins). In 1915 he was appointed to the Naval Consulting Board.

== Personal life ==
On April 26, 1894, Robins married Winifred Hamilton Tucker (1868–1952) in Boston, Massachusetts. They lived together at 40 East 66th Street in New York City and had a home in Stamford, Connecticut, called Saddle Rock House designed by prominent New York City architects, Hunt and Hunt. Together with his wife, he had:

- Thomas Robins III "Jr" (1897–1977), who in 1939 married Louisa Winslow Cogswell (1899–1962), an artist. She was the daughter of Cullen Van Rensselaer Cogswell and Agnes Eugenia Nickerson. Her paternal grandparents were Andrew Kirkpatrick Cogswell (1839–1900) and Mary Van Rensselaer Cogswell (1839–1871). After her death, he married Eileen Burden Maynard (1910–1970), daughter of Cynthia Roche (1884–1966) and the granddaughter of James Roche, 3rd Baron Fermoy (1852–1920) and Frances Ellen Work (1857–1947)
  - Louisa Robins (1920–1992), who married Austin Goodyear (1920–2005) in 1939. After Louisa passed away, Goodyear married Sara Suleri
    - Grace Rumsey Goodyear (b. 1941), who in 1962 married Franklin Delano Roosevelt III (b. 1938), grandson of Franklin Delano Roosevelt and Eleanor Roosevelt
    - Cullen Goodyear, a noted triathlon athlete
    - Thomas R. Goodyear, who was married to Barbara Marshall (1946–2007)
  - Mary Van Rensselaer Robins (1919–2006), who married Dr. Stephen Goodyear (1915–1998). They divorced in 1963 and in 1964, Mary married Julian McKee (1918–2006)
  - Anne Davis Robins, who married Evan W. Thomas II in 1943, son of Norman Thomas and Frances Violet Stewart.
    - Evan Welling Thomas III (b. 1951)
- Samuel Davis Robins, who married Emma Lawrence Jacob in 1925. She was the daughter of Bartholomew Jacob. One of Robin's groomsmen was Frederic W. Lincoln IV Jacob later married Joseph R. Busk in 1937
  - Samuel Davis Robins, Jr. (1926–2010) who was married to Winifred Anne Willis in 1950 and Ruth R. McCollester, in 1979; both of whom he divorced. His companion at the time of his death was Mary Hooker Judson
    - Samuel Davis Robins III
    - Leah Anne Robins (b. 1956)
    - Abigail Cope Robins

He died on November 4, 1957, at the Nestledown Convalescent Home in Stamford, Connecticut, aged 89.
