= Cynthia Cary =

British-American socialite and art collector

The Honourable Cynthia Cary
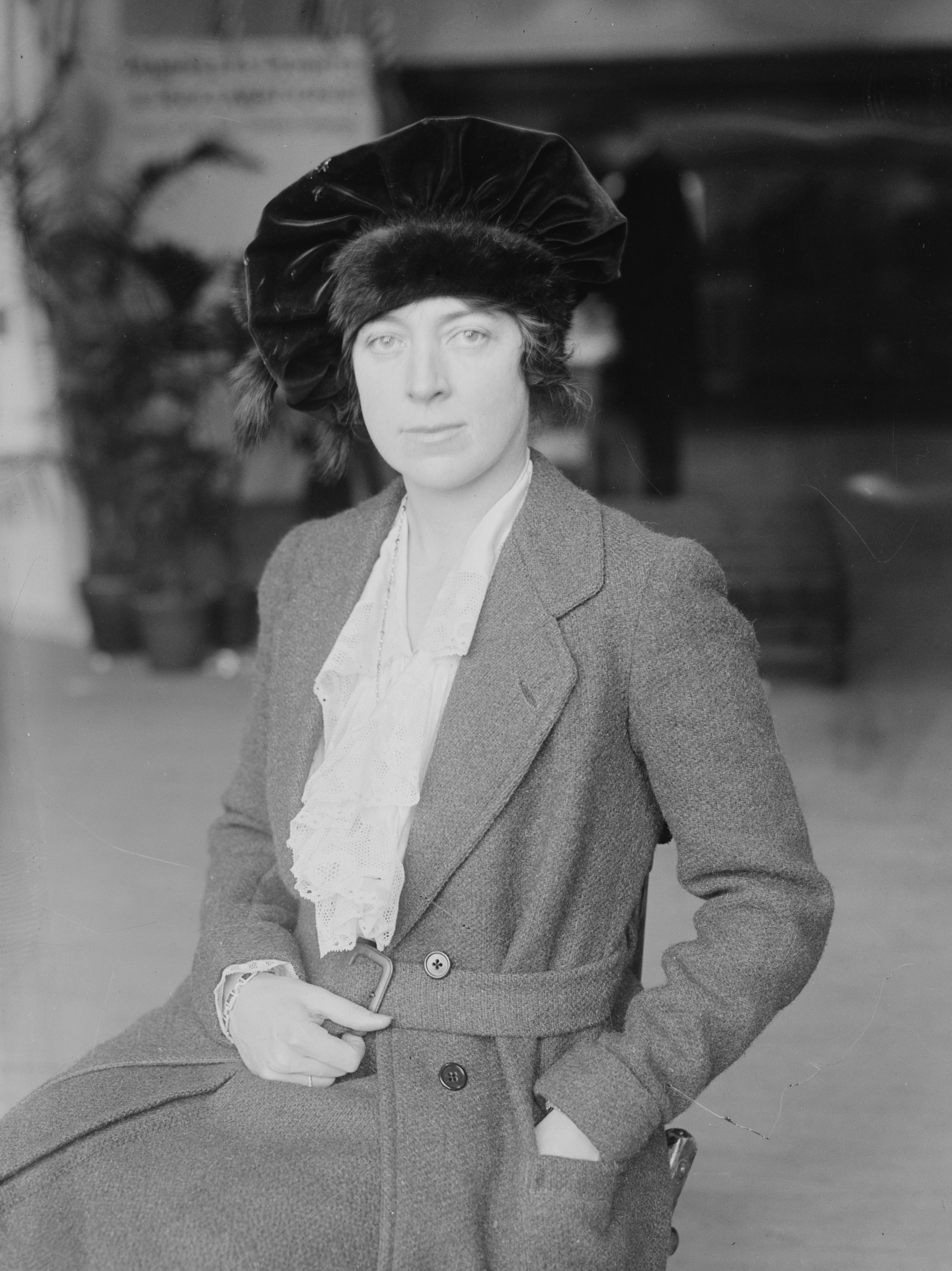
- Roche at the International Flower Show in New York, 1918
- Born: Cynthia Burke Roche; 10 April 1884; London, England
- Died: 18 December 1966 (aged 82); Newport, Rhode Island, U.S.
- Occupation: Art collector
- Political party: Republican
- Spouses: Arthur Scott Burden (m. 1906; died 1921) Guy Fairfax Cary (after 1922)
- Children: Eileen Burden; Guy Fairfax Cary Jr.; Cynthia Cary Van Pelt Russell
- Parents: James Roche, 3rd Baron Fermoy; Frances Ellen Work

Cynthia Burke Cary (née Roche, previously Burden; 10 April 1884 – 18 December 1966) was a British-American socialite and art collector from Newport, Rhode Island.

== Life and work ==
She was born on 10 April 1884 in London to James Roche, 3rd Baron Fermoy (1852–1920), an Irish peer who was a Member of Parliament in the House of Commons, and Frances Ellen Work (1857–1947), an American heiress and socialite. Her brothers were Maurice Roche, 4th Baron Fermoy, the maternal grandfather of Diana, Princess of Wales, and the Hon. Francis Burke Roche.

In 1904, Good Housekeeping magazine described her as among the members of New York's Four Hundred (see The Four Hundred (1892)) who were daring and skilful automobilists. Roche was also recognised as a skilled tennis player and horserider.

In 1908, Roche became a naturalised United States citizen.

== Personal life ==
On 11 June 1906, Roche married Arthur Scott Burden. Burden was the grandson of industrialist Henry Burden and President of the family business Burden Iron Works. His career, however, was significantly impaired after two horse falls, the second of which seriously aggravated the injuries incurred from the first. As a result of these injuries, Burden was placed under constant care from late 1913, and James A. Burden Jr., Arthur Burden's brother, filed a petition in Cynthia Roche's absence, (as both she and her daughter were in London at the time), requesting that Arthur Burden be declared incompetent. Burden died from pneumonia in June 1921. The couple had a daughter:

- Eileen Burden (1910–1970), who married investment banker Walter Maynard (d. 1971), a son of Walter E. Maynard, and had three children. They later divorced and in 1963, she married Thomas Robins. Robins was the son of Thomas Robins, inventor of the conveyor belt.

In 1922, after her first husband's death, Roche married Guy Fairfax Cary Sr. (1879–1950) and they honeymooned at the fishing lodge of Robert Walton Goelet. Cary, a lawyer who was a partner with Shearman & Sterling, was the son of Clarence Cary and Elisabeth Miller Potter. His father and aunt, Constance Cary (1843–1920), were the children of Archibald Cary and Monimia Fairfax. Together, they had two children:

- Guy Fairfax Cary Jr. (1923–2004), who died unmarried.
- Cynthia Cary (1924–2019), who married Charles Bingham Penrose Van Pelt (1922–2003) and had three children. She later married Edwin F. Russell (1914–2001), who had four children.

Cynthia died at her home in Newport, aged 82, on 18 December 1966. She left an estate valued at $300,000. Her home and the residue of her estate were received by her son, Guy Fairfax Cary Jr.

=== Descendants ===
Through her eldest daughter, she was the grandmother of Sheila Maynard, a clinical social worker who worked in Islamabad, married Nicholas Platt, a career diplomat who served as US ambassador to Pakistan, Zambia and the Philippines, and had 3 sons: Adam Platt, a New York magazine restaurant critic, Oliver Platt (b. 1960), the actor, and Nicholas Platt Jr. Also through her eldest daughter, she was the grandmother to Walter Maynard Jr., an investment advisor with Morgan Stanley who married Pamela S. Silver in 1954 and has issue, and John Maynard.

=== Legacy ===
In 1981, the Redwood Library received her collected art as the Cynthia Cary Collection. It was donated by her son, Guy Fairfax Cary Jr. The art collection was amassed over decades by her. The collection was previously exhibited at Rhode Island School of Design and Christie's in Manhattan.
