= Jesse Burton Harrison =

American lawyer

Jesse Burton Harrison (1805–1841) was an American anti-slavery lawyer and author.

== Biography ==
Jesse Burton Harrison was born in 1805 in Lynchburg, Virginia. His father, Samuel Jordan Harrison (1771–1846), was a well-to-do tobacco merchant, friend of Thomas Jefferson, who had helped to build the University of Virginia. "As a young man he was a habitué at Monticello. James Madison was his patron." Jesse was educated at Hampden–Sydney College and later at the Harvard Law School, where he was influenced by George Ticknor. He practiced law in Lynchburg. Failing to obtain an appointment as professor at the University of Virginia, in 1828 he traveled to Europe with a letter of introduction from Secretary of State Martin Van Buren. He met Lafayette, Talleyrand, Benjamin Constant, Schlegel, and Goethe, and spent a year studying at the University of Göttingen. He later moved to New Orleans, Louisiana, where he helped to found the Louisiana Historical Society, and edited the Louisiana Law Reports and the Whig newspaper Louisiana Advertiser.

== Writings ==
Harrison delivered a series of literary addresses and then, in the late 1820s, began publicly supporting anti-slavery thought. He published an appeal on behalf of the American Colonization Society in 1827. Most importantly, he wrote a response to Thomas Roderick Dew's pro-slavery essay, Review of the Debates in the Virginia Legislature, 1831-2.

== Death and legacy ==
Harrison died of yellow fever in 1841 in New Orleans.

He was the father of Burton Harrison, a Confederate official and lawyer, and the grandfather of Fairfax Harrison and Francis Burton Harrison. His wife was the former Frances Anne Brand (†1884).

== Writing of Harrison ==
- Harrison, Jesse Burton (1992) [First published 1982]. "English Civilization". In O'Brien, Michael (ed.). All Clever Men, Who Make Their Way: Critical Discourse in the Old South. University of Georgia Press. pp. 55–88. ISBN 9780820314907.
