= Arthur Scott Burden =

American banker and equestrian

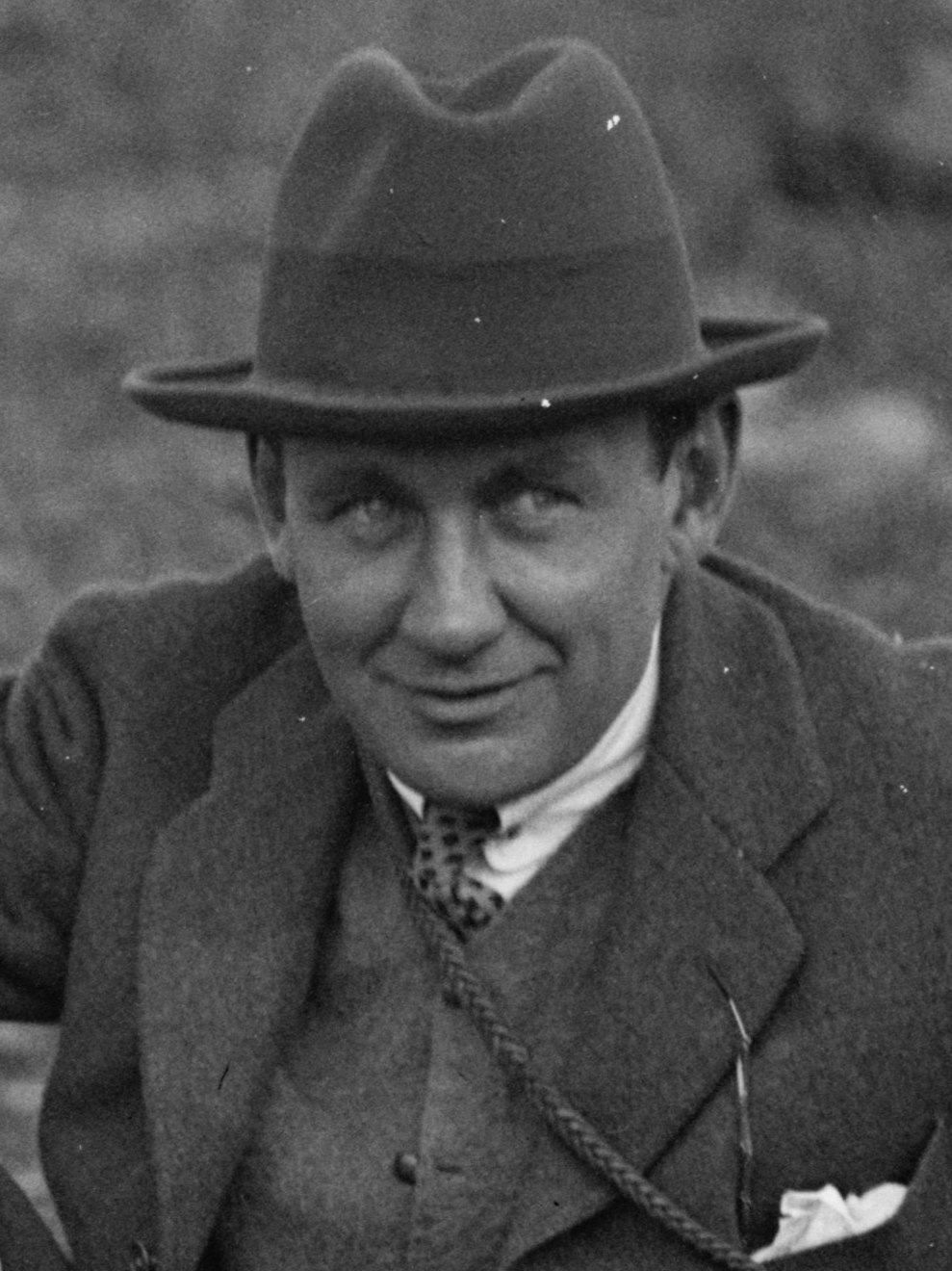
- Born: August 11, 1879; Troy, New York, U.S.
- Died: June 16, 1921 (aged 41); White Plains, New York, U.S.
- Education: Harvard University
- Spouse: Hon. Cynthia Burke Roche (m. 1906)
- Children: Eileen Burden
- Parent(s): James Abercrombie Burden Sr. Mary Margaret Proudfit Irvin
- Relatives: I. Townsend Burden (uncle); James A. Burden Jr. (brother); William Fletcher Burden (uncle); Irvin McDowell (uncle); Henry Burden (grandfather); Richard Irvin (grandfather)

Arthur Scott Burden (August 11, 1879 – June 15, 1921) was an American banker, equestrian, and member of the young set of New York society during the Gilded Age.

== Early life ==
Burden was born on August 11, 1879, in Troy, New York. He was the youngest of four sons born to James Abercrombie Burden Sr. (1833–1906) and Mary Margaret Proudfit (née Irvin) Burden (1837–1920). His siblings included James A. Burden Jr., who married Florence Adele Sloane (daughter of Emily Thorn Vanderbilt); Richard Irvin Burden; and William Proudfit Burden, who married Natica Belmont (daughter of Oliver Belmont).

Burden was a grandson of merchant Richard Irvin and Scottish born entrepreneur Henry Burden, who founded Burden Iron Works of Troy, of which his brother James later served as the president of beginning in 1906. Among his relatives was uncle William Fletcher Burden, uncle-in-law Gen. Irvin McDowell, and uncle I. Townsend Burden, who was prominent in New York society and was a member of the 400 of New York Society, as dictated by Mrs. Astor and Ward McAllister and published in The New York Times on February 16, 1892.

Burden graduated from Harvard University with a S.B. in 1903.

== Career ==
Following his graduation from Harvard, Burden was connected with the Iron Works which his father and grandfather had been president of. He later purchased a seat on the New York Stock Exchange and became a banker, working until his fall from during a hunting trip in England and then from a horse while playing polo at his estate in Jericho on Long Island, in 1913.

=== Society life ===
Along with his wife Cynthia, brother William, sister-in-law Natica, and close friends Reginald Vanderbilt and Alfred Vanderbilt, he was part of a notable group of the younger set in society, both in New York City and Newport, Rhode Island. His wife and sister-in-law were very close friends and "were girls of exceptional charm and vivacity and few rivals for popularity at the dances and other entertainments of those days."

Besides Arthur, many members of the group died early deaths, including sister-in-law Natica Rives Belmont (adopted daughter of George L. Rives and stepdaughter of Alva Vanderbilt Belmont) who died in 1908 of asphyxiation a few months after her marriage to William, Alfred, who died aboard the RMS Lusitania in 1915, and Reginald (father of Gloria Vanderbilt), who died from cirrhosis due to alcoholism in 1925.

== Personal life ==
On June 11, 1906, he was married to the Hon. Cynthia Burke Roche (1884–1966), the daughter of James Roche, 3rd Baron Fermoy, an Irish peer who was a Member of Parliament in the House of Commons, and Frances Ellen née Work, an American heiress and socialite. Among her siblings was brother Maurice Roche, 4th Baron Fermoy, the maternal grandfather of Diana, Princess of Wales. Together, they were the parents of a daughter:

- Eileen Burden (1910–1970), who married investment banker Walter Maynard (1906–1971), a son of Walter E. Maynard, in 1932. They later divorced and in 1963, she married Thomas Robins (1897–1977). Robins was the son of Thomas Robins, inventor of the conveyor belt.

In late 1913, Burden fell twice from his horse and sustained injuries that caused him to be placed under constant care. As a result, in May 1921, his brother James filed a petition while his sister-in-law, Cynthia Roche's, was away in London, requesting that he be declared incompetent. Later that month, a sheriff's jury found Burden to be "incompetent to care for his person and property." Arthur, however, died shortly thereafter, at a branch of the New York Hospital in White Plains, New York, from pneumonia on June 15, 1921. He left his entire estate to his widow. Coincidentally, ten years later in 1931, his brother James was also injured in a fall, and died the following year of an embolism as a consequence of the fall.

A year after his death, his widow Cynthia was remarried to Guy Fairfax Cary Sr. and became the mother of two more children, Guy Fairfax Cary II and Cynthia Cary, who married Charles Bingham Penrose Van Pelt, and later, the newspaper publisher Edwin Fairman Russell. Russell was previously married to Lady Sarah Consuelo Spencer-Churchill, daughter of John Spencer-Churchill, 10th Duke of Marlborough.

=== Descendants ===
Through his daughter Eileen, he was the grandfather of Sheila Maynard, a clinical social worker who worked in Islamabad. She married Nicholas Platt (b. 1936), a career diplomat who served as U.S. Ambassador to Pakistan, Zambia and the Philippines. They are the parents of New York Magazine restaurant critic Adam Platt, actor Oliver Platt (b. 1960), and Nicholas Platt, Jr.
