= Howard Potter =

- Born: July 8, 1826; Schenectady, New York, U.S.
- Died: March 24, 1897 (aged 70); London, England
- Education: Union College
- Occupations: Banker, diplomat, philanthropist
- Spouse: Mary Louisa Brown (m. 1849)
- Children: 9
- Parent(s): Alonzo Potter; Maria Nott Potter
- Relatives: Clarkson Nott Potter (brother); Robert Brown Potter (brother); Edward T. Potter (brother); William A. Potter (brother); Henry C. Potter (brother); Eliphalet Nott (grandfather); Horatio Potter (uncle)

Howard Potter (July 8, 1826 – March 24, 1897) was an American industrialist, investment banker, diplomat and philanthropist, and a partner in Brown Bros. & Co.

== Early life ==
Potter was born in Schenectady, New York on July 8, 1826. He was the second son of Alonzo Potter and Maria (née Nott) Potter (1799–1839). After his mother's death in 1839, following the birth of her seventh child, Howard and his siblings were placed under the care of his mother's cousin, Sarah Benedict, who became his father's second wife in 1840 and with whom he had three more children. Among his siblings were U.S. Representative Clarkson Nott Potter, General Robert Brown Potter, architects Edward Tuckerman Potter and William Appleton Potter, university president Dr. Eliphalet Nott Potter, Bishop Henry Codman Potter, and sister Maria Louisa Potter, who married sculptor Launt Thompson and lived in Italy. His father was a professor and later vice president of Union College before becoming the Episcopal Bishop of Pennsylvania.

His maternal grandparents were Sarah Marie (née Benedict) Nott and Dr. Eliphalet Nott, a Presbyterian minister who served as President of Union College for more than sixty years. His paternal grandparents were Anne Brown (née Knight) Potter and Joseph Potter, a farmer whose Puritan ancestors emigrated from England to Portsmouth, Rhode Island in the 1600s. Among his many distinguished relatives included Nathan Hale, the patriot schoolmaster, and uncle Horatio Potter, the Episcopal Bishop of the New York.

== Career ==
In 1842, Potter entered Union College, of which his grandfather was still serving as president, and graduated in 1846. After his graduation, he remained at Union for a year as a tutor in Latin and Greek. Potter later he studied law and was admitted to the New York Bar, but gave up the practice of law to become Secretary and Treasurer of the Novelty Iron Works, then the most notable iron works in the U.S. After his 1849 marriage, he spent six months or more as an attaché at the Court of Berlin, Prussia.

In 1859, at the invitation of his father-in-law James Brown, he entered the firm of Brown Brothers & Company, becoming a partner in 1861. Potter was active in the merchant banking houses of Brown Bros. & Co. and Brown, Shipley & Co., the British wing of the Brown banking business. At the time of his death, he was the head of Brown Shipley in London.

=== Philanthropy and social life ===
Potter was a prominent member of charitable organizations throughout his career, serving as a trustee of the Children's Aid Society from 1857 to 1897; president of the Orthopedic Dispensary from 1878 to 1891; president of the Association for Improving the Condition of the Poor from 1878 to 1884; president of the Niagara Park Association; treasurer of the United States Sanitary Commission; one of the managers of St. Luke's Hospital from 1869 to 1886; treasurer of St. Johnland from 1871 to 1883; first vice-president of the State Charities Aid from 1874 to 1880; trustee of his alma mater Union College, among other charitable and educational institutions.

He was also a founding member of both the Metropolitan Museum of Art and the American Museum of Natural History in New York City and was a member of the Century Association, the New York Yacht Club, the Downtown Club, the University Club and the Tuxedo Club.

== Personal life ==
In 1849, Potter was married to Mary Louisa Brown (1827–1898), the daughter of James Brown and Louisa Kirkland (née Benedict) Brown, the youngest sister of Potter's grandmother, both daughters of the Rev. Joel Benedict. Mary's half-brother was fellow Brown Bros. & Co. partner, John Crosby Brown. Together, they were the parents of nine children, seven of whom lived to adulthood, including:

- James Brown Potter (1853–1922), who married actress Cora Urquhart in 1877.
- Maria Potter (1855–1939), who married banker John Kennedy Tod.
- Elizabeth Miller Potter (1856–1945), who married lawyer Clarence Cary.
- Grace Howard Potter (1858–1937), who did not marry and left her estate to two nieces.
- Howard Cranston Potter (1864–1896), husband of Alice Kershaw Potter, rather than work for the family business represented his father in law Milwaukee grain broker Charles James Kershaw in Tacoma, Washington. He died in a mysterious manner in San Francisco while staying at Cliff House.
- Bertha Howard Potter (1866–1933), who married Robert Shaw Minturn Jr. in 1906.
- Ashton Howard Potter (1870–1914), a "Wyoming cattle king" who married Mary Louise McNutt (1872–1947). They divorced and he married Grace Goodyear (1872–1914), the former wife of Ganson Depew (nephew of Chauncey Depew) in 1910.

Potter died in London, England on March 24, 1897. In his will, he left all of his property to his wife and specifically cut off his daughter-in-law Cora, and all children born to her since January 1, 1880. He named his wife, eldest son James, and son-in-laws John and Clarence as his executors. His widow died in 1898 at her home on Park Avenue in New York City.

=== Descendants ===
Through his son Howard Cranston Potter, he was the grandfather of Bertha Marie Potter Paschall Boeing (1891–1977), who married twice; first to Nathaniel Paschall, and second to aviationist William Boeing, with whom she had William E. Boeing Jr. (1922–2015).
