= Ira G. Rawn =

American rail executive (1855–1910)

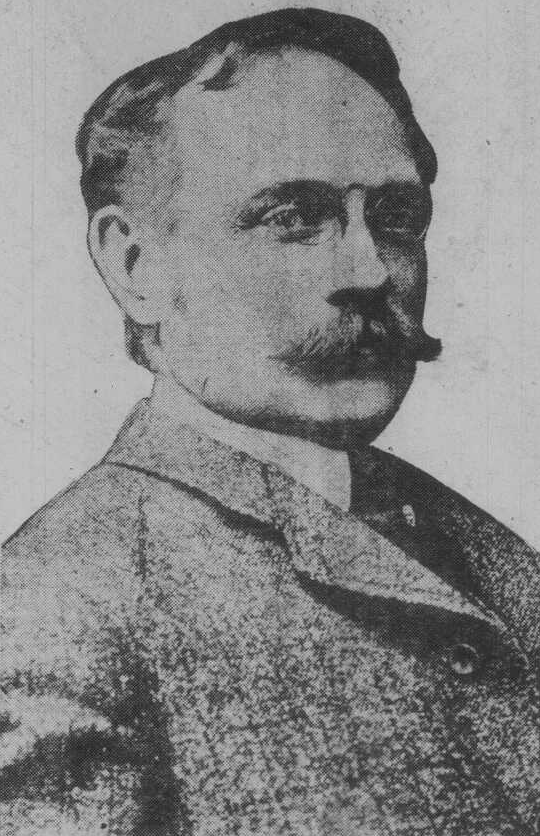
- Born: August 20, 1855; Delaware, Ohio, US
- Died: July 20, 1910 (aged 54); Winnetka, Illinois, US
- Occupation: Railroad executive

Ira Griffith Rawn (August 20, 1855 – July 20, 1910) was General Manager of Baltimore and Ohio Railroad from 1904 to 1907, vice president of Illinois Central Railroad from 1907 to 1909 and president of Monon Railroad from November 1909 until his death.

== Early life and career ==
Ira G. Rawn was born on August 20, 1855, in Delaware, Ohio, the son of Peter and Sarah Rawn.

By 1870, at age 15, Ira Rawn was listed in the 1870 U.S. census as a telegraph operator. Rawn began his railway career with the Big Four Railroad in 1880 as a telegraph operator and was subsequently promoted to trainmaster. In 1887 he took the position of Master of Transportation for Kentucky Central Railroad. In 1889 he became the Division Superintendent and Superintendent of Transportation for Chesapeake and Ohio Railway, then became General Superintendent of Baltimore and Ohio Railroad's (B&O) Southwestern division in 1890. In 1904 Rawn was appointed General Manager of the B&O. He left the B&O to become the Vice President of Operations for Illinois Central Railroad in 1907, then was elected president of the Monon Railroad in 1909. His term as president of the Monon began on November 1, 1909, and ended with his death on July 20, 1910.

=== Car repair contract scandal ===
The Illinois Central filed suit in Chicago Circuit Court on June 6, 1910, alleging that when it closed its own car repair shops in 1906, several executives of the railroad conspired to defraud it of large amounts of money through overcharging on repair contracts. Rawn's involvement was alleged to be the executive who approved the contracts while knowing that the contractors were deliberately overcharging. Other reports indicate that Rawn may have been bribed to approve the contracts.

== Death and inquest ==
Rawn died from a gunshot on July 20, 1910, at his home in Winnetka, a suburb of Chicago. Reports at the time note that the injury may have been self-inflicted as legal proceedings had implicated Rawn as responsible for corrupt railway car repair contracts with the Illinois Central Railroad from which the railroad lost more than $1 million. He had been called to the witness stand several times in the weeks leading up to his death but had only answered a few questions and had been permitted to leave for various reasons several times.

Although his family members claimed that the wound was incurred in self-defense from a burglar, investigating police at the scene disputed this assertion. Pinkertons also investigated into Rawn's death and found evidence to support the family's claim of self-defense. Reports surfaced that a second bullet was found in the fireplace ashes near his body, and on July 22, coroner Peter Hoffman announced that he had received a letter identifying a black man by name as the burglar but Hoffman would not divulge the name that was in the letter except to police investigating the case. But a subsequent inquest into his death ruled after lengthy deliberation on July 29 in favor of the opinion that Rawn was killed by a shot from his own weapon that was fired by his own hand. The inquest did not, however, affirm whether it was a suicide attempt or an accident; the jurors worded the verdict in such a way as not to jeopardize the family's claims on Rawn's life insurance policies, which were valued in excess of $100,000.

A month after his death, there was an attempt to steal papers related to the scandal from the home of his daughter and son-in-law while they were out of town, but the theft was interrupted by a watchman.

Ira Rawn was buried in Rosehill Cemetery on July 22, 1910.

== Family details ==
Ira Rawn married Florence Willis on October 5, 1880, in Delaware, Ohio, and together they had three daughters: Sarah Elizabeth, Katherine (Coburn) and Florence. He was survived by his wife, Florence.

Business positions
Preceded by W. H. McDoel	President of Monon Railroad; 1909 – 1910	Succeeded by Fairfax Harrison
