= Richard Irvin (merchant) =

Scottish-American merchant

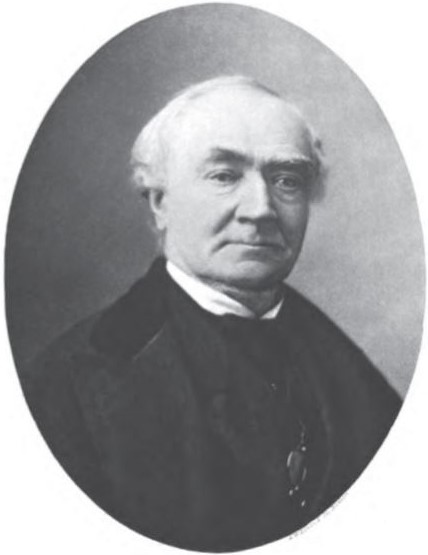

President of the Saint Andrew's Society of the State of New York
- In office 1862–1864
- Preceded by: Adam Norrie
- Succeeded by: Robert Gordon
- In office 1842–1851
- Preceded by: David S. Kennedy
- Succeeded by: Adam Norrie

Personal details
- Born: July 2, 1799 Glasgow, Scotland
- Died: June 27, 1888 (aged 88) Oyster Bay, New York, U.S.
- Spouse: Mary Williams Proudfit (m. 1832)
- Relations: James A. Burden Jr. (grandson); Arthur Scott Burden (grandson)
- Children: 9
- Parent(s): Janet Scott Irvin; William Irvin
- Education: University of Glasgow

Richard Irvin (July 2, 1799 – June 27, 1888) was a Scottish-American merchant and banker who served as the president of the Saint Andrew's Society of the State of New York.

== Early life ==
Irvin was born on July 2, 1799, in Glasgow, Scotland. He was the son of Janet (née Scott) Irvin and William Irvin. His maternal grandfather was the Reverend Richard Scott of Ewes, Scotland.

After an initial education by private tutors, he attended Glasgow Academy, before graduating from the University of Glasgow in 1823.

== Career ==
Irvin first visited the United States in 1823 to visit relatives. After briefly returning to Scotland, he emigrated to the U.S. in 1824 to join his uncle, Thomas Irvin, who ran an extensive shipping business in New York City from 198 Front Street, which he had founded in 1787. Following his uncle's death in 1836, Irvin took over the business, eventually bringing on board his two sons. Around 1840, the firm became the sole New York cosignees of the Gartsherrie Iron of William Baird & Co. of Glasgow, one of the most successful dealers of iron in the United Kingdom. They were also the New York agent of the Pioneer Line of Trans-Atlantic Steamships which included the SS Great Britain and SS Great Western.

In 1863, the firm, known as Richard Irvin & Co., relocated to 37 William Street and expanded from its commission business to banking. For fifty years, he served as a director of the Mechanics' National Bank and, at the time of his death, he was the oldest member of the New York Chamber of Commerce (having been a member since 1834).

Irvin joined the Saint Andrew's Society of the State of New York in 1825, serving as Manager from 1828 to 1833, second vice-president from 1835 to 1836, first vice-president from 1836 to 1837, and president from 1842 to 1845 and, again, from 1863 to 1864.

== Personal life ==
On May 23, 1832, Irvin was married to Mary Williams Proudfit (1809–1890) in Salem, New York. Mary was the daughter of Susan (née Williams) Proudfit and the Rev. Dr. Alexander Proudfit who served as pastor of the Associate Reformed Church in Salem for forty years. Her maternal grandfather was General John Williams, a Colonel during the American Revolutionary War and subsequently a member of Congress. Together, they were the parents of nine children, including:

- William Irvin (1833–1909), a Presbyterian minister.
- Alexander Proudfit Irvin (1835–1884), who married Susan Sherman Taylor, daughter of Robert Lenox Taylor, in 1863.
- Susan Williams Irvin (b. 1836).
- Mary Margaret Irvin (1837–1920), who married James Abercrombie Burden (1833–1906), son of Henry Burden, 1869.
- Richard Irvin Jr. (1840–1896), who married Mary Morris (1848–1918). Her sister was married to Henry Clews Jr. after her divorce from Frederick Gebhard.
- Susan Irvin (b. 1842).
- John Proudfit Irvin (1844–1845), who died in infancy.
- Samuel Irvin (1847–1884), a banker who died unmarried.
- John James Irvin (b. 1850).

Irvin died at his country home in Oyster Bay, New York, on June 27, 1888.

=== Descendants ===
Through his daughter Mary, he was a grandfather to James Abercrombie Burden Jr. (1871–1932), Richard Irvin Burden (1872–1900), William Proudfit Burden (1876–1943), Arthur Scott Burden (1879–1921), who married Florence Adele Sloane, a member of the Vanderbilt family.
