= Vaucluse (plantation) =

Plantation in Fairfax County, Virginia

Coordinates: 38°48′54″N 77°5′56″W

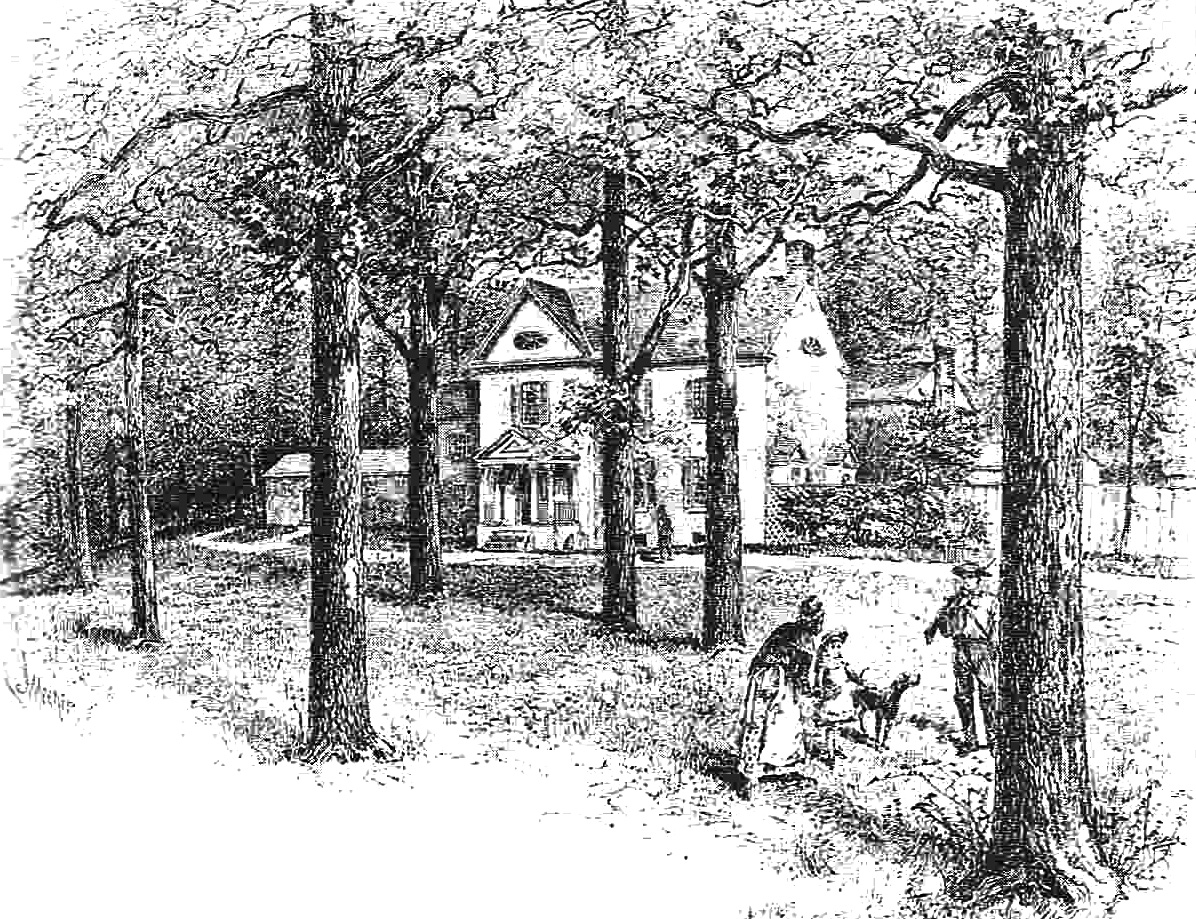
Vaucluse plantation in Virginia

Vaucluse was a villa in Fairfax County, Virginia. Located three miles (5 km) from Alexandria and 10 miles (16 km) from Washington, D.C., on a hill near the Virginia Theological Seminary. It was owned first by Dr. James Craik, and later by the Fairfax family, the first being Thomas Fairfax, 9th Lord Fairfax of Cameron.

== Dr. James Craik ==
Dr. Craik, surgeon in the Virginia Regiment, and the Continental Army, was persuaded by Washington after the Revolutionary War, to move his practice to Alexandria, Virginia. Dr. Craik settled at Vaucluse, where he died on February 6, 1814.

== Thomas Fairfax ==
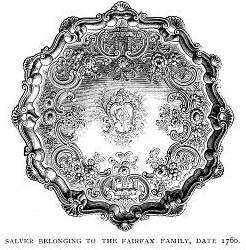
Fairfax family Silver

Thomas Fairfax was the son of Bryan Fairfax. He oversaw his land holdings of forty thousand acres, and established his family at Vaucluse, where he died, on April 21, 1846. His grandsons were born at Vaucluse: Charles S. Fairfax, was born on March 8, 1829, and John C. Fairfax was born on September 30, 1830. Thomas Fairfax left a life interest in Vaucluse to his widow, who lived there until her death in 1858, with her two widowed daughters, Mrs. Hyde, and Mrs. Cary.

Thomas Fairfax was a descendant of Thomas Fairfax, 6th Lord Fairfax of Cameron, who emigrated to America, and settled at the Belvoir plantation, and later Greenway Court, Virginia, where he actively managed his Northern Neck Proprietary, a land grant of more than a million acres (4,000 km^{2}) in the northern neck of Virginia, which he inherited from his mother, Catherine Colepeper.

== Constance Cary ==
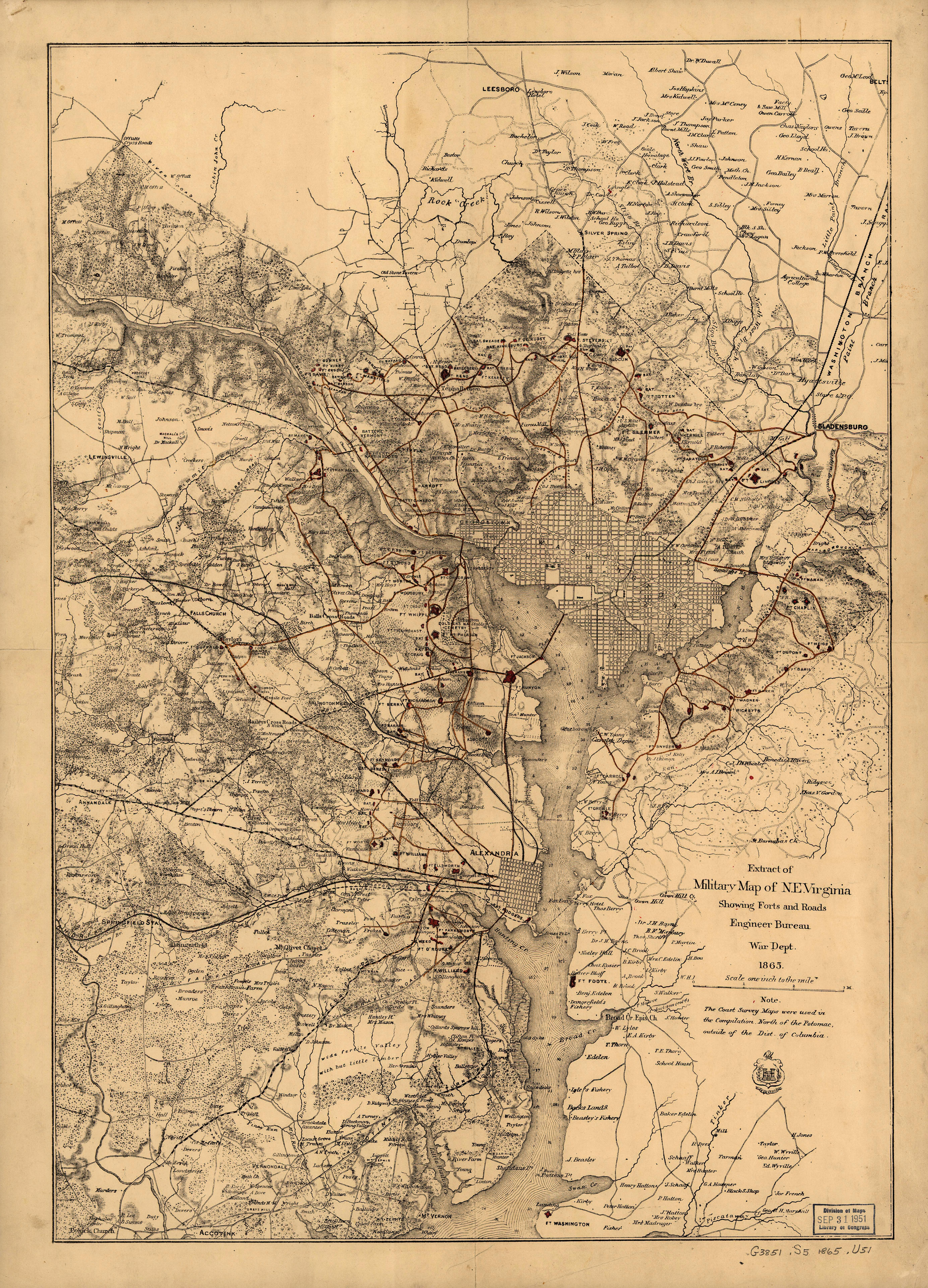
Fort Worth and Vaucluse map

At the outbreak of the American Civil War, Thomas Fairfax's granddaughter, Miss Constance Cary, was living at Vaucluse with her mother, Monimia Fairfax.

Momimia had married Archibald Cary (1815–1854), and they had three children: Falkland Cary, who died aged 16, Constance Cary, and Clarence Cary. The family moved to Richmond, Virginia, during the war, where Miss Cary wrote under the pen name Refugitta.

The mansion was destroyed during the American Civil War to make place for Fort Worth, in the defenses of the city of Washington. In December 1861, Captain J. Howard Kitching marched with four regiments to occupy the fort. The Fairfax family silver was buried there until recovered after the war.
