= Constance Cary Harrison =

American playwright and novelist (1843–1920)

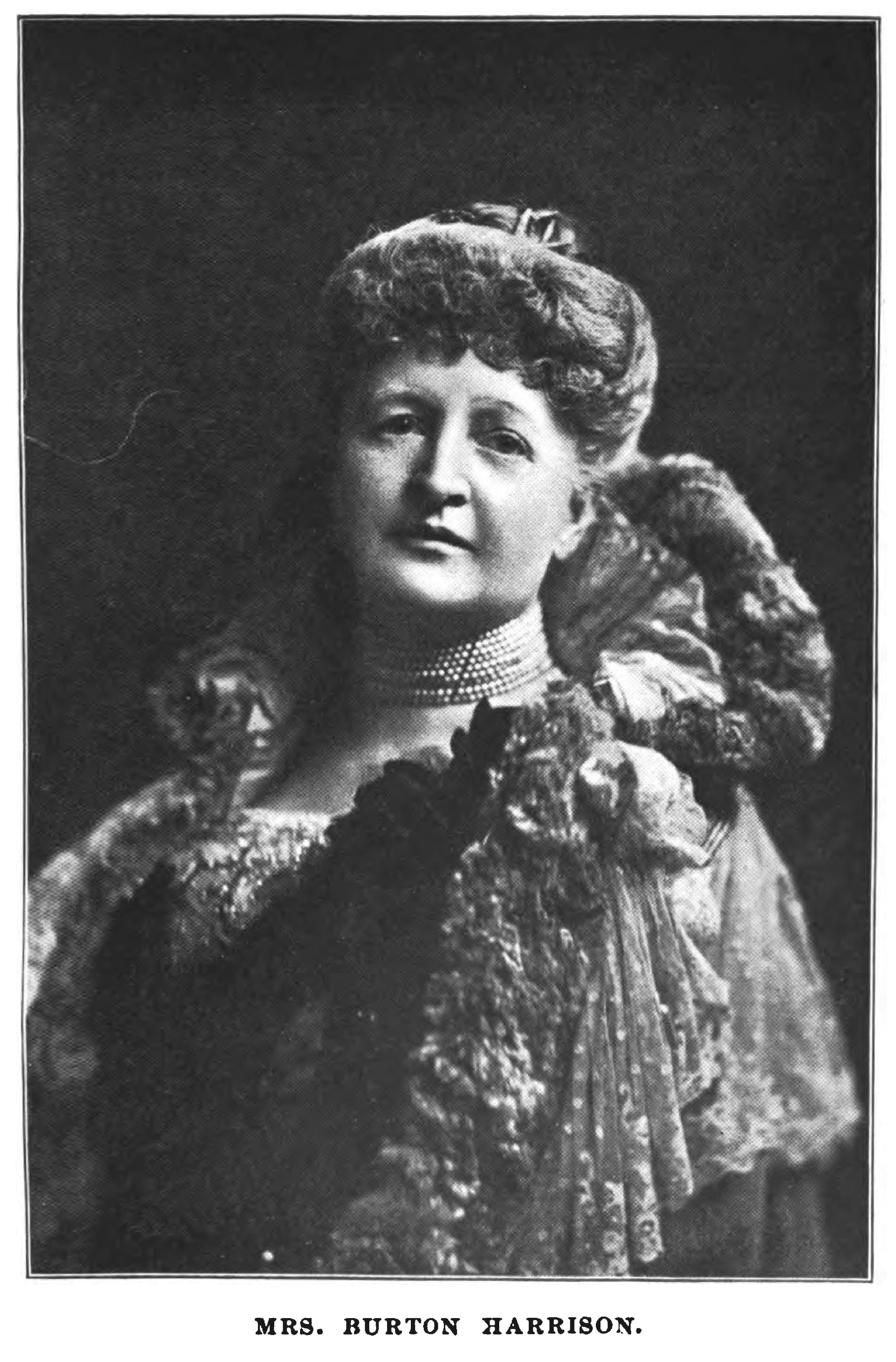
- Born: Constance Fairfax Cary; April 25, 1843; Lexington, Kentucky, U.S.
- Died: November 21, 1920 (aged 77); Washington, D.C., U.S.
- Resting place: Ivy Hill Cemetery, Alexandria, Virginia
- Occupation: Author
- Spouse: Burton Harrison (m. 1867; died 1904)
- Children: 3
- Writing career
- Pen name: Refugitta
- Language: English
- Genres: Plays, novels

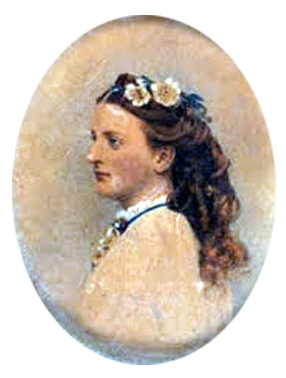
Portrait of Harrison

Constance Cary Harrison (pen name, Refugitta; April 25, 1843 – November 21, 1920), also referred to as Mrs. Burton Harrison, was an American playwright and novelist. She and two of her cousins were known as the "Cary Invincibles"; the three sewed the first examples of the Confederate Battle Flag.

Harrison belonged to an old Virginia noble family of the Fairfaxes and was related to the Jeffersons. Her home was destroyed during the American Civil War and consequently she witnessed much of the horrors of that struggle. After the war ended, she accompanied her mother on a trip to Europe. Upon her return to the United States, she married Burton Harrison, a lawyer and American democratic politician, who was at one time the Secretary of President Jefferson Davis. They moved to New York in 1876, and there she began her literary life. Her first magazine article was A Little Centennial Lady, which attracted much attention, and thereafter, she wrote a great deal.

Few literary women in New York were better known at the time, her home a social and literary center. She produced several plays, chiefly adaptations from the French. The work that probably gained her more reputation abroad was The Anglomaniacs, which appeared in The Century without her name. It ranked her at once among the best of the novelists. Some of her other works included, Golden Rod, The Story of Helen Troy, Woman's Handiwork in Modern Houses, Old-Fashioned Fairy Book, Bric-a-Brac Stories, Flower de Hundred, Miy Lord Fairfax of Greenway Court, The Homes and Haunts of Washington, The Russian Honeymoon, Sweet Bells Out of Tune, A Daughter of the South and Other Tales, Bar Harbor Days, and An edelweiss of the Sierras, Golden-rod, and other tales.

== Origins ==
Constance Fairfax Cary was born at Lexington, Kentucky (some sources cite Port Gibson, Mississippi) on April 25, 1843 into a planter aristocrat family, to parents Archibald and the Hon. Monimia (née Fairfax) Cary. Archibald Cary was the son of Wilson Jefferson Cary and Virginia Randolph.

Wilson Jefferson Cary was a descendant of the ancient and prominent English gentry family of Cary, lords of the manor of Clovelly in Devon and of Cockington and Tor Abbey, as is related in a genealogical work by Fairfax Harrison (1869–1938) of Belvoir House, Fauquier County, Virginia (son of Constance Cary Harrison) The Devon Carys, 2 vols., New York, 1920.

The Hon. Monimia Fairfax was the daughter of American peer, Thomas Fairfax, 9th Lord Fairfax of Cameron, and Lady Margaret Herbert, who was the granddaughter of John Carlyle and Sarah Fairfax. Her brother was Clarence Cary, who was prominent in New York society. Archibald Cary was a subscriber to the Monticello Graveyard (1837). They lived at Cumberland, Maryland, where he was editor of its leading newspaper, The Cumberland Civilian. When he died in 1854, her mother, Monimia, moved the family in with her grandmother at Vaucluse Plantation in Fairfax County, Virginia, until the outbreak of the Civil War.

== Civil War years ==
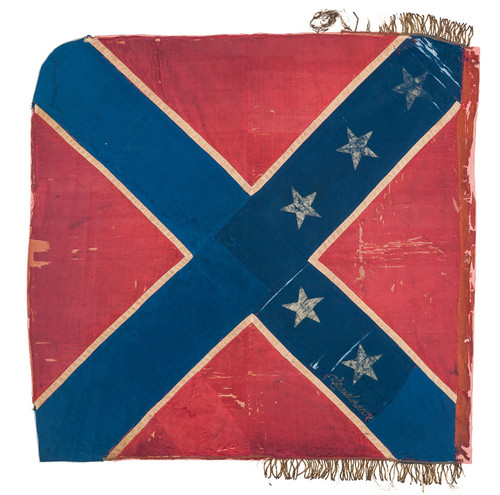
Confederate flag sewn by Constance Cary (reverse). Cary sewed her name on the blue stripe in the lower right of the flag.

After the seizure of Vaucluse and its demolition (to construct Fort Worth, as a part of the defenses of Washington, D.C.) she lived in Richmond, Virginia, during the American Civil War and moved in the same set as Varina Davis, Mary Boykin Chesnut, and Virginia Clay-Clopton. She was published in Southern magazines under the pen name "Refugitta".

Constance Cary lived with her Baltimore cousins, Hetty and Jennie; her mother served as the girls' chaperone. The three young ladies became known as the "Cary Invincibles". In September 1861, they sewed the first examples of the Confederate Battle Flag following a design created by William Porcher Miles and modified by General Joseph E. Johnston.

According to her own account, one flag was given to General Joseph E. Johnston, one to Confederate general P. G. T. Beauregard, and hers to Confederate general Earl Van Dorn. Later during the war, she assisted her mother as a nurse at Camp Winder.

She later met her future husband, Burton Harrison (1838–1904), a private secretary for Confederate President Jefferson Davis, and helped win his release from Fort Delaware after the war's end.

== After the war ==
Harrison and her mother spent the winter of 1865 in Paris before returning to New York City in 1866. She and Burton Harrison were married on November 26, 1867, at St. Anne's Church (Westchester County, New York). Their wedding breakfast was at Morrisania, the country home of her uncle, Gouverneur Morris Jr. Burton Harrison held various public offices while Constance spent her time writing and being involved in the city's social scene. They were the parents of three sons, including Fairfax Harrison (March 13, 1869 – February 2, 1938), a president of the Southern Railway Company, and Francis Burton Harrison (December 13, 1873 – November 22, 1957), who served as a Governor-General of the Philippines.

Among her other contributions to American literature, Harrison persuaded her friend Emma Lazarus to donate a poem to the fundraising effort to pay for a pedestal for the Statue of Liberty.

In 1871, the Harrisons first visited Bar Harbor, Mount Desert Island, Maine, staying at the cottage of Captain Royal George Higgins. Sometime in the 1880s, they commissioned Arthur Rotch of the architectural firm Rotch & Tilden to build a seaside cottage called "Sea Urchins", with a garden designed by Beatrix Farrand. The property now is owned by the College of the Atlantic, transformed into Deering Common, student center. "Sea Urchins" was the center of hospitality during the Gilded Age in Bar Harbor and she entertained many noted visitors there, including friend and neighbor James G. Blaine, who lived at "Stanwood". The Harrisons' winter home was a mansion on East 29th Street, New York.

Harrison died in Washington, D.C., in 1920, at the age of 77. She is buried in Ivy Hill Cemetery, Alexandria, Virginia.

== Works ==
The works of Constance Cary Harrison include:

=== Magazine articles and stories ===
- Harrison, Constance Cary (July 1876). "A Little Centennial Lady". Scribner's Monthly. 12 (3): 301–312.
- Harrison, Constance Cary (September 1879). "My Lord Fairfax of Virginia". Scribners Monthly. 18 (5): 715–728.
- Harrison, Constance Cary (July 1882). "An Edelweiss of the Sierras". Harper's New Monthly Magazine. 65 (385): 116–123.
- Harrison, Constance Cary (Feb 1883). "Old Valentines". The Century; A Popular Quarterly. 25 (4): 631–632.
- Harrison, Constance Cary (Mar 1883). "American Children at Home and in Society". The Century; A Popular Quarterly. 25 (5): 796.
- Harrison, Constance Cary (Mar 1885). "A House Built Upon Sand". Harper's New Monthly Magazine. 70 (418): 542–549. Archived from the original on December 13, 2000.
- Harrison, Constance Cary (Aug 1885). "A Virginia Girl in the First Year of the War". The Century; A Popular Quarterly. 30 (4): 606–615. Archived from the original on December 17, 2000.
- Harrison, Constance Cary (Apr 1889). "Washington at Mount Vernon after the Revolution". The Century; A Popular Quarterly. 37 (6): 834–850. Archived from the original on November 21, 2000.
- Harrison, Constance Cary (Apr 1889). "Washington in New York in 1789". The Century; A Popular Quarterly. 37 (6): 850–860. Archived from the original on December 19, 2000.
- Harrison, Constance Cary (June 1891). "Colonel William Byrd of Westover, Virginia". The Century; A Popular Quarterly. 42 (2): 163–179.
- Harrison, Constance Cary (Feb 1893). "Sweet Bells Out of Tune". The Century; A Popular Quarterly. 45 (4): 499–507.
- Harrison, Constance Cary (May 1895). "An Errant Wooing". The Century; A Popular Quarterly. 50 (1): 133–144.
- Harrison, Constance Cary (July 1895). "American Rural Festivals". The Century; A Popular Quarterly. 50 (3): 323–333.
- Harrison, Constance Cary (January 1896). "A Study in Husbands". The North American Review. 162 (470): 108–113.

=== Dramatic literature ===
- Two Strings to Her Bow (1884)
- The Mouse Trap (1886)
- Weeping Wives (1886)
- Behind a Curtain (1887)
- Tea at Four O'Clock (1887)

=== Other prose ===
- Golden-Rod. 1880.
- Woman's Handiwork in Modern Homes. 1881.
- Burton Harrison, Mrs (1881). The Story of Helen Troy. Harper. p. 220.
- Old-Fashioned Fairy Book. C. Scribner's sons. 1884. p. 380.
- Burton Harrison, Mrs (1885). Bric-a-Brac, Stories. C. Scribner's sons. p. 374.
- Scribe, Eugène; Burton Harrison, Mrs (1883). The Russian Honeymoon. The Dramatic Publishing Co. p. 80. Produced at Madison Square theater in 1888.
- Burton Harrison, Mrs (1890). The Anglomaniacs. New York: Century Company. pp. 216.
- Flower de Hundred. New York: Cassell. 1890. pp. 301.
- Burton Harrison, Mrs (1892). Belhaven Tales; Crow's Nest; Una; and King David. New York: Century Company. pp. 212.
- Burton Harrison, Mrs (1892). A Daughter of the South and Shorter Stories. New York: Cassell. pp. 281.
- Burton Harrison, Mrs (1892). Edelweis of the Sierras; Golden-Rod, and Other Tales. Harper. p. 230. ISBN 9780836931099.
- Burton Harrison, Mrs (1893). Sweet Bells out of Tune. New York: Century. pp. 231.
- Burton Harrison, Mrs (1894). A Bachelor Maid. New York: Century Company. p. 224.
- An Errant Wooing. New York: Century Company. 1895. pp. 258.
- Burton Harrison, Mrs (1895). A Virginia Cousin and Bar Harbor Tales. Boston and New York: Lamson Wolffe and Company. p. 202.
- The Merry Maid of Arcady. 1897.
- Burton Harrison, Mrs; Writers, Cairns Collection of American Women (1898). The Well-Bred Girl in Society. Curtis Pub. Co. p. 236.
- Good Americans. 1898.
- The Circle of a Century. 1899.
- A Princess of the Hills. Boston: Lothrop Publishing. 1901. p. 306.
- Burton Harrison, Mrs (1903). The Unwelcome Mrs. Hatch. D. Appleton & Co. p. 204. Noted actress Minnie Maddern Fiske appeared in the 1901 production of this play.
- Sylvia's Husband. New York: D. Appleton. 1904. pp. 221.
- The Carlyles: A Study of the Fall of the Confederacy. New York: D. Appleton. 1905. p. 283.
- Latter-Day Sweethearts. New York and London: The Authors and Newspapers Association. 1906. pp. 323.
- Burton Harrison, Mrs (1908). The Count and the Congressman. Cupples & Leon Company. p. 318.
- Recollections Gay and Grave. New York: Charles Scribner's Sons. 1911. p. 386.
