= Burton Harrison =

American politician (1838–1904)

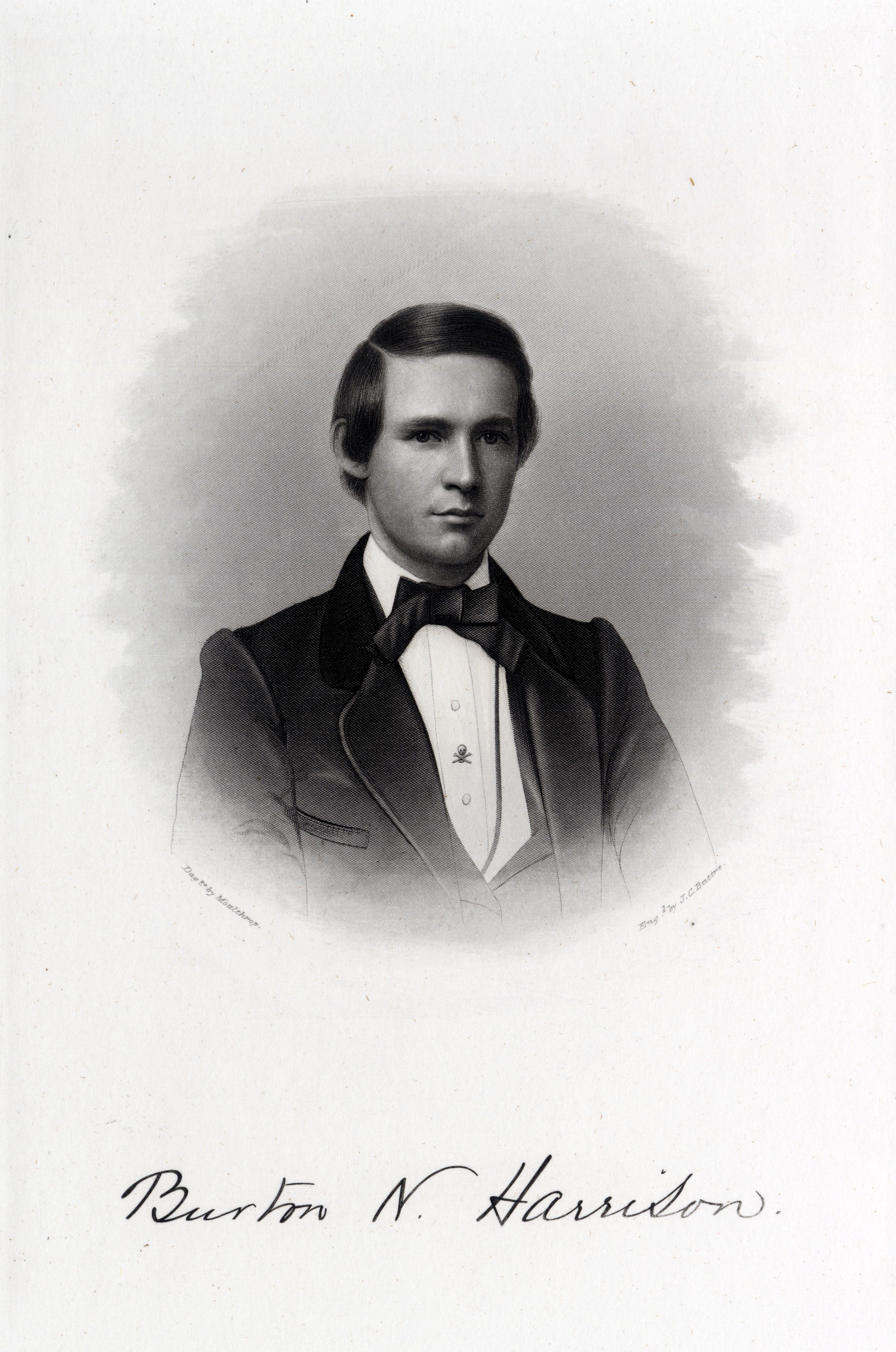
Burton N. Harrison, Yale College Class of 1859

Burton Norvell Harrison (July 14, 1838 – March 29, 1904), was a lawyer, American Democratic politician, and private secretary to Confederate States of America president Jefferson Davis. Harrison's support for the pro-slavery South countered against his father's support for anti-slavery.

== Early life ==
Harrison was born in New Orleans, Louisiana, to Jesse Burton Harrison (who died three years later) and Frances Anne Brand Harrison. He attended the University of Mississippi from 1854 to 1855. In 1859 he graduated from Yale University, where he was a member of Skull and Bones. Later that year he took a job at the University of Mississippi as an associate professor of mathematics and began to study law.

== The Civil War and its aftermath ==
In February 1862 Harrison became the private secretary to Confederate President Jefferson Davis. At the end of the American Civil War he was captured by the Union Army with Jefferson Davis and Varina Davis, and imprisoned at Fort Delaware, where he resumed his law studies.

In 1866 Harrison was released, settled in New York City, and was admitted to the bar. Feeling himself established, in November 1867 he married his sweetheart from his Richmond, Virginia, days, Constance Cary Harrison.

In 1872 he was an envoy to Santo Domingo, Dominican Republic, with Samuel P. Samuels and T. Scott Stewart, to negotiate annexation with Buenaventura Báez.

== Later life ==
In 1875, Harrison became the secretary and counsel of New York City's Rapid Transit Commission. The following year he actively campaigned for presidential candidate Samuel J. Tilden. In 1880, Harrison attended the Democratic convention in Cincinnati where he opposed William Jennings Bryan. After 1880 Harrison began to lose interest in politics. In 1893 he declined President Grover Cleveland's offers of appointments as Assistant Secretary of State and ambassador to Italy.

Burton and Constance Harrison were the parents of Fairfax Harrison (1869-1938) and Francis Burton Harrison (1873-1957).

Burton Harrison died in 1904 while visiting Washington, D.C.

== Works ==
- Harrison, Burton N. (November 1883). "The Capture of Jefferson Davis". The Century; A Popular Quarterly. 27 (1). The Century Company: 130–145. Archived from the original on November 20, 2000.

== Sources/External links ==
- The Burton Norvell Harrison Family Papers at the Library of Congress
- Recollections Grave and Gay. New York: Charles Scribner's Sons, 1911.
