= Fort Worth (Virginia) =

Civil-war era fort in Alexandria, Virginia

- Part of the Civil War defenses of Washington, D.C.
- Alexandria, Virginia

Site information
- Type: Earthwork fort
- Controlled by: Union Army
- Condition: Dismantled

Location
- Coordinates: 38.815°N 77.099°W

Site history
- Built: 1861
- Built by: U.S. Army Corps of Engineers
- In use: 1861–1865
- Materials: Earth, timber
- Demolished: 1865
- Battles/wars: American Civil War

Fort Worth was a timber and earthwork fortification constructed west of Alexandria, Virginia as part of the defenses of Washington, D.C. during the American Civil War.

Built in the weeks following the Union defeat at Bull Run, Fort Worth was situated on a hill north of Hunting Creek, and Cameron Run, (which feeds into it). From its position on one of the highest points west of Alexandria, the fort overlooked the Orange and Alexandria Railroad, the Little River Turnpike, and the southern approaches to the city of Alexandria, the largest settlement in Union-occupied Northern Virginia. In modern times, the site of Fort Worth sits within the boundaries the City of Alexandria (the land west of Quaker Lane, was annexed from Fairfax County in the 1950s) just off Seminary Road. Fort Worth Ave, a residential street approximates Fort Worth's Civil War location.

It was named for William Jenkins Worth.

== Occupation of Alexandria ==
The occupation of Northern Virginia was peaceful, with the sole exception of the town of Alexandria. There, as Colonel Elmer E. Ellsworth, commander of the New York Fire Zouaves (11th New York Volunteer Infantry Regiment), entered a local hotel to remove the Confederate flag flying above it, he was shot and killed by James Jackson, the proprietor. Ellsworth was one of the first men killed in the American Civil War. Throughout the remainder of the war, Alexandria would lean strongly towards the Confederate government, necessitating continued occupation by a Union garrison.

=== Washington D.C. Fortifications ===
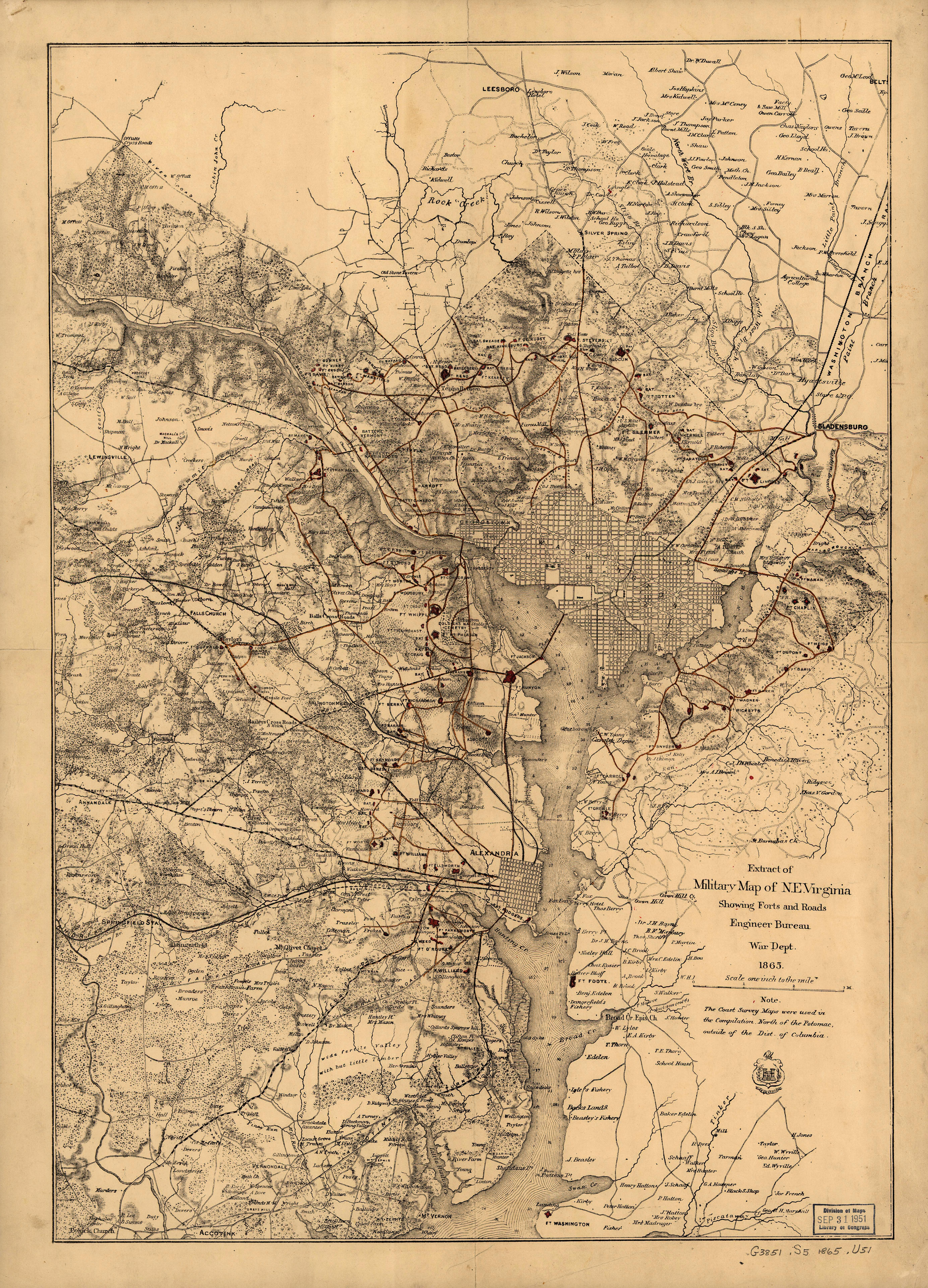
Washington D.C. Fortifications map

Over the seven weeks that followed the occupation of northern Virginia, forts were constructed along the banks of the Potomac River and at the approaches to each of the three major bridges (Chain Bridge, Long Bridge, and Aqueduct Bridge) connecting Virginia to Washington and Georgetown.

While the Potomac River forts were being built, planning and surveying was ordered for an enormous new ring of forts to protect the city. Unlike the fortifications under construction, the new forts would defend the city in all directions, not just the most direct route through Arlington. In mid-July, this work was interrupted by the First Battle of Bull Run. As the Army of Northeastern Virginia marched south to Manassas, the soldiers previously assigned to construction duties marched instead to battle. In the days that followed the Union defeat at Bull Run, panicked efforts were made to defend Washington from what was perceived as an imminent Confederate attack. The makeshift trenches and earthworks that resulted were largely confined to Arlington and the direct approaches to Washington.

On July 26, 1861, five days after the battle, Maj. Gen. George B. McClellan was named commander of the military district of Washington and the subsequently renamed Army of the Potomac. Upon arriving in Washington, McClellan was appalled by the condition of the city's defenses.

In no quarter were the dispositions for defense such as to offer a vigorous resistance to a respectable body of the enemy, either in the position and numbers of the troops or the number and character of the defensive works... not a single defensive work had been commenced on the Maryland side. There was nothing to prevent the enemy shelling the city from heights within easy range, which could be occupied by a hostile column almost without resistance.

To remedy the situation, one of McClellan's first orders upon taking command was to greatly expand the defenses of Washington. At all points of the compass, forts and entrenchments would be constructed in sufficient strength to defeat any attack. Alexandria, which contained the southern terminus of the Chesapeake and Ohio Canal and one of the largest ports in the Chesapeake Bay, was an object of "anxious study."

== Planning and construction ==
In August 1861, Gen. McClellan assigned Gen. John G. Barnard to take charge of construction to begin creation of a complete system of defenses.

Gen. Horatio Wright, who had overseen the construction of Fort Ellsworth, and Gen. John Newton, who was in charge of the forts south of Four Mile Run, supervised the construction and managed the flow of men and materials. The fort was constructed upon Vaucluse, a plantation that was seized from the Fairfax family.

Construction began on September 1, 1861. The perimeter was 463 yards, with places for 25 guns, including one 100-pound Parrott rifle.

== Wartime use ==
On Wednesday, November 27, 1861, Col. J. Howard Kitching marched with the 6th New York Artillery to occupy the Fort, and complete construction.

My dearest L : I received your lovely letter, and would have answered it immediately, but that I was taken sick the day after I got it, and have been sick ever since. We received orders late Wednesday night to move our two companies which had been guarding Fort Ellsworth to Fort Worth, the next morning, Thanksgiving Day. So we were obliged to give up our comfortable quarters, and take up our line of march for an unfinished earthwork, on the outskirts of our line of fortifications; where instead of spending our time drilling on the guns, and teaching our men something useful, we are forced to take up our axes and shovels, and go to work upon the Fort. In Ellsworth we had very nice quarters within the works, and everything convenient, and were able to crib a little time every day to ourselves. Here we are encamped on a side hill, outside the work, the mud about eight inches deep, very little to eat, and plenty of work. If you could just look in upon us now, and see how I live, you would scarcely believe your eyes. Major Doull has not, as yet, received his tents, and he and I have to occupy the same tent, which of course is pitched right in the mud, such things as boards for flooring being quite unheard of, and it is so full of trunks, cooking utensils, our beds, etc., besides our saddles, which we have to keep there, having no stable, that it is almost impossible to move around. We almost froze the first night, and as I was sick in bed, and felt the cold very much, we foraged around and found a little cast-iron stove, which we rigged up in the tent, and except that we were smoked out like two woodchucks nine or ten times in twenty-four hours, we were more comfortable. Then our "Bill of Fare," my I told the boys this morning when we succeeded in getting our morning meal (a piece of government beef and a tin cup of coffee) at one o'clock, after running around in the cold and snow for three or four hours, that I thought I would give about one month's pay to have one good meal at home. You must not think that we complain, however.

They moved on to Fort Blenker, on Friday January 17, 1862.

Fort Blenker, January 19, 1862. .... On Friday morning, while we were all hard at work in Fort Worth, Major Doull received orders to march, immediately to this post with two companies. In less than two hours' time, we had torn down our nice winter quarters, which we had built with so much trouble; left our nice log cook-houses and stables, and were on the march; I, in command of the troops, Doull having gone ahead to arrange for our relieving the troops at Blenker.
