= Fairfax Harrison =

American railroad president and writer (1869–1938)

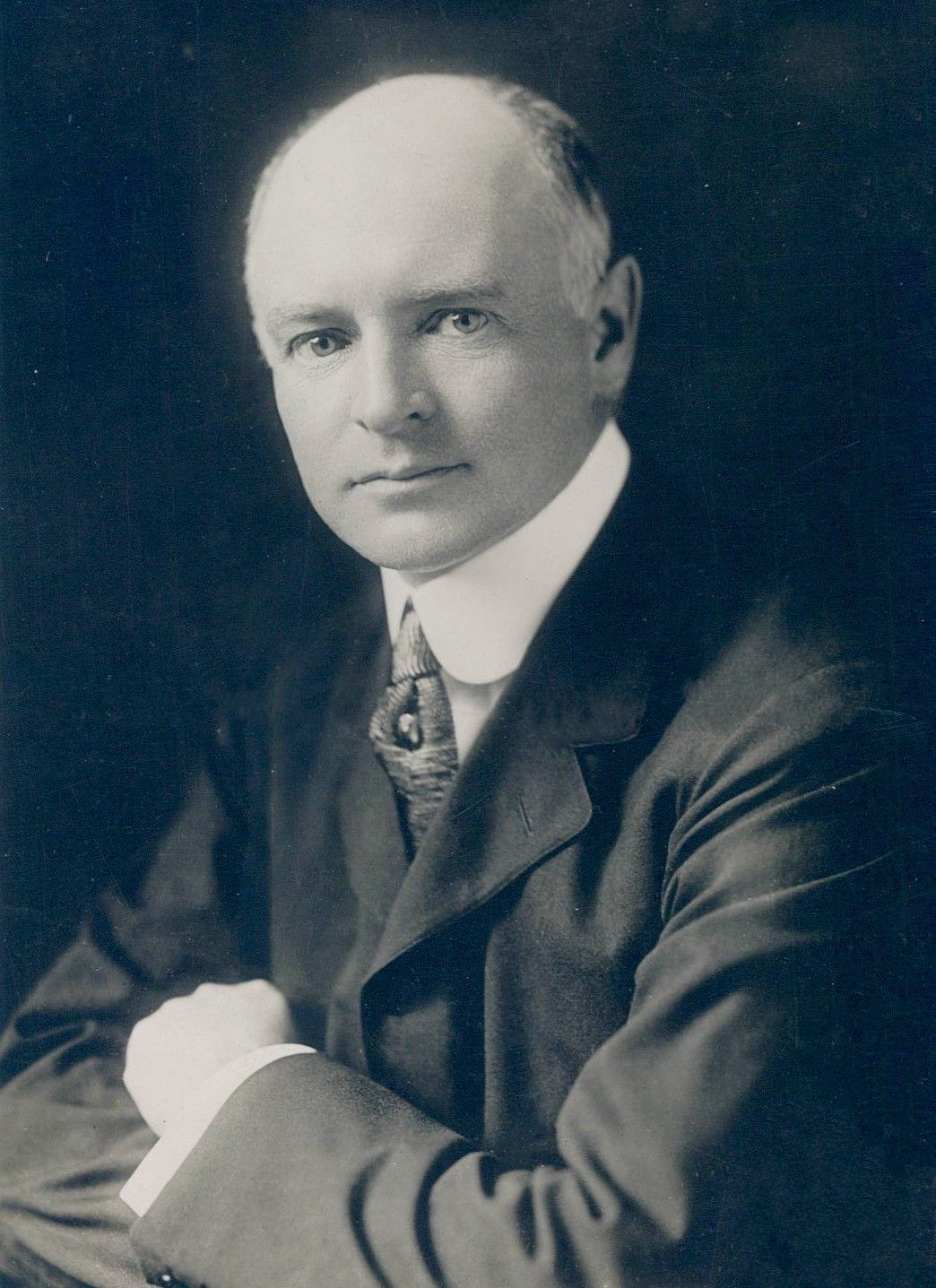
- Fairfax Harrison, taken before 1913
- Born: Reginald Fairfax Harrison; March 13, 1869; New York City, U.S.
- Died: February 2, 1938 (aged 68); Baltimore, Maryland, U.S.
- Education: Yale University (BA); Columbia University (MA)
- Occupation: Railroad president
- Spouse: Hetty Cary (m. 1894)
- Children: 4
- Parents: Burton Harrison (father); Constance Cary Harrison (mother)
- Relatives: Francis Burton Harrison (brother)
- Writing career
- Pen name: A Virginia Farmer
- Genre: History
- Subjects: Thoroughbreds, Virginia local history, genealogy
- Notable works: Proprietors of the Northern Neck; Landmarks of Old Prince William; Background of the American Stud Book; Early American Turf Stock

Reginald Fairfax Harrison (March 13, 1869 – February 2, 1938) was an American lawyer, businessman, and author. A son of the secretary to Confederate President Jefferson Davis, Harrison studied law at Yale University and Columbia University before becoming a lawyer for the Southern Railway Company in 1896. By 1906, he was Southern's vice-president of finance, and in 1907, he helped secure funding to keep the company solvent. In 1913, he was elected president of Southern, where he instituted a number of reforms in the way the company operated.

By 1916, under Harrison's leadership, the Southern had expanded to an 8,000-mile (13,000 km) network across 13 states, its greatest extent until the 1950s. In December 1917, months after the United States entered World War I in April, the federal government took control of the railroads, running them through the United States Railroad Administration, on which Harrison served. An economic boom after the war helped the company to expand its operations; Harrison worked to improve the railroad's public relations and to upgrade the locomotive stock by introducing more powerful engines. Another of his concerns was to increase the amount of the railroad's track and to expand the area it served. Harrison struggled to keep the railroad industry afloat during the Great Depression, but by 1936, Southern was once again profitable. Harrison retired in 1937, intending to focus on his hobby of writing about historical subjects, including the roots of the American Thoroughbred horse, but he died three months later in February 1938.

== Background and early life ==
Reginald Fairfax Harrison was born in New York City on March 13, 1869, to Burton Harrison and his wife Constance Cary. Burton had served as private secretary to Jefferson Davis, the president of the Confederate States of America during the American Civil War, and Constance Cary was a novelist. Harrison's brother, Francis Burton Harrison, was Governor-General of the Philippines from 1913 to 1921. Another brother, Archibald, and all three attended Yale University. Fairfax Harrison graduated from Yale in 1890; he was a member of the Skull and Bones secret society. He went on to attend Columbia University, earning a Master's in Arts.

== Railroad career ==
=== Early career ===
Harrison was admitted to the New York State bar in 1892 and worked for the law firm Bangs, Stetson, Tracy & MacVeagh from 1892 to 1896. He joined the Southern Railway Company in May 1896 as a lawyer, becoming an assistant to the company's president in 1903. He served as vice-president in charge of finance and accounting from 1906. During the Panic of 1907, Harrison successfully persuaded J. P. Morgan to purchase bonds in the Southern to keep the company solvent. After the panic had subsided, Harrison was named president of the Chicago, Indianapolis and Louisville Railway, later the Monon Railroad (succeeded Ira G. Rawn after Rawn's death), which was jointly owned by Southern and the Louisville & Nashville Railroad. William Finley, president of the Southern Railway, died on November 23, 1913, and Harrison was elected as his successor eight days later. Besides the chairmanship of the Southern Railway, he was also elected to succeed Finley on three subsidiary railroads. (Note: These three railroads were the Mobile and Ohio Railroad, the Alabama Great Southern Railway, and the Virginia Southwestern Railway.) His election was considered to be a sign of change in the Southern United States, especially in its railroads, both because he was connected to Southerners and for his activism on behalf of the south.

=== First years as president ===
One of Harrison's first acts as president was to implement a new training program for college graduates hired by the company. Rather than being placed in supervisory roles, they were given regular entry-level jobs in the engine shops and on the building and repairing of railroad track, to give them an understanding of the basics of the railroad business. He also instituted a remedial education program for the regular workforce; they were trained in mathematics and other subjects to high school level, as well as in engine and machine-shop basics. The program was designed to help train new supervisors in the skills needed to oversee other workers.

Another of Harrison's goals was to raise the morale of the workforce and locomotive engineers; crews were assigned to the same locomotives, and senior engineers were allowed to paint their names on their engines. When business declined in 1914, Harrison reduced his salary by 20 percent, but introduced smaller and graduated cuts for other staff, with the smallest percentages at the lowest pay scales. Other efforts to improve morale included rewards for fuel efficiency and the improvement of safety, including stricter investigation of accidents.

Harrison oversaw changes in the railway's board of directors. Until 1915, most of the members of the board were from the northern United States, but after 1915, a majority of the board members were southerners. In 1914, there were two unusual appointments to the board: Edwin Alderman and John Kilgo. Alderman was the president of the University of Virginia and Kilgo was a bishop in the Methodist Episcopal Church.

Harrison established a foreign trade department for the railroad, hoping to take advantage of the railway's ability to connect to the Mississippi Valley and Atlantic and Gulf of Mexico ports. In 1915, when the railway lost 12 percent of its revenue owing to disruptions in trade caused by the start of World War I, Harrison was concerned about longer-term changes underway. In the annual report that year, he warned stockholders that automobile ownership could severely impact railroad passenger revenues. His words proved prophetic, as automobiles eventually led to the disappearance of most passenger train traffic.

=== World War I ===
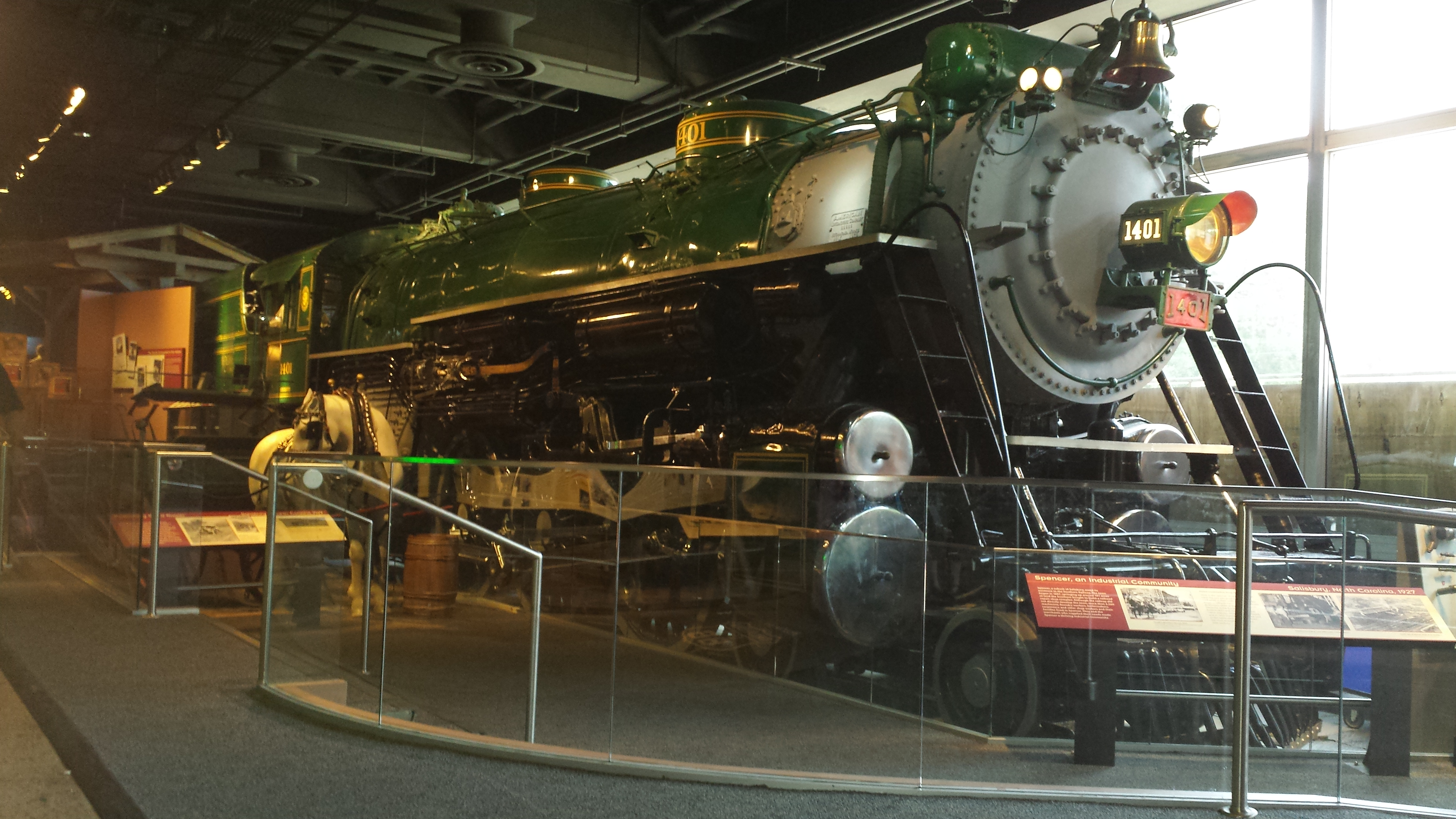
A Southern Railway Ps-4 heavy Pacific locomotive painted in the distinctive green and gold colors that Harrison introduced

From 1913 to 1919, Harrison oversaw the extension of double-track on the railway's mainline between Washington, D.C. and Atlanta, Georgia. The project was hampered by the war effort, but eventually covered the complete 638-mile (1,027 km) distance between the two cities. In 1916, Harrison acquired a railroad line that ran from Meridian, Mississippi to New Orleans, Louisiana. This brought Southern Railway's track total to more than 8,000 miles (13,000 km), covering 13 states. After the United States entered World War I in April 1917, some military training camps were located in the south, and much of the construction material used to build them was hauled over the Southern Railway. Harrison was elected chairman of the Railroads' War Board, a coordinating committee of railroad presidents. Its five members were tasked with eliminating bottlenecks and fostering cooperation between the various railroads.

The board's efforts failed to meet the government's expectations; in December 1917, Woodrow Wilson, the President of the United States, ordered the federal government to take control of the railroads by establishing the United States Railroad Administration (USRA). Harrison worked for the USRA during World War I and, under its regulations, was required to step down as chairman of the Southern Railway. By the time the USRA returned control of Southern in March 1920, its treasury was bare. A few years of operation returned a surplus to the company, which led to the stockholders requesting in 1923 that the railroad pay a dividend to the holders of the common stock, something Southern had never done. Harrison managed to block the request, but in March 1924, a subsequent demand was successful, and a dividend of $5 (equivalent to $94 in 2025) per share was declared. That was increased to $7 (equivalent to $127 in 2025) per share in 1926 and $8 in 1928 (equivalent to $150 in 2025).

=== 1920s ===
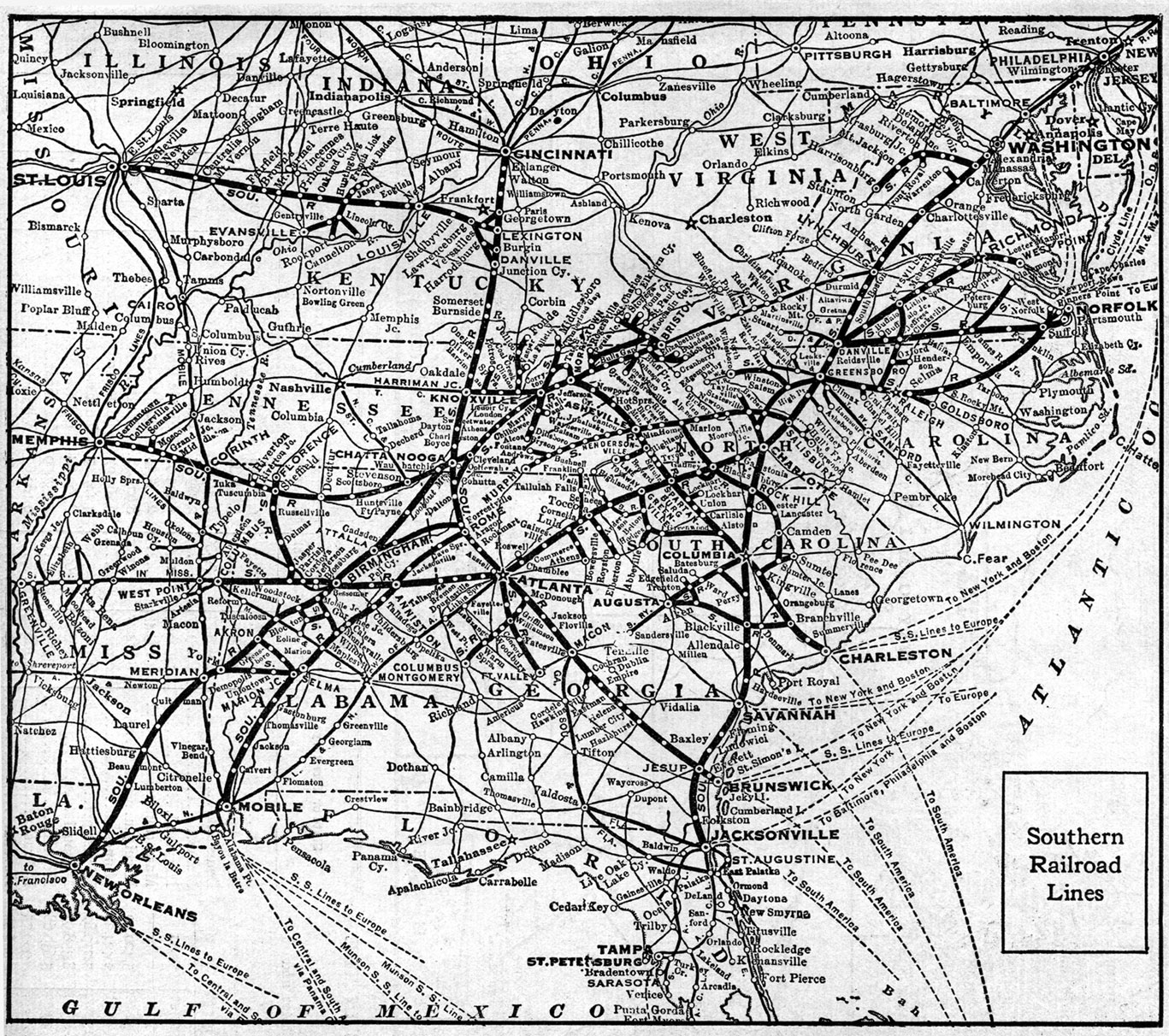
Map of the Southern Railway's routes in 1921, shown as bold lines

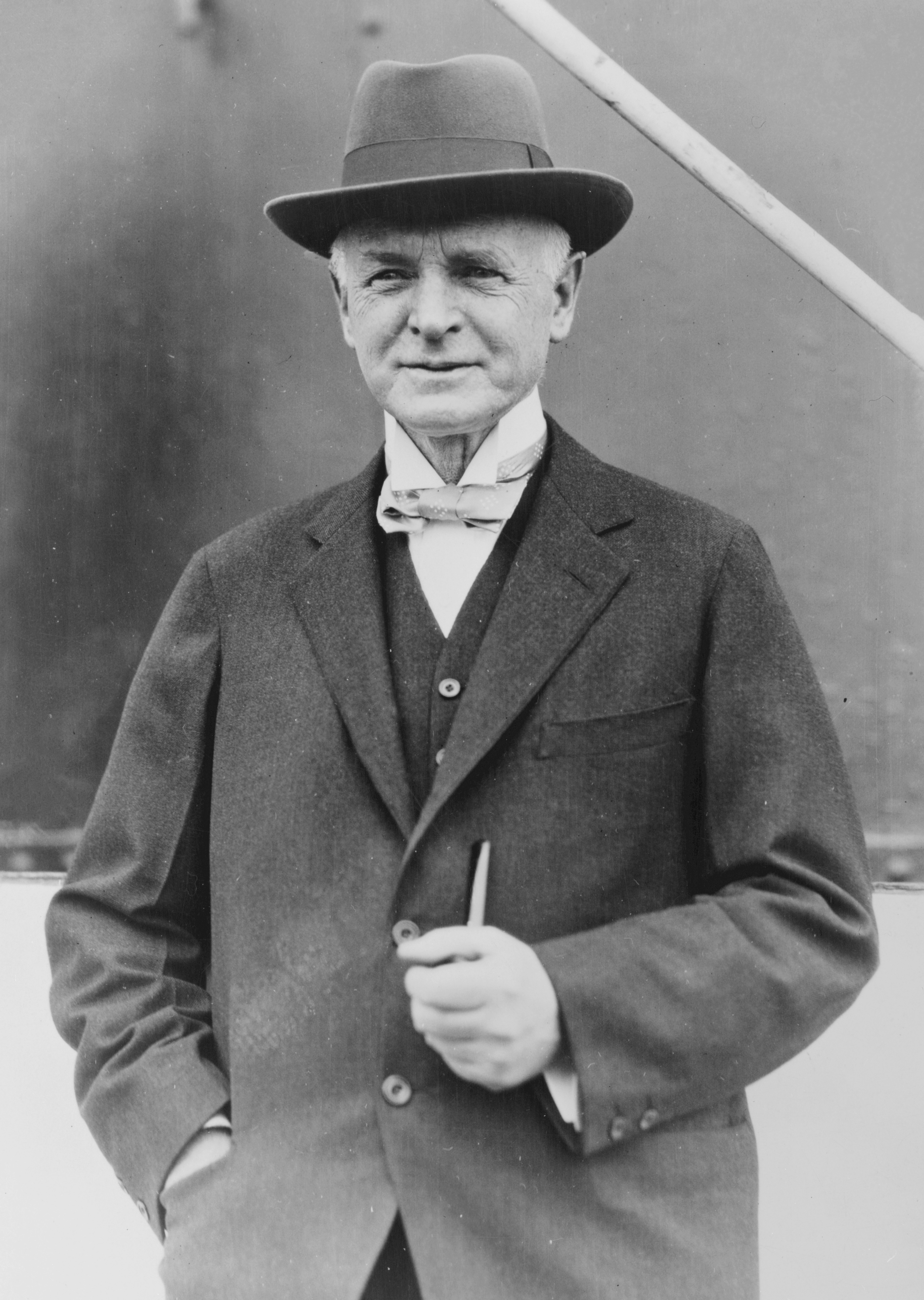
Harrison in 1927

An economic boom in the South following the end of World War I greatly increased Southern's revenues. Harrison spent a good deal of time traveling around the Southern United States, endeavoring to increase Southern industry. When he traveled, he used two private railroad cars, named the Carolina and the Virginia. Other railroad presidents used only one, which made Harrison's practice unique. The Carolina was a sleeping car, and the Virginia was set up to serve members of the board of directors, with a kitchen, dining room, and observation area.

Harrison attempted to increase the power of Southern's locomotives. In 1923, engineers under his direction created the plans for the Ps-4 class of Pacific type locomotives, which became famous and a symbol of the Southern Railway. On a visit to England, Harrison had seen the paint scheme used by the London and North Eastern Railway, which used apple green-painted engines. Returning home in 1925, he ordered the newly delivered Pacifics painted a forest green, which he called Virginia, with gold lettering and silver trim. These engines pulled the newly refurbished passenger trains that Harrison had begun work on before the war. He also instituted new passenger lines. In 1921 the Suwannee River Special began to run between Chicago, Detroit, and Cleveland down to Tampa and St. Petersburg in Florida. The Crescent Limited began service in 1925 between New Orleans and New York, with a scheduled time for the one-way trip of 37 hours and 50 minutes.

Harrison continued the public relations and advertising efforts of his predecessors; in 1924, an advertising campaign was launched with the slogan "The Southern Serves the South", which soon became well known. Harrison also spent long hours in negotiations to secure the legal foundations of the railway, consolidating the railroad's debt and acquiring majority control of some of the smaller lines that made up the railway.

In 1926, the United States government forced the railroad to move out of its headquarters on Pennsylvania Avenue in Washington, D.C. Although Harrison threatened to take the company headquarters to Atlanta, in the end, a new headquarters building was built on McPherson Square. Harrison installed a private lobby entrance leading to a private elevator to the 10th and 11th floors. The railroad took occupancy of the building in the middle of 1929.

During these years, Harrison exhibited a number of personality quirks that became legendary. One was his habit of inviting subordinates to dine with him in the executive dining room by sending them a blue chip bearing the meal's conversational topic. Usually, the topics were intellectual rather than related to the running of the railroad. Another oddity was his refusal to use his railroad pass, which entitled him to free travel. Instead, he personally paid for his commute between his home and the railroad's offices.

=== Great Depression ===
Before the Wall Street Crash of 1929, Southern's stock sold for around $146 (equivalent to $2,740 in 2025), with an all-time high of just over $151 (equivalent to $2,830 in 2025). In 1932, the stock hit a low of $2.50 (equivalent to $59 in 2025). In 1929, Southern's freight traffic had been 8.4 billion ton-miles; it fell to 4.4 billion ton-miles in 1932. Southern's debt rose, and the company almost entered bankruptcy in 1932. Harrison ordered the payment of dividends to be halted in 1932, and many employees took pay cuts. Further efforts included a thorough check of expenses, with every item subjected to scrutiny to see what could be eliminated. By 1936, the railroad again showed a profit; this marked the turning point for the company in dealing with the Great Depression.

Harrison chose not to be reappointed as president in 1937. He nominated Ernest Norris as his successor. Harrison, who was 68 at the time, planned to concentrate on his hobby of writing historical works, but he died three months after his retirement.

== Writing career ==
Harrison was an author as well as an industrialist, writing on Virginia history and genealogy. Among his works were a translation of the agricultural works of ancient Roman writer Marcus Porcius Cato and several books on the local history of Virginia, including The Landmarks of Old Prince William, Devon Carys, Proprietors of the Northern Neck and Virginia Carys. He also wrote on the early history of the American Thoroughbred racehorse; his work includes The Belair Stud, The Roanoke Stud, The Background of the American Stud Book, The Equine F.F.V's, The John's Island Stud, and Early American Turf Stock. The last came out in two volumes, the first on mares in 1934, and the second on stallions in 1935. Peter Willet, a later writer on Thoroughbreds, described him as an "indefatigable researcher in American pedigrees". Harrison also served on the Executive Committee of the Virginia Historical Society and was instrumental in the preparation of the 120-volume Virginia Historical Index.

== Family, death, and legacy ==
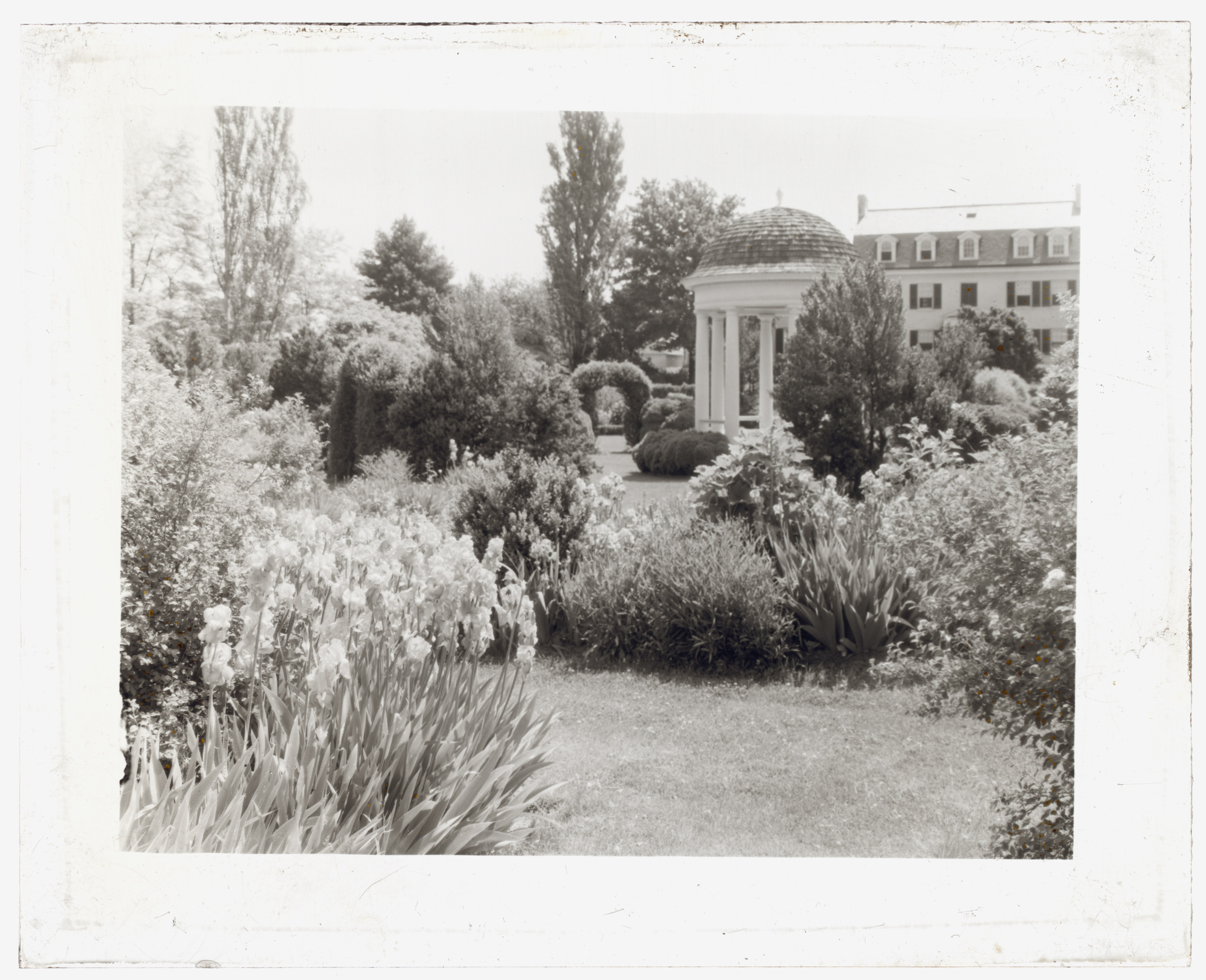
1928 photograph of Belvoir House, home of Fairfax Harrison

Harrison married Hetty Cary in 1894. They had four children: three daughters, Ursula, Constance, and Sally, and a son, Richard. He was a member of the Episcopal Church. Harrison was described as "physically imposing" and gray-haired in his middle age. Harry DeButts, an employee and protégé, described him as "a little cold when you first met him, but underneath he was a very warm, admirable, capable and wise man". He died on February 2, 1938, of heart disease, and was buried in Ivy Hill Cemetery in Alexandria, Virginia. On the day after Harrison's death, The New York Times carried his obituary, but instead of a photograph of Harrison, the picture that ran with the obituary was of John J. Pelley, the president of the Association of American Railroads, who was still alive.

The College of William and Mary in Virginia holds some of his papers. A selection of his letters was published in 1944 under the title A Selection of the Letters of Fairfax Harrison. The University of Virginia library has on loan another collection of Harrison's papers. Correspondence and business files from his time as president of the Southern Railway are held by the Southern Railway Historical Society in their collection of presidents' files. They were loaned to the Southern Museum of Civil War and Locomotive History in 2003 and were still there in 2008.

== See also ==
- Southern Railway 1401 – single surviving locomotive from the Ps-4 class of Southern locomotives

== Citations ==
Business positions
Preceded by Ira G. Rawn	President of Monon Railroad; 1910–1913	Succeeded by Frederic Adrian Delano
Preceded by William W. Finley	President of Southern Railway; 1913–1937	Succeeded by Earnest E. Norris
