= Edwin F. Russell =

American newspaper publisher

- Born: July 14, 1914; Elizabeth, New Jersey, U.S.
- Died: December 22, 2001 (aged 87); Hobe Sound, Florida, U.S.
- Education: Royal Naval College, Greenwich
- Alma mater: Princeton University
- Spouses: Lady Sarah Spencer-Churchill (m. 1943; div. 1966) Iris Smith Van Ingen Paine (m. 1966; div. 1968) Cynthia Cary Van Pelt (m. 1976)
- Children: 4
- Parent(s): Lucius Thomas Russell; Marian Cronin

Edwin Fairman Russell (July 15, 1914 – December 22, 2001) was an American newspaper publisher who had joined the Royal Navy to fight Germany before the United States entered World War II.

== Early life ==
Russell was born on July 15, 1914, in Elizabeth, New Jersey, one of five children born to Lucius Thomas Russell (1871–1948) and Marian Cronin. His father, who was born in Mississippi, was a newspaper publisher who founded The Newark Star, which became The Star-Ledger.

Russell was a 1937 graduate of Princeton University.

== Career ==
As the United States had yet to enter World War II, Russell enlisted in the Royal Navy Volunteer Reserve. In the autumn of 1941, he was summoned for active duty in the British Royal Navy and, after a brief tour of duty in Canadian waters, attended the Royal Naval College, Greenwich, and served aboard the British cruiser Norfolk as gunnery officer. He met his first wife, Lady Mary, in Scotland while recovering from an injury he received on the job.

In 1943, he transferred to the United States Navy upon the U.S.'s entry into the War, and eventually joined the staff of Gen. Dwight D. Eisenhower.

=== Publishing career ===
During the 1940s, he worked as the associate publisher of The Star-Ledger, a Newark newspaper.

Russell was the chairman of The Patriot-News Company and the former publisher of The Harrisburg Patriot-News in Harrisburg, Pa. After graduating from Princeton University, he worked during the 1940s as the associate publisher of The (Newark, NJ) Star-Ledger.

In 1947, Russell paid $2,500,000 to purchase the Harrisburg Patriot and Evening News from the widow of Vance C. McCormick, the former Chairman of the Democratic National Committee who owned the papers and had died in 1946.

Russell served in 1952 as chairman of the Pennsylvania Citizens For Eisenhower Committee. He held several positions with Condé Nast Publications; at one time he was publisher of Vogue magazine.

== Personal life ==
On May 15, 1943, he married Lady Sarah Consuelo Spencer-Churchill (1921–2000), daughter of John Spencer-Churchill, 10th Duke of Marlborough (1897–1972). Winston Spencer Churchill, a grandson of the prime minister, served as a page at the wedding. Lady Sarah's grandmother was Consuelo Vanderbilt (1877–1964), who married Jacques Balsan (1868–1956) after her divorce from the Duke of Marlborough. Before the marriage ended in divorce in 1966, they had four daughters:

- Serena Mary Churchill Russell (b. 1944), who was briefly engaged to Michael Santangelo, a Broadway producer, in 1964. She married Neil Balfour (b. 1944), in 1978, who had previously been married to Princess Elizabeth of Yugoslavia, the only daughter of Prince Paul of Yugoslavia.
- Consuelo Sarah Churchill Russell (1946-2020), who married James Lee Toback in 1968. They divorced in 1969 and she married Mark Schulman. They divorced and she married E. William Judson, with whom she had children.
- Alexandra Brenda Russell (1949-2018), who married Timothy Campbell Birch in 1970.
- Jacqueline Dorothy Russell (b. 1958), who married Eugene Flewellyn Williams III in 1981.

Following his divorce, he married Iris Vanderbilt (née Smith) Van Ingen Paine (1927–2006) in 1966. Iris was the daughter of Earl Edward Tailer Smith, the former United States Ambassador to Cuba and Consuelo Vanderbilt Earl (1903–2011), and was previously married to Herbert Pratt Van Ingen and Augustus G. Paine IV. Her maternal grandparents were Virginia Graham Fair and William Kissam Vanderbilt II, the brother of Russell's first wife's grandmother. They later divorced and she married Donald C. Christ.

His third and final marriage was in 1976 to Cynthia Cary Van Pelt (b. 1924), the daughter of Guy Fairfax Cary and Cynthia Roche. She was a first cousin once removed of Princess Diana, who survived him. From his third marriage, he had three stepchildren: Peter, Abby and Guy Van Pelt.

Russell died at his home on Hobe Sound, Florida, on December 22, 2001. His ashes were scattered by his wife, children, and grandchildren on Omaha Beach, in Normandy, France.

=== Descendants ===
Through his eldest daughter, he was the grandfather of Consuelo Lily Balfour (b. 1979) and Alastair Albert David Balfour (b. 1981). Through his daughter Consuelo "Mimi" he was the grandfather of Alexander Russell Judson, Nicholas Judson and Ian Judson Through his youngest daughter, Jacqueline Russell Williams he was the grandfather to three more grandsons, Eugene F. Williams (b. 1985), Henry "Harry" Russell Williams (b. 1988) and Philip Dixon Williams (b. 1989)
