= Goodyear family =

Family

Goodyear
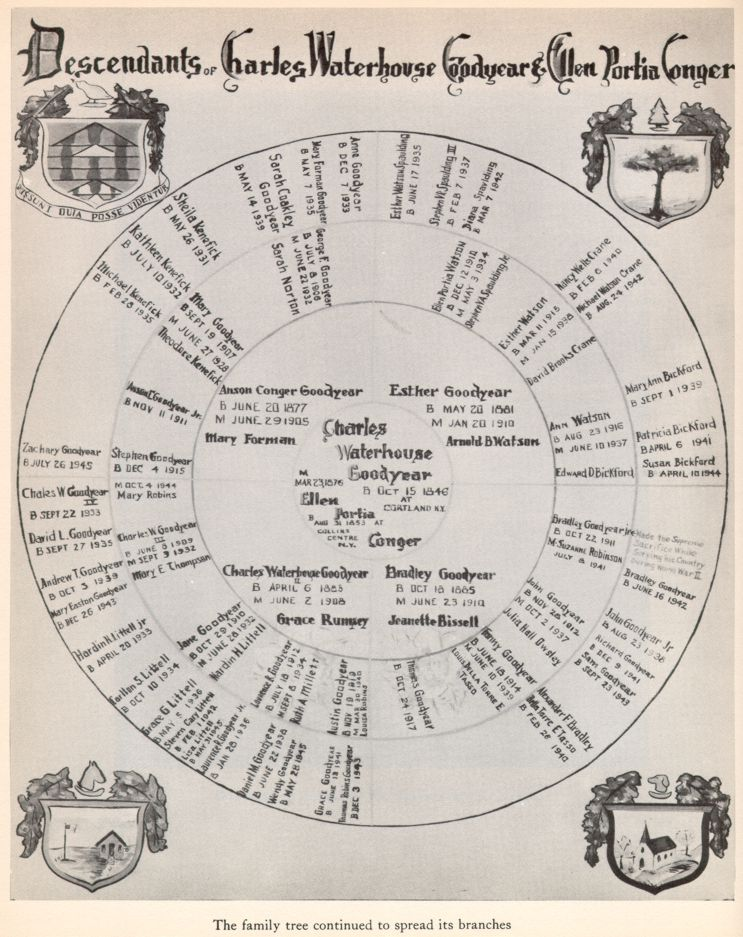
- Current region: New York
- Origin: England
- Members: Frank H. Goodyear; Charles W. Goodyear; Anson Goodyear
- Connected families: Romanov family Knox family Roosevelt family Thurn und Taxis family
- Estates: Goodyear House, A. Conger Goodyear House, Goodyear Cottage

The Goodyear family is a prominent family from New York, whose members founded, owned and ran several businesses, including the Buffalo and Susquehanna Railroad, Great Southern Lumber Company, Goodyear Lumber Co., Buffalo & Susquehanna Coal and Coke Co., and the New Orleans Great Northern Railroad Company. Stephen Goodyear was a founder of the New Haven Colony, and served as Deputy governor from 1643 to 1658. Stephen's descendant, Charles Goodyear, invented vulcanized rubber; the Goodyear Tire and Rubber Company is named after him. The family was also involved in the arts. Anson Goodyear was an organizer of the Museum of Modern Art in New York City; he served as its first president and a member of the board of trustees. William Henry Goodyear was the first curator of the Metropolitan Museum of Art.

== Prominent members ==
=== Charles W. Goodyear ===
(October 15, 1846 – April 16, 1911) was an American lawyer, businessman, lumberman, and member of the prominent Goodyear family of New York. Based in Buffalo, New York, along with his brother, Frank, Charles was the founder and president of several companies, including the Buffalo and Susquehanna Railroad, Great Southern Lumber Company, Goodyear Lumber Co., Buffalo & Susquehanna Coal and Coke Co., and the New Orleans Great Northern Railroad Company.

In the late 19th century, his brother and he were highly successful in harvesting timber from formerly isolated areas of Pennsylvania and New York. They built railroad spurs to provide access to the properties and local sawmills, using the railroads to transport lumber to market. In the early 20th century, they used this same strategy in the South. They bought several hundred thousand acres of virgin pine forest in Louisiana and Mississippi, built the largest sawmill in the world, and developed the company town of Bogalusa, Louisiana, for the workers to support their operation. They also built a railroad to serve the operation and connect it to markets. Goodyear was also a director of Marine National Bank, and of General Railway Signal.

=== Frank H. Goodyear ===
Frank, the younger brother of Charles W. Goodyear, married Josephine Looney, and together they had four children:

1. Grace Goodyear, who married Ganson Depew in 1894. Depew was the nephew of Chauncey Depew, President of New York Central and United States Senator from New York from 1900–1911. Ganson was admitted to the bar in 1887, but stopped practicing law to work for his father-in-law and became Manager of Goodyear Lumber Co., vice-president of Buffalo and Susquehanna Coal, and assistant to the President of the Buffalo and Susquehanna Railroad.
2. Josephine Goodyear, who married George Montgomery Sicard in 1900. Sicard came from Utica, New York; his paternal uncle, George J. Sicard, was a partner of the law firm Cleveland, Bissell & Sicard, and later of Goodyear's firm Bissell, Sicard & Goodyear. George Sicard attended Yale University, entering with the class of 1894, and leaving at the end of his freshman year to attend the University of the State of New York, where he received his LL.B. in 1895. He moved to Buffalo where he began practice with the firm Moot, Sprague & Brownell. After his marriage to Josephine, he went to work for the Goodyear companies. Josephine died in 1904. Soon afterward Sicard, who purportedly did not get along well with his father-in-law Frank Goodyear, resigned from the Goodyear companies and moved to Pelham Manor for the last 30 years of his life.
3. Florence Goodyear, who married George Olds Wagner in 1902 in Buffalo. Florence attended the now defunct Saint Margaret's School, Buffalo, and finishing school in New York City. Wagner was a graduate of Cornell University.
4. Frank Henry Goodyear Jr. attended the Pawling School and Yale. He married Dorothy Virginia Knox. Dorothy was the daughter of Seymour and Grace Knox. Knox was known for forming the F. W. Woolworth Company with his cousin Frank Winfield Woolworth, and held prominent positions in the Marine Trust Co. The Knoxes resided in Buffalo and East Aurora, New York. Frank Henry Goodyear Jr. had business interests in lumber and railroads, as well as the Goodyear-Wende Oil Company. He was vice-president of the Great Southern Lumber Company; Vice-president of the New Orleans Great Northern Railway; and, a director of the Gulf Mobile & Northern Railroad; Marine Trust; and, of the Bogalusa Paper Company. He initially lived between the two homes he inherited from his mother: 762 Delaware Avenue in Buffalo and the Goodyear Cottage on Jekyll Island. After marrying, he built the Knox Farm House at East Aurora that he sold to his brother-in-law before building Crag Burn, a larger house nearby on 222 acres (89.8 ha). He owned several yachts, all named Poule d'Eau, the last of which was 122 ft (37.2 m) with 300-horsepower diesel engines but exploded off Jekyll Island in 1929, killing the engineer; it happened just hours after Frank and his guests had reached land. Frank was a keen sportsman (notably polo, squash and bridge). He was a member of the Buffalo Country Club, Buffalo Athletic Club, Niagara Falls Country Club, East Aurora Country Club, Jekyll Island Club, Racquet and Tennis Club of New York, and the Yale Club. After Frank Jr. died in 1930, his widow Dorothy Knox Goodyear later married Edmund Pendleton Rogers (1882–1966) in 1931.

- Son Frank Henry Goodyear, III, was known as Frank Goodyear, Sr. He graduated from Yale University in 1941, and served at the Brooklyn Navy Yard during World War II. He founded the Environmental Research Institute, an environmental organization involved in research on the grizzly bear population in Yellowstone Park.
- Daughter Dorothy Knox Goodyear attended the Foxcroft School and made her debut on Long Island and in Buffalo in 1935. She married Clinton Randolph Wyckoff Jr., of Buffalo, in 1937.
- Daughter Marjorie Goodyear married a Mr. Wilson. She died sometime before September 2015.
- Son Robert Millard Goodyear was born in Buffalo, New York. He graduated from the Groton School and served as a navigator with the Eighth Air Force in the World War II. After the war he attended Yale University, graduating in 1949. Robert was a member of the Skull and Bones secret society and a pitcher/right fielder on the Yale baseball team, playing for Yale in the College World Series in 1947 and 1948. Also on the baseball team was his good friend, George H. W. Bush, the 41st President of the United States of America. Robert moved to Aiken, South Carolina, in 1951. There he purchased Longleaf Plantation with his brother, Frank, and developed a successful Aberdeen Angus cattle breeding operation. Robert was an avid golfer and a long-time member of the Augusta National. In addition to golf, he was a skilled court tennis player and served as president of the Aiken Tennis Club. He lived in Aiken until his death.

== See also ==
- Charles W. Goodyear
- Great Southern Lumber Company
- Buffalo and Susquehanna Railroad
- Anson Goodyear
- Charles W. Goodyear House
- Chip Goodyear
- Bogalusa, Louisiana
