= James Roche, 3rd Baron Fermoy =

Irish peer and British politician (1852–1920)

The Right Honourable The Lord Fermoy

Member of Parliament for Kerry East
- In office 1896–1900
- Preceded by: Michael Davitt
- Succeeded by: John Murphy

Personal details
- Born: James Boothby Burke Roche; 28 July 1851 Twyford Abbey, Middlesex
- Died: 30 October 1920 (aged 69) Artillery Mansions, Westminster, London
- Party: Irish National Federation
- Spouse: Frances Ellen Work (m. 1880; div. 1891)
- Children: Eileen Roche; Cynthia Roche; Maurice Roche, 4th Baron Fermoy; Francis Roche
- Parent(s): Edmond Roche, 1st Baron Fermoy; Eliza Caroline Boothby

James Boothby Burke Roche, 3rd Baron Fermoy (28 July 1851 – 30 October 1920), was a Member of Parliament in the British House of Commons, and he held a title in the Peerage of Ireland during the final two months of his life.

== Early life and career ==
He was born in 1851 at Twyford Abbey, Middlesex, the son of Edmond Roche, 1st Baron Fermoy, and his wife Eliza Caroline née Boothby. He was educated at Trinity College, Cambridge.

In 1896, he stood as an Anti-Parnellite Irish National Federation candidate in the Kerry East by-election for a seat in the Parliament of the United Kingdom. The Nationalists had split into two factions after the party leader, Charles Stewart Parnell, was named as co-respondent in a divorce. Roche was supported initially by both the Parnellite Irish National League and the Anti-Parnellite Irish National Federation, until it was revealed that he was himself divorced. During the campaign, Roche denied publicly that he knew of the divorce or that he had deserted his wife and children. Although he went on to win the seat, the opposing Unionist candidate gained the highest vote ever recorded for a Unionist candidate in Kerry East. He served one term and did not stand in the following general election in 1900.

== Personal life ==
He visited the United States, where he met the heiress Frances Ellen Work (1857–1947). Shortly thereafter, on 22 September 1880, they married at Christ Church, New York City. The marriage was not a success, and they separated in December 1886. She was granted a divorce on the grounds of desertion on 3 March 1891 at Wilmington, Delaware.

Together, they had four children (two daughters, then twin sons):

- Eileen Roche (1882−1882), who died in infancy.
- The Hon. Cynthia Roche (1884−1966), who married firstly Arthur Scott Burden (1879–1921) in 1906. After his death, she married Guy Fairfax Cary (1879–1950) in 1922.
- Maurice Roche, 4th Baron Fermoy (1885–1955), who was the maternal grandfather of Diana, Princess of Wales.
- The Hon. Francis George Burke Roche (1885–1958), who died unmarried.

In 1899, he sued his ex-wife with a Writ of Habeas Corpus to produce their daughter in court, stating that she was depriving "the child of her liberty." The case was settled out of court shortly thereafter.

On 1 September 1920, he succeeded his elder brother as Baron Fermoy. Just two months later, he died at Artillery Mansions, Westminster, London, aged 69. He was buried at St. Marylebone Cemetery in East Finchley on 3 November 1920.

=== Descendants ===
Through his son Maurice, he was the great-grandfather of Diana, Princess of Wales. His daughter Cynthia was the matrilineal great-grandmother of American actor Oliver Platt.

Parliament of the United Kingdom
Preceded by Michael Davitt	Member of Parliament for Kerry East; 1896–1900	Succeeded by John Murphy
Peerage of Ireland
Preceded by Edward Roche	Baron Fermoy; September–October 1920	Succeeded by Maurice Roche
