= Frances Ellen Work =

American socialite

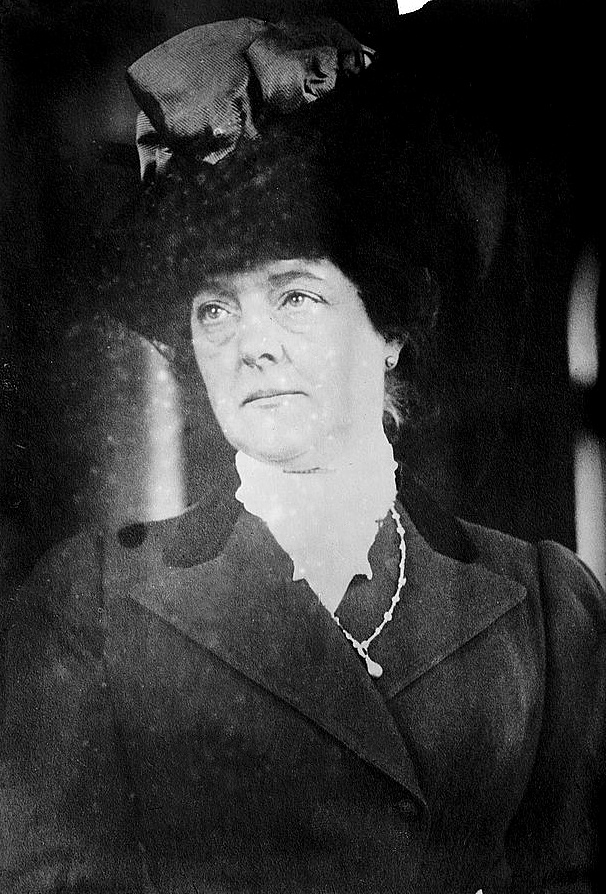
- Born: October 27 or 28, 1857; New York City, U.S.
- Died: January 26, 1947 (aged 89); New York City, U.S.
- Spouses: James Roche (m. 1880; div. 1891); Aurél Bátonyi (m. 1905; div. 1909)
- Children: Eileen Roche; Cynthia Roche; Maurice Roche, 4th Baron Fermoy; Francis Roche

Frances Ellen Work (October 27 or 28, 1857 – January 26, 1947) was an American heiress and socialite.

== Early life ==
Frances was born in New York City on October 27 or 28, 1857. She was a daughter of Franklin H. Work, a well-known stockbroker and protégé of Cornelius Vanderbilt, and his wife, Ellen Wood. Her sister Lucy Bond Work was married to Peter Cooper Hewitt. She also had a brother, the horseman and road driver George Paul Work, who died from consumption in Davos, Switzerland.

== Society life ==
In 1892, Frances was included in Ward McAllister's "Four Hundred", purported to be an index of New York's best families, published in The New York Times. Conveniently, 400 was the number of people that could fit into Caroline Astor's ballroom.

Work was a prominent figure in the New York City and Newport, Rhode Island, social sets, and was friends with Mrs. Reginald Vanderbilt. When her father died in 1911, he left an estate, for the benefit of her, her children, and her sister, of $15 million ($417 million in 2025). Her father's will limited her yearly allowance to $80,000 ($2.22 million in 2025). In his will, Mr. Work stipulated that no part of his estate was to go to his "erstwhile son-in-law, James Boothby Burke Roche."

== Marriages ==
=== James Roche ===
On September 22, 1880, at Christ Church, New York City, Work married the Hon. James Boothby Burke Roche, who would later become the 3rd Baron Fermoy in 1920 after his elder brother, Edward Roche, 2nd Baron Fermoy, died without any male heirs. He was the son of Edmond Roche, 1st Baron Fermoy, and his wife, Elizabeth Caroline Boothby.

They had four children (two daughters, then twin sons):

- Eileen Roche, who died in infancy.
- The Hon. Cynthia Roche, who married, firstly, Arthur Scott Burden in 1906 and, secondly, Guy Fairfax Cary in 1922. She is the matrilineal great-grandmother of American actor Oliver Platt.
- The Hon. Edmund Maurice Burke Roche, who later became the 4th Baron Fermoy, and was the maternal grandfather of Diana, Princess of Wales.
- The Hon. Francis George Burke Roche, a banker who died unmarried in 1958.

In 1890, Work divorced Roche, claiming desertion, before he had succeeded to the barony. The divorce was awarded on March 3, 1891. Her lawyer was Thomas F. Bayard, former United States Secretary of State. In 1899, her ex-husband, then a UK Member of Parliament, sued Work with a writ of habeas corpus to produce their daughter, Cynthia, in court. Roche claimed Work was depriving "the child of her liberty." The case was settled out of court shortly thereafter. Until 1920, sons Maurice and Francis used the surname Work.

=== Aurél Bátonyi ===
On August 4, 1905, Work married Aurél de Bátonyi, a Hungarian-born riding master who claimed on his 1895 naturalization application to be an Austro-Hungarian count. The couple met in 1903, and they were quite happy together. Work encouraged Bátonyi to propose marriage, however Bátonyi was reluctant. Once they wed, Work did not inform her father, who was supporting her financially, until sometime in early-1906. Work's father did not trust Bátonyi, and he encouraged newspapers and society tabloids to publish suggestions that Bátonyi's real name was Arthur Cohn, and suggestions that Bátonyi's claim of nobiliary rank was fraudulent. However, the marriage remained successful.

Work sued Bátonyi for divorce in October 1907, allegedly due her father's threat to disinherit her if she continued in marriage with her "new husband". However, Bátonyi's extended travels as a riding master led to rumors of infidelity among high society, as well as claims Bátonyi was still married to a woman in Hungary. Divorce proceedings continued for two years. On November 5, 1909, divorce was granted in Work's favor. However, Bátonyi was awarded a financial settlement which included several properties. Following the divorce, Bátonyi lost favor among high society in New York, and moved into a villa in Middletown, Rhode Island he originally shared with Work. Bátonyi then transferred the titles of his other properties into his mother's name, Johanna (Janka) Kohn.

In 1919, the Alien Property Custodian seized all of Bátonyi's properties following alleged claims he returned to Austria to fight for the Central Powers. Bátonyi was a naturalized U.S. Citizen. The properties were most likely seized due to abandonment and unpaid property tax as neither Bátonyi or his mother had been seen since late 1914. Their homes and surrounding lands had fallen into disrepair, except those rented as working farms.

There is no record of the Bátonyi returning to the U.S. after 1919, and neither Bátonyi or his mother, or their representatives appeared in court to challenge the seizures. The properties eventually reverted to the Industrial Trust Company who was appointed trustee by the APC, and were later sold. A registration dated October 30, 1914, was filed at the U.S. consular office in The Hague informing the embassy Bátonyi was employed by a division of the Red Cross. The registration expired on November 14, 1915, without any amendments.

Work's financial support of Bátonyi ceased in 1914 due to no contact.

== Death ==
Work died at her residence at 1020 Fifth Avenue in Manhattan, New York, at the age of 89 on January 26, 1947. Her great-great-grandchildren include the British princes William and Harry, and the American actor Oliver Platt.
