= One Calvert Plaza =

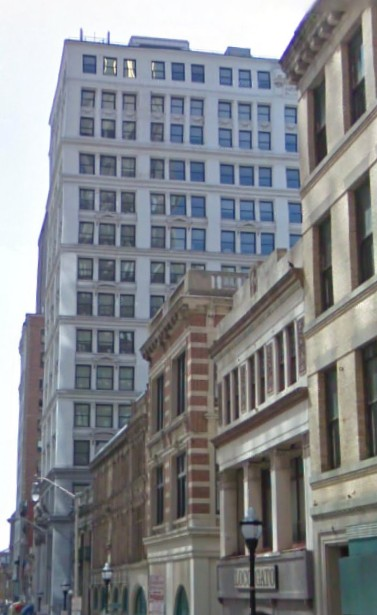
- One Calvert Plaza viewed from The Bank of America Building
- Interactive map of the One Calvert Plaza area
- Former names: Continental Trust Building; The Continental Building; Mercantile Trust Building

General information
- Type: Commercial offices
- Architectural style: Beaux-Arts
- Location: 201 East Baltimore Street (southeast corner with South Calvert Street); Baltimore, Maryland
- Coordinates: 39.2897°N 76.6122°W

Height
- Antenna spire: 76 m (249 ft)
- Roof: 67 m (220 ft)

Technical details
- Floor count: 16

Design and construction
- Architects: D.H. Burnham & Company (Chicago); Thompson-Starret Company
- Continental Trust Company Building
- U.S. National Register of Historic Places
- Location: 1 South Calvert Street; Baltimore, Maryland
- Area: less than one acre
- Built: 1900
- Architect: Burnham, D. H. & Co.; Thompson-Starret Company
- Architectural style: Skyscraper
- NRHP reference No.: 83002930
- Added to NRHP: February 3, 1983

One Calvert Plaza, formerly the Continental Trust Company Building, is a historic 16-story, 76 m (249 ft) skyscraper in Baltimore, Maryland. The Beaux-Arts, early modern office building was constructed with steel structural members clad with terra cotta fireproofing and tile-arch floors. Its namesake was chartered in 1898 and instrumental in merging several Baltimore light and gas companies into one citywide system (known as the "Consolidated Gas, Light, Electric Power Company of Baltimore City" until 1955 when it was shortened and renamed the "Baltimore Gas and Electric Company"). It was constructed in 1900–1901 to designs prepared by D.H. Burnham and Company of Chicago and is a survivor of the Great Baltimore Fire of February 1904, that destroyed more than 100 acres (40 ha) in the present downtown financial district. When it was built in 1901, it was then the tallest building in Baltimore, and it kept that title until being surpassed by the iconic Bromo-Seltzer Tower of the Emerson Drug Company on the northeast corner of West Lombard and South Eutaw Streets on the downtown west side. Led by Capt. Isaac Edward Emerson, (1859–1931), the inventor of the stomach remedy and antacid, "Bromo-Seltzer" in 1911.

Continental Trust Company Building was listed on the National Register of Historic Places in 1983. It is within the Baltimore National Heritage Area.
