= George Washington Vanderbilt III =

American yachtsman and scientific explorer (1914–1961)

- Born: September 23, 1914; Newport, Rhode Island, US
- Died: June 24, 1961 (aged 46); Mark Hopkins Hotel; San Francisco, California, US
- Education: St. Paul's School; Adirondack-Florida School
- Spouses: Louise Parsons (m. 1935; div. 1946) Anita Zabala Howard (m. 1946; div. 1958) Joyce Branning (m. 1958–1961) Louise Mitchell Paine (m. 1961–1961)
- Children: 1
- Parent(s): Alfred Gwynne Vanderbilt; Margaret Emerson
- Awards: Legion of Merit

George Washington Vanderbilt III (September 23, 1914 – June 24, 1961) was an American yachtsman and scientific explorer who was a member of the prominent Vanderbilt family.

== Early life ==
Born in Newport, Rhode Island, he was the younger son of Alfred Gwynne Vanderbilt and Margaret Emerson Vanderbilt. He was the brother of Alfred Gwynne Vanderbilt Jr. and a half-brother to William Henry Vanderbilt III from his father's first marriage to Ellen "Elsie" French. In 1915, when George was less than a year old, his father perished in the sinking of the RMS Lusitania.

His mother, Margaret, remarried two more times, first to Raymond T. Baker, with whom she had a daughter, Gloria Baker, and second, to Charles Minot Amory.

He was a grandson of Cornelius Vanderbilt II and Alice Claypoole Gwynne and was named in honor of his great-great-uncle George Washington Vanderbilt and his great-uncle George Washington Vanderbilt II. Vanderbilt's maternal grandfather, Isaac Edward Emerson, was a very wealthy businessman who made a fortune in a variety of business ventures including patent medicines, the most notable of which was Bromo-Seltzer. A sailing enthusiast, Emerson instilled a love for the sport in young George from an early age and as an adult, he used his sailing skills and wealth for scientific research.

He attended the St. Paul's School in Concord, New Hampshire and the Adirondack-Florida School studying at the Saranac branch in New York as well as in Miami.

== Inheritance and wealth ==
=== 1915–1929: Father's estate ===
George's father, Alfred G. Vanderbilt I, died in 1915 in the sinking of the RMS Lusitania. Under the terms of his will, George and his brother Alfred Gwynne Vanderbilt Jr. were named equal beneficiaries of their father's residuary estate, to be distributed after payment of debts and specific bequests. Appraisal proceedings before the New York Surrogate’s Court in 1917 reported that George’s share of the residuary amounted to $2,553,204.

The will directed that George’s portion be held in a trust during his minority, with the income payable to him until he reached adulthood. His principal was scheduled to vest in four equal installments—25% on his 21st, 25th, 30th, and 35th birthdays. George’s mother, Margaret Emerson Vanderbilt, also received a life interest in a $5,000,000 trust, the remainder of which was to pass in equal shares to George and Alfred Jr. on her death.

In 1919, the brothers jointly inherited an additional $1,700,000 that reverted to their father’s residuary estate. This amount represented the principal of a trust created as part of Alfred Sr.’s divorce settlement with his first wife, Elsie French, which terminated upon her remarriage.

In 1929, George received a further $1,000,000 as the result of a ruling by the Surrogate’s Court of New York concerning surplus funds in a trust established for his grandmother, Alice Claypoole Vanderbilt. This trust had been created under the will of George's grandfather Cornelius Vanderbilt II; the Court found in 1929 that the Trust had accumulated more income and principal than required to satisfy Alice’s fixed annuity of $250,000 per year. The court held that a surplus of approximately $2,000,000 should revert to the residuary estate of Cornelius Vanderbilt II. The terms of Cornelius' will designated Alfred G. Vanderbilt Sr as the beneficiary of his residuary estate; however, as Alfred had also died, the funds were treated as part of his residuary estate, which George and his brother Alfred Jr. were the equal co-beneficiaries of under the terms of their father's will.

A report submitted to the New York Surrogate's Court in October 1943 by the executors of Alfred G. Vanderbilt Sr.'s estate noted that $4,280,654 had been placed in Trust for George. By 1943 George had reached the age of 29, and had been paid $7,109,933 in income and capital distributions from the trust fund created for him from his father's estate. The remaining amount held in George's trust was $3,012,934, from which he would continue to receive the income until the remaining trust capital vested into his full ownership on his 30th and 35th birthdays.

=== 1931: Estate of Isaac Edward Emerson ===
Approximately $9 million of the $12.7 million estate of George's maternal grandfather, Isaac Edward Emerson, was placed in a 20-year Trust following Emerson's death in 1931. Under the terms of his grandfather's will, George was to receive 2% of the annual income, and 2% of the Trust Capital when it vested in 1951. His mother Margaret and her step-mother each received a 35.5% share of the trust. The value of the Trust was reported to be approximately $6,000,000 when the Trust vested in 1951, indicating that George's share would amount to $120,000, and his mother's share as $2,130,000.

=== 1934: Estate of Alice G. Vanderbilt ===
George, his brother Alfred, and his half-brother William shared a $500,000 bequest in the Will of their paternal grandmother Alice Claypoole Vanderbilt following her death in 1934.

=== 1940: Estimates by Alfred G. Vanderbilt Jr. ===
A profile of George's older brother Alfred Gwynne Vanderbilt Jr. in The New Yorker magazine included an estimate provided by Alfred of his inherited wealth (including trust funds) of $8,500,000; the article also noted that Alfred and George had received equal inheritances from the Vanderbilt and Emerson families.

=== 1950 - 1961: Divorce settlements ===
Vanderbilt married four times during his 47 years, and his series of divorce settlements reportedly diminished the fortune he had inherited from his father and grandfather. In 1958 his second wife Anita Zabala Howard Vanderbilt was awarded a $1,500,000 financial settlement in their divorce.

=== 1962: Estate ===
Following his death in 1962, George W. Vanderbilt III's personal estate (exclusive of real estate) was valued at slightly more than $3,000,000 for probate. His fourth wife and widow Louise Mitchell Vanderbilt received the income from a third share of George's residuary estate which was placed in a trust, as well as the Shadow Valley Ranch near Edgewood, California. His only daughter Lucille Vanderbilt Brady received a trust fund consisting of the remaining residuary estate as well as the Arcadia Plantation in Georgetown, South Carolina.

== Career ==
In 1936 and 1937, George Vanderbilt sponsored a renewal of auto races for the Vanderbilt Cup, founded by his uncle, William Kissam Vanderbilt II, in 1904.

During World War II, he served in the U.S. Navy like his two brothers. He was promoted to lieutenant on May 1, 1943, and received the Legion of Merit award.

=== Scientific research ===
Vanderbilt did not attend college, but by the time he turned 21, he had already led two expeditions to Panama and Africa, with some lasting up to 10 months, bringing back various snakes, fish, insects and birds. In 1937, he went on a six month with the Philadelphia Academy of Natural Sciences to the South Seas, bringing back 20,000 species of birds, fish and reptiles. He owned several yachts and used them to conduct scientific expeditions all over the globe. His voyages conducted important research in expeditions to Africa in 1934 and aboard the schooner Cressida, he made an ocean journey in 1937 to the South Pacific (visiting many islands with a wide geographic range) that carried out a systematic study of more than 10,000 fish specimens (434 species in 210 genera).

His fifth major expedition was on the schooner Pioneer in 1941 to the Bahamas, Caribbean Sea, Panama, Galapagos Archipelago and Mexican Pacific Islands.

He established the George Vanderbilt Foundation, of which he was president, for scientific research around marine biology. However, outside of academic circles, his important work has mostly been overshadowed by the lavish lifestyles and the Vanderbilt mansions of some of the other members of the Vanderbilt family.

== Personal life ==
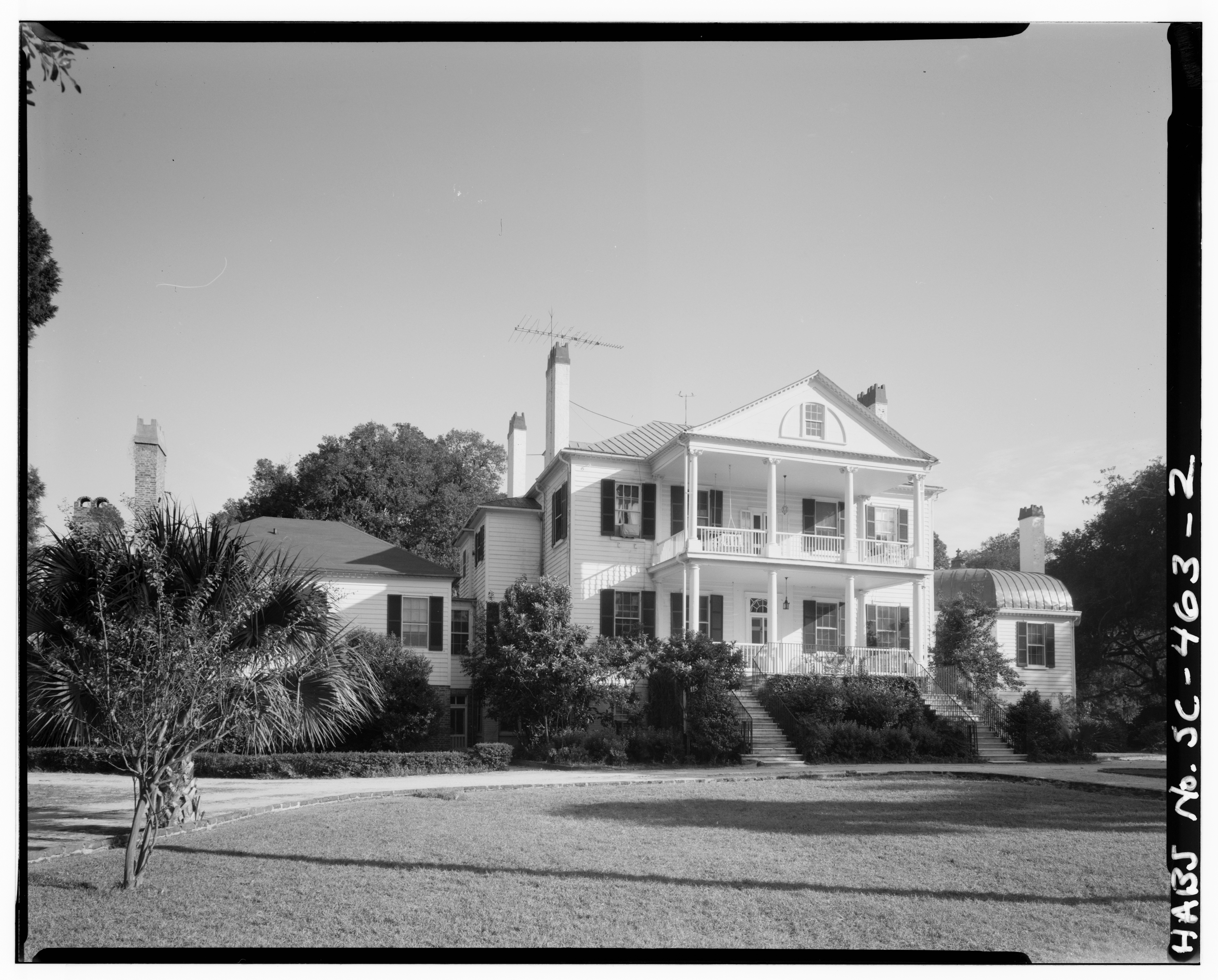
Arcadia Plantation in Georgetown, South Carolina

George Vanderbilt was married four times throughout his life. His first marriage was in 1935, when he married Lucille "Lulu" Miriam Parsons (1912–2013). Lulu was born in Montclair, New Jersey and her father, J. Lester Parsons, founded the international re-insurance firm of Crum & Forster in 1896. Together, George and Lulu had:

- Lucille Margaret Vanderbilt (1938–2018), who was married to Philip Brady, Jr from 1958 until their divorce 1962. Later in 1962, she married Robert Mathews Balding, divorcing in 1970. Her third and final marriage was to Wallace Fennel Pate (1933–1993).

In 1946, the Vanderbilts divorced. Lulu later married Ronald Bush Balcom (d. 1994), a champion skier who had previous attained celebrity when he became the third husband of Standard Oil heiress Millicent Rogers.

In 1946, Vanderbilt married Anita C. Zabala Howard at his home in South Carolina. She was a descendant of one of California's first Spanish families and the former wife of California sportsman Lindsay C. Howard. They divorced in 1958 after nearly 12 years of marriage.

In 1958, he married for the third time to Joyce "Josh" Branning, (1926–2016) daughter of Enid and Ralph Branning. They later divorced and, in 1963, she married Edward L. Doheny III (d. 1999), grandson of Edward L. Doheny.

On March 23, 1961, he married Louise Mitchell Paine in Scottsdale, Arizona. She was a member of the Board of Directors of the Children’s Cancer Fund of America and was the daughter of Harold E. Mitchell and had previously been married to Edward Bragg Paine (d. 1951). Edward's widow later married Lord Malcolm Douglas-Hamilton. Vanderbilt's marriage to Paine only lasted for three months as Vanderbilt died in June 1961.

=== Residences ===
In 1935, he purchased the 32-acre (13 ha) Charles W. Sloane estate on Middle Neck Road in Sands Point on the Long Island Sound, shortly after his first marriage. In 1937, he had commissioned a home by society architects Treanor & Fatio on the property. He sold the home to Henry Lustig, founder of the Longchamps chain of restaurants, in 1945.

In 1946, he purchased 1,500 acres (610 ha) in Siskiyou County near Lake Shastina and the Shasta–Trinity National Forest in northern California. In 1949, he built a large ranch house known as "Shadow Valley Ranch", along with a guest cottage, carriage house, tennis court, riding trails, waterfalls and several barns. The home was host to many important people of the times, including overnight guests Harry Truman, John Wayne, Audrey Hepburn, Spencer Tracy, Clark Gable, Alan Ladd and Ginger Rogers. The house was sold by his widow in 1990 and burned down in 2012.

He also lived in Honolulu, Hawaii for 25 years and owned the Arcadia Plantation in Georgetown, South Carolina, which had been purchased by his grandfather, Dr. Emerson, in 1906.

His former yacht, the Pioneer, is now the Yankee Clipper, which sails with passengers in the Caribbean for Windjammer Barefoot Cruises.

=== Death ===
On June 24, 1961, George Washington Vanderbilt apparently killed himself by leaping from his 10th floor suite at the Mark Hopkins Hotel in San Francisco, California. His wife said he was despondent over unspecified business setbacks. Investigators found large amounts of alcohol in his blood stream.
