= Alfred Gwynne Vanderbilt =

American businessman and sportsman (1877–1915)

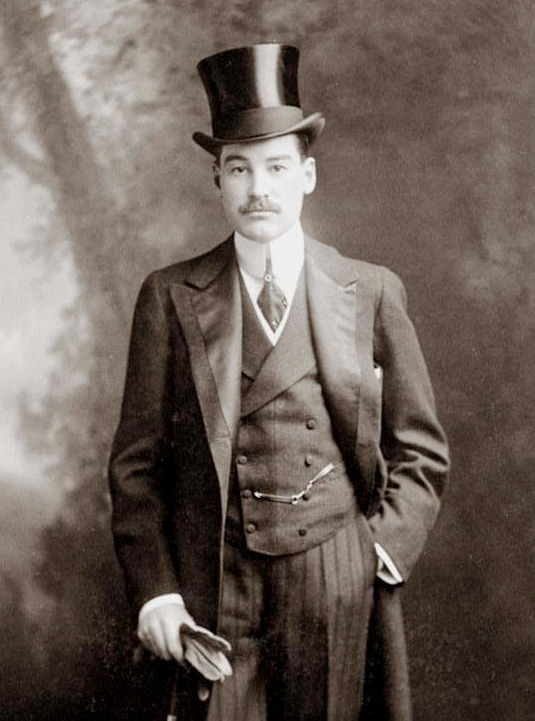
- Born: October 20, 1877; New York City, United States
- Died: May 7, 1915 (aged 37); Atlantic Ocean
- Education: St. Paul's School; Yale University (1899)
- Political party: Republican
- Spouses: Ellen Tuck French (m. 1901; div. 1908) Margaret Mary Emerson (m. 1911)
- Children: William Henry Vanderbilt III; Alfred Gwynne Vanderbilt Jr. George Washington Vanderbilt III
- Parent(s): Cornelius Vanderbilt II; Alice Claypoole Gwynne
- Relatives: See Vanderbilt family

Alfred Gwynne Vanderbilt Sr. (October 20, 1877 – May 7, 1915) was an American businessman and member of the Vanderbilt family. A sportsman, he participated in and pioneered a number of related endeavors. He died in the sinking of the RMS Lusitania.

== Early life ==
Vanderbilt was born in New York City, the third son of Cornelius Vanderbilt II and Alice Gwynne Vanderbilt.

Alfred Vanderbilt attended the St. Paul's School in Concord, New Hampshire, and Yale University (Class of 1899), where he was a member of Skull and Bones. Soon after graduation, Vanderbilt, with a party of friends, started on a tour of the world which was to have lasted two years. When the group reached Japan on September 12, 1899, he received news of his father's sudden death and hastened home as speedily as possible to find himself, by his father's will, the head of his branch of the family.

His eldest brother, William, had died in 1892 at age 22, and their father had disinherited Alfred's second-oldest brother Neily due to his marriage to Grace Wilson, a young debutante of whom the elder Vanderbilts strongly disapproved for a variety of reasons. Alfred received the largest share of his father's estate, though it was also divided among his sisters and his younger brother, Reginald.

== Career ==
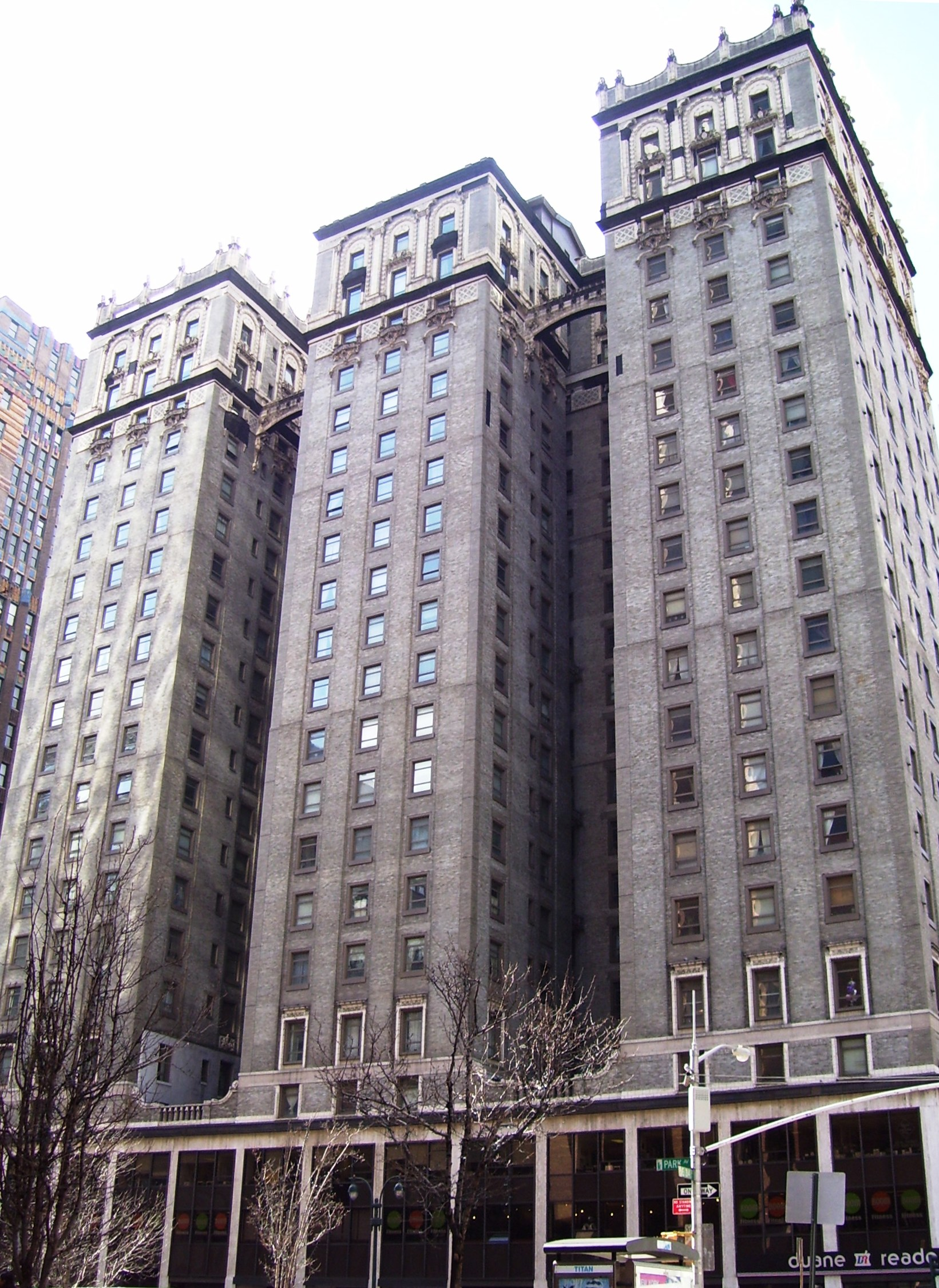
Vanderbilt Hotel, built in 1913

Soon after his return to New York, Vanderbilt began working as a clerk in the offices of the New York Central Railroad as preparation for entering into the councils of the company as one of its principal owners. Subsequently, he was chosen a director in other companies as well, among them the Fulton Chain Railway Company, Fulton Navigation Company, Raquette Lake Railway Company, Raquette Lake Transportation Company, and the Plaza Bank of New York.

Vanderbilt was a good judge of real estate values and projected several important enterprises. On the site of the former residence of the Vanderbilt family and on several adjacent plots, he built the Vanderbilt Hotel at Park Avenue and 34th Street, New York, which he made his city home.

Among Vanderbilt's many holdings were positions in the New York Central Railroad, Beech Creek Railroad, Lake Shore and Michigan Southern Railway, Michigan Central Railroad and Pittsburgh and Lake Erie Railroad as well as the Pullman Company.

== Personal life ==
On January 11, 1901, Vanderbilt married Ellen "Elsie" Tuck French, in Newport, Rhode Island, a close friend of Alfred's sister Gertrude Vanderbilt Whitney. Elsie was the daughter of Francis Ormond French, President of the Manhattan Trust Company, and Ellen Tuck, who was a daughter of New Hampshire politician Amos Tuck and half-sister of Diplomat Edward Tuck. On November 24, 1901, Elsie gave birth to their only child:

- William Henry Vanderbilt III (1901–1981), later governor of Rhode Island.

In March 1908, Elsie moved to the home of her brother, Amos Tuck French, in Tuxedo Park, New York. Shortly thereafter, a scandal erupted in April 1908 after Elsie filed for divorce, alledging that her husband had committed adultery with Agnes O'Brien Ruíz, the wife of the Cuban attaché in Washington, D. C. The publicity, which caused splits over whom to support, ultimately led Agnes Ruíz to commit suicide in 1909. Elsie, who remarried, died in Newport on February 27, 1948.

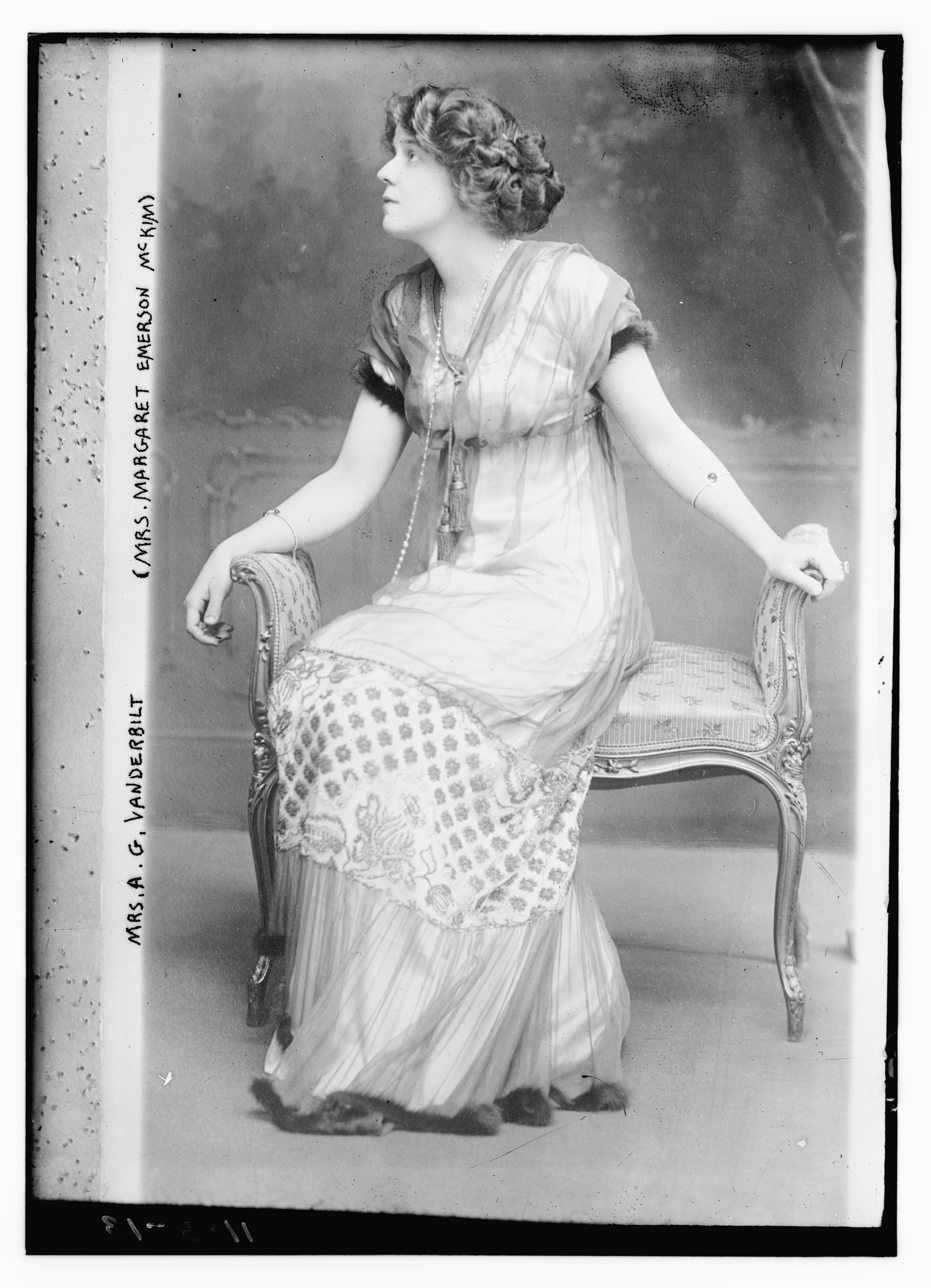
Margaret Emerson McKim

Vanderbilt spent considerable time in London after the divorce, and he remarried there, on December 17, 1911, to the wealthy American divorcée and heiress Margaret Emerson. Margaret was the daughter and only child of millionaire Bromo-Seltzer-founder Captain Isaac Edward Emerson and his first wife Emily Askew Dunn. Margaret had previously been married to Baltimore physician Dr. Smith Hollis McKim from 1902 to 1910. Together, Alfred and Margaret had two children:

- Alfred Gwynne Vanderbilt Jr. (1912–1999) a businessman and racehorse breeder,
- George Washington Vanderbilt III (1914–1961), a yachtsman and scientific explorer.

After Alfred's death aboard the Lusitania in 1915, Margaret bought a 316-acre estate in Lenox, Massachusetts, with a 47-room mansion. She remarried twice, first on June 12, 1918, in Lenox to Raymond T. Baker (1875–1935), a politician with whom she had a daughter, Gloria Baker (1920–1975).

== Wealth and inheritance ==
=== Inheritance ===
Alfred's father Cornelius Vanderbilt II died in September 1899; during the following weeks the terms of Cornelius' will sparked a minor controversy within New York society when it was revealed that Vanderbilt's eldest surviving son, Cornelius Vanderbilt III, had been effectively disinherited, and was to receive a substantially smaller share of his father's estate compared to his siblings. In his place Vanderbilt's second surviving son, Alfred Gwynne Vanderbilt, was named as the principal beneficiary under the terms of the will, inheriting over half of their father's $73,000,000 fortune. Cornelius Vanderbilt II also bequeathed to Alfred the Gold Congressional Medallion awarded to the founder of the family fortune Cornelius "The Commodore" Vanderbilt I by the United States Congress in 1864—this heirloom had come to symbolise headship of the Vanderbilt family. The final version of the will bore the date 18 June 1896, the same date originally intended for the wedding of Cornelius Vanderbilt III to Grace Wilson despite his parents' disapproval of the union.

As a result of his older brother's dispute with his parents, Alfred's inheritance amounted to approximately $42,000,000.

=== Estate ===
Following Alfred's death aboard the RMS Lusitania in 1915, his estate underwent extensive probate proceedings in the Surrogate's Court of New York. His widow, Margaret Emerson Vanderbilt, who had already remarried by 1917, made the formal claim on the estate. Estimates of its total value vary significantly depending on whether inter vivos gifts, trust funds, and divorce settlements are included.

A 1917 appraisal filed in the New York County Surrogate's Court valued the gross estate in the State of New York at $16,769,314 and identified a separate trust fund worth an additional $4,612,086. After the payment of debts, funeral expenses, and administrative costs, the net value of the estate within New York was calculated at $15,594,836.32 (equivalent to $289,042,225 in 2025). These figures may not have reflected additional holdings located in other states or abroad. Contemporary newspaper reports noted that the largest individual bequest in New York—valued at $5,100,930—went to his widow Margaret.

Historian Edwin P. Hoyt, writing in 1962, estimated that the total value of Alfred's worldwide estate following his death was approximately $26,375,000, whilst also noting two large financial transfers that occurred during Alfred's lifetime:

- A gift of $6,000,000 to his older brother Cornelius Vanderbilt III following their father's death in 1899
- A $10,000,000 divorce settlement paid to his first wife, Elsie French Vanderbilt, in 1908

Under the terms of Alfred's will, the bulk of his estate was divided amongst his widow and three sons:

- A total of $8,000,000 was bequeathed to his second wife, Margaret Emerson Vanderbilt (including $5,100,930 from New York assets), which included:
  - $2,000,000 per the couple's ante-nuptial agreement, which was treated as a debt against Alfred's gross estate;
  - $1,000,000 as an outright bequest to Margaret; and,
  - $5,000,000 placed in a trust fund from which Margaret would receive the income during her lifetime, after which the Trust would vest into the ownership of their sons Alfred Jr. and George Vanderbilt.
- Alfred's Oakland Farm estate in Rhode Island was bequeathed to his eldest son William Henry Vanderbilt III
- A $5,000,000 trust fund Alfred had received from his own father's will (valued at $4,612,086 in 1917) was also bequeathed to William H. Vanderbilt III
- A life interest in $400,000 and the Congressional Gold Medal originally awarded to Cornelius Vanderbilt, which had passed through three generations to his oldest son William Henry Vanderbilt III
- $500,000 to Alfred's younger brother, Reginald Claypoole Vanderbilt
- The residuary estate (valued in 1917 at approximately $5,100,000) was divided equally between Alfred's two younger sons, Alfred Gwynne Vanderbilt Jr. and George Washington Vanderbilt III, whose shares were initially worth approximately $2,550,000 each.

In addition to these bequests, Alfred maintained several estates and residences—including Oakland Farm in Rhode Island, a Fifth Avenue townhouse in New York, and a London residence—alongside a large staff. According to the findings of the U.S. Mixed Claims Commission (established to adjudicate Lusitania-related damage claims), Vanderbilt expended approximately $300,000 annually (equivalent to $5,560,345 in 2025) for the support and comfort of his wife and children in the years prior to his death.

In 1929, a further sum of approximately $2,000,000 was awarded to Alfred's residuary estate following a decision by the Surrogate's Court of New York. The amount represented surplus principal and income from a trust fund created for Alfred's mother, Alice Claypoole Vanderbilt, under the will of his father Cornelius Vanderbilt II; as Alfred had been named as the residuary beneficiary of his father's estate, the court ruled that the surplus which had accumulated during Alice's widowhood should revert to Alfred's own estate. As Alfred had predeceased his mother, the $2,000,000 was treated as part of his residuary estate. Consequently Alfred's two younger sons each received an additional $1,000,000 from their father's estate.

The 1864 Congressional Gold Medal which had passed to each successive oldest son of the Vanderbilt Family (with the exception of Alfred's older brother Cornelius Vanderbilt III) was later bequeathed by Alfred's oldest son William Henry Vanderbilt III to the latter's only son William Henry Vanderbilt IV in 1981. William H. Vanderbilt IV later donated the medal to Vanderbilt University in 2022.

=== Interests ===
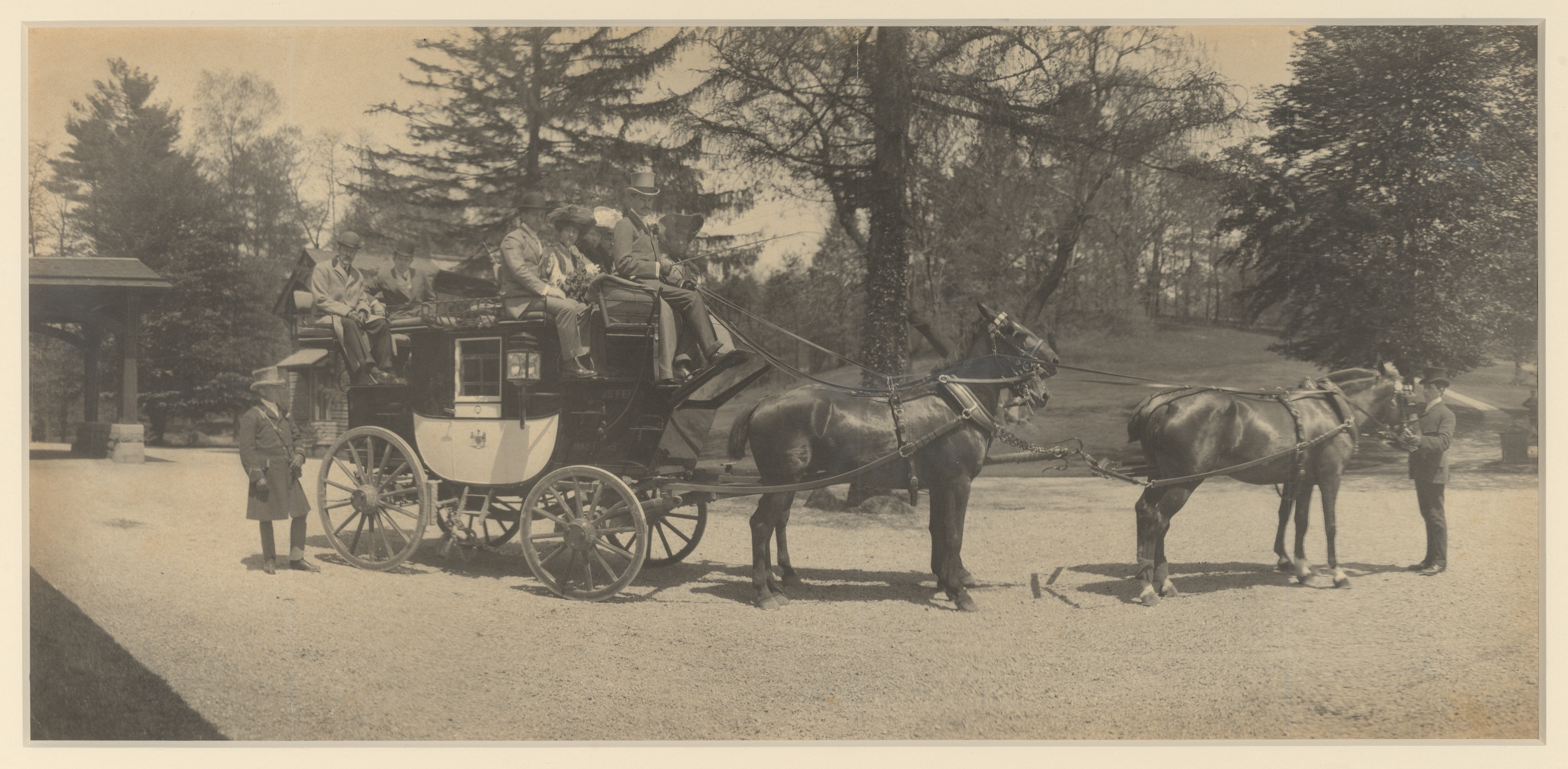
Alfred Vanderbilt driving the Coaching Club's Pioneer

Vanderbilt was a sportsman, and he particularly enjoyed fox hunting and coaching. In the late 19th century, he and a number of other millionaires, such as James Hazen Hyde practiced the old English coaching techniques of the early 19th century. Meeting near Holland House in London, the coaching group would take their vehicle for a one-day, two-day, or longer trip along chosen routes through several counties, going to prearranged inns and hotels along the routes. Vanderbilt would frequently drive the coach, in perfectly appareled suit, a coachman or groom. He is recorded as a regular guest at the Burford Bridge Hotel near Box Hill in Surrey where, when driving from London to Brighton, he would stop to take lunch and to collect telegrams. He loved the outdoor experience.

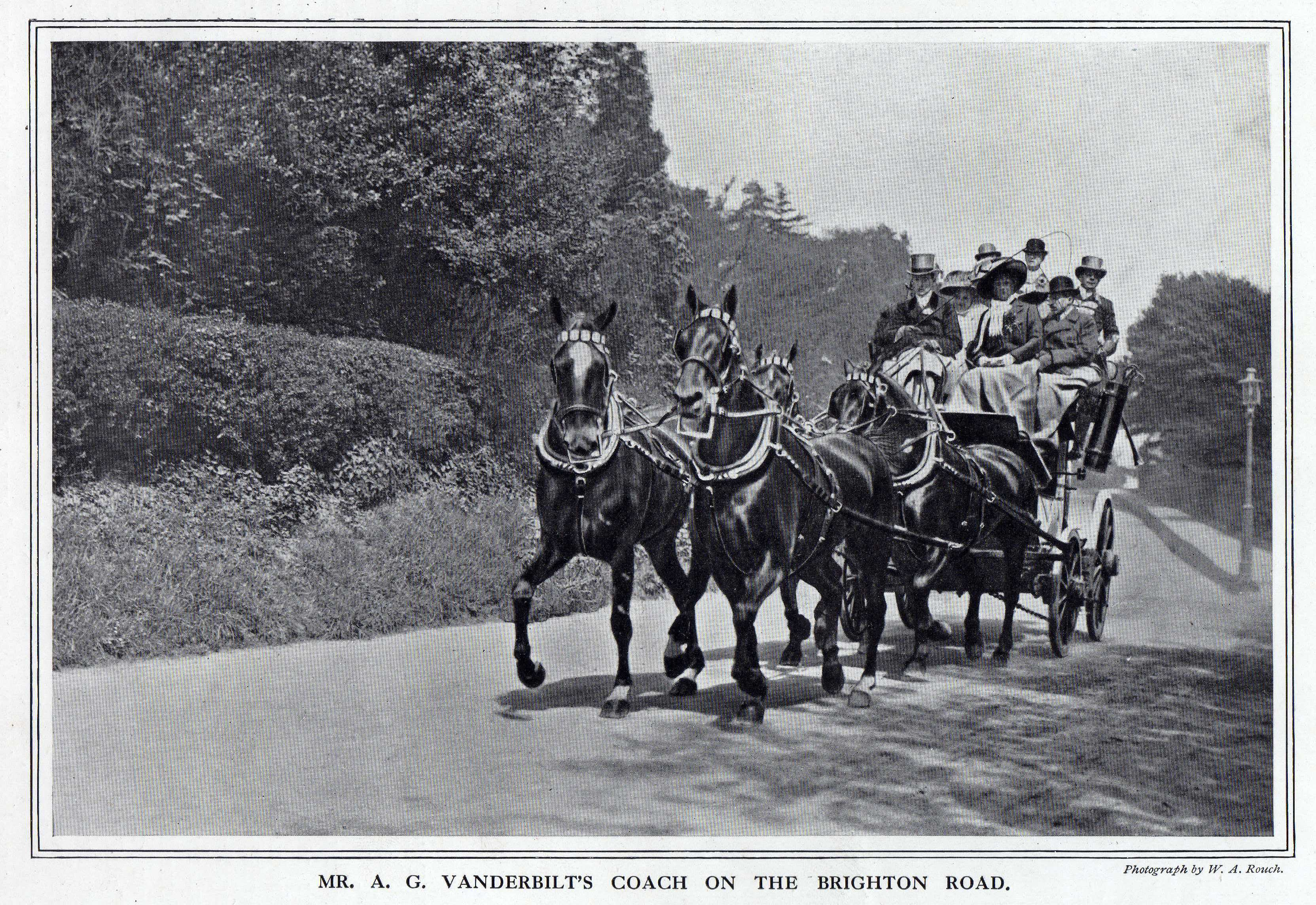
Vanderbilt's coach, Venture

Vanderbilt was a member of the Coaching Club of New York and his coach, which was named Venture, was custom built in 1903 by coachbuilders Brewster & Co. The coach, actually a "heavy park drag – made road style" was restored by the Preservation Society of Newport County and is on display at The Breakers.

In 1902, he bought Great Camp Sagamore, on Sagamore Lake in the Adirondacks, from William West Durant. He expanded and improved the property to include flush toilets, a sewer system, and hot and cold running water. He later added a hydroelectric plant and an outdoor bowling alley with an ingenious system for retrieving the balls. Other amenities included a tennis court, a croquet lawn, a 100,000 gallon reservoir, and a working farm.

In 1908, he donated $100,000 to build the Mary Street YMCA (today the Vanderbilt Hotel) in Newport, Rhode Island, in memory of his father Cornelius Vanderbilt II (1843–1899). Ground breaking was on August 31, 1908, with the cornerstone laid on November 19, 1908, by Vanderbilt. The dedication was on January 1, 1910.

=== RMS Lusitania ===
On May 1, 1915, Vanderbilt boarded the RMS Lusitania bound for Liverpool as a first class passenger. It was a business trip, and he traveled with only his valet, Ronald Denyer, leaving his family at home in New York.

On May 7, off the coast of County Cork, Ireland, the German U-boat U-20 torpedoed the ship, triggering a secondary explosion that sank the giant ocean liner within 18 minutes. Vanderbilt and Denyer helped others into lifeboats, and then Vanderbilt gave his lifejacket to save a female passenger. Vanderbilt had promised the young mother of a small baby that he would locate an extra lifevest for her. Failing to do so, he offered her his own life vest, which he proceeded to tie on to her himself, since she was holding her infant child in her arms at the time. Many considered his actions especially noble since he could not swim and he knew there were no other lifevests or lifeboats available. Because of his fame, several people on the Lusitania who survived the tragedy were observing him while events unfolded at the time, and so they took note of his actions. He and Denyer were among the 1,199 passengers who did not survive the incident. His body was never recovered.

== Legacy ==
Memorials

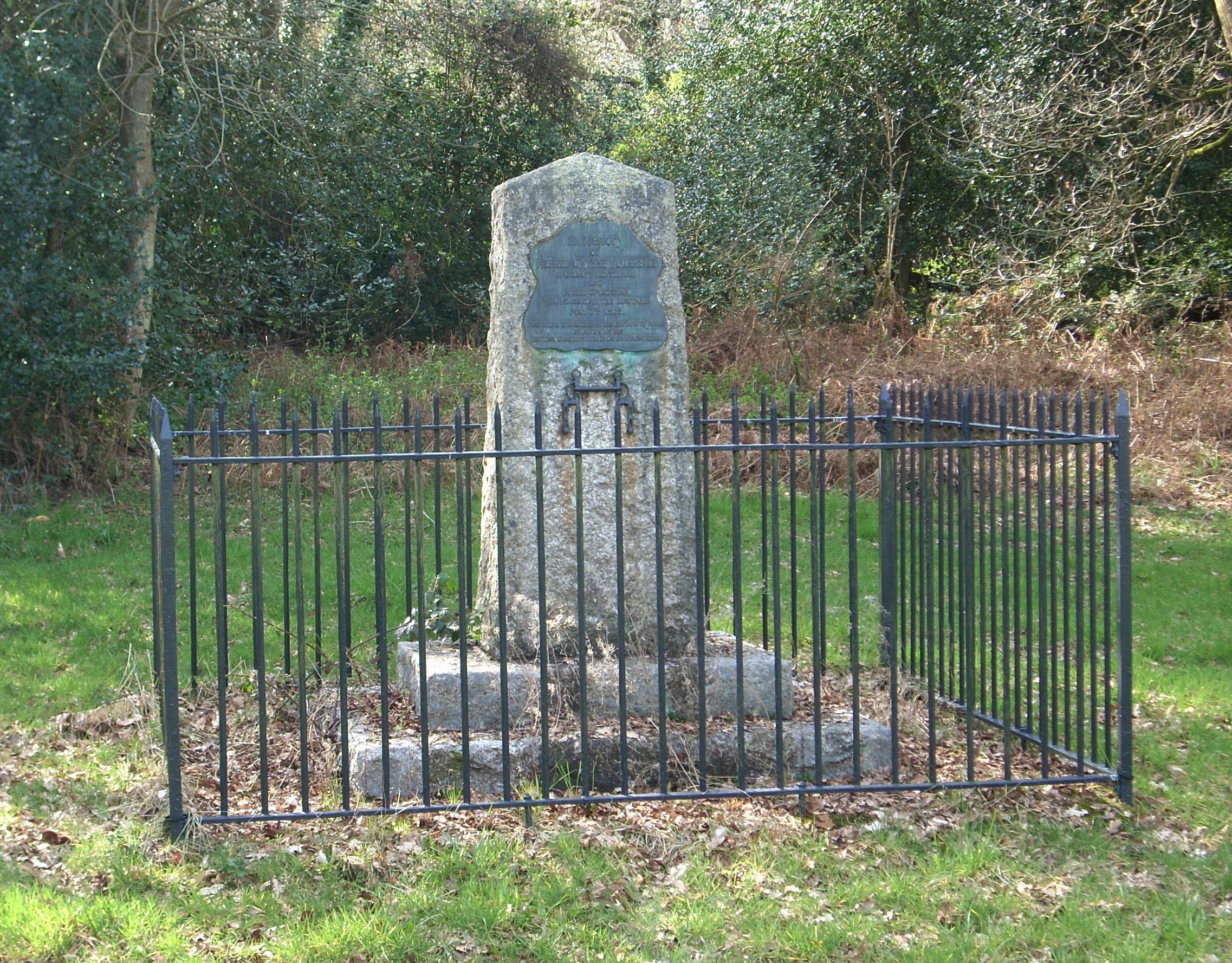
A24 memorial in Holmwood

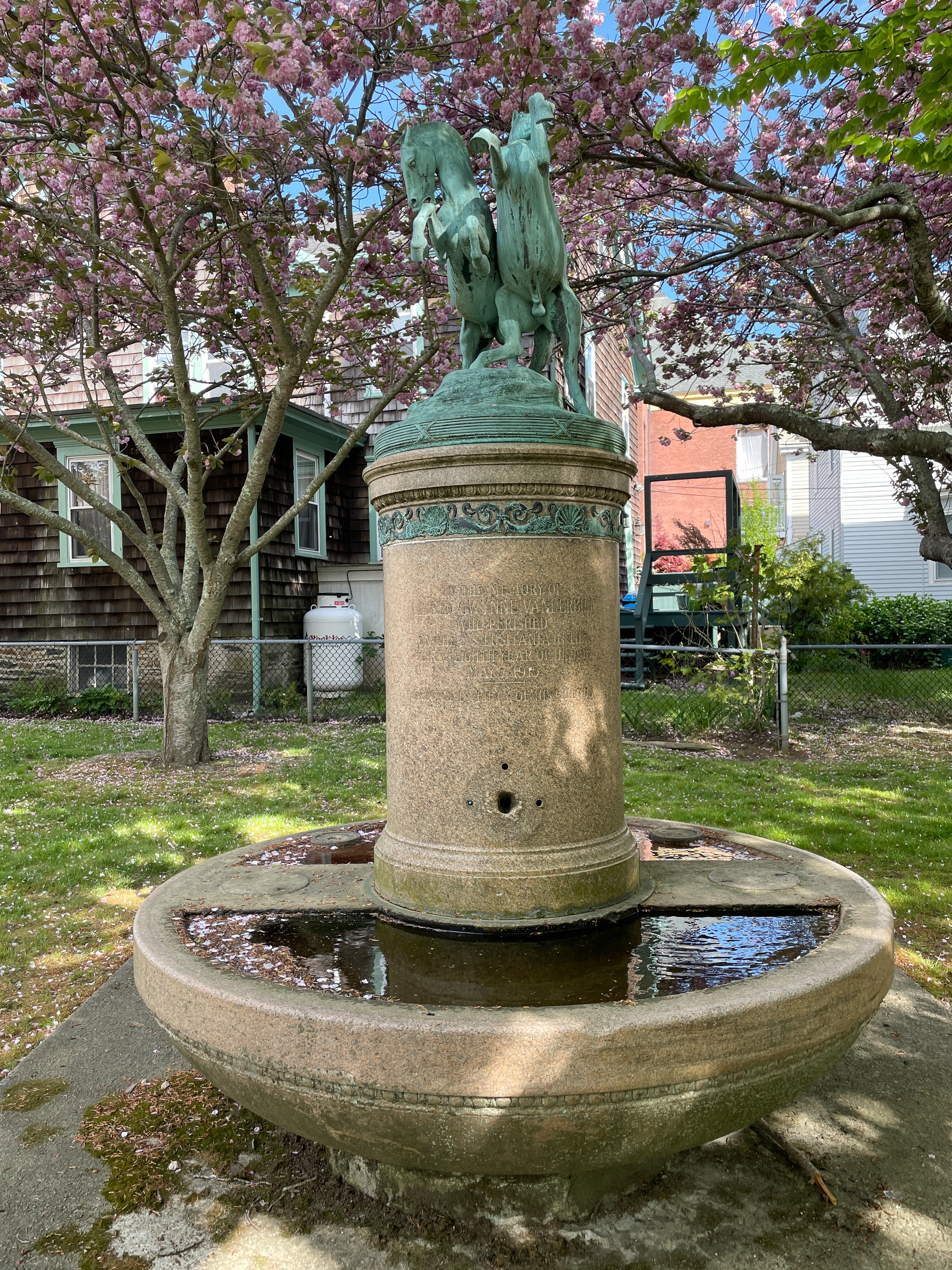
Fountain in Newport

A memorial was erected on the A24 London to Worthing Road in Holmwood, just south of Dorking. The inscription reads, "In Memory of Alfred Gwynne Vanderbilt, a gallant gentleman and a fine sportsman who perished in the Lusitania May 7th 1915. This stone is erected on his favorite road by a few of his British coaching friends and admirers".

A memorial fountain to Vanderbilt is in Vanderbilt Park on Broadway in Newport, Rhode Island, where many members of the Vanderbilt family spent their summers. The memorial reads: "To the Memory of Alfred Gwynne Vanderbilt, who perished on the S.S. Lusitania in the Thirty-eighth year of his age May 7, 1915. Erected by fifty of his friends."

== Children ==
By Elsie French Vanderbilt:

- William Henry Vanderbilt III, Governor of Rhode Island and business executive.

By Margaret E. McKim Vanderbilt

- Alfred Gwynne Vanderbilt Jr., naval officer, Silver Star recipient, horse breeder and President of Belmont Park.
- George Washington Vanderbilt III, naval officer, explorer and scientist.
