= Leonard Usina =

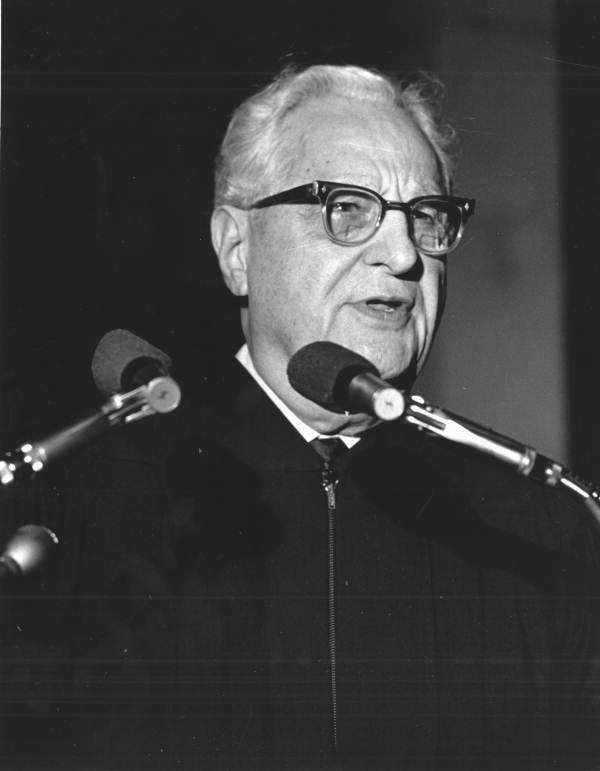
- Leonard Usina in 1968
- Born: Leonard Ambrose Usina; 1891; St. Augustine, Florida, United States
- Died: 1981 (aged 89–90); Miami
- Occupation: Banker

Leonard Usina (1891–1981) was an American banker and philanthropist in the twentieth century who worked primarily in Miami, Florida, and St. Augustine, Florida.

== Early life ==
Leonard Ambrose Usina was born in St. Augustine, Florida, in 1891. He was one of six children born to Domingo B. Usina and Polonia Theodora Genovar.

== Career ==
Leonard Usina began his banking career in Florida in the early twentieth century. In 1904 he started working for the Peoples Bank for Savings in St. Augustine. This affiliation lasted until 1906 when he began working for the First National Bank of St. Augustine, where he worked until 1909. At that time he took the position of assistant cashier at The Commercial Bank in St. Augustine, which he held until 1912. Usina then moved north to Jacksonville, Florida to work as manager of the transit department at the Heard National Bank. In 1915 he was elected cashier for the Bank of South Jacksonville.

In 1932 Usina moved to Miami while working under Edward Ball for the Florida National Bank and Trust. In 1950, he created his own bank, the Peoples Bank of Miami Shores. In April 1972 his bank acquired a majority share of the Capital National Bank and it was renamed the Peoples National Downtown Bank, its main goal being the rebuilding and revitalization of downtown Miami. At the end of 1972, Usina's bank had earned a profit of $28,000, after being in debt of $400,000 the previous year.

== Personal life and legacy ==
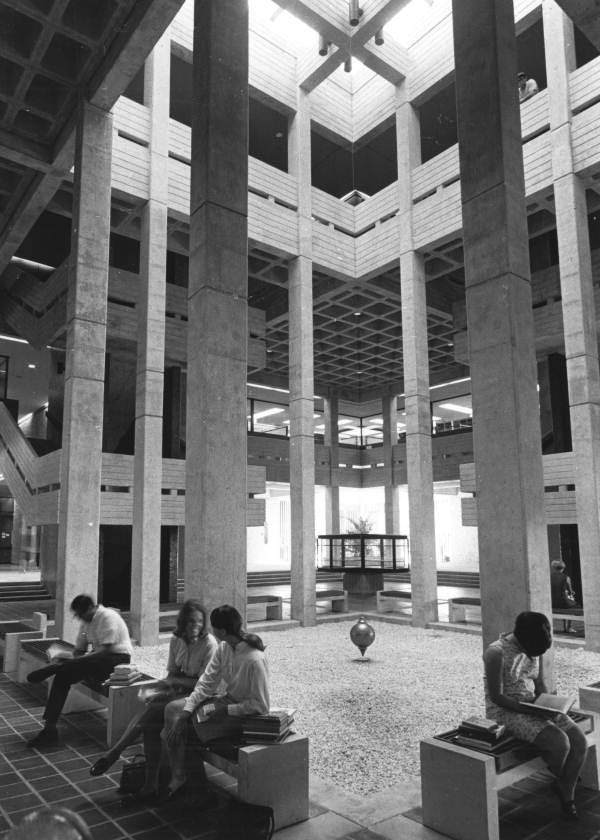
Usina Hall of Science

While in Miami, Usina lived in a penthouse in the Brickell neighborhood. In 1954, he was awarded the Silver Medallion by the Miami branch of the National Conference of Christians and Jews (known since 2011 as the MCCJ). This group stresses the benefits of diversity through education, awareness, and conflict resolution.

In the 1960s Usina was on the Board of Trustees for Biscayne College in Miami. He was also on the Board of Directors of the Florida Historical Society.

Leonard Usina was the first vice-chairman of the St. Augustine Historical Restoration and Preservation Commission, an organization that would become the Historic St. Augustine Preservation Board.

In 1968 Miami Shores Chamber of Commerce nominated Leonard Usina as its "Citizen of the Year," to celebrate his contribution to the greater Miami area and his role of chairman of the Peoples First National Bank of Miami Shores.

Usina's wife, Olivia Anna Walsh, died in 1972.

In October 1981, Usina died at the age of 89 in Miami. Pan American Bank purchased most of Usina's bank branches following his death. The exception was the downtown Miami branch. North Carolina National Bank from Charlotte, North Carolina purchased this branch in 1982.

The Leonard Usina Hall of Science at Miami Dade College, Kendall Campus, is named for him.
