= Whitehall (Narragansett, Rhode Island) =

Coordinates: 41.4078°N 71.4588°W

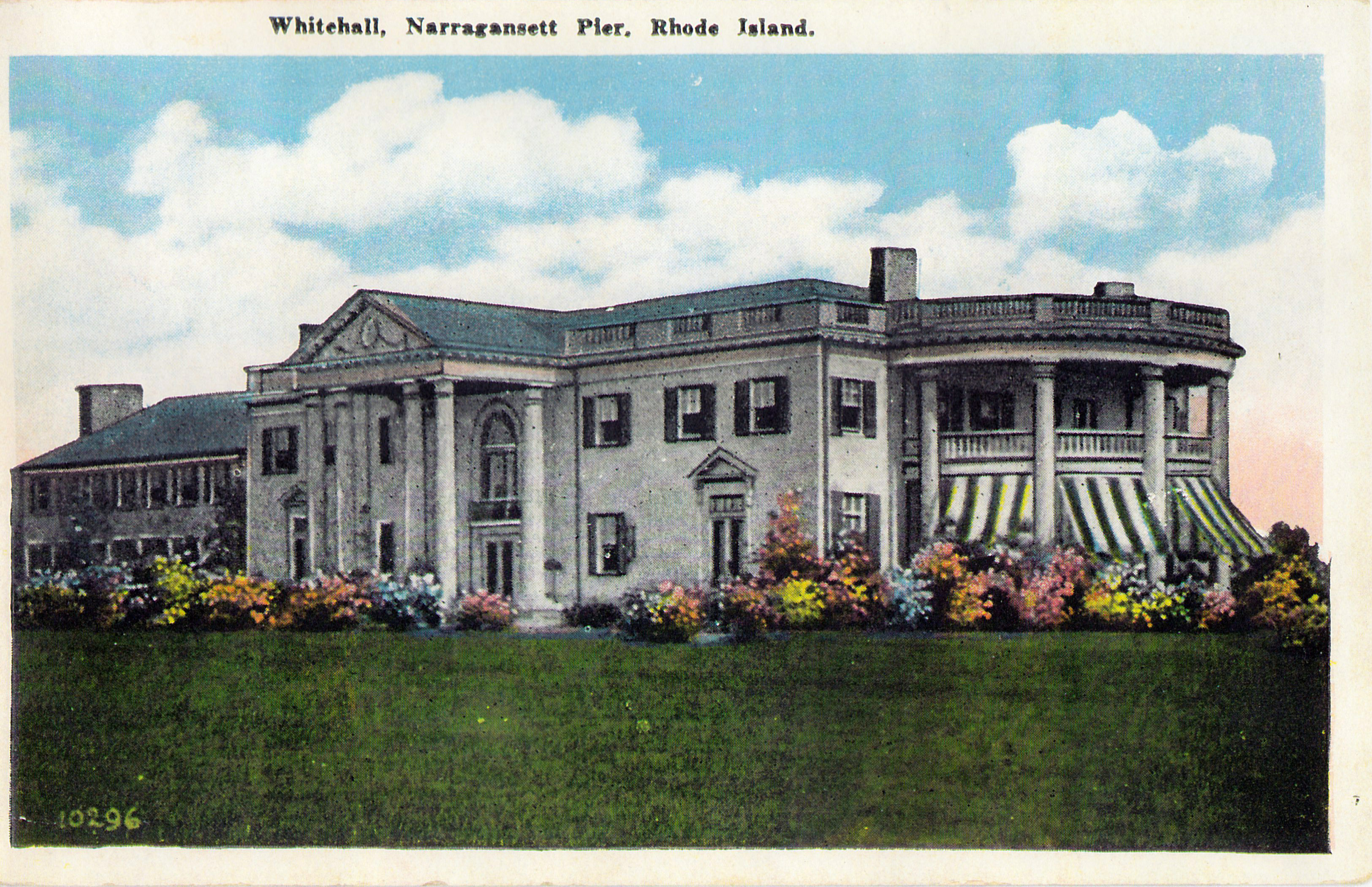
Whitehall, Narragansett Pier

Whitehall was the palatial summer estate at Narragansett Pier built by Captain Isaac Edward Emerson, inventor of the headache remedy Bromo-Seltzer. The architect was Joseph Evans Sperry of Baltimore.

== Summer villa ==
Built in 1917, the estate was situated on peninsula overlooking the Atlantic Ocean. It occupied 12 acres of park-like grounds on the ocean side of Ocean Road and included a large rose garden, stable and music gazebo/bandstand. The main building of brick and stucco had 7 bedrooms each with fireplaces and private baths. It had several large open porches, a winding staircase and dining and living rooms for entertaining. The north wing held 10 servant's rooms and a separate building held a 6 car garage and additional servant's quarters.

== Lavish entertainers ==
Emerson and his second wife, Anne Preston McCormack Emerson, were widely known in American and European society and were considered lavish entertainers. They used their yachts and summer villa Whitehall to host parties and social gatherings of the wealthy and prominent persons of the era.

== Demise ==
Upon Captain Emerson's death in 1931, the estate was passed to his wife, Anne Preston McCormack Emerson. Anne spent many summers at the estate until her death in the mid-1940s, when it was passed to her son from a previous marriage, Frederick C. McCormack, with the stipulation that upon his death it would be sold and the proceeds invested for Frederick's daughter Margaret. In December 1947, Frederick put a bullet in his head, reportedly over an unrequited love affair with Princess Desiree Windisch-Graetz. The estate was then purchased at auction by an ex-immigrant and liquor dealer Antonio F. Rotelli. Mr. Rotelli used it as a summer home for his large family for many years. Upon his death in 1969, the main house was deemed too expensive to keep up and too large to live in. It was demolished in 1971.
