= Mission Bank =

American commercial bank

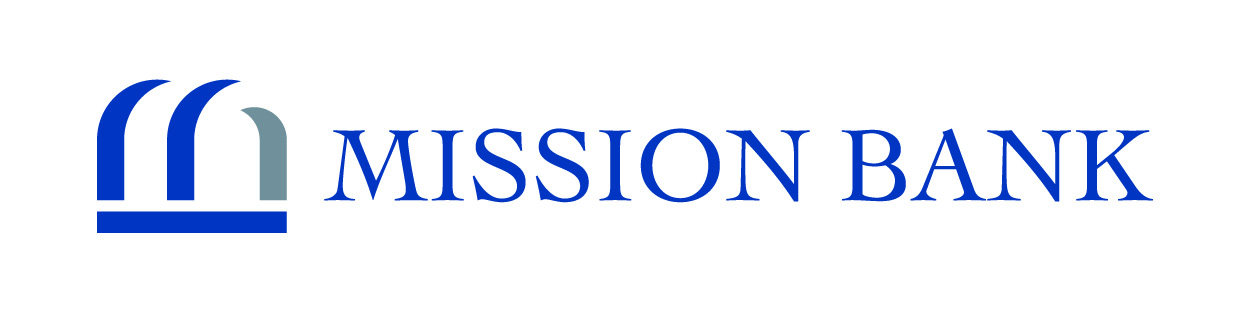

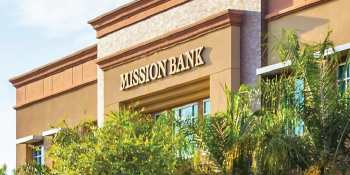
- Trade name: MBSC
- Industry: Banking
- Founded: October 17, 1998
- Headquarters: Bakersfield, California
- Key people: Board Chairman Bruce Beretta, President and CEO AJ Antongiovanni, CFO/COO Jason Castle, CCO Michel Congdon, and CBO Bryan Easterly
- Products: Business Banking and Commercial Lending Services
- Total assets: $1.92 billion
- Website: https://www.missionbank.bank/

Mission Bank is an American commercial bank specializing in business banking and commercial lending. Mission Bank is headquartered in Bakersfield, California with nine physical locations across Los Angeles, Ventura, Kern, San Luis Obispo, and Tulare Counties.

Mission Bank is a subsidiary of parent company Mission Bancorp and is traded on OTCID as MSBC. Mission Bancorp is $1.92 billion in assets as of March 31, 2026.

== History ==
Mission Bank was founded in October 1998 in Bakersfield, California by a group of local business owners. The bank expanded to Shafter, California in June 2006.

Mission Bank 1031 Exchange was formed in August 2007 to facilitate IRS Section 1031 property exchange transactions for bank customers and the community at large.

Mission Bank merged with Mojave Desert Bank in January 2013, expanding to Lancaster, California.

Mission Bank's Riverwalk location in west Bakersfield opened in August 2014. Mission Bank expanded to Ventura County in October 2017, San Luis Obispo, California in October 2020, Visalia, California in March 2023, Westlake Village, California in July 2025, and to North San Luis Obispo County in January 2026.

Mission Bank currently holds a Five Star Rating from BauerFinancial, holds the classification of Super Premier Performance by The Findley Reports, and was named in The 20 Top Performing Public Banks Under $2 Billion in Assets in 2024 and 2025 by American Banker Magazine.

== Operations ==
Mission Bank is a community bank focused on business banking and commercial lending.

Mission Bank offers business loans, agricultural loans, and SBA loans as well as business credit cards, business checking accounts, fiduciary accounts, money market accounts, and certificates of deposits. Mission Bank also offers digital banking services including treasury management services, online banking, and remote deposit capture.
