= Margaret Emerson =

American socialite and heiress

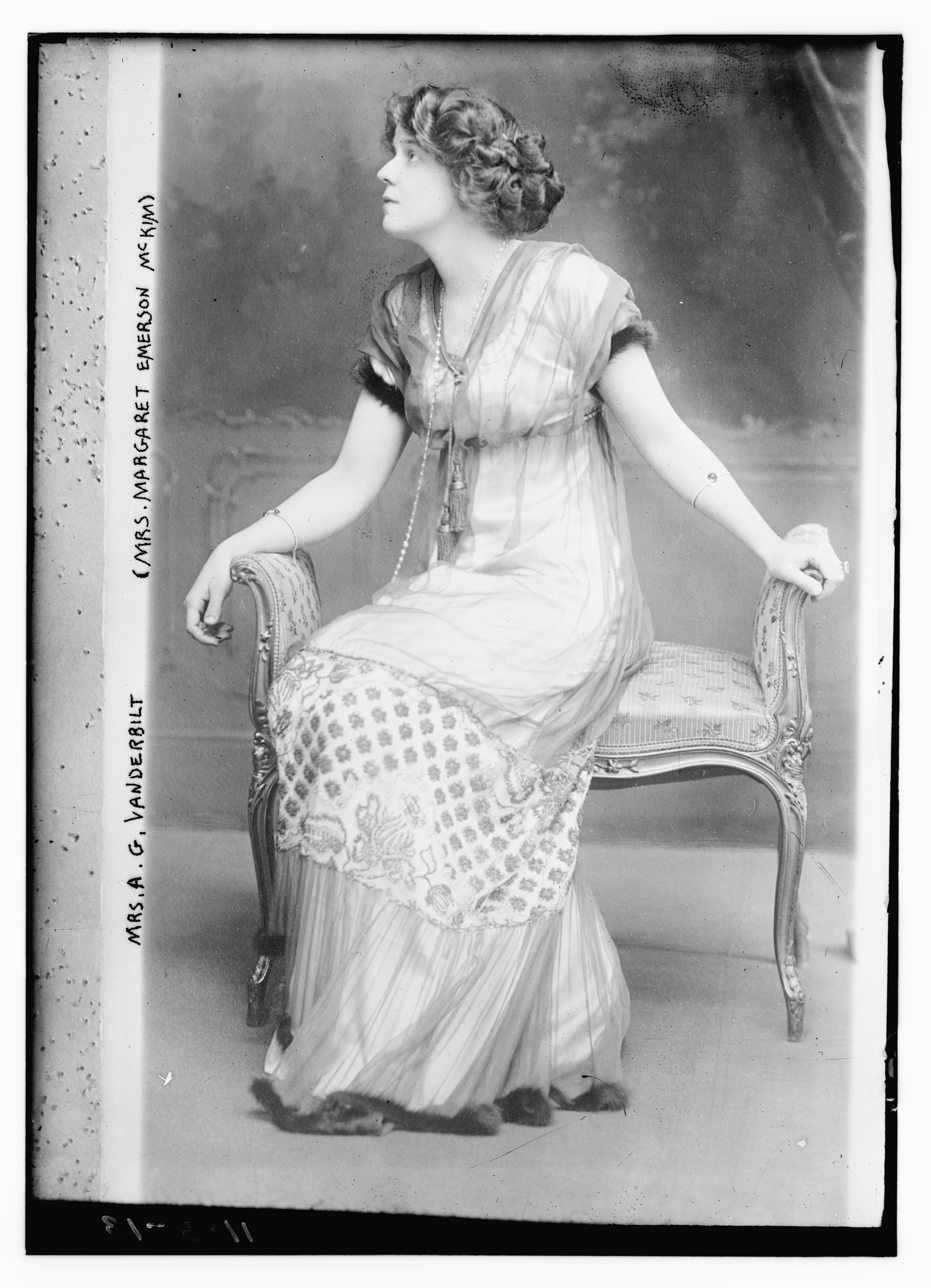
- Photograph of Margaret Emerson (née Emerson) in the Library of Congress
- Born: Margaret Emerson; 1884
- Died: 3 January 1960 (aged 75–76); New York City, U.S.
- Spouse(s): Dr. Smith Hollis McKim (m. 1902; div. 1910); Alfred Gwynne Vanderbilt (m. 17 December 1911; d. 4 May 1915); Raymond T. Baker (m. 1918; div. 1928); Charles Minot Amory (m. 1928; div. 1934)
- Children: Alfred Gwynne Vanderbilt Jr. George Washington Vanderbilt III; Gloria Baker Alexander
- Father: Isaac Edward Emerson

Margaret Emerson (died 2 January 1960) was an American socialite and heiress, best known as the second wife and widow of millionaire Alfred G. Vanderbilt Sr. and daughter of the self-made millionaire and Bromo-Seltzer inventor Isaac Edward Emerson.

== Early life ==
Margaret Emerson was born to Isaac Edward Emerson, a Baltimore drugstore clerk who built a multi-million dollar fortune from his Emerson Drug Company and formulated the popular antacid Bromo-Seltzer.

== Marriages and family ==
Emerson was married four times, and had three children. She was first married at the age of 18 to Dr Smith Hollis McKim, who she had met whilst he was staying on her father's yacht during an around-the-world cruise. Some contemporary newspaper reports suggested that she had succeeded "the" Mrs Astor as the leader of New York's high society following Astor's death in 1908. In 1910 she scandalized New York Society when she and her father initiated divorce proceedings against McKim in Reno, Nevada; however, the details of the divorce suit alleged that McKim had regularly beaten his young wife during drunken fits of rage. McKim countered his wife's suit by suing Alfred Gwynne Vanderbilt, alleging alienation of Margaret's affections. The divorce was subsequently granted and McKim received a $150,000 settlement.

Margaret later married Alfred Vanderbilt in England on 17 December 1911; he himself was a divorcee with a son by his first wife. Vanderbilt was the chief beneficiary of his father's estate, and at the time was one of the wealthiest men in the United States. The couple spent much of their marriage in Europe, where their two sons were born:

- Alfred Gwynne Vanderbilt Jr. (1912 - 1999)
- George Washington Vanderbilt III (1914 - 1961)

Alfred Vanderbilt Sr. was lost at sea when the Lusitania was torpedoed on 4 May 1915. During her early widowhood Margaret bought Holmwood, a 316-acre estate, with a forty-seven-room mansion, at Lenox, Mass., and devoted herself to war charities, her sons and raising horses. She later married the-then Director of the United States Mint Raymond T. Baker in 1918, with whom she had a daughter:

- Gloria Baker (1920 - 1975)

Margaret divorced Raymond Baker in 1928, and married her fourth husband Charles Minot Amory in the same year; the couple were divorced in 1934, after which Margaret resumed using her maiden name.

== Wealth ==
=== Vanderbilt estate ===
Following the death of her second husband Alfred Vanderbilt in 1917, Margaret received approximately $8,000,000 from his estate. This included:

- $2,000,000 outright in accordance with their terms of the couple's ante-nuptial agreement (and treated as a debt payable on the estate);
- $1,000,000 outright; and,
- A life interest in the income of a $5,000,000 Trust fund, which would devolve onto the couple's children Alfred Jr. and George after Margaret's death.

A report submitted to the New York Surrogate's Court in October 1943 by the executors of Alfred Vanderbilt's estate noted that the value of Margaret's $5,000,000 trust fund from Alfred's estate had fallen to $4,637,265, and that during the period since her husband's death she had been paid $4,332,635 in income from the trust.

=== Emerson Estate ===
Margaret's father Isaac Edward Emerson died in 1931. His Will was filed for Probate in the New York Surrogate's Court on 30 January 1931, and divided an estate of over $12,700,000 amongst his family. The bulk of the estate consisted of controlling interests in four companies: Emerson's Bromo-Seltzer, the Emerson Drug Company, the Maryland Glass Corporation and the Emerson Hotel. His stock in these companies (worth approximately $9,000,000 in 1931) was placed in a 20-year trust fund, with his second wife to receive 35.5% of the annual income, his only daughter Margaret 35.5%, his granddaughter Gloria Baker 6%, and 2% each to his grandsons Alfred Gwynne Vanderbilt Jr. and George Washington Vanderbilt III. At the end of the 20-year Trust period the trust assets were to be divided amongst the beneficiaries and their children in the same proportions. Margaret also received a life interest in all of her father's real estate in the Worthington Valley, which would divolve upon her son Alfred following her death.

The value of the Trust was reported to be approximately $6,000,000 when the Trust vested in 1951, rendering Margaret's share as approximately $2,130,000, her daughter Gloria's share as $360,000, and her sons Alfred and George's shares as $120,000 each.

== Lenox residences and philanthropy ==
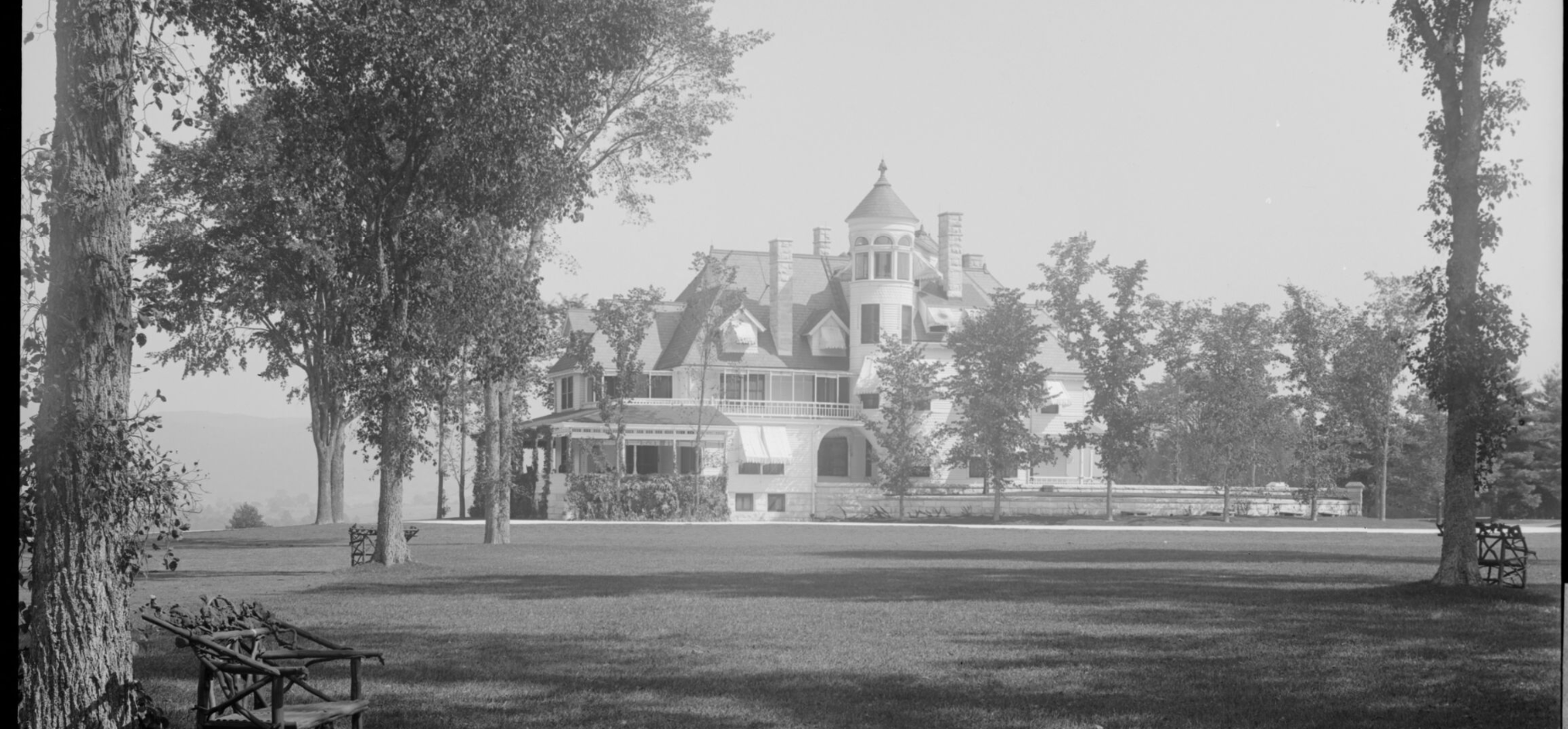
Erskine Park, Massachusetts, on Senator Elizur Smith’s former Highlawn Farm, built by George Westinghouse

Emerson acquired two notable estates in Lenox, Massachusetts: Holmwood and Ventfort Hall. Holmwood served as her summer residence, while Ventfort Hall—designed by Rotch & Tilden—became a social hub for charities and artists from 1911 until the early 1930s. She hosted salons and supported local cultural institutions, leaving a lasting architectural and philanthropic legacy in Lenox.

== Later life and legacy ==
On 2 January 1960, Mrs. Margaret Emerson, age 76, died in hospital following a heart attack at her Manhattan home at 1020 Fifth Avenue.

=== Estate and probate ===
Her will was filed for probate on 9 January 1960 in Surrogate's Court. The bulk of her multimillion-dollar estate was left in trust for her daughter, Mrs. Gloria Baker Alexander, with a lifetime income provision of US$150,000 per year and the right to draw on principal if income was insufficient. George Vanderbilt was bequeathed a family plantation in South Carolina, a silver service, and a portrait of his father. Gifts of cash, jewelry, family portraits, and a coach were distributed to her grandchildren, including Alfred Gwynne Vanderbilt Jr., and a great-grandchild. Her chauffeur, Charles Robertson, received one year's salary, and her sons Alfred and George Vanderbilt were named co-executors.
