= Inland Bank =

Former bank in Illinois

Inland Bank & Trust
- Type: Privately held company
- Industry: Banking
- Founded: April 1, 1977; 49 years ago
- Fate: Merged with and into Byline Bank
- Headquarters: Oak Brook, Illinois
- Key people: Peter Stickler, CEO; Daniel Goodwin, Chairman
- Net income: $8.8 million (2019)
- Total assets: $1.123 billion (2019)
- Parent: Independent (1977–2008); Inland Real Estate Group (2008–23); Byline Bancorp (2023)
- Website: www.inlandbank.com

Inland Bank & Trust was an Oak Brook, Illinois finance company controlled by Inland Real Estate Group until mid-2023. With all of its ten branches located in Chicago's western suburbs, the bank invested approximately one-third of its assets in commercial real estate.

As part of the $129 million merger between Inland Bancorp and Byline Bancorp in July 2023, Inland Bank & Trust merged its operations into Byline Bank.

== History ==
Founded in 1977 as Bank of Villa Park, the banking institution had its name changed twice until 2008: Bank of Illinois in DuPage (May 1987) and AmeriMark Bank (July 1997). In May 2008, Inland Bancorp acquired AmeriMark Bank and its name was changed to Inland Bank & Trust.

In November 2012, the FDIC and Illinois Division of Banking reversed a unique arrangement that let the bank appear profitable during the Great Recession by shifting responsibility for losses to an undisclosed sister company owned by Goodwin.

Inland Bank submitted bids to the FDIC for multiple banks while the arrangement enabled it to hide losses, and won a 2011 bid for First Choice Bank in Geneva, Illinois. Prior to the regulatory intervention, Inland Bank had tripled in size in five years by acquiring First Choice Bank and banks in Countryside, Illinois and Lake Zurich, Illinois.

An Oak Park-based consultant to community banks at the time told Crain’s Chicago Business that “You don't want outliers with regard to financial institutions. This was an outlier. Regulators just want to know if you're healthy or you're not healthy. . . . Why should (Inland) be treated differently than the other $1 billion-plus banks in the same situation?”

The consent order ending the loss-share agreement also led to Goodwin and other shareholders injecting $30 million in new equity into the bank. Regulators lifted the order in July 2013.

It received a total of $731,404 in financial awards from the United States Department of the Treasury’s Bank Enterprise Award Program (“BEA”) from 2009 to 2013 while the loss-share agreement and then the consent order were in effect. The Treasury Department has faced criticism concerning whether it was appropriate to reward Inland Bank while it was hiding loses in sister companies and whether Inland Bank should have received a reward for supporting Pan American Bank while both banks were majority-owned by Goodwin.

Fifteen months after launching digital, card-linked coupons, the bank announced in September 2014 that it had expansion plans with the goal of becoming a public company via an initial public offering. In October, the Illinois Securities Department issued a subpoena regarding Inland Bank’s transactions with Inland American Real Estate Investment Trust (now InvenTrust Properties), with the possibility that investors in InvenTrust covered losses incurred by the bank as a result of a usual loss-sharing agreement.

In February 2017, Thomas Marvinac was appointed executive vice president and chief credit officer. In March, the bank was sued for racial discrimination regarding a loan modification request; however, the court ruled in favor of the bank via summary judgment.

=== College Savings Bank ===
In 2015, the bank cancelled the acquisition of College Savings Bank of Princeton, New Jersey after the Federal Deposit Insurance Corporation objected to the transaction. The owners of College Savings account filed a $12 million lawsuit against Inland, claiming it withheld information.

In 2019, the courts ruled in favor of Inland, in part, via summary judgment.
