= NCino =

American financial technology company

nCino, Inc.
- Type: Public
- Traded as: Nasdaq: NCNO; Russell 1000 component
- Industry: Banking software
- Founded: 2011; 15 years ago
- Founders: James "Chip" S. Mahan III; Neil Underwood; Pierre Naude; Nathan Snell; Pullen Daniel
- Headquarters: Wilmington, North Carolina, U.S.
- Key people: Sean Desmond (CEO); Greg Orenstein (CFO); April Reiger (CLCO)
- Revenue: ▲US$595 million (2025)
- Net income: ▲US$5.18 million (2025)
- Number of employees: 1,833+ (April 1, 2025)
- Website: ncino.com

nCino, Inc. is a global financial technology company headquartered in Wilmington, North Carolina. The company offers its cloud-based banking software and core banking platform. The nCino Platform is used by banks and credit unions, and enterprise financial institutions.

As of 2025, nCino is used in more than 2,700 financial institutions across the globe, including TD Bank, Truist Financial, and Santander Bank. nCino's strategic partners include Accenture, Deloitte Digital, PwC and West Monroe Partners.

Until February 2025, Pierre Naudé served as CEO. In February 2025, Naudé became Executive Chairman of the Board, and Sean Desmond was appointed to CEO.

== History ==
nCino was founded by a team of bankers in 2011.

In 2013, nCino hosted its first nSight user conference. In 2017, nCino opened its first international office in London, England. In 2018, nCino expanded to Sydney, Australia. nCino opened an office in Canada, and formed a joint venture to the Japanese market. Also in 2019, the company announced the launch of nCino IQ, an artificial intelligence and machine learning software.

In July 2019, nCino acquired Visible Equity, a financial analytics software company based in Salt Lake City, Utah. In November 2019, nCino acquired FinSuite, a software company based in Melbourne, Australia. In January 2022, nCino closed its acquisition of Utah-based company SimpleNexus, a digital homeownership platform.

In 2024, nCino acquired DocFox, a company that automates onboarding customers for commercial and business banking, and FullCircl, a Customer Lifecycle Intelligence platform. In February of 2025, nCino completed its acquisition of SandBox Banking, a company who provided digital transformation services.

== Funding and IPO ==
nCino was originally founded as a majority-owned subsidiary of Live Oak Bancshares, a bank holding company.

In 2013, nCino raised $9 million in investment funding from a group of investors. In 2014, nCino received its Series A investment, a $10 million round, from Wellington Management Company. In February 2015, nCino secured an additional $29 million in a Series B Financing, led by Insight Venture Partners. In 2018, nCino received a $51 million Series C round of venture funding led by Salesforce Ventures. In October 2019, nCino received a raise of $80 million in its Series D round of funding led by T. Rowe Price Associates.

nCino has been a Salesforce partner since its founding in 2012. On July 13, 2020, nCino’s Registration Statement on Form S-1 relating to the IPO of common stock was declared effective by the SEC. In connection with the IPO, nCino issued and sold 9,269,000 shares of common stock (including shares issued pursuant to the exercise in full of the underwriters' option to purchase additional shares) at a public offering price of $31.00 per share for net proceeds of $268.4 million, after deducting underwriters' discounts and commissions.

== Philanthropy and sponsorship ==
In 2021, nCino donated $1.3 million to the city of Wilmington sports complex park. Formerly known as the Cape Fear Regional Sports Park, the park is now named the nCino Sports Park and is scheduled to open in the fall of 2022.

nCino partnered with the Food Bank of Central & Eastern North Carolina in the fall of 2021, pledging to donate $1 million over a five-year period toward a new Hunger Solutions Center.

== Legal issues ==
=== Antitrust and wage suppression investigations ===
nCino faced antitrust investigations and a lawsuit in 2021. The company filed an SEC Form 8-K in February 2021, stating it received grand jury subpoenas from the Department of Justice's Antitrust Division seeking information on its hiring and wage practices. In March 2021, a class-action lawsuit was filed alleging nCino, Live Oak Bank, and Apiture conspired to avoid hiring each other's employees.

The Department of Justice closed its investigation into nCino in February 2023, stating there would be no further action taken in the matter. Live Oak Bank settled the class action lawsuit for $4.65 million in March 2022. In August 2023, nCino agreed to pay $2.2 million to resolve related civil no-poach antitrust claims. nCino denied wrongdoing as part of the settlement.

=== Insider trading allegations ===
In September 2022, nCino's then majority owner, Insight Ventures, as well as the nCino board members were sued by The City of Hialeah Employee Retirement System for "using nonpublic information about ongoing discussions between nCino and SimpleNexus to substantially increase its investment and ownership interests in SimpleNexus before the transaction took place." On December 28, 2023, the Delaware Court of Chancery granted in full Insight and nCino’s motion to dismiss the complaint. On September 12, 2024 the Delaware Supreme Court summarily affirmed the dismissal of the complaint its entirety.
