= Live Oak Bank =

U.S. financial services company

Live Oak Bancshares, Inc.

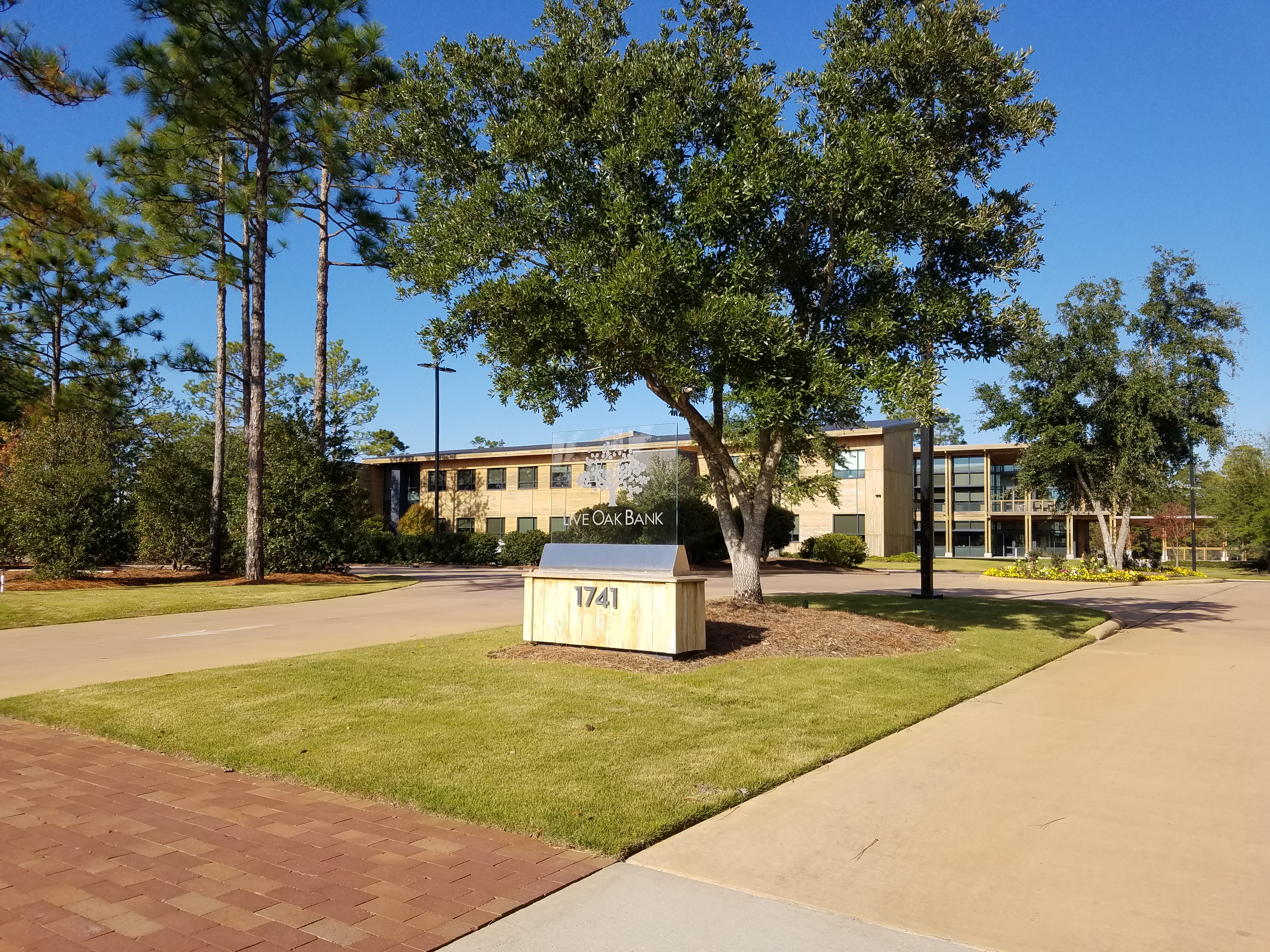
- Headquarters in Wilmington, NC
- Type: Public
- Traded as: NYSE: LOB; Russell 2000 Component
- Industry: Banking
- Founded: 2008; 18 years ago
- Headquarters: Wilmington, North Carolina
- Key people: James S. Mahan III, (chairman and CEO); William C. (BJ) Losch III (president); Walter J. Phifer (CFO), Live Oak Bancshares
- Total assets: ▲$15.13 billion
- Total equity: ▲$1.25 billion
- Number of employees: 1,040 (2025)
- Website: www.liveoakbank.com

Live Oak Bank, a subsidiary of Live Oak Bancshares, Inc., is an American bank. Headquartered in Wilmington, North Carolina, it serves small business owners and was the largest SBA 7(a) lender by dollar volume in fiscal year 2025.

== History ==
Founded in 2008 by James S. (Chip) Mahan III, Live Oak initially focused on lending to niche industries such as veterinarians and dentists. Today, the bank lends to more than 35 specialized industries in all 50 states and has more than a dozen general lenders in markets across the country that directly serve small business owners. The bank specializes in SBA and USDA loans and offers business and personal deposit products on its branchless, digital platform.

In 2017, Live Oak Bank established an office in Washington, D.C. to handle the company’s loans in the fields of renewable energy and government contracting. Live Oak also announced a joint venture with the payment technology company First Data in October 2017, which became the joint company Apiture. In December 2017, Live Oak announced the opening of a lending segment in the automobile industry.

Scott Custer served as the company’s president from April 2017 to September 2018, when he resigned from his position to work on a community bank startup.

In 2018, Live Oak Bank signed its first partnership with cloud-based core banking software company Finxact. By 2020, Live Oak was using the Finxact platform for its loan origination processes. By 2021, the company had switched its retail and commercial deposit accounts to Finxact.

Live Oak entered the venture banking industry in 2019. Huntley Garriott was appointed president of Live Oak Bank in September 2019 after he left his position as a partner at Goldman Sachs & Co.

Live Oak Bank established a satellite office at the N.C. State University Centennial Campus in Raleigh, North Carolina in 2020. The new office was established to house Live Oak Labs, the company’s technology unit.

In 2021, Live Oak Bank became the official sponsor for the Live Oak Band Pavilion, an amphitheater and live concert venue in Wilmington, North Carolina previously known as the Riverfront Park Amphitheater. In the same year, Live Oak announced plans to build a small business center named Channel in downtown Wilmington. Live Oak hired Kevin Doyle as its VP of small business lending in 2021. On June 7, 2021, former Ally Financial chief digital officer Renato Derraik also joined Live Oak as its chief information and digital officer. Former First Horizon Bank CFO William "B.J." Losch also joined Live Oak as its CFO.

Live Oak Bank established offices in Dallas in 2022. In 2022, Live Oak Bank also launched Tidal Small Business Checking, its first small business checking product. In December 2022, Live Oak Bank transferred stock from Nasdaq and began trading on the NYSE under its current ticker symbol, LOB.

Live Oak Ventures, the investing arm of Live Oak Bancshares, has made investments in various companies that align with its investment thesis including Pharmacy Marketplace, Finxact, Asset Class, Uplinq and more.

As of 2023, Live Oak Bank was the fourth-largest state chartered bank in North Carolina and had approved more SBA-sponsored loans than any other bank within the previous six years. The company fell to the position of second-largest SBA lender in 2024, but regained the spot of largest SBA 7(a) lender by dollar volume in fiscal year 2025. In 2023, the company also received a new four-story office in Wilmington constructed by contractors Swinerton and Monteith.

In August 2023, “BJ” Losch, the company’s chief financial officer became the president replacing Huntley Garriott.

Live Oak currently operates as a branchless bank, only doing business with clients online. In addition to its main headquarters in Wilmington and its offices in Dallas, Raleigh, Charlotte, and California.

=== Live Oak timeline ===
- 2008 - Live Oak Bank founded
- 2011 – nCino created by Live Oak’s founders
- 2012 - $1.2 billion originated
- 2013 – Live Oak Ventures formed
- 2014 – nCino spun out to shareholders
- 2014-17 – Live Oak was awarded “Best Bank to Work For” by American Banker
- 2015 – Live Oak Bank files for its initial public offering (Nasdaq: LOB).
- 2015 – Launch of Digital Bank
- 2017-2020 – Named the number one SBA 7(a) lender in the country
- 2017 – Apiture was founded in a joint venture with First Data and is part of Live Oak’s fintech ecosystem.
- 2018 – Business model shifts to holding loans
- 2019 – Live Oak is named the highest dollar volume USDA lender in the country
- 2019 - $10.95 billion originated
- 2020 – Canapi Venture launches $545 million fintech investment fund
- 2020 – Live Oak Bank goes live on Finxact core

== Subsidiaries ==
=== nCino ===
Live Oak spun its banking software division out into a separate entity named nCino in 2012. nCino develops software such as nCino IQ, an artificial intelligence and machine learning platform that automates and improves functions in the company’s bank operating system.

=== Apiture ===
Apiture is an open API banking platform founded in 2017 as a joint venture between First Data Corporation and Live Oak Bank with offices in Wilmington, North Carolina, and Austin, Texas.

=== Live Oak Private Wealth ===
Live Oak Private Wealth, an SEC‐registered investment advisory firm, launched in 2018 under Live Oak Bancshares and is based in Wilmington, N.C. Live Oak Private Wealth offers a full spectrum of financial services including investment and wealth advisory services, wealth analytics and solutions, portfolio development, business, estate, retirement and financial planning, technical insights and cash management. Live Oak Private Wealth acquired Jolly Asset Management in 2020.

=== Canapi Ventures ===
Canapi Ventures (previously known as Live Oak Ventures) is a venture capital firm investing in early to growth‐stage fintech companies. It launched its $650 million fintech fund in 2020 to support innovation in financial services. Canapi Ventures is advised by Canapi Advisors, LLC, a wholly owned subsidiary of Live Oak Bancshares, Inc. and CenterHarbor Advisors, an indirect subsidiary of CenterHarbor Holding Company, owned and controlled by Gene Ludwig, former Comptroller of the Currency and the Co‐Founder of Promontory Interfinancial Network. Ludwig and Chip Mahan, Live Oak Bancshares Chairman and CEO, are co-managing partners. The team includes several other financial services and venture capital veterans including Live Oak Bancshares President Neil Underwood, and partners Walker Forehand, Dan Beldy and Jeff Reitman, as well as Senior Advisors Jeffrey Goldstein and Jim Hale. Canapi has offices in Wilmington, N.C., Washington, D.C. and New York City.

== Legal issues ==
A class-action lawsuit was filed in March 2021 alleging that Live Oak Bank, nCino, and Apiture conspired to avoid hiring each other's employees. Previously, Live Oak Bank disclosed receiving a letter in December 2020 from a law firm representing an individual alleging violations of antitrust laws. In March 2022, Live Oak Bank reached a $4.65 million settlement agreement along with Apiture, to be distributed among approximately 1,911 employees who have worked at the three companies since 2017.
