= Newtek Bank =

American direct bank headquartered in Miami, Florida

Newtek Bank, N.A

- Corporate HQ of Newtek Bank in Miami
- Formerly: National Bank of New York City
- Type: Subsidiary
- Traded as: Nasdaq: NEWT
- Industry: Banking, Financial Services
- Founded: 1963; 63 years ago in New York City, U.S.
- Headquarters: Miami, FL, United States
- Area served: United States
- Key people: Barry Sloane (Chairman & CEO)
- Total assets: ▲US$3.18 billion (2026)
- Number of employees: 431
- Parent: Newtek One
- Website: newtekbank.com

Newtek Bank is an American direct bank headquartered in Miami, Florida, that specializes in SBA 7(a) loans. Founded in 1963 as the National Bank of New York City, it was acquired in 2023 by NewtekOne, Inc. and operates as its wholly owned subsidiary.

As of November 2026, Newtek Bank was the second largest SBA 7(a) lender by number of loans. Its share of nonperforming loans has also increased in recent years.

== History ==
The National Bank of New York City was founded in 1963 and headquartered in Flushing, New York. It operated from a single branch and primarily made commercial real estate loans.

Newtek Business Services, later renamed NewtekOne, agreed to acquire the National Bank of New York City in 2021. It completed the acquisition on January 6, 2023, and renamed the bank Newtek Bank.

Following the acquisition, Newtek Bank promoted its new digital banking services built on the Apiture platform. Over the next two years, deposits grew from $140 million to $1.5 billion.

In 2026, NerdWallet named the Newtek Bank High Yield Savings as the "Best Savings Account" based on the interest rate offered, fees, minimum balance requirements, and digital platform, among other factors.

The company has had a growing share of non-performing loans, reaching 9.96% of total assets in Q3 2026. CEO Barry Sloane attributed this performance to high interest rates and inflation, while an analyst at Piper Sandler described the company's credit picture as "mixed".
