= SBA 7(a) Loan =

Type of small business loan

The seal of the SBA

The U.S. Small Business Administration's SBA 7(a) Loan program is the SBA's primary business loan program for providing financial assistance to small businesses. It is designed to expand access to financing to current and prospective American small business owners. The program is so named because it was originally created by Section 7(a) of the Small Business Act of 1953, which also created the SBA itself.

The 7(a) program is a public-private partnership. The lenders make the credit decisions and lend the money, as with a conventional loan, while the U.S. federal government provides a partial guarantee of the loan to the lender. This guarantee incentivizes the lender to make riskier credit decisions, allowing them to lend to a wider array of borrowers than they would otherwise.

The 7(a) program is designed to operates as a zero-subsidy program, operating without taxpayer funds. This is possible due to loan fees charged by the SBA, which typically bring in more revenue than the SBA must pay out in guarantees for unsuccessful loans.

70,242 SBA 7(a) loans were approved in FY2024, worth a combined $31.1 billion.

== Uses ==
SBA 7(a) loans have a wide array of uses. Common uses for SBA 7(a) loans include:

- Real estate purchase
- Business purchase (full or partial)
- Construction
- Loan refinance
- Working capital
- Equipment/machinery purchase
- Furniture, fixture, and supply purchase
- Multiple purpose loans, including any of the above

== Eligibility ==
=== Business ===
To be eligible to receive an SBA 7(a) loan, a business must:

- Be an operating, for-profit business
- Be located in the U.S. (including territories)
- Be a small business, per SBA size requirements
- Be creditworthy and demonstrate a reasonable ability to repay the loan
- Not be a type of ineligible business
- Not be able to obtain the desired capital from a conventional loan

Notably, investment businesses (any business where the majority of revenue is from rent, such as multifamily housing, strip malls, etc.) are ineligible for SBA 7(a) loans.

=== Personal ===
All owners must:

- Be a US citizen or US national

All owners of 20% or more of the business must:

- Not be currently incarcerated or under indictment
- Not have a previous failed government-backed loan

== Terms ==
=== Maximum loan value ===
$5,000,000

=== Minimum down payment ===
None on loans $500,000 or below and loans over $500,000 that don't include a change of ownership, 10% on loans over $500,000 that include a change of ownership.

=== Interest rate ===
Based on the prime rate.

No set minimum, but typically at least prime + 1%.

By rule may be no higher than prime + 3% for loans $350,000+ (but can be higher for smaller loans).

=== Loan term ===
Maximum term of 25 years for loans involving real estate and 10 years for loans not involving real estate.

=== Collateral ===
Must be fully collateralized if possible. Some common forms of collateral taken by the lender are the real estate involved in the loan (if applicable), a business's account's receivable or inventory, and an owner's personal assets.

=== Personal guarantee ===
Required from all owners of over 20% of the business.

=== Amortization ===
Fully amortized.

=== Prepayment penalty ===
Decreasing over a three-year period, 5%-3%-1%, with no penalty in years 4+.

=== SBA Guaranty Fee ===
For FY2026:

== Process ==
The SBA 7(a) loan process is typically longer than that of conventional loans. The process differs depending on the size and complexity of the loan, but usually takes 60-90 days.

The SBA 7(a) loan process can be broken down into four phases and 16 steps:

=== Phase 1: Choosing a Lender ===
Step 1: Finding a lender

Step 2: Initial consultation with lender

=== Phase 2: Pre-Qualification ===
Step 3: Initial document request

Step 4: Initial document gathering and preparation

Step 5: Initial document submission

Step 6: Preliminary underwriting

Step 7: Prequalification

=== Phase 3: Underwriting and Approval ===
Step 8: Full underwriting

Step 9: Loan approval/commitment letter

=== Phase 4: Closing ===
Step 10: Deposits

Step 11: Third party reports

Step 12: Closing document request

Step 13: Closing document gathering and preparation

Step 14: Closing document submission

Step 15: Review and approval of closing documents

Step 16: Loan closing and disbursal

== Lenders ==
SBA 7(a) lenders include banks, credit unions, and non-bank lenders, including small business lending companies (SBLCs).

Banks and credit unions can earn Preferred Lender program (PLP) lender status, which allows them to handle the entire loan process themselves without extensive SBA review and approval. Without PLP status, a lender must send their loans through SBA general processing (GP), a longer and more cumbersome process.

In FY2024, 23,848 lenders completed at least 1 SBA 7(a) loan, and 393 completed at least 10 SBA 7(a) loans.

Top 25 SBA 7(a) Lenders, FY2024
National Rank	Lender	Number of Loans	Total Value of Loans
1	Newtek Small Business Finance	3,819	$2,098,740,400
2	Live Oak Banking	1,440	$1,983,953,500
3	Huntington National Bank	7,577	$1,530,064,700
4	Readycap Lending	3,571	$1,042,855,800
5	U.S. Bank	3,119	$708,227,200
6	JPMorgan Chase	2,553	$626,150,300
7	Bank of America	1,190	$609,574,600
8	First Internet Bank of Indiana	397	$580,272,200
9	TD Bank	3,996	$569,701,600
10	Wells Fargo	2,224	$567,031,300
11	BayFirst National Bank	3,187	$508,046,500
12	Byline Bank	410	$504,582,400
13	Celtic Bank	960	$499,440,300
14	GBank	179	$474,608,300
15	First Bank of the Lake	705	$389,591,300
16	Harvest Small Business Finance	331	$330,823,000
17	Cadence Bank	793	$293,718,200
18	Northeast Bank	2,552	$289,033,200
19	United Midwest Savings Bank	843	$279,922,300
20	Old National Bank	241	$262,459,100
21	Bank of Hope	283	$245,287,500
22	Berkshire Bank	189	$236,670,700
23	KeyBank	702	$226,749,400
24	M&T Bank	1,832	$207,807,100
25	Enterprise Bank & Trust	162	$205,674,200

== Documents ==
Lenders require many documents to complete an SBA 7(a) loan, and the gathering/preparation of such documents is the primary focus of the effort and time spent on the loan process by the borrower. Exactly what documents are required for a loan will differ based on the lender and details of the loan.

=== Personal ===
The following are personal documents that are typically required from each owner of over 20% of the business:

- 1040 personal tax returns
- Personal financial statement
- SBA Form 1919 (Borrower Information)
- Resume
- Signed Credit Authorization
- Driver's license/ID

=== Business ===
The following are documents that are typically required from the business:

- Tax returns (past three years)
- Profit and loss statements (past three years)
- Current (year-to-date) profit and loss statement
- Current (year-to-date) interim financial statement
- Current balance sheet
- Business entity documents
- Insurance policies
- Equipment list

=== Conditional ===
The following are documents that are typically required if applicable to the particular business/loan:

- Purchase and sale agreement
- Affiliate business financials
- Lease(s)
- Franchise agreement
- Additional collateral documents

== History ==
The SBA 7(a) program was established in 1953 along with the SBA itself.

SBA 7(a) Program Statistics
Fiscal Year	Loans Approved	Approval Amount ($)
1992	23,655	$5,880,429,292
1993	26,291	$6,690,995,672
1994	36,049	$8,142,444,017
1995	55,548	$8,251,957,812
1996	45,853	$7,694,062,736
1997	45,288	$9,461,352,612
1998	42,271	$9,016,559,155
1999	43,634	$10,146,109,913
2000	43,748	$10,523,436,538
2001	42,958	$9,894,022,393
2002	51,666	$12,208,026,875
2003	67,306	$11,268,200,031
2004	81,133	$13,571,560,391
2005	95,900	$15,223,525,886
2006	97,291	$14,525,100,339
2007	99,606	$14,292,141,213
2008	69,437	$12,671,235,790
2009	41,288	$9,191,044,339
2010	47,000	$12,406,048,700
2011	53,710	$19,640,298,400
2012	44,376	$15,153,504,000
2013	46,395	$17,865,672,500
2014	52,044	$19,190,547,800
2015	63,461	$23,583,863,400
2016	64,074	$24,128,426,343
2017	62,430	$25,447,458,500
2018	60,354	$25,372,539,100
2019	51,907	$23,175,811,000
2020	42,298	$22,549,825,700
2021	51,856	$36,536,756,800
2022	47,678	$25,693,805,700
2023	57,362	$27,515,666,000
2024	70,242	$31,124,036,200
