= Byline Bank =

Bank based in Chicago

Byline Bancorp, Inc.
- Type: Public company
- Traded as: NYSE: BY; Russell 2000 Index component
- Industry: Banking
- Founded: 1978; 48 years ago
- Headquarters: Chicago, Illinois, U.S.
- Number of locations: 57 branches (2019)
- Key people: Roberto Herencia, Chairman; Alberto Paracchini, CEO
- Revenue: ▲$216 million (2019)
- Net income: ▲$57 million (2019)
- Total assets: ▲$5.521 billion (2019)
- Total equity: ▲$750 million (2019)
- Number of employees: 1,001 (2019)
- Website: www.bylinebank.com

Byline Bank is a bank headquartered in Chicago, Illinois, United States. It is the primary subsidiary of Byline Bancorp, Inc., a bank holding company, and the fourth largest SBA 7(a) lender.

== History ==
The company was founded in 1978 by the Fasseas family as Metropolitan Bank Group, after the purchase of North Community Bank. The family grew the bank from a single location to more than 90 branches in the Chicago metropolitan area before suffering in the 2008 financial crisis.

In 2009, it accepted $71.5 million from the Troubled Asset Relief Program. In 2013, BXM Holdings LLC purchased and recapitalized the bank with a $207 million investment.

A year before acquiring Ridgestone Bank, the company was renamed Byline Bancorp Inc. and consolidated all its subsidiaries under the name Byline Bank in 2015.

In June 2017, the company became a public company via an initial public offering. In May 2018, the company acquired First Evanston Bancorp for $178.6 million in cash and stock.

In April 2019, the company acquired Oak Park River Forest Bank shares for $40.0 million in cash and stock. In December 2022, Byline entered a merger agreement and acquired Inland Bank, valued at approximately $165 million in cash and stock. The merger was finalized in July 2023.

On April 1, 2025, Byline merged with First Security Bank, closing at an approximate $41.5 million valuation. Under the agreement, every share of First Security’s common stock was converted into the right to receive 2.3539 shares of Byline common stock.

In October 2026, Byline merged with Illinois State Bancorp, parent company of First Nations Bank and Bank of Bourbonnais, in a cash and stock transaction valued at approximately $87.9 million.
