= Emerson Bromo-Seltzer Tower =

Clocktower-office building in Baltimore, Maryland

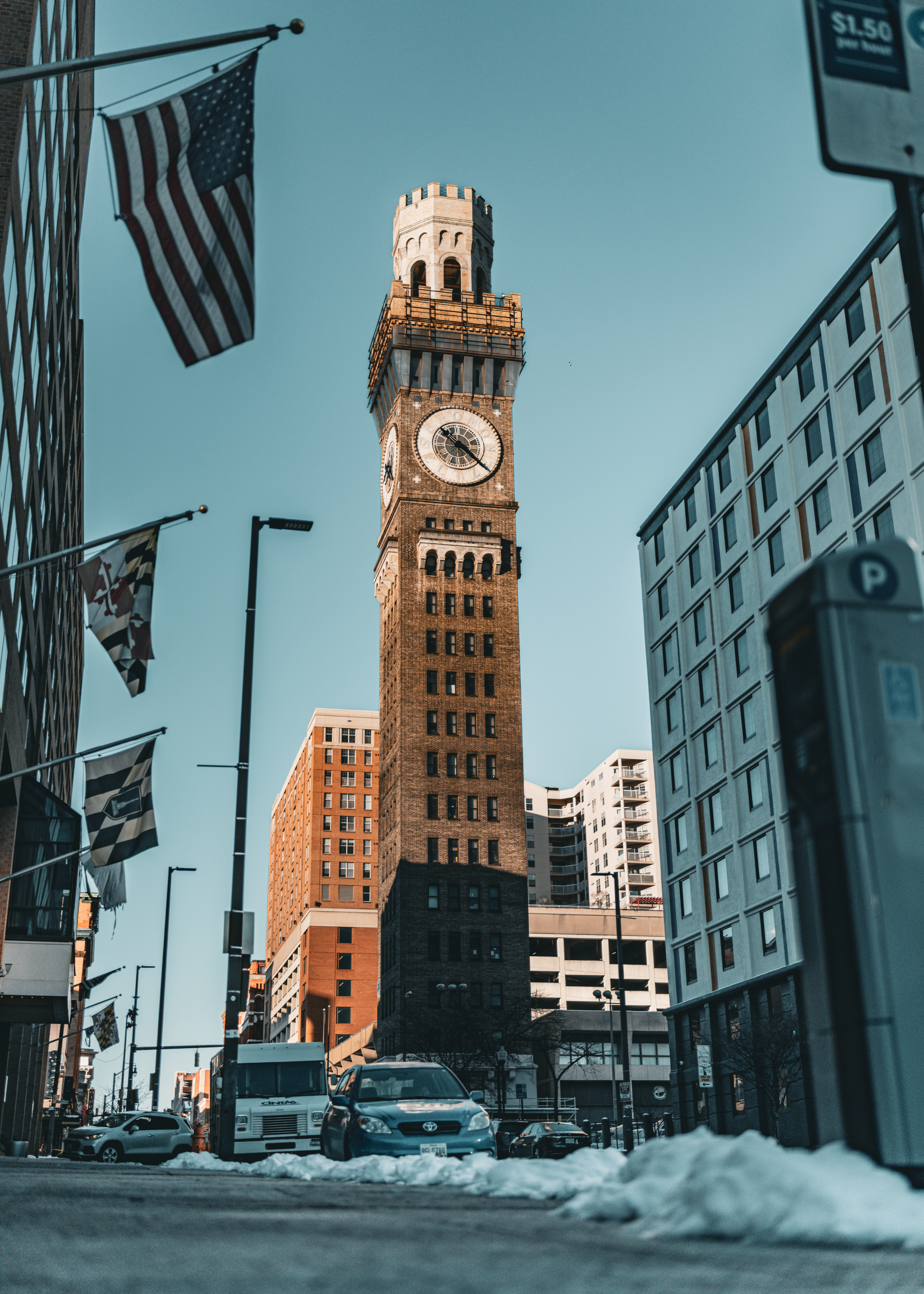
- Interactive map of the Emerson Bromo-Seltzer Tower area
- Alternative names: Bromo-Seltzer Arts Tower

General information
- Type: Commercial offices
- Architectural style: Renaissance Revival
- Location: 21 South Eutaw St., Baltimore, Maryland
- Coordinates: 39°17′15.7″N 76°37′14.3″W
- Construction started: 1907
- Construction stopped: 1911
- Owner: City of Baltimore
- Management: Baltimore Office of Promotion & The Arts

Height
- Roof: 88 m (289 ft)

Technical details
- Floor count: 15
- Grounds: 0.1 acres (0.040 ha)

Design and construction
- Architect: Joseph Evans Sperry

Website
- www.bromoseltzertower.com

U.S. National Register of Historic Places
- Designated: June 4, 1973
- Reference no.: 73002184

Baltimore City Landmark
- Designated: 1975

The Emerson Tower (often called the Bromo-Seltzer Tower or the Bromo Tower) is a 15-story, 88 m (289 ft) clock tower in downtown Baltimore, Maryland. Erected in 1907–1911 at 21 South Eutaw Street, at the northeast corner of Eutaw and West Lombard Streets, it was the tallest building in the city from 1911 to 1923, when it was supplanted by the Citizens National Bank building. It was designed by local architect Joseph Evans Sperry (1854–1930) for Isaac Edward Emerson (1859–1931), who invented the Bromo-Seltzer headache remedy.

For years, the landmark tower was surrounded by and part of the Emerson Drug Company with its office headquarters and manufacturing plant for the carbonated headache pain relief tablets or powder Bromo-Seltzer. Later, the Emerson building around it was razed and replaced by the Baltimore City Fire Department's John Steadman Fire Station, which serves the west side of downtown Baltimore. The Steadman Station combined several earlier engine and truck companies in firehouses on the west side. Built in the Brutalist architecture style of poured concrete, the station has lines echoing the surviving tower to its south and west.

== History ==
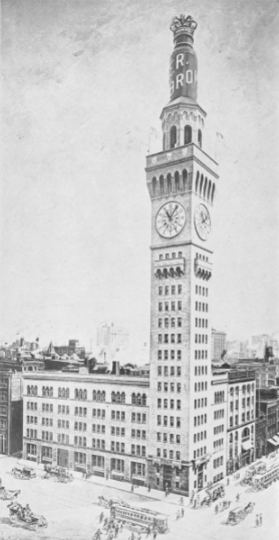
C. 1920

It was the tallest building in Baltimore from 1911 until 1923. The design of the tower along with the original factory building at its base was inspired by the Palazzo Vecchio in Florence, Italy, which was seen by Emerson during a tour of Europe in 1900. Systems engineering for the building's original design was completed by Henry Adams. The factory was demolished in 1969 and replaced with a firehouse.

The building features four clock faces adorning the tower's 15th floor on the North, South, East and West sides. Installed by the Seth Thomas Clock Company at an original cost of US$3,965, they are made of translucent white glass and feature the letters B-R-O-M-O S-E-L-T-Z-E-R, with the Roman numerals being less prominent. The dials, which are illuminated at night with LED lights are 24 feet (7.3 meters) in diameter, and the minute and hour hands about 12 and 10 feet (3.7 and 3.0 meters) in length respectively. Upon its completion, the Bromo Seltzer Tower had the world's largest four-dial gravity-driven clock. The clock was converted to electric power in 1975 and restored to the original weight drive in 2017. On each clock face, BROMO runs clockwise from 10:00 to 2:00, while SELTZER runs counterclockwise from 9:00 to 3:00.

The tower originally had a 51 ft (16 m) Bromo-Seltzer bottle, glowing blue and rotating. Weighing 20 tons (18.1 tonnes), it was lined with 314 illuminated lights and topped with a crown. On a clear night it could be seen from 20 miles away. The bottle was removed in 1936 because of structural concerns.

The tower was virtually abandoned in 2002, but in early 2007 the Baltimore Office of Promotion and the Arts and philanthropists Eddie and Sylvia Brown worked to transform the structure into artist studios. The Bromo Seltzer Arts Tower is now home to a variety of creative artists, writers, videographers, photographers, poets, and more. Throughout the day, artists welcome guests into their studios to view and purchase original art. The Baltimore Fire Department's John F. Steadman Memorial Station, which opened in 1973 and is situated at the tower's base, houses BCFD Hazmat 1, Airflex 1, Medic1, Medic 23, MAC23, Engine 23, Rescue 1, and formerly Truck 2.

The Bromo Seltzer History Museum opened in 2015 featuring a collection of Bromo Seltzer bottles and Emerson Drug Company marketing ephemera. The Maryland Glass Room was added in 2017 to showcase the collection of cobalt blue glass bottles made by The Maryland Glass Corporation owned by Isaac Emerson.

The Emerson Bromo-Seltzer Tower was placed on the National Register of Historic Places in 1973. It is included within the Baltimore National Heritage Area.

== See also ==
- List of tallest buildings in Baltimore
- List of towers
