= Arcadia Plantation =

Historic house in South Carolina, United States

- U.S. National Register of Historic Places
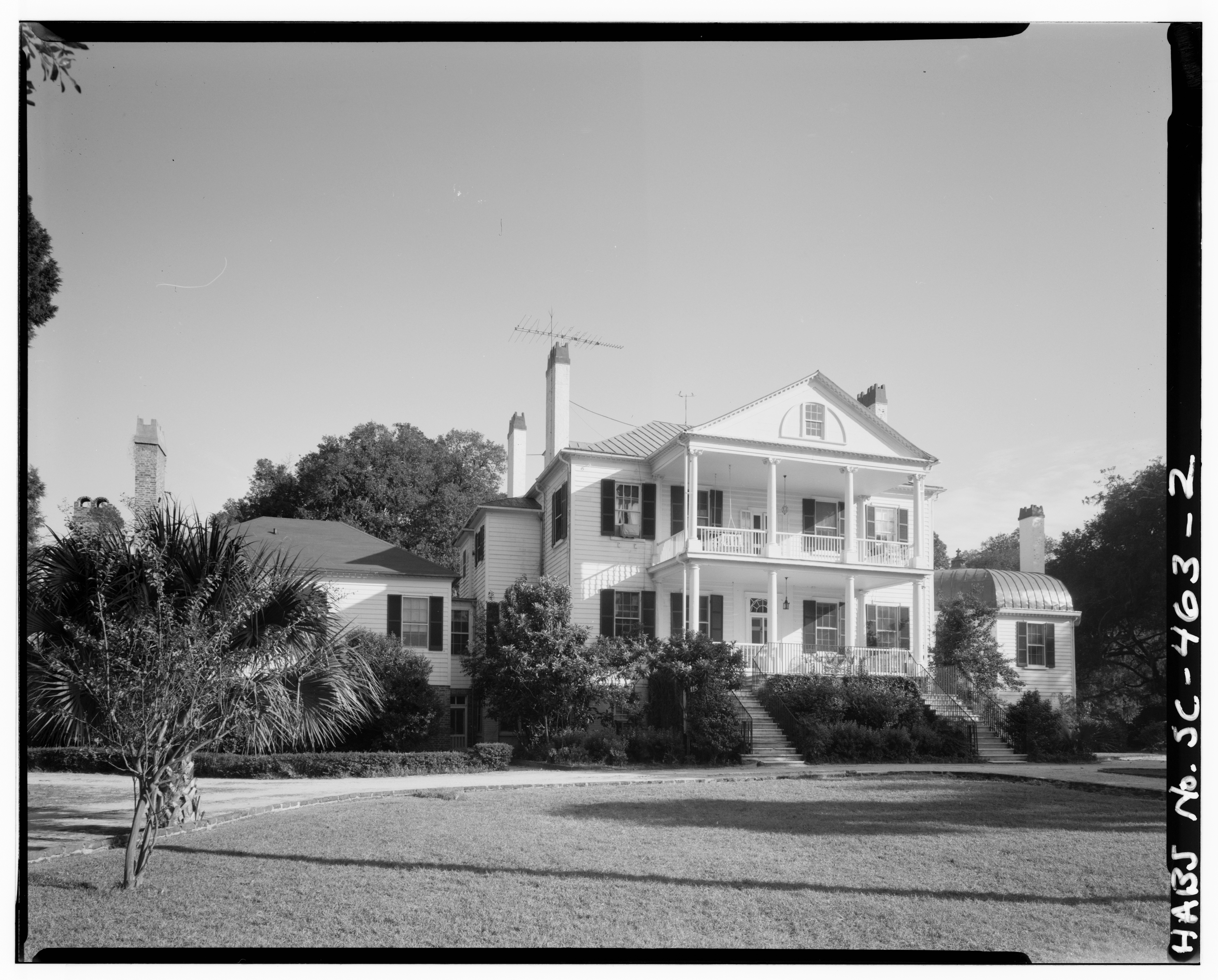
- Front facade of Arcadia Plantation.

- Location within South Carolina Location within the United States
- Location: 5 miles (8 km) east of Georgetown off U.S. Route 17, near Georgetown, South Carolina
- Coordinates: 33°23′01″N 79°13′25″W
- Area: 90 acres (36 ha)
- Built: 1794
- Architectural style: Georgian
- NRHP reference No.: 78002509
- Added to NRHP: January 3, 1978

Arcadia Plantation, originally known as Prospect Hill Plantation, is a historic plantation house located near Georgetown, Georgetown County, South Carolina. The main portion of the house was built about 1794, as a two-story clapboard structure set upon a raised brick basement in the late-Georgian style. In 1906 Captain Isaac Edward Emerson, the "Bromo-Seltzer King" from Baltimore, purchased the property. Two flanking wings were added in the early 20th century. A series of terraced gardens extend from the front of the house toward the Waccamaw River. Also on the property is a large two-story guest house (c. 1910), tennis courts, a bowling alley, stables, five tenant houses and a frame church. The property also contains two cemeteries and other plantation-related outbuildings.

It was listed on the National Register of Historic Places in 1978.
