= Isaac Edward Emerson =

American businessman, socialite and seaman

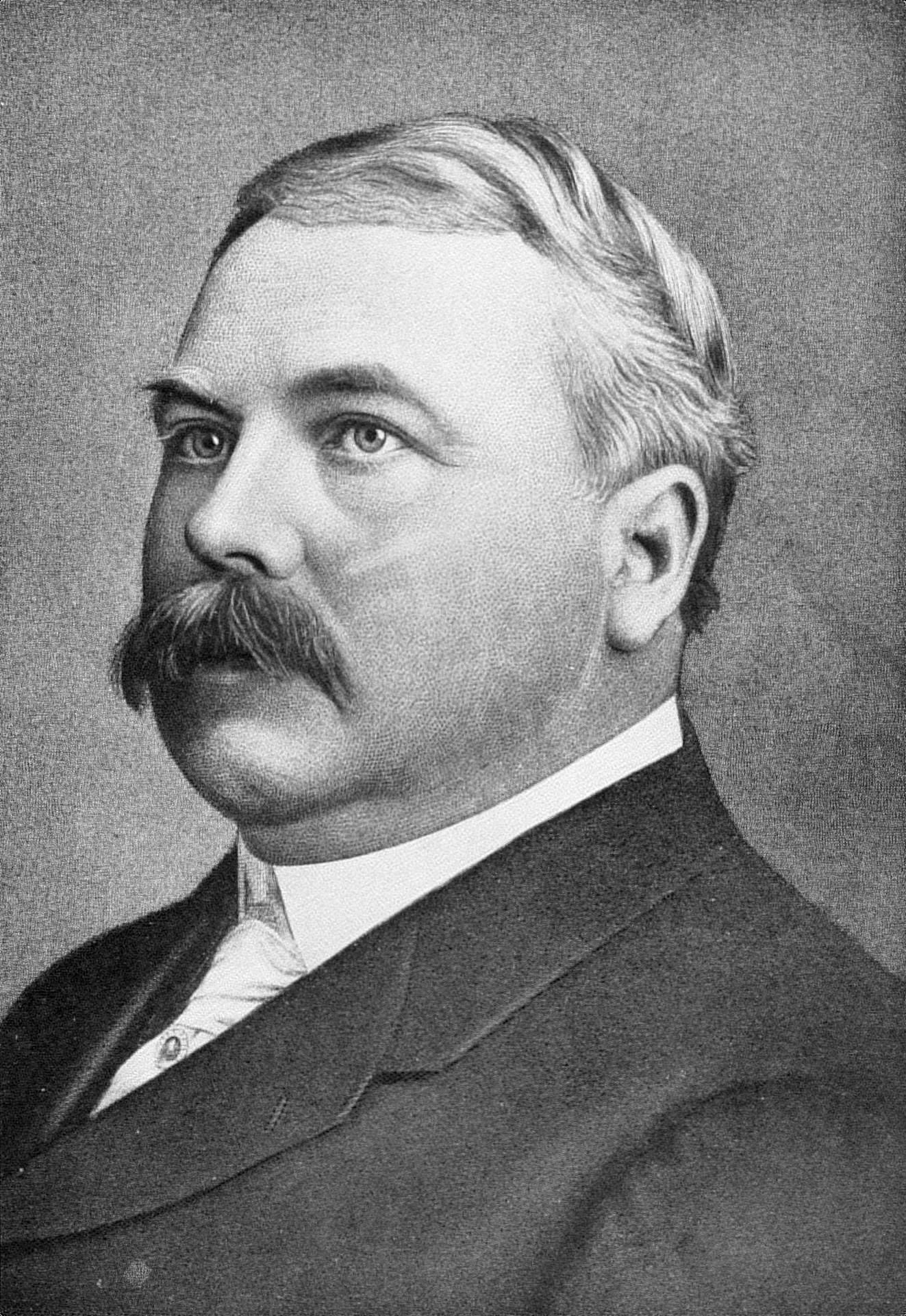
- Born: July 24, 1859; Chatham County, North Carolina
- Died: January 23, 1931 (aged 71); Baltimore, Maryland
- Education: University of North Carolina
- Known for: Creating Bromo-Seltzer
- Spouses: Emelie Askew Dunn (m. 1880; div. 1911) Anne Preston McCormack (m. 1911–1931)
- Children: Margaret Emerson
- Relatives: Alfred Gwynne Vanderbilt Jr. (grandson); George Washington Vanderbilt III (grandson); Gloria Baker (granddaughter)

Captain Isaac Edward Emerson (1859–1931) was a wealthy American businessman, socialite, and seaman. He is most notable for having created the headache remedy Bromo-Seltzer upon which his great wealth was based and the reason he was known as the "Bromo-Seltzer King".

== Early life ==
Issac Edward Emerson was born in 1859 in Chatham County, North Carolina, the son of a farmer. When his mother died prematurely, he went to live with his aunt and uncle. He later graduated as a pharmacist from the University of North Carolina in 1879.

== Career ==
In 1880, he moved to Baltimore and opened a small drug store where he developed a formula for a headache remedy. He patented the formula, named it Bromo-Seltzer and began marketing it. In 1887, he formed the Emerson Drug Company and, recognizing the importance of advertising in selling products, undertook worldwide ad campaigns in newspaper, magazine, in-store ads and on radio which rocketed the sales of Bromo-Seltzer and other products producing his great wealth.

In 1911, Emerson built the Emerson Bromo-Seltzer Tower, on the northeast corner of West Lombard and South Eutaw Streets, in the southwest downtown area, a well-known landmark in Baltimore, Maryland for 116 years. The tower originally featured a 51-foot revolving blue steel Bromo-Seltzer bottle on top that was lit by electric lights and visible for miles. The Emerson Tower was the tallest building in Baltimore along with another clock tower skyscraper on the downtown east side of the Maryland Casualty Company's – The Tower Building at the northwest corner of East Baltimore and Holiday Streets, until 1923, when supplanted by the Citizens National Bank Building (later First National Bank of Maryland) at the southwest corner of Light and Redwood Streets. He also built the Emerson Hotel at the northwest corner of North Calvert and East Baltimore Streets, replacing the former old Baltimore and Ohio Railroad Central Headquarters of 1884, which burned in the Great Baltimore Fire of February 1904. The hotel was unfortunately razed in 1971. He was controlling owner of the Maryland Glass Corporation, which made the blue glass bottles for his Bromo-Seltzer medication.

=== Captain Ike ===
In 1884, he earned the title of "captain" when he organized the Maryland Naval Reserves, which he commanded until 1901. He was thereafter known as "Captain Emerson" or "Captain Ike." He also personally financed an entire Naval Squadron during the Spanish–American War and was commissioned a Lieutenant in the United States Navy. Emerson later owned several yachts, including the Susquehanna, the Margaret, and the Queen Anne. These were used for extensive world travel as well as for social entertaining and hunting expeditions.

== Personal life ==
Plaque of Emerson

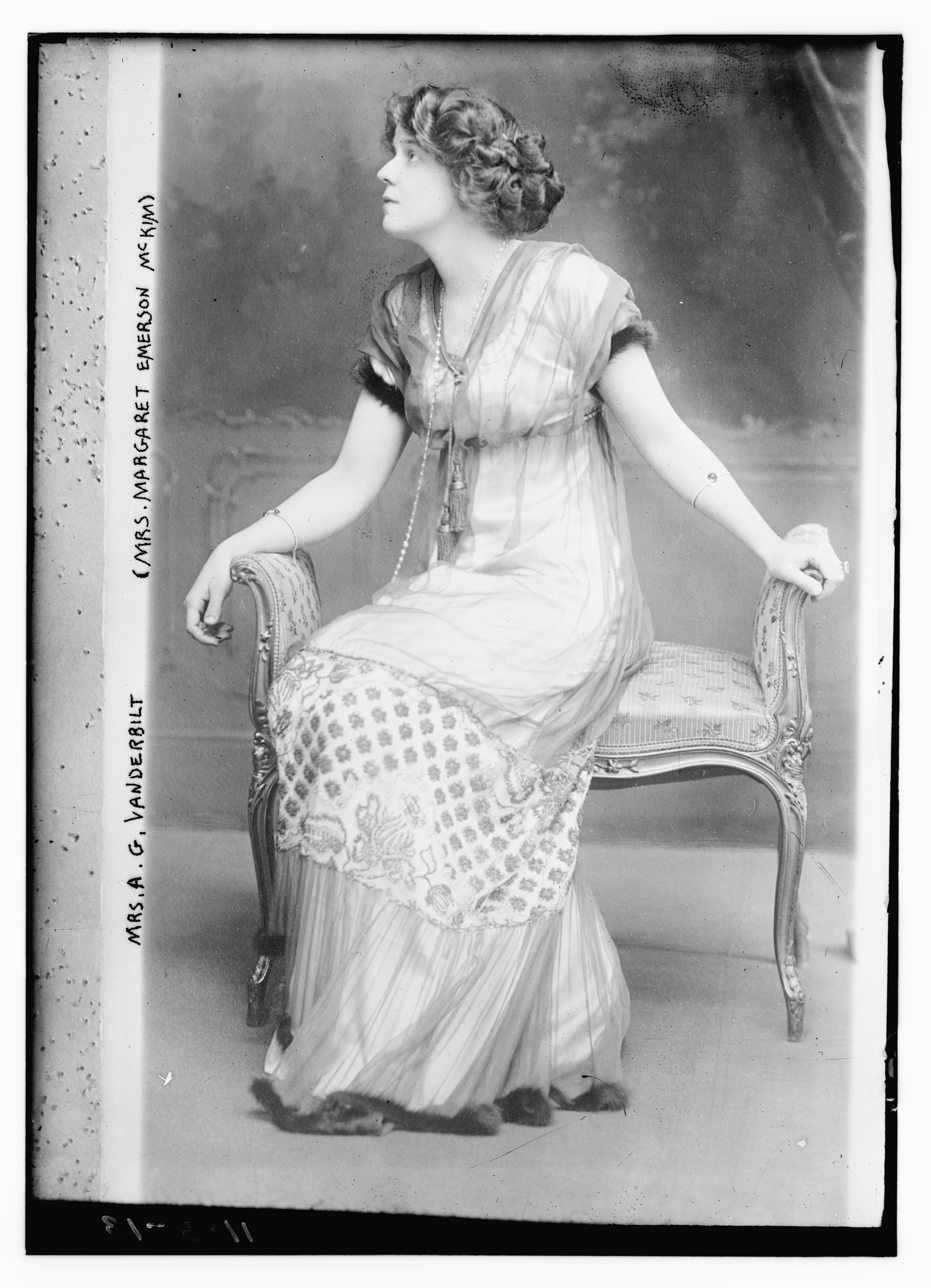
Photograph of his daughter, Margaret, in the Library of Congress.

In 1880, just after graduating college, he married Emelie (née Askew) Dunn (1854–1921), the eldest daughter of Harriet J. (née Moore) Askew and Colonel William Franklin Askew of Raleigh, North Carolina. From her first marriage to John K. Dunn, Emelie was the mother of Margaret "Daisy" Dunn (1875–1944), whom Emerson adopted. Daisy was married to J. Mitchell Horner and, later, James McVickar. Before their divorce in 1911, they were the parents of one child:

- Margaret Emerson (1884–1960), who married Dr. Smith Hollins McKim in 1902. They divorced in 1910 and in 1911 she married Alfred Gwynne Vanderbilt. She was widowed in 1915 when he died aboard the RMS Lusitania. In 1918, she married Raymond T. Baker, divorcing in 1928. Her last marriage was to Charles Minot Amory in 1928.

After their divorce, Emelie married Charles Hazeltine Basshor in August 1912. Basshor later committed suicide in 1914, and Emelie Basshor died in 1921.

In 1911, he married his second wife, Anne McCormack (née Preston). From this marriage, he gained a stepson and a stepdaughter:

- Frederick C. McCormack
- Ethel Preston McCormack, who married Francis Huger McAdoo, the eldest son of United States Treasury Secretary and U.S. Senator, William Gibbs McAdoo. She later married Walter Winchester Keith and Matthew James Looram.

Captain Emerson and his wife, Anne, were widely known in American society and in the capitals of Europe. When Emerson's step-daughter, Ethel P. McCormack, married the son of William Gibbs McAdoo, then U.S. Secretary of the Treasury, President Woodrow Wilson attended the reception at the Emerson estate in Brooklandwood, Maryland, off of Falls Road, north of the city. They were also known as lavish entertainers, maintaining two yachts for parties and world tours. They maintained estates at Brooklandwood and their villa Whitehall at Narragansett Pier in Rhode Island as well as in North and South Carolina where they entertained many social leaders of the Atlantic seaboard cities.

=== Estate ===
Emerson died in 1931. His Will was filed for Probate in the New York Surrogate's Court on 30 January 1931; at the time of his death the size of his estate was speculated to be $20 million. The actual size of the estate was revealed in 1932, when newspaper reports of accounts submitted to the Records of Wills Office in Baltimore County by Emerson's trustees confirmed that Emerson's estate was valued at $12,767,327. The estate assessed for $320,661.54 in Federal Estate Taxes and $1,193,618.72 in Maryland Estate Taxes.

The bulk of the estate consisted of controlling interests in four companies: Emerson's Bromo-Seltzer, the Emerson Drug Company, the Maryland Glass Corporation and the Emerson Hotel. His stock in these companies was place in a 20-year trust fund, the income of which would be paid to his beneficiaries in the following proportions:

- 35.5% to his widowed second wife Anne Preston Emerson
- 35.5% to his only daughter Margaret Emerson
  - 6% to his Margaret's daughter Gloria Baker
  - 2% each to Margaret's sons Alfred Gwynne Vanderbilt Jr. and George Washington Vanderbilt III
- 1% to his step-daughter Ethel McCormack Keith
  - 1% each to Ethel's children Patricia Keith, Francis H. McAdoo, Anne McAdoo, and Sally McAdoo
- 2% each to his step-daughter Lillie White, and 1% to her daughter Margaret Schneck
- 1% to his step-son Frederick McCormack Jr. and 2% to Frederick's wife Virginia "Ritchie" Harrison McCormack
- 1% to his brother John W. Emerson

At the end of the 20-year Trust period the trust assets were to be divided amongst the beneficiaries and their children in the same proportions. If any of his beneficiaries died before the expiry of the 20-year Trust period, each beneficiary's share was to be paid to their children in equal shares. Consequently, when Emerson's second wife died in 1944, her two children from her first marriage, Ethel McCormack Looram and Frederick C. McCormack Jr each inherited a 17.75% interest in the Trust fund established under their stepfather's will. Emerson's stepson Frederick C. McCormack Jr died in 1948; litigation over the dispersal of his share of the Emerson Trust revealed that its value was approximately $5,600,000 in 1948, and later approximately $6,000,000 when the Trust vested in 1951.

Emerson bequeathed his real estate in the Worthington Valley to his daughter Margaret for life, and thereafter to her son Alfred, and his Southern shooting preserve Arcadia to his grandson George.

=== Descendants ===
In 1902, his daughter Margaret, aged 18, married Dr. Smith Hollins McKim. They became social leaders in New York's high society. But in 1910 she brought a sensational divorce suit against her husband, claiming he beat her in drunken rages. She remarried in 1911, this time to Alfred Gwynne Vanderbilt, one of the wealthiest men in America having inherited the bulk of his father's fortune in 1899. They had two sons, Alfred Gwynne Jr. and George Washington III. While traveling to England on business, Alfred Sr. heroically lost his life in the sinking of RMS Lusitania, a famous British passenger ocean liner by German torpedo in 1915 during World War I. Margaret inherited part of her husband's fortune. One son from this marriage, Alfred Jr., went on to become one of the driving forces behind thoroughbred racing in America. Margaret married two more times, both ending in divorce. In 1931, she legally resumed her maiden name.

Emerson's stepdaughter, Ethel P. McCormack, married successful New York lawyer, Francis Huger McAdoo in 1913 at the time his father was the Secretary of the Treasury of the United States. After Ethel and Francis divorced, Ethel took up her residence in the Brooklandwood estate.
