= Pan American Bank =

- Type: Private corporation
- Industry: Financial services
- Founded: 1995; 31 years ago
- Headquarters: Melrose Park, Illinois, United States
- Area served: Illinois
- Key people: Nicholas S. Giuliano (Chairman), Frank C. Cerrone (CEO)
- Products: Banking services
- Website: panamerbank.com

Pan American Bank & Trust is a U.S. privately held community bank based in Melrose Park, Illinois.

The bank is insured by the Federal Deposit Insurance Corporation and as of June 30, 2026, it had $536 million in assets and $475 million in deposits. The bank is wholly owned by American Bancorp of Illinois, Inc., a bank holding company duly registered with the Federal Reserve System. It has six offices in and around Chicago, IL: Melrose Park, Bellwood, Bloomingdale, Palatine, Little Village and Sauganash in Chicago.

The bank is a full service community bank offering deposit and loan services to the communities it serves. According to the FDIC, in CRA Evaluations released on January 1, 2013, and March 1, 2007, the bank has done an “outstanding” job of meeting the credit needs of its communities, a recognition received by less than 7% of the nation's banks in 2014. The evaluation by the FDIC was based on the bank's record of lending to small businesses and providing home mortgages and took into consideration the bank's record of lending in low and moderate income areas and loans to persons of low and moderate income.

== History ==
Pan American Bank & Trust was established in 1995 and was acquired by American Bancorp. of Illinois, Inc. in 2007.

Pan American Bank & Trust has been designated as a Community Development Financial Institution (“CDFI”). This designation means that Pan American Bank & Trust has been recognized by the Community Development Financial Institution Fund, administered through the U.S. Department of Treasury, as being committed to the goals of economic development, affordable housing, and community development financial services. In recognition of its commitment to these goals, Pan American Bank & Trust has received an award from the CDFI Fund in the years 2008 through 2014.

=== Growth ===
Between June 2007 and June 2014, the bank's total assets increased from $33 million to $241 million. In 2007, the bank held $229,000 in deposits from states and political subdivisions, but as of June 30, 2014 it held $49 million, or 20% of total deposits.

Pan American Bank & Trust acquired the $49 million Bank of Palatine in September 2014.

Pan American Bank & Trust was selected by the nationally renowned industry publication, American Banker, as one of the Best Banks To Work For in 2018 nationwide.

== Leadership ==
Chairman, Nicholas S. Giuliano, formerly of The PrivateBank, and President and CEO, Frank C. Cerrone, formerly of the International Bank of Chicago, lead Pan American Bank & Trust.

== Politics ==
Pan American Bank & Trust has contributed $124,178 to 50 Illinois politicians or political committees from 2008 through 2014. Recipients include the Mexican American PAC, the West Central Municipal Conference, the Italian-American Political Coalition, the Bellwood First Party, the Independent Citizens Action Party of Franklin Park, and the Illinois Bankers Association PAC.

In September 2010, Democratic State Treasurer candidate Robin Kelly accused her opponent, then-Republican state Sen. Dan Rutherford, of violating state law by receiving a campaign contribution from Pan American Bank & Trust worth $500 while Pan American bid on a contract worth more than the law's $50,000 cap. Rutherford later returned contributions from Pan American Bank & Trust.
