= Bromo-Seltzer =

Antacid and analgesic drug

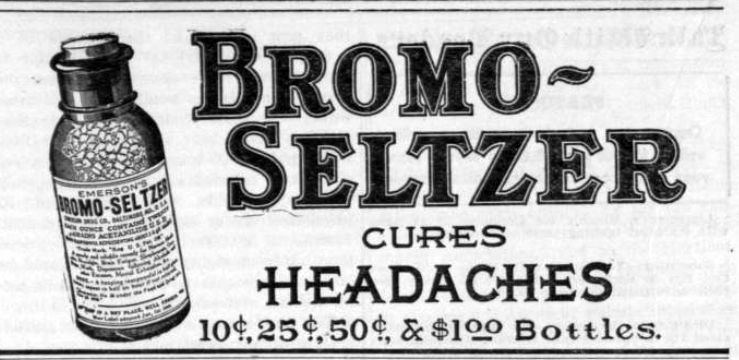
Bromo-Seltzer newspaper ad (1908)

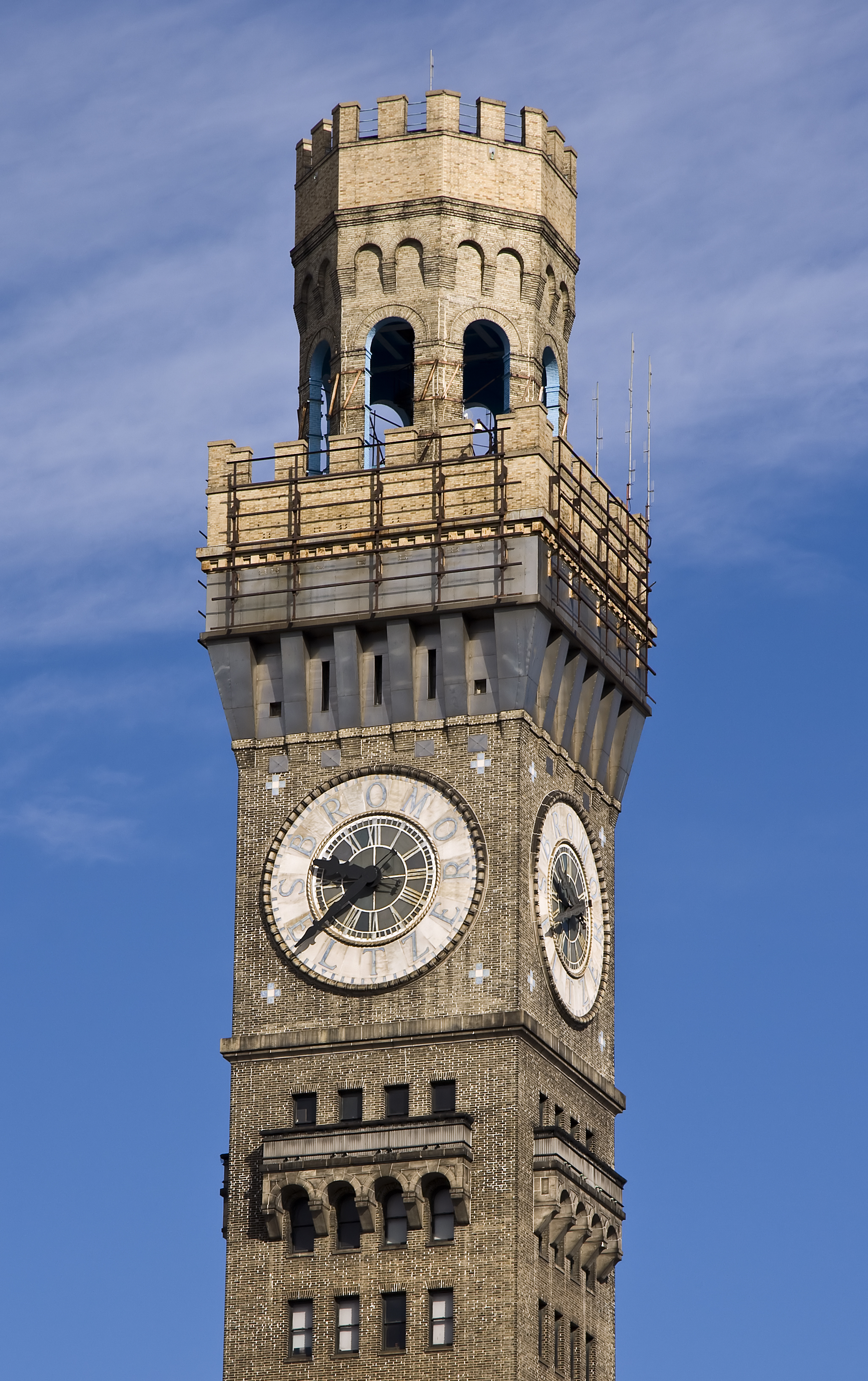
Emerson Drug Company's Bromo-Seltzer Tower headquarters in Baltimore

A horse-drawn Bromo-Seltzer wagon

Bromo-Seltzer is a brand of antacid formulated to relieve pain occurring together with heartburn, upset stomach, or acid indigestion. It originally contained sodium bromide and acetanilide, both toxic substances which were eventually removed. Its current formulation contains the pain reliever aspirin and two reactive chemicals – sodium bicarbonate and citric acid – which creates effervescence when mixed with water. Sodium bicarbonate is an antacid.

== History ==
Bromo-Seltzer was invented in 1888 by Isaac E. Emerson and produced by the Emerson Drug Company of Baltimore, Maryland. It was sold in the United States in the form of effervescent granules that were mixed with water before ingestion. The product took its name from a component of the original formula, sodium bromide; each dose contained 3.2 mEq/teaspoon of it. Bromides are a class of tranquilizers that were withdrawn from the U.S. market in 1975 due to their toxicity. Their sedative effect probably accounted for Bromo-Seltzer's popularity as a hangover remedy. Early formulas also used acetanilide as the analgesic ingredient; it is now known to be toxic. Acetanilide was replaced with its metabolite acetaminophen, and its current formulation uses aspirin, sodium bicarbonate, and citric acid, the latter two of which provide the carbonation.

Bromo-Seltzer's main offices and factory were located in downtown Baltimore, Maryland, at the corner of West Lombard and South Eutaw streets. The factory's most notable feature was the Emerson Bromo-Seltzer Tower, built in 1911, whose four clock faces are ringed by letters spelling out the product name. The tower was patterned on the Palazzo Vecchio in Florence, Italy, and is listed on the National Register of Historic Places. The tower originally held a 51-foot (16m) representation of a Bromo-Seltzer bottle at its top, glowing blue and rotating on a vertical axis. The sign weighed 20 tons (18.1 tonnes), included 314 incandescent light bulbs, and was topped with a crown. The sign was removed in 1936 because of structural concerns.

Emerson, who traveled widely, said the fizz reminded him of the bubbling action of Mount Bromo, a volcano in Java.

== In popular culture ==
Bromo-Seltzer is mentioned in several films and TV shows, including Three Wise Girls (1932) The Crooked Circle (1932), Bed of Roses (1933), Topper (1937), Wonder Man (1945), Somewhere in the Night (1946), The Jackpot (1950), The Postman Always Rings Twice (1981), The Hudsucker Proxy (1994), the 1998 The Simpsons episode "Bart Carny", Golden Girls (Season 4, Episode 1 and Season 2, Episode 12) and Law & Order (Season 8, Episode 10).

It is mentioned in John Steinbeck's 1939 novel The Grapes of Wrath. It is also mentioned in Leonard Gardner’s 1969 novel Fat City.

Drugstore Bromo-Seltzer dispensers are mentioned in Georges Simenon's 1949 detective novel Maigret chez le coroner that takes place in Arizona.

It was a sponsor of the old time radio program, “The Inner Sanctum”.

It is mentioned in several songs, including "Bewitched, Bothered and Bewildered" by Rodgers and Hart, "Adelaide's Lament" in the musical Guys and Dolls, and "Pachuco Cadaver" by Captain Beefheart and his Magic Band. In Spike Jones' version of Laura, the chorus chants "Bromo-Seltzer, Bromo-Seltzer..." to evoke the sound of a chugging train. This was based on a sound effect used at that time in Bromo-Seltzer's radio commercials, produced by the use of Sonovox.
