= HMY Conqueror II =

British armed yacht sunk by torpedo in 1916

History
- Name: 1888: Lady Aline (intended); 1889: Conqueror; 1915: Conqueror II
- Owner: 1889: Walter S Bailey; 1891: Frederick W Vanderbilt; 1911: William Montagu
- Operator: 1903: Robert J. Collier; 1915: (United Kingdom) Royal Navy
- Port of registry: 1889: (United Kingdom) Hull; 1891: (United States) New York; 1912: (United Kingdom) London
- Builder: Russell & Co, Port Glasgow
- Yard number: 194
- Launched: 20 February 1889
- Identification: UK official number 95786; 1889: code letters LCWM; 1914: code letters JDKF; 1914: call sign GID; 1915: pennant number 051
- Fate: Sunk by torpedo, 1916

General characteristics
- Type: steam yacht
- Tonnage: 386 GRT, 175 NRT
- Length: 188.05 ft (57.32 m) overall; 177.0 ft (53.9 m) p/p
- Beam: 24.6 ft (7.5 m)
- Depth: 13.5 ft (4.1 m)
- Decks: 2
- Installed power: 92 NHP
- Propulsion: 1 × triple-expansion engine; 1 × screw
- Complement: 1916: 34
- Crew: 1893: 34
- Armament: 1915: 2 × 6-pounder guns

HMY Conqueror II was an iron-hulled steam yacht that was launched in Scotland in 1889 as Conqueror. She belonged to Frederick William Vanderbilt from 1891, and then to William Montagu, 9th Duke of Manchester from 1911. In the First World War the Admiralty requisitioned her as an armed yacht. In 1915, she was commissioned into the Royal Navy as HMY Conqueror II. The "II" was added to avoid confusion with the dreadnought battleship HMS Conqueror. A German U-boat sank the yacht in 1916, killing 17 of her crew.

== Building and registration ==
Russell & Co of Port Glasgow built the yacht as yard number 194, and launched her on 20 February 1889. Her lengths were 188.05 ft (57.32 m) overall and 177.0 ft (53.9 m) between perpendiculars. Her beam was 24.6 ft (7.5 m) and her depth was 13.5 ft (4.1 m). Her tonnages were 386 GRT and 175 NRT. She had a single screw, driven by a three-cylinder triple-expansion engine that was built by William King & Co of Glasgow, and rated at 92 NHP. She carried a lifeboat big enough to accommodate the entire crew, and also carried a steam launch and a "naphtha launch" (i.e. motorboat).

Russell's built the yacht for William B Walker of Chislehurst in Kent, as a replacement for his previous yacht, Lady Aline, which the Admiralty had acquired from him in 1888. Walker intended to give his new yacht the same name, but he died in January 1889, shortly before she was launched.

A Walter S Bailey of Kingston upon Hull bought the yacht, named her Conqueror, and registered her in Hull. Her UK official number was 95786, and her code letters were LCWM.

== Import duty court case ==
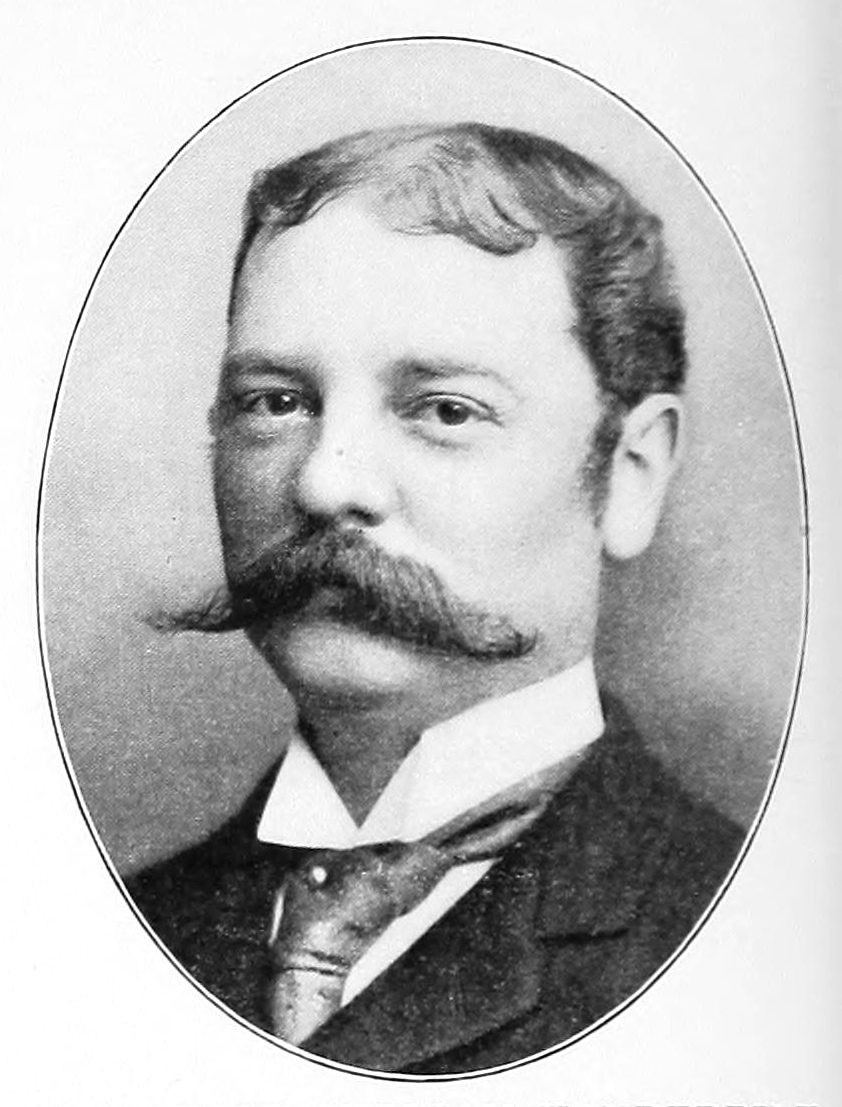
Frederick W Vanderbilt in the 1890s

In May 1891, FW Vanderbilt bought the yacht for £15,500, or about $75,000. That June he had her brought to New York via Halifax, Nova Scotia. He registered her in New York.

By 22 August 1891, a solicitor for the United States Department of the Treasury ruled that because she was an imported "manufacture of iron", the United States Customs Service should subject her to duty at 45 percent. On 27 August the revenue cutter W. E. Chandler took a USCS officer to Stapleton, Staten Island, where he boarded and seized Conqueror in lieu of $30,500 duty. That same day, Vanderbilt filed a libel in the United States District Court for the Southern District of New York. Technically the lawsuit was against Conqueror, but in effect it was against the Collector of the Port of New York, Jacob Sloat Fassett.

On 19 October 1891, the Supreme Court of the United States granted William Howard Taft, Solicitor General of the United States, leave to file a petition for a writ to prohibit the Judge of the District Court from hearing Vanderbilt's libel. On 15 December the Supreme Court heard the application, with Taft representing the Federal Government, and Elihu Root representing Vanderbilt. On 11 January 1892 the Supreme Court found against Taft, which left the District Court free to hear Vanderbilt's libel. By 28 January the District Court had heard the case, and Judge Addison Brown had found in Vanderbilt's favour. Almost five years later, on 3 January 1897, the Supreme Court upheld the District Court's decision, and awarded Vanderbilt $21,742 in compensation.

== Conqueror ==
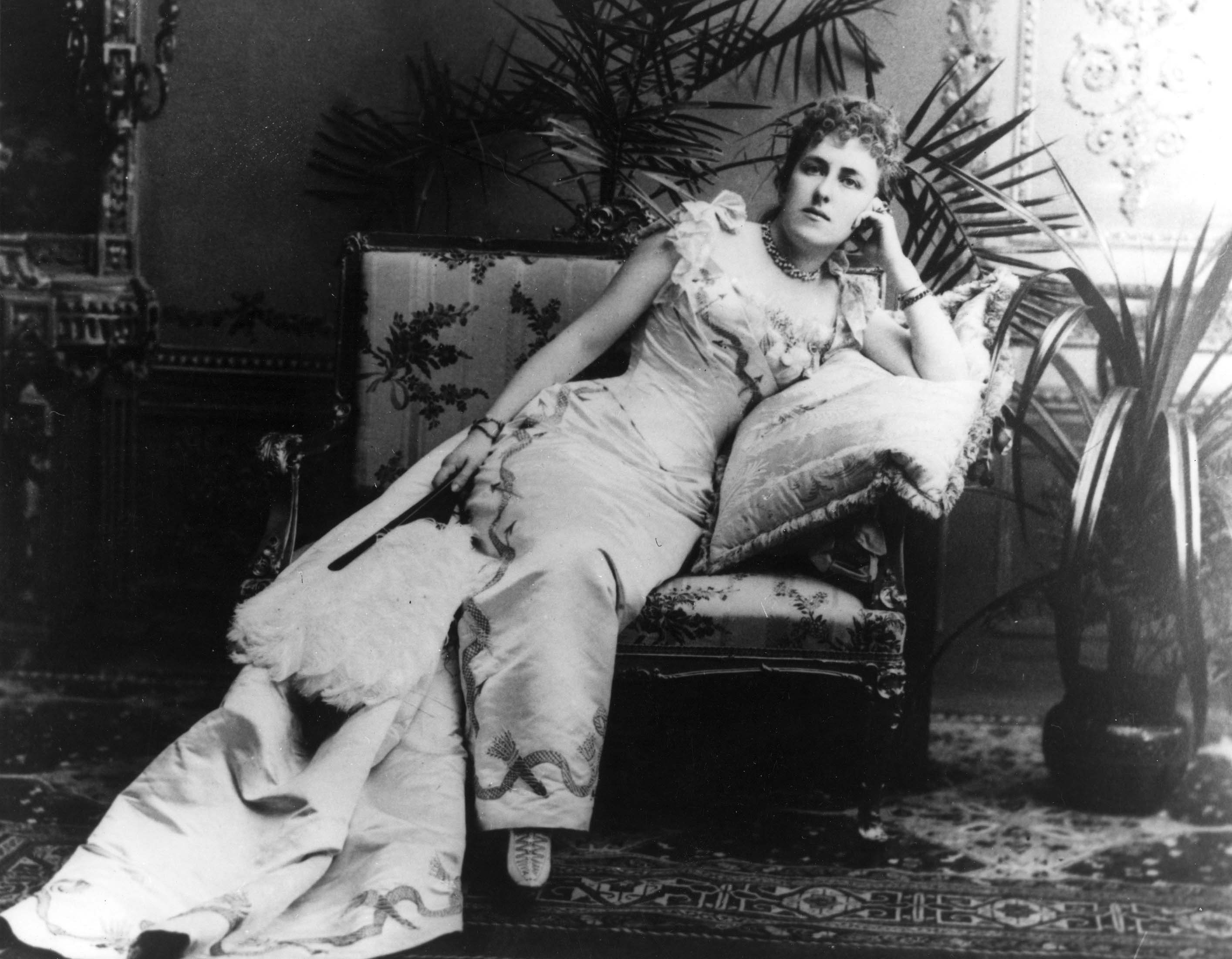
Mrs FW Vanderbilt

The yacht included two cabins for Mr. and Mrs. Vanderbilt; three guest cabins; a "grand saloon"; a "deck saloon"; and a "grand staircase". A writing and smoking room was in a separate superstructure aft. The accommodation had electric lighting, and in the forward part of the yacht was an ice chest big enough to supply ice for two months. At the foot of the grand staircase was a closet for silver, and an arsenal of rifles and revolvers. The yacht carried a crew of 34.

On 28 January 1893, Conqueror left the Erie Dry Dock, Brooklyn, to begin a cruise from New York to the West Indies. Only the crew was aboard, as FW and Mrs Vanderbilt and their guests planned to travel in his private railroad car Mariquita to Brunswick, Georgia, where they were to board the yacht. Guests included Mr. and Mrs. Thomas H. Howard. The plan was to cruise to the Florida Keys, Nassau, Havana, and Port of Spain. The Vanderbilts planned to return to New York in mid-March.

Mr. and Mrs. Vanderbilt used Conqueror to entertain guests at Newport, Rhode Island, and to watch New York Yacht Club races. In March 1896, FW Vanderbilt ordered a new "naphtha launch" to carry aboard Conqueror as a replacement for her steam tender.

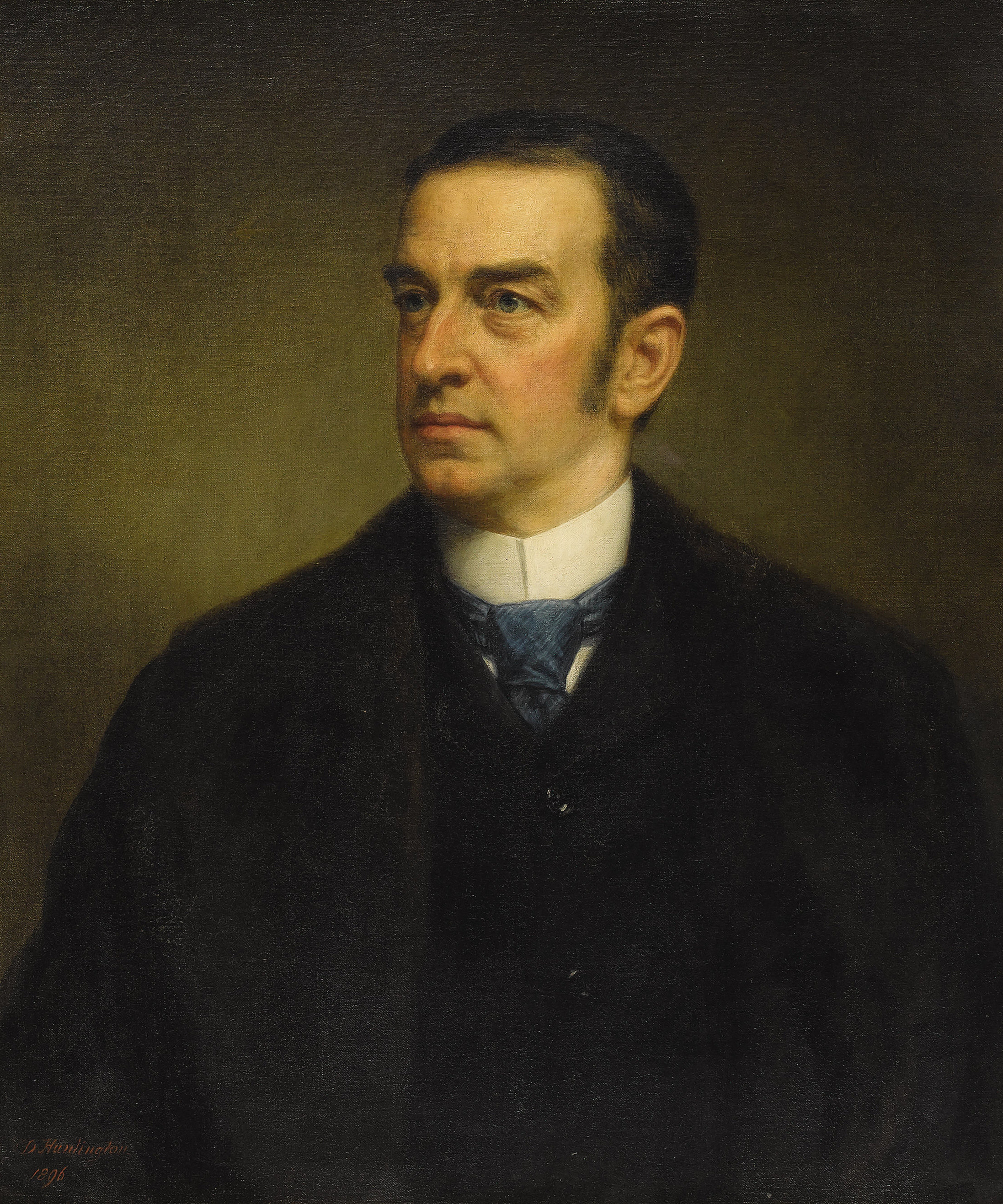
Portrait of Cornelius Vanderbilt II in 1896 by Daniel Huntington

In July 1896 Cornelius Vanderbilt II, the eldest brother of FW Vanderbilt, suffered a stroke. Conqueror took him to Newport, where a rubber-tyred berline was used as an improvised ambulance to take him from the yacht to The Breakers.

On 10 June 1899, Conqueror left New York for a Mediterranean cruise. She took FW Vanderbilt and guests to 21 ports, including Marseille on 25 August. She returned to New York against westerly gales carrying only her crew, and arrived on 12 September.

In March 1901, FW Vanderbilt took a group of male guests on a cruise on Conqueror to the West Indies. Ports of call included Port of Spain, Trinidad and San Juan, Puerto Rico. On the return voyage, Vanderbilt and his guests disembarked at Fernandina Beach, Florida, and Conqueror returned to New York carrying only her crew.

In summer 1903, Mr. and Mrs. Vanderbilt went to Germany for that year's Bayreuth Festival, and for the unveiling ceremony of the Richard Wagner Monument in Berlin. They left Conqueror in US waters, and allowed a Robert Collier to charter her for the summer. Sources variously refer to Collier and his wife as "Mr. and Mrs. "Robert J. Collier", "Mr. and Mrs. Robert J. F. Collier", or "Mr. and Mrs. Robert S. Collier". However, it seems to have been the publisher Robert J. Collier, as it was reported that "Mr. and Mrs. P. F. Collier" were to host a dinner for the couple in Newport. Robert J. Collier was the son of Peter Fenelon Collier. Robert Collier and his wife used Conqueror to spend most of August in Newport; to visit New Haven, Connecticut; and to see a sailing-yacht race off New York.

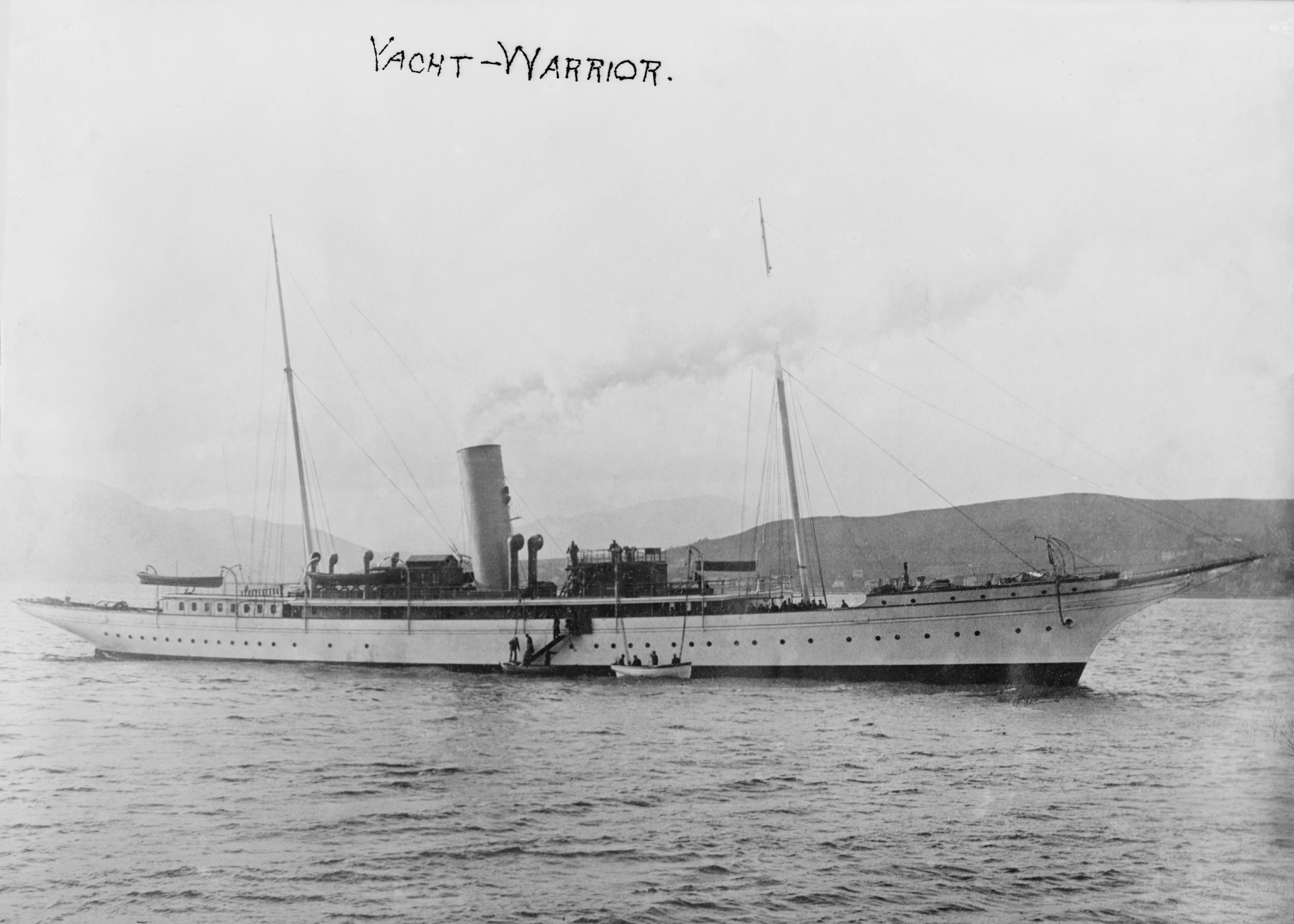
Warrior in 1910

FK Vanderbilt ordered a new yacht from a shipbuilder in Scotland. Warrior was launched on 4 February 1904, and delivered a few months later. She was more than 60 feet (18 m) longer than Conqueror, and her beam was more than 8 feet (2.4 m) greater. She had twin screws, and was rated at more than three times the power of Conqueror. However, Mr. and Mrs. Vanderbilt used Conqueror to attend Kiel Week in Germany in June 1905, and to return across the North Atlantic to the US that July.

== 1909 tax case ==
The Payne–Aldrich Tariff Act became law on 5 August 1909. Its Section 37 applied a tax of either $7 per ton or 35 percent ad valorem on foreign-built yachts. Some owners paid, but others objected to the tax being applied retrospectively to yachts built before the act was passed. By 17 September, FW Vanderbilt had asked William Loeb Jr., Collector of the Port of New York, to appraise Conqueror for the new tax. However, on 17 November a United States Assistant Attorney General filed lawsuits in a United States circuit court against more than 30 yacht-owners who had failed to pay the new tax. FW Vanderbilt was among those sued, having failed to pay the tax on either Conqueror or Warrior.

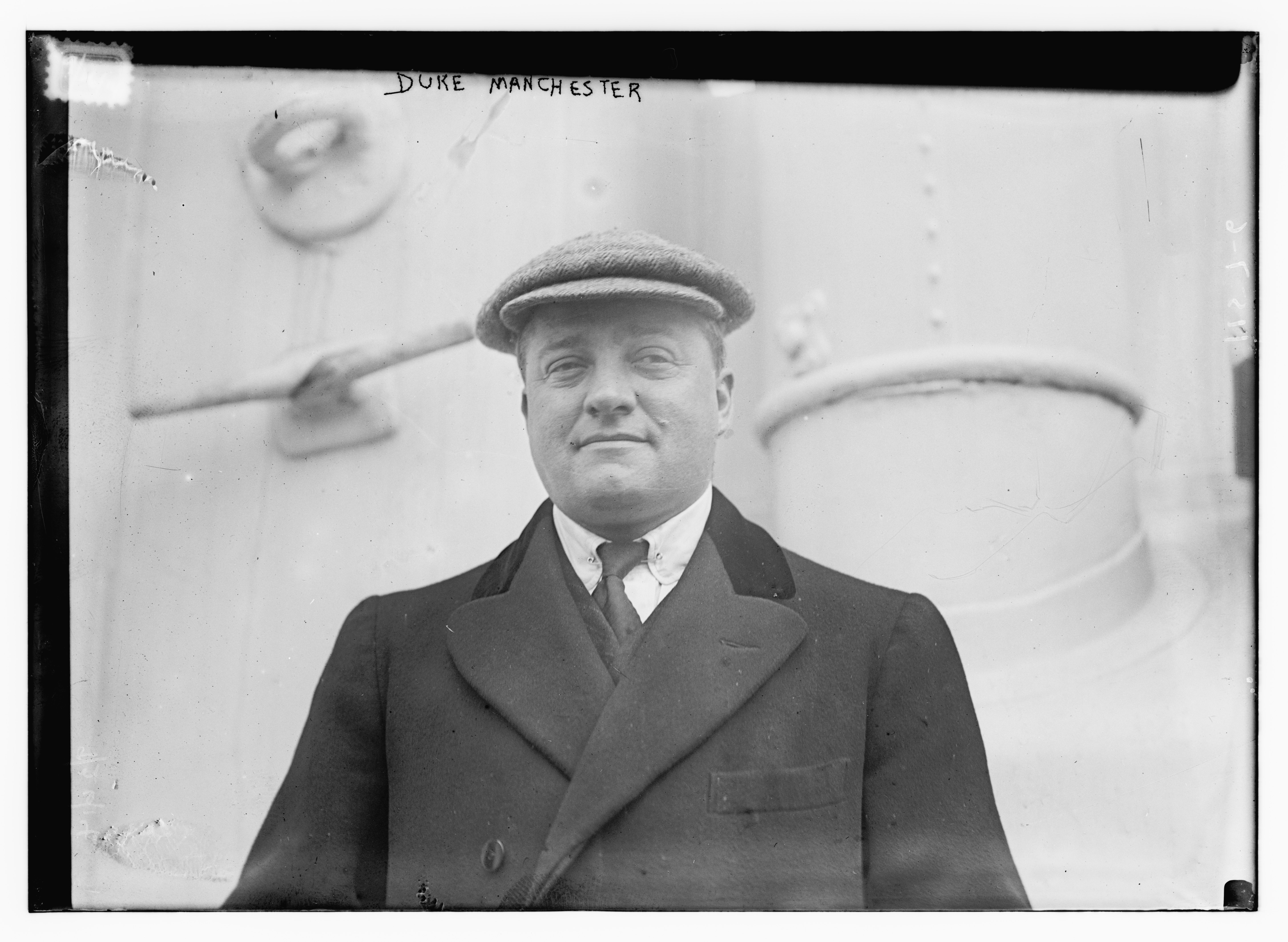
William Montagu, 9th Duke of Manchester

FW Vanderbilt did not use Conqueror in 1911. She lay in Erie Basin, out of commission. Vanderbilt wanted to sell her, and she was valued at $85,000. That August the Duke of Manchester bought her. He registered her in London, and her code letters were JDKF. By 1914 she was equipped with wireless telegraphy, and her call sign was GID.

== HMY Conqueror II ==
In the First World War the UK Admiralty requisitioned Conqueror. She was armed with two 6-pounder guns, and by 1 February 1915 she had been commissioned as HMY Conqueror II, with the pennant number 051.

On 25 September 1916, Conqueror II was patrolling with the naval trawler HMT Sarah Alice in Fair Isle Channel. They sighted a British steamship displaying no number, so they went to investigate. She was later identified as the cargo ship St. Gothard, which the Admiralty was using as a store ship.

As the patrol headed for St. Gothard, the U-boat SM U-52 fired three torpedoes. The first hit Sarah Alice, sinking her with all hands. The third hit Conqueror II; sinking her at position 59°44′N 01°35′W. U-52 also sank St. Gothard, but without loss of life. 16 men were killed on Sarah Alice, and 17 on Conqueror II, including her commanding officer, Commander Thomas Agassiz, RNR. Another 17 men from Conqueror II survived in Carley floats, and at 04:00 hrs the next morning the destroyer HMS Sylvia rescued them.

== Bibliography ==
- Lloyd's Register of Yachts. London: Lloyd's Register of Shipping. 1911 – via Internet Archive.
- Lloyd's Register of Yachts. London: Lloyd's Register of Shipping. 1912 – via Internet Archive.
- Lloyd's Register of Yachts. London: Lloyd's Register of Shipping. 1914 – via Internet Archive.
- The Marconi Press Agency Ltd (1914). The Year Book of Wireless Telegraphy and Telephony. London: The Marconi Press Agency Ltd.
- Mercantile Navy List. London. 1890 – via Crew List Index Project.
- Mercantile Navy List. London. 1914 – via Crew List Index Project.
- Yacht Register. London: Lloyd's Register of British and Foreign Shipping. 1889 – via Internet Archive.
- Yacht Register. London: Lloyd's Register of British and Foreign Shipping. 1892 – via Internet Archive.
