= Thomas H. Howard =

American clubman (1862–1904)

- Born: December 6, 1862; Providence, Rhode Island, U.S.
- Died: June 4, 1904 (aged 41); Hyde Park, New York, U.S.
- Spouse: Rose Anthony Post (m. 1892)
- Children: Elizabeth Stuyvesant Howard; Thomas Howard Howard
- Parent(s): Ezra Williams Howard; Elizabeth Stuyvesant Neilson Howard

Thomas Howard Howard (December 6, 1862 – June 4, 1904) was an American clubman who was prominent in New York and Newport society during the Gilded Age.

== Early life ==
Howard was born in Providence, Rhode Island, on December 6, 1862. He was the son of Ezra Williams Howard (1818–1869), a graduate of Brown University (where he was a member of Alpha Delta Phi) and Harvard Law School, and Elizabeth Stuyvesant (née Neilson) Howard (1828–1902). Among his siblings were Elizabeth Stuyvesant Howard (who died young), John Neilson Howard (a real estate dealer), Ezra Williams Howard (who also died young), and Marion Clifford Howard. After his father's death, his mother donated $2,000 towards the erection of St. John's Memorial Church in Parsons, Kansas, which was organized in June 1874.

His maternal grandparents were John Neilson and Margaret Ann (née Fish) Neilson. Through his maternal grandmother, he was a direct descendant of Peter Stuyvesant, the last Dutch director-general of New Amsterdam, as she was the daughter of Nicholas Fish and sister of Hamilton Fish, who served as governor of New York, a U.S. senator, and U.S. secretary of state. Through his maternal grandfather, he was a descendant of Col. John Neilson, an officer in the Revolutionary army and a founder of Rutgers University.

== Career ==
After marrying Rose, Howard became involved in business and served as the manager of Hyde Park, the estate of his wife's uncle (by marriage), Frederick W. Vanderbilt located in Hyde Park, New York, and built between 1896 and 1899. While Vanderbilt was building his home, he also built a large home for the Howards near his home, that today is known as the Howard Mansion. The mansion, a two-story, six-bay, eclectic dwelling built of uncoursed fieldstone, was designed by architect Charles Follen McKim of McKim, Mead & White. In 1901, a two-story Tudor-style carriage house was built that features a two-story, polygonal bay with a polygonal roof.

=== Society life ===
In February 1892, Howard and his newly married wife were included in Ward McAllister's "Four Hundred", purported to be an index of New York's best families, published in The New York Times. Conveniently, 400 was the number of people that could fit into Mrs. Astor's ballroom. According to The New York Times, Howard, a member of the prestigious Knickerbocker Club, was one of the "best known men in New York society and the leader of many cotillions."

In Newport, Rhode Island, the Howards stayed at Rough Point, the Vanderbilt cottage designed by Peabody & Stearns and owned by Rose's aunt and uncle and completed in 1892.

== Personal life ==
On January 19, 1892, Howard was married to Rose Anthony Post (d. 1949), who was known as "Miss Spriggie Post", at the Church of the Heavenly Rest in New York City. Rose was the daughter of William Post and Rosalie DeWolfe (née Anthony) Post and the sister of William Post and Margaret Van Alen Bruguiére (who married James Laurens Van Alen, a grandson of Caroline Schermerhorn Astor in 1900). Rose was also the niece of Louise Vanderbilt (née Anthony), as Rose's mother and Louise were both daughters of Charles Lee Anthony, a successful dry-goods merchant in New York City. Together, they were the parents of:

- Elizabeth Stuyvesant Howard (1897–1988), who married U.S. Representative Robert Winthrop Kean (1893–1980).
- Thomas Howard Howard (b. 1899)

Howard died in Hyde Park on June 4, 1904. His widowed wife, along with her aunt, remained prominent in Hudson Valley society, and Rose was a friend and member of the same sewing circle as Sara Delano Roosevelt, the mother of Franklin D. Roosevelt, who also lived along the Hudson River in Hyde Park. Rose died at her home, 1115 Fifth Avenue (the southeast corner of East 93rd Street and Fifth Avenue) in New York City in April 1949.

=== Descendants ===
Through his daughter Elizabeth, he was the posthumous grandfather of six; three boys: Robert Kean, Hamilton Kean and Thomas Howard Kean (b. 1935), who served two terms as the governor of New Jersey, and three daughters, Elizabeth Kean, Rose Kean and Katharine Kean. He is also the great-grandfather of Thomas Kean, Jr. (b. 1968), who was the minority leader of the New Jersey State Senate.
