= Howard Mansion and Carriage House =

Historic house in New York, United States

- U.S. National Register of Historic Places
- Location within New York Location within the United States
- Location: Howard Blvd., Hyde Park, New York
- Coordinates: 41°47′53″N 73°56′5″W
- Area: 12.9 acres (5.2 ha)
- Built: 1896
- Architect: McKim, Charles F.
- Architectural style: Late 19th And 20th Century Revivals, Late Victorian
- NRHP reference No.: 93000862
- Added to NRHP: August 19, 1993

Howard Mansion and Carriage House is a historic mansion and carriage house in Hyde Park, New York.

== History ==
It was designed by architect Charles Follen McKim (1847-1909) and built in 1896. It is a two-story, six-bay, eclectic dwelling built of uncoursed fieldstone. The house is rectangular in plan and has a wood shingled roof with overhanging twin gables. The front entrance is a Dutch door and features a portico supported by two square, bracketed columns. The carriage house is a two-story, wood frame, stucco covered, Tudor style building built in 1901. It features a two-story, polygonal bay with a polygonal roof. Frederick W. Vanderbilt had the house built for his nephew, Thomas H. Howard.

=== National Register of Historic Places ===
It was added to the National Register of Historic Places in 1993.

== See also ==
- Thomas H. Howard
- Vanderbilt Mansion National Historic Site
