= Margaret Van Alen Bruguiére =

American socialite and art collector

Margaret Van Alen Bruguière
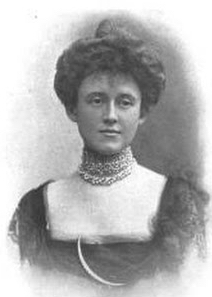
- Margaret Post Van Alen, from a 1903 publication.
- Born: Margaret Louise Post; July 15, 1876; Newport, Rhode Island
- Died: January 20, 1969 (aged 92); Newport, Rhode Island
- Occupations: Socialite, art collector, philanthropist
- Political party: Republican
- Spouses: James Laurens Van Alen (m. 1900; died 1927) Louis Bruguière (m. 1948; died 1954)
- Children: James Henry Van Alen II
- Relatives: Rose Post Howard (sister)

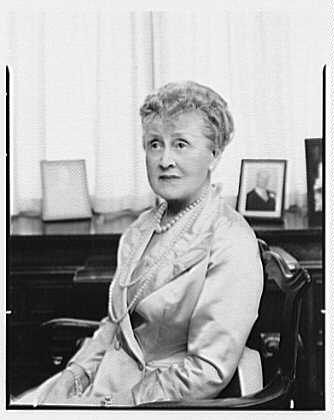
Mrs. Brugiere in 1957

Margaret "Daisy" Van Alen Bruguière (née Post; July 15, 1876 – January 20, 1969) was an American socialite, art collector and the niece of Frederick Vanderbilt. From the 1940s until her death, she was the leader of the social scene in Newport, Rhode Island.

== Early life ==
On July 15, 1876, she was born as Margaret Louise Post in Newport, Rhode Island, to William Post (1848–1900) and Rosalie DeWolf Anthony (1844–1929), a descendant of the early settlers of Rhode Island. Her maternal aunt, Louise Vanderbilt (née Anthony; 1844–1926), was married to Frederick Vanderbilt, a grandson of Cornelius Vanderbilt. Her younger brother was William Post and her sister was Rose Post Howard, the wife of Thomas H. Howard.

She spent her summers at the Post family's residence in Newport, 'Rosetta', and winters at her uncle Frederick Vanderbilt's Hudson Valley estate, Hyde Park. After marrying James Laurens Van Alen, she moved into the Van Alen family's Newport mansion, 'Wakehurst', an exact replica of Wakehurst Place in England, which would serve as her home for more than seventy years.

== Philanthropy ==
She was known for supporting a number of causes, including the Red Cross and Newport Hospital, in addition to a number of local charities in Newport and Washington. When her son, Jimmy Van Alen, purchased the Newport Casino and began restoring it, she donated $10,000 towards the restoration.

She gave $10,000 for the landscaping and renaming of Washington Square Park in Newport in honor of her friend, President Dwight D. Eisenhower. She was also a prominent support of the Republican Party, and was known for hosting political fundraisers at her various homes in Newport and Washington.

=== Wakehurst ===
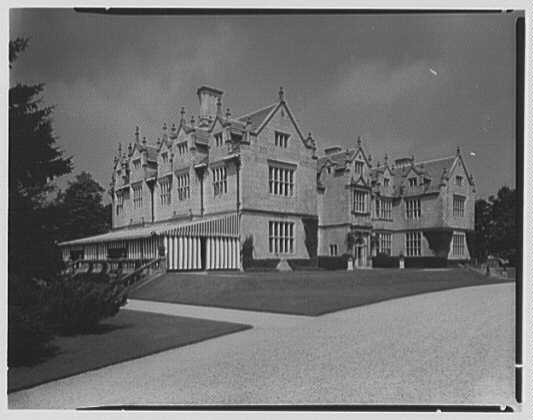
Wakehurst in 1958

Every summer would be spent in Newport at her home 'Wakehurst' (which had been legally deeded to her in 1927), where she would host the most fashionable entertainments. By the 1940s, she had become known as the new leader of Newport's 'High Society', the Newport winter season officially starting with her annual Christmas party. One was not considered an "insider" unless one had received TWO invitations to Mrs. Van Alen's mansion. The first, most likely for tea and crackers, was for Mrs. Van Alen to have a chance to survey the potential candidate. Only if a second invitation was received, for dinner, was acceptance assured. By the 1960s, many of Newport's grand mansions that lined Bellevue Avenue had been turned into public museums or schools. "Wakehurst is the last 'properly run' [estate] left in Newport."

=== Later years ===
She spent most of the 1930s serving as a nurse to her ailing uncle, Frederick Vanderbilt, at Hyde Park. When he died in 1938, he left the majority share of his $78 million fortune to her, along with his Hyde Park estate. She later donated the estate as a public park and museum, today known as the Vanderbilt Mansion National Historic Site.

== Personal life ==
In 1900, Margaret, who was called "Daisy" by her family and friends, married James Laurens Van Alen (1878–1927), the son of James John Van Alen (1848–1923) and grandson of Caroline Schermerhorn Astor (1830–1908), "the Mrs. Astor". Before his death in 1927, they were the parents of:

- James Henry Van Alen II (1902–1991), who married Candace Baird Alig (1912–2002), in 1948.
- William Laurens Van Alen (1907–2003), who married Elizabeth Brinton Kent (1911–2015), the daughter of A. Atwater Kent, the inventor and prominent radio manufacturer, in 1931.
- Louise Astor Van Alen (1910–1998), who married Prince Alexis Mdivani in 1931. They divorced in 1932, and in 1933 he married Barbara Hutton. In 1936, she married his brother, Prince Serge Mdivani, who was divorced from Pola Negri. Serge died during a polo match shortly thereafter, also in 1936. She later met Alexander Saunderson (d. 2004), a British soldier who was the great-grandson of Alexander Saunderson. They married in 1947 and remained married until her death in 1998.

In 1948, Daisy Van Alen married yachtsman Louis Sather Bruguière (1882–1954), son of Louis S. Bruguière and grandson of Peder Sather, who had survived the sinking of the S.S. Arabic. They lived together at Wakehurst and in Washington, D.C. until his death in 1954.

She died in 1969 as the wealthiest woman in Newport, with her estate being valued at $47 million. In her obituary, she was officially declared the "Dowager Empress of American Society".

=== Descendants ===
Her grandson, William L. Van Alen Jr. (1933–2010), a lawyer, was married to Virginia Guest, the daughter of Elizabeth Polk Guest and Raymond R. Guest, a horse breeder and former U.S. Ambassador to Ireland in 1975. Her maternal grandfather was Frank Polk, the first United States Under Secretary of State, and her paternal grandfather was Frederick Guest, an MP and Secretary of State for Air and the third son of Ivor Guest, 1st Baron Wimborne.

== In popular culture ==
- As The Money Burns (2020–present) website, a history podcast reconstructing the Great Depression through the lives of heirs and heiresses. Daisy Van Alen's daughter Louise Van Alen is a primary character, and Daisy as well as her two sons and Louise's brothers appear regularly throughout the series.
