= Pine Tree Point =

Great Camp of the Vanderbilt family

Coordinates: 44°24′29.05″N 74°15′47.51″W

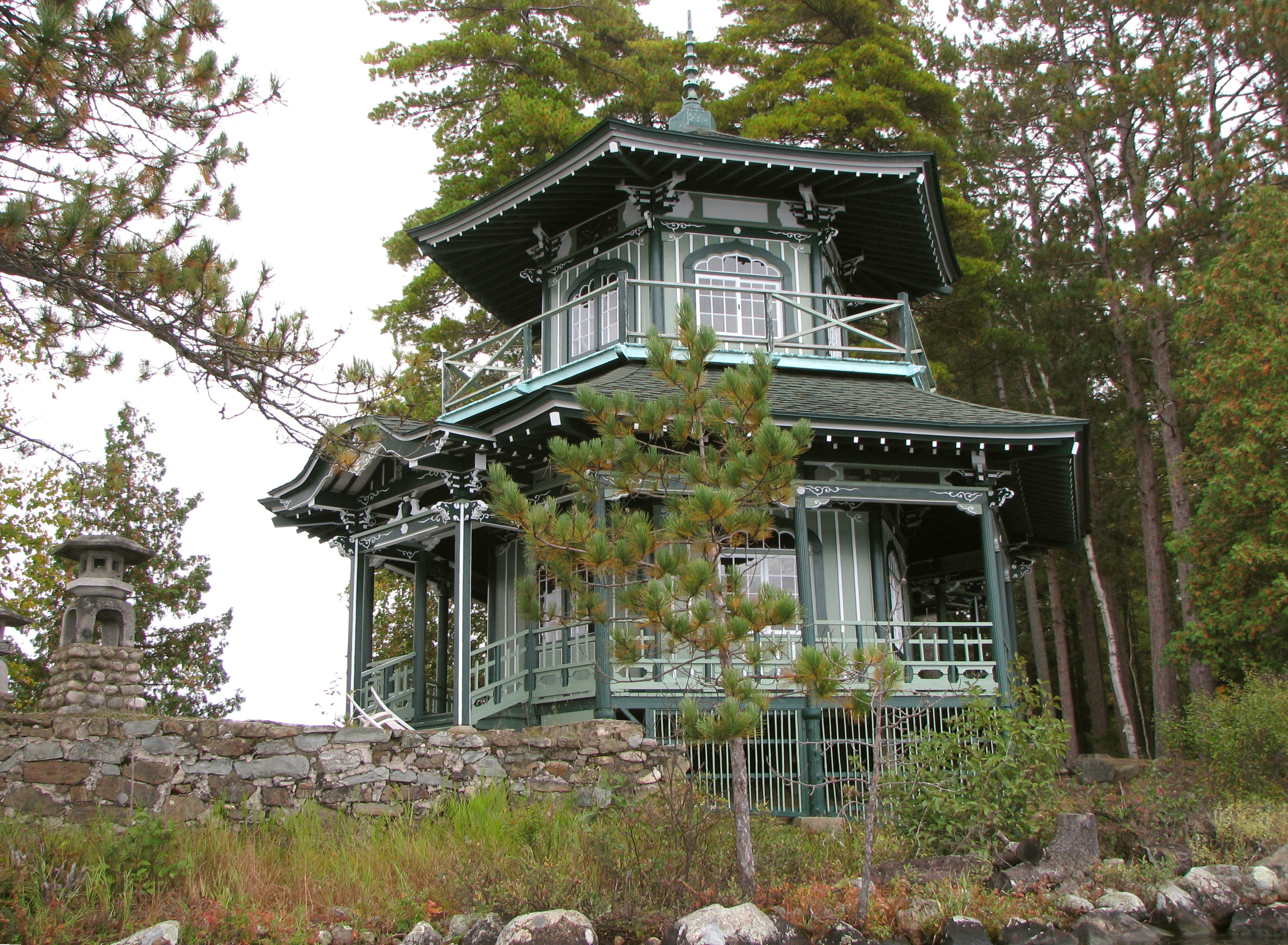
Tea Room aka the Pagoda

Pine Tree Point is an Adirondack Great Camp on Upper St. Regis Lake.

== History ==
Pine Tree Point was the camp of Frederick William Vanderbilt, a director of the New York Central Railroad for 61 years. Vanderbilt maintained residences in New York City at 450 Fifth Avenue, Hyde Park ("Vanderbilt Mansion National Historic Site"), Newport ("Rough Point"), and Bar Harbor ("Sonogee").

Vanderbilt hired Japanese artisans from the Pan-American Exposition of 1901, held in Buffalo to construct Japanese-style buildings, remodel existing buildings, including a pagoda with an elaborate spiral staircase, and a Japanese cottage. Servants were required to wear Japanese clothing while waiting on guests; some of the servants were mortified.

In the early 1900s, Herbert L. Pratt purchased Pine Tree Point from Vanderbilt. Pratt was the son of Standard oil industrialist Charles Pratt, and like his father before him, was a leading figure in the U.S. oil industry and head of Standard Oil Company of New York from 1923. This company eventually became Mobil.

== Gallery ==
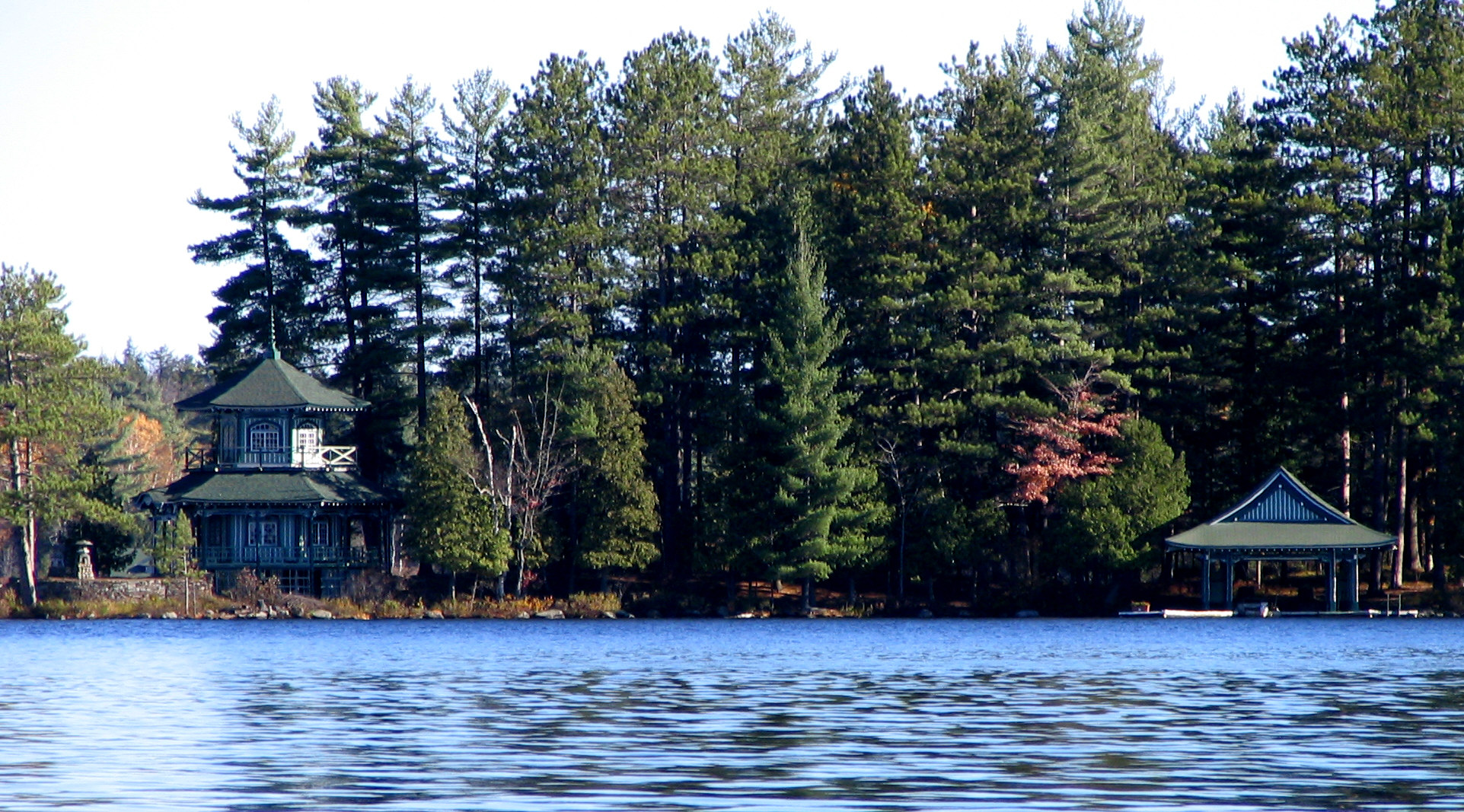
Pine Tree Point

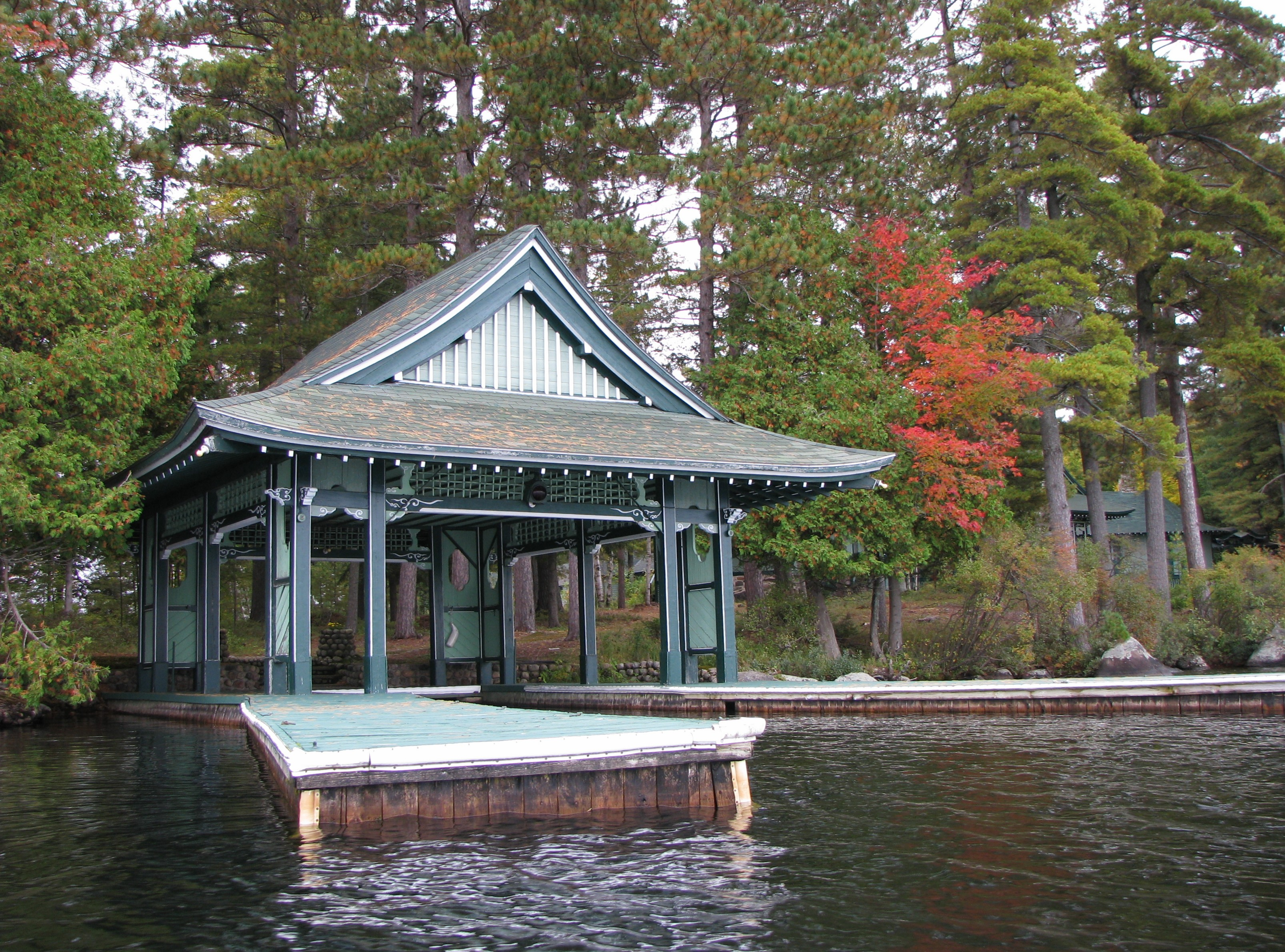
Dock aka the Front Dock

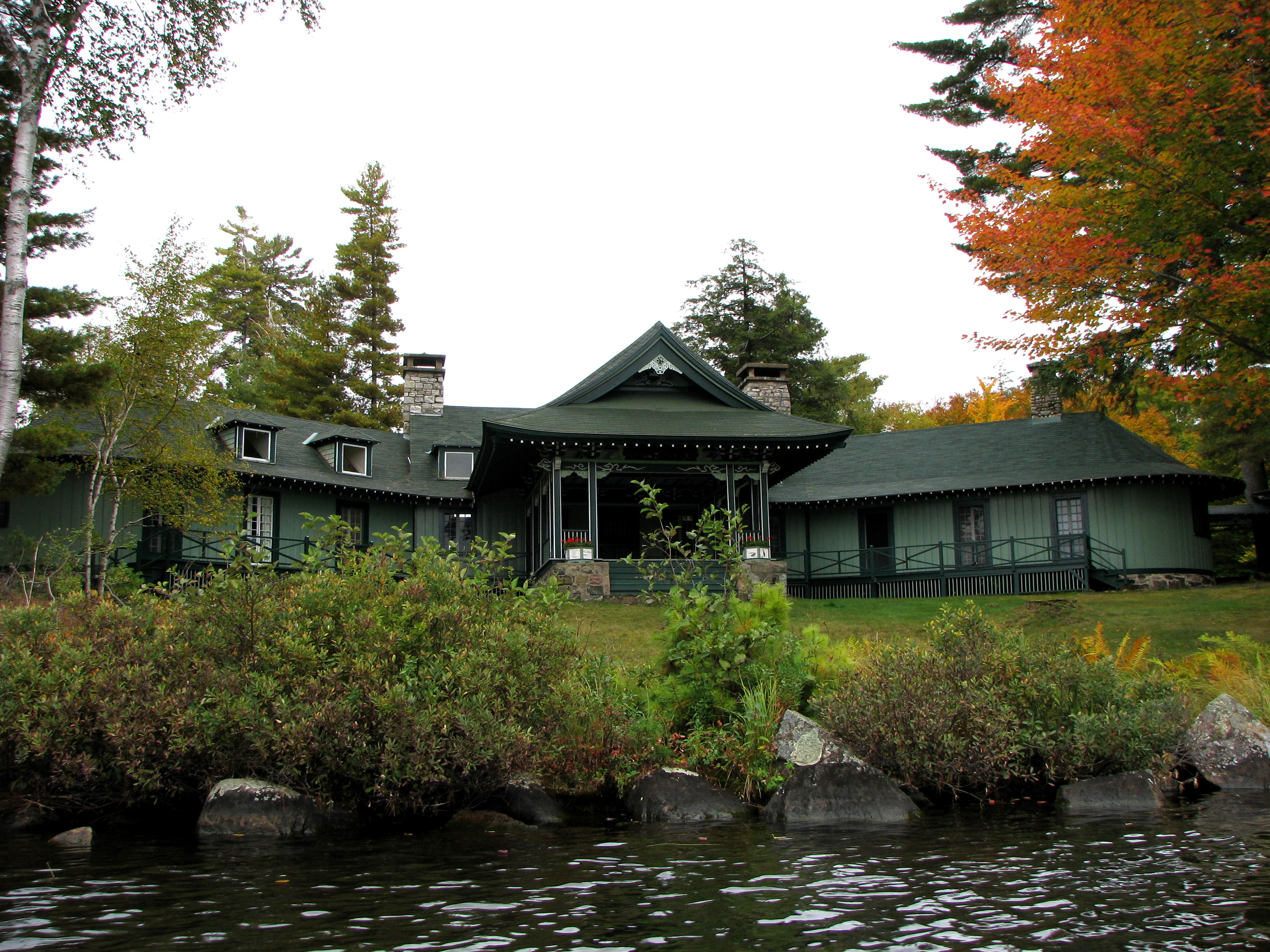
Main Lodge
