= Louise Vanderbilt =

Heiress

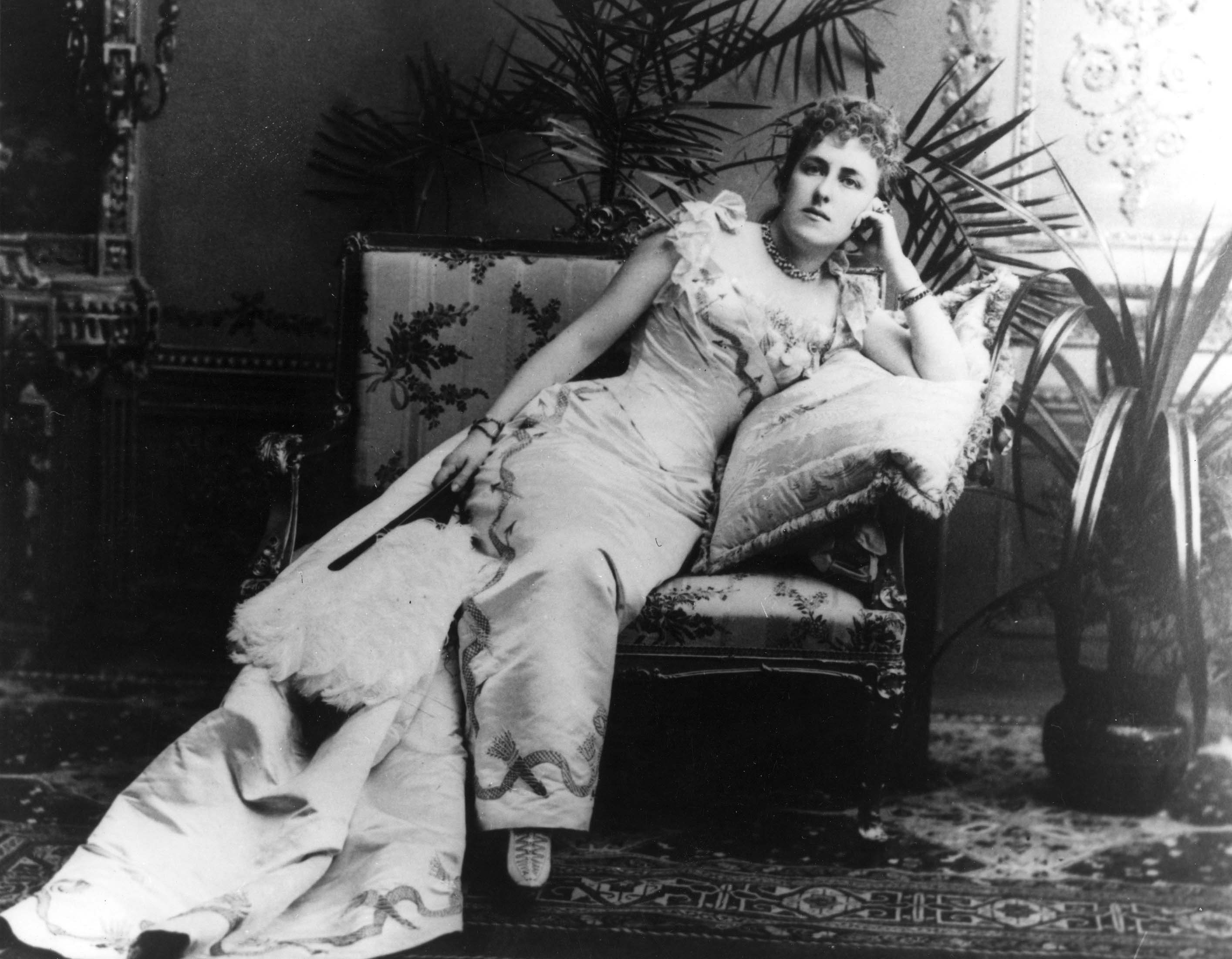
- Born: Louisa Holmes Anthony; September 4, 1854
- Died: August 21, 1926 (aged 71); Paris, France
- Spouses: Alfred Torrance (m. 1868; div. 1877) Frederick William Vanderbilt (m. 1878)

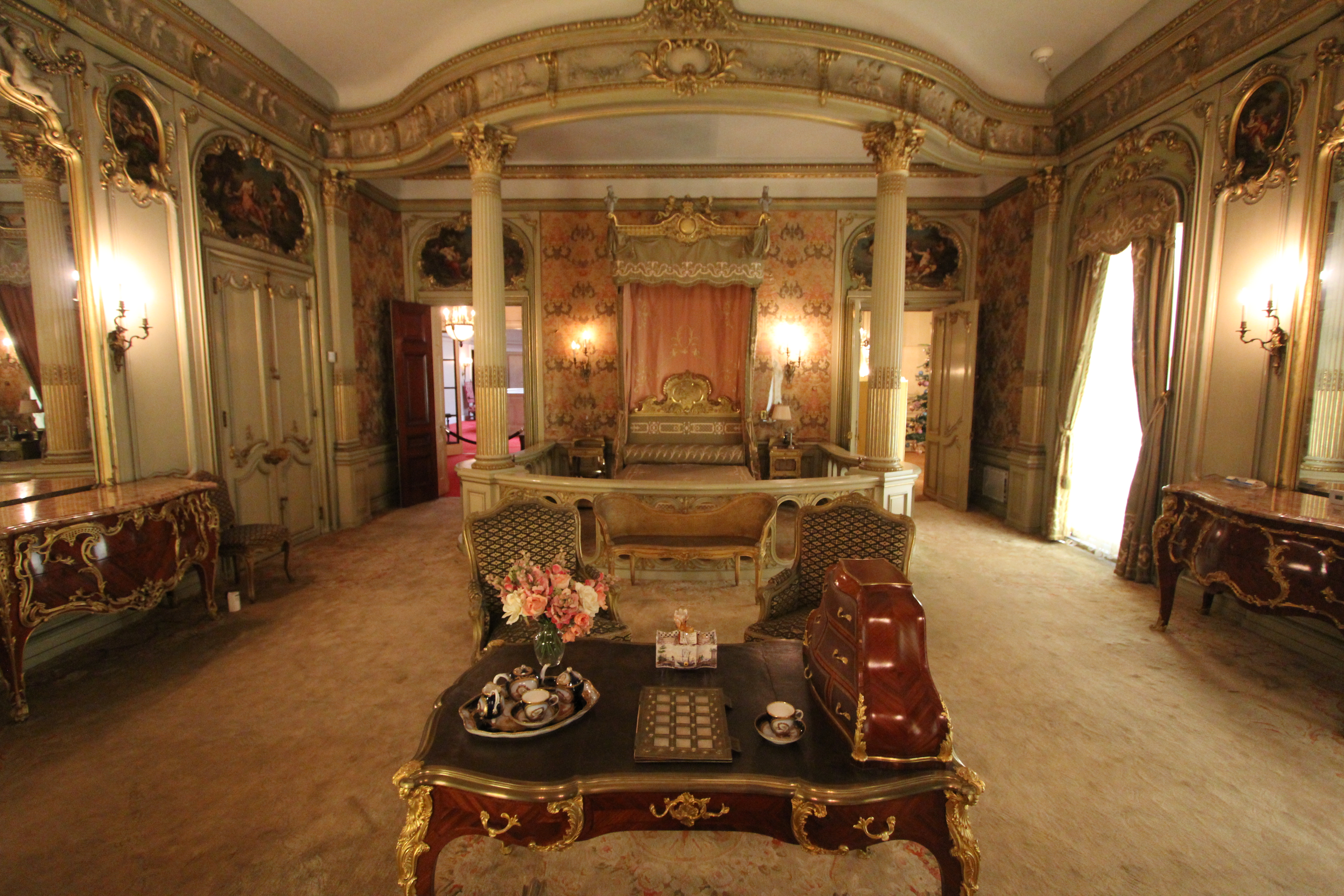
Louise Vanderbilt's bedroom at Hyde Park. Design by Ogden Codman. (Photo by Kevin Oldenburg for NPS).

Louise Holmes Anthony Vanderbilt (September 4, 1854 – August 21, 1926) was an American heiress and socialite. Her philanthropist causes included educational opportunities and entertainments for the local community near her Hyde Park, New York home, the annual Thanksgiving dinner for the newsboys in Newport, Rhode Island, several New York City based charities, and the Anthony Home which she founded in 1913.

== Early life ==
Louise was born Louisa Holmes Anthony on September 4, 1854, probably in Brooklyn, New York. She was the youngest daughter of Catherine (née Holmes) Anthony (1824–1882) and Charles Lee Anthony (d. 1874), both of whom were born in Rhode Island. Louise had two sisters, Rosalie DeWolf (1844–1929), who married William Post, and Catherine "Kate" Lee (1845–1907), who married Henry Anthon Heiser.

Her father was a socially prominent and wealthy dry-goods merchant in New York City under the firm name of Anthony & Hall. Among her extended family members were nieces Rose Post Howard, who married Thomas H. Howard (a descendant of Peter Stuyvesant), and Margaret Van Alen Bruguiére, who married James Laurens Van Alen (a grandson of William Backhouse Astor Jr. and Caroline Schermerhorn Astor).

== Personal life ==
In 1872, Louise married Alfred Torrance (1852–1887), the son of Daniel Torrance and Sophia Johnson (née Vanderbilt) Torrance. His sisters were Adelaide Torrance, who married Meredith Howland, and Marie Torrance, who married John A. Hadden Jr. Alfred, a grandson of Commodore Cornelius Vanderbilt, was a horseman of some reputation in London, Paris, and New York. She divorced Torrance in 1877.

The following year on December 17, 1878, Louise married Torrance's cousin Frederick William Vanderbilt (1856–1938), son of William Henry Vanderbilt and Maria Louisa Kissam Vanderbilt. Apparently wed in secret, the marriage was the subject of some gossip. The New-York Daily Tribune reported her father-in-law's displeasure upon hearing of the secret marriage, noting they were "debarred of the parental mansion and deprived of the parental blessing." This reaction may have been overstated. Frederick's father later left the couple his home located at 459 Fifth Avenue.

Louise died at the Hotel Ritz in Paris on August 21, 1926, following "a short illness caused by complications setting in from a slight throat infection." Frederick returned to the United States with Louise's body aboard the White Star Liner Homeric. A section of the baggage room on the lower deck was made into a chapel with wreaths, floral arrangements, and the spiral staircase leading to it draped with black. She was interred in the Vanderbilt family mausoleum at Moravian Cemetery on Staten Island.

=== Residences ===
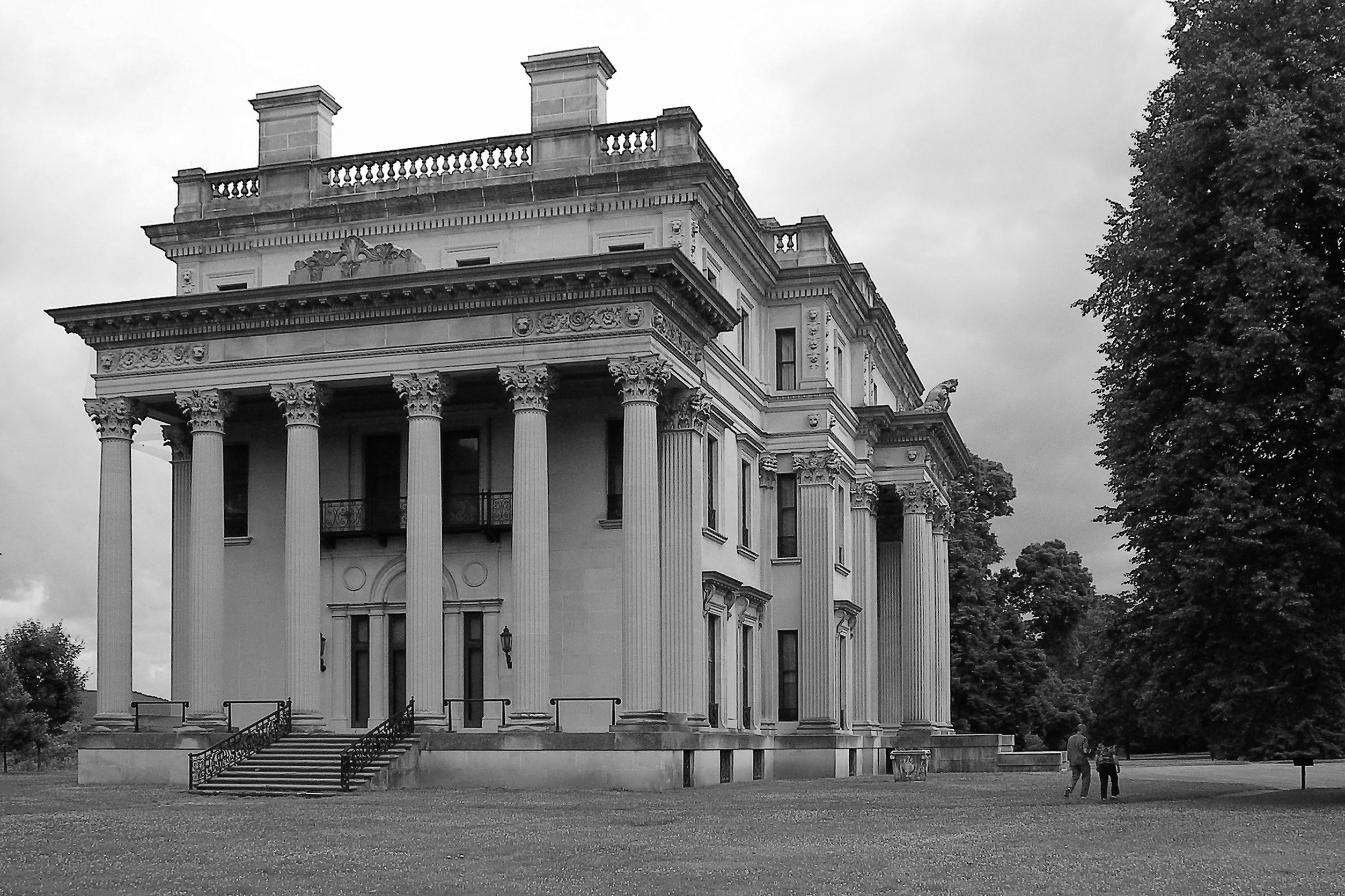
Hyde Park, the Vanderbilt home in the Hudson Valley.

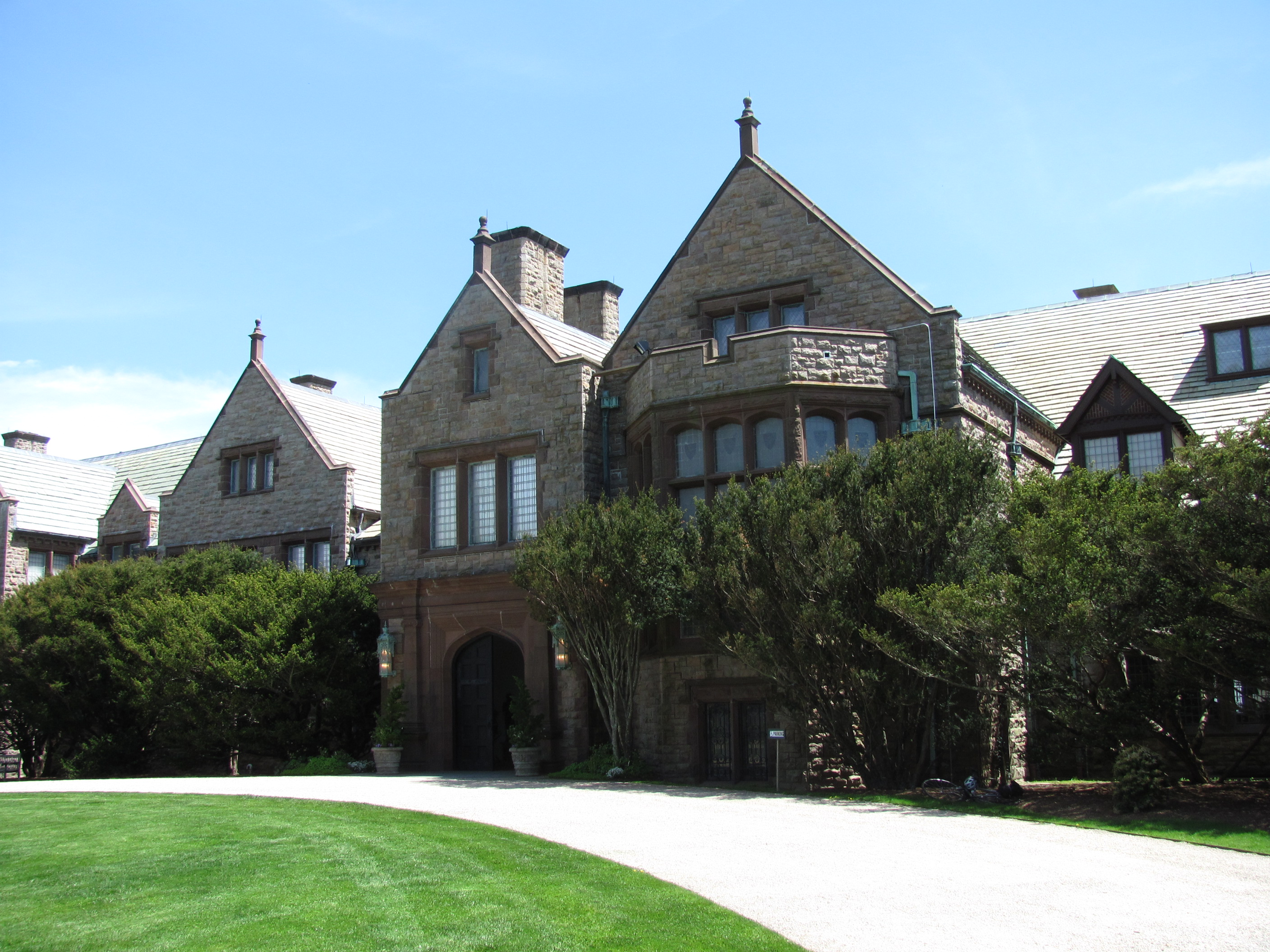
Rough Point, the Vanderbilt home in Newport, Rhode Island

During their marriage, which lasted nearly fifty years, Louise and Frederick made their New York City home at several locations. They also built "Rough Point" in Newport, Rhode Island, "Pine Tree Point" on Upper St. Regis Lake in the Adirondacks, and "Hyde Park" in Hyde Park, New York. In 1919, Louise purchased "Sonogee" at Bar Harbor, Maine.

=== Legacy ===
Record of Louise's generosity is consistently noted by those who knew her. Friends and employees remembered her as generous and kind. Her generosity toward the Village of Hyde Park is documented in oral interviews recorded by the National Park Service. Louise provided educational opportunities and entertainments for the young men and women of the village. She established a reading room, attached to St. James' Chapel, sponsored lectures at the Town Hall, established a young man's club room in the village, and brought the Red Cross to Hyde Park in 1911. In 1917, she was largely responsible for establishing the District Health Nurse in Hyde Park. During World War I, she joined wealthy neighbors to equip, clothe, and arm a Hyde Park Home Defense Company of sixty-five men. Employees reported that Louise knew almost every family in Hyde Park and through her agents often helped families in need, struggling with health or financial difficulties. She provided entertainments for village residents and their children, including ice cream festivals and, on at least one occasion, a steamer cruise on the Hudson River for all 700 residents of the village. She was known to distribute Christmas gifts to the children of Hyde Park.

At Newport, she sponsored an annual Thanksgiving dinner for the newsboys and messenger boys from 1891 to 1925. Usually 350 to 400 boys attended the dinner, entering the hall to orchestra music. On occasion, Louise attended the dinner. At her Newport home Rough Point, she hosted a Lawn Fete for the benefit of the Newport Society for the Prevention and Control of Tuberculosis.

Charities that benefited from her will at the time of her death included legacies in the sum of $10,000 each bequeathed to the New York Orthopedic Dispensary and Hospital, the Woman's Hospital, the Children's Aid Society, the American Society for the Prevention of Cruelty to Animals, the Stanton Street Helping Hand Association, and the New York Women's League for Animals, Inc. The largest single bequest was $300,000, to establish a trust fund for her Anthony Home, Inc., a model residential building for working women.

Frederick inherited some of Louise's jewelry and Sonogee, her house at Bar Harbor, Maine. The bulk of her estate was bequeathed to her two nieces and her sister. Other friends and employees inherited bequests of various amounts. Her estate was estimated at more than $1,000,000.
