= American Renaissance =

American architecture and arts movement (1876–1917)

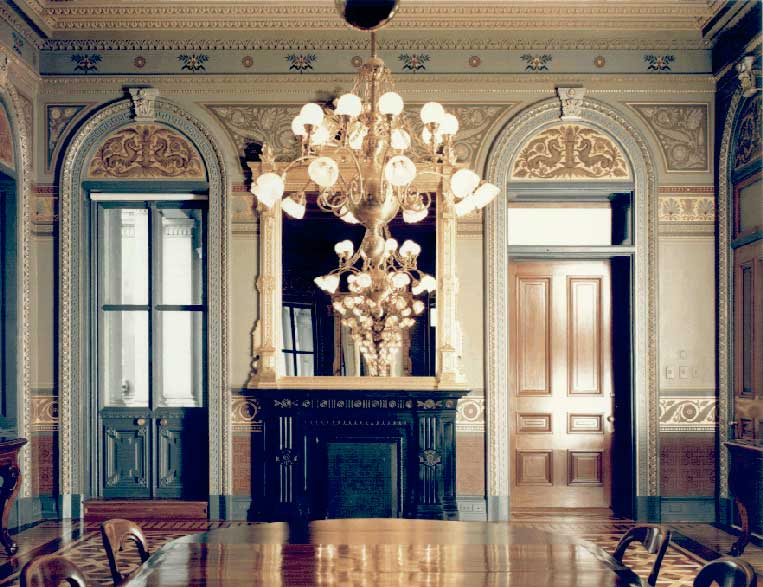
Gilded stencilling on an olive green ground in the Office of the Secretary of the Navy in the Eisenhower Executive Office Building in Washington, D.C. in 1879, reflecting American Renaissance-era art

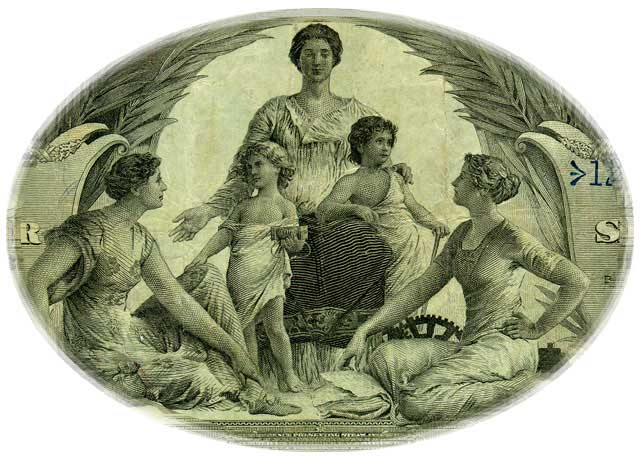
The central vignette of the US$2 bill, Edwin Blashfield's Science presents Steam and Electricity to Commerce and Manufacture, published in 1896

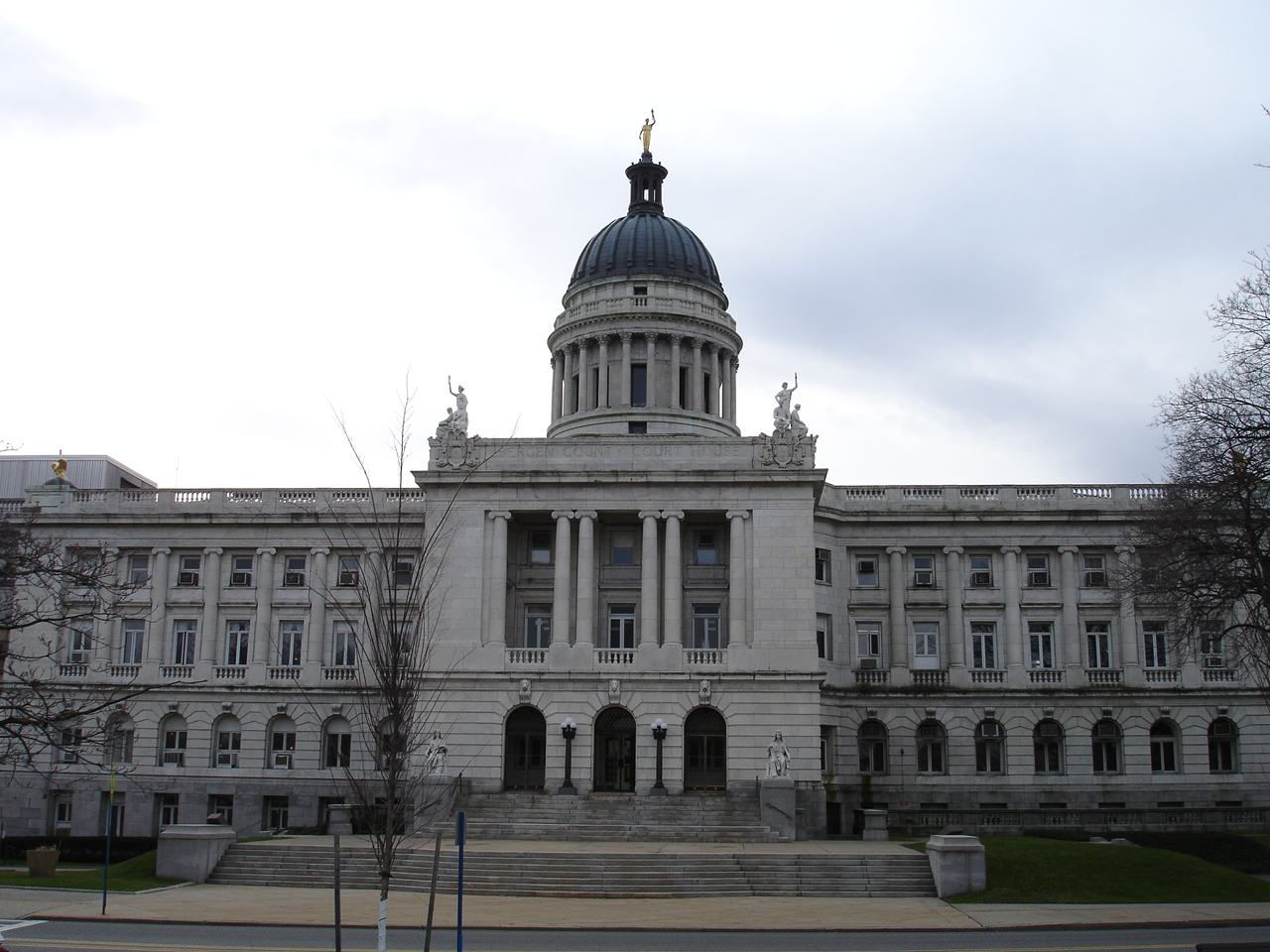
The Bergen County Court House in Hackensack, New Jersey, designed in the American Renaissance style

The American Renaissance was a period of American architecture and the arts from 1876 to 1917, characterized by renewed national self-confidence and a feeling that the United States was the heir to Greek democracy, Roman law, and Renaissance humanism. Local conditions and requirements of America, including the aforementioned nationalism, spurred this change of style, allowing it to slowly develop over time in various places around the United States. The era spans the period between the Centennial Exposition (celebrating the 100th anniversary of the signing of the Declaration of Independence) and the United States' entry into World War I.

A great variety of buildings were made using this style, such as townhouses, cottages, state houses, libraries, capitol buildings, museums, banks, railway terminals, and more.

== Building materials ==
Early buildings of the American Renaissance were of wood, plentiful in the United States, and often painted. As the country became wealthier, builders gradually followed the Greeks and Romans in their use of stone. For example, early columns of the period were carved of wood, but later architects and builders could use white marble, a more durable material, for intricate carvings and details.

Both materials had their benefits. Wood is more easily repaired and replaced given its lack of lengthy durability in addition to its charm, warmth, and personality, which is characteristic of the American style. Stone, especially white marble, has a shine and glow to it. It is also more durable and able to withstand harsh weather.

== Characteristics ==
Decorative elements, such as arches, domes, vaulted ceilings, and columns were commonplace during the American Renaissance. There was a strong desire for the revival of Classical forms, symmetrical designs, and elaborate decorative elements. A sense of national identity was created and explored through the use of local materials and motifs.

During the American Renaissance, the United States' preoccupation with national identity (or New Nationalism) was expressed by modernism and technology, as well as academic classicism. This classicism made way for a new form of creative and artistic rhetoric, which in turn helped establish the new aesthetic of the time. It expressed its self-confidence in new technologies, such as the wire cables of the Brooklyn Bridge in New York City. It found its cultural outlets in Prairie School houses and in Beaux-Arts architecture and sculpture, in the "City Beautiful" movement, and in the creation of the American empire. A goal of the "City Beautiful" movement, which coincides with the American Renaissance, was, "to shape American culture and society aesthetically, morally, and professionally". Through this goal, order, acculturation, and assimilation were meant to be brought to the American city, easing the transition for immigrants while also establishing a professional authority through architecture. Americans felt that their civilization was uniquely the modern heir, and that it had come of age. Politically and economically, this era coincides with the Gilded Age and the New Imperialism.

The classical architecture of the 1893 World's Columbian Exposition in Chicago, Illinois, impressed Henry Adams, who wrote that people "would some day talk about Hunt and Richardson, La Farge and Saint-Gaudens, Burnham and McKim and Stanford White, when their politicians and millionaires were quite forgotten." The unity and consistency of the symmetrical structures inspired many of Charles McKim's campus projects, a mall, and other buildings in the city center of Washington, D.C. At McKim's death in 1909, his architectural firm was the largest in the world, having produced nearly 900 buildings of Classical orders and finely proportioned masonry.

The theme is followed by Edwin Blashfield's mural The Evolution of Civilization in the dome of the reading room at the new Library of Congress.

The 1979 exhibition American Renaissance: 1876–1917 at the Brooklyn Museum helped revive interest in the movement.

== Notable examples ==
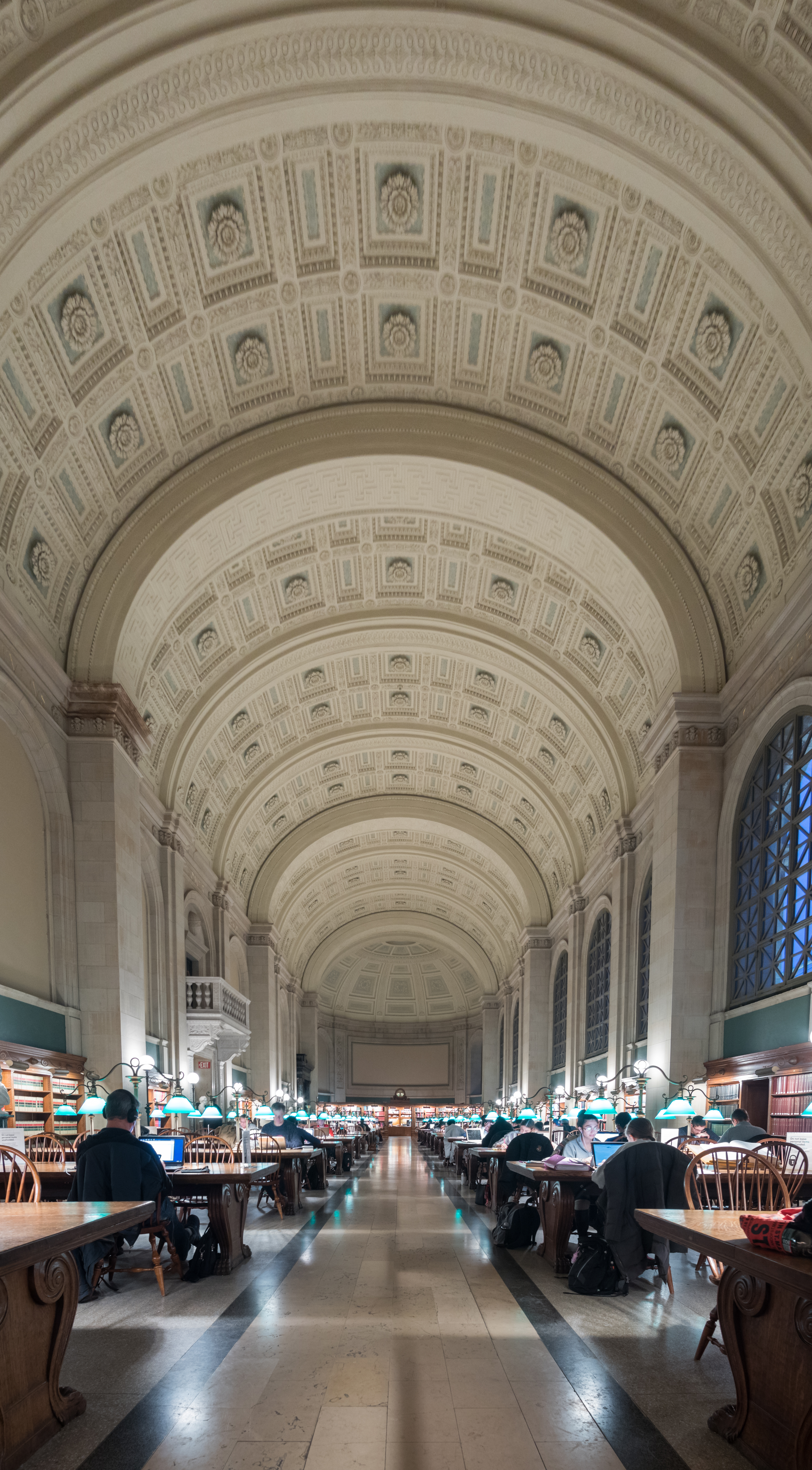
The Boston Public Library

- Cuyahoga County Courthouse (1906–1912): the exterior includes sculpture by Karl Bitter, Daniel Chester French, Herbert Adams, Isidore Konti and Herman Matzen, while the interior contains murals by Frank Brangwyn, Violet Oakley, Charles Yardley Turner, Max Bohm and Frederick Wilson. A stained glass window was designed and executed by Frederick Wilson and Charles Schweinfurth.
- San Francisco City Hall (completed 1915): designed by Arthur Brown, Jr, who also designed several other buildings in the style in San Francisco, including the San Francisco War Memorial Opera House, Veterans Building, Temple Emanuel, Coit Tower and the Federal office building at 50 United Nations Plaza.
- The Boston Public Library (1888-1895): designed and created by Charles McKim, inspired by the Bibliothèque Sainte-Geneviève in Paris, among other Classical structures. The interior contains a grand vaulted, coffered ceiling, lavish decorative elements, and large windows which provide natural light.
- The Metropolitan Museum of Art (1870s-1910): designed by Calvert Vaux and Jacob Wrey Mould, with work later done by Richard Morris Hunt and his son, Richard Howland Hunt, and the firm of McKim, Mead & White. This grand museum, being the fourth largest in the world, displays the American Renaissance style with its arched windows, grand columns, and lavish decorative elements present on the main facade and lobby.
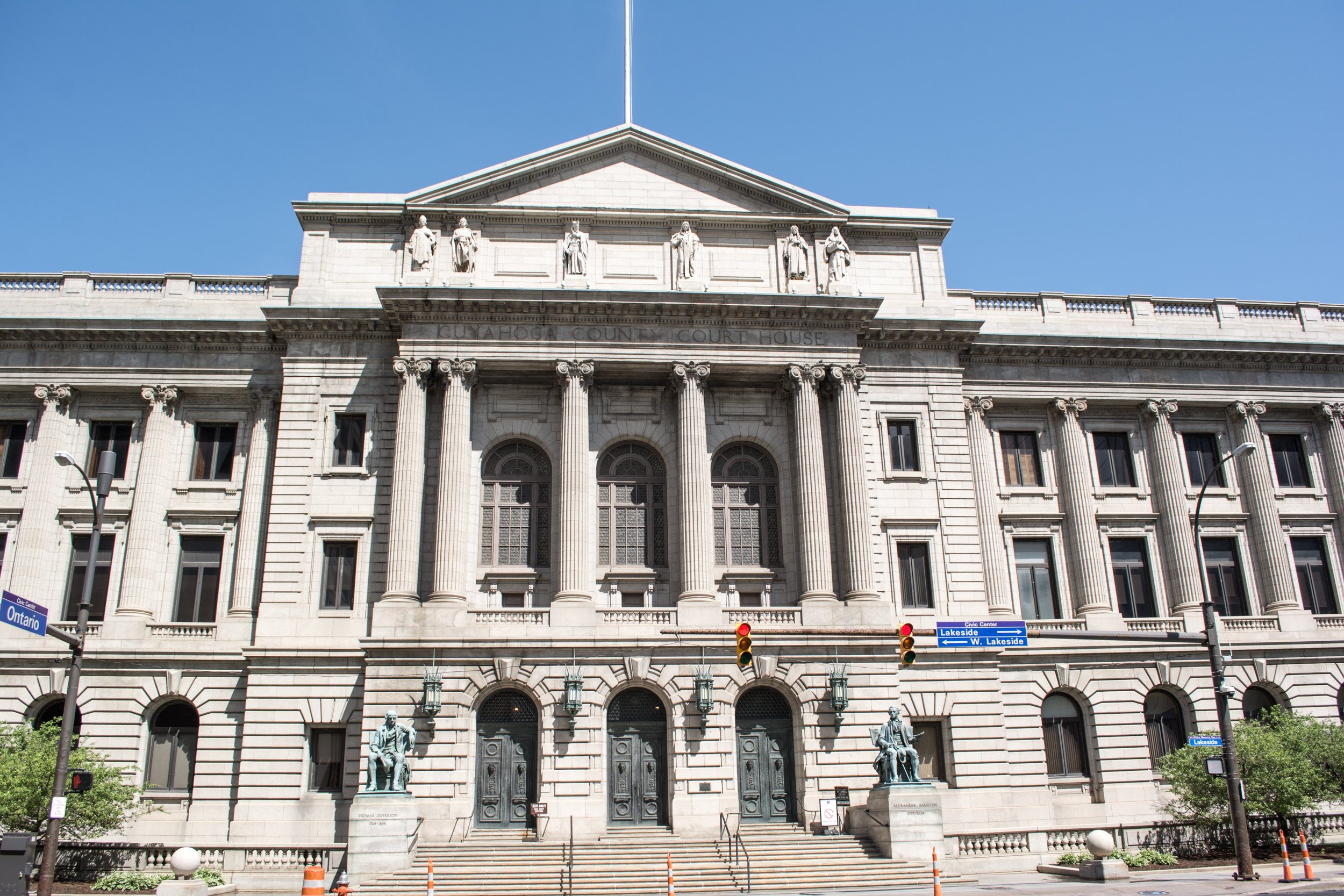
  Cuyahoga County Courthouse, in downtown Cleveland, Ohio
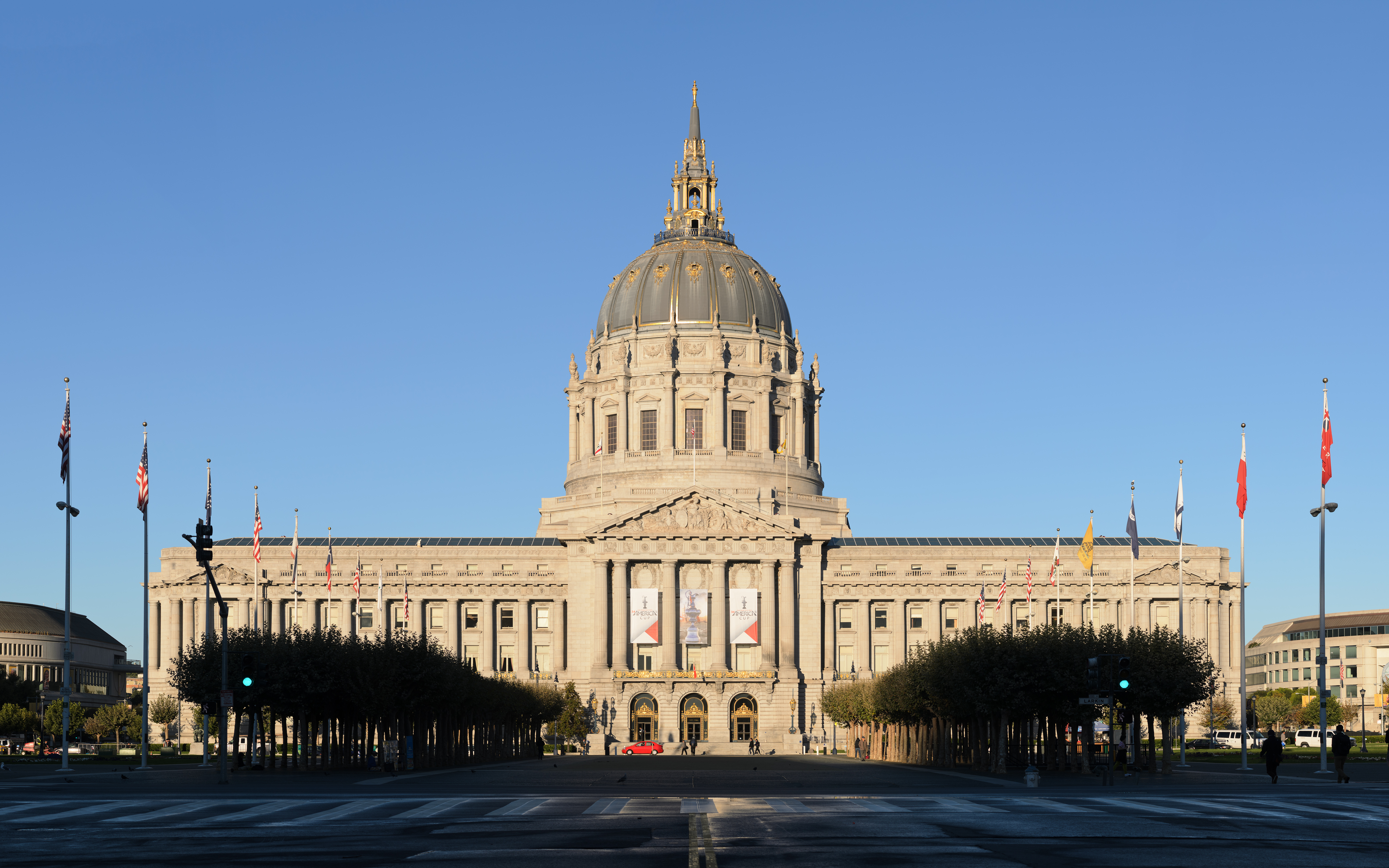
  San Francisco City Hall
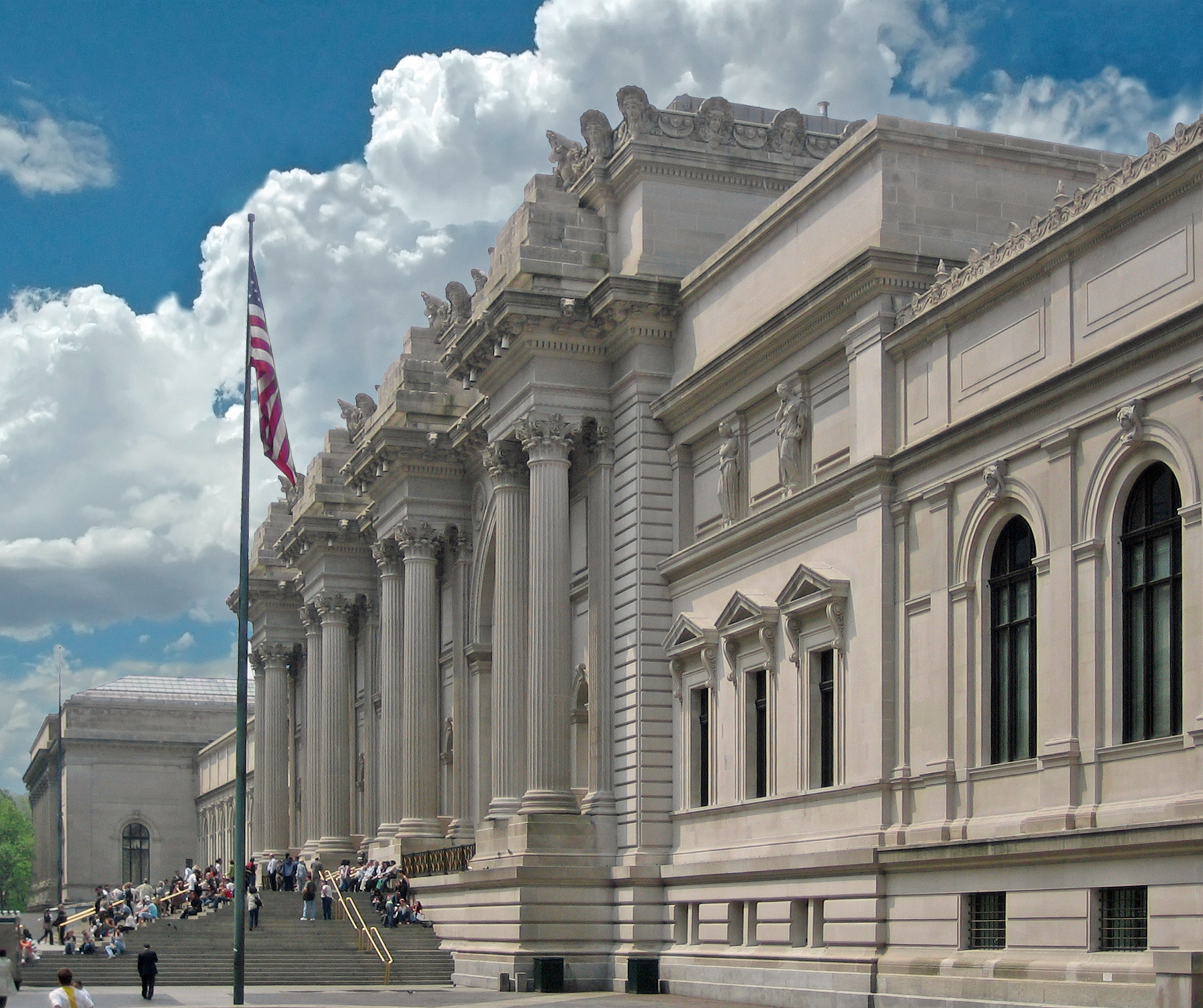
  Metropolitan Museum of Art in New York City
