= Frederick William Vanderbilt =

19th and 20th-century American businessman

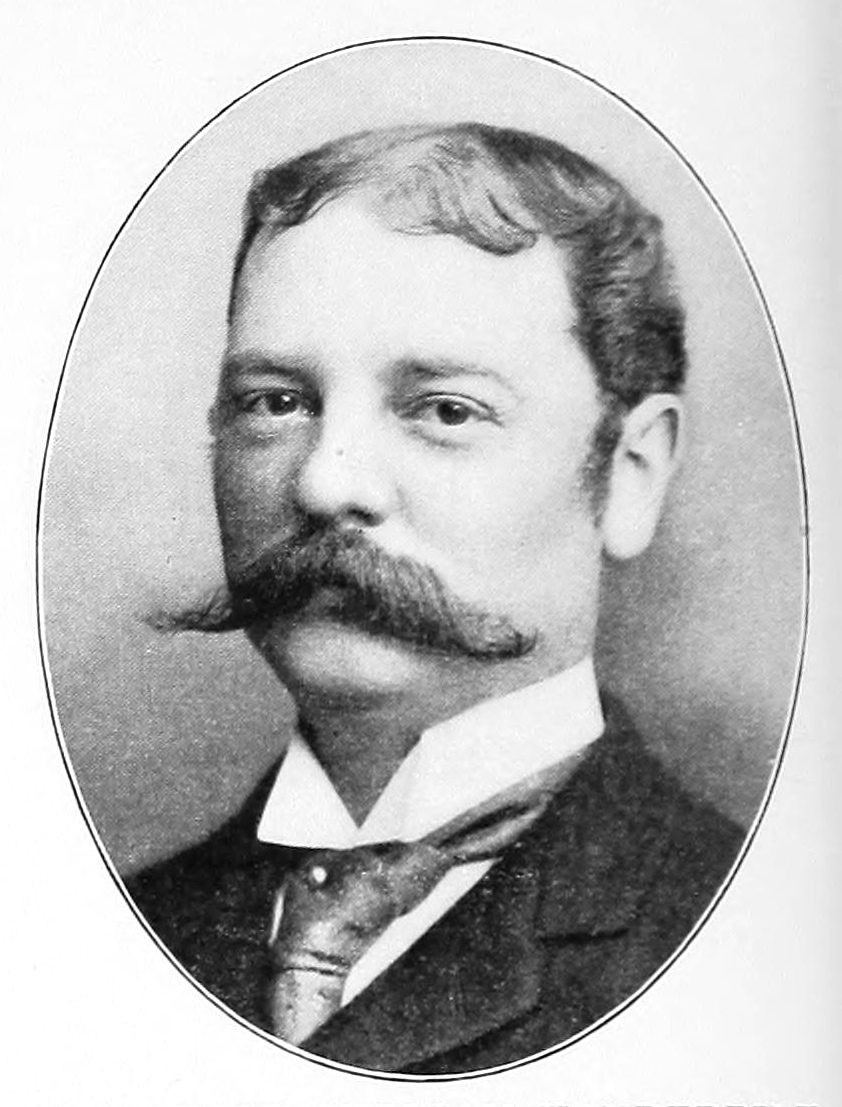
- Born: February 2, 1856; New Dorp, NY
- Died: June 29, 1938 (aged 82); Hyde Park, New York
- Resting place: Moravian Cemetery
- Education: Yale University
- Spouse: Louise Holmes Anthony (m. 1878; died 1926)
- Parent(s): William Henry Vanderbilt; Maria Louisa Kissam
- Relatives: Margaret Van Alen (niece)
- Family: Vanderbilt

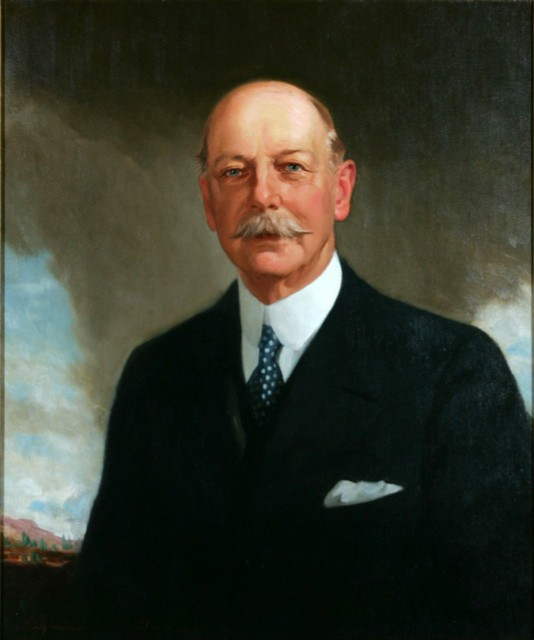
F. W. Vanderbilt, circa 1913, painted by Raymond P. R. Neilson.

Frederick William Vanderbilt (February 2, 1856 – June 29, 1938) was a member of the American Vanderbilt family. He was a director of the New York Central Railroad for 61 years, and also a director of the Pittsburgh and Lake Erie Railroad and of the Chicago and North Western Railroad.

== Early life ==
Vanderbilt was born on February 2, 1856, in New Dorp, Staten Island. He was the third son of eight children born to William Henry Vanderbilt (1821–1885) and Maria Louisa (née Kissam) Vanderbilt (1821–1896). His siblings were Cornelius Vanderbilt II, who married Alice Claypoole Gwynne; Margaret Louisa Vanderbilt, who married Elliott Fitch Shepard; William Kissam Vanderbilt, who married Alva Erskine Smith and Anne Harriman Sands Rutherfurd; Emily Thorn Vanderbilt, who married William Douglas Sloane and Henry White; Florence Adele Vanderbilt, who married Hamilton McKown Twombly; Eliza Osgood Vanderbilt, who married William Seward Webb; and George Washington Vanderbilt II, who married Edith Stuyvesant Dresser.

He was the grandson of Commodore Cornelius Vanderbilt, who first created the Vanderbilt family's wealth. Upon his grandfather's death in 1877, 95% of the $100 million estate was left to his father and his three brothers ($5 million to Cornelius, and $2 million apiece to William, Frederick, and George).

In 1876, Vanderbilt graduated from Yale University's Sheffield Scientific School to which he later donated $500,000 (equivalent to $18,605,769 today) in 1902. While at Yale, he joined St. Anthony Hall and paid for a new chapter house and dormitory.

== Career ==
After graduating from Yale, he joined his father at the New York Central Railroad, like his brothers, working in one department after another to gain an understanding of the railroad business. After working for many years at the railroad, he devoted his time to travel and yachting.

Vanderbilt was a director of 22 railroads, including New York Central Railroad, the Pittsburgh and Lake Erie Railroad, and the Chicago and North Western Railroad.

== Yachts ==
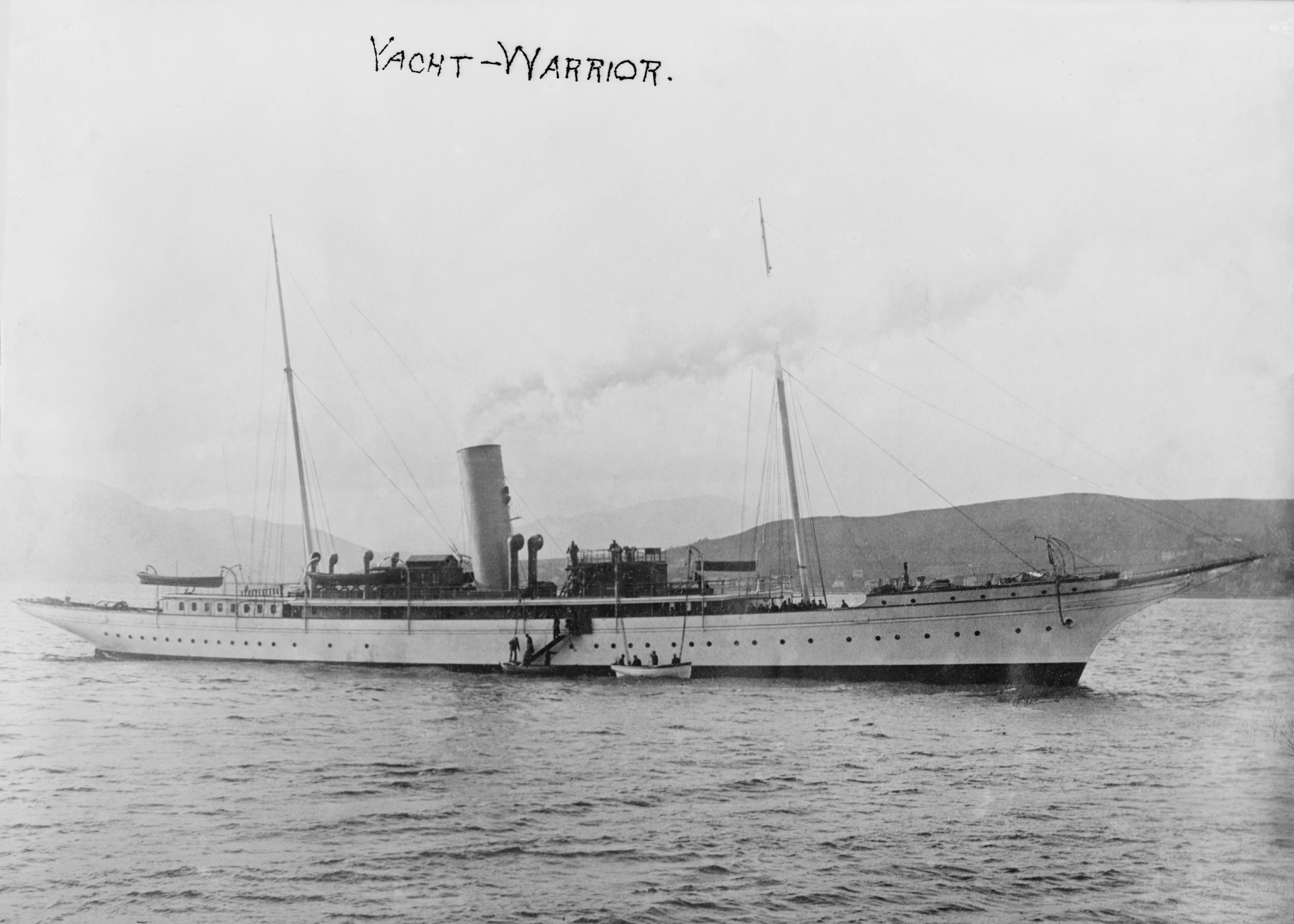
Warrior in 1910

Vanderbilt was a member of the New York Yacht Club. In the course of his life he owned four steam yachts: Vedette, Conqueror, Warrior, and Virginia, which he renamed Vedette after his first yacht. In January 1914 Warrior, his largest yacht, ran aground on the Colombian coast while on a Caribbean cruise. Mr and Mrs Vanderbilt were rescued, along with their guests: the Duke and Duchess of Manchester and Lord Falconer; and their servants. There was no loss of life, and Warrior was eventually salvaged.

== Legacy ==
Vanderbilt maintained residences in New York City (he lived for a while at 450 Fifth Avenue), Newport ("Rough Point"), Bar Harbor ("Sonogee"), Upper St. Regis Lake in the Adirondacks ("Pine Tree Point"), and a country palace in Hyde Park, New York ("Hyde Park") now preserved by the National Park Service as Vanderbilt Mansion National Historic Site. He built the nearby Howard Mansion and Carriage House for his nephew Thomas H. Howard in 1896.

Vanderbilt was the owner of 10 East 40th Street in Manhattan, a prominent example of art deco architecture, until his death. He commissioned a number of campus buildings at Yale University by architect Charles C. Haight that survive to this day, from campus dormitories comprising the present-day Silliman College, to Vanderbilt Hall, Phelps Hall, the Mason, Sloane and Osborn laboratories, and his secret society, St. Anthony Hall.

== Personal life ==
In 1878, Frederick married Louise Holmes Torrance (née Anthony) (1854–1926), the daughter of Charles Lee Anthony and Catherine (née Holmes) Anthony. Louise's father was a successful dry-goods merchant in New York City. Louise had been previously married, in 1868, to Frederick's cousin Alfred Torrance, before their divorce in 1877.

Frederick Vanderbilt died in Hyde Park, New York, on June 29, 1938. He was buried at Vanderbilt Family Cemetery and Mausoleum in New Dorp. His estate was valued at $79,845,478 (equivalent to $1,747,748,868 today) upon his death. He left $5,200,000 to the Sheffield Scientific School, $3,900,000 to Vanderbilt University, $1,300,000 to the Salvation Army, and $650,000 to the New York Association for Improving the Condition of the Poor. After his charitable donations, his niece, Mrs. Margaret Louise Van Alen (1876–1969), was the chief heir of his estate, receiving his 5th Avenue home, Hyde Park home, and 25% of the residue of the estate.
