= Vanderbilt Mansion National Historic Site =

Mansion in Hyde Park, New York

- U.S. National Register of Historic Places
- U.S. Historic district
- U.S. National Historic Site
- New York State Register of Historic Places
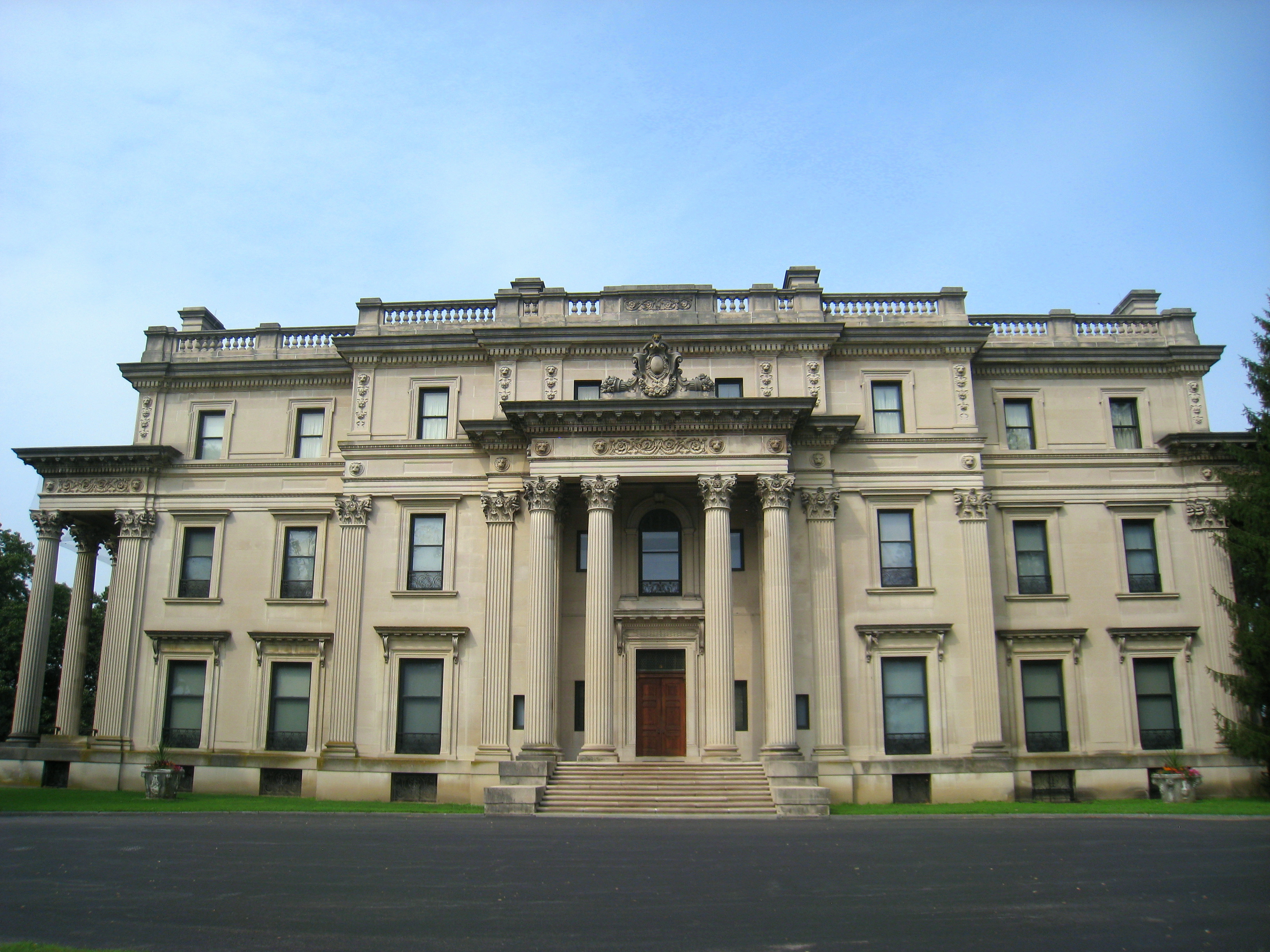
- East facade and main entrance

- Location within New York Location within the United States
- Location: Hyde Park, New York
- Coordinates: 41°47′46″N 73°56′31″W
- Area: 211 acres (85 ha)
- Built: 1896–99
- Architects: McKim, Mead & White, Robert H. Robertson
- Architectural style: Beaux-Arts
- Visitation: 295,040 (2025)
- Website: Vanderbilt Mansion National Historic Site
- NRHP reference No.: 66000059
- NYSRHP No.: 02707.000015

Significant dates
- Added to NRHP: October 15, 1966
- Designated HD: October 15, 1966
- Designated NHS: December 18, 1940
- Designated NYSRHP: June 23, 1980

Vanderbilt Mansion National Historic Site is a historic house museum in Hyde Park, New York, United States. Designated a National Historic Site in 1940, it is owned and operated by the National Park Service.

The property, historically known as Hyde Park, was one of several homes owned by Frederick William Vanderbilt and his wife Louise Holmes Anthony. The 54-room Vanderbilt mansion was designed by the preeminent architectural firm McKim, Mead & White. It was built between 1896 and 1899. The house is an example of the Beaux-Arts architecture style. The interiors are archetypes of the American Renaissance, blending European architectural salvage, antiques, and fine period reproductions representing an array of historical styles. The site includes 211 acres (85 ha) of the original larger property (once around 600 acres) situated on a bluff overlooking the Hudson River and includes manicured lawns, formal gardens, woodlands, and numerous auxiliary buildings.

== History ==
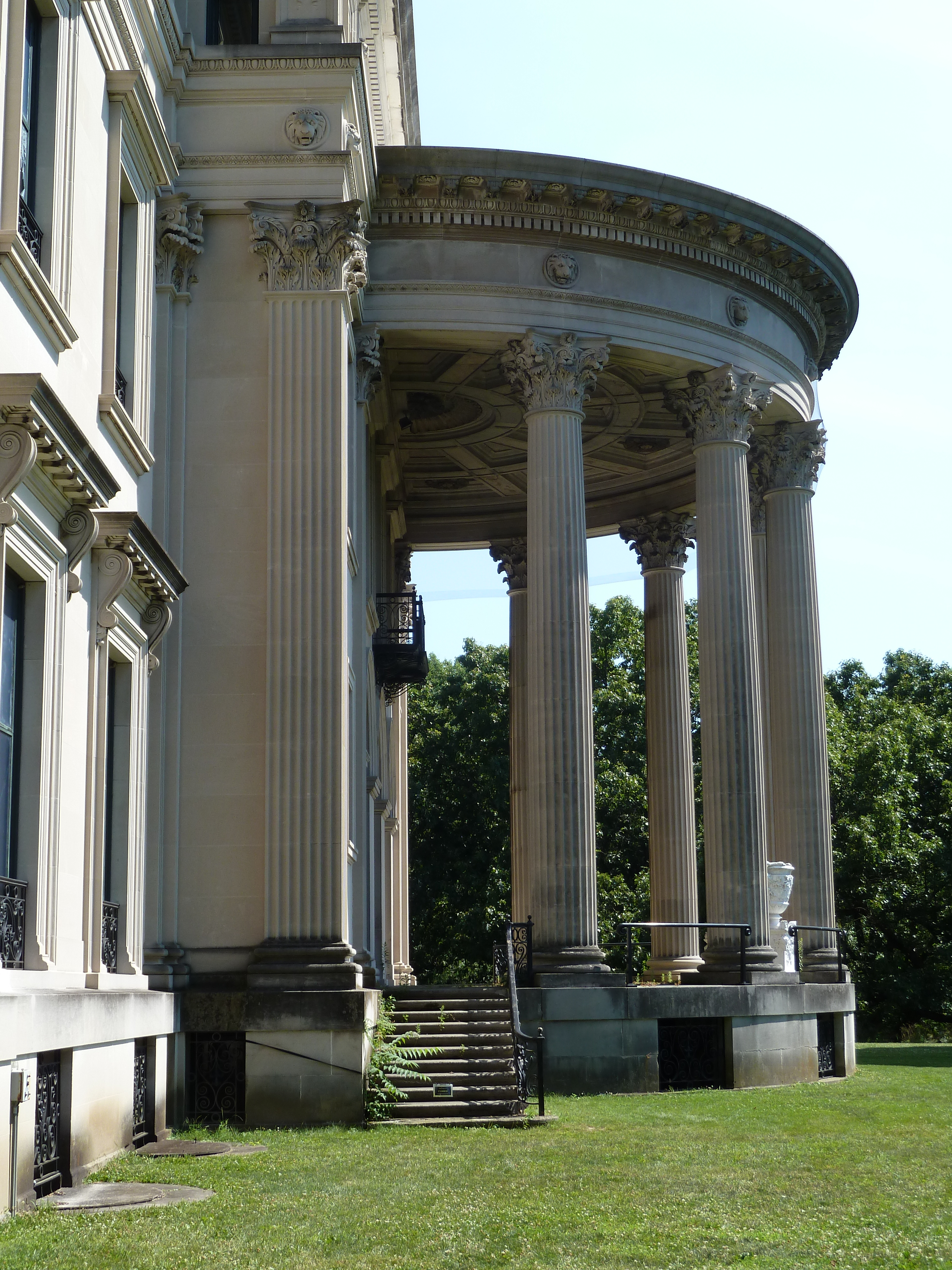
West portico

Historically known as Hyde Park, the Vanderbilt Mansion National Historic Site is one of the area's oldest Hudson River estates. The earliest development of the estate began in 1764 when Dr. John Bard purchased land on the east side of the Albany Post Road, where he built Red House and developed the agricultural aspects of the eastern section of the property that continued through Frederick and Louise Vanderbilt's occupancy. Bard family ownership continued through 1821 with his son, Dr. Samuel Bard (1742–1821), owning the property from 1799 to 1821. In 1828, Dr. David Hosack, president of the New York Horticultural Society, purchased the property from Samuel Bard's heirs, with André Parmentier helping to design the grounds. In 1840, John Jacob Astor purchased the property from Hosack's heirs for his daughter Dorothea and her husband Walter S. Langdon. Their son Walter inherited and occupied the estate to the time of his death in 1894.

Frederick and Louise Vanderbilt purchased Hyde Park in May 1895 from Langdon's heirs. Attracted to the Hudson Valley and the land on the east bank of the Hudson River, Frederick and his wife settled into their 600-acre (240 ha) estate. The location offered quick and easy access to New York City on the Vanderbilt's own New York Central Railroad. The house was designed and built between 1896 and 1899, and was primarily used as a vacation home for Frederick Vanderbilt's family. The previous owners of the estate had made it well known for its grand landscape and array of different plants and trees throughout the property. The New York Times described the Vanderbilt's estate as "the finest place on the Hudson between New York and Albany."

Their niece, Margaret "Daisy" Van Alen, inherited the property when Frederick Vanderbilt died in 1938. Encouraged by President Franklin D. Roosevelt (who owned an estate nearby), Van Alen donated a portion of the estate, including the residence with most of its original furnishings, to the National Park Service in 1940. From 1941 to 1943, Roosevelt's Secret Service was housed in the basement and third-floor service areas, and some of the President's personal White House staff and friends occasionally stayed in the main bedrooms of the house, including those of Frederick and Louise Vanderbilt.

== Mansion ==
Mansion

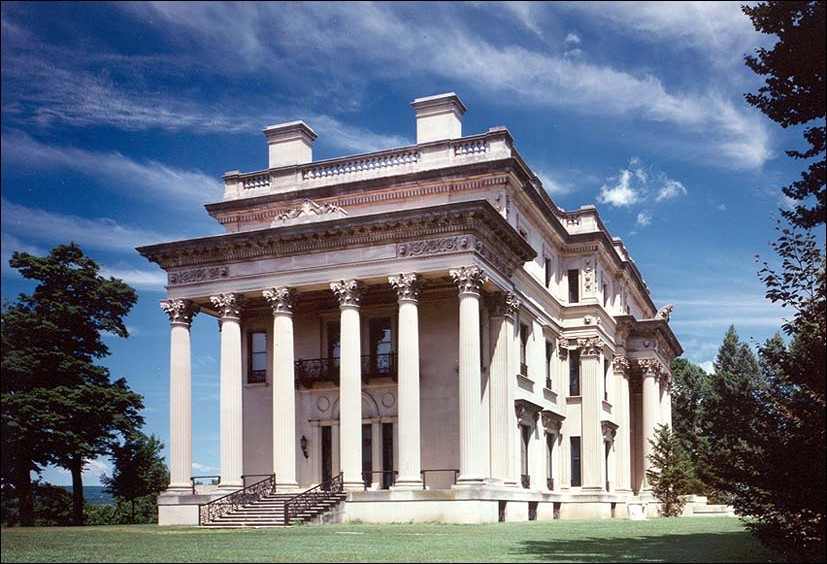
South portico

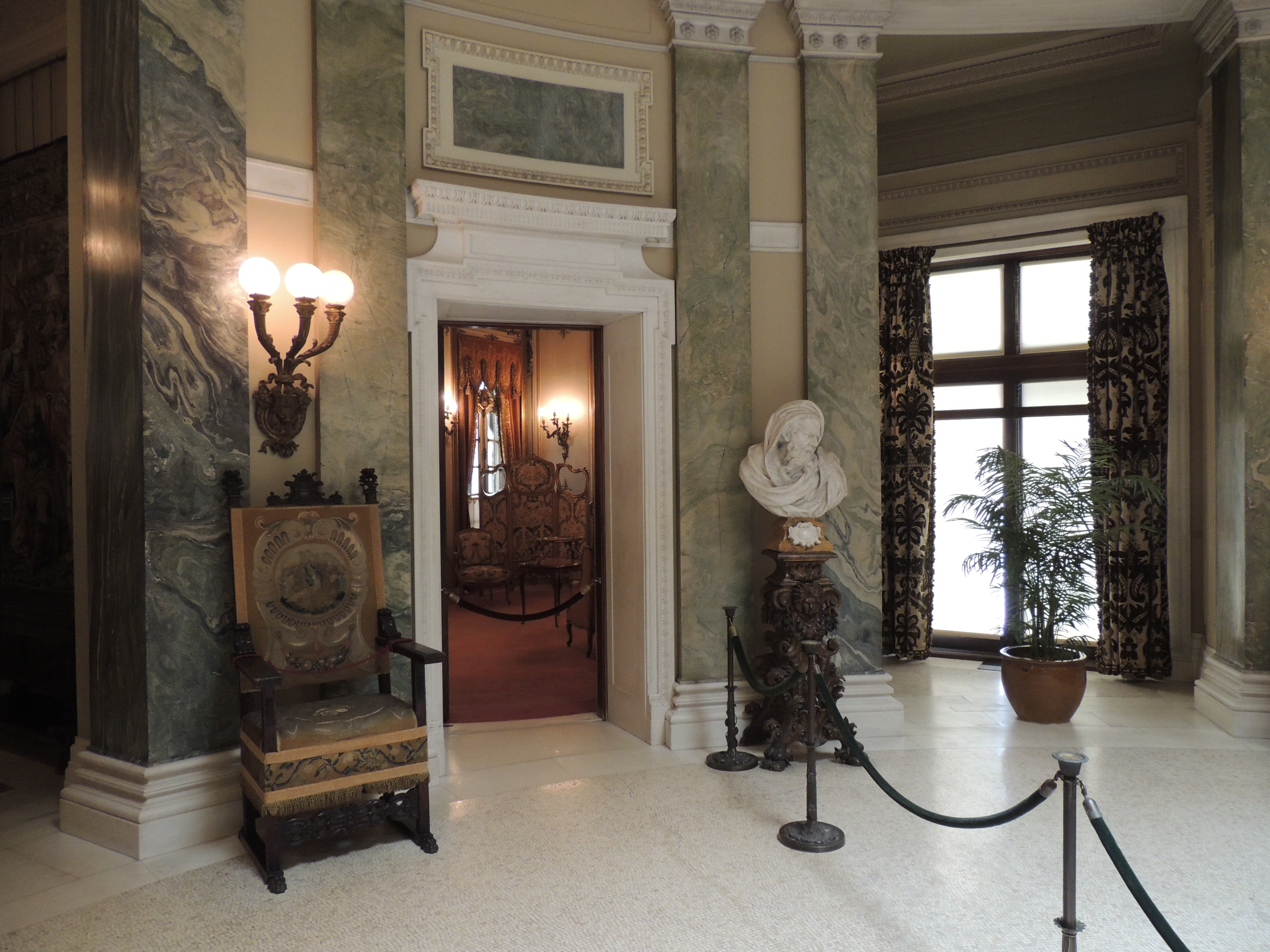
Interior

The 54-room mansion is the work of the architectural firm McKim, Mead & White. Charles Follen McKim designed the plan in the Beaux-Arts style and Stanford White assisted as an antiques buyer.

The house has a classic Beaux-Arts plan, with the major public rooms on its ground floor – the central Elliptical Hall, Dining Room, and Living Room – all in one line, parallel to the Hudson River. North and South Foyers provide transitional space from the Hall to the Dining Room and Living Room. Five secondary spaces are located off the Elliptical Hall: the Lobby, Den, Gold Room, Grand Stair Hall, and Lavatory. The second floor rooms, comprising Mrs. Vanderbilt's suite of Bedroom, Boudoir and Bathroom (designed by Ogden Codman), Mr. Vanderbilt's Bedroom and Bathroom, Guest Bedrooms and Baths and the Linen Room, are disposed around the Second Floor Hall and the North and South Foyers. The third floor contains five additional guest bedrooms, and a Servants' Hall separated from the guests' rooms by a door at the main staircase. Supported by both concrete and steel, the Vanderbilt mansion was considered modern for its time. The mansion also included plumbing and forced hot air central heating and electric lighting which was powered by a hydroelectric plant built on the estate on the Crum Elbow stream. The Vanderbilt estate had electric lighting before the surrounding area.

Herter Brothers and A. H. Davenport and Company were subcontractors who executed McKim's interior designs. The Vanderbilts also hired Georges Glaenzer and Ogden Codman to decorate several rooms. E.F. Caldwell & Co. manufactured the majority of the lighting.

The furniture throughout the mansion was in the style of the late 19th to 20th century and were largely reproductions. Upon assessment, it was concluded that "the Vanderbilts and their decorators [did] not appear to have been interested in the genuineness of the antiques, but rather in creating an effect suggesting the grandness of antique styles." Many of the high quality reproductions of French pieces came from the P. Sormani firm in Paris. The upholstery collection was "considered one of the finest of the 'Gilded Age' in [the country]."

A 1992 assessment report of the mansion funded by the National Park Service found that some of the furniture had undergone significant damage due to the fluctuating environment in the mansion as well as the presence of dermestids. Intense UV, heavily fluctuating humidity levels, and heat exposure are the main causes of fabric and upholstery breakdown in the furniture throughout the mansion. Provenance of European antiques assessed in the mansion was difficult because many of the pieces were found to be fake or combinations of new and old parts. The third floor of the mansion was reported to be in much better condition than the rest of the mansion and as such it was recommended that the floor be closed off to the public and opened only be request to special researchers. Linseed oil was noted to have destroyed much of the gilding that was at one time in good condition.

== Carriage house ==
Carriage house and gardens

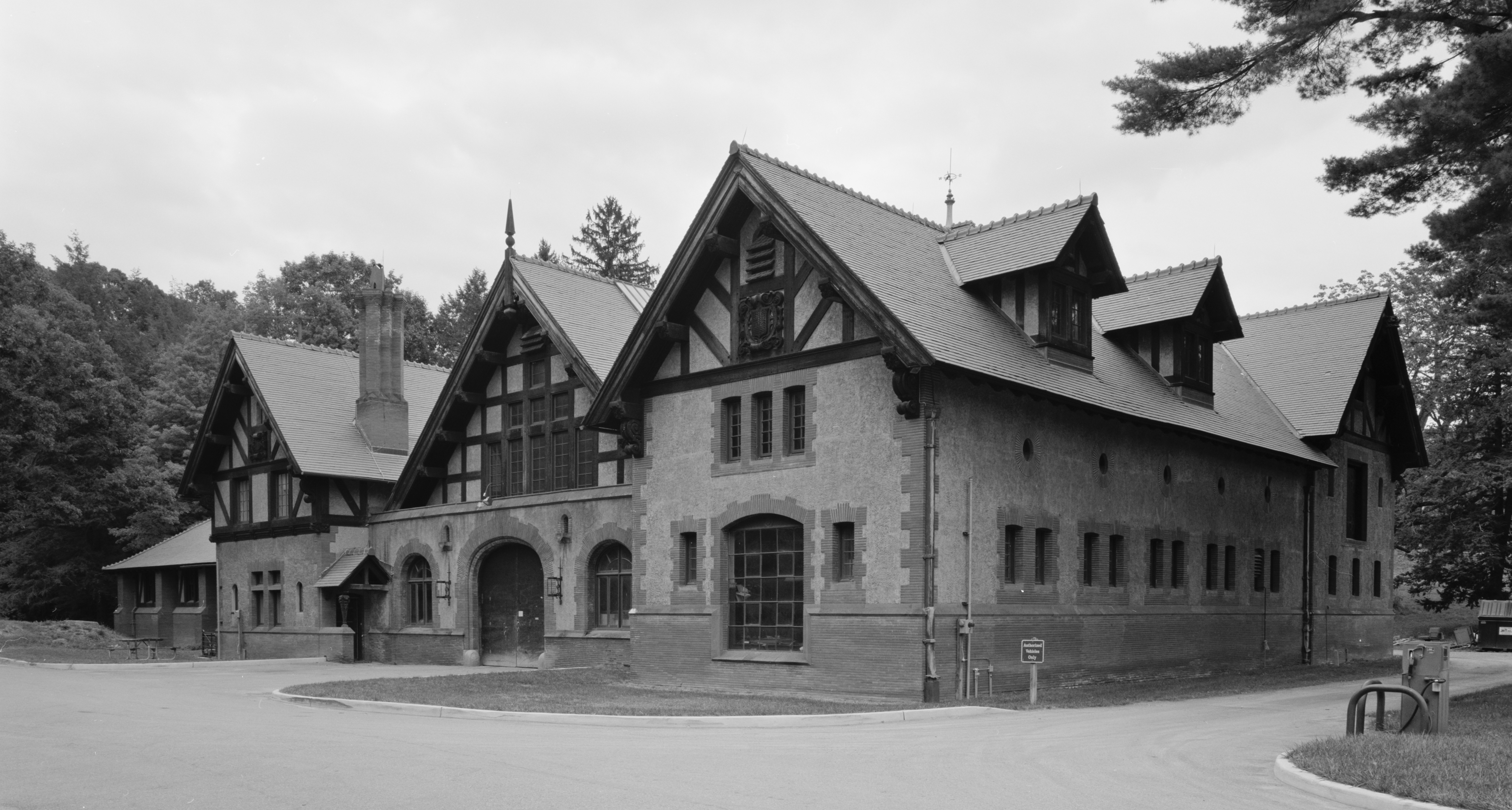
Carriage house

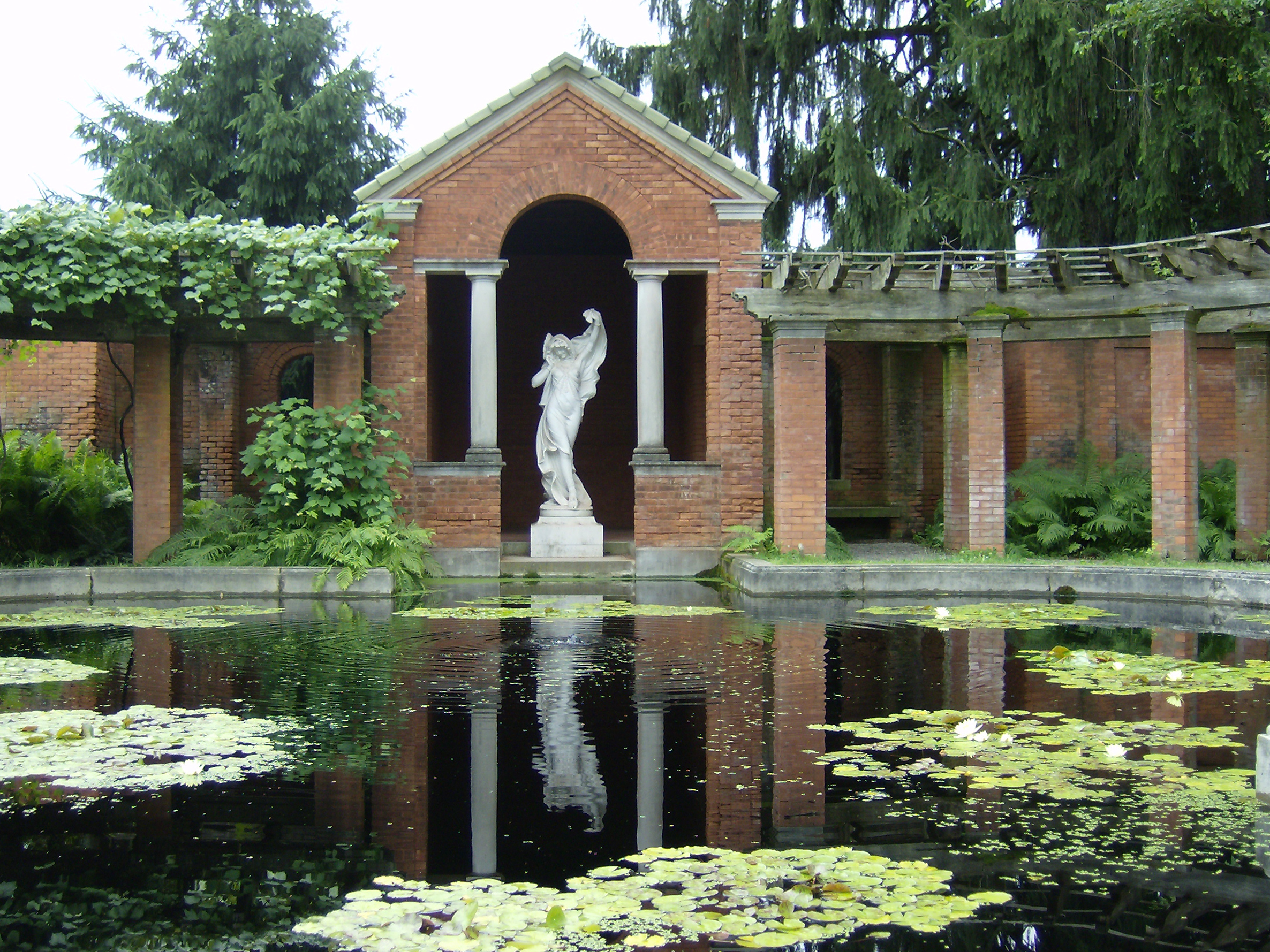
Gardens

When the Vanderbilts decided to replace cowbarns that dotted their extensive property, the couple chose Robert H. Robertson, a prominent architect who also designed Shelburne Farms, home of Frederick Vanderbilt's sister, Eliza Osgood Vanderbilt Webb. Robertson's coach house, completed in the Queen Anne style, is in vast contrast to stoic mansion.

== Gardens ==
The Italian gardens are detached from the house and incorporated formal elements typical of the Italian style. This meant that the beds were arranged in such a way that if you drew a line across the middle, either horizontally or vertically, one side of the line would mirror the other side. These formal gardens also consisted of multiple tiers, which depended on the type of plants. Each level was different. Frederick himself added the rose garden which contained almost 2000 vintage rose bushes along with other kinds of roses.

== See also ==
- List of Gilded Age mansions
- List of national historic sites and historical parks of the United States
- National Register of Historic Places listings in Dutchess County, New York
