= Vivian Francis Bulkeley-Johnson =

British aide-de-camp (1891 – 1968)

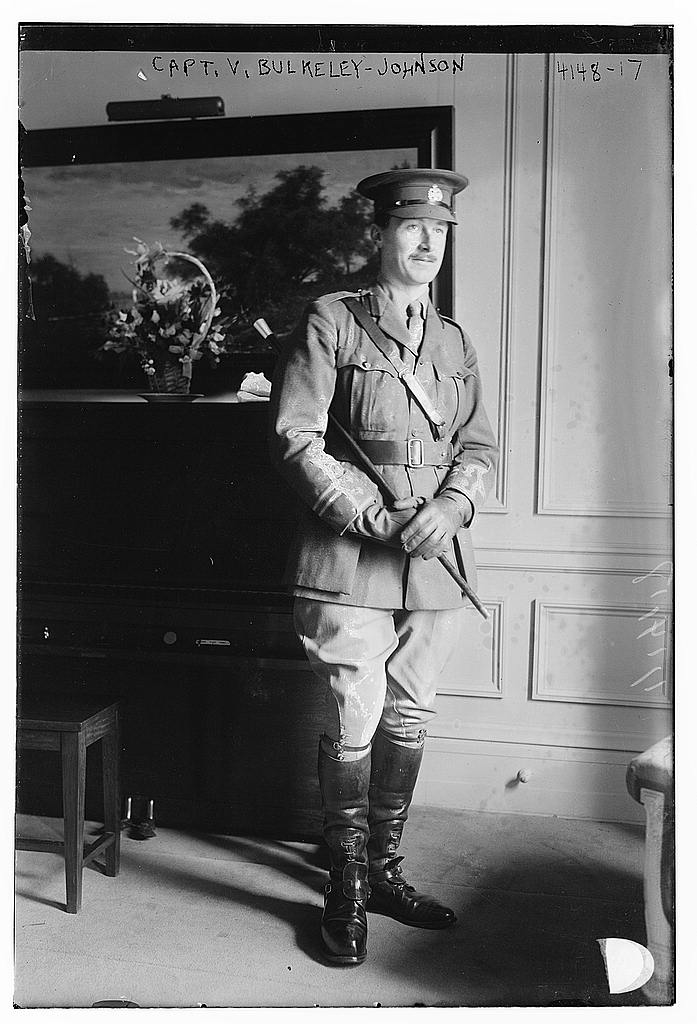
- Vivian Bulkeley-Johnson in 1917
- Born: 15 January 1891; Belgravia, England
- Died: 14 February 1968 (aged 76); England
- Education: Balliol College, Oxford
- Spouses: Siriol Penelope Diana Katherine Williams-Bulkeley (m. 1924; div. 1947) Cornelia Stuyvesant Vanderbilt (m. 1949)

Vivian Francis Bulkeley-Johnson (15 January 1891 – 14 February 1968) was the aide-de-camp to Victor Cavendish, 9th Duke of Devonshire, the Governor General of Canada from 1916 to 1918. He served in the offices of the Imperial War Cabinet in World War I from 1918 to 1919, and in the Air Ministry from 1919 to 1922.

== Early life ==
Bulkeley-Johnson, who was affectionately known as BJ, was born on 15 January 1891 in Belgravia, England. He was the only son born to Francis Head Bulkeley-Johnson, an English barrister, and Helen Percy Stoughton.

His maternal grandparents were Charles William Stoughton of Ballynoe in County Kerry, Ireland, and Percy Georgina Laura (née Gosset) Stoughton. His great-grandfather, Thomas Anthony Stoughton of Owlpen Park, was the High Sheriff of Gloucestershire.

Bulkeley-Johnson was educated at Eton College and Balliol College, Oxford.

== Career ==
In 1912, he gazetted to the 2nd Battalion Rifle Brigade and then served in India from April 1914 to September 1914, followed by service on the Western Front in France during World War I, from November 1914 until March 1915, where he was wounded at Neuve-Chapelle on 10 March 1915, during the Battle of Neuve Chapelle in which it was captured, not for the first time, by the IV and I Indian Corps. Bulkeley-Johnson was gazetted Captain on 5 October 1915.

Following his recovery, he served at General Headquarters for the Home Forces from April to November 1916. From 1916 to 1918, he was one of three aide-de-camps who came from England. Bulkeley-Johnson, then 25, was aide-de-camp to Victor Cavendish, 9th Duke of Devonshire, the Governor General of Canada. He served in the offices of the Imperial War Cabinet for World War I from 1918 to 1919, and in the Air Ministry from 1919 to 1922.

From 1922 until 1930, he worked as the London agent for cotton merchants, and from 1930 until 1952, Bulkeley-Johnson, then a "distinguished-looking gentlemen with a disabled leg", was a banker in London where he looked after the charitable activities of the Rothschild Bank.

== Personal life ==
On 11 June 1924, he married Siriol Penelope Diana Katherine Williams-Bulkeley, daughter of Sir Richard Williams-Bulkeley, 12th Baronet, who served as the Lord Lieutenant of Anglesey from 1896 until 1942, and Lady Magdalen Yorke. Siriol's maternal grandfather was Charles Yorke, 5th Earl of Hardwicke and her uncle was Albert Yorke, 6th Earl of Hardwicke, the bachelor Under-Secretary of State for India from 1900 to 1902. They divorced in 1947.

On 13 October 1949, he married the divorced American heiress, Cornelia Stuyvesant Vanderbilt in a brief ceremony at the Kensington registry office in London, and remained married to her until his death. Cornelia was the daughter of George Washington Vanderbilt II and Edith Stuyvesant Dresser and the mother of George Henry Vanderbilt Cecil and William Amherst Vanderbilt Cecil from her previous marriage to John Francis Amherst Cecil, the first secretary of the British Embassy in Washington, who was the son of Lord William Cecil and Mary Cecil, Baroness Amherst of Hackney.

From his second marriage, he became incredibly wealthy and lived in a four-story brick home in Kensington, and on a 240-acre farm in the village of Churchill northwest of Oxford, known as the Mount, where he "took an interest in inland waterways, running a company that operated boats on the Oxford and other canals". Bulkeley-Johnson died on 14 February 1968 in England.

=== Legacy ===
Bulkeley-Johnson was a collector of Chinese art which included a "series of ceramic wares ranging from the Neolithic period to the Ch'ing dynasty". Upon his death, he donated his collection to the Mount Trust Collection of Chinese Art at the Victoria and Albert Museum. A major part of his estate was given to his alma mater, Balliol College, which named its new accommodation building 'Staircase XXII' after him.
