= George Warren Dresser =

American soldier and civil engineer

- Born: September 15, 1837; Abington, Connecticut, U.S.
- Died: May 27, 1883 (aged 45); Newport, Rhode Island, U.S.
- Education: United States Military Academy
- Spouse: Susan Fish LeRoy (m. 1863; died 1883)
- Children: Susan LeRoy Dresser; Daniel LeRoy Dresser; Natalie Bayard Dresser; Edith Stuyvesant Dresser; Pauline Georgine Dresser
- Parent(s): George Andrew Dresser; Hannah W. Brown Dresser

Major George Warren Dresser (September 15, 1837 – May 27, 1883) was an American soldier and civil engineer who was prominent in New York and Newport society.

== Early life ==
Dresser was born on September 15, 1837, at Abington, Connecticut. He was a son of attorney George Andrew Dresser (1814–1891) and Hannah W. (née Brown) Dresser (1814–1855), who married in August 1835. His father, who was originally from Brooklyn, New York, was connected with the Queens Insurance Company of London. Among his siblings were Charles Andrew Dresser, William Clark Dresser, Jacqueline Dresser, Mary L. (née Dresser) Randall, and Frances (née Dresser) Smith.

His paternal grandparents were Samuel Dresser and Dorothy (née Ingalls) Dresser. The Dresser family first settled in America in Rowley, Massachusetts, in spring 1639 with Rev. Ezekiel Rogers and sixty other families. His maternal grandparents were Clark Brown and Sally (née Sherman) Brown.

In July 1856, he was appointed to a cadetship in the United States Military Academy at West Point from Massachusetts.

== Career ==
On May 6, 1861, immediately after his graduation from the Military Academy, Dresser was commissioned Second lieutenant of the 4th U.S. Artillery, where he spent two months drilling new recruits for the Union Army. During the Civil War, he entered the Manassas campaign as first lieutenant and was involved in the Battle of Bull Run and in the defense of Washington. In March 1862, he entered the Peninsula campaign and was assigned to engineer duty at the siege of Yorktown.

For two months, he was acting Ordnance Officer of the Third Army Corps, and from September 1862 until August 1862, he was Assistant Instructor of Artillery Tactics at West Point. Later in 1862, he was assigned to engineer duty and the command of his company, the 4th Regiment of Artillery, at Chattanooga, Tennessee. In July 1864, he was appointed inspector of the 5th Army Corps, holding the post until March 1865. For the next four months, he served with General William Farrar Smith in New Orleans.

Dresser was brevetted captain in August 1864 for "gallant services during the operations on the Weldon (Virginia) Railroad", and Major in March 1865 for "good conduct and gallant services during the rebellion." He resigned on October 13, 1865.

=== Engineering career ===
After he resigned from the military, he started practicing as a civil engineer where he surveyed Block Island breakwater (which were constructed in 1870 to form what is known as "Old Harbor") and the defense of Narragansett Bay in 1866 to 1868. He also served as resident engineer of the Harlem River and Port Chester Railroad, chief engineer of the Wickford Branch Railroad, and assistant engineer in the New York Department of Public Works.

From 1870 to 1873, he worked on the Croton Aqueduct from 92nd Street to 113th Street. In October 1875, he began serving as editor of the American Gas Light Journal and retained this position until his death in 1883. Dresser was described as "a very enthusiastic member of the American Society of Civil Engineers, and took and active interest in the discussions of papers, and also in its annual conventions." He was also involved with Fort Adams in Newport.

== Personal life ==
On April 21, 1863, Dresser was married to Susan Fish LeRoy (1834–1883). Susan, a daughter of Daniel LeRoy and Susan Elizabeth (née Fish) LeRoy, was the niece of Hamilton Fish, a former U.S. Secretary of State, U.S. Senator, and New York Governor, and the granddaughter of Nicholas Fish, the Adjutant General of New York and a close friend of Alexander Hamilton. Through the Fish family, she was a descendant of Peter Stuyvesant, the last Director-General of New Netherland. Together, they were the parents of:

- Susan LeRoy Dresser (1864–1960), who married Viscount Romain Le Boeuf d'Osmoy of Paris in June 1899.
- Daniel LeRoy Dresser (1866–1915), who married Emma Louise Burnham.
- Natalie Bayard Dresser (1869–1950), who married John Nicholas Brown I, a son of John Carter Brown, in 1897.
- Edith Stuyvesant Dresser (1873–1958), who married Vanderbilt heir George Washington Vanderbilt II, builder of the Biltmore Estate. After his death in 1914, she married Peter Goelet Gerry, a U.S. Senator from Rhode Island.
- Pauline Georgine Warren Dresser (1876–1975), who married Rev. George Grenville Merrill in December 1897. Merrill was an Episcopal clergyman and served as rector of parishes in Tuxedo Park and Buffalo, New York, and Stockbridge, Massachusetts.

His wife died at their home in New York City on April 4, 1883. The following month, Dresser died at the "Reitz cottage" on John Street in Newport on May 27, 1883. After a funeral at Trinity Church, he was buried at Island Cemetery in Newport. At his funeral, the city of New York was represented by then Mayor Franklin Edson. (Note: The pallbearers at his funeral were Major Throckmorton, Captain Morris, Captain C.C. Churchill, Mr. A. Smith (Superintendent), and Mr. V. Smith (engineer of the Manhattan Gas Works), Mr. Greenough (engineer of the Boston Gas Light Company), Captain F. A. Judson, Mr. Edward A. Crocker, Mr. W. D. King, and Mr. H. A. Bentley.) After their deaths, the children were raised by Susan's mother.

=== Descendants ===
Through his daughter Edith, he was posthumously a grandfather of Cornelia Stuyvesant Vanderbilt (1900–1976), who married John Francis Amherst Cecil, son of Lord William Cecil and Mary Tyssen-Amherst, 2nd Baroness Amherst of Hackney.

Through his daughter Natalie, he was a grandfather of John Nicholas Brown II (1900–1979), who was dubbed the "richest baby in America" after the death of his father and uncle within months of each other. Brown later became the Assistant Secretary of the Navy under President Harry S. Truman.
