= BOAC Flight 777 =

1943 airliner shootdown incident

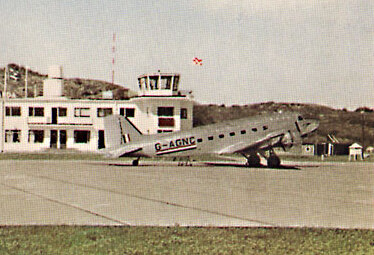
- A BOAC Douglas DC-3-194, similar to the aircraft involved

Accident
- Date: 1 June 1943
- Summary: Attacked by eight German Junkers Ju 88 bombers of KG 40, crashed into the sea
- Site: Bay of Biscay, off the coast of Spain and France; 46°07′N 10°15′W

Aircraft
- Aircraft type: Douglas DC-3-194
- Aircraft name: Ibis
- Operator: British Overseas Airways Corporation (aircraft owned and operated by KLM)
- Registration: G-AGBB
- Flight origin: Lisbon Portela Airport, Portugal
- Destination: Bristol (Whitchurch) Airport, England
- Passengers: 13
- Crew: 4
- Fatalities: 17
- Survivors: 0

BOAC Flight 777 was a KLM flight scheduled as a British Overseas Airways Corporation civilian airline flight from Portela Airport in Lisbon, Portugal, to Whitchurch Airport near Bristol, England. On 1 June 1943, the Douglas DC-3 serving the flight was attacked by eight German Junkers Ju 88 heavy fighter planes and crashed into the Bay of Biscay, killing all 17 on board. There were several notable passengers, among them actor Leslie Howard.

One theory suggests that the Germans attacked the aircraft because they believed that British Prime Minister Winston Churchill was aboard; another suggested that it was targeted because several passengers were British spies, including Howard. During the Second World War, British and German civilian aircraft operated from the same facilities at Portela, and Allied and Axis spies watched the incoming and outgoing traffic. The Lisbon–Whitchurch route frequently carried agents and escaped POWs to Britain.

Aircraft flying the Lisbon–Whitchurch route were left unmolested at the beginning of the war, and both Allied and Axis powers respected the neutrality of Portugal. However, in 1942, the air war had begun to heat up over the Bay of Biscay, north of Spain and off the west coast of France; the Douglas DC-3 lost in this attack had survived attacks by Luftwaffe fighters in November 1942 and April 1943.

== Historical background ==
=== BOAC flights ===
BOAC Flight 777 was shot down over the Bay of Biscay.

When war broke out in Europe, the British Air Ministry prohibited private flying and most domestic air services. Imperial Airways and British Airways Ltd, in the process of being merged and nationalised as British Overseas Airways Corporation, were evacuated from Croydon Aerodrome and Heston Aerodrome to Whitchurch Airport, outside Bristol. After the fall of Norway, and the entry of the Netherlands, Belgium, France, and Italy into the war, only neutral Sweden, Ireland, and Portugal remained as European destinations for BOAC. (Note: The US was just within range of BOAC's Empire flying boats by refuelling in Newfoundland.) Over the UK, civil aircraft were restricted to between 1,000 feet (300 m) and 3,000 feet (910 m) and could fly only during daylight to ease identification. The British government also restricted flights to diplomats, military personnel, VIPs, and those with government approval.

=== KLM aircraft and flight crews escape to England ===
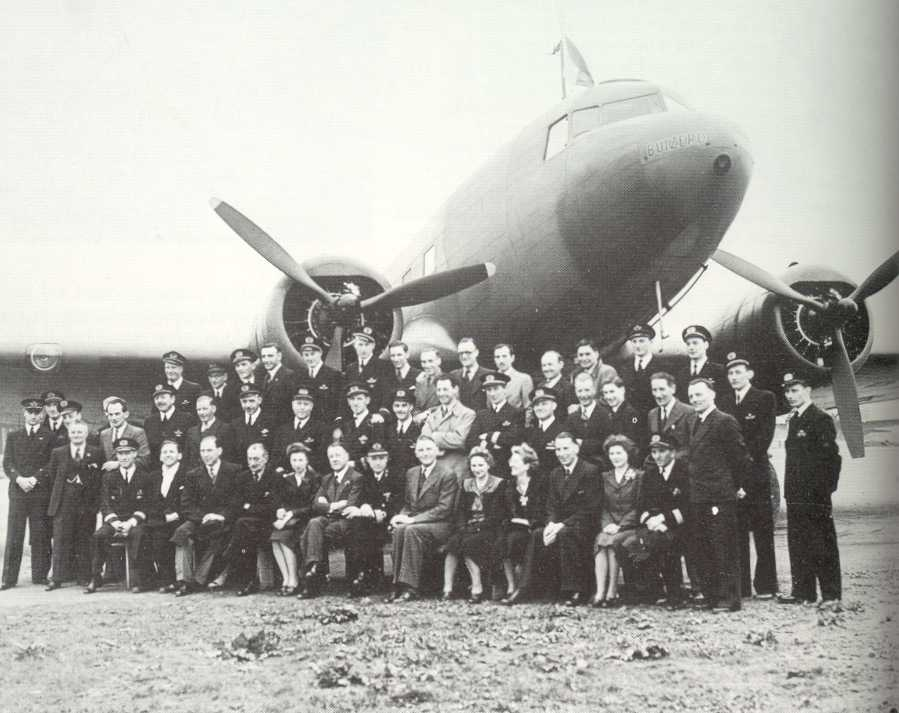
Photo taken by BOAC at Whitchurch to commemorate the 500th flight on the Bristol-Lisbon line on 16 June 1942; the aircraft is the DC-3 G-AGBD/PH-ARB Buizerd (buzzard). The crew of the downed G-AGBB are included (Tepas, middle row, and de Koning, top row, standing, both just left of the left engine propeller blade).

For several weeks prior to the German invasion of the Netherlands, the Dutch airline KLM operated a direct, over-water, twice-weekly DC-3 service from Amsterdam to Portugal, avoiding French, British, and Spanish airspace to connect with the new Pan Am flying boat service from the US to Lisbon. When Germany invaded in May 1940, KLM had several airliners en route outside the Netherlands. (Note: However, Ian Colvin in his book, Flight 777: The Mystery of Leslie Howard, reconstructs the history of the Ibis based on records he reviewed at Schiphol Airport after the war and states the plane was on the tarmac at Schiphol at the time of the invasion and was damaged but somehow survived the attack. Colvin claims the plane was pieced together over the next three days and that the plane and the crew escaped to England on 13 May 1940, reaching Shoreham. The plane was then taken to Ringway where it underwent repairs and received its camouflage paint.) Some managed to fly to Britain, while others stranded east of Italy continued to link British and Dutch territories from Palestine to the Dutch Indies and Australia. The British government interned the Dutch aircraft at Shoreham Airport. After negotiations, the Air Ministry and the Dutch government-in-exile contracted to use the KLM aircraft and crews to replace de Havilland Albatross aircraft on a scheduled service between Britain and Portugal, which BOAC started in June 1940 from Heston Aerodrome.

Initially, a British copilot (carrying a concealed firearm) was included in the crew. After initial reservations about using Dutch crews were overcome, all-Dutch crews were used, although the flights used BOAC flight numbers and passenger handling. The KLM contingent was housed at BOAC's Whitchurch base.

=== Operations ===
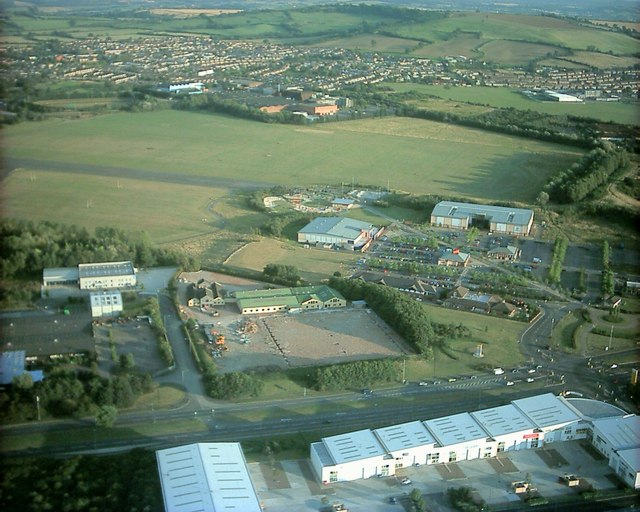
An aerial view of Hengrove Park (2005). Part of the old Whitchurch runway is still visible.

The UK–Lisbon service operated up to four times per week. From 20 September 1940, passengers were flown from Whitchurch (although Heston continued as the London terminus for KLM from 26 June till 20 September 1940), and for Lisbon, the pre-war grass airfield at Sintra was used until October 1942, when the new runway was ready at Portela Airport, on the northern edge of Lisbon. By June 1943, over 500 KLM/BOAC flights had carried 4,000 passengers.

Originally, five Douglas DC-3s and one Douglas DC-2 airliner were available. With the loss of a DC-3 on 20 September 1940 in a landing accident at Heston, and the destruction of another DC-3 in November 1940 by Luftwaffe bombing at Whitchurch, only four aircraft remained: DC-2 G-AGBH Edelvalk (ex-PH-ALE), DC-3 G-AGBD Buizerd (ex-PH-ARB), DC-3 G-AGBE Zilverreiger (ex-PH-ARZ), and DC-3 G-AGBB Ibis (ex-PH-ALI). In 1939, with war tensions in Europe increasing, KLM had painted their DC-2s and DC-3s bright orange to mark them clearly as civilian aircraft. BOAC repainted the aircraft in camouflage, with British civil markings and red/white/blue stripes like all BOAC aircraft, but without the Union Flag. They were later marked with their Dutch bird names under the cockpit windows. The interiors remained in KLM colours and markings.

British and German civilian aircraft operated from the same facilities at Portela, and Allied and Axis spies, including British, German, Soviet, and American, watched the traffic. This was especially the case for the Lisbon–Whitchurch route, which frequently carried agents and escaped POWs to Britain. German spies were posted at terminals to record who boarded and departed flights on the Lisbon–Whitchurch route. Harry Pusey, BOAC's operations officer in Lisbon between 1943 and 1944, described the area as "like Casablanca [the film], but twentyfold." According to CIA archives: "Most OSS operatives in Spain were handled out of Lisbon under nonofficial cover because the diplomatic staff in Madrid made a practice of identifying intelligence agents to the Spanish police."

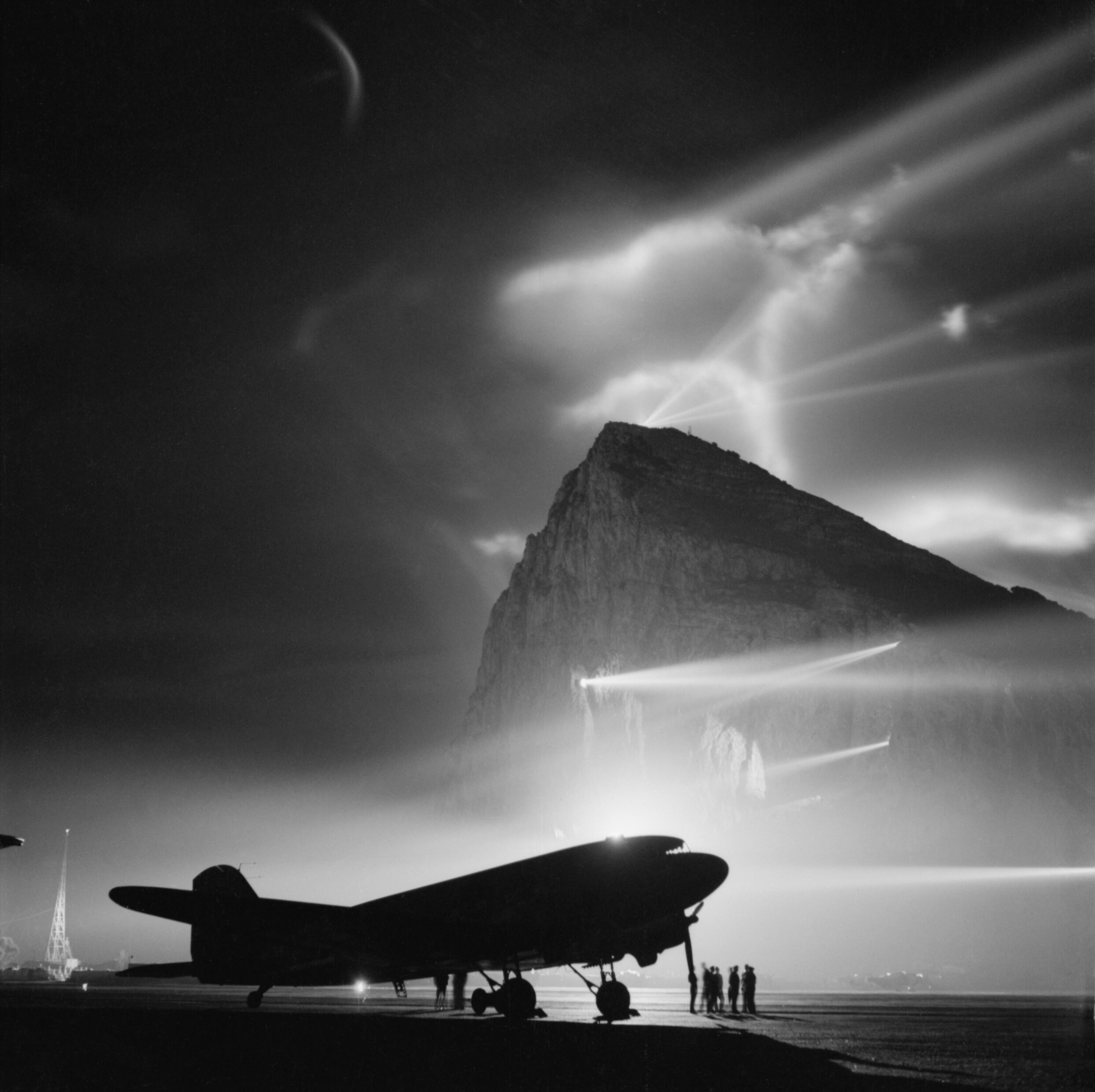
A Douglas DC-3, silhouetted by night at Gibraltar by the batteries of searchlights on the Rock, as it is prepared for a flight to the United Kingdom.

=== Previous attacks on the same aircraft ===
The aircraft flying the Lisbon–Whitchurch route were left unmolested after the beginning of the war. Both Allied and Axis powers respected the neutrality of countries such as Portugal, Sweden, and Switzerland and refrained from attacking flights into and out of those nations. The war over the Bay of Biscay, which is north of Spain and off the west coast of France, began to heat up in 1942.

In 1941 the Germans created Fliegerführer Atlantik (Flying Command Atlantic) at Merignac near Bordeaux and Lorient to attack Allied shipping. In 1943, fighting over the area intensified and the RAF and Luftwaffe saw increased losses. This meant increased danger for BOAC aircraft flying between Lisbon and Whitchurch.

On 15 November 1942, G-AGBB Ibis was attacked by a single Messerschmitt Bf 110 fighter, but was able to limp on to Lisbon, where repairs were carried out; damage sustained included the port wing, engine nacelle, and fuselage. (Note: The crew aboard on 15 November 1942 were: Captain Theo Verhoeven, flight engineer Gerard Alsem, and radio operator Leo Dik.) On 19 April 1943, the same aircraft was attacked at 46°N 9°W by six Bf 110 fighters. Captain Koene Dirk Parmentier evaded the attackers by dropping to 50 ft (15 m) above the ocean and then climbing steeply into the clouds. The Ibis again sustained damage to the port aileron, shrapnel to the fuselage, and a punctured fuel tank. A new wingtip was flown to Lisbon to complete repairs. Despite these attacks, KLM and BOAC continued to fly the Lisbon–Whitchurch route. Although there were three other aircraft – two KLM DC-3s and one KLM DC-2 – in use by BOAC on the same route, G-AGBB Ibis was the only one attacked three times.

== Flight details ==
=== Aircraft and crew ===
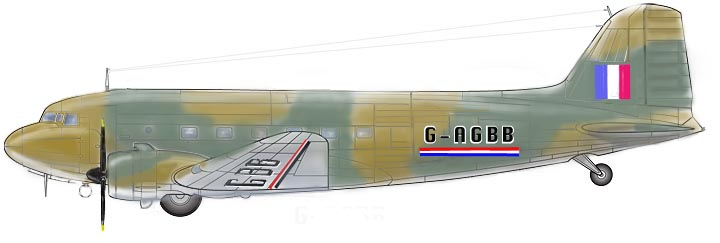
A digital illustration of G-AGBB, the aircraft involved in the shootdown

The Douglas DC-3-194 was the first DC-3 delivered to KLM on 21 September 1936. It originally carried the aircraft registration PH-ALI and was named Ibis, the bird venerated in the ancient world. In the afternoon of 9 May 1940, the day before the German invasion of the Netherlands, the DC-3 arrived in Shoreham on a scheduled flight from Amsterdam under captain Quirinus Tepas. After the German invasion, the aircraft and its crew were instructed to remain in Britain. On 25 July 1940, the registration was changed to G-AGBB and the aircraft was camouflaged in the standard brown-green RAF scheme of the time.

There were four Dutch crew on the flight. First in command: Captain Quirinus Tepas OBE, second in command: Captain Dirk de Koning (also aboard the second attack on the Ibis), wireless operator: Cornelis van Brugge (also known from the 1934 London-Melbourne MacRobertson Air Race), flight engineer: Engbertus Rosevink. Most crew members diverted to England in their aircraft after the German invasion of the Netherlands, and some of them settled in the Bristol area.

=== Passenger list ===
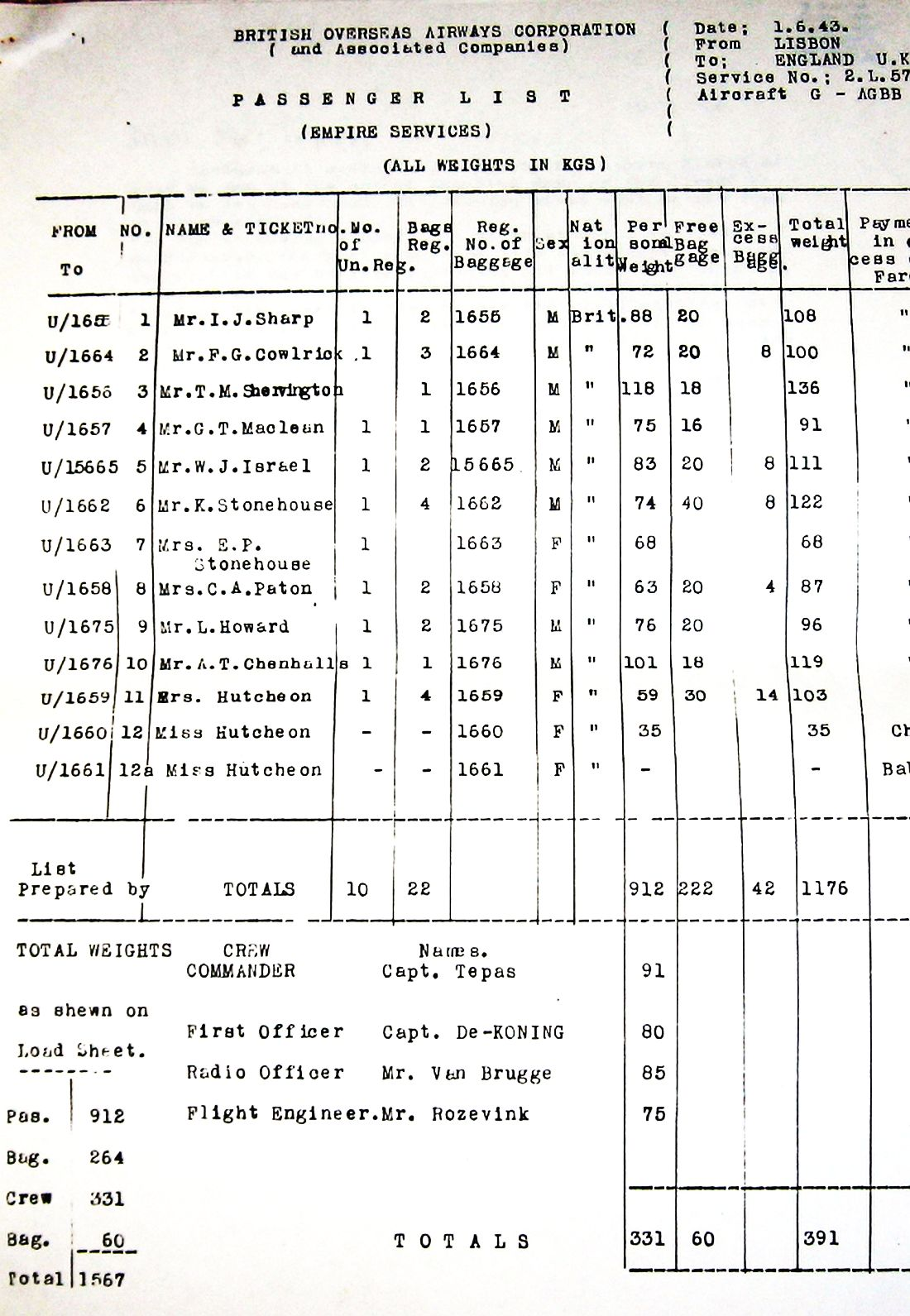
BOAC flight 777 passenger list

The passenger list included:

- Leslie Howard, stage and film actor
- Alfred T. Chenhalls, Howard's friend and accountant
- Kenneth Stonehouse, a Washington, D.C., correspondent of Reuters news agency, and his wife Evelyn Peggy Margetts Stonehouse
- Rotha Hutcheon and her daughters Petra (11) and Carolina (18 months)
- Tyrrell Mildmay Shervington, director of Shell-Mex & BP in Lisbon
- Ivan James Sharp, a senior official of the United Kingdom Commercial Corporation (UKCC)
- Wilfrid Israel, a prominent Anglo-German Jewish activist working to save Jews from the Holocaust
- Gordon Thompson MacLean, an Inspector of British Consulates.

Flight 777 was full, and several would-be passengers were turned away, including British Squadron Leader Wally Lashbrook. (Note: Squadron Leader Wally Lashbrook's Handley Page Halifax bomber was shot down over Belgium in April 1943, and he managed to evade capture and escaped to Portugal.) Three passengers disembarked before departure. Derek Partridge, the young son of a British diplomat, and his nanny Dora Rove (Note: In Ronald Howard's book In Search of My Father: A Portrait of Leslie Howard, the nanny's name was Rowe.) were "bumped" to make room for Howard and Chenhalls, who had only confirmed their tickets at 5:00 the night before the flight and whose priority status allowed them to take precedence over other passengers. A Catholic priest also left the aircraft after boarding it, but his identity remains unknown. (Note: According to Ronald Howard's In Search of My Father: A Portrait of Leslie Howard, the priest was Father A. S. Holmes, vice president of the R. C. English College. He was returning to England, but he left the aeroplane to take a last minute phone call.) Anne Chichester-Constable, 7-year-old daughter of WRNS Chief Officer Gladys Octavia Snow OBE was also booked on the flight which connected her return to England from New York. At the last minute, her guardians in Portugal decided that she was too tired and kept her in Portugal. William Amherst Vanderbilt Cecil and his brother George Henry Vanderbilt Cecil, (the sons of Cornelia Stuyvesant Vanderbilt and John Francis Amherst Cecil of the Biltmore Estate) also were passengers booked on the plane. They were fleeing continental Europe, where they had been attending school in Switzerland, due to the worsening of WWII. However, they were bumped off the passenger list to make room last minute for Leslie Howard. They later returned to the United States and ran their ancestral home, the Biltmore Estate and Dairy in Asheville, North Carolina.

After the war, actor Raymond Burr said that he had been married to Scottish actress Annette Sutherland when she was killed on Flight 777. He said he travelled to Spain and Portugal to get information on the disaster but never learned anything about it. According to Burr's biographer Ona L. Hill, "no one by the name of Annette Sutherland Burr was listed as a passenger" on Flight 777.

==== Leslie Howard ====
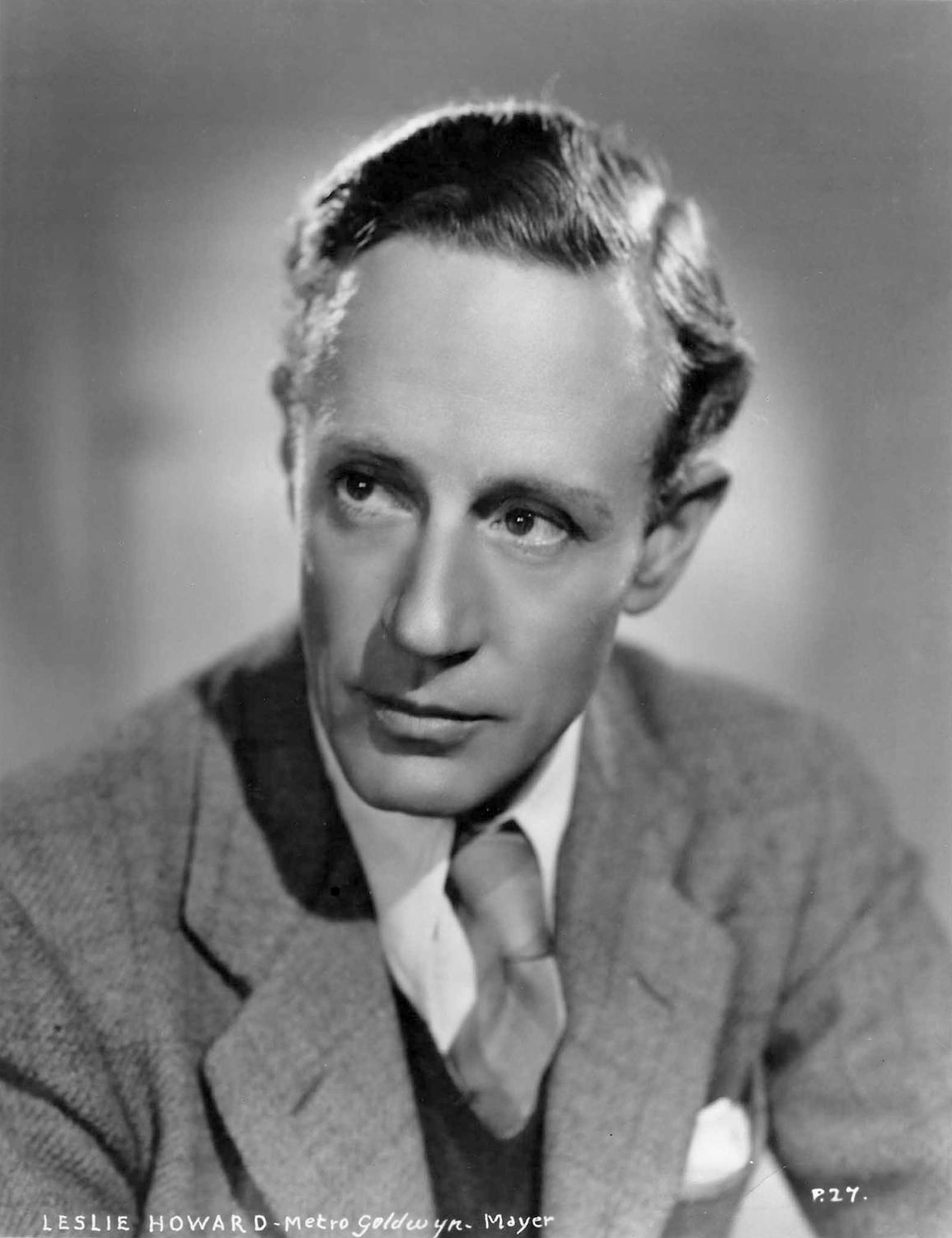
Actor Leslie Howard was the best-known of the 17 crew and passengers aboard BOAC Flight 777.

The most intense intrigue surrounded actor Leslie Howard who was at the peak of his career and had world fame after The Scarlet Pimpernel (1934) and Gone with the Wind (1939). Aside from screen accolades, he was prized by the British government for his anti-Nazi propaganda and films produced in support of the war effort, such as Pimpernel Smith (1941). He had been in Spain and Portugal on a lecture tour promoting The Lamp Still Burns, and the British Council invited him on the tour. He had some qualms, but British Foreign Secretary Anthony Eden encouraged him to go. (Note: Within the British National Archives there is correspondence between Howard and Eden regarding his trip to Spain.)

==== Tyrrell Mildmay Shervington ====
Shervington was director of Shell-Mex & BP in Lisbon, but he was also agent H.100 of the Special Operations Executive's Iberian operation. José Antonio Barreiros suggests that Shervington was the actual target of the attack rather than Howard.

==== Wilfrid Israel ====
Another passenger was Wilfrid Israel, a member of an important Anglo-German Jewish family and a rescuer of Jews from the Holocaust who had close connections to the British government. He was born in England to an Anglo-Jewish mother and German Jewish father, and he and his brother had run the Nathan Israel Department Store in Berlin until it was seized by the Nazis in 1938. As early as 1933, he was obtaining information about Nazi arrest lists and warning the intended victims. He worked with consular officials in the British embassy to obtain visas, and he dismissed 700 of his firm's Jewish staff with two years' pay in 1936, telling them to save themselves by leaving Germany. After Kristallnacht, he was instrumental in setting up the Kindertransport which saved more than 10,000 Jewish children from Germany and Austria. He remained in Berlin until 1939 when he left for Britain. He returned to Berlin once more before the outbreak of war to secure the departure of a last trainload of children. On 26 March 1943, he left Britain for Portugal and spent two months distributing certificates of entry to British-ruled Palestine.

== Attack ==
=== 7:35–10:54 Takeoff and flight ===
On 1 June 1943, the BOAC flight from Lisbon to Whitchurch was assigned to the Ibis and given flight number 777. It was originally scheduled to take off at 7:30 am but was delayed when Howard got off to pick up a package that he had left at customs; it departed at 7:35 GMT. Whitchurch received a departure message and continued regular radio contact until 10:54. The flight was roughly 200 miles (320 km) northwest of the coast of Spain when Whitchurch received a message from wireless operator van Brugge that they were being followed and fired upon at 46°30'N, 009°37'W. Shortly afterwards, the aircraft crashed and sank in the Bay of Biscay.

The following day, BOAC released a statement:

The British Overseas Airways Corporation regrets to announce that a civil aircraft on passage between Lisbon and the United Kingdom is overdue and presumed lost. The last message received from the aircraft stated that it was being attacked by an enemy aircraft. The aircraft carried 13 passengers and a crew of four. Next-of-kin have been informed.

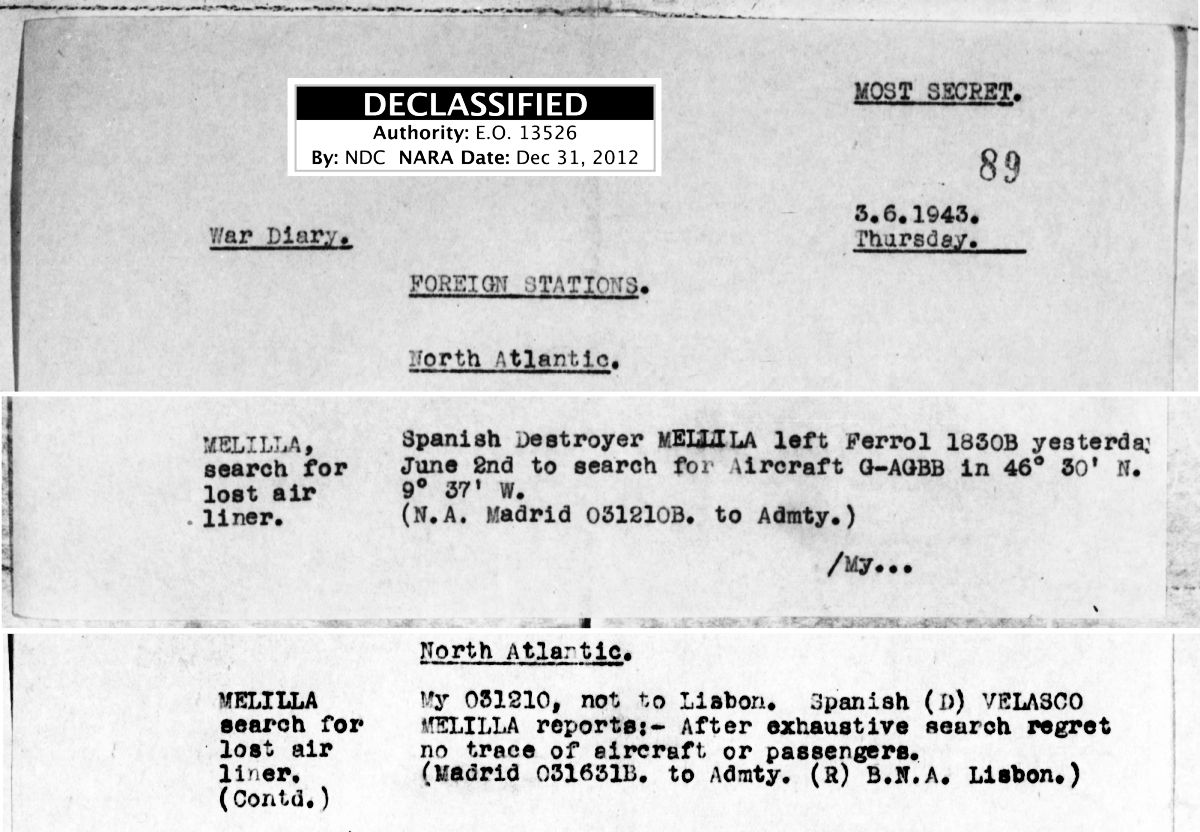
G-AGBB BOAC / PH-ALI KLM, search 3 June 1943 by Spanish destroyer

=== Media accounts ===
The New York Times announced on 3 June: "A British Overseas Airways transport plane, with the actor Leslie Howard reported among its 13 passengers, was officially declared overdue and presumed lost today.... In their daily communique, broadcast from Berlin and recorded by The Associated Press, the Germans said: 'Three enemy bombers and one transport were downed by German reconnaissance planes over the Atlantic'."

Time magazine carried a brief story on 14 June, including details of the final radio broadcast from the Dutch pilot. "I am being followed by strange aircraft. Putting on best speed.... we are being attacked. Cannon shells and tracers are going through the fuselage. Wave-hopping and doing my best." The news of Howard's death was published in the same issue of The Times that falsely reported the death of Major William Martin, the red herring used for the ruse involved in Operation Mincemeat.

=== German pilots' account ===
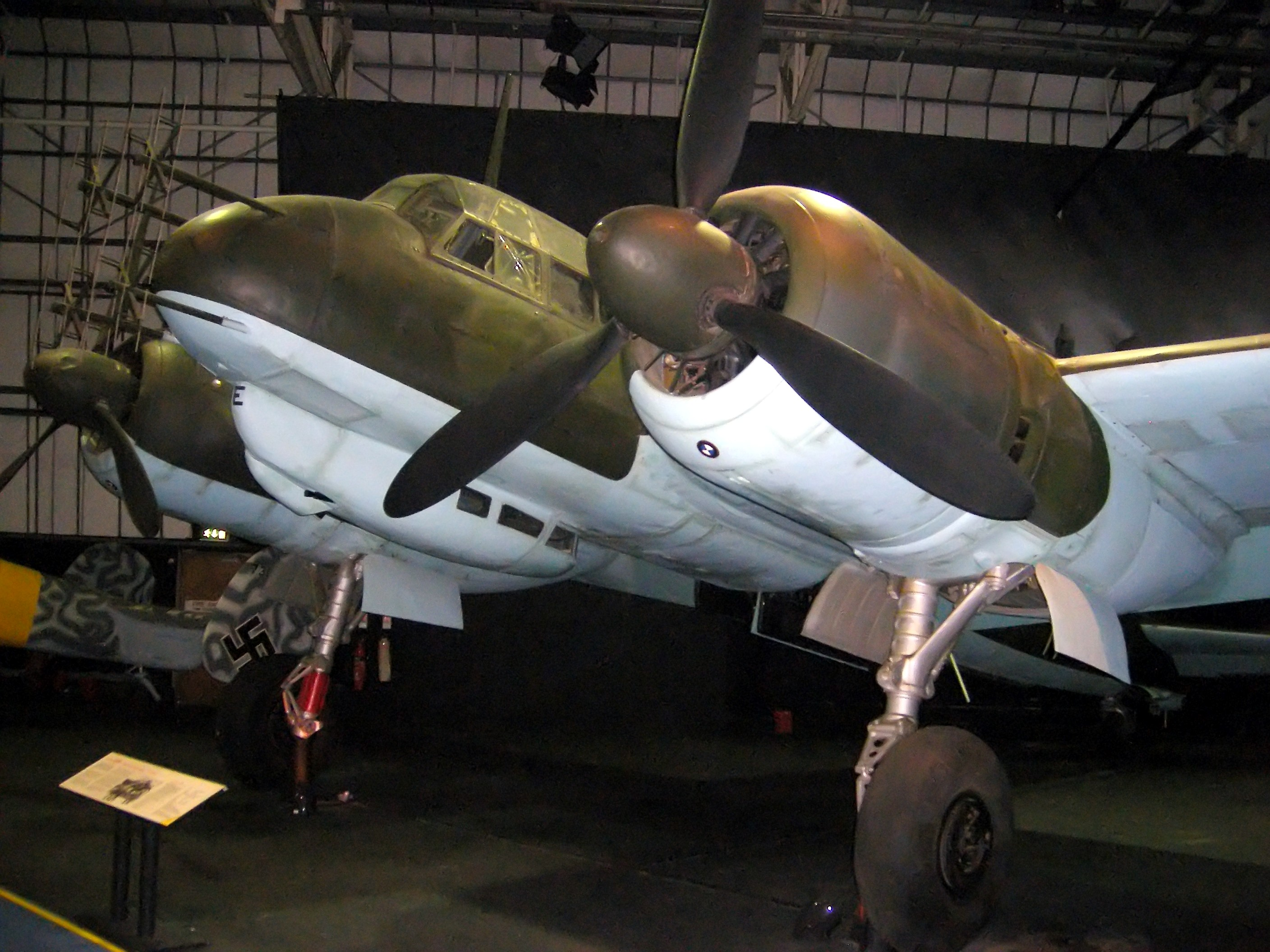
Eight Junkers Ju 88C-6s similar to this preserved Ju 88R-1 night fighter version on display at RAF Hendon attacked and downed BOAC Flight 777.

Bloody Biscay: The History of V Gruppe/Kampfgeschwader 40 by Christopher H. Goss revealed one of the most detailed versions of the attack. The book states that BOAC Flight 777 was not intentionally targeted and was shot down when it was mistaken for an Allied military aircraft. The account is composed of the author's analysis of events and interviews, conducted decades after the war ended, with some of the German pilots involved in the attack.

According to this account, eight Junkers Ju 88C-6 heavy fighters (Zerstörer) from the 14th Staffel of the Luftwaffe's main maritime bomber wing, Kampfgeschwader 40, took off from Bordeaux at 10:00 hrs local time to find and escort two U-boats; these aircraft belonged to the long-range fighter group known as Gruppe V Kampfgeschwader 40. The names of four of the eight pilots are known: Staffelführer Oberleutnant (Oblt) Herbert Hintze, Leutnant Max Wittmer-Eigenbrot, Oblt Albrecht Bellstedt, and Oberfeldwebel Hans Rakow. The pilots claim that before setting out they were unaware of the presence of the Lisbon-to-Whitchurch flights. Due to bad weather, the search for the U-boats was called off and the fighters continued a general search. At 12:45 hrs, BOAC Flight 777 was spotted in P/Q 24W/1785 heading north. Approximately five minutes later, the Ju 88s attacked. Hintze retold his account for Goss as follows: "A 'grey silhouette' of a plane was spotted from 2,000 to 3,000 metres (6,600–9,800 ft) and no markings could be made out, but by the shape and construction of the plane it was obviously enemy." Bellstedt radioed: "Indians at 11 o'clock, AA (code for enemy aircraft ahead slightly to left, attack)." BOAC Flight 777 was attacked from above and below by the two Ju 88s assigned to a high position over the flight, and the port engine and wing caught fire. At this point flight leader Hintze, at the head of the remaining six Ju 88s, caught up to the DC-3 and recognised the aircraft as civilian, immediately calling off the attack, but the burning DC-3 was already severely damaged with the port engine out. Three parachutists exited the burning aircraft, but their chutes did not open as they were on fire. The aircraft then crashed into the ocean, where it floated briefly before sinking. There were no signs of survivors.

Hintze states that all the German pilots involved expressed regret for shooting down a civilian aircraft and were "rather angry" with their superiors for not informing them that there was a scheduled flight between Lisbon and Britain. Goss writes that official German records back up Hintze's account that Staffel 14/KG 40 was carrying out normal operations and that the day's events occurred because the U-boats could not be found. He concludes that "there is nothing to prove that [the German pilots] were deliberately aiming to shoot down the unarmed DC-3." This account of the German pilots and Goss's conclusions are challenged by some authorities.

The research of Ben Rosevink, a retired research technician at the University of Bristol, and son of BOAC Flight 777 flight engineer Engbertus Rosevink supplements Hintze's version. In the 1980s, Rosevink tracked down and interviewed three of the German pilots involved in the attack, including the one who fired on BOAC Flight 777. In a 2010 interview with the Bristol Evening Post, Rosevink stated that he was convinced of the veracity of the German account.

The following day, a search of the Bay of Biscay was undertaken by N/461, a Short Sunderland flying boat from the Royal Australian Air Force's 461 Squadron. Near the coordinates where the DC-3 was downed, the Sunderland was attacked by eight V/KG40 Ju 88s and during a furious battle, managed to shoot down three of the attackers, scoring an additional three "possibles," before crash-landing at Penzance. In the aftermath of these two actions, all BOAC flights from Lisbon were subsequently re-routed and operated only under cover of darkness. (Note: Ostensibly on a long range anti-submarine patrol, the crew of "N/461" received information about the downing of BOAC Flight 777 but were not specifically searching for survivors.) (Note: V/KG40 regarded the action on 2 June 1943 as successful despite the evidence that three Ju 88s and possibly six had been downed. The Sunderland flying boat was severely damaged and gunner Sgt. Miles was killed during the exchange.)

== Theories for the attack ==
Several theories have been suggested to explain why BOAC Flight 777 was shot down. All of these contradict the claims by the German pilots involved that they had not been ordered to shoot down the airliner, either because the theories were formulated before the testimonies of the German pilots were recorded in the 1990s, or because their authors disbelieve the German pilots.

The 2010 biography by Estel Eforgan, Leslie Howard: The Lost Actor examined evidence available at that time and concluded that Howard was not a specific target, corroborating the claims by German sources that the shooting down was caused by mistakenly thinking the plane was an enemy aircraft and was "an error in judgement."

=== Churchill assassination attempt ===
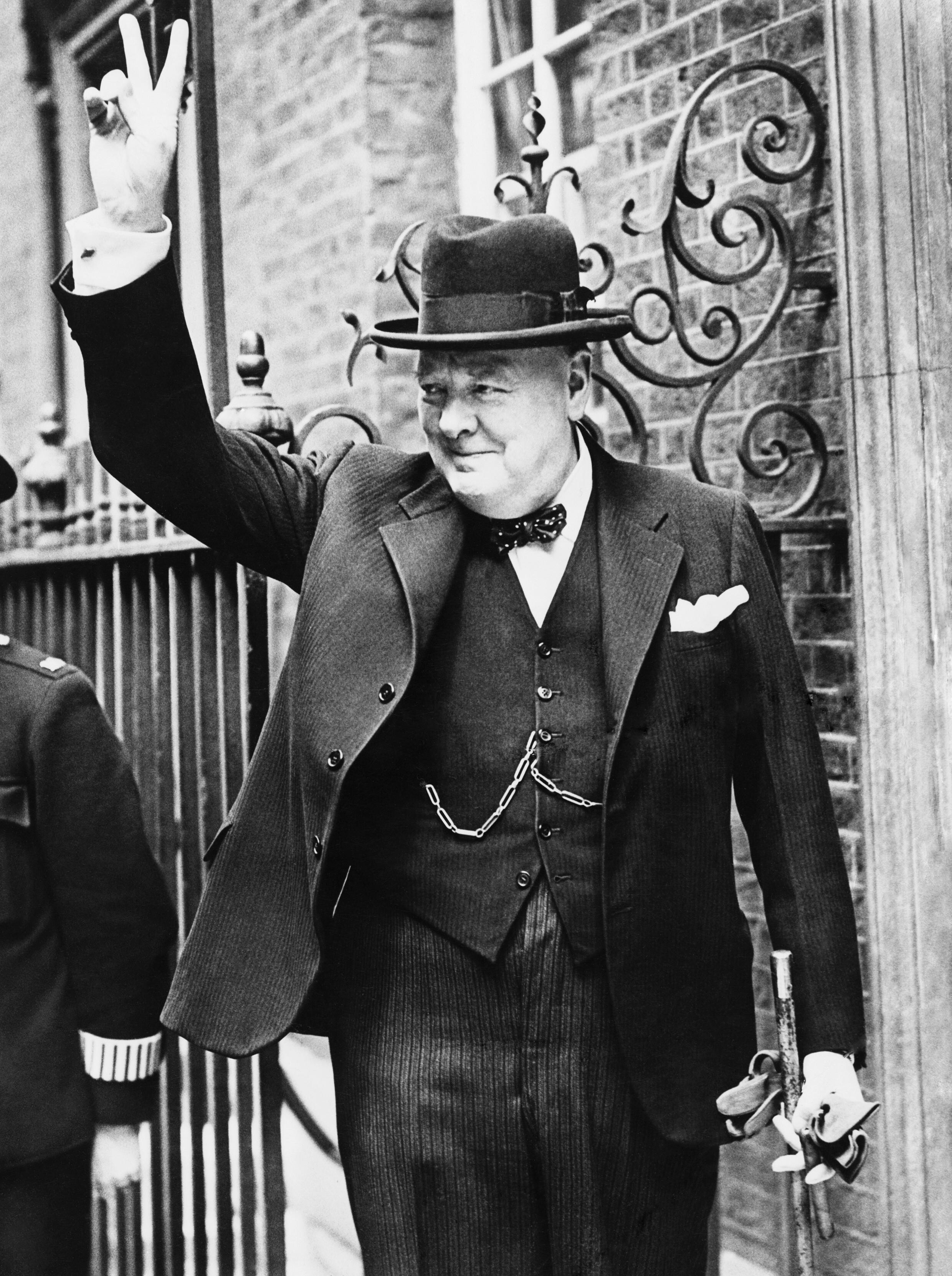
Winston Churchill giving his famous V sign.

The most popular theory surrounding the downing of BOAC Flight 777 is that German intelligence mistakenly believed Winston Churchill was on the flight. This theory appeared in the press within days of the incident, and Churchill himself supported it.

In late May 1943, Churchill and Foreign Secretary Anthony Eden travelled to North Africa for a meeting with United States General Dwight D. Eisenhower. The German government was eager to assassinate Churchill on his return flight home, and monitored flights in and out of the region in case the Prime Minister tried to sneak home aboard a civilian airliner. This scenario was plausible as Churchill flew to Britain from Bermuda in January 1942 aboard a scheduled commercial airline flight. Rumours had circulated since early May that Churchill might fly home from Lisbon. Some have speculated that Britain's Secret Intelligence Service planted these rumours to mask Churchill's travel itinerary.

According to the Churchill assassination theory, as passengers were boarding BOAC Flight 777, German agents spotted what Churchill described in his memoirs as "a thick-set man smoking a cigar," whom they mistook for the Prime Minister. This man was later identified as Alfred T. Chenhalls, Howard's accountant and portly travel companion. In addition, some have speculated that the tall and thin Howard may have been mistaken for Detective Inspector Walter H. Thompson, Churchill's personal bodyguard who had a similar physical appearance. There is an even more elaborate version of this theory that posits Chenhalls was employed by the British government as Churchill's "deliberate double" and that he and Howard boarded BOAC Flight 777 knowing they were going to die. An alternative version of this is that the British government had intercepted German messages via the Ultra code breaking operations, but failed to notify the BOAC Flight 777 for fear of compromising the use of Ultra decrypted messages. Both Flight 777 (1957), a book by Ian Colvin about the incident, and In Search of My Father (1981), by Leslie Howard's son Ronald Howard, lend credence to the idea that BOAC Flight 777 was downed because the Germans thought Churchill was on the flight.

Churchill appeared to accept this theory in his memoirs, although he is extremely critical of the poor German intelligence that led to the disaster. He wrote, "The brutality of the Germans was only matched by the stupidity of their agents. It is difficult to understand how anyone could imagine that with all the resources of Great Britain at my disposal I should have booked a passage in an unarmed and unescorted plane from Lisbon and flown home in broad daylight." As it was, Churchill travelled back to Britain via Gibraltar, departing on the evening of 4 June 1943 in a converted Consolidated B-24 Liberator transport and arriving in Britain the next morning.

In the BBC television series, Churchill's Bodyguard (original broadcast 2006), it is suggested that (Abwehr) German intelligence agents were in contact with members of the merchant navy in Britain and were informed of Churchill's departure and route. German spies watching the airfields of neutral countries may have mistaken Howard and his manager, as they boarded their aircraft, for Churchill and his bodyguard. Churchill's Bodyguard noted that Thompson wrote that Winston Churchill at times seemed clairvoyant about suspected threats to his safety, and acting on a premonition, he changed his departure to the following day. The crux of the theory posited that Churchill asked one of his men to tamper with an engine on his aircraft, giving him an excuse not to travel at that time. Speculation by historians has also centred on whether the British code breakers had decrypted several top secret Enigma messages that detailed the assassination plan. Churchill wanted to protect any information uncovered by the code breakers so the Oberkommando der Wehrmacht would not suspect that their Enigma machines were compromised. Although the overwhelming majority of published documentation of the case repudiates this theory, it remains a possibility. Coincidentally, the timing of Howard's takeoff and the flight path was similar to Churchill's, making it easy for the Germans to mistake the two flights.

=== Assassination of Leslie Howard as a spy ===
Several books focused on Flight 777, including Flight 777 (Ian Colvin, 1957) and In Search of My Father: A Portrait of Leslie Howard (Ronald Howard, Leslie's son, 1984), conclude that the Germans were almost certainly out to shoot down the DC-3 to kill Howard himself. Howard had been travelling through Spain and Portugal, ostensibly lecturing on film, but also meeting with local propagandists and shoring up support for the Allied cause. The Germans in all probability suspected even more surreptitious activities since German agents were active throughout Spain and Portugal, which, like Switzerland, was a crossroads for persons from both sides of the conflict, but even more accessible to Allied citizens. James Oglethorpe, a British historian specialising in the Second World War, has investigated Howard's connection to the secret services. Ronald Howard's book, in particular, explores in great detail written German orders to the Ju 88 Staffel based in France, assigned to intercept the aircraft, as well as communiqués on the British side that verify intelligence reports of the time indicating a deliberate attack on Howard. These accounts also indicate that the Germans were aware of Churchill's whereabouts at the time and were not so naïve as to believe he would be travelling alone on board an unescorted and unarmed civilian aircraft, which Churchill also acknowledged as improbable. Howard and Chenhalls were not originally booked on the flight, and used their priority status to have passengers removed from the fully booked airliner. Of the 13 travellers on board, most were either British executives with corporate ties to Portugal, or comparatively lower-ranked British government civil servants. There were also two or three children of British military personnel. William Amherst Vanderbilt Cecil and his brother George Henry Vanderbilt Cecil, (the sons of Cornelia Stuyvesant Vanderbilt and John Francis Amherst Cecil of Biltmore Estate fame) also were passengers booked on the plane. They were fleeing continental Europe, where they had been attending school in Switzerland, due to the worsening of WWII. However, they were bumped off the passenger list to make room last minute for Leslie Howard. They later returned to the United States and ran their ancestral home, The Biltmore Estate and Dairy in Asheville, NC.

While ostensibly on "entertainer goodwill" tours at the behest of the British Council, Howard engaged in intelligence-gathering activities that attracted German interest. The chance to demoralise Britain with the loss of one of its most outspokenly patriotic figures may have been behind the Luftwaffe attack. A 2008 book by Spanish writer José Rey Ximena claims that Howard was on a top-secret mission for Churchill to dissuade Francisco Franco, Spain's authoritarian dictator and head of state, from joining the Axis powers. Via an old girlfriend (Conchita Montenegro), Howard had contacts with Ricardo Giménez-Arnau, who at the time was a young and very humble diplomat in the Spanish Ministry of Foreign Affairs. Further circumstantial background evidence is revealed in Jimmy Burns's 2009 biography of his father, spymaster Tom Burns. According to author William Stevenson in A Man called Intrepid, his biography of Sir William Samuel Stephenson (no relation), the senior representative of British Intelligence for the Western hemisphere during the Second World War, Stephenson postulated that the Germans knew about Howard's mission and ordered the aircraft shot down. Stephenson further claimed that Churchill knew in advance of the German intention to shoot down the aircraft, but decided to allow it to proceed to protect the fact that the British had broken the German Enigma code. (Note: There has also been speculation that passengers Shervington, Stonehouse and Sharp, among others, were spies for the British.)

=== Assassination of Leslie Howard, the propaganda figure ===
Ronald Howard was convinced the order to shoot down Howard's airliner came directly from Joseph Goebbels, Minister of Public Enlightenment and Propaganda in Nazi Germany, who had been ridiculed in one of Howard's films and who believed Howard to be the most dangerous British propagandist. The theory that Leslie Howard was targeted for assassination because of his role as an anti-Nazi propaganda figure is supported by journalist and law professor Donald E. Wilkes Jr. Wilkes writes that Joseph Goebbels could have orchestrated the downing of BOAC Flight 777 because he was "enraged" by Howard's propaganda and was Howard's "bitterest enemy." The fact that Howard was Jewish would only further buttress this theory. In fact, Germany's propaganda machine boasted at Howard's death and Joseph Goebbels' propagandist newspaper Der Angriff ("The Attack") ran the headline "Pimpernel Howard has made his last trip," which was a reference to both the 1934 movie The Scarlet Pimpernel where the actor played a mysterious British hero who secretly saves French citizens from the Reign of Terror, and the 1941 offshoot film Pimpernel Smith that starred Howard as a professor who rescues victims of Nazi persecution.

=== Howard mistaken for R. J. Mitchell ===
One of the less credible theories that circulated at the time was reported by Harry Pusey. Howard had played the part of R. J. Mitchell, the engineer behind the Supermarine Spitfire in the film The First of the Few. Before the attack on BOAC Flight 777, the film was playing widely in Lisbon cinemas, and German spies may have seen it. Gossip on the streets of Lisbon held that German agents mistakenly believed Howard was actually Mitchell, which led to the downing of the flight. Pusey debunked this theory: "But you would have thought someone in German Intelligence would have known that Mitchell had died in 1937, wouldn't you?"

== Legacy ==
The downing of BOAC Flight 777 elicited headlines around the world, and there was widespread public grief, especially for the loss of Leslie Howard, who was championed as a martyr. The British government condemned the downing of BOAC Flight 777 as a war crime. The public's attention shifted focus as other events occurred. Nonetheless, two authoritative works examined the circumstances of the downing of BOAC Flight 777: in 1957, journalist Ian Colvin's book on the disaster, Flight 777: The Mystery of Leslie Howard and in 1984, Howard's son Ronald's biography of his father.

In 2003, on the 60th anniversary of the downing of Flight 777, a pair of television documentaries on the subject were released: the BBC series Inside Out and the History Channel's Vanishings! Leslie Howard – Movie Star or Spy?

In 2009, the grandson of Ivan Sharp, who lives in Norwich, and has the same name as his grandfather, arranged for a memorial plaque for the crew and passengers of BOAC Flight 777 to be dedicated at Lisbon Airport. On 1 June 2010, a similar plaque, paid for by Sharp, was unveiled at Whitchurch Airport in Bristol, and a brief memorial was held by friends and family of those killed on the flight.

A documentary film Leslie Howard: The Man Who Gave a Damn (2016), which includes commentary on the ill-fated flight, was narrated by Derek Partridge, who at the age of seven gave up his seat on BOAC Flight 777 for Leslie Howard and Alfred T. Chenhalls, and later in life became a television and screen actor.

== See also ==
- Aviation accidents and incidents
- List of accidents and incidents involving commercial aircraft
- List of airliner shootdown incidents

== Bibliography ==
- Burns, Jimmy (2009). Papa Spy: Love, Faith and Betrayal in Wartime Spain. London: Bloomsbury Publishing. ISBN 978-0-7475-9520-5.
- Colvin, Ian (2007). Admiral Canaris: Chief of Intelligence. London: Colvin Press. ISBN 978-1-4067-5821-4..
- Eforgan, Estel (2010). 'Leslie Howard: The Lost Actor. London: Vallentine Mitchell. ISBN 978-0-85303-941-9.
- Goss, Chris (2001). Bloody Biscay: The Story of the Luftwaffe's Only Long Range Maritime Fighter Unit, V Gruppe/Kampfgeschwader 40, and Its Adversaries, 1941-1944. Crecy Publishing. ISBN 978-0-947554-87-3.
- Hagens, Jan (2000). Londen of Berlijn: De KLM en haar personeel in oorlogstijd, Deel 1, 1939–1941. The Netherlands: Bonneville: Bergen. ISBN 90-73304-74-1.
- Hill, Ona L. (1999). 'Raymond Burr: A Film, Radio and Television Biography. New York: McFarland & Company . ISBN 0-7864-0833-2.
- Rosevink, Ben; Hintze, Herbert (July 1991). "Howard's end". FlyPast. No. 120. London, UK: Key Publishing Ltd.
- Stevenson, William (2000) [1976]. A Man Called Intrepid: The Incredible WWII Narrative of the Hero Whose Spy Network and Secret Diplomacy Changed the Course of History. Guilford, Delaware: Lyons Press. ISBN 1-58574-154-X..
