= Aubrey Vanderbilt Cecil =

American jewelry designer

- Born: Aubrey Lea Amherst Cecil; Asheville, North Carolina, U.S.
- Occupation: jewelry designer
- Spouse: Kyle Baliles (m. 2016)
- Relatives: William A. V. Cecil (grandfather)

Aubrey Lea Amherst Vanderbilt Cecil Baliles is an American jewelry designer and member of the Vanderbilt family.

== Early life and family ==
Cecil is the daughter of William Amherst Vanderbilt Cecil Jr., the president and CEO of The Biltmore Company, and Virginia Lea Rott. Her grandfather, William Amherst Vanderbilt Cecil Sr., was the owner of Biltmore Estate near Asheville, North Carolina. She is the great-great-granddaughter of George Washington Vanderbilt II and Edith Stuyvesant Dresser.

== Career ==
Cecil worked in operations for The Biltmore Company as the liaison between Biltmore Farms operations and the food and beverage department.

In 2021, she and her husband launched a jewelry brand called Avermore. In 2025, she released a holiday collection, called Christmas with Mrs. Vanderbilt, inspired by her great-great grandmother. She released a line of bridal jewelry in August 2026.

== Personal life ==
On August 6, 2016, Cecil married Kyle Baliles at the Biltmore Estate. She wore a bridal veil from 1903 that passed down through the Lee, Bouvier, and Cecil families and was worn by Jacqueline Bouvier Kennedy and Lee Radziwill.
