= Edith Stuyvesant Gerry =

American philanthropist

Edith Stuyvesant Vanderbilt Gerry
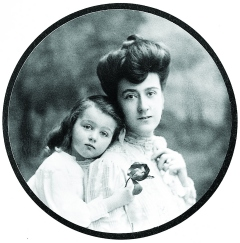
- Edith and her daughter, Cornelia, ca. 1902
- Born: Edith Stuyvesant Dresser; January 17, 1873; Newport, Rhode Island, U.S.
- Died: December 21, 1958 (aged 85); Providence, Rhode Island, U.S.
- Spouses: George Washington Vanderbilt II (m. 1898; died 1914) Peter Goelet Gerry (m. 1925; died 1957)
- Children: Cornelia Stuyvesant Vanderbilt
- Parent(s): George Warren Dresser; Susan Fish LeRoy Dresser
- Relatives: Daniel LeRoy Dresser (brother); George Henry Vanderbilt Cecil (grandson); William Amherst Vanderbilt Cecil (grandson)

Edith Stuyvesant Vanderbilt Gerry (née Dresser; January 17, 1873 – December 21, 1958) was an American philanthropist and wife of George Washington Vanderbilt II and Peter Goelet Gerry, a United States senator from Rhode Island.

== Early life ==
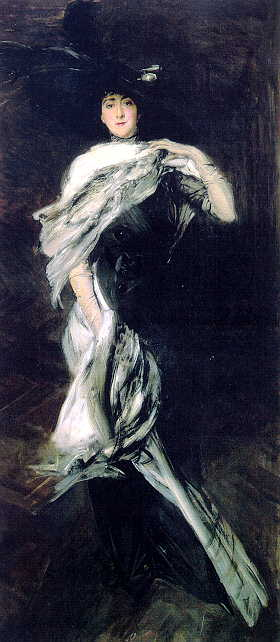
Painting of Edith by Giovanni Boldini, 1911

Edith Stuyvesant Dresser was born on January 17, 1873, in Newport, Rhode Island, to Major George Warren Dresser (1837–1883) and Susan Fish Le Roy (1834–1883). She was the great-niece of Hamilton Fish (1808–1893), a U.S. Secretary of State, U.S. Senator, and New York Governor. Through the Fish family, she was a descendant of Peter Stuyvesant, the last governor of Dutch colonial New York through Hamilton Fish's mother, Elizabeth Stuyvesant, Peter Stuyvesant's great-great-granddaughter. She was orphaned at the age of 10 and was raised by her maternal grandmother.

Her elder brother was Daniel LeRoy Dresser, a shipbuilder. She and her sisters, collectively known as the "Dresser girls," were: Susan Leroy Dresser, who married a French Vicomte, Romain D'Osmoy, Natalie Bayard Dresser, who married John Nicholas Brown, and Pauline Georgina Dresser, who married Rev. George D. Merrill.

== Life ==
Edith was a compassionate person; many said that one would not have known she was the mistress of the Biltmore Estate. She was very involved with the families who worked on the Biltmore Estate, as well as the surrounding community. Edith and her husband, George Vanderbilt, were socially progressive thinkers who played pivotal roles in the improvement of the lives of many people in western North Carolina.

Some of her initiatives included sponsoring literacy and educational programs, and promoting crafts through which women might support themselves. On the estate, she took maternity baskets to women who had just given birth to make sure they had everything they needed. Edith also took her daughter Cornelia's old clothing to families with girls who were about the same age.

After her husband's death in March 1914, she continued her work for the community. She became the first woman president of the State Agricultural Society. With this title, Edith helped build a new hospital, among numerous other deeds. Later, she decided to honor George Vanderbilt, her husband, by selling 87,000 acres to create the Pisgah National Forest for the public to enjoy.

== Personal life ==
On June 1, 1898, she married George Washington Vanderbilt II (1862–1914), the owner of the Biltmore Estate in Asheville, North Carolina. Together, they had one daughter Cornelia Stuyvesant Vanderbilt (1900–1976), who married John Francis Amherst Cecil (1890–1954), son of Lord William Cecil and Mary Rothes Margaret Tyssen-Amherst, 2nd Baroness Amherst of Hackney.

After George's death in 1914, she inherited his $50,000,000 estate and later sold the land around the Biltmore Estate to the United States Forest Service. This became part of the Pisgah National Forest.

On October 22, 1925, she married Peter Goelet Gerry (1879–1957), a United States senator from Rhode Island, in London. Gerry had previously been married to Mathilde Scott Townsend (1885–1949), until their divorce in 1925, and was the son of Elbridge Thomas Gerry (1837–1927) and Louisa Matilda Livingston (1836–1920), and the great grandson of Elbridge Gerry (1744–1814), the fifth Vice President of the United States.

She died on December 21, 1958, in Providence, Rhode Island.

=== Descendants ===
Her grandchildren were George Henry Vanderbilt Cecil (1925–2020), the owner and operator of Biltmore Farms, and William Amherst Vanderbilt Cecil (1928–2017), the operator of the Biltmore Estate through his company, The Biltmore Company.

== In popular culture ==
Paul McCartney, in the band Wings, paid homage to her as well as Martha Washington in his 1973 hit "Mrs. Vanderbilt" on the Band on the Run album.
