= Lord William Cecil (courtier) =

British army officer and royal courtier (1854–1943)

Lord William Cecil CVO
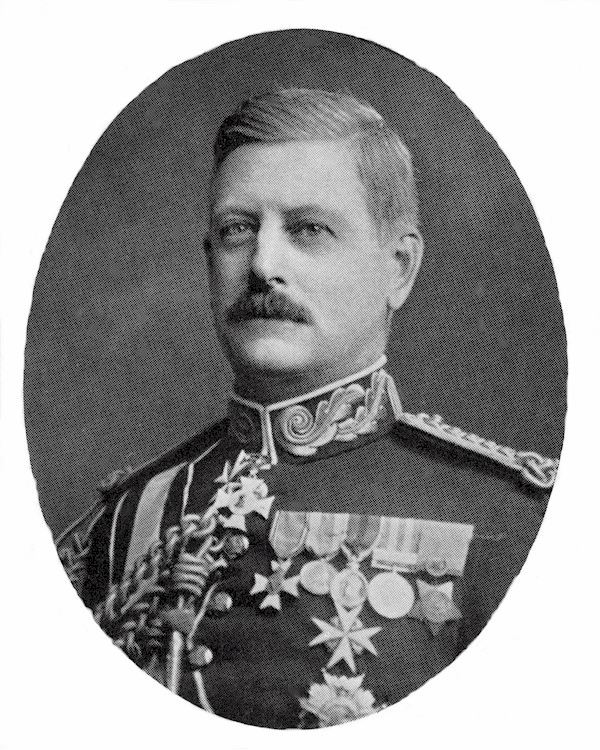

Extra Gentleman-Usher
- In office 1924–1937
- Monarchs: King George V (1924–36); King George VI (1936–37)

Groom-in-Waiting
- In office 1892–1901
- Monarch: Queen Victoria

Personal details
- Born: 4 November 1854 Burghley House, Peterborough
- Died: 16 April 1943 (aged 88) Haywards Heath, Sussex, UK
- Spouses: Mary Cecil, 2nd Baroness Amherst of Hackney (m. 1885; died 1919) Violet Maud Freer (m. 1924)
- Children: William Amherst Cecil; Thomas James Amherst Cecil; John Francis Amherst Cecil; Henry Mitford Amherst Cecil
- Parent(s): 3rd Marquess of Exeter; Lady Georgina Pakenham
- Relatives: 2nd Marquess of Exeter (grandfather); 2nd Earl of Longford (grandfather); George Henry Vanderbilt Cecil (grandson); William Amherst Vanderbilt Cecil (grandson)
- Awards: Congressional Gold Medal

Military service
- Allegiance: United Kingdom
- Branch/service: 4th Battalion, Lincolnshire Regiment
- Rank: Colonel
- Battles/wars: Suakin Expedition

Colonel Lord William Cecil CVO (2 November 1854 – 16 April 1943) was a British army officer and royal courtier.

== Early life ==
Lord William was born on 2 November 1854, a younger son of William Cecil, 3rd Marquess of Exeter (1825–1895) and Lady Georgina Sophia Pakenham (died 1909), daughter of Thomas Pakenham, 2nd Earl of Longford (1774–1835). His paternal grandparents were Brownlow Cecil, 2nd Marquess of Exeter (1795–1867), and Isabella Poyntz, daughter of William Stephen Poyntz (1770–1840), an English Whig and Liberal politician who sat in the House of Commons variously between 1800 and 1837.

His siblings included: Brownlow Henry George, Lord Burghley, later the 4th Marquess of Exeter (1849–1898), Lord Francis Horace Pierrepont (1851–1889), who married Edith Brookes, daughter of Sir William Cunliffe Brooks, 1st Baronet, Lady Catherine Sarah (1861–1918), who married Henry Vane, 9th Baron Barnard, Colonel Lord John Pakenham Joicey-Cecil (1867–1942), Lady Isabella Georgiana Katherine (died 1903), who married William Battie-Wrightson, Lady Mary Louisa Wellesley (died 1930), who married James Hozier, 2nd Baron Newlands, and Lady Louisa Alexandrina (died 1950) and Lady Frances Emily (died 1951), both of whom died unmarried.

== Career ==
Cecil's military career began when he was commissioned as a supernumerary sub-lieutenant in the Northampton and Rutland Militia on 9 May 1874, with subsequent promotion to lieutenant from the same date. On 29 November 1876 he transferred to the regulars as a lieutenant in the 2nd Foot, moving to the Grenadier Guards on 31 January 1877. He served in the Suakin Expedition in Sudan in 1885 and was promoted to captain on 18 July that year.

Cecil was Lieutenant-Colonel Commandant of the 4th (Militia) Battalion, the Lincolnshire Regiment from 16 April 1890, with the honorary rank of colonel. During 1900 the battalion was stationed at Parkhurst barracks on the Isle of Wight, not far from Queen Victoria's residence Osborne House, where Cecil was a regular visitor. He resigned his commission on 13 September 1902, retaining his rank, when his younger brother Lord John succeeded in command of the battalion. During the First World War, he was a temporary major in the 9th Battalion, County of London Volunteer Regiment from 1 September 1916, relinquishing his commission in the Volunteer Force on 12 March 1920.

In July 1892, he was appointed Equerry-in-Waiting to Prince and Princess Henry of Battenberg (she was Princess Beatrice, daughter of the Queen), and the same year he became a Groom-in-Waiting to Queen Victoria and remained as such until her death in 1901. He was then an Extra Gentleman Usher from 1924 under King George V until his retirement in 1937. In 1909, he was invested as a Commander, Royal Victorian Order, C.V.O., and later, he was also invested as Bailiff Grand Cross, Most Venerable Order of the Hospital of St. John of Jerusalem.

== Personal life ==
On 2 September 1885, he had married Hon. Mary Tyssen-Amherst, who succeeded her father as Baroness Amherst of Hackney in 1909. He and his wife had four children before her death in 1919:

- Captain Honourable William Amherst Cecil (1886–1914), who married Gladys Evelyn Baggallay (1884–1947), granddaughter of Rt. Hon. Sir Richard Baggallay
- Captain Honourable Thomas James Amherst Cecil (1887–1955), who married Vera Agnes Barclay (born 1888), granddaughter of Alexander Charles Barclay
- Honourable John Francis Amherst Cecil (1890–1954), who married Cornelia Stuyvesant Vanderbilt (1900–1976), daughter of George Washington Vanderbilt II and Edith Stuyvesant Dresser in 1924. and had issue. They divorced in 1934.
- Commander Honourable Henry Mitford Amherst Cecil (1893–1963), who married Hon. Yvonne Cornwallis (1896–1983), daughter of Fiennes Cornwallis, 1st Baron Cornwallis

On 14 August 1924, after the death of his wife in 1919, he married Violet Maud Freer (died 1957), daughter of Percy Freer and former wife of Herbert Oswald Collyer.

Cecil died on 16 April 1943 at Haywards Heath in Sussex.

=== Descendants ===
As his eldest son, Capt. Hon. William Amherst Cecil died on 16 September 1914 during the First Battle of the Aisne whilst serving with 2nd Bn. Grenadier Guards, Cecil's grandson, William Alexander Evering Cecil (1912–1980), succeeded Cecil's wife as the 3rd Baron Amherst of Hackney upon her death in 1919. The 3rd Baron Amherst of Hackney married Margaret Eirene Clifton Brown (1921–2009), daughter of Howard Clifton Brown (1868–1946), a Conservative Party politician who served as the Member of Parliament for Newbury. The 3rd Baron's younger brother, Hon. Henry Kerr Auchmuty Cecil (1914–1942), was the father of Sir Henry Cecil (1943–2013), an internationally renowned horse trainer.

Through his third son, he was grandfather to George Henry Vanderbilt Cecil (1925–2020), the owner and operator of Biltmore Farms, and William Amherst Vanderbilt Cecil (1928–2017), the operator of the Biltmore Estate through his company, The Biltmore Company.

Through his fourth and youngest son, he was the grandfather of Rear Admiral Sir Oswald Nigel Amherst Cecil (born 1925), the 23rd Lieutenant Governor of the Isle of Man.

== See also ==
- Cecil family
- Amherst family
