= William A. V. Cecil =

American businessman (1928–2017)

- Born: William Amherst Vanderbilt Cecil; August 17, 1928; Asheville, North Carolina
- Died: October 31, 2017 (aged 89); Asheville, North Carolina
- Education: Harvard University
- Occupation: Businessman
- Spouse: Mary Lee Ryan (m. 1957)
- Children: 2
- Parent(s): John Francis Amherst Cecil; Cornelia Stuyvesant Vanderbilt
- Relatives: Aubrey Vanderbilt Cecil (granddaughter); George Henry Vanderbilt Cecil (brother); George Washington Vanderbilt II (maternal grandfather); Edith Stuyvesant Gerry (maternal grandmother); Lord William Cecil (paternal grandfather); Mary Cecil, 2nd Baroness Amherst of Hackney (paternal grandmother); William Cecil, 3rd Marquess of Exeter (paternal great-grandfather)

William Amherst Vanderbilt Cecil (August 17, 1928 – October 31, 2017) was a British-American businessman. He was the owner of the Biltmore Estate through his company, The Biltmore Company.

== Biography ==
William A. V. Cecil was the younger son of Cornelia Stuyvesant Vanderbilt (1900–1976) and English-born aristocrat John Francis Amherst Cecil (1890–1954). He was the grandson of George Washington Vanderbilt II and Lord William Cecil, the great-grandson of William Henry Vanderbilt and William Cecil, 3rd Marquess of Exeter. His maternal great-great grandfather was railroad and steamship baron, "Commodore" Cornelius Vanderbilt. His mother left the family back at the Biltmore Estate in 1932, later divorcing her husband in 1934. Cecil and his older brother were educated in England and Switzerland while his father managed the estate. He served in the British Navy near the end of World War II.

He left England in 1949 to attend Harvard University, graduating in 1952 ahead of his class. Later, he worked in finance in New York City, where he met his future wife, Mary Lee Ryan.

Upon the death of his mother, he inherited the Biltmore Estate once his elder brother, George Henry Vanderbilt Cecil, chose to take charge of the family dairy (known as Biltmore Farms) which was much more profitable at the time. He successfully transformed Biltmore into a popular North Carolina tourist attraction and built a profitable winery on the grounds.

== Personal life ==
Cecil married Mary Lee Ryan, known as "Mimi", in 1957 in New York City. She was a maternal first cousin of First Lady of the United States Jacqueline Kennedy Onassis, both being granddaughters of James T. Lee.

Cecil and his wife had two children:

- William A.V. Cecil, Jr. married Virginia Cecil and had issue. He serves as President and CEO of The Biltmore Company today. His wife Virginia oversees the equestrian center at the estate and is on the Biltmore board of directors.
- Diana Cecil, married George Pickering and had issue.

== Death ==
Cecil died at home in Asheville, North Carolina, on October 31, 2017, aged 89. His death occurred 2 weeks before his wife's death.

== Ancestry ==
Ancestors of William A. V. Cecil

16. Brownlow Cecil, 2nd Marquess of Exeter
8. William Cecil, 3rd Marquess of Exeter
17. Isabella Poyntz
4. Lord William Cecil
18. Thomas Pakenham, 2nd Earl of Longford
9. Lady Georgina Pakenham
19. Lady Georgiana Emma Charlotte Lygon
2. Hon. John Francis Amherst Cecil
20. William George Daniel-Tyssen
10. William Tyssen-Amherst, 1st Baron Amherst of Hackney
21. Mary Fountaine
5. Mary Tyssen-Amherst, 2nd Baroness Amherst of Hackney
22. Adm. Robert Mitford
11. Margaret Susan Mitford
23. Margaret Dunsmore
1. William Amherst Vanderbilt Cecil
24. Cornelius Vanderbilt
12. William Henry Vanderbilt
25. Sophia Johnson
6. George Washington Vanderbilt II
26. Rev. Samuel Kissam
13. Maria Louisa Kissam
27. Margaret Hamilton Adams
3. Cornelia Stuyvesant Vanderbilt
28. George Andrew Dresser
14. Maj. George Warren Dresser
29. Hannah Brown
7. Edith Stuyvesant Dresser
30. Daniel LeRoy
15. Susan Fish LeRoy
31. Susan Elizabeth Fish
