= Kenneth Stonehouse =

British journalist (1908–1943)

Kenneth Stonehouse (10 May 1908 – 1 June 1943) was a British journalist who worked with the Reuters news agency in the United States and Europe. He was killed in the downing of BOAC Flight 777.

== Life ==
Stonehouse was born in Cape Town, South Africa in 1908. He began his career working for the Cape Times and then joined the staff of the South African Morning Newspapers in London. He then applied to work for Reuters, who assigned him to New York.

Stonehouse was sent to Washington, D.C. as Reuters' senior correspondent, covering top stories, including British Prime Minister Winston Churchill's visit to the United States and Canada during the Second World War.

Stonehouse and his wife are listed as passengers aboard the Cohner Brook which in November 1941 traveled from London to Halifax, Nova Scotia in Canada.

In the summer of 1943 Stonehouse had just completed an eighteen-month assignment in Washington, D.C. when he volunteered to become a war correspondent with the United States armed forces fighting in Europe. In order to return to Europe, Stonehouse and his wife Evelyn on 12 May 1943 boarded the Portuguese liner S.S. Serpa Pinto in New York to sail to Portugal, a neutral state during the war. They arrived in Lisbon on 28 May and booked a flight to London. On 1 June 1943, Stonehouse, aged 35, and his wife Evelyn boarded BOAC Flight 777 to London; German fighter planes shot down the plane over the Bay of Biscay, killing all on board.
