= The Biltmore Company =

American company

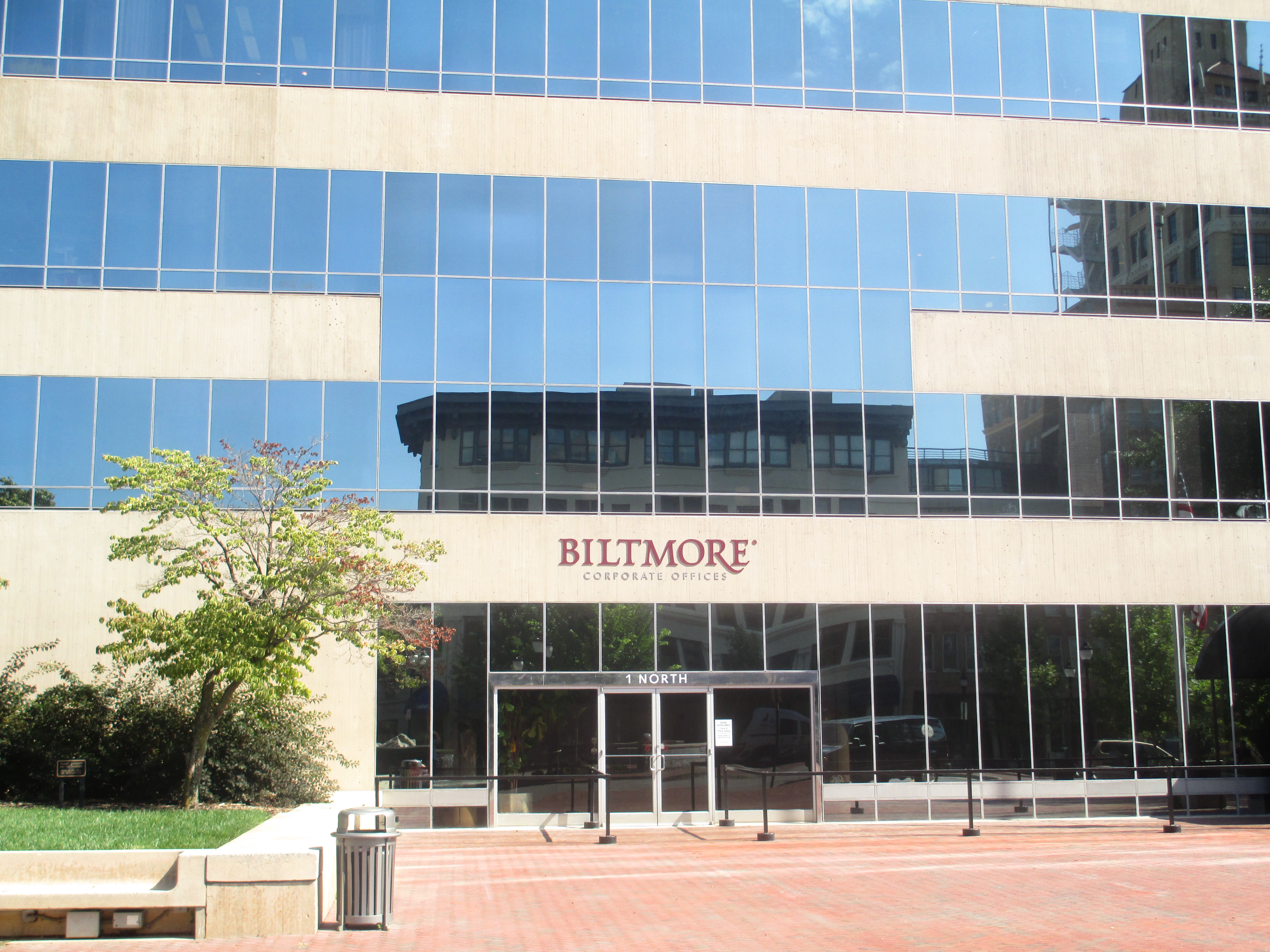
- Corporate office in downtown Asheville
- Type: Private
- Industry: Hospitality
- Founded: 1933
- Headquarters: Asheville, North Carolina, United States
- Key people: Bill Cecil Jr. (CEO)
- Revenue: US$207 million (2016)
- Number of employees: 2,400
- Website: Biltmore Estate

The Biltmore Company is an American firm that owns and operates Biltmore Estate in Asheville, North Carolina. The company is owned by the family of William Amherst Vanderbilt Cecil, the younger grandson of George Washington Vanderbilt II.

In 1999, the company formed a new business group, the Biltmore Estate Brands Group. Currently, the Biltmore Estate home furnishings licensees include Carolina Mirror, Directional Publishing, As You Like It, Craftique, Imperial Home Decor Group, Oriental Accent, Southern Living House Plans, Tai Ping, Paragon Picture Gallery and Sadek Import Company, NDI, Kravet Fabrics, Great City Traders, Keller Charles Inc., Manual Woodworkers and Weavers, and Executive Kitchens, Inc.

In 2001, the 210-room luxury Inn on Biltmore Estate opened. Antler Hill Village, with shops and a restaurant, opened in 2010 and includes the 209-room Village Hotel on Biltmore Estate.

== History ==
George Washington Vanderbilt II first opened the Vanderbilt Estate in 1895. This six-year project was a grand production, with grounds designed by landscaper Frederick Law Olmsted and the house designed by Richard Morris Hunt. The Biltmore Company is and always has been family owned and operated, with a goal of supporting and maintaining the estate and various industries affiliated with the estate.

In 1889, George Vanderbilt and his wife Edith purchased a nearby town, renamed Biltmore Village. This is where employees of the estate resided. Additionally, the couple created and funded Biltmore Estate Industries, which developed a system of teaching traditional craft making. However, after George Vanderbilt's death, both Biltmore Village and Biltmore Estate Industries were sold in an effort to maintain focus on the estate itself.

The Biltmore Company was started in 1933, and it was divided between William Cecil and his elder brother (George Cecil) in the late 1970s. George Cecil's company, called Biltmore Farms, focused on development, including Biltmore Park.

George and Edith Vanderbilt were very environmentally conscious, and they sold over 86,000 acres of the surrounding land to the government to create the Pisgah National Forest. The Biltmore Company values the importance of forest preservation and utilizes techniques to ensure preservation of the soil, water, wildlife and forest of the area.

Today, the company is still run by descendants of George Vanderbilt; the president and CEO is currently Bill Cecil Jr. The company employs over 2,400 people who maintain the 8,000 acres of the Biltmore Estate, hotel, winery, restaurants and shops. Biltmore House is the largest privately owned home in the United States. The company claims to host more than one million guests per year, and it functions solely through private funding.

The Biltmore Company owns 2,485 acres around Biltmore House, plus 1,161 acres on the south side of the estate, where there are riding stables. Other companies include West Range LLC (with 3,067 acres on the estate's west side), Biltmore Estate Wine Co., The Inn on Biltmore Estate, Village Hotel on Biltmore Estate LLC, Busbee Lodge (with 659 acres and the Cecil family home), Biltmore Building LLC (owner of the Pack Square headquarters of The Biltmore Company) and Biltmore Estate Reproductions.

== See also ==
- Biltmore Farms
- Biltmore Forest School
