= Cornelia Stuyvesant Vanderbilt =

American heiress (1900 – 1976)

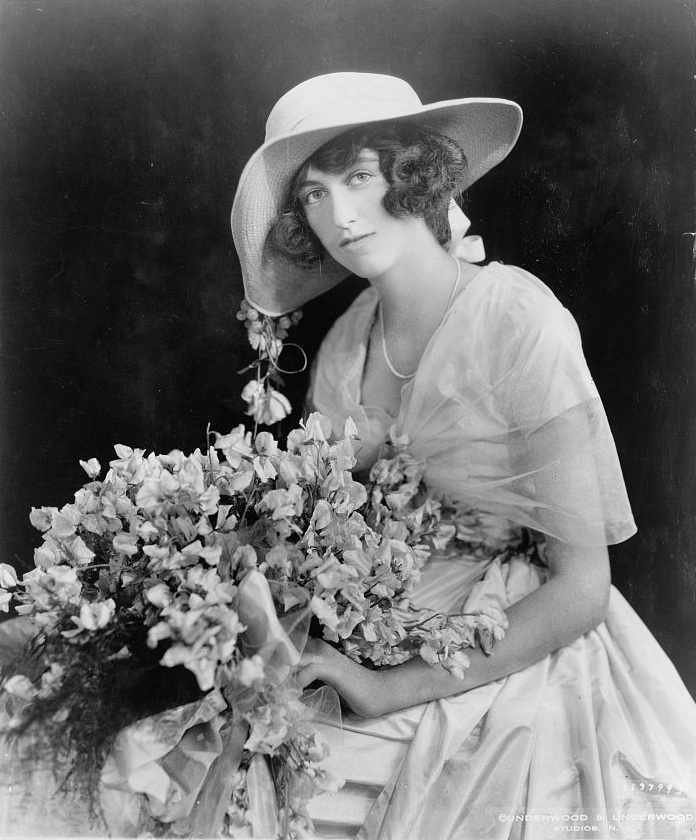
- Cornelia Vanderbilt in 1924.
- Born: Cornelia Stuyvesant Vanderbilt; August 22, 1900; Asheville, North Carolina, U.S.
- Died: February 7, 1976 (aged 75); Oxfordshire, United Kingdom
- Education: University of North Carolina
- Spouses: John Francis Amherst Cecil (m. 1924; div. 1934) Vivian Francis Bulkeley-Johnson (m. 1949; died 1968) William Robert Goodsir (m. 1972)
- Children: George Henry Vanderbilt Cecil; William Amherst Vanderbilt Cecil
- Parent(s): George Washington Vanderbilt II; Edith Stuyvesant Dresser
- Family: Vanderbilt family (by birth); Cecil family (by marriage)

Cornelia Stuyvesant Vanderbilt (August 22, 1900 – February 7, 1976), later The Hon. Mrs. John Francis Amherst Cecil, later Bulkely-Johnson, later Goodsir, was an American born heiress and member of the Vanderbilt family who inherited the Biltmore Estate. She was known for her eccentric behavior.

== Early life ==
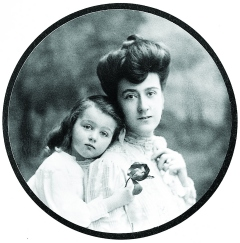
Cornelia, as a toddler, with her mother Edith Stuyvesant Dresser, c. 1902.

Cornelia was born at the Biltmore Estate in North Carolina on August 22, 1900. She was the daughter, and only child, of George Washington Vanderbilt II (1862–1914) and Edith Stuyvesant Dresser (1873–1958). Her father, the youngest child of William Henry Vanderbilt and Maria Louisa (née Kissam) Vanderbilt, built a 250-room mansion, the largest privately owned home in the United States, which he named Biltmore Estate. The estate, designed by architect Richard Morris Hunt, was modeled on the Château de Blois among other châteaux of the Loire Valley in France. She was the great-granddaughter of Commodore Cornelius Vanderbilt, and, on her mother’s side, she was a descendant of Peter Stuyvesant.

After her father's death in 1914, Cornelia inherited the Biltmore estate. Her mother sold approximately 86,000 acres (350 km^{2}) of the Biltmore property to the United States Forest Service to create the core of Pisgah National Forest. Her mother later married Peter Goelet Gerry (1879–1957), a United States senator from Rhode Island.

Cornelia attended the Madeira School in Virginia for high school. She was privately tutored and attended the University of North Carolina for approximately a year. When she reached 21 years old, she received an annuity of $2,000,000 and at the age of 25, she received her full inheritance of $5,000,000 from her father, who had inherited $10,000,000 from his father and spent millions on Biltmore and a New York townhouse on Fifth Avenue.

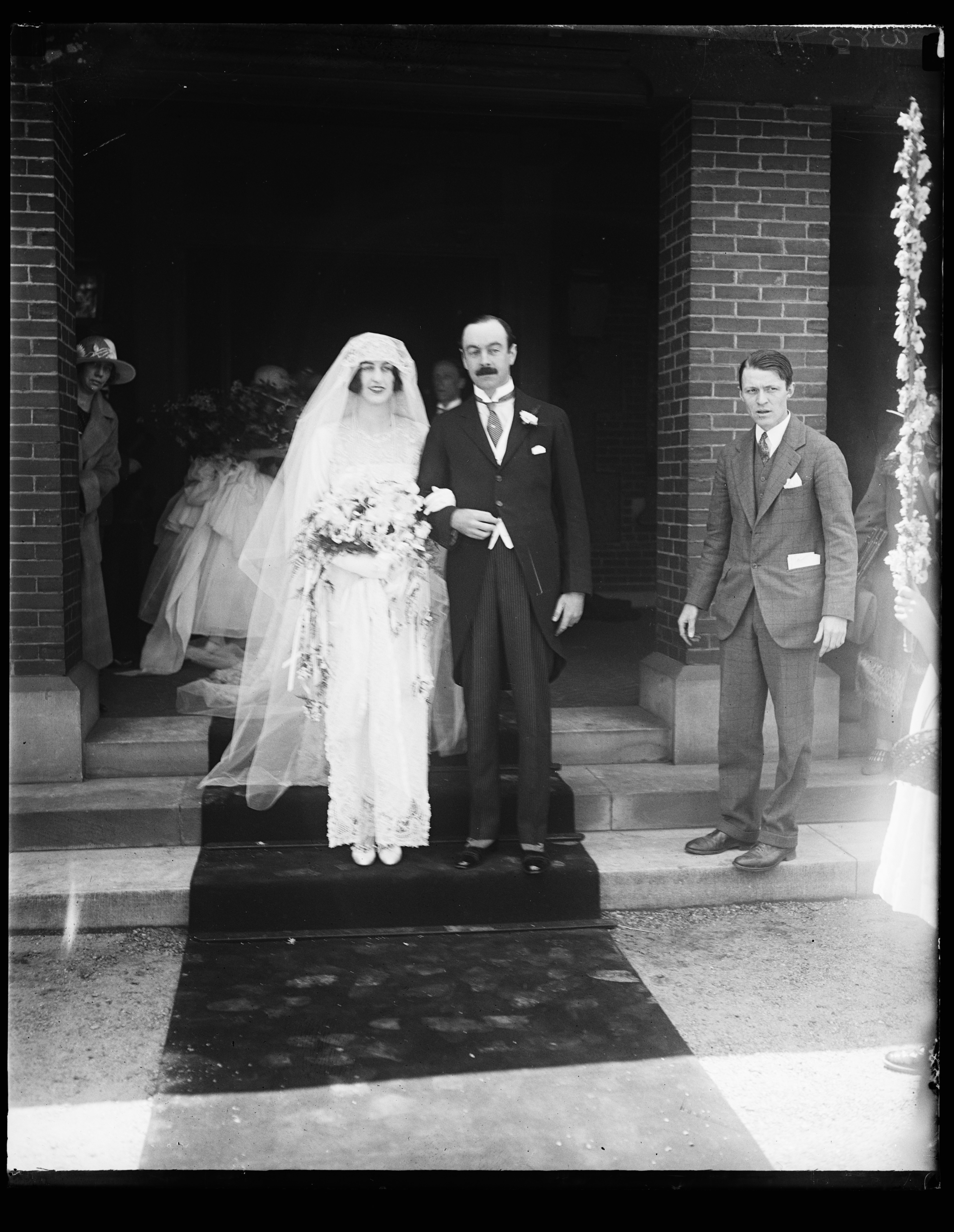
Vanderbilt-Cecil wedding in Biltmore, April 1924.

== Later life ==
In Biltmore, on April 29, 1924, Cornelia married Hon. John Francis Amherst Cecil (1890–1954), a British aristocrat who was then the first secretary of the British Embassy in Washington. He was the son of Lord William Cecil and Mary Cecil, Baroness Amherst of Hackney. The Cecils were descendants of William Cecil. The nationally renowned organist from St. Louis Charles Henry Galloway played organ at the wedding.

Cornelia Vanderbilt and Cecil were the parents of two sons:

- George Henry Vanderbilt Cecil (1925–2020), who married Nancy Owen (1930–2016).
- William Amherst Vanderbilt Cecil (1928–2017), who married Mary Lee Ryan (1931–2017), a first cousin of First Lady Jackie Kennedy, as their mothers, Janet Norton Lee and Marion Merritt Lee, were sisters.

Around 1932, reportedly finding life at Biltmore too dull, she moved to New York City to briefly study art, leaving her husband to manage Biltmore. A few months later, she moved to Paris where she divorced her husband in 1934, dyed her hair bright pink, and changed her name to Nilcha. After her 1934 move abroad, she never returned to Biltmore or the United States again.

After Paris, she moved to London, where she met and married Captain Vivian Francis Bulkeley-Johnson (1891–1968) in October 1949. Bulkeley-Johnson, the aide-de-camp to the 9th Duke of Devonshire when he was the Governor General of Canada from 1916 to 1918, served in the offices of the Imperial War Cabinet in World War I and in the Air Ministry. They remained married until his death in 1968.

At dinner with Edward Adamson in London after her husband's death, Cornelia fell in love with their waiter, William Robert "Bill" Goodsir. In 1972, Cornelia married for the third and final time to Goodsir (1926–1984), who was 26 years younger than she was. She was a friend and supporter of Adamson, the pioneer of Art Therapy, and tried unsuccessfully to fund his post at Netherne Hospital, and the Adamson Collection through her Mrs Smith Trust (correspondence in Edward Adamson Archive at the Wellcome Library).

Cornelia died on February 7, 1976, aged 75, in Oxford, England. Her ashes were placed at a church near her home, The Mount, a farm in the village of Churchill in Oxfordshire, near Kingham.

== Legacy ==
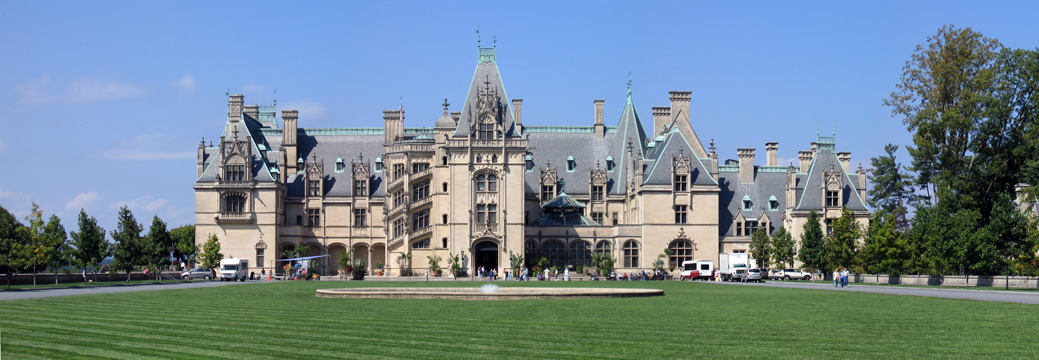
The Biltmore Estate in 2006.

Vanderbilt's sons eventually inherited the Biltmore estate, with George Cecil, the older of the two sons, choosing to inherit the majority of the estate's land and the Biltmore Farms Company, which was more profitable than the house at the time. The younger son, William Cecil, was thus left with Biltmore House. He is credited with preserving the chateau, which is open to the public (although still privately owned). Through George, Vanderbilt was the grandmother of six, and through William, she was the grandmother of two more.
