= Biltmore Park Town Square =

Coordinates: 35.48521°N 82.55538°W

Biltmore Park Town Square is shopping center opened in mid-2009 in Asheville, North Carolina with its anchors being REI, Regal Cinemas, Barnes & Noble, with many other small shops. It was built as an outdoor "Town Center" with store fronts on the outside. Although the center opened in October 9, 2009, the YMCA and some stores began opening as early as 2005.

== Education ==
The small Asheville campus of Western Carolina University is located at Biltmore Park Town Square, while the main campus is located in Cullowhee, North Carolina, about 60 miles away.
