= John Francis Amherst Cecil =

British diplomat who married Cornelia Stuyvesant Vanderbilt (1890 –1954)

The Honourable John Francis Amherst Cecil
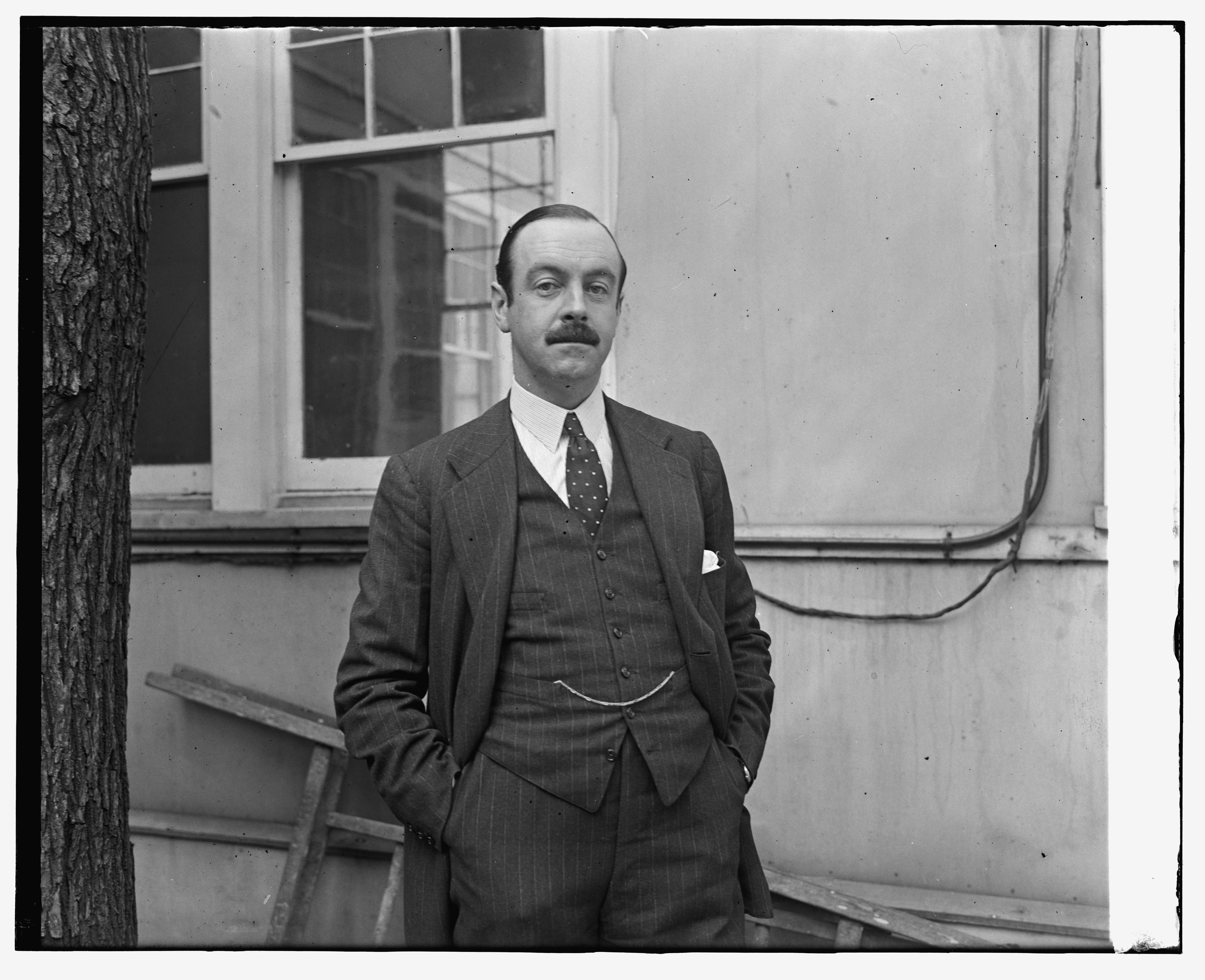
- Born: 30 June 1890; London, England
- Died: 22 October 1954 (aged 64); Asheville, North Carolina, US
- Education: Oxford University
- Spouse: Cornelia Stuyvesant Vanderbilt (m. 1924; div. 1934)
- Children: George Henry Vanderbilt Cecil; William Amherst Vanderbilt Cecil
- Parent(s): Lord William Cecil; 2nd Baroness Amherst of Hackney
- Relatives: 3rd Marquess of Exeter (grandfather); 1st Baron Amherst of Hackney (grandfather)

John Francis Amherst Cecil (30 June 1890 – 22 October 1954) was the first secretary of the British Embassy, Washington, known for his marriage to Cornelia Stuyvesant Vanderbilt.

== Early life ==
John Francis Amherst Cecil was born on 30 June 1890 in London, England. He was the third son of Lord William Cecil (1854–1943) and Mary Rothes Margaret Tyssen-Amherst, 2nd Baroness Amherst of Hackney (1857–1919). After the death of his mother in 1919, his father remarried to Violet Maud (née Freer) Collyer.

As his eldest brother, Capt. William Amherst Cecil, predeceased their mother, William's eldest son, succeeded their mother as the 3rd Baron Amherst of Hackney.

His father, a Groom-in-Waiting to Queen Victoria until her death in 1901 and an Extra Gentleman Usher from 1924 under King George V until 1937, was a younger son of the William Cecil, 3rd Marquess of Exeter and Lady Georgina Sophia Pakenham, the daughter of Thomas Pakenham, 2nd Earl of Longford. His maternal grandfather was William Tyssen-Amherst, 1st Baron Amherst of Hackney.

He attended Eton College and Oxford University.

== Career ==
He became the first secretary of the British Embassy in Washington in 1923. After his marriage in 1924, he resigned from his diplomatic post and moved to Biltmore, North Carolina.

== Personal life ==
In 1924, he married Cornelia Stuyvesant Vanderbilt at All Souls Cathedral in Biltmore Village. Cornelia was the only child of the late George Washington Vanderbilt II and the former Edith Stuyvesant Dresser. The following year, Cornelia's mother married Peter Goelet Gerry, a U.S. Senator from Rhode Island, in London. Together, Cornelia and John were the parents of two children:

- George Henry Vanderbilt Cecil (1925–2020), who married Nancy Owen (1930–2016).
- William Amherst Vanderbilt Cecil (1928–2017) who married Mary Lee Ryan (1931–2017), a first cousin of First Lady Jackie Kennedy, as their mothers, Janet Norton Lee and Marion Merritt Lee, were sisters.

Around 1932, reportedly finding life at Biltmore too dull, his wife moved to New York City to study art, leaving Cecil to manage Biltmore. A few months later, she moved to Paris where she divorced him in 1934, dyed her hair bright pink, and changed her name to Nilcha. After her 1934 move abroad, she never returned to Biltmore or the United States again. After Paris, she moved to London, where she met and married Captain Vivian Francis Bulkeley-Johnson in October 1949. Bulkeley-Johnson, the aide-de-camp to the 9th Duke of Devonshire when he was the Governor General of Canada from 1916 to 1918, served in the offices of the Imperial War Cabinet in World War I and in the Air Ministry. They remained married until his death in 1968.

After they divorced in 1934, Cecil remained in Biltmore, and he died on 22 October 1954 in Asheville, North Carolina.
