= Mary Cecil, 2nd Baroness Amherst of Hackney =

English peeress

The Right Honourable The Baroness Amherst of Hackney OBE
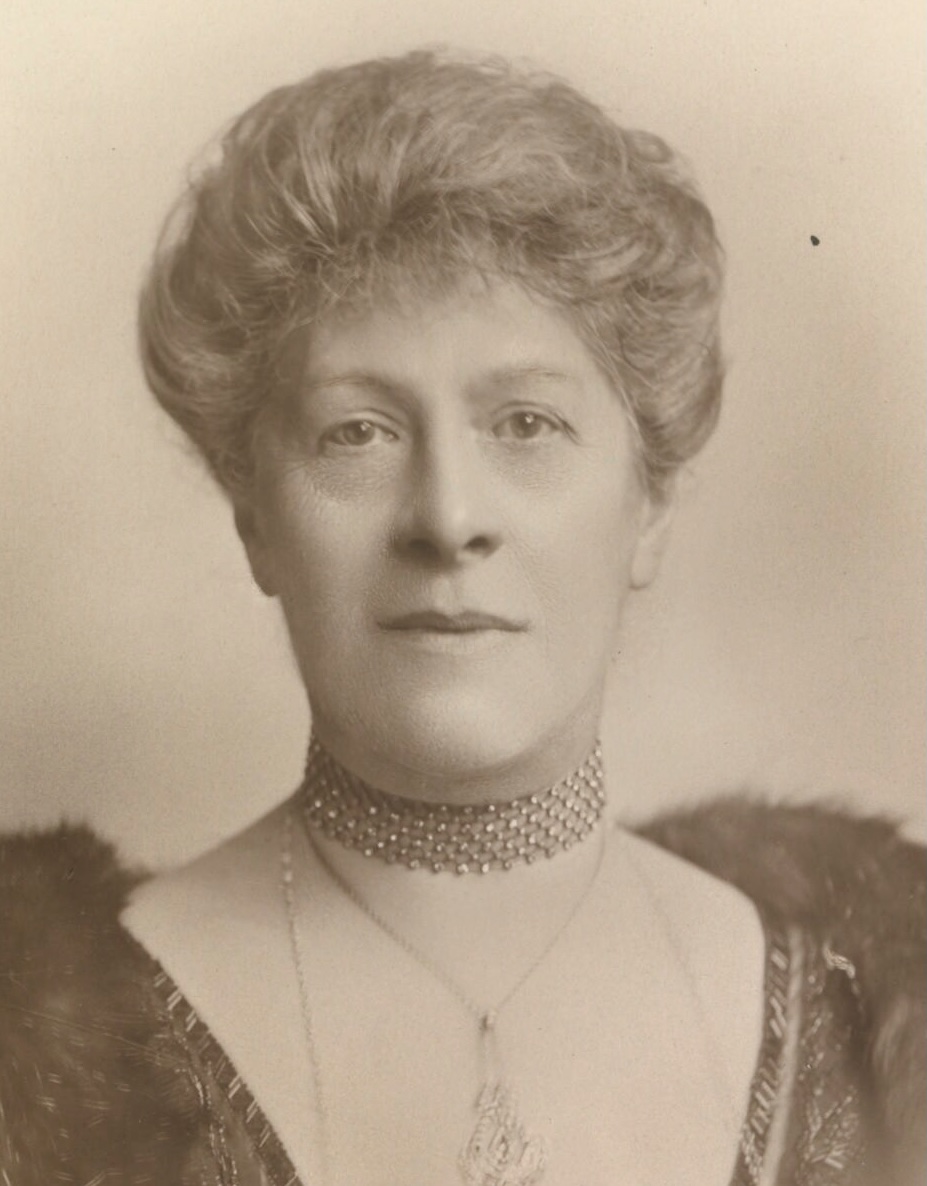
- 1919 upon receipt of her OBE
- Other names: Lady William Cecil
- Known for: Excavations in Qubbet el-Hawa and various birding books
- Years active: 1901–1919
- Born: Mary Rothes Margaret Tyssen-Amherst; 25 April 1857; Didlington Hall, Norfolk, England
- Died: 21 December 1919 (aged 62); London, England
- Spouse: Lord William Cecil (m. 1885)
- Issue: William Cecil; Thomas James Cecil; John Francis Cecil; Henry Mitford Cecil
- Father: William Tyssen-Amherst, 1st Baron Amherst of Hackney
- Mother: Margaret Susan Mitford

Mary Rothes Margaret Cecil, 2nd Baroness Amherst of Hackney, OBE (née Mary Rothes Margaret Tyssen-Amherst; 25 April 1857 – 21 December 1919, also known as Lady William Cecil) was a British hereditary peer, charity worker, amateur archaeologist and ornithologist. Thirty-two of the Tombs of the Nobles at Aswan were uncovered in her excavations and for many years were known as the "Cecil Tombs". She was one of the few English women to have held a peerage in her own right. The black crowned crane, Balearica pavonia ceciliae was named in her honour.

== Early life ==
Mary Rothes Margaret Tyssen-Amherst, known as "May" to her family, was born on 25 April 1857 in Didlington Hall near Swaffham in west Norfolk, England to Margaret Susan (née Mitford) and William Amhurst Tyssen-Amhurst (1835–1909) (which was changed to the surname Tyssen-Amherst in 1877). Descending of wealthy Flemish traders, the Tyssen family acquired estates in Hackney and Norfolk, leading to a wide circle of friends and monetary influence. Her father, was a collector of books and antique artefacts, with a strong interest in Egyptian antiquities. He had large collections of books and manuscripts, many on the history of bookbinding and printing, and his collection of artefacts was at one time the third largest in England.

May's mother was known for her wood carving skill, with her handiworks adorning Didlington Hall, as well as her needle skills, as an amateur surgeon. Her maternal grandfather, Admiral Robert Mitford, besides serving in the Royal Navy, was a naturalist who had studied engraving techniques and illustrated birds.

As did her six younger sisters, May studied at home, learning painting, music and domestic arts, as well as horsemanship. The sisters were also taught the importance of childhood education, caring for the poor and sick and the need to tend to building institutions which fostered the health and welfare of society. From a young age, she was interested in the collections on Egypt, spending hours in the museum which her father had built in one wing of the house. In 1871, her parents took her with them on her first trip to the country, which was just opening up to tourism. They travelled in the private car of Ottoman Khedive, Isma'il Pasha, rather than by rail and stayed in Shepheard's Hotel, making excursions to the pyramids, Saqqara, and Suez. May sketched birds, rode on donkeys and ponies, and, in addition to touring and camping, attended a performance of Aida at the Khedivial Opera House and roamed the gardens and rooms of Inji Hanimefendi's palace.

In 1891, Howard Carter and his father Samuel visited Didlington Hall to study the artefacts at the estate's museum. The two were known for their illustrations and drawings and were acquaintances of the family. Lady Margaret, who was impressed by young Howard's talent, assisted in arranging an apprenticeship for him from the Egypt Exploration Fund, as a tracer of drawings and inscriptions.

=== Peerage ===
In 1892, May's father, who by then had served several terms as member of the House of Commons became the 1st Baron Amherst of Hackney. As he had no male heirs, a special remainder granted that May (now known as Lady William Cecil) would succeed him as the 2nd Baron (i.e. Baroness) to pass the title on to her male heirs.

In 1909, when her father died suddenly, Lady William Cecil succeeded him suo jure under the special remainder previously attained, as the 2nd Baron(ess) Amherst of Hackney, but his residual estate had been reduced to £341, as most of his personal collections and estate had been sold to pay off debt, when he was defrauded by his solicitor.

== Career ==
=== Archaeology and Cecil Tombs ===
Despite that it was unusual for women to participate in archaeology at the time, in 1901, encouraged by Howard Carter, Lady William Cecil began excavations at Qubbet el-Hawa near Aswan. Her family was wintering in the area and while exploring on the west bank of the Nile had discovered what she thought might be an ancient cemetery. Carter, who in 1899 had been appointed by the Antiquities Service as one of two European Chief Inspectors and in charge of excavations in the Nile Valley south from Qus to the Sudanese border, came to see the find the following day. He arranged for permits to excavate and provided an inspector and workers to assist in the dig. She kept a diary of the details of the expedition in which multiple tombs were found, as well as wooden anthropoid coffins of the Saite Era. Though the entire necropolis was infested with termites, Tomb 21 yielded two burial boxes. The male's coffin disintegrated when it was touched, but the female's coffin remained intact and was removed. The exterior was painted in yellow and devoid of any inscription. The mummy was covered with a blue network of beading. A coarse blue glaze was used on the winged scarabs and Amenti gods depicted on the canopic jars. The sole adornment of the mummy was a one inch by half inch opaque green stone. Lady William's diary recorded that the names found in the tomb were Bao-bao, daughter of Pawebas and Shepentanefet and her brother Waher. She also reported remnants of a former burial, which may have been the tomb of Shepentanefret.

In all, Lady William Cecil uncovered thirty-two tombs at the site which became known as the "Cecil Tombs", and were later called the Tombs of the Nobles or Qubbet el-Hawa. Her discovery of the tomb of Heqata was described as a small chamber, with two earthenware pots and containing a square coffin upon which were a bow and some arrow tips, as well as three walking sticks. Inside the coffin, on a trellis-shaped frame filled with grids of dirt, lay the mummy of Heqata. The mummy was full of weevils, but was encased in seven layers of finely woven cloth. Though there were no artefacts found with the mummy, the exterior wrapping was painted white about the face with a painted necklace. In many of the tombs, Lady William reported that they appeared to be re-used, and her finds suggest the artefacts came from a diverse range of dynasties. The excavations proved successful and though Carter took "some of the best things", both he and Gaston Maspero were pleased with the endeavour.

=== Author ===
Returning home, Lady William Cecil published her findings "Report on the Work Done at Aswan" in the Annales du Service des Antiquités de l'Égypte in 1903. In December, 1903, Lord and Lady William Cecil attended Princess Henry of Battenburg to return to Egypt, having been members of her household for many years. Her second season was not as productive and her work was overshadowed by a discovery made on Elephantine Island of a papyrus engagement contract. The document, in Aramaic script, contained important descriptions of the fortress and city of Aswan in the era of Artaxerxes I and Darius II and Lady William worked diligently with Howard Carter and others to try to get it published. In 1904, she published Bird Notes from the Nile, which she offered for sale to benefit the parish church of St Mary's Church in Scarborough, North Yorkshire. The book inspired the black crowned crane, Balearica pavonia ceciliae to be named in her honour. Other charitable works Lady William supported included the Children's Invalid Aid Fund; London's Queen's Hospital for Children, for which she was one of only two women directors; and the ambulance and hospital works of the Order of Saint John of Jerusalem, for which she also served as a Lady Justice. Lady William and her husband spent the next several years travelling, visiting Australia in 1905.

=== Lady-in-waiting ===
In 1906, they were in Madrid, where Lady William served as the only English lady-in-waiting attending Victoria Eugenie of Battenberg, Princess Henry's daughter, when she became Spanish queen. That same year at the request of the Empress Dowager Cixi, Lord and Lady William Cecil went with an English committee to help organise schools for Chinese girls. They returned with Princess Henry and her entourage to Spain the following year, as well.

=== World War I ===
During World War I, Lady Amherst participated in projects to raise funds for various war works, including an exhibition of her own paintings of Egyptian scenes at the Dudley Galleries and a fundraiser at the Royal School of Needlework. Her son and heir, Captain William Amherst Cecil was killed at the Battle of the Aisne on 16 September 1914. She was made an Officer of the Order of the British Empire (OBE) in 1919 for her charitable works with several governmental offices dealing with sanitation and health.

== Marriage and children ==
On 2 September 1885, May married Colonel Lord William Cecil (1854–1943), son of William Cecil, 3rd Marquess of Exeter. The couple had four sons:

- Captain Hon William Amherst Cecil (30 June 1886 – 16 September 1914), killed in action at the Battle of the Aisne. He is buried at Soupir Communal Cemetery. He married in 1910 Gladys Evelyn Baggallay, with whom he had two sons including William Alexander Evering Cecil, 3rd Baron Amherst of Hackney (31 May 1912 – 22 July 1980).
- Captain Hon Thomas James Cecil (9 November 1887 – 4 October 1955)
- Hon John Francis Amherst Cecil (30 June 1890 – 22 October 1954), married Cornelia Vanderbilt, daughter of George Washington Vanderbilt II, and had issue, George Henry Vanderbilt Cecil and William Amherst Vanderbilt Cecil
- Commander Hon Henry Mitford Amherst Cecil (9 March 1893 – 6 January 1962)

== Death and legacy ==
Barely a month after her own mother died, Lady Amherst died on 20 December 1919 in London at the age of 62. She was succeeded in the barony by her grandson, William.

The coffin of Bao-bao was sold upon her death via a sale organised by Sotheby's in June 1921 to Albert M. Todd. In 1932, Todd presented the piece to the Kalamazoo Public Museum (now the Kalamazoo Valley Museum). The Sotheby's sale was described as "the most important sale of Egyptian antiquities ever held in England" to that point in time and included 917 lots of Egyptian artefacts and 47 lots of cuneiform tablets and other objects. Lady Amherst's journal on her first trip to Egypt is part of the records kept in Biltmore House in Asheville, North Carolina. Her notes and letters have been useful references for other archaeologists in tracking provenance of objects which were part of the family collections and because the tombs she inspected have not fully been subsequently explored.

== Selected works ==
- Cecil, Lady William (1903). "Report on the Work Done at Aswan". Annales du Service des Antiquités de l'Égypte. 4. Cairo, Egypt: Institut Français d'Archéologie Orientale: 51–73. OCLC 850981649.
- Amherst, baroness, Mary Rothes Margaret Tyssen-Amherst Cecil (1904). Bird Notes from the Nile. Westminster, England: Archibald Constable & Co., Ltd. OCLC 6714852.
- Amherst of Hackney, Lady Mary Rothes Margaret Tyssen-Amherst Cecil (1904). A sketch of Egyptian history from the earliest times to the present day. London, England: Methuen & Co. OCLC 657400148.
- Cecil, Lady William (1905). "Report on the Work Done at Aswan during the First Months of 1904". Annales du Service des Antiquités de l'Égypte. 6. Cairo, Egypt: Institut Français d'Archéologie Orientale: 273–283.
- Cecil, Baroness Amherst, Lady William (1911). Catalogue of rare & valuable books and manuscripts, from the famous Amherst Library, the property of Lady William Cecil, Baroness Amherst of Hackney. London, England: Sotheby, Wilkinson & Hodge. OCLC 250632306.
- Cecil, Lady William (December 1916). "Notes on a few American Warblers". Avicultural Magazine. 8 (1). Radstock, England: Avicultural Society of Great Britain.
- Cecil, Lady William (March 1917). "Notes on Some of the Vireos (or Greenlets) of North America". Avicultural Magazine. 8 (5). Radstock, England: Avicultural Society of Great Britain.

Peerage of the United Kingdom
Preceded by William Tyssen-Amherst	Baroness Amherst of Hackney; 1909–1919	Succeeded by William Cecil
