= Biltmore Farms =

American dairy farm

- Industry: Community development
- Founded: 1897
- Founder: George Washington Vanderbilt II
- Headquarters: Asheville, North Carolina
- Website: www.biltmorefarms.com

Founded in 1897 by George Washington Vanderbilt II, Biltmore Farms has evolved from one of the Southeast's largest independent dairy producer to a community development firm. Son of William Henry Vanderbilt and grandson of Cornelius Vanderbilt, George W. Vanderbilt pioneered sustainable land-use practices when he moved from New York to the Southern Appalachian Mountains near Asheville, North Carolina, where he built his famed Biltmore Estate, America's largest residence.

== History ==
Based on his passion for creating sustainable forestry and agricultural practices, Vanderbilt launched Biltmore Dairy Farms as an internal operation on his estate, with surplus milk being donated to local Asheville hospitals. As productivity increased, the company expanded into home delivery and wholesale supply to area hotels, then part of Western North Carolina's nascent tourism industry. Imported from the UK (specifically from the Channel Islands), Jersey cows, known for producing high-quality milk, comprised the original Biltmore Farms herd. Biltmore cattle were regularly awarded blue ribbons at the National Jersey Shows, and several even earned grand champion titles. One notable Biltmore Farms cow, Financial Madame Bess, was recognized for producing 21,000 lb (9,500 kg). of milk in one ten-month period, which was a national record at the time. Biltmore Signal Bess Jane was also recognized, earning the title of Grand Champion Cow in both 1951 and 1952 at the National Jersey Shows. The year 1952 also marked bull Dandy Royal’s win of a Grand Champion title, setting a new record by being bred, owned and exhibited by the same entity. The record stands unbeaten today.

In 1979, a corporate reorganization made Biltmore Farms a separate entity from The Biltmore Company, which operates the Vanderbilt's estate house, gardens, and winery. Under the leadership of Vanderbilt's grandson George H. V. Cecil, the dairy operation grew throughout the latter half of the twentieth century to serve customers in five states: North Carolina, South Carolina, Tennessee, Georgia, and Virginia. Biltmore Dairy Bars and milk delivery trucks became iconic symbols. One can still visit the original dairy barn, which has been converted into the Biltmore Winery.

== The end of actual farming ==
Due to changing trends in the market, the dairy business was sold to Pet, Inc. in 1985, though Biltmore Farms still maintains a herd of Jersey cattle in Mills River, North Carolina, just south of Asheville. The pedigrees of many of these cows can still be traced to the original nineteenth-century herd.

Biltmore Farms transformed itself into a community development firm. The company's present day divisions, operated by more than 140 employees, focus on hotels, commercial real estate, home building, and master planned communities. The company's first foray into real estate development began after Pet, Inc. vacated the dairy processing plant just outside the Biltmore Estate gates. Adaptive reuse transformed the building into a full-service hotel operation, now branded as The Doubletree Biltmore Hotel, a member of the Hilton Hotels Family. The hotel features a museum of the company's agricultural legacy, and the adjacent T.G.I. Friday's restaurant was the original location of the Asheville Dairy Bar.

== Current Business ==
John F. A. V. “Jack” Cecil was promoted to company president in 1992 and has focused its ventures on his five tenets of community development: healthcare, education, economic development, quality of life and the environment, and the arts and crafts of the region. Business includes:

- Biltmore Farms Communities
- Biltmore Lake - a community surrounding a 62-acre lake in Western North Carolina.
- Biltmore Park - a community located in south Asheville, North Carolina. 550 homes surrounds the Urban Village, Biltmore Park Town Square.
- Biltmore Farms Homes - the company's homebuilding subsidiary builds in several Asheville and Hendersonville, North Carolina, area communities including Biltmore Lake, Southcliff, and Fox Run Preserve.
- Biltmore Farms Hotels
- Biltmore Farms Commercial - the company has a variety of commercial real estate interests, including leasing and property management. Among the commercial group's largest focus is Biltmore Park Town Square, Asheville, North Carolina.
