= George H. V. Cecil =

American businessman (1925–2020)

- Born: George Henry Vanderbilt Cecil; February 27, 1925; Biltmore House, Asheville, North Carolina
- Died: October 19, 2020 (aged 95); Buncombe County, North Carolina
- Education: University of Edinburgh
- Known for: Owner of Biltmore Farms
- Spouse: Nancy Owen
- Children: 6
- Parent(s): John Francis Amherst Cecil; Cornelia Stuyvesant Vanderbilt
- Relatives: George Washington Vanderbilt II (grandfather); Lord William Cecil (grandfather); Mary Cecil, 2nd Baroness Amherst of Hackney (grandmother); William Amherst Vanderbilt Cecil (brother)

George Henry Vanderbilt Cecil (February 27, 1925 – October 19, 2020) was an American businessman who was the owner and chairman of Biltmore Farms.

== Biography ==
George was the first of two sons born to John Francis Amherst Cecil (1890–1954) and Cornelia Stuyvesant Vanderbilt (1900–1976) and was the grandson of George Washington Vanderbilt II, the founder of the Biltmore Estate. He was educated in Europe, attended the University of Edinburgh, and served in the Royal Navy during World War II. Upon the death of his mother, Cornelia Stuyvesant Vanderbilt, George was given the choice of taking over Biltmore Farms (the family dairy) or the Estate.

Leaving the estate for his younger brother William Amherst Vanderbilt Cecil, George chose to take ownership of Biltmore Farms which, at the time, was much more profitable. Biltmore Farms had continued to grow under George's management, transforming it into a profitable real estate business that serves the Asheville area.

== Personal life ==
Cecil was a direct descendant of both William Henry Vanderbilt and, on his father's side, William Cecil, the chief adviser to Queen Elizabeth I in the 16th century, through his grandparents, Lord William Cecil and Mary Rothes Margaret Cecil, Baroness Amherst of Hackney.

He married Nancy Owen Cecil and together they had six children: John ("Jack") F. A. V. Cecil, Edith Ann Cecil, Catherine Cecil Taylor, Margaret Cecil Sinnott, Louisa Cecil Harrison, and Christopher Cecil. His elder son, John F. A. V. Cecil, is currently the president of Biltmore Farms.

Cecil was born at Biltmore House in Asheville, North Carolina. He died in October 2020 at the age of 95. His wife Nancy predeceased him.

== Ancestry ==
Ancestors of George H. V. Cecil

16. Brownlow Cecil, 2nd Marquess of Exeter
8. William Cecil, 3rd Marquess of Exeter
17. Isabella Poyntz
4. Lord William Cecil
18. Thomas Pakenham, 2nd Earl of Longford
9. Lady Georgina Pakenham
19. Lady Georgiana Emma Charlotte Lygon
2. Hon. John Francis Amherst Cecil
20. William George Daniel-Tyssen
10. William Tyssen-Amherst, 1st Baron Amherst of Hackney
21. Mary Fountaine
5. Mary Tyssen-Amherst, 2nd Baroness Amherst of Hackney
22. Adm. Robert Mitford
11. Margaret Susan Mitford
23. Margaret Dunsmore
1. George Henry Vanderbilt Cecil
24. Cornelius Vanderbilt
12. William Henry Vanderbilt
25. Sophia Johnson
6. George Washington Vanderbilt II
26. Rev. Samuel Kissam
13. Maria Louisa Kissam
27. Margaret Hamilton Adams
3. Cornelia Stuyvesant Vanderbilt
28. George Andrew Dresser
14. Maj. George Warren Dresser
29. Hannah Brown
7. Edith Stuyvesant Dresser
30. Daniel LeRoy
15. Susan Fish LeRoy
31. Susan Elizabeth Fish

== See also ==
- Biltmore Farms Biography
- Biltmore Estate History
