= Baron Amherst of Hackney =

Title in the Peerage of the United Kingdom

Barony Amherst of Hackney
- Creation date: 26 August 1892
- Created by: Queen Victoria
- Peerage: Peerage of the United Kingdom
- First holder: William Tyssen-Amherst
- Present holder: Hugh William Amherst Cecil, 5th Baron
- Heir apparent: Jack William Amherst Cecil
- Remainder to: the 1st Baron's heirs male of the body lawfully begotten, with special remainder, failing heirs male of his body, to his eldest daughter, wife of Lord William Cecil, and the heirs male of her body.

Jockey Colours for Lord Amherst of Hackney

Baron Amherst of Hackney (/ˈæmərst/), in the County of London, is a title in the Peerage of the United Kingdom. It was created on 26 August 1892 for the former Conservative Member of Parliament William Tyssen-Amherst, with remainder, in default of male issue, to his eldest daughter Mary and her issue male. Tyssen-Amherst had previously represented West Norfolk and South West Norfolk in the House of Commons. He was succeeded according to the special remainder by his daughter Mary. She was the wife of Colonel Lord William Cecil, third son of William Cecil, 3rd Marquess of Exeter. As of 2017 the title is held by their great-great-grandson, the fifth Baron, who succeeded his father in 2009. As a male-line descendant of the third Marquess of Exeter he is also in remainder to this peerage and its subsidiary titles the earldom of Exeter and barony of Burghley.

Rear Admiral Sir Nigel Cecil was the son of Henry Mitford Amherst Cecil, fourth son of the second Baroness and Lord William Cecil. The champion racehorse trainer Sir Henry Cecil was the son of Henry Cecil, a younger brother of the third Baron.

The family seat now is Hawthorn House, near Lymington, Hampshire.

A cadet branch owns Biltmore Estate (U.S.A.)

== Coat of arms ==
The heraldic blazon for the coat of arms of the barony is: Quarterly: 1st and 4th, barry of ten argent and azure, six escutcheons three two and one sable each charged with a lion rampant argent, a mullet for difference (for Cecil); 2nd and 3rd, gules three tilting spears two and one or headed argent (for Amherst).

== Barons Amherst of Hackney (1892) ==
- William Amhurst Tyssen-Amherst, 1st Baron Amherst of Hackney (1835–1909)
- Mary Rothes Margaret Cecil, 2nd Baroness Amherst of Hackney (1857–1919)
- William Alexander Evering Cecil, 3rd Baron Amherst of Hackney (1912–1980)
- William Hugh Amherst Cecil, 4th Baron Amherst of Hackney (1940–2009)
- Hugh William Amherst Cecil, 5th Baron Amherst of Hackney (b. 1968)

The heir apparent is the present holder's son, the Hon. Jack William Amherst Cecil (b. 2001).

== See also ==
- Marquess of Exeter
- Baron Rockley
- Marquess of Salisbury
- Viscount Cecil of Chelwood
- Baron Quickswood
- Viscount Wimbledon
