= George Washington Vanderbilt II =

American art collector (1862–1914)

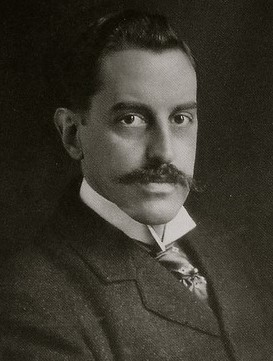
- Born: November 14, 1862; New Dorp, New York, U.S.
- Died: March 6, 1914 (aged 51); Washington, D.C., U.S.
- Resting place: Vanderbilt Family Mausoleum, Staten Island, New York, U.S.
- Known for: Biltmore Estate
- Spouse: Edith Stuyvesant Dresser (m. 1898)
- Children: Cornelia Stuyvesant Vanderbilt
- Parent(s): William Henry Vanderbilt; Maria Louisa Kissam
- Relatives: Vanderbilt family

George Washington Vanderbilt II (November 14, 1862 – March 6, 1914) was an American art collector and member of the prominent Vanderbilt family, which amassed a huge fortune through steamboats, railroads, and various business enterprises. He commissioned the construction of a 250-room mansion, the largest privately owned home in the United States, which he named Biltmore Estate.

== Biography ==
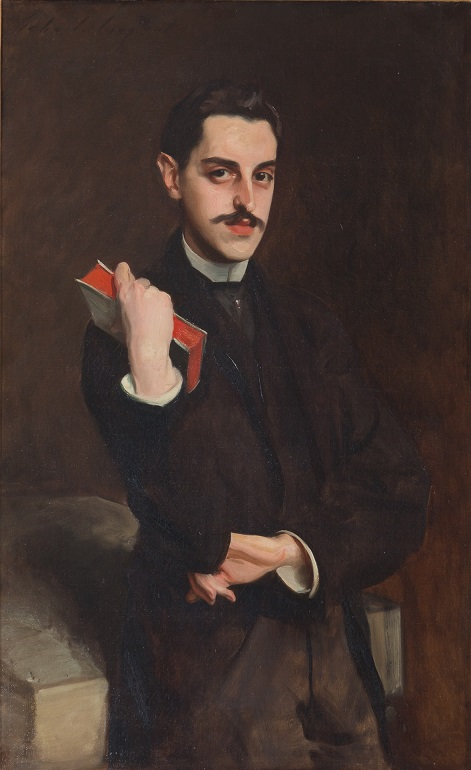
George Washington Vanderbilt, John Singer Sargent, 1890.

George W. Vanderbilt II was the youngest of William Henry Vanderbilt's and Maria Louisa Kissam's (1821–1896) nine children. Though there is no evidence to suggest that he referred to himself using a numerical suffix, various sources have called him both George Washington Vanderbilt II and III. Biltmore recognizes him as George W. Vanderbilt III, because he had two uncles by that name, the first of whom died at the age of four.

As the youngest of William's children, George was said to be his father's favorite and his constant companion. Relatives described him as slender, dark-haired, and pale-complexioned. Shy and introverted, his interests ran to philosophy, books, and the collection of paintings in his father's large art gallery. He acquired a private library of more than twenty thousand volumes. At twelve years old, George started to write extensive notes and logs on the books he read. George continued to collect and catalog his books throughout his life. In addition to frequent visits to Paris, France, where several Vanderbilts kept homes, George Vanderbilt traveled extensively and became fluent in several languages.

His father owned elegant mansions in New York City and Newport, and an 800-acre (3.2 km^{2}) country estate on Long Island. When William died in 1885 of a stroke, he left a fortune of approximately $200 million, the bulk of which was split between his two elder sons, Cornelius Vanderbilt II and William K. Vanderbilt. George W. Vanderbilt had inherited $2 million from his grandfather and received another million dollars on his 21st birthday from his father. Upon his father's death, he inherited $5 million more, as well as the income from a $5 million trust fund.

He ran the family farm at New Dorp and Woodland Beach, now the neighborhood of Midland Beach, on Staten Island, New York, where he was born, then lived with his mother in Manhattan until his own townhouse at 9 West 53rd Street was completed in 1887. The Vanderbilt family business was operated by his elder brothers. This left him time for intellectual pursuits. In 1891, he joined the New York Society of the Sons of the American Revolution. The next year Vanderbilt gifted his private gallery on 58th Street in Manhattan to the American Fine Arts Society. During the early 1900s, the Vanderbilts developed a pair of residences at 645 and 647 Fifth Avenue. George was the first owner of number 647.

== Biltmore ==
Living in one or another of his family residences well into adulthood, Vanderbilt decided to construct his own country mansion and estate in 1888. For this purpose, he acquired 125,000 acres of woodland in North Carolina, employing the architect Richard Morris Hunt to design a limestone house modeled on the Château de Blois and other châteaux of the Loire Valley in France. With up to four acres of floor space, this is believed to be the largest domestic dwelling ever constructed in the United States.

At Biltmore, Vanderbilt led the life of a country gentleman. Having a great interest in horticulture and agriscience, he oversaw experiments in scientific farming, animal bloodline breeding, and silviculture (forestry). His goal was to run Biltmore as a self-sustaining estate. In 1892, Frederick Law Olmsted suggested that Vanderbilt hire Gifford Pinchot to manage the forests on the estate. According to Pinchot, who went on to be the first Chief of the United States Forest Service, Biltmore was the first professionally managed forest in the U.S. It was also the site of the Biltmore School of Forestry, the first such school in North America, established in 1898 by Dr. Carl A. Schenck.

George Washington Vanderbilt was known for his generosity toward his employees at Biltmore. Every year, he held a Christmas celebration for their children, complete with a decorated tree and presents for each child, even those who could not attend. He also paid all the expenses of the Cathedral of All Souls, an Episcopal cathedral he built and was a parishioner of, located directly across from the Biltmore Estate's main gate in Biltmore Village (the model village he had built for those who worked to build the Estate or were employed on the Estate) so the church's weekly collection could go directly to charity and outreach.

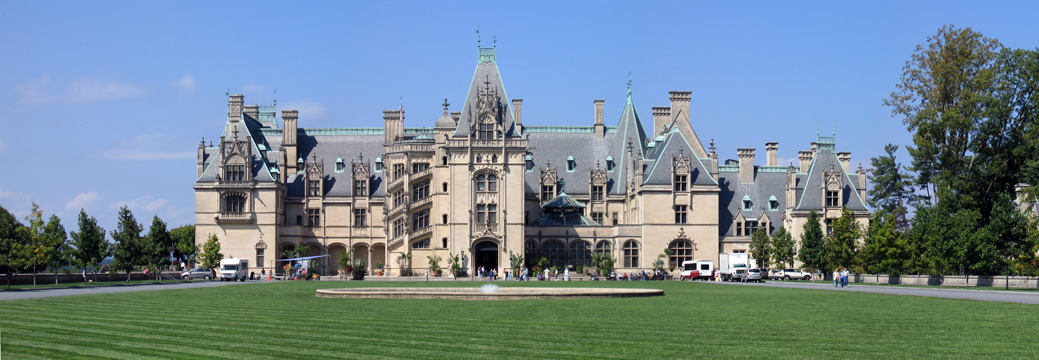
The Biltmore Estate in 2006.

== Family ==
On June 1, 1898, George Washington Vanderbilt married Edith Stuyvesant Dresser (January 17, 1873 – December 21, 1958) at the American Cathedral in Paris, France. George and Edith had one daughter together, Cornelia Stuyvesant Vanderbilt (August 22, 1900 – February 7, 1976).

In 1912, George and Edith booked passage on the doomed Titanic, but they changed their plans at the last minute via telephone, instead sailing on her sister ship, Olympic. Olympic left port before Titanic, and the Vanderbilts arrived in New York before the sinking. Accounts vary, but it has been suggested that a family member (reportedly his wife's well-travelled sister) warned the pair from travelling on Titanic, saying, "so many things can go wrong on a maiden voyage". It's possible the warning was acknowledged and heeded. In any case, Edith, in a letter to her friend Emily Ford Skeel (sister of Paul Leicester Ford), explained: "For no reason whatsoever we decided to sail on the Olympic and had only 18 hours to get ready in. We were homesick, and simply felt we must get home, and changed our ship, as I say, at the Eleventh hour!" Unfortunately, however, a servant to the Vanderbilts, Edwin "Fred" Wheeler, perished aboard Titanic in second class, as, due to the close timing of their switch, the Vanderbilts were forced to leave most of their luggage aboard Titanic, and so Wheeler retained his ticket to travel with it.

== Death ==
George Washington Vanderbilt died of complications following an appendectomy in Washington, D.C., on March 6, 1914. He was interred in the Vanderbilt family mausoleum at the Moravian Cemetery in New Dorp in Staten Island, New York.

He died from a pulmonary embolus, a blood clot in the lungs, about 10 days after surgery.

=== Estate ===
In the weeks following Vanderbilt's death, contemporary reports in newspapers such as The New York Times estimated the value of his estate as $50,000,000. In The Vanderbilts and their Fortunes, published in 1962, historian Edwin Palmer Hoyt dismisses such "reckless newspaper estimates", noting that aside from the $5,000,000 trust fund George had received under the will of his father, his net personal estate (excluding real estate) was valued at approximately $900,000, of which only $11,000 comprised stocks and bonds.

Under the terms of his will, the bulk of his estate was left to his widow and daughter:

- His widow Edith Vanderbilt received $250,000 outright, and a life interest in the income from a $1,000,000 trust fund established under the will, as well as 30 acres of real estate at Bar Harbour, George's house in Washington, his jewellery and other personal effects, and the 80,000-acre Pisgah Forrest in North Carolina.
- His daughter Cornelia Vanderbilt received the $5,000,000 trust fund which had been bequeathed from in his own father's will.

The residuary estate, including Biltmore House, was to be held in trust for Cornelia's benefit until her 25th birthday, after which it would vest into her absolute ownership.

George's property in North Carolina was assessed for State Inheritance Taxes by the Buncombe County Clerk of Superior Court in June 1914. His real estate in North Carolina was valued at $2,592,306, whilst his personal estate (including the contents of Biltmore) was valued at $149,715. A later appraisal in September 1914 submitted to the North Carolina Superior Court valued George's North Carolina estate at $4,617,906; the appraiser's report clarified that this higher valuation was based on their assessment of the real estate assets' market value, rather than the values used to assess the property for land tax and rates.

== Legacy ==
After his death, Vanderbilt's widow sold approximately 86,000 acres (350 km^{2}) of the Biltmore property to the United States Forest Service; the average sale price equated to $5 per acre, or $433,500 in total; in doing so, Edith fulfilled her husband's wishes to create the core of Pisgah National Forest. She sold additional land as finances demanded; today, about 8,000 acres (32 km^{2}) remain. Edith Dresser Vanderbilt later married Senator Peter Goelet Gerry of Rhode Island.

The Vanderbilts' only child, Cornelia Stuyvesant Vanderbilt, married a British aristocrat, the Hon. John Francis Amherst Cecil in 1924. Their sons, George Henry Vanderbilt Cecil and William Amherst Vanderbilt Cecil, eventually inherited the property. George Cecil, the elder of the two sons, chose to inherit the majority of the estate's land and the Biltmore Farms Company, which was more profitable than the house at the time. The younger son, William Cecil, was thus left with Biltmore House, and he is credited with preserving the château which (though still privately owned) is open to the public.
