= Vanderbilt (surname) =

Vanderbilt is a surname. Notable people with the surname include:

- Amy Vanderbilt (1908–1974), American authority on etiquette, distant relative of the Vanderbilt family
- Arthur T. Vanderbilt (1888–1957), noted American attorney, legal educator, and proponent of court modernization, Chief Justice of the New Jersey Supreme Court 1948–1957
- John Vanderbilt (1819–1877), American lawyer and politician from New York
- Jarred Vanderbilt (born 1999), American professional basketball player for the Los Angeles Lakers
- The Vanderbilt family, a prominent family in the United States, including:
  - Alfred Gwynne Vanderbilt (1877–1915), wealthy American sportsman, son of Cornelius Vanderbilt II
  - Alfred Gwynne Vanderbilt Jr. (1912–1999), American proponent of thoroughbred racing, son of Alfred Gwynne Vanderbilt
  - Alfred Gwynne Vanderbilt III (born 1949), Business executive, son of Alfred Gwynne Vanderbilt Jr.
  - Alice Vanderbilt Morris (1874–1950), co-founder of the IALA, daughter of Margaret Louisa Vanderbilt Shepard
  - Cathleen Vanderbilt (1904–1944), daughter of Reginald Claypoole Vanderbilt
  - Consuelo Vanderbilt (1877–1964), daughter of William Kissam Vanderbilt, wife of Charles Spencer-Churchill, 9th Duke of Marlborough
  - Cornelia Stuyvesant Vanderbilt (1900–1976), daughter of George Washington Vanderbilt II
  - Cornelius Jeremiah Vanderbilt (1830–1882), son of "Commodore" Cornelius Vanderbilt
  - Cornelius Vanderbilt (1794–1877), known as "Commodore" Vanderbilt, American industrialist and philanthropist, patriarch of the Vanderbilt family; married Frank Armstrong Crawford Vanderbilt
  - Cornelius Vanderbilt II (1843–1899), American socialite, heir, and businessman, son of William Henry Vanderbilt and a grandson of "Commodore" Cornelius Vanderbilt; married Alice Claypoole Vanderbilt
  - Cornelius Vanderbilt III (1873–1942), American military officer, inventor, engineer, and yachtsman, son of Cornelius Vanderbilt II; married Grace Vanderbilt
  - Cornelius Vanderbilt IV (1898–1974), American newspaper publisher, the son of Cornelius Vanderbilt III
  - Cornelius Vanderbilt Whitney (1899–1992), American businessman, film producer, writer, government official, and owner of a leading stable of thoroughbred racehorses, son of Gertrude Vanderbilt Whitney
  - Eliza Osgood Vanderbilt Webb (1860–1936), daughter of William Henry Vanderbilt
  - Emily Thorn Vanderbilt (1852–1946), daughter of William Henry Vanderbilt
  - Emily Vanderbilt Sloane (1874–1970), American philanthropist, daughter of Emily Thorn Vanderbilt
  - Florence Adele Vanderbilt Twombly (1854–1952), daughter of William Henry Vanderbilt
  - Frederick Vanderbilt Field (1905–2000), American leftist political activist, grandson of Emily Thorn Vanderbilt
  - Frederick William Vanderbilt (1856–1938), American railroad director, son of William Henry Vanderbilt; married Louise Vanderbilt
  - George Henry Vanderbilt Cecil (1925–2020), American dairy industry businessman, son of Cornelia Stuyvesant Vanderbilt and grandson of George Washington Vanderbilt II
  - George Washington Vanderbilt II (1862–1914), American businessman, the son of William Henry Vanderbilt
  - George Washington Vanderbilt III (1914–1961), American yachtsman and scientific explorer, a son of Alfred Gwynne Vanderbilt I
  - Gertrude Vanderbilt Whitney (1875–1942), an American sculptor, art patron, and art collector, prominent social figure and hostess, founder of the Whitney Museum of American Art, a daughter of Cornelius Vanderbilt II
  - Gladys Vanderbilt Széchenyi (1886–1965), daughter of Cornelius Vanderbilt II, wife of Hungarian Count László Széchenyi
  - Gloria Vanderbilt (1924–2019), American artist, author, actress, heiress, socialite, and early developer of designer blue jeans, daughter of Reginald Claypoole Vanderbilt
  - Harold Stirling Vanderbilt (1884–1970), American railroad executive, yachtsman, and champion bridge player, a son of William Kissam Vanderbilt; married Gertrude Conaway Vanderbilt.
  - Heidi Vanderbilt (1948–2021), American actress, photographer, and writer, daughter of Alfred Gwynne Vanderbilt Jr.
  - James Vanderbilt (born 1975), American screenwriter, grandson of Alfred Gwynne Vanderbilt Jr.
  - Jeanne Murray Vanderbilt (1919–2013), American socialite, wife of Alfred Gwynne Vanderbilt Jr.
  - Margaret Louisa Vanderbilt Shepard (1845–1924), supporter of the YMCA, daughter of William Henry Vanderbilt
  - Muriel Vanderbilt (1900–1972), American racehorse owner/breeder, daughter of William Kissam Vanderbilt II
  - Reginald Claypoole Vanderbilt (1880–1925), American millionaire equestrian, son of Cornelius Vanderbilt II; married Gloria Morgan Vanderbilt
  - William Amherst Vanderbilt Cecil (1928–2017), American businessman, son of Cornelia Stuyvesant Vanderbilt and grandson of George Washington Vanderbilt II
  - William Henry Vanderbilt (1821–1885), American businessman, son of "Commodore" Cornelius Vanderbilt
  - William Henry Vanderbilt III (1901–1981), American bus executive and Rhode Island politician, Governor of Rhode Island 1939–1941, son of Alfred Gwynne Vanderbilt
  - William Kissam Vanderbilt (1849–1920), American railroad executive and horse breeder, son of William Henry Vanderbilt; married Anne Harriman Vanderbilt
  - William Kissam Vanderbilt II (1878–1944), American motor racing enthusiast and yachtsman, son of William Kissam Vanderbilt; married Virginia Fair Vanderbilt
