= List of The New York Times number-one books of 1967 =

This is a list of books that topped The New York Times best-seller list in 1967.

== Fiction ==
The following list ranks the number-one best-selling fiction books.

Date	Book	Author
January 1	The Secret of Santa Vittoria	Robert Crichton
January 8	The Secret of Santa Vittoria	Robert Crichton
January 15	The Secret of Santa Vittoria	Robert Crichton
January 22	The Secret of Santa Vittoria	Robert Crichton
January 29	The Secret of Santa Vittoria	Robert Crichton
February 5	The Secret of Santa Vittoria	Robert Crichton
February 12	The Secret of Santa Vittoria	Robert Crichton
February 19	The Secret of Santa Vittoria	Robert Crichton
February 26	The Secret of Santa Vittoria	Robert Crichton
March 5	The Secret of Santa Vittoria	Robert Crichton
March 12	The Secret of Santa Vittoria	Robert Crichton
March 19	The Secret of Santa Vittoria	Robert Crichton
March 26	The Arrangement	Elia Kazan
April 2	The Arrangement	Elia Kazan
April 9	The Arrangement	Elia Kazan
April 16	The Arrangement	Elia Kazan
April 23	The Arrangement	Elia Kazan
April 30	The Arrangement	Elia Kazan
May 7	The Arrangement	Elia Kazan
May 14	The Arrangement	Elia Kazan
May 21	The Arrangement	Elia Kazan
May 28	The Arrangement	Elia Kazan
June 4	The Eighth Day	Thornton Wilder
June 11	The Eighth Day	Thornton Wilder
June 18	The Arrangement	Elia Kazan
June 25	The Eighth Day	Thornton Wilder
July 2	The Arrangement	Elia Kazan
July 9	The Eighth Day	Thornton Wilder
July 16	The Arrangement	Elia Kazan
July 23	The Arrangement	Elia Kazan
July 30	The Arrangement	Elia Kazan
August 6	The Arrangement	Elia Kazan
August 13	The Arrangement	Elia Kazan
August 20	The Arrangement	Elia Kazan
August 27	The Arrangement	Elia Kazan
September 3	The Arrangement	Elia Kazan
September 10	The Arrangement	Elia Kazan
September 17	The Arrangement	Elia Kazan
September 24	The Arrangement	Elia Kazan
October 1	The Chosen	Chaim Potok
October 8	The Chosen	Chaim Potok
October 15	Topaz	Leon Uris
October 22	The Chosen	Chaim Potok
October 29	The Gabriel Hounds	Mary Stewart
November 5	The Confessions of Nat Turner	William Styron
November 12	The Confessions of Nat Turner	William Styron
November 19	The Confessions of Nat Turner	William Styron
November 26	The Confessions of Nat Turner	William Styron
December 3	The Confessions of Nat Turner	William Styron
December 10	The Confessions of Nat Turner	William Styron
December 17	The Confessions of Nat Turner	William Styron
December 24	The Confessions of Nat Turner	William Styron
December 31	The Confessions of Nat Turner	William Styron

== Nonfiction ==
The following list ranks the number-one best-selling nonfiction books.

Date	Book	Author
January 1	Rush to Judgment	Mark Lane
January 8	Everything But Money	Sam Levenson
January 15	Everything But Money	Sam Levenson
January 22	Everything But Money	Sam Levenson
January 29	Everything But Money	Sam Levenson
February 5	Everything But Money	Sam Levenson
February 12	Everything But Money	Sam Levenson
February 19	Everything But Money	Sam Levenson
February 26	Everything But Money	Sam Levenson
March 5	Everything But Money	Sam Levenson
March 12	Madame Sarah	Cornelia Otis Skinner
March 19	Madame Sarah	Cornelia Otis Skinner
March 26	Madame Sarah	Cornelia Otis Skinner
April 2	Everything But Money	Sam Levenson
April 9	Madame Sarah	Cornelia Otis Skinner
April 16	Madame Sarah	Cornelia Otis Skinner
April 23	The Death of a President	William Manchester
April 30	The Death of a President	William Manchester
May 7	The Death of a President	William Manchester
May 14	The Death of a President	William Manchester
May 21	The Death of a President	William Manchester
May 28	The Death of a President	William Manchester
June 4	The Death of a President	William Manchester
June 11	The Death of a President	William Manchester
June 18	The Death of a President	William Manchester
June 25	The Death of a President	William Manchester
July 2	Everything But Money	Sam Levenson
July 9	The Death of a President	William Manchester
July 16	Everything But Money	Sam Levenson
July 23	The New Industrial State	John Kenneth Galbraith
July 30	The New Industrial State	John Kenneth Galbraith
August 6	The New Industrial State	John Kenneth Galbraith
August 13	The New Industrial State	John Kenneth Galbraith
August 20	The New Industrial State	John Kenneth Galbraith
August 27	The New Industrial State	John Kenneth Galbraith
September 3	The New Industrial State	John Kenneth Galbraith
September 10	Our Crowd	Stephen Birmingham
September 17	The New Industrial State	John Kenneth Galbraith
September 24	Our Crowd	Stephen Birmingham
October 1	Our Crowd	Stephen Birmingham
October 8	Our Crowd	Stephen Birmingham
October 15	Our Crowd	Stephen Birmingham
October 22	Our Crowd	Stephen Birmingham
October 29	Our Crowd	Stephen Birmingham
November 5	Our Crowd	Stephen Birmingham
November 12	Our Crowd	Stephen Birmingham
November 19	Our Crowd	Stephen Birmingham
November 26	Our Crowd	Stephen Birmingham
December 3	Our Crowd	Stephen Birmingham
December 10	Our Crowd	Stephen Birmingham
December 17	Our Crowd	Stephen Birmingham
December 24	Our Crowd	Stephen Birmingham
December 31	Our Crowd	Stephen Birmingham

== See also ==
- Publishers Weekly list of bestselling novels in the United States in the 1960s
