= Golden Clan =

2020 book by John Corry

Golden Clan : the Murrays, the McDonnells, and the Irish American aristocracy
- First edition
- Author: John Corry
- Publisher: Houghton Mifflin
- Publication date: 1977
- Publication place: US
- Pages: 203
- ISBN: 9780395251461
- OCLC: 924575580
- Dewey Decimal: 929.20973
- LC Class: CS71.M9785

Golden Clan is a non-fiction account of the Murray/ Mc Donnell family of New York, by John Corry, Golden Clan: The Murrays, the McDonnells, & the Irish American Aristocracy, Houghton Mifflin Co.; Boston, 1977. This followed an earlier book by noted chronicler-of-the-wealthy (Our Crowd, The Grandes Dames) Stephen Birmingham Real Lace: America's Irish Rich HarperCollins New York: 1973 in which this family were also the main subjects.

The Murray/ Mc Donnell clan were the children and grandchildren of inventor Thomas E. Murray, an associate of Thomas Edison's, who was an early summer resident of Southampton, Long Island, New York . Due to their wealth, good looks, and sheer size (one branch, the James Mc Donnells, had 14 children; another, the Thomas E. Murray Jr.s, had 11) they were frequently covered in the social news of the New York press, particularly in the Hearst newspapers by gossip columnist 'Cholly Knickerbocker'. Public interest increased when one Mc Donnell married Henry Ford II, and a Murray cousin Alfred G. Vanderbilt II. Unlike the Kennedy family, with whom several of the Mc Donnells were close, none of the family ran for public office. The eldest son of the patriarch- Thomas E. Murray, Jr., was appointed by President Truman to the United States Atomic Energy Commission and his brother John 'Jack' Murray to the Port Authority of New York by Governor Franklin D. Roosevelt. The McDonnell triplex at 910 Fifth Avenue in New York was reputedly the largest in the city. The clan were considered pillars of the New York Archdiocese, and were very close to Cardinal Spellman and Bishop Fulton J. Sheen; when Clare Boothe Luce converted to Catholicism, Bishop Sheen suggested that Anna Murray Mc Donnell serve as her godmother.

The family has pretty much faded from the public spotlight since the collapse of Mc Donnell & Co., the family stock brokerage firm under T. Murray Mc Donnell in 1970. Several family members such as Catherine Murray di Montezemolo were still prominent in Southampton society at the beginning of the 21st Century, and they continued to intermarry with other prominent Catholic families. Peggy Mc Donnell, a daughter of T. Murray Mc Donnell, is the wife of Manhattan District Attorney Cyrus Vance, Jr.

Several other wealthy Irish Catholic families were also discussed in Corry and Birmingham's books, and have been referred to in print as "Golden Clans". Foremost perhaps would be the descendants of Thomas Fortune Ryan. The Grace family, the grandchildren of William R. Grace such as J. Peter Grace, would be another. Also mentioned were F. Scott Fitzgerald's friends Gerald and Sara Murphy; Gerald's father, the founder of Mark Cross Leather Goods, was a Southampton friend of Thomas Murray. Quite a number of these families sent their sons to Portsmouth Abbey School and Canterbury School (Connecticut) and then on to Georgetown University, and their daughters to Convent of the Sacred Heart schools and Manhattanville College.

Many of the Golden Clans lived in apartment buildings on Park Avenue north of 79th Street, close by St. Ignatius Loyola and St. Thomas More churches, causing some people to refer to the area as the "Irish Gold Coast". Wealthy Irish Catholics are no longer clustered in this neighborhood; many of these families moved out to wealthy suburbs like Rye, New York.
