= Heidi Vanderbilt =

American actress, photographer, and writer

- Born: July 20, 1948; New York City, New York, U.S.
- Died: January 31, 2021; Tucson, Arizona, U.S.
- Other names: Heidi Murray; Heidi Harris
- Education: Columbia University
- Occupation(s): actress writer photographer equestrian rancher
- Spouse: Jones Gordon Harris
- Children: 1
- Parent(s): Alfred Gwynne Vanderbilt Jr. (father); Jeanne Lourdes Murray (mother)
- Relatives: Alfred Gwynne Vanderbilt III (brother)

Heidi Lourdes Murray Vanderbilt (July 20, 1948 – January 31, 2021) was an American actress, photographer, equestrian, and writer. She made her Broadway debut in 1965, under the stage name Heidi Murray, in Ruth Gordon's play A Very Rich Woman. In 1983, she received an Edgar Award from the Mystery Writers of America.

== Early life and family ==
Vanderbilt was born on July 20, 1948 to the racehorse owner Alfred Gwynne Vanderbilt Jr. and the socialite Jeanne Lourdes Murray Vanderbilt. She was a member of the prominent Vanderbilt family and the granddaughter of Alfred Gwynne Vanderbilt. Through her mother, she was the great-granddaughter of the inventor Thomas E. Murray and a niece of fashion editor Catherine Murray di Montezemolo.

Vanderbilt was educated at Spence School, Lycée Français de New York, and the Professional Children's School. She continued her studies at the School of General Studies at Columbia University.

== Career ==
Vanderbilt made her Broadway debut, using the stage name Heidi Murray, as Dalphne Bailey in Ruth Gordon's 1965 play A Very Rich Woman at the Belasco Theatre. She retired from the stage to pursue a career in photography.

She published work as a photographer, poet, and author of both nonfiction and fiction. She wrote the novel The Scar Rule. She received the Edgar Award in 1983 from the Mystery Writers of America.

== Personal life ==
In October 1971, she married Jones Gordon Harris, the son of Ruth Gordon and Jed Harris. The ceremony, officiated by New York Supreme Court Justice Theodore R. Kupferman, took place at her family's home in Oyster Bay. Wedding guests included Thornton Wilder and Garson Kanin. She and Harris had one son, Jack Gwynne Emmet Harris.

Vanderbilt lived in New York City, Cleveland, and in Connecticut before moving to Martha's Vineyard in 1978. She lived in Edgartown and then Vineyard Haven until 1994, when she moved to Tucson, Arizona.

Vanderbilt was an accomplished equestrian and horsewoman and raised horses, donkeys, pigs, cats, dogs, and goats at her ranch in Benson, Arizona. She finished the one-hundred-mile-long one-day Tevis Cup ride three times.

She died on January 31, 2021.
