= Kike =

Ethnic slur directed at Jewish people

Kike (/kaɪk/), also known by the euphemism "the K-word", is an ethnic slur directed at Jews. The etymological origin comes from the Yiddish word for circle, קײַקל (kaykl), itself a derivation of the Ancient Greek word κύκλος (kýklos).

== Etymology ==
According to the Oxford English Dictionary, the word may be an alteration of the endings -ki or -ky common in the personal names of Jews in eastern Europe who immigrated to the United States in the early 20th century. A variation or expansion of this theory published in Our Crowd (1967), by Stephen Birmingham, postulates that the term "kike" was coined as a put-down by the assimilated U.S. Jews from Germany to identify eastern European and Russian Jews: "Because many Russian [Jewish] names ended in 'ki', they were called 'kikes'—a German Jewish contribution to the American vernacular. The name then proceeded to be co-opted by non-Jews as it gained prominence in its usage in society, and was later used as a general derogatory slur."

The Encyclopedia of Swearing suggests that Leo Rosten's suggestion is the most likely. He stated that:

The word kike was born on Ellis Island when there were Jewish migrants who were also illiterate (or could not use Latin alphabet letters). When asked to sign the entry-forms with the customary "X", the Jewish immigrants would refuse, because they associated an X with the cross of Christianity. Instead, they drew a circle as the signature on the entry-forms. The Yiddish word for "circle" is kikel (pronounced KY - kel), and for "little circle", kikeleh. Before long the immigration inspectors were calling anyone who signed with an "O" instead of an "X" a kikel or kikeleh or kikee or, finally and succinctly, kike.

The Yiddish word קײַקל (kikel) probably descends from the Ancient Greek word for circle, κύκλος (kyklos). Ironically, this Greek word also gave rise to the name of the Ku Klux Klan, an American hate group.

Compounding the mysterious origin of this term, in 1864 in the United Kingdom the word ike or ikey was used as a derogatory term for Jews, which derived from the name "Isaac", a common Jewish name.

== Usage ==
In a travel report from 1937 for the German-Jewish publication Der Morgen, Joachim Prinz, writing of the situation of Jewish immigrants in the United States, allegedly mentioned the word as being used by Jews to denigrate other Ashkenazi Jews:

Es ist nicht erhebend zu sehen, wie verworren die Vorstellungen sind, wie wenig die Einwanderer gelernt haben, wie glücklich sie teilweise sind, dem Judenschicksal entsprungen zu sein, und wie überheblich sie oft sind. Es macht traurig, daß sie in manchen Kreisen sehr unbeliebt sind, und man wundert sich über die Dummheit derer, die die Ostjuden (von denen sie ja doch gestützt werden!) verächtlich „Kikes‟ nennen ...

It is not uplifting to see how confused the perceptions are, how little the immigrants have learnt, how happy some of them are to have escaped [or: arisen from] the destiny [or: fate] of the Jews, and how haughty many of them are. It is saddening that they are very unpopular in many circles, and bewildering is the stupidity of those who contemptuously call the Eastern Jews (who support them after all!) "kikes" ...

The slur has been spotted at several protests, with a Jewish woman being called that at a Biden fundraiser in 2024. A similar incident happened at California's Occidental College and Pomona College, against which the Anti-Defamation League (ADL) and Brandeis Center for Human Rights Under Law filed Title VI complaints on behalf of the harassed Jewish students.

== See also ==
- Kikeout Mountain (since renamed Kakeout Mountain due to controversy)
- List of common nouns derived from ethnic group names
- List of ethnic slurs
- Profanity
- Yid
- Goy
- Wog

== Sources ==
- Garber, Zev; Hanson, Kenneth L. (2022). Teaching the Shoah: Mandate and Momentum. Cambridge Scholars Publishing. ISBN 978-1-5275-9121-9.
