= Alfred Gwynne Vanderbilt (disambiguation) =

Alfred Gwynne Vanderbilt (1877–1915) was an American businessman from the Vanderbilt family.

Alfred Gwynne Vanderbilt may also refer to:

- Alfred Gwynne Vanderbilt Jr. (1912–1999), American racehorse/racetrack owner and son of the businessman
- Alfred Gwynne Vanderbilt III (born 1949), American public relations executive and son of the racehorse/racetrack owner
