= Montezemolo =

Montezemolo may refer to:

== Places ==
- Montezemolo, Piedmont, a municipality in the province of Cuneo, Italy

== People ==
- Andrea Cordero Lanza di Montezemolo (1925–2007), Italian Roman Catholic cardinal
- Catherine Murray di Montezemolo (1925–2009), American fashion editor
- Giuseppe Cordero Lanza di Montezemolo (1901–1944), Italian soldier and resistance leader during World War II
- Luca Cordero di Montezemolo (born 1947), Italian businessman, former chairman of Ferrari and Fiat
- Massimo Cordero di Montezemolo (1807–1879), Italian politician
- Vittorio Cordero di Montezemolo (1862–1950), Italian aviator
- Vittorio Cordero di Montezemolo (diplomat) (1917–1982), Italian diplomat
