= Our Gang (disambiguation) =

Our Gang was a series of American comedy short films originally released between 1922 and 1944.

Our Gang may also refer to:

- Our Gang (film), 1922 silent short subject
- Our Gang (novel), Philip Roth novel
- "Our Gang" (The Cleveland Show), episode of The Cleveland Show
- Spanky and Our Gang, a 1960s folk-rock band with several charted singles

== See also ==
- Our Crowd, a history book by Stephen Birmingham
- Our Gang personnel, cast and crew of the Our Gang short film series
