= Dad's in Heaven with Nixon =

2010 documentary by Tom Murray

- Directed by: Tom Murray
- Produced by: Jefferson Miller; James Witker
- Cinematography: Jefferson Miller
- Edited by: James Witker
- Production company: Two Sons Productions
- Release date: April 6, 2010
- Running time: 86 minutes
- Country: United States
- Language: English

Dad's in Heaven with Nixon is a 2010 American documentary film produced, directed and written by Tom Murray. It concerns the history of the Murray family and especially of Tom's brother Chris Murray, a man with autism whose paintings of cityscapes, first promoted by family friend Gloria Vanderbilt, have garnered widespread praise. The title refers to Chris' belief that his late father, who loathed Richard Nixon, is now friends in heaven with the former president. Ranging over three generations of Murrays, whose patriarchs struggled with alcoholism and bipolar disorder, the film features subjects ranging from father-son relationships to the Great Depression, from the effects of divorce on families to the cushy lifestyle of the residents of Southampton, New York. The film premiered on Showtime on April 6, 2010.

== Critical reception ==
In a review for The New York Times, Neil Genzlinger commended how the film widens its focus on multiple family members. He wrote, "Thomas Murray weaves these interlocking stories together expertly—and impressively, given that this is his first film—and in doing so also tells a fourth story: his own. Having a child with a disability doesn't affect only the parents in a family; it also affects the siblings, and increasingly so as the parents age out of the picture. The film is being shown as part of Autism Awareness Month, but it is far richer than many of the autism-related works that have been turning up on television in recent years. It is not about a disability, but about a family that has encountered disability, and there’s a big difference."

== See also ==
- Golden Clan, a non-fiction account of the Murray / McDonnell family of New York, by John Corry
- Thomas E. Murray, the great-grandfather of Tom and Christopher Murray
- List of films about autism
