= Christopher Finch-Hatton =

Christopher Finch-Hatton may refer to:

- Christopher Finch-Hatton, 15th Earl of Winchilsea (1911–1950)
- Christopher Finch-Hatton, 16th Earl of Winchilsea (1936–1999)
