= Daniel Finch-Hatton, 17th Earl of Winchilsea =

British hereditary peer

The Right Honourable The Earl of Winchilsea
- Predecessor: Christopher Finch-Hatton, 16th Earl of Winchilsea
- Born: Daniel James Hatfield Finch Hatton; 7 October 1967 (age 59)
- Spouse: Shelley Gillard (m. 1994)
- Issue: Tobias Finch-Hatton, Viscount Maidstone; Hon. Sebastian Finch-Hatton; Lady India Finch-Hatton
- Heir: Tobias Finch-Hatton, Viscount Maidstone
- Parents: Christopher Finch-Hatton, 16th Earl of Winchilsea; Shirley Hatfield

Daniel James Hatfield Finch-Hatton, 17th Earl of Winchilsea, 12th Earl of Nottingham (born 7 October 1967), is a British hereditary peer and descendant of the American Vanderbilt family and the Hungarian Széchenyi family.

He was a member of the House of Lords between June and November 1999.

== Early life ==
He was born to Christopher Finch-Hatton, 16th Earl of Winchilsea, 11th Earl of Nottingham (1936–1999) and his wife, Shirley Hatfield (d. 22 October 2017). His paternal grandparents were Christopher Finch-Hatton, 15th Earl of Winchilsea (1911–1950) and Countess Gladys Széchényi Sárvár-Felsövidék. Finch-Hatton's paternal great-grandparents were Guy Finch-Hatton, 14th Earl of Winchilsea (1885–1939) and Margaretta Armstrong Drexel (1885–1952), the daughter of banker Anthony Joseph Drexel Jr. of Philadelphia. Finch-Hatton's other great-grandparents were Count László Széchényi Sárvár-Felsövidék (1879–1938) and Gladys Moore Vanderbilt (1886–1965).

Together, his parents had: Daniel Finch-Hatton, 17th Earl of Winchilsea and Lady Alice Nan Christine Finch-Hatton (born 1970)

== Peerage ==
When his father died on 26 June 1999, he inherited his titles, including the seat in the House of Lords. However, he lost this seat on 11 November 1999, when the House of Lords Act was implemented. There are no speeches listed for him in Hansard.

== Activities ==
Daniel Finch-Hatton appears in adverts for Hattons of London, a private collectable coin merchant, where he holds the title of Honorary Chairman.

== Personal life ==
He married Shelley Amanda Gillard in 1994, with whom he has children:

- Tobias Joshua Stormont Finch-Hatton, Viscount Maidstone (born 21 June 1998)
- Hon. Sebastian Alexander Heneage Finch-Hatton (born 6 June 2002)
- Lady India Olivia Scarlett Finch-Hatton (born 5 November 2004)

The current earl resided at South Cadbury House, Yeovil, Somerset.

Peerage of England
| Preceded by Christopher Finch-Hatton | Earl of Winchilsea; 1999–present | Incumbent; Heir apparent: Tobias Finch-Hatton, Viscount Maidstone |
| Preceded by Christopher Finch-Hatton | Earl of Nottingham; 1999–present | Incumbent; Heir apparent: Tobias Finch-Hatton, Viscount Maidstone |
