= Kakeout Mountain =

Mountain in New Jersey, United States

Coordinates: 40.98851°N 74.37744°W

Kakeout Mountain (formerly Kikeout Mountain) is a summit in Kinnelon borough, Morris County, New Jersey, in the United States.

The name Kikeout was derived from the Dutch word kijkuit, meaning "lookout". "Kakeout" is the local pronunciation of the name of the mountain and adjacent reservoir, but the spelling caused a degree of local controversy as it includes the word kike, an ethnic slur referring to Jews. Because of this, the spelling was changed from Kikeout to Kakeout.

Kakeout Mountain is the highest point in Kinnelon, offering a view of the Hudson River. For this reason, and its location between Ringwood Manor and Morristown, Kakeout Mountain was used by George Washington's troops during the American Revolutionary War.

A vein of gold was reported to have been found in the "Kikeout Mountains [sic]" in 1897.

In 1936, work was started on a 325 feet wide by 25 feet tall dam, creating a 553 acre lake on Kakeout Mountain. The construction was projected to cost $245,000, employ 334 laborers and supply 3.5 million gallons of water per day. The bulk of the funding was to be provided by the WPA.

In 1940, a wading pool was created using Kikeout Brook, the overflow from the reservoir on Kakeout Mountain.

During World War II, guards were posted to defend the reservoir atop Kakeout Mountain.

In 1957, there were two forest fires.

In 1967, a water project was completed that stored one and a half million gallons at a cost of $750,000.
