= Vanderbilt family =

Prominent American family

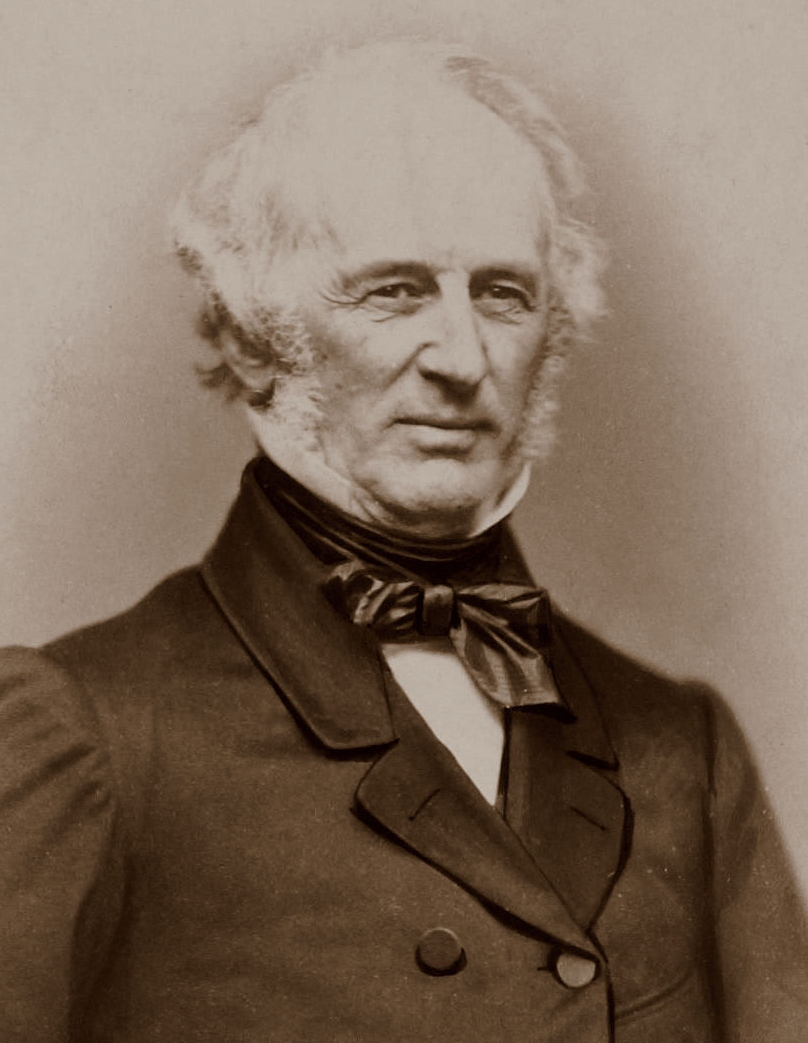
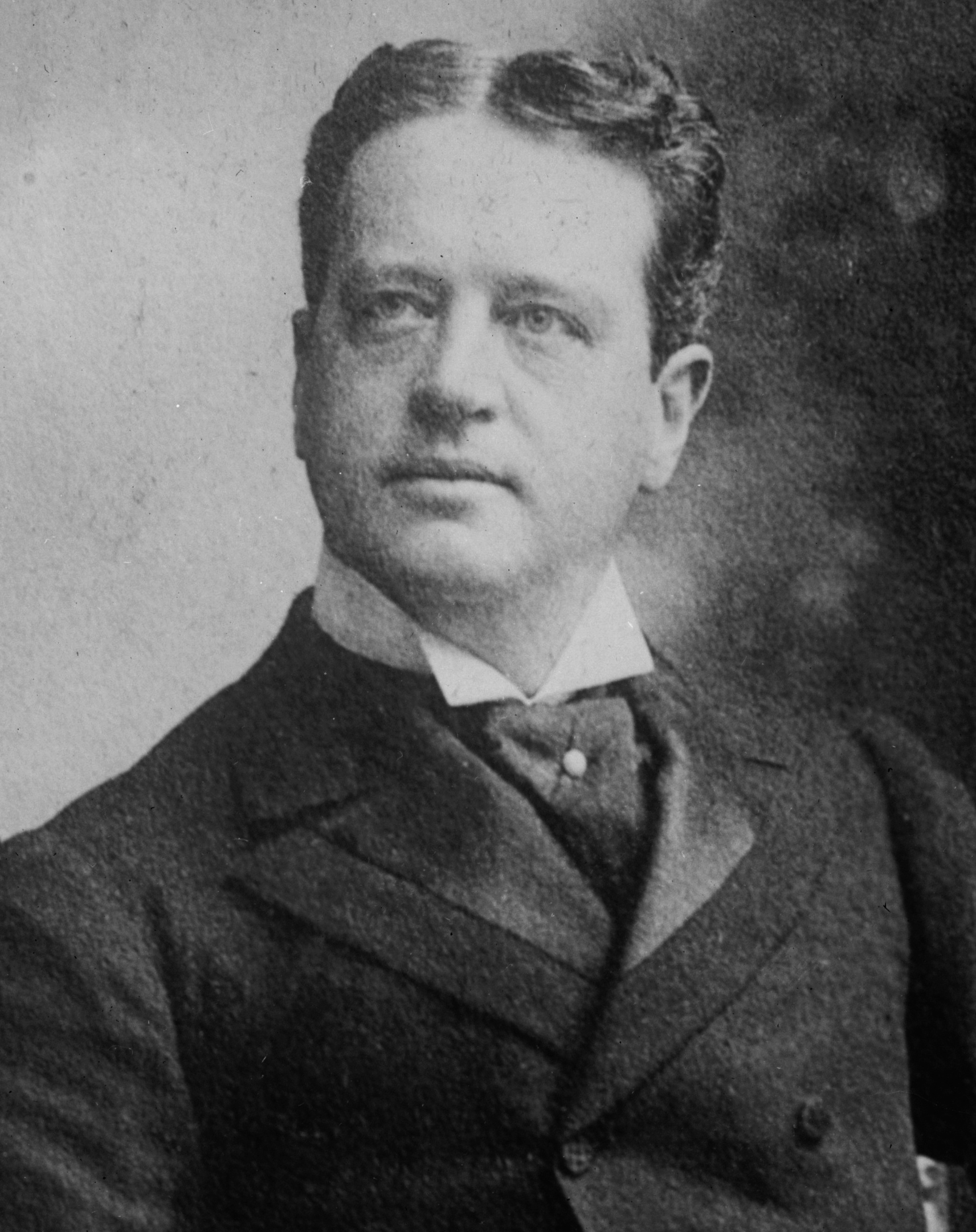
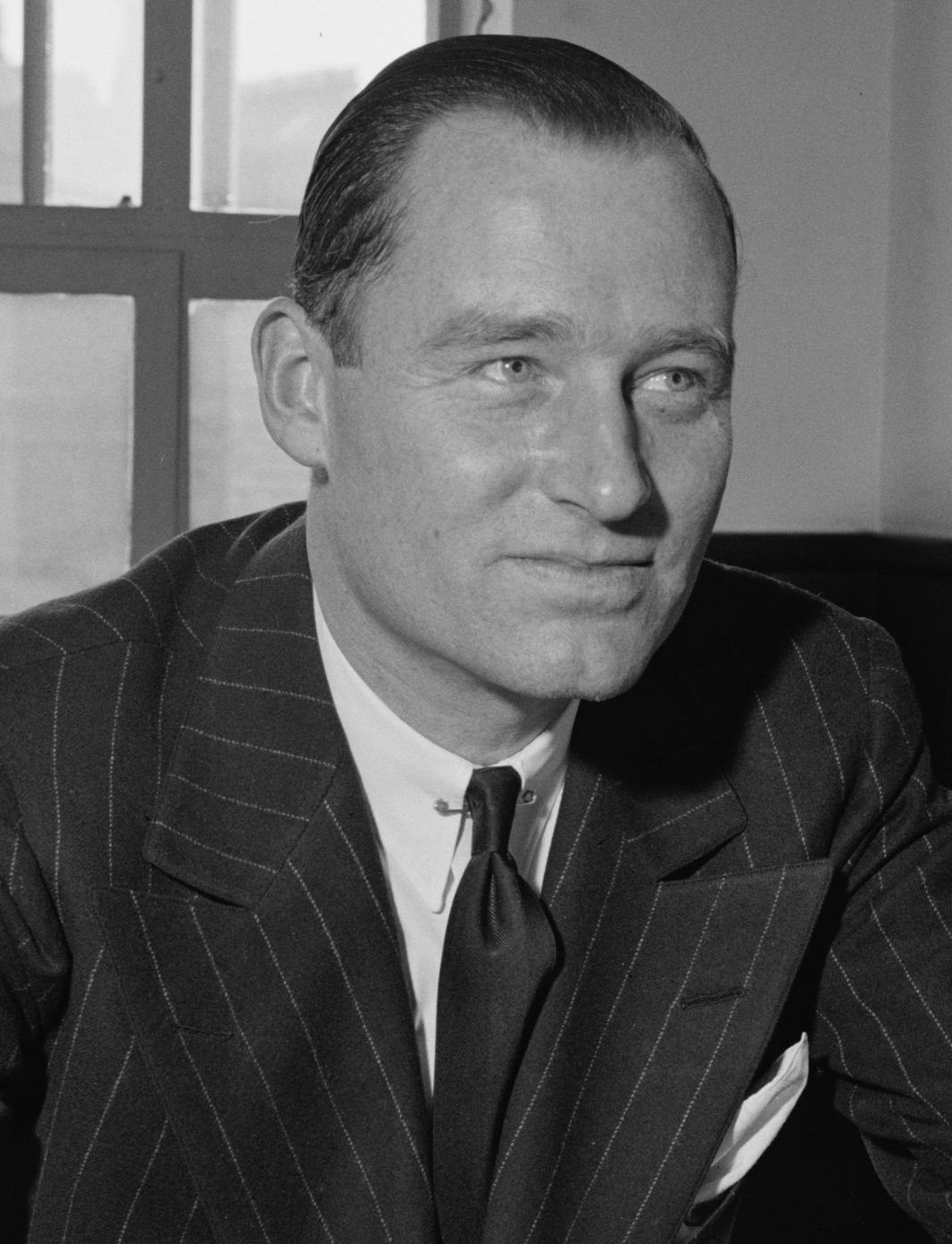
- Cornelius Vanderbilt William Kissam Vanderbilt William Henry Vanderbilt III
- Current region: United States East Coast
- Earlier spellings: Van der Bilt, van Derbilt
- Etymology: Van der Bilt ("from de Bilt")
- Origin: De Bilt, Netherlands
- Connected families: Cecil family Whitney family House of Széchenyi; Spencer family Havemeyer family Finch-Hatton Family
- Estate: Vanderbilt houses

The Vanderbilt family is an American family who gained prominence during the Gilded Age. Their success began with the shipping and railroad empires of Cornelius Vanderbilt, and the family expanded into various other areas of industry and philanthropy. Cornelius Vanderbilt's descendants went on to build grand mansions on Fifth Avenue in New York City; luxurious "summer cottages" in Newport, Rhode Island; the palatial Biltmore House in Asheville, North Carolina; and various other opulent homes. The family also built Berkshire cottages in the western region of Massachusetts; examples include Elm Court.

The Vanderbilts were once the wealthiest family in the United States. Cornelius Vanderbilt was the richest American until his death in 1877. After that, his son William Henry Vanderbilt acquired his father's fortune, and was the richest American until his death in 1885. The Vanderbilts' prominence lasted until the mid-20th century. Thereafter, the family's 10 great Fifth Avenue mansions were torn down, and most other Vanderbilt houses were sold or turned into museums in what has been referred to as the "Fall of the House of Vanderbilt".

Branches of the family are found on the United States East Coast. Contemporary descendants include American art historian John Wilmerding, journalist Anderson Cooper (son of Gloria Vanderbilt), actor Timothy Olyphant, musician John P. Hammond, screenwriter James Vanderbilt, and the Duke of Marlborough James Spencer-Churchill.

== History ==
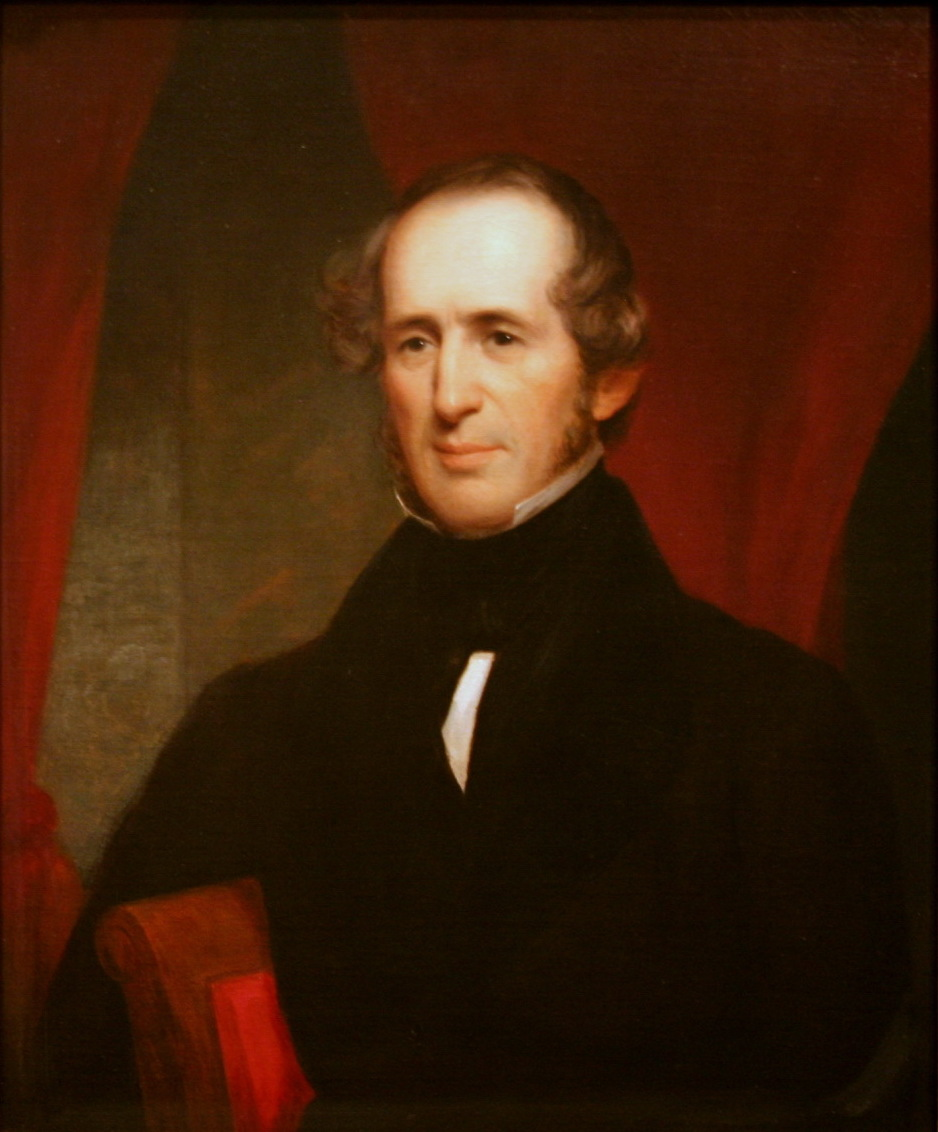
Cornelius Vanderbilt, the founder of the Vanderbilt business dynasty.

The progenitor of the Vanderbilt family was Jan Aertszoon or Aertson (1620–1705), a Dutch farmer from the village of De Bilt in Utrecht, Netherlands, who emigrated to the Dutch colony of New Netherland as an indentured servant to the Van Kouwenhoven family in 1650. The name of Jan's village, in the dative case, was added to the Dutch "van" ("from") to create "Van der Bilt", which evolved into "Vanderbilt" when the English took control of New Amsterdam (now Manhattan). The family is associated with the Dutch patrician Van der Bilt. His great-great-great-grandson, Cornelius Vanderbilt, began the rise of the Vanderbilt dynasty. He was the fourth of nine children born into a Staten Island family of modest means. Through his paternal great-great grandmother, Abigail Southard, he descended from Republic of Salé President Jan Janszoon and his son Anthony Janszoon van Salee. They were among the earliest arrivals to 17th-century New Amsterdam. In a number of documents dating back to that period, Anthony is described as tawny, as his mother was of Berber origin from Cartagena in the Kingdom of Murcia. Cornelius Vanderbilt left school at age 11 and went on to build a shipping and railroad empire that, during the 19th century, would make him one of the wealthiest men in the world.

Starting with a single commercial boat for crossing from Staten Island to Manhattan, he grew his fleet until he was competing with Robert Fulton for dominance of the New York waterways, his energy and eagerness earning him the nickname "Commodore", a United States Navy title for a captain of a small task force. Fulton's company had established a monopoly on trade in and out of New York Harbor. Vanderbilt, based in New Jersey at the time, flouted the law, steaming in and out of the harbor under a flag that read, "New Jersey Must Be Free!" He also hired the attorney Daniel Webster to argue his case before the United States Supreme Court; Vanderbilt won, thereby establishing an early precedent for the United States' first laws of interstate commerce.

While many Vanderbilt family members had joined the Episcopal Church, Cornelius Vanderbilt remained a member of the Moravian Church to his death. The Vanderbilt family lived on Staten Island until the mid-1800s, when the Commodore built a house on Washington Place (in what is now Greenwich Village). Although he always occupied a relatively modest home, members of his family would use their wealth to build magnificent mansions. Shortly before his death in 1877, Vanderbilt donated US$1 million (equivalent to $30 million in 2025) for the establishment of Vanderbilt University in Nashville.

The Commodore left the majority of his enormous fortune to his eldest son, William Henry Vanderbilt. William Henry, who outlived his father by just eight years, increased the profitability of his father's holdings, increased the reach of the New York Central Railroad, and doubled the Vanderbilt wealth. He was the only heir to increase the Vanderbilt fortune. He built the first of what would become many grand Vanderbilt mansions on Fifth Avenue, at 640 Fifth Avenue. William Henry appointed his first son, Cornelius Vanderbilt II, as the next "Head of House".

Cornelius II built the largest private home in New York, at 1 West 57th Street, containing approximately 154 rooms, designed by George B. Post. He also built The Breakers in Newport, Rhode Island.

Cornelius II's brother, William Kissam Vanderbilt, also featured prominently in the family's affairs. He also built a home on Fifth Avenue and would become one of the great architectural patrons of the Gilded Age, hiring the architects for (the third, and surviving) Grand Central Terminal. He also built Marble House at 596 Bellevue Avenue in Newport, Rhode Island.

George Washington Vanderbilt II, the 4th and youngest son of William Henry Vanderbilt and youngest brother of Cornelius II, hired architect Richard Morris Hunt and landscape architect Frederick Law Olmsted to construct Biltmore Estate on 125,000 acres (51,000 ha) near Asheville, North Carolina. The 250 room mansion, with 175,856 sq ft (16,337.6 m^{2}) of floor space, is the largest house in the United States.

While some of Cornelius Vanderbilt's descendants gained fame in business, others achieved prominence in other ways:

- Alfred Gwynne Vanderbilt (1877–1915), was a passenger on the RMS Lusitania and died when it sank.
- Alfred's eldest son, from his first marriage, William Henry Vanderbilt III was Governor of Rhode Island.
- Alfred's second son Alfred Jr. became a noted horse breeder and racing elder.
- William Kissam Vanderbilt's son Harold Stirling Vanderbilt (1884–1970) gained fame as a sportsman. He invented the contract form of bridge and won the most coveted prize in yacht racing, the America's Cup, on three occasions.
- Harold's brother William Kissam "Willie K" Vanderbilt II launched the Vanderbilt Cup for auto racing.
- Cornelius Vanderbilt II's granddaughter Gloria Vanderbilt (1924–2019) was a noted artist, designer, actress, author, and business woman.
- Gloria's son, Anderson Cooper, is a Peabody Award and Emmy Award-winning journalist, author, and television producer and personality.
- Cornelius Vanderbilt II's daughter Gertrude Vanderbilt Whitney was a sculptor, art patron and collector, and founder of the Whitney Museum of American Art.

In 1855, Commodore Cornelius Vanderbilt donated 45 acres (18 ha) of property to the Moravian Church and Cemetery at New Dorp on Staten Island, New York. Later, his son William Henry Vanderbilt donated a further 4 acres (1.6 ha). The Vanderbilt Family Mausoleum was designed in 1885 by architect Richard Morris Hunt and landscaped by Frederick Law Olmsted.

== Vanderbilt family tree ==
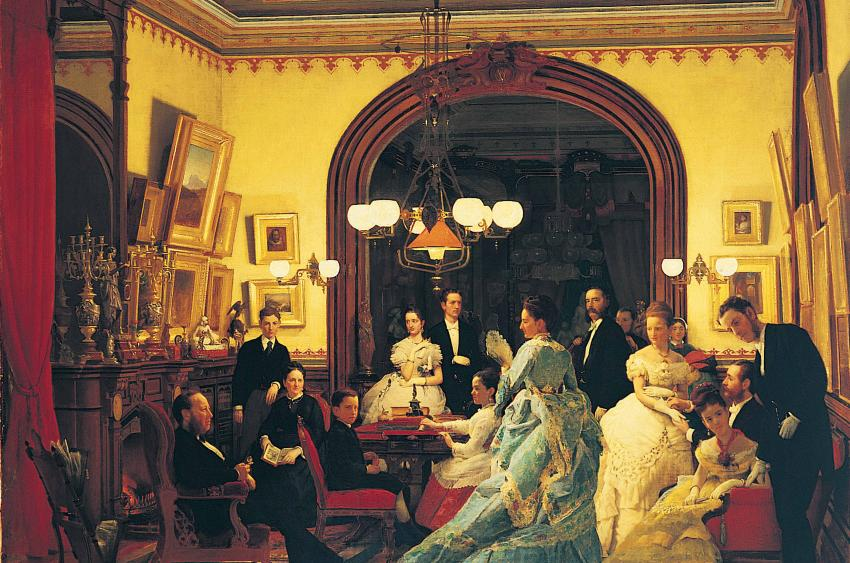
Going to the Opera, an 1874 portrait of W.H. Vanderbilt's family in their 459 5th Avenue mansion by Seymour Joseph Guy

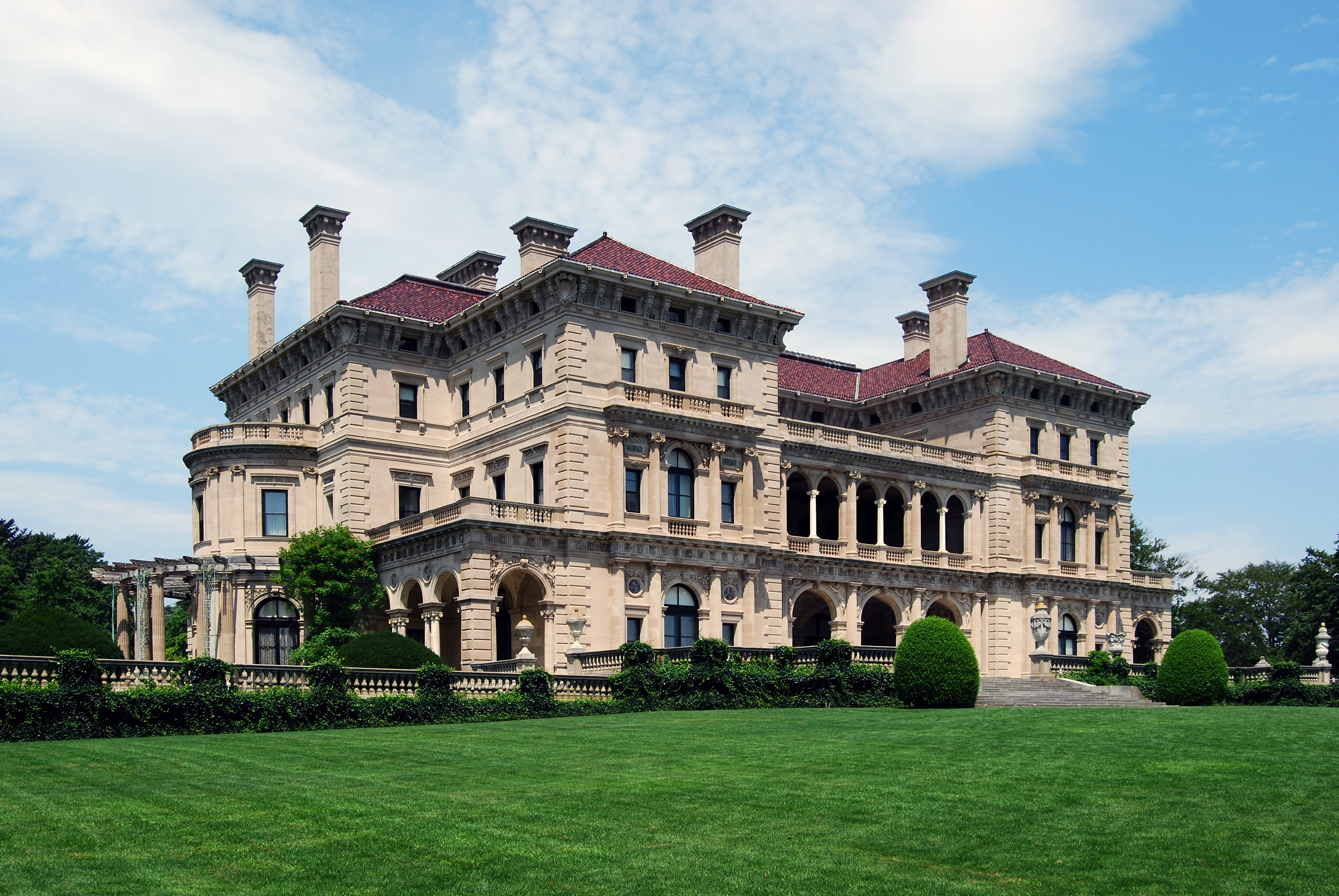
The Breakers, built in 1892–1895 for Cornelius Vanderbilt II, Newport, Rhode Island

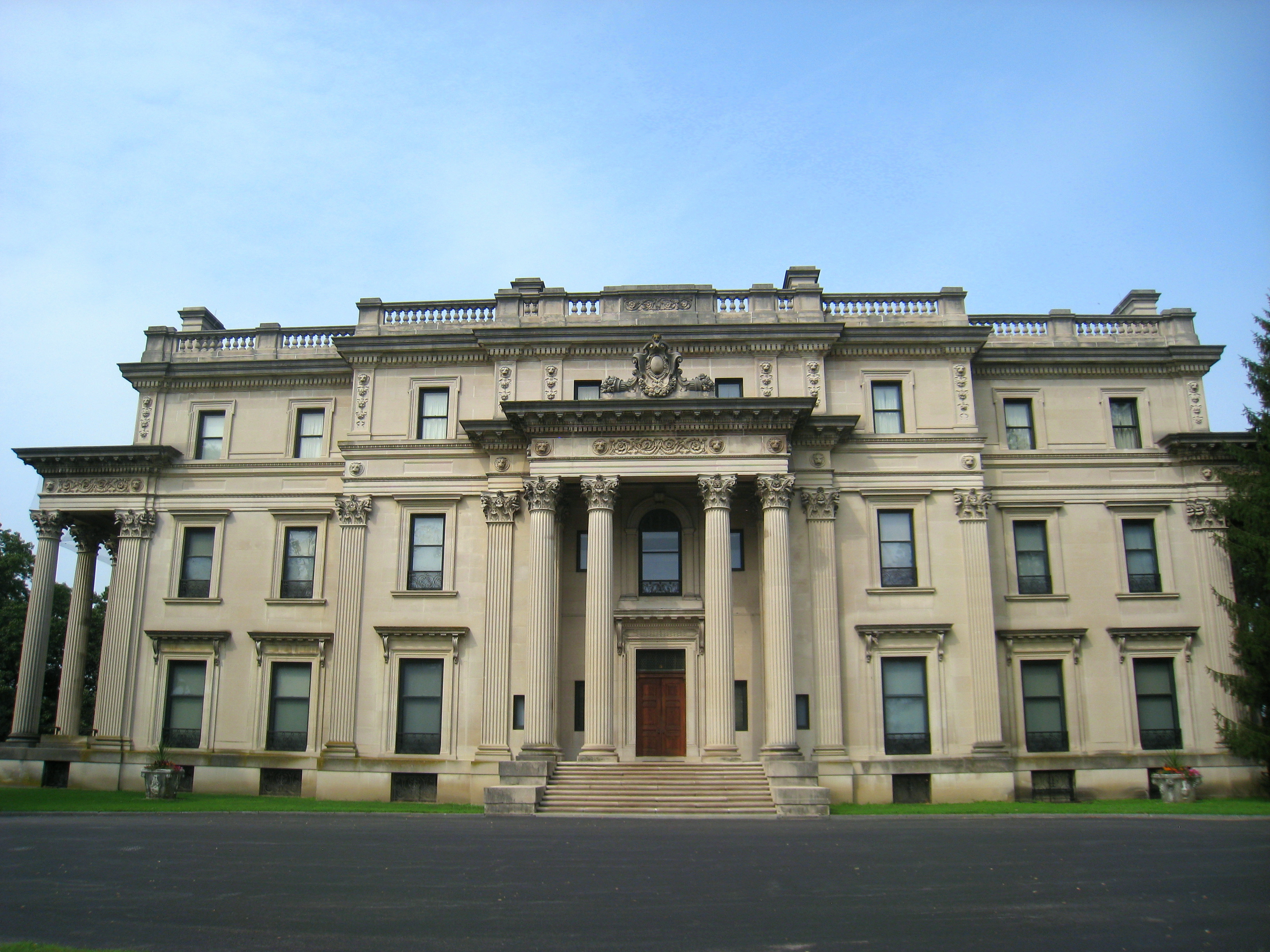
Frederick William Vanderbilt's home, now known as the Vanderbilt Mansion National Historic Site, Hyde Park, New York.

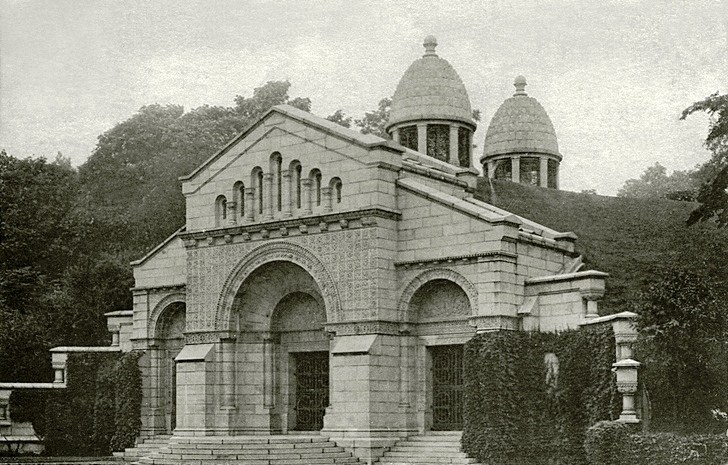
The Vanderbilt mausoleum at the Moravian Cemetery in New Dorp, Staten Island, New York

- Cornelius Vanderbilt (1794–1877)
  - William Henry Vanderbilt (1821–1885)
    - Cornelius Vanderbilt II (1843–1899)
      - Alice Gwynne Vanderbilt (1869–1874)
      - William Henry Vanderbilt II (1870–1892)
      - Cornelius Vanderbilt III (1873–1942)
        - Cornelius Vanderbilt IV (1898–1974)
      - Gertrude Vanderbilt (1875–1942)
        - Flora Payne Whitney (1897–1986)
          - Pamela Tower (1921–2013)
            - John LeBoutillier (born 1953)
          - Whitney Tower (1923–1999)
          - Flora Miller Biddle (born 1928)
        - Barbara Whitney (1903–1983)
        - Cornelius Vanderbilt Whitney (1899–1992)
      - Alfred Gwynne Vanderbilt (1877–1915)
        - Governor William Henry Vanderbilt III (1901–1981)
        - Alfred Gwynne Vanderbilt Jr. (1912–1999)
          - Heidi Vanderbilt (1948–2021)
          - Alfred Gwynne Vanderbilt III (born 1949)
            - James Platten Vanderbilt (born 1975)
        - George Washington Vanderbilt III (1914–1961)
      - Reginald Claypoole Vanderbilt (1880–1925)
        - Cathleen Vanderbilt (1904–1944)
        - Gloria Laura Vanderbilt (1924–2019)
          - Leopold Stanislaus "Stan" Stokowski (born 1950)
          - Christopher Stokowski (born 1952)
          - Carter Vanderbilt Cooper (1965–1988)
          - Anderson Hays Cooper (born 1967)
            - Wyatt Morgan Maisani-Cooper (born 2020)
            - Sebastian Luke Maisani-Cooper (born 2022)
      - Gladys Moore Vanderbilt (1886–1965)
        - Countess Cornelia "Gilia" Széchényi (1908–1958)
        - Countess Alice "Ai" Széchényi (1911–1974)
        - Countess Gladys Széchényi (1913–1978)
          - Christopher Denys Stormont Finch-Hatton, 16th Earl of Winchilsea (1936–1999)
            - Daniel Finch-Hatton, 17th Earl of Winchilsea (born 1967)
              - Tobias Finch-Hatton, Viscount Maidstone (born 1998)
        - Countess Sylvia Anita Gabriel Denise Irene Marie "Sylvie" Széchényi (1918–1998)
        - Countess Ferdinandine "Bubby" Széchényi (1923–2016)
          - Count Peter von und zu Eltz (born 1948)
            - Countess Alexandra von und zu Eltz (born 1986)
            - Count Albrecht von und zu Eltz (born 1988)
            - Countess Marie von und zu Eltz (born 1991)
          - Count Nicholas von und zu Eltz (1950–2012)
    - Margaret Louisa Vanderbilt (1845–1924)
      - Florence Shepard (1869–1869)
      - Maria Louise Shepard (1870–1948)
      - Edith Shepard (1872–1954)
      - Margaret Shepard (1873–1895)
      - Alice Louise Vanderbilt Shepard (1874–1950)
        - Dave Hennen Morris Jr. (1900–1975)
        - Louise Morris (1901–1976)
        - Lawrence Morris (1903–1967)
        - Noel Morris (1904–1928)
        - Emily Hammond Morris (1907–1995)
        - Alice Vanderbilt Morris (1911–1986)
      - Elliott Fitch Shepard Jr. (1876–1927)
    - William Kissam Vanderbilt (1849–1920)
      - Consuelo Vanderbilt (1877–1964)
        - John Spencer-Churchill, 10th Duke of Marlborough (1897–1972)
          - John Spencer-Churchill, 11th Duke of Marlborough (1926–2014)
            - Charles James Spencer-Churchill, 12th Duke of Marlborough (born 1955)
              - George John Godolphin Spencer-Churchill, Marquess of Blandford (born 1992)
            - Lady Henrietta Mary Spencer-Churchill (born 1958)
          - Lady Rosemary Spencer-Churchill (born 1929)
        - Lord Ivor Spencer-Churchill (1898–1956)
      - William Kissam Vanderbilt II (1878–1944)
        - Muriel Vanderbilt (1900–1972)
      - Harold Stirling Vanderbilt (1884–1970)
    - Emily Thorn Vanderbilt (1850–1946)
      - Florence Adele Sloane (1873–1960)
        - James A. Burden III (1897–1979)
        - William Douglas Burden (1898–1978)
          - Katharine Sage Burden (born 1927)
            - Katharine Sage Sohier (born 1954)
          - Andrew White Burden (born 1935)
            - William Douglas Burden III (born 1965)
      - Emily Vanderbilt Sloane (1874–1970)
        - Adele Sloane Hammond (1902–1998)
          - John Vernon Bevan Olyphant (born 1941)
            - Timothy David Olyphant (born 1968)
        - John Henry Hammond Jr. (1910–1987)
          - John Paul Hammond (1942-2026)
      - Lila Vanderbilt Sloane (1878–1934)
        - Frederick Vanderbilt Field (1905–2000)
    - Florence Adele Vanderbilt (1854–1952)
      - Alice Twombly (1879–1896)
      - Florence Vanderbilt Twombly (1881–1969)
        - Alice Twombly Burden (1905–1905)
        - William Armistead Moale Burden (1906–1984)
        - Shirley Carter Burden (1908–1989)
          - Shirley Carter Burden Jr. (1941–1996)
      - Ruth Twombly (1884–1954)
      - Hamilton McKown Twombly Jr. (1887–1906)
    - Frederick William Vanderbilt (1856–1938)
    - Eliza "Lila" Osgood Vanderbilt (1860–1936)
      - James Watson Webb II (1884–1960)
        - Lila Vanderbilt Webb (1913–1961)
          - John Currie Wilmerding Jr. (1938-2024)
        - James Watson Webb III (1916–2000)
      - William Seward Webb Jr. (1887–1956)
      - Vanderbilt Seward Webb (1891–1956)
    - George Washington Vanderbilt II (1862–1914)
      - Cornelia Stuyvesant Vanderbilt (1900–1976)
        - George Henry Vanderbilt Cecil (1925–2020)
        - William Amherst Vanderbilt Cecil (1928–2017)
          - William Amherst Vanderbilt Cecil Jr. (b. 1958)
            - Aubrey Vanderbilt Cecil (b. 1990)
  - Emily Almira Vanderbilt (1823–1896)
    - William Knapp Thorn (1851–1911)
    - Caroline Roberts Thorn (1858–1949)
      - Jeannette Thorn Kissel (1889–1957)
        - Aline Thorn Pease (1919-2010)
          - Kenneth Peter Lyle Mackay, 4th Earl of Inchcape (born 1943)
        - Richard Thorn Pease, 3rd Baronet (1922–2021)
          - Richard Peter Pease, 4th Baronet (born 1958)
          - Nichola Pease (born 1961)
        - Derrick Alix Pease (1927–1998)
          - Jonathan Edward Pease (born 1952)
  - Cornelius Jeremiah Vanderbilt (1830–1882)

== Cornelius Vanderbilt and his descendants (by year of birth) ==
1. Cornelius Vanderbilt (1794–1877), 1st generation
2. William Henry Vanderbilt (1821–1885), 2nd generation, son of Cornelius Vanderbilt
3. Cornelius Jeremiah Vanderbilt (1830–1882), 2nd generation, son of Cornelius Vanderbilt
4. Cornelius Vanderbilt II (1843–1899), 3rd generation, grandson of Cornelius Vanderbilt
5. Margaret Louisa Vanderbilt (1845–1924), 3rd generation, granddaughter of Cornelius Vanderbilt
6. William Kissam Vanderbilt (1849–1920), 3rd generation, grandson of Cornelius Vanderbilt
7. Emily Thorn Vanderbilt (1850–1946), 3rd generation, granddaughter of Cornelius Vanderbilt
8. William Knapp Thorn (1851–1911), 3rd generation, grandson of Cornelius Vanderbilt
9. Florence Adele Vanderbilt (1854–1952), 3rd generation, granddaughter of Cornelius Vanderbilt
10. Frederick William Vanderbilt (1856–1938), 3rd generation, grandson of Cornelius Vanderbilt
11. Eliza "Lila" Osgood Vanderbilt (1860–1936), 3rd generation, granddaughter of Cornelius Vanderbilt
12. George Washington Vanderbilt II (1862–1914), 3rd generation, grandson of Cornelius Vanderbilt
13. Cornelius Vanderbilt III (1873–1942), 4th generation, great-grandson of Cornelius Vanderbilt
14. Emily Vanderbilt Sloane (1874–1970), 4th generation, great-granddaughter of Cornelius Vanderbilt
15. Alice Louise Vanderbilt Shepard (1874–1950), 4th generation, great-granddaughter of Cornelius Vanderbilt
16. Gertrude Vanderbilt (1875–1942), 4th generation, great-granddaughter of Cornelius Vanderbilt
17. Elliott Fitch Shepard Jr. (1876–1927), 4th generation, great-grandson of Cornelius Vanderbilt
18. Alfred Gwynne Vanderbilt (1877–1915), 4th generation, great-grandson of Cornelius Vanderbilt
19. Consuelo Vanderbilt (1877–1964), 4th generation, great-granddaughter of Cornelius Vanderbilt
20. William Kissam Vanderbilt II (1878–1944), 4th generation, great-grandson of Cornelius Vanderbilt
21. Reginald Claypoole Vanderbilt (1880–1925), 4th generation, great-grandson of Cornelius Vanderbilt
22. James Watson Webb II (1884–1960), 4th generation, great-grandson of Cornelius Vanderbilt
23. Harold Stirling Vanderbilt (1884–1970), 4th generation, great-grandson of Cornelius Vanderbilt
24. Gladys Moore Vanderbilt (1886–1965), 4th generation, great-granddaughter of Cornelius Vanderbilt
25. Flora Payne Whitney (1897–1986), 5th generation, great-great-granddaughter of Cornelius Vanderbilt
26. John Spencer-Churchill, 10th Duke of Marlborough (1897–1972), 5th generation, great-great-grandson of Cornelius Vanderbilt
27. Cornelius Vanderbilt IV (1898–1974), 5th generation, great-great-grandson of Cornelius Vanderbilt
28. William Douglas Burden (1898–1978), 5th generation, great-great-grandson of Cornelius Vanderbilt
29. Lord Ivor Spencer-Churchill (1898–1956), 5th generation, great-great-grandson of Cornelius Vanderbilt
30. Cornelius Vanderbilt Whitney (1899–1992), 5th generation, great-great-grandson of Cornelius Vanderbilt
31. Muriel Vanderbilt (1900–1972), 5th generation, great-great-granddaughter of Cornelius Vanderbilt
32. Cornelia Stuyvesant Vanderbilt (1900–1976), 4th generation, great-granddaughter of Cornelius Vanderbilt
33. Governor William Henry Vanderbilt III (1901–1981)
34. Mary Cathleen Vanderbilt (1904–1944)
35. Frederick Vanderbilt Field (1905–2000)
36. William Armistead Moale Burden II (1906–1984)
37. Shirley Carter Burden (1908–1989), 5th generation, great-great-grandson of Cornelius Vanderbilt
38. John Henry Hammond Jr. (1910–1987), 5th generation, great-great-grandson of Cornelius Vanderbilt
39. Alfred Gwynne Vanderbilt Jr. (1912–1999), 5th generation, great-great-grandson of Cornelius Vanderbilt
40. George Washington Vanderbilt III (1914–1961), 5th generation, great-great-grandson of Cornelius Vanderbilt
41. James Watson Webb III (1916–2000)
42. Lady Sarah Spencer-Churchill (1921–2000)
43. Sir Richard Thorn Pease, 3rd Baronet (1922–2021)
44. Whitney Tower (1923–1999)
45. Gloria Laura Vanderbilt (1924–2019)
46. George Henry Vanderbilt Cecil (1925–2020)
47. John Spencer-Churchill, 11th Duke of Marlborough (1926–2014), 6th generation (3 × great-grandson of Cornelius Vanderbilt)
48. William Amherst Vanderbilt Cecil (1928–2017)
49. Flora Miller Biddle (born 1928)
50. Lady Rosemary Spencer-Churchill (born 1929)
51. Christopher Denys Stormont Finch-Hatton, 16th Earl of Winchilsea (1936–1999), 6th generation (3 × great-grandson of Cornelius Vanderbilt)
52. John Wilmerding (born 1938), 6th generation (3 × great-grandson of Cornelius Vanderbilt)
53. Shirley Carter Burden Jr. (1941–1996), 6th generation (3 × great-grandson of Cornelius Vanderbilt)
54. John Paul Hammond (1942-2026), 6th generation (3 × great-grandson of Cornelius Vanderbilt)
55. Kenneth Peter Lyle Mackay, 4th Earl of Inchcape (born 1943), 6th generation (3 × great-grandson of Cornelius Vanderbilt)
56. Heidi Vanderbilt (1948–2021), 6th generation
57. Alfred Gwynne Vanderbilt III, 6th generation
58. Jonathan Edward Pease (born 1952), 6th generation (3 × great-grandson of Cornelius Vanderbilt)
59. John LeBoutillier (born 1953), 7th generation (4 × great-grandson of Cornelius Vanderbilt)
60. Sage Sohier (born 1954), 7th generation (4 × great-granddaughter of Cornelius Vanderbilt)
61. Charles James Spencer-Churchill, 12th Duke of Marlborough (born 1955), 7th generation (4 × great-grandson of Cornelius Vanderbilt)
62. Sir Richard Peter Pease, 4th Baronet (born 1958), 6th generation (3 × great-grandson of Cornelius Vanderbilt)
63. Lady Henrietta Mary Spencer-Churchill (born 1958), 7th generation (4 × great-granddaughter of Cornelius Vanderbilt)
64. Nichola Pease (born 1961), 6th generation (3 × great-granddaughter of Cornelius Vanderbilt)
65. William Douglas Burden III (born 1965), 7th generation (4 × great-grandson of Cornelius Vanderbilt)
66. Anderson Hays Cooper (born 1967), 6th generation (3 × great-grandson of Cornelius Vanderbilt)
67. Daniel Finch-Hatton, 17th Earl of Winchilsea (born 1967), 7th generation (4 × great-grandson of Cornelius Vanderbilt)
68. Timothy David Olyphant (born 1968), 7th generation (4 × great-grandson of Cornelius Vanderbilt)
69. James Platten Vanderbilt (born 1975), 7th generation (4 × great-grandson of Cornelius Vanderbilt)
70. George John Godolphin Spencer-Churchill, Marquess of Blandford (born 1992), 8th generation (5 × great-grandson of Cornelius Vanderbilt)

== Other Vanderbilt descendants, but not of Cornelius Vanderbilt ==
1. Amy Vanderbilt (1908–1974) — believed to be descended from either a brother or a cousin of Cornelius Vanderbilt

== Spouses of descendants of Cornelius Vanderbilt (by year of birth) ==
1. Horace F. Clark (1815–1873): 1st husband of Maria Louisa Vanderbilt
2. Nicholas B. La Bau (1823–1873): 1st husband of Mary Alicia Vanderbilt
3. Elliott Fitch Shepard (1833–1893): husband of Margaret Louisa Vanderbilt Shepard
4. Frank Armstrong Crawford Vanderbilt (1839–1885): 2nd wife of Cornelius Vanderbilt
5. William Douglas Sloane (1844–1915): 1st husband of Emily Thorn Vanderbilt
6. Alice Claypoole Vanderbilt (1845–1934): wife of Cornelius Vanderbilt II
7. Hamilton McKown Twombly (1849–1910): husband of Florence Adele Vanderbilt Twombly
8. Henry White (1850–1927): 2nd husband of Emily Thorn Vanderbilt
9. William Seward Webb (1851–1926): husband of Eliza Osgood Vanderbilt Webb
10. Alva Belmont (1853–1933): 1st wife of William Kissam Vanderbilt
11. Louise Vanderbilt (1854–1926): wife of Frederick William Vanderbilt
12. Anne Harriman Vanderbilt (1861–1940): 2nd wife of William Kissam Vanderbilt
13. Richard M. Tobin (1866–1952): 2nd husband of Florence Adele Sloane
14. William Jay Schieffelin (1866–1955): husband of Maria Louise Shepard, eldest daughter of Margaret Louisa Vanderbilt Shepard
15. Jacques Balsan (1868–1956): 2nd husband of Consuelo Vanderbilt
16. Grace Vanderbilt (1870–1953): wife of Cornelius Vanderbilt III
17. James A. Burden Jr. (1871–1932): 1st husband of Florence Adele Sloane
18. Charles Spencer-Churchill, 9th Duke of Marlborough (1871–1934): 1st husband of Consuelo Vanderbilt
19. Dave Hennen Morris (1872–1944): husband of Alice Vanderbilt Morris
20. Harry Payne Whitney (1872–1930): husband of Gertrude Vanderbilt Whitney
21. Edith Stuyvesant Gerry (1873–1958): wife of George Washington Vanderbilt II
22. Virginia Fair Vanderbilt (1875–1935): 1st wife of William Kissam Vanderbilt II
23. George G. McMurtry (1876–1958): 4th husband of Teresa Sarah Margaret Fabbri
24. László Széchenyi (1879–1938): husband of Gladys Vanderbilt Széchenyi
25. Ralph Pulitzer (1879–1939): 1st husband of Frederica Vanderbilt Webb
26. Leopold Stokowski (1882–1977): 2nd husband of Gloria Vanderbilt
27. Electra Havemeyer Webb (1888–1960): wife of James Watson Webb II
28. Frederick Osborn (1889–1981): husband of Margaret Louisa Schieffelin
29. John Francis Amherst Cecil (1890–1954): 1st husband of Cornelia Stuyvesant Vanderbilt
30. Vivian Francis Bulkeley-Johnson (1891–1968): 2nd husband of Cornelia Stuyvesant Vanderbilt
31. Aileen Osborn Webb (1892–1979): wife of Vanderbilt Webb
32. Frederic Cameron Church Jr. (1897–1983): 1st husband of Muriel Vanderbilt
33. John J. Emery (1898–1976): 2nd husband of Adele Sloane Hammond
34. Mary Spencer-Churchill, Duchess of Marlborough (1900–1921); 1st wife of John Spencer-Churchill, 10th Duke of Marlborough
35. Jack Speiden (1900–1970): 2nd husband of Rachel Hammond
36. Arthur Duckworth (1901–1986): 1st husband of Alice Frances Hammond
37. Gertrude Conaway Vanderbilt (1901–1978): wife of Harold Stirling Vanderbilt
38. Marie Norton Harriman (1903–1970): 1st wife of Cornelius Vanderbilt Whitney
39. Charles Bosanquet (1903–1986): husband of Barbara Schieffelin
40. Earl E. T. Smith (1903–1991): 1st husband of Consuelo Vanderbilt Earl
41. Gloria Morgan Vanderbilt (1904–1965): 2nd wife of Reginald Claypoole Vanderbilt
42. Dunbar Bostwick (1908–2006): husband of Electra Webb
43. George W. Headley (1908–1985): 3rd husband of Barbara Vanderbilt Whitney
44. Eleanor Searle (1908–2002): 3rd wife of Cornelius Vanderbilt Whitney
45. Pat DiCicco (1909–1978): 1st husband of Gloria Vanderbilt
46. Benny Goodman (1909–1986): 2nd husband of Alice Frances Hammond
47. Edward P. Morgan (1910–1993): 2nd husband of Katharine Sage Burden
48. Christopher Finch-Hatton, 15th Earl of Winchilsea (1911–1950): 1st husband of Countess Gladys Széchényi
49. Edwin F. Russell (1914–2001): 1st husband of Lady Sarah Consuelo Spencer-Churchill
50. Laura Spencer-Churchill, Duchess of Marlborough (1915–1990): 2nd wife of John Spencer-Churchill, 10th Duke of Marlborough
51. Louis Auchincloss (1917–2010): husband of Adele Burden Lawrence
52. Kenneth James William Mackay, 3rd Earl of Inchcape (1917–1994): 2nd husband of Aline Thorn Pease
53. Jeanne Lourdes Murray (1919–2013): wife of Alfred Gwynne Vanderbilt Jr.
54. Orin Lehman (1920–2008): husband of Wendy Vanderbilt
55. Edwin D. Morgan (1921–2001): 1st husband of Nancy Marie Whitney
56. Charles Scribner IV (1921–1995): husband of Jeanette "Joan" Kissel Sunderland
57. Stanley Schachter (1922–1997): husband of Sophia Duckworth
58. Sidney Lumet (1924–2011): 3rd husband of Gloria Vanderbilt
59. Marylou Whitney (1925–2019): 4th wife of Cornelius Vanderbilt Whitney
60. Wyatt Emory Cooper (1927–1978): 4th husband of Gloria Vanderbilt
61. Tina Onassis Niarchos (1929–1974): 2nd wife of John Spencer-Churchill, 11th Duke of Marlborough
62. Mary Lee Ryan (1931–2017): wife of William Amherst Vanderbilt Cecil; a first cousin of First Lady of the United States Jacqueline Kennedy Onassis.
63. Rosalba Neri (born 1939): 3rd wife of Henry Cooke Cushing IV
64. Rosita Spencer-Churchill, Duchess of Marlborough (born 1943): 3rd wife of John Spencer-Churchill, 11th Duke of Marlborough
65. Amanda Burden (born 1944): 1st wife of Carter Burden
66. Neil Balfour (born 1944): 3rd husband of Serena Mary Churchill Russell
67. James Toback (born 1944): 1st husband of Consuelo Sarah Churchill Vanderbilt Russell
68. David Rosengarten (born 1950): husband of Constance Crimmins Childs
69. John Silvester Varley (born 1956): husband of Carolyn Thorn Pease
70. Crispin Odey (born 1959): husband of Nichola Pease
71. Edla Spencer-Churchill, Duchess of Marlborough (born 1968): 2nd wife of James Spencer-Churchill, 12th Duke of Marlborough

== Network ==
=== Associates ===
The following is a list of figures closely aligned with or subordinate to the Vanderbilt family.

- George G. Barnard
- Horace Henry Baxter
- August Belmont Jr.
- Samuel R. Callaway
- Chauncey Depew
- Melville E. Ingalls
- Leonard Jerome
- Oroondates Mauran
- Holland Nimmons McTyeire
- Richard Morris Hunt
- Augustus Schell
- Richard Schell
- Carl A. Schenck
- T. F. Secor
- Winnaretta Singer
- Alfred Holland Smith
- Amasa Stone
- Hamilton McKown Twombly

=== Businesses ===
The following is a list of companies in which the Vanderbilt family have held a controlling or otherwise significant interest.

- Allaire Iron Works
- Beech Creek Railroad
- Big Four Railroad
- The Biltmore Company
- Biltmore Farms
- Boston and Albany Railroad
- Canada Southern Railway
- Chesapeake and Ohio Railway
- Dunkirk, Allegheny Valley & Pittsburgh Railroad
- Fort Wayne and Jackson Railroad
- General Electric
- Gloria Concepts
- Hudson Bay Mining & Smelting Company
- Interborough Rapid Transit Company
- Lake Erie and Western Railroad
- Lake Shore and Michigan Southern Railway
- Michigan Central Railroad
- Mohawk and Malone Railway
- Mythology Entertainment
- New York Central Railroad
- New York and Putnam Railroad
- New York State Railways
- Nickel Plate Road
- Pimlico Race Course
- Pittsburgh and Lake Erie Railroad
- Rome, Watertown and Ogdensburg Railroad
- Rutland Railroad
- Staten Island Ferry
- Staten Island Railway
- Toronto, Hamilton and Buffalo Railway
- Vanderbilt Hotel
- West Shore Railroad
- Western Union

=== Philanthropy & Miscellaneous Nonprofit Organizations ===
- American Women's War Relief Fund
- Biltmore Forest School
- Council on African Affairs
- Foch Hospital
- International Auxiliary Language Association
- The Jockey Club
- Margaret Louisa Home
- Parents' League of New York
- Sleepy Hollow Country Club
- Sloane Hospital for Women
- Vanderbilt Cup
- Vanderbilt Gallery (American Fine Arts Society)
- Vanderbilt Clinic (Presbyterian Hospital)
- Vanderbilt Museum
- Vanderbilt University

== Buildings, estates & historic sites ==
- 1 West 57th Street
- Biltmore Estate
- Blenheim Palace
- The Breakers
- Cathedral of All Souls (Asheville, North Carolina)
- Cornelius Vanderbilt II House
- Eagle's Nest
- Elm Court
- Florham
- Haras du Quesnay
- Howard Mansion and Carriage House'
- Hyde Park Mansion
- Idle Hour
- Marble House
- Petit Chateau
- Pine Tree Point
- Radisson Blu Edwardian Vanderbilt Hotel
- Rough Point
- Sagamore Farm
- Scarborough Presbyterian Church
- Shelburne Farms
- Vanderbilt Family Cemetery and Mausoleum
- Vanderbilt Triple Palace
- Woodlea

== See also ==
- Vanderbilt (surname)
- Nate Archibald (Gossip Girl), fictional Vanderbilt descendant
- Du Pont family
- Rockefeller family
- Rothschild family
