= The Eighth Day (Wilder novel) =

1967 novel by Thornton Wilder

- First edition
- Author: Thornton Wilder
- Language: English
- Published: 1967
- Publisher: Harper & Row
- Publication place: United States
- Awards: 1968 National Book Award

The Eighth Day is a 1967 novel by Thornton Wilder. Set in a mining town in southern Illinois, the plot revolves around John Barrington Ashley, who is accused of murdering his neighbor Breckenridge Lansing. The novel was written over the course of twenty months while Wilder was living alone in Douglas, Arizona. The Eighth Day was the 1968 winner of the National Book Award.

== Synopsis ==
During a weekend gathering of the Ashley and Lansing families, Breckenridge Lansing is shot while the men are practicing shooting. Townsfolk suspect that Eustacia Lansing, Breckenridge's wife, and John Ashley were having an affair. Ashley is tried, convicted, and sentenced to execution. Miraculously, days before the scheduled execution, he is rescued by mysterious masked men. He then escapes to Chile, where he assumes the identity of a Canadian named James Tolland and finds work in the copper mining industry.

While Ashley escapes to Chile, his family—left destitute without his income—turns to running a boarding house to make ends meet. His son, Roger, assumes a fake name and moves to Chicago. After working a series of odd jobs, Roger makes a name for himself as a writer for a newspaper. Ashley's daughter, Lily, also assumes a fake name and becomes a famous singer in Chicago, later moving to New York.

At the end of the book, it is revealed that a group of Native Americans, one of whom was friends with Roger, is responsible for helping Ashley escape his execution. The group did this because, after a flood wiped out their local church, Ashley loaned them money to rebuild it. It is also revealed that Ashely did not kill Lansing; Lansing's son George did, because Lansing was becoming violent towards his wife, George's mother. George feared for his mother's safety, and consequently killed his father and then ran away to San Francisco, and later Russia, to work as an actor.

Though there is a murder mystery in the novel, the main focus of the work is the history of the Ashley and Lansing families. Wilder muses frequently on the nature of written history throughout the book. Towards the end, he writes:

"There is only one history. It began with the creation of man and will come to an end when the last human consciousness is extinguished. All other beginnings and endings are arbitrary conventions — makeshifts parading as self-sufficient entireties… The cumbrous shears of the historian cut out a few figures and a brief passage of time from that enormous tapestry. Above and below the laceration, to the right and left of it, the severed threads protest against the injustice, against the imposture."

The book concludes with a number of flash-forwards describing the rest of the lives of the characters. Ashley's wife, Beata, moves to Los Angeles and starts a boarding house there. Roger marries one of Lansing's daughters. Ashley's daughter Sophia has dementia and moves into a sanitarium. Ashley's daughter Constance becomes a political activist and moves to Japan.

== Critical reception ==
The Eighth Day received the National Book Award in 1968. The New York Times called the book "suspenseful and deeply moving".
