= Catherine Murray di Montezemolo =

American fashion editor

- Born: Catherine Bradley Murray; September 18, 1925
- Died: April 22, 2009 (aged 83)
- Occupation: fashion editor
- Spouse: Alessandro di Montezemolo
- Relatives: Jeanne Murray Vanderbilt (sister); Thomas E. Murray (grandfather)

Catherine Murray di Montezemolo (née Catherine Bradley Murray; September 18, 1925 – April 22, 2009) was an American fashion editor with a prominent position in Southampton society.

Di Montezemolo was born to a wealthy family — her grandfather was the prolific inventor and engineer, Thomas E. Murray, who together with Thomas Edison helped to found the NY-based utility, Con Edison, in the early twentieth century. The Murray family was the main subject of Stephen Birmingham's book Real Lace: America's Irish Rich and John Corry's Golden Clan: The Murrays, the McDonnells, & the Irish American Aristocracy. Di Montezemelo attended Catholic school in Suffern, New York. After graduation, she took a job at Vogue, where she worked for 30 years. She advised and promoted the work of young designers such as Anne Fogarty and Claire McCardell.

Athletic, she was an early student of Joseph Pilates.

In 1945, her eldest sister Jeanne Lourdes Murray (1919–2013) married the American billionaire Alfred Gwynne Vanderbilt Jr.

In 1958, she married an Italian nobleman, Alessandro di Montezemolo (Nobile of the Marchesi di Montezemolo), who was a senior executive at Marsh & McLennan.

In 1961, her other elder sister Patricia Roche Murray (1920–2018) married the American tennis champion Sidney Wood and one year after his death, in 2010, the former U.S. Ambassador Edward N. Ney.

Catherine di Montezemolo and her husband became fixtures in the Southampton, where she spent her summers as a child on a vast beachfront property along Wickapogue Road that came to be known as the "Murray Compound" because so many family members built houses near one another. Until the 1970s, the only residents of the 250-acre (1.0 km^{2}) plot were the Murrays and their cousins, the McDonnells.

She left Vogue in the late 1970s. Later, she designed her own fashion collection and was active in Southampton charity activity.

Di Montezemolo died at age 83 of chronic obstructive pulmonary disease.
