= Jeanne Murray Vanderbilt =

American heiress and socialite

- Born: Jeanne Lourdes Murray; 1919
- Died: December 15, 2013 (aged 93–94)
- Occupations: heiress socialite
- Spouse: Alfred Gwynne Vanderbilt Jr. (m. 1945; div. 1956)
- Children: Alfred Gwynne Vanderbilt III; Heidi Vanderbilt
- Relatives: Catherine Murray di Montezemolo (sister); Thomas E. Murray (grandfather)

Jeanne Lourdes Murray Vanderbilt (1919–2013) was an American heiress and socialite. She was the second wife of Alfred Gwynne Vanderbilt Jr.

== Early life and family ==
Vanderbilt was born Jeanne Lourdes Murray in 1919. She was the eldest child of John Frances Murray, a commissioner of the New York Port Authority. She was the sister of Catherine Murray di Montezemolo and a granddaughter of the inventor and businessman Thomas E. Murray. She was the cousin of Anne McDonnell, the first wife of Henry Ford II. Vanderbilt was an heiress to the Murray family fortune. The Murrays were a wealthy Irish Catholic family prominent in New York City and Southampton.

Vanderbilt grew up at 755 Park Avenue in New York City.

== Adult life ==
Prior to her marriage, Vanderbilt was employed as a publicity agent at the Stork Club. During her marriage, she worked as a production assistant for the David Frost Show.

She married the sportsman and Vanderbilt family heir Alfred Gwynne Vanderbilt Jr. at Philadelphia City Hall on October 13, 1945 following an elopement from New York in a private plane. The ceremony was officiated by the magistrate Nathan A. Beifel in the office of Judge Charles Klein. She was Vanderbilt's second wife. The private ceremony was attended by a friend of the bride and Colonel Sol Rosenblatt, the groom's attorney.

The Vanderbilts had two children, Heidi Murray Vanderbilt and Alfred Gwynne Vanderbilt III. They announced their separation in January 1956 and divorced later that year.

Following her divorce, Vanderbilt lived in New York City, Palm Beach, and Paris.

== Death ==
She died on December 15, 2013.
