= Thomas E. Murray =

- Born: October 21, 1860; Albany, New York
- Died: July 21, 1929 (aged 68); Southampton, Long Island, New York
- Occupations: Inventor, entrepreneur
- Website: Archived October 5, 2016, at the Wayback Machine

Thomas E. Murray (October 21, 1860 – July 21, 1929) was an American inventor and businessman who developed electric power plants for New York City as well as many electrical devices which influenced life around the world, including the dimmer switch and screw-in fuse. It has been said that he "invented everything from the power plant up to the light bulb".

Murray is considered one of the most prolific inventors in history after Thomas Edison, holding 462 U.S. patents in his name. However, unlike Edison, Murray did not patent the work of others under his name; the employee would have the patent in their name, and assign it to the Murray company. Also, if Murray worked with anyone else on an invention, their name would be listed on the patent.

== Early life ==
Thomas E. Murray was born in Albany, New York, to an Irish family and was one of 12 children. He left school upon the death of his father when he was nine to help support his family by working three jobs.

== Career ==
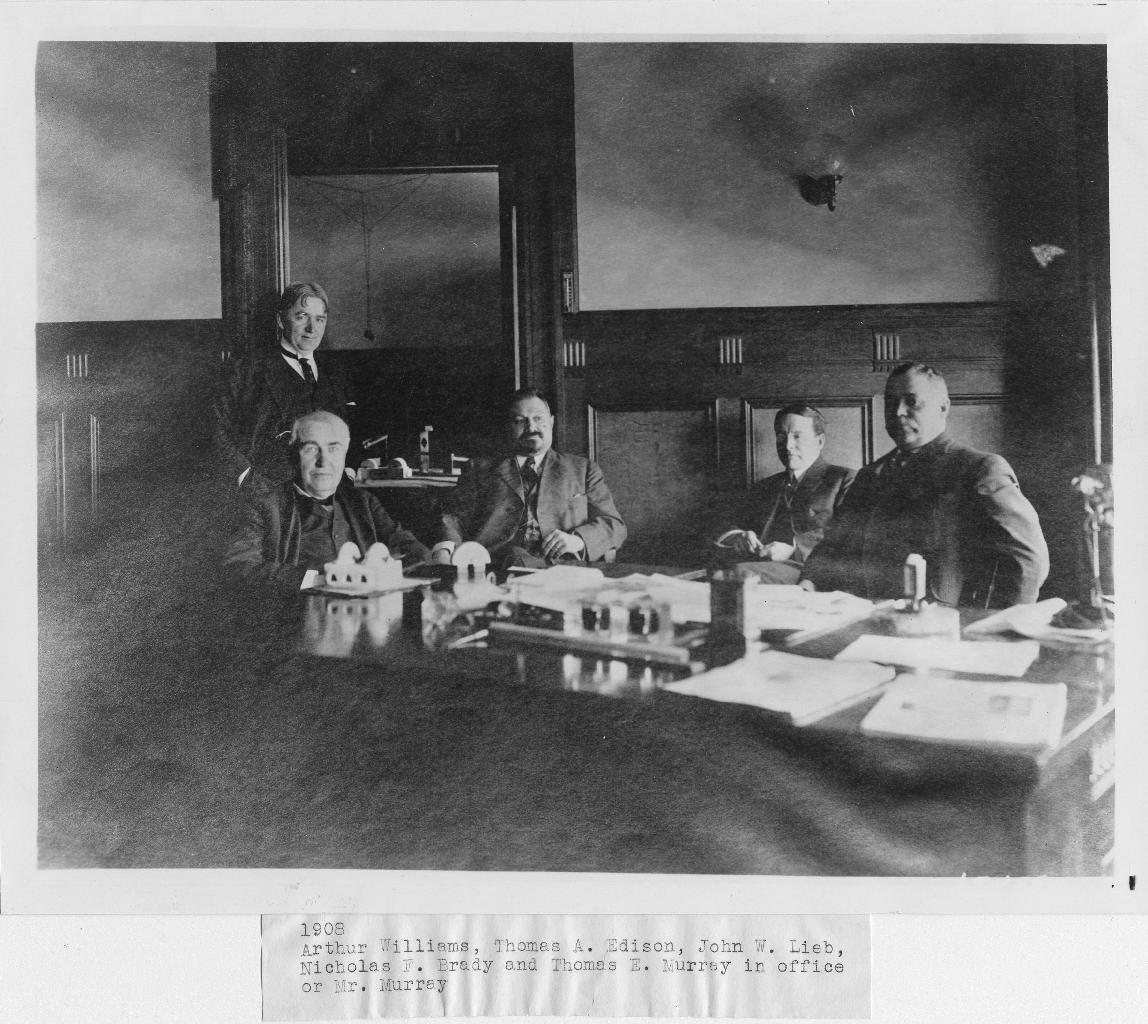
Arthur Williams, Thomas A. Edison, John W. Lieb, Nicholas F. Brady, and Thomas E. Murray in the office of Mr. Murray, 1908.

In 1875, he was an apprentice at the Albany Iron & Machine Works. In 1881, at the age of 21, he became the Chief Engineer of the Albany Waterworks. In 1887, Anthony N. Brady hired Murray to run the power station of the Albany Municipal Gas Co.

Murray was responsible for the power stations that powered New York City for the first half of the 20th century. He eventually was in complete charge of all the allied Edison companies in New York City, Brooklyn, and Westchester.

- 1898: Gold St. in Brooklyn
- 1899: Waterside I and II (1906)
- 1910: Central Power Station in Gowanus
- 1913: Sherman Creek @ 201 St.
- 1921: Hell Gate in South Bronx
- 1924: Hudson Avenue
- 1926: East River Generating Station
- Many in Upstate NY / out of state
- Brooklyn Transit System

== Family ==
His son, Thomas E. Murray Jr., was also an engineer who worked with Thomas Edison.

He was the grandfather of the fashion editor Catherine Murray di Montezemolo, Patricia R. Murray (wife of Sidney Wood and Edward N. Ney) and Jeanne Lourdes Murray (wife of Alfred Gwynne Vanderbilt Jr.).

== Death ==
Thomas E. Murray died on July 21, 1929, at "Wickapogue", his summer estate in Southampton, Long Island, New York.

=== Honors and awards ===
May 4, 2011 Murray was inducted into the National Inventor's Hall of Fame for the Electric Safety Fuse 920,613.

In 1910, Murray won the Edward Longstreth Medal from the Franklin Institute.

== Books and publications ==
- Report on the power station possibilities of the Kent Avenue property of the Brooklyn Heights Railroad Company Thomas E. Murray, consulting engineer. April 1903.
- Specifications for the Williamsburg power house of the Transit development company Thomas E. Murray, consulting engineer (1905)
- Electric power plants; a description of a number of power stations designed by Thomas Edward Murray (1910).
- Power Stations, by Thomas Edward Murray (1922).
- Applied engineering, by Thomas Edward Murray. : Applied engineering, by Thomas Edward Murray (1928)

== See also ==
- Dad's in Heaven with Nixon is a 2010 documentary film produced, directed and written by Tom Murray, the great-grandson of Thomas E. Murray. It concerns the history of the Murray family and Tom's brother Chris Murray, an artist affected by autism. It briefly covers Thomas E. Murray's career and as a father through pictures and narration.
- Golden Clan, a non-fiction account of the Murray / McDonnell family of New York, by John Corry
