= Alfred Gwynne Vanderbilt Jr. =

British-American businessman and racehorse owner (1912–1999)

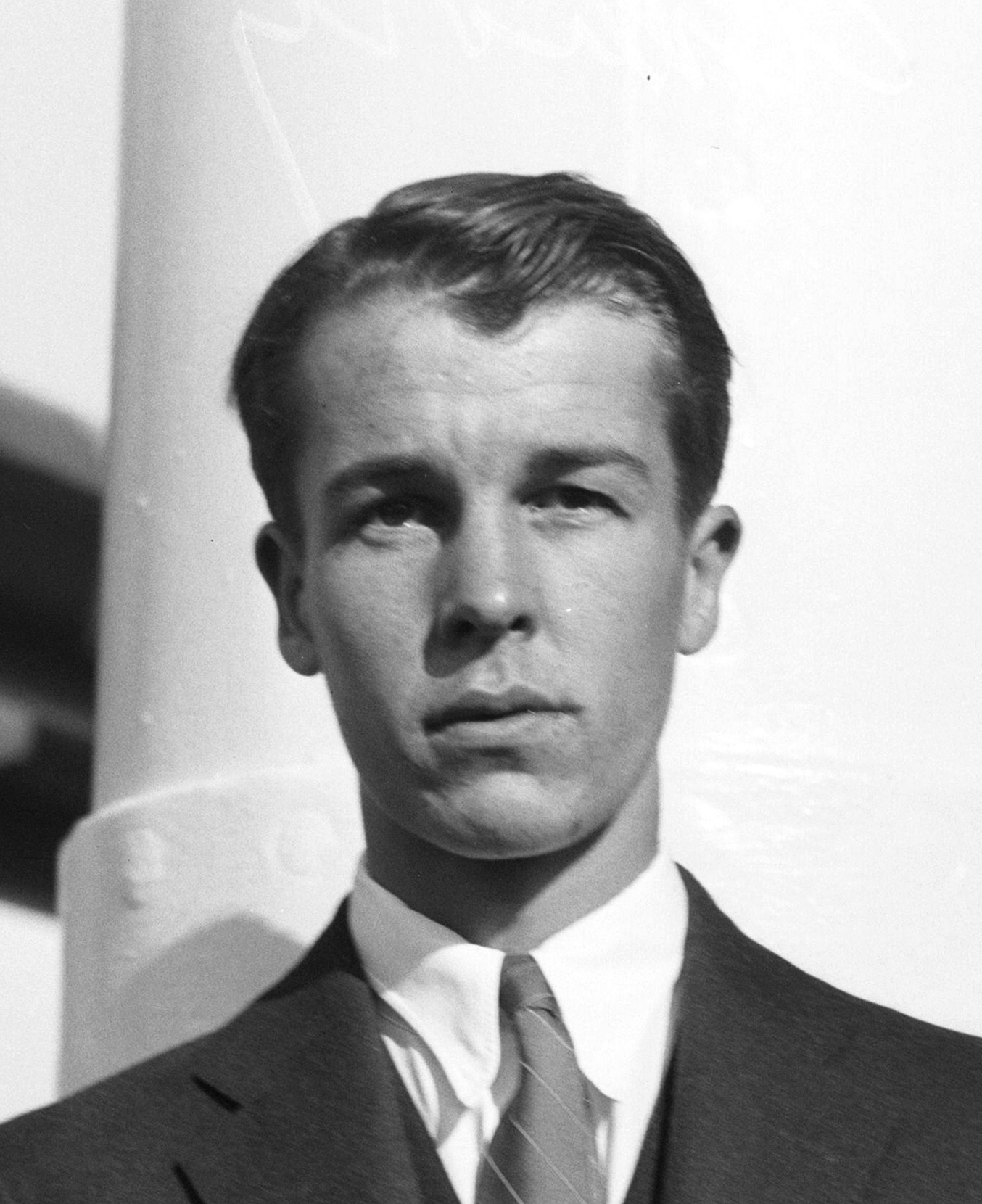
- Vanderbilt, c. 1937
- Born: September 22, 1912; London, England
- Died: November 12, 1999 (aged 87); Mill Neck, New York, U.S.
- Burial place: Vanderbilt Family Mausoleum, Staten Island, New York, U.S.
- Education: St. Paul's School; Yale University
- Occupation: Thoroughbred racehorse / racetrack owner
- Spouses: Manuela Mercedes Hudson (m. 1938; div. 1942) Jeanne Lourdes Murray (m. 1945; div. 1956) Jean Harvey (m. 1957; div. 1975)
- Children: 6, including Alfred Gwynne Vanderbilt III and Heidi Vanderbilt
- Parent(s): Alfred Gwynne Vanderbilt; Margaret Emerson
- Family: Vanderbilt family

Alfred Gwynne Vanderbilt Jr. (September 22, 1912 – November 12, 1999) was a British-born member of the prominent Vanderbilt railroad family, and a noted figure of American thoroughbred horse racing. He was the youngest-ever member of The Jockey Club, president of Belmont Racetrack, New York, and Pimlico Race Course, Baltimore, and chairman of the board of the New York Racing Association. In World War II, he was decorated for bravery in the South Pacific.

== Early life ==
=== Family ===
Born in London, England, Vanderbilt was the first child of Alfred Gwynne Vanderbilt I by his second wife Margaret Emerson Vanderbilt. He had one older half-brother William Henry Vanderbilt III, who had been the product of Alfred Vanderbilt Senior's first marriage to Ellen Elsie French Vanderbilt, and his parents would go on to have another child, George Washington Vanderbilt III in 1914.

During their respective lifetimes both his mother and father inherited substantial fortunes from each of their fathers; his mother Margaret Emerson Vanderbilt was the only child of the wealthy Bromo-Seltzer inventor Isaac Edward Emerson, whilst his father Alfred G. Vanderbilt I was the main beneficiary of the estate of his own millionaire father, Cornelius Vanderbilt II.

By the time Alfred was born the Vanderbilts were well-established as one of the wealthiest families in the United States. During the second half of the nineteenth century, Alfred's great-grandfather, William Henry Vanderbilt I had become the richest man in the world after inheriting (and subsequently doubling the value of) the bulk of the shipping and railroad fortune which his own father Cornelius the Commodore Vanderbilt I had founded.

Prior to Alfred's third birthday, his father Alfred G. Vanderbilt I died as a result of the sinking of the RMS Lusitania in May 1915. Shortly after his father's death, Alfred's mother Margaret purchased "Holmwood", a 47-room mansion surrounding by a 300-acre estate in Lenox, Massachusetts, which was the family's home for much of Alfred's childhood. In 1918 his mother remarried the Director of the United States Mint Raymond T. Baker, and Alfred's half-sister Gloria Baker was born in 1920. His mother and stepfather were later divorced in 1928, and in the same year Margaret was married for a fourth and final time to Charles Minot Amory, from whom she was also divorced in 1934.

=== Education ===
Alfred was educated at St. Paul's School and at Yale, where he entered with the class of 1935, but did not graduate. His mother, Margaret Emerson, gave him a 600-acre (2.4 km^{2}) horse farm in Glyndon, Maryland, called Sagamore Farm, for his 21st birthday, and it was in thoroughbred horse racing that he made his mark. The Vanderbilt family had by then given up control of most of their former railroad interests. Alfred G. Vanderbilt was President of Belmont Racetrack in New York and was the principal owner and president of Pimlico Race Course in Baltimore.

=== War Service ===
When he was called into service for World War II, he captained a PT boat in the South Pacific, earning the Silver Star for bravery. He was promoted to lieutenant, junior grade on March 2, 1944. On his discharge, he returned to racing in a major way.

== Inheritance ==
=== 1915–1929: Father's estate ===
Following the unexpected death of Alfred's father Alfred G. Vanderbilt I in 1915, the bulk of the latter's estate was bequeathed to his three sons and widow. Under the terms of his father's will, Alfred and his brother George W. Vanderbilt III were named co-beneficiaries of the residuary estate, which initially amounted to approximately $5,100,000; records from the New York Surrogate's Court in 1917 confirmed that Alfred's initial share of his father's wealth amounted to $2,553,204.

The portion of the estate bequeathed to Alfred and his brother George were to be each to be held in a trust under they each came of age, although the income would be payable to him until he reached adulthood. The trust assets would vest into Alfred's absolute ownership at various stages of his life; his father's will specified that he would come into full ownership of 25% of the capital on his 21st, 25th, 30th, and 35th birthdays.

Alfred's mother Margaret Emerson Vanderbilt inherited $3,000,000 outright from her late husband, as well as a life interest in the income from a $5,000,000 trust fund, after which this trust was to vest in equal shares to Alfred and his brother George.

In 1919 approximately $850,000 was added to Alfred's trust fund as a consequence of an additional $1,700,000 devolving upon the residuary estate of Alfred's father; this amount represented the principal of a trust fund which had been created as part of Alfred Sr.’s divorce settlement with his first wife, Elsie French. This trust was to revert into Alfred Vanderbilt Senior's ownership the event of Elsie's remarriage; as he had died prior to her remarriage, the trust assets became part of his residuary estate.

In 1929 an additional $1,000,000 was added to Alfred's trust fund as the result of a ruling by the Surrogate's Court of New York concerning approximately $2,000,000 held in a trust fund established for the benefit of his grandmother, Alice Claypoole Vanderbilt, under the will of Alfred's grandfather Cornelius Vanderbilt II. The court ruling found that this Trust had accumulated more income and principal than was required to satisfy the terms of the will of Cornerlius Vanderbilt II, which had provided a $250,000 annuity for life to his widow Alice. The court held that a surplus funds accured by the trust, amounting to approximately $2,000,000, should revert to the residuary estate of Cornelius Vanderbilt II, who had bequeathed his residuary estate to Alfred G. Vanderbilt Sr. However, as Alfred Vanderbilt Sr had also died prior to this Court ruling, the funds were also deemed to be part of his residuary estate, and thus devolved in equal shares upon Alfred and his brother George.

A report submitted to the New York Surrogate's Court in October 1943 by the executors of Alfred's father Alfred G. Vanderbilt Sr.'s estate confirmed that due to the additional trust reversions and court rulings concerning the estates of Alfred's father and grandfather, the initial value of the residuary estate of Alfred's father had increased to approximately $8,450,000, and that Alfred and his brother George had ultimately inherited $4,227,717 each from their father's estate.

By 1943 Alfred had reached the age of 31, and had been paid a total of $6,727,514 in income and capital distributions from the trust fund his father had bequeathed to him. The remaining amount held in this trust fund was then noted to be $2,002,989, from which Alfred would continue to receive the income until the remaining trust capital vested into his full ownership on his 35th birthday.

=== 1934: Estate of Alice G. Vanderbilt ===
Alfred, his brother George W. Vanderbilt III, and their older half-brother William H. Vanderbilt III shared a $500,000 bequest made in the will of their paternal grandmother Alice Claypoole Vanderbilt following her death in 1934.

=== 1931: Estate of Isaac Edward Emerson ===
Approximately $9 million of the $12.7 million estate of Alfred's maternal grandfather, Isaac Edward Emerson, was placed in a 20-year Trust following Emerson's death in 1931. Under the terms of his grandfather's will, Alfred was to receive 2% of the annual income, and 2% of the Trust Capital when it vested in 1951. His mother Margaret and her step-mother each received a 35.5% share of the trust. The value of the Trust was reported to be approximately $6,000,000 when the Trust vested in 1951, indicating that Alfred's share would amount to $120,000, and his mother's share as $2,130,000.

=== 1940: Profile in The New Yorker ===
A 1940 profile of Alfred published in The New Yorker magazine quoted Alfred as stating that contemporary estimates of his wealth ranging to $20 million were grossly exaggerated. Alfred asserted that he was worth approximately $8,500,000 in 1940, although this included funds held in Trust for his benefit.

== Thoroughbred racing ==
Vanderbilt was one of the original members of the Westchester Racing Association and a driving force behind thoroughbred racing in America for most of the 20th century. His mother, Margaret Emerson, took him to his first race, the Preakness Stakes, in 1922. He often said, "After that, I was hooked." On his 21st birthday, his mother gave him Sagamore Farm, her racing operation in Reisterstown, Maryland, which she had inherited from her father, Isaac Emerson, who invented Bromo-Seltzer and founded the Emerson Drug Company, which later became Warner-Lambert.

Vanderbilt personally oversaw the breeding and training of his stable. His first major acquisition was Discovery, one of the great handicap horses of the age, who became his foundation sire.

At age 20 in 1932, he bought Pimlico Race Course outside Baltimore. Three years later, Vanderbilt was elected to The Jockey Club, the youngest member in its history. In 1938, he arranged the famous match race between Seabiscuit and War Admiral. He was president of Belmont Park and Pimlico at the same time before joining the Navy.

During World War II, he captained a PT boat in the South Pacific and was awarded the Silver Star for bravery under fire.

He then returned to racing, bringing his greatest champion, Native Dancer, to the track in 1952. Native Dancer won all 9 starts as a 2-year-old and was named Horse of the Year. He won every start as a three-year-old except the Kentucky Derby, which he lost by a head to Cain Hoy Stable's Dark Star. Still, Native Dancer was named 3-year-old Male Champion and was Horse of the Year again in his 4th year. All told, he won 21 of 22 starts, with the single second-place finish in the 1953 Kentucky Derby his only career loss. Many consider the Grey Ghost of Sagamore to have been the first Thoroughbred television star, and TV Guide ranked him as a top icon of the era".

He eventually campaigned four national champions: Discovery, Next Move, Bed O' Roses, and Native Dancer.

Vanderbilt continued racing throughout his life and served as chairman of the board of the New York Racing Association from 1971 to 1975. The New York Turf Writers voted him "The Man Who Did The Most for Racing" a record four times, posthumously renaming the award in his honor.

== Personal life ==
Vanderbilt was married three times. His first marriage was in 1938 to Manuela Mercedes Hudson (1920–1978), a niece of racehorse owner Charles S. Howard. The couple separated and began living apart in December 1940. Before their divorce in 1942, they were the parents of:

- Wendy Maria Vanderbilt (1939–2016), an artist who married Orin Lehman (1920–2008), the long-serving commissioner of the New York State Office of Parks and Recreation.

His second marriage was on October 13, 1945, to Jeanne Lourdes Murray (1919–2013), a sister of Catherine Murray di Montezemolo and granddaughter of Thomas E. Murray. Before their divorce in 1956, they were the parents of:

- Heidi Murray Vanderbilt (1948–2021), who married Jones Harris (b. 1929), the son of actors Ruth Gordon and Jed Harris, in 1971. They had a son named Jack Harris in 1972. Heidi made her Broadway debut in 1965 in Gordon's A Very Rich Woman, along with Katharine Houghton. She published her first novel, The Scar Rule, on her 72nd birthday.
- Alfred Gwynne Vanderbilt III (b. 1949), who married Alison Campbell Platten in 1971. He is the father of screenwriter James Vanderbilt.

In 1957, he married for the third time to Jean Harvey (b. 1937) of the Cudahy meat-packing empire. Before their eventual divorce in 1975, they were the parents of:

- Nicholas Harvey Vanderbilt (1958–1984), who went missing on Mount Robson in British Columbia, and was presumed dead.
- Victoria Emerson Vanderbilt (b. 1959), who married James Weiss.
- Michael Daggett Vanderbilt (b. 1967), who was born in Saratoga Springs, New York, and graduated from Trinity College (Connecticut) in 1989.

He died November 12, 1999, at his home in Mill Neck, New York after attending the morning racehorse workouts, two months after his 87th birthday. He was buried in the Vanderbilt Mausoleum on Staten Island, New York.

== In popular culture ==
In the early 1950s, he was a regular panelist on the NBC game show Who Said That? along with H. V. Kaltenborn, Boris Karloff, and American actress Dagmar.

== See also ==
- Vanderbilt family
