= Alfred Gwynne Vanderbilt III =

American executive (born 1949)

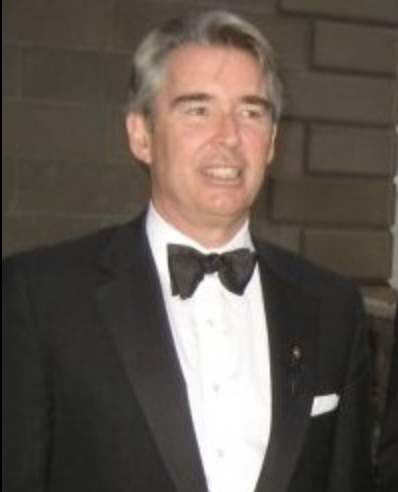
- Born: December 20, 1949 (age 76); New York City, New York
- Occupation: Public Relations Executive
- Spouse: Alison Campbell Platten (m. 1971; div. 2016)
- Children: James Platten Vanderbilt; Travis Murray Vanderbilt
- Parent(s): Alfred Gwynne Vanderbilt Jr. Jeanne Lourdes Murray
- Family: See Vanderbilt

Alfred Gwynne Vanderbilt III (born December 20, 1949) is a retired public relations executive. Vanderbilt was heavily involved in the return of the Grammys to New York. He also organized operation sail, a plan to bring tall ships to the New York Harbor for the 500th anniversary of Columbus's journey to the Americas. He is the father of James Platten Vanderbilt, son of Alfred Gwynne Vanderbilt Jr., and the grandson of Alfred Gwynne Vanderbilt. His great-grandfather, Cornelius Vanderbilt II, was one of America's most revered businessmen; his great-great-grandfather, William Henry Vanderbilt was the richest man in the world.

== Early years ==
Vanderbilt graduated from the Buckley School in New York in 1964. His family traveled extensively and some of his high school years were spent in other countries before graduating from Loyola School in New York.

Vanderbilt started a Rock 'n Roll band called The Four Fifths in 1965. The band was signed to Columbia Records and released "If You Still Want Me" and "Have You Ever Loved A Girl", published by Scope Music Inc. (BMI) in November 1966, record JZSP 116493 and 116494.

== Career ==
Vanderbilt did not follow his father into the family horse-racing business, instead forming a career in public relations. Vanderbilt started working as an associate at Carl Byoir & Associations in New York City in 1981, and worked at other firms including Hill and Knowlton, Inc. before starting his own agency, The Vanderbilt Agency, New York City, in 1990 where he was president and chief executive officer before retiring in 2017.

== Vanderbilt Cemetery Association ==
In 2010, Vanderbilt created the Vanderbilt Cemetery Association to preserve the Vanderbilt family mausoleum and cemetery at the Moravian Cemetery in New Dorp on Staten Island, New York.

== Personal life ==
Vanderbilt became engaged to Alison Platten in June 1971 and they married on August 18, 1971. Together they have two children:

- James Platten Vanderbilt (b. November 1975), who was married in May 2005 to Amber Freeman, daughter of Allan Freeman and Gunilla Hutton. The couple have three sons.
- Travis Murray Vanderbilt (b. January 1981) who married Meghan Knutson in September 2014.

Alfred and Alison Vanderbilt were divorced in 2016.

Vanderbilt has organized Vanderbilt family reunions and lectures about the Vanderbilts.

== See also ==
- Vanderbilt family
