= Our Crowd =

1967 book by Stephen Birmingham

- Softcover edition
- Author: Stephen Birmingham
- Language: English
- Subject: History
- Genre: Non-fiction
- Publisher: Harper & Row
- Publication date: 1967
- Publication place: United States
- Media type: Print
- Pages: 404 pp (softcover)
- ISBN: 978-0815604112

Our Crowd: The Great Jewish Families of New York (1967) is a history book by American writer Stephen Birmingham. The book documents the lives of prominent New York Jewish families of the 19th century. Historian Louis Auchincloss called it "A fascinating and absorbing chapter of New York social and financial history. ... " It has been reprinted 14 times as of 2007.

== Review ==
The reception which has been accorded "Our Crowd" shows that the subject was certainly ripe for exploitation. The book has been a best-seller for the past several months; indeed, it has been at the head of the non-fiction list for much of that time. What is more, no one has yet challenged the claim put forward by the book of an exalted social position for Jews. In fact, the opposite has been the case. Louis Auchincloss, who has devoted his talents to the delineation of the WASP upper class of the New York Metropolitan area, has even said that it is hard to understand why "Our Crowd" should only have been the first account of the Jewish upper class.

— Review by Commentary Magazine

== Official information ==
- Birmingham, Stephen (1967). "Our Crowd: The Great Jewish Families of New York (1967). New York: Harper & Row. ISBN 9781579124359.
