= Stephen Birmingham =

American author (1929–2015)

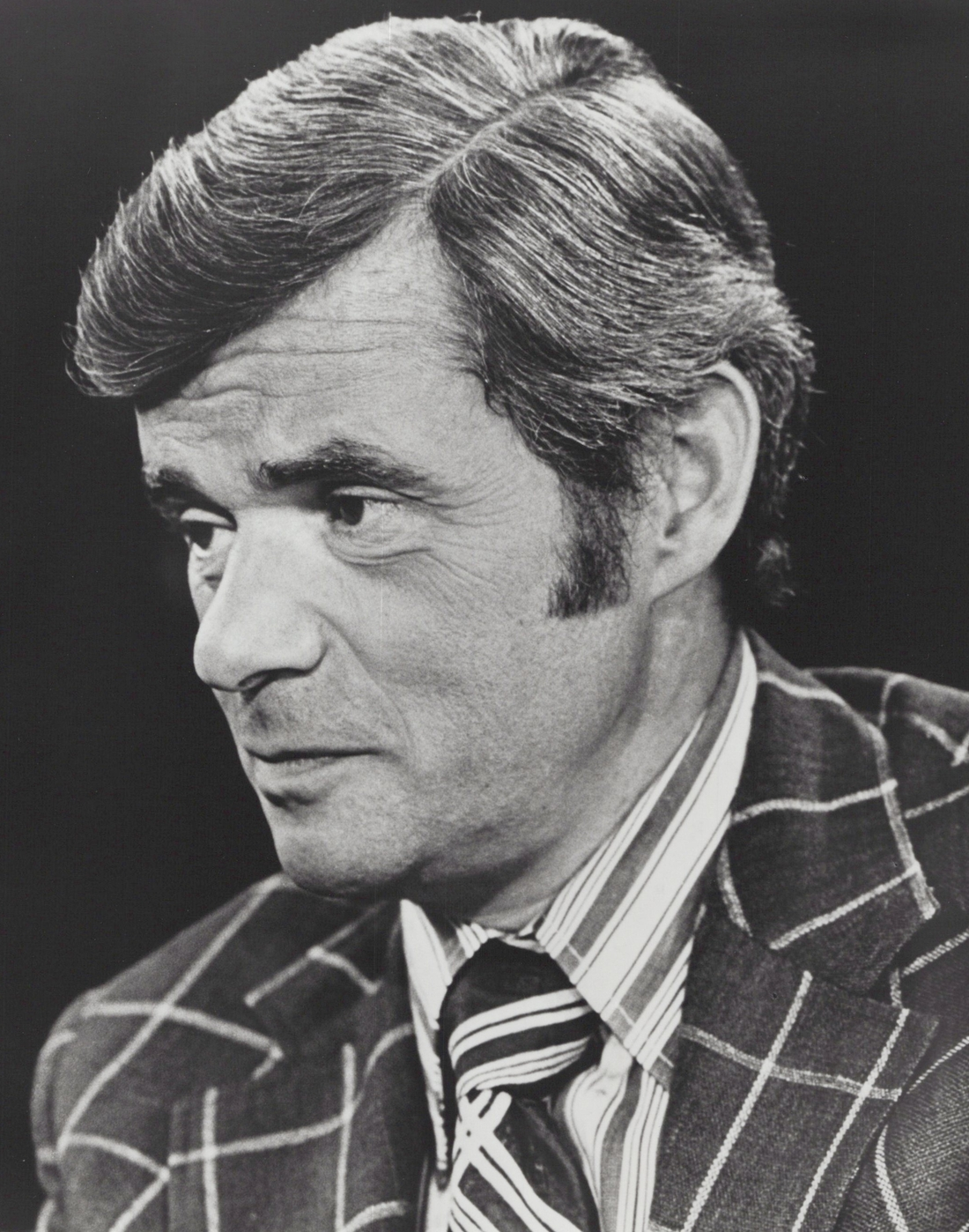
- Birmingham in 1972
- Born: Stephen Gardner Birmingham; May 28, 1929; Andover, Connecticut
- Died: November 15, 2015 (aged 86); Manhattan, New York
- Education: Williams College
- Occupation: Author
- Notable work: Our Crowd: The Great Jewish Families of New York
- Spouse: Janet Tillson (m. 1953; div. 1974)

Stephen Gardner Birmingham (May 28, 1929 – November 15, 2015) was an American author known for his social histories of wealthy American families, often focusing on ethnicity — Jews (his "Jewish trilogy": Our Crowd, The Grandees, The Rest of Us), African-Americans (Certain People), Irish (Real Lace), and the Anglo-Dutch (America's Secret Aristocracy). He also wrote several novels, also about wealthy people.

== Biography ==
Birmingham was born in Andover, Connecticut in 1929 to Editha Birmingham (née Gardner) and Thomas Birmingham, a lawyer of Irish descent. He was not born into an upper-class family, but attended the elite Hotchkiss School, of which he later recalled "there were no blacks, maybe one Chinese person, who was the son of a missionary, and a quota on Jews."

He received a Bachelor of Arts degree in English from Williams College in 1950, and then worked as an advertising copywriter for Needham Harper Steers (now DDB Worldwide) in New York City. Among his clients was the popular magazine Ladies' Home Journal, for which Birmingham was credited with coining the slogan "Never underestimate the power of a woman."

He was a teacher of writing at the University of Cincinnati and also studied for a time in England. He married Janet Tillson in 1953 and they had three children, but later divorced.

Birmingham had a great interest in the upper classes, and wrote numerous books about the wealthy in the United States, generally focusing on their ethnicity, national origins, and geographic locale. His biographies include those of Jacqueline Kennedy Onassis, Wallis Warfield Windsor, and novelist John Marquand. His study of the African-American upper class — Certain People — generated some controversy and was panned by The New York Times.

His other books, however, were often acclaimed. His trilogy of books on American Jews: Our Crowd: The Great Jewish Families of New York, The Grandees: America's Sephardic Elite, and The Rest of Us: The Rise of America's Eastern European Jews are perhaps his best known works. Our Crowd was on The New York Times Bestseller List for 47 weeks; its notoriety led to people often mistakenly assuming Birmingham was Jewish himself.

Birmingham died on November 15, 2015, at the age of 86 in New York City, from lung cancer.

== Works ==
=== Non-fiction ===
- Birmingham, Stephen (1992). "What Made Maria Do It?". In Kolowrat, Ernest (ed.). Hotchkiss: A Chronicle of an American School. New York: New Amsterdam Books. pp. 1–12. ISBN 1-56131-058-1.
- Birmingham, Stephen (1987). America's Secret Aristocracy. Boston: Little, Brown. ISBN 0-316-09650-4.
- Birmingham, Stephen (1985). The Ordeals—and Triumphs—of American Jews. Radnor: Triangle Publications.
- Birmingham, Stephen (1984). The Rest of Us: The Rise of America's Eastern European Jews. Boston: Little, Brown. ISBN 0-316-09647-4.
- Birmingham, Stephen (1982). The Grandes Dames. New York: Simon & Schuster. ISBN 0-671-25585-1.
- Birmingham, Stephen (1981). Duchess: The Story of Wallis Warfield Windsor. Boston: Little, Brown. ISBN 0-316-09643-1.
- Birmingham, Stephen (1980). California Rich. New York: Simon & Schuster. ISBN 0-671-24127-3.
- Birmingham, Stephen (1979). Life at the Dakota: New York's Most Unusual Address. New York: Random House. ISBN 0-394-41079-3.
- Birmingham, Stephen (1978). The Golden Dream: Suburbia in the Seventies. New York: Harper & Row. ISBN 0-060-10334-5.
- Birmingham, Stephen (1978). Jacqueline Bouvier Kennedy Onassis. New York: Grosset & Dunlap. ISBN 0-448-14306-2.
- Birmingham, Stephen (1977). Certain People: America's Black Elite. Little, Brown. ISBN 0-316-09642-3.
- Birmingham, Stephen (1973). The Right Places. Boston: Little, Brown. ISBN 0-316-09641-5.
- Birmingham, Stephen (1973). Real Lace: America's Irish Rich. New York: Harper & Row. ISBN 0-060-10336-1.
- Birmingham, Stephen (1972). The Late John Marquand: A Biography. Philadelphia: J. B. Lippincott & Co. ISBN 0-397-00886-4.
- Birmingham, Stephen (1971). The Grandees: America's Sephardic Elite. New York: Harper & Row. OCLC 130038.
- Birmingham, Stephen (1968). The Right People: A Portrait of the American Social Establishment. Boston: Little, Brown.
- Birmingham, Stephen (1967). Our Crowd: The Great Jewish Families of New York. New York: Harper & Row.

=== Fiction ===
Short stories

- Birmingham, Stephen (1968). Heart Troubles, Short Stories. New York: Harper & Row. ISBN 0-582-10014-3.

Novels

- Birmingham, Stephen (1998). The Wrong Kind of Money. New York: Penguin Books. ISBN 0-451-19304-0.
- Birmingham, Stephen. (1993). Carriage Trade. Bantam.
- Birmingham, Stephen (1991). The Rothman Scandal. Boston: Little, Brown. ISBN 0-316-09654-7.
- Birmingham, Stephen (1989). Shades of Fortune. New York: Jove Books. ISBN 0-515-10844-8.
- Birmingham, Stephen (1986). The LeBaron Secret. New York: Berkley Publishing Group. ISBN 0-425-09633-5.
- Birmingham, Stephen (1983). The Auerbach Will. New York: Berkley Books. ISBN 0-425-07101-4.
- Birmingham, Stephen (1964). Those Harper Women: A Novel. McGraw-Hill.
- Birmingham, Stephen (1959). Barbara Greer. Little Brown & Co.
- Birmingham, Stephen (1966). Fast Start, Fast Finish
- Birmingham, Stephen (1961). The Tower of Love
- Birmingham, Stephen (1958). Young Mr Keefe
