= Duchess of Marlborough =

Duchess of Marlborough is a title held by the wives of the Dukes of Marlborough and may refer to:

- Sarah Churchill, Duchess of Marlborough (née Jenyns, 1660–1744), wife of the 1st Duke
- Henrietta Godolphin, 2nd Duchess of Marlborough (1681–1733), suo jure Duchess, daughter of the 1st Duke
- Elizabeth Spencer, Duchess of Marlborough (née Trevor, died 1761), wife of the 3rd Duke
- Caroline Spencer, Duchess of Marlborough (née Russell, 1742–1811), wife of the 4th Duke
- Susan Spencer-Churchill, Duchess of Marlborough (née Stewart, 1767–1841), wife of the 5th Duke
- Jane Spencer-Churchill, Duchess of Marlborough (1798–1844) (née Stewart), first wife of the 6th Duke
- The Hon. Charlotte Augusta Flower (1818–1850), second wife of the 6th Duke
- Jane Francis Clinton Stewart (1817–1897), third wife of the 6th Duke
- Frances Spencer-Churchill, Duchess of Marlborough (née Vane, 1822–1899), wife of the 7th Duke
- Albertha Spencer-Churchill, Duchess of Marlborough (née Hamilton, 1847–1932), first wife of the 8th Duke
- Lily Spencer-Churchill, Duchess of Marlborough (née Price, 1854–1909), second wife of the 8th Duke
- Consuelo Vanderbilt (1877–1964), first wife of the 9th Duke
- Gladys Spencer-Churchill, Duchess of Marlborough (née Deacon, 1881–1977), second wife of the 9th Duke
- Mary Spencer-Churchill, Duchess of Marlborough (née Cadogan, 1900–1961), first wife of the 10th Duke
- Laura Spencer-Churchill, Duchess of Marlborough (née Charteris, 1915–1990), second wife of the 10th Duke
- Rosita Spencer-Churchill, Duchess of Marlborough (née Douglas, born 1943), third wife of the 11th Duke
- Lily Mahtani (born 1957), fourth wife of the 11th Duke
- Rebecca Mary Few Brown (born 1957), first wife of the 12th Duke
- Edla Griffiths(born 1968), second wife of the 12th Duke

== Other uses ==
- Duchess of Marlborough (Fabergé egg)
