= Sunny Marlborough =

Sunny Marlborough is the nickname of:

- Charles Spencer-Churchill, 9th Duke of Marlborough (1871–1934)
- John Spencer-Churchill, 11th Duke of Marlborough (1926–2014)
