= Lombard House, London =

Lombard House
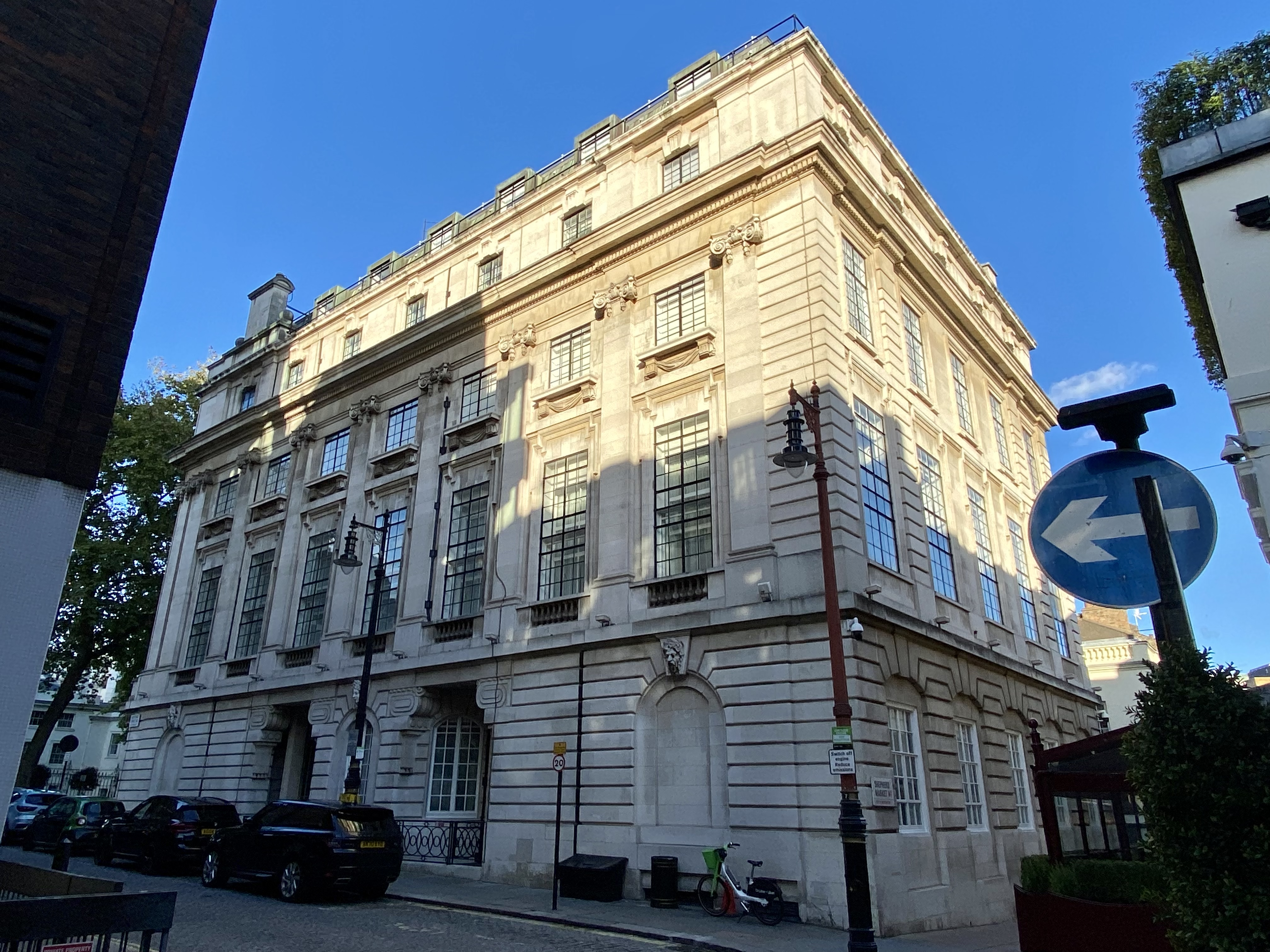
- The Hertford Street side of Lombard House
- Interactive map of the Lombard House area
- Former names: Sunderland House

General information
- Architectural style: Classical with Baroque and Beaux Arts details
- Location: 2B Trebeck Street, Mayfair, London, England
- Year built: 1901–1904

Design and construction
- Architects: Disputed: W. H. Romaine-Walker and C. W. Stephens or Achille Duchêne

Lombard House (originally Sunderland House) is a Grade II listed detached town mansion at the corner of Curzon Street and Trebeck Street in the Mayfair district of London, England. It occupies an entire island block bordered by Curzon Street to the north, Trebeck Street to the east, Shepherds Market to the south, and Hertford Street to the west. The house was built between 1901 and 1904 as a London residence for Charles Spencer-Churchill, 9th Duke of Marlborough and his American heiress wife, Consuelo Vanderbilt, whose father, railroad millionaire William Kissam Vanderbilt, funded the purchase of the building site and the construction of the house. In the months following the conclusion of the First World War, Sunderland House was used as the temporary London headquarters of the League of Nations.

Used primarily for commercial purposes from the 1930s onwards, the house sustained significant damage during The Blitz, with only the external masonry surviving the war. The building acquired the name 'Lombard House' during its period of use by the Lombard Bank from the mid-1950s until the late 1990s. The building was reconverted into a private residence during the early 2000s.

== History ==
=== Origins ===
Built on the cleared site of the Curzon Street Chapel (demolished in 1899), Sunderland House was financed by William Kissam Vanderbilt as a gift for his daughter Consuelo, who had married the ninth Duke of Marlborough in 1895.

Consuelo records in her 1953 memoir The Glitter and the Gold that the Dukes of Marlborough had not maintained a permanent London residence during the later decades of the nineteenth century. During the early years of their marriage, the couple took various short‑term leases on townhouses in London. During Consuelo's first London season (May to July 1896), a small house in South Audley Street was leased. In the 1890s, London's social and political life was centered on a series of palatial aristocratic and royal townhouses. Consuelo's memoir records the lasting impression made on her by the grand settings these homes provided for near‑nightly receptions, dinners, and events during her first London season, including at:

- Marlborough House, the London home of the Prince of Wales
- Lansdowne House, the London base of the then Secretary of State for Foreign Affairs, Henry Petty-Fitzmaurice, 5th Marquess of Lansdowne
- Devonshire House, belonging to the Duke of Devonshire
- Montagu House, belonging to the Duke of Buccleuch
- Apsley House, belonging to the Duke of Wellington
- Grosvenor House, belonging to the Duke of Westminster
- Hampden House, London home of the Duke of Abercorn
- Holland House, the London home of Henry Fox-Strangways, 5th Earl of Ilchester, and site of the traditional end‑of‑season ball
- Buckingham Palace, the official residence of the Sovereign and the location of Consuelo's formal presentation at court following her marriage

In 1897, the Marlboroughs took a lease of Spencer House, where their first child, John Spencer-Churchill, Marquess of Blandford, was born on 18 September. Consuelo felt the house was a fitting place for the birth, as the Dukes of Marlborough were descendants of the Spencer family.

==== A permanent London base ====
Having entered London society during the zenith of the splendor and influence associated with London's palatial aristocratic mansions, Consuelo attributed the construction of Sunderland House to her husband's decision to embark on a political career (his appointment as Paymaster General in 1899 was succeeded by his elevation to Under-Secretary of State for the Colonies in 1903). She records that "with my husband embarked on a political career it seemed advisable to have a permanent establishment in London rather than lease a different house every year. I only had to mention our wish for my father to promise its fulfillment."

Contemporary newspapers record that Consuelo Vanderbilt's father, William K. Vanderbilt, and her husband, the ninth Duke of Marlborough, initially made inquiries as to whether the family's former London seat, Marlborough House, could be recovered from the Crown Estate. When it became clear this was not possible, Vanderbilt purchased a rare freehold parcel of land on Curzon Street for US$380,000. According to Consuelo, freehold properties in the capital were difficult to obtain, as the most desirable districts were dominated by great landlords—such as the Duke of Westminster, Viscount Portman, and the Earl Cadogan, who each reportedly preferred to lease rather than sell their estates; in her memoirs Consuelo observed that "to find a freehold, however small, was therefore an achievement." Other sources suggest the site of the demolished Curzon Street Chapel was purchased for £26,000 (US$130,000).

The site acquired—formerly occupied by the Curzon Street Chapel—became the location for a large mansion approximately 60 feet wide and 100 feet deep. Construction commenced in 1901 and was completed in 1904. William Vanderbilt reportedly spent US$500,000 on construction and over US$1,000,000 on interiors and furnishings, bringing the total cost of Sunderland House to more than US$2,500,000.

The question of a name for the house was raised by the Prince of Wales at a dinner held at his London residence, Marlborough House. The Prince also expressed his view that the site was ill‑chosen owing to the proximity of the new house to a slum near Curzon Street. Consuelo ventured both "Blandford House" and "Sunderland House", with the latter ultimately chosen (the titles Marquess of Blandford and Earl of Sunderland were among the many subsidiary titles held by the Duke of Marlborough).

=== Residence of Consuelo, Duchess of Marlborough ===
Following completion of the house, the Duke and Duchess were honored with a visit from King Edward VII and Queen Alexandra at a dinner at their new London home in March 1905. The building had only recently been completed and occupied when the royal dinner took place. According to Mary S. Lovell, Consuelo and the Duke had not yet finished furnishing the house when they moved in.

Lovell also notes that Sunderland House was the first residence Consuelo was able to furnish according to her own tastes. She selected French antiques and modern domestic amenities, including bathrooms and heating, in contrast to the limited modern comforts she had found on her arrival at the Duke's ancestral seat, Blenheim Palace. In contrast to Blenheim, Sunderland House is described by Lovell as "her [Consuelo's] house", and came to symbolize a transition in Consuelo's domestic autonomy, even as the marriage itself was deteriorating.

As the breakdown of the Duke and Duchess of Marlborough's marriage became increasingly public, it became known that the couple had signed a deed of separation on 23 October 1906. Under the terms of the agreement, Consuelo retained ownership of Sunderland House, which became her main residence in the United Kingdom. Despite the standing rule that separated or divorced couples could not be received at court, Consuelo noted that "London society would not be so governed." In the year following their separation, she stood with her father at the head of the staircase to welcome a steady flow of guests at a concert she hosted at Sunderland House.

Following her separation from the Duke, Sunderland House also emerged as a center of Consuelo's budding social activism. In November 1913, she hosted a conference at Sunderland House to advocate for improved conditions for female industrial workers.

==== First World War ====
After the outbreak of the First World War in 1914, Consuelo allowed Sunderland House to be used for charitable events and fundraising activities supporting the war effort. In 1916, the composition of the household staff attracted attention due to wartime shortages of male servants. Reports described the Duchess being driven by a female chauffeuse along Curzon Street, while a "smart-looking young woman" in overalls and trousers took on duties traditionally performed by male footmen, such as sweeping marble steps and polishing front door handles.

Consuelo records that during 1915 it became "fashionable to offer one's London house to the War Office as a nursing home." As Sunderland House was not adapted for this purpose, it was the only large house left free for public meetings. During 1916 and 1917, the mansion's cellars and strong rooms were among several in London opened to the public for shelter during Zeppelin air raids. The Duchess was credited as one of the early advocates for this practice among aristocratic homeowners. Consuelo received several letters from neighbors living in small, old, rather frail houses, thanking her for saving their lives by allowing them to seek refuge in the basement of Sunderland House; however, Consuelo ordered her maid not to wake her during raids, stating that if she were to be "blown up", she thought it better not to anticipate it.

The house was reportedly uncomfortable to live in during the war; owing to wartime restrictions there was no central heating, and Consuelo lived in a flat on the third floor, working in a small sitting room where she took meals on a tray and depended on sunlight and a small coal fire for heat. Consuelo received some criticism for occupying so large a house during the war, and stated that she only continued to occupy Sunderland House to lend the long gallery to the charities and meetings she regularly supported and sometimes chaired. Servants were increasingly hard to find, and upon receiving the resignation of a tenth housemaid, Consuelo was informed by the maid that "I thought I had come to a private house, but I find it's the town hall, and I'm sick of washing that marble floor after those meetings and refreshments."

In early 1918, the Office of Works took possession of Sunderland House for use by the Interallied War Council, with occupation lasting until mid‑1919.

==== League of Nations ====
In April 1919, the newly formed League of Nations leased the property for use as its first London headquarters, including establishment of its initial library. The secretariat of the League was based at Sunderland House until November 1920; following their departure the property was returned to Consuelo.

==== Departure ====
Consuelo did not resume residence at Sunderland House after the building was vacated by the League of Nations; in June 1919 she had leased a smaller London residence at No. 1 Portman Square, which she subsequently gifted to her eldest son John Spencer-Churchill, Marquess of Blandford when he married The Hon. Mary Cadogan in February 1920. None of Consuelo's descendants resided at Sunderland House after the War; her son continued to maintain a London residence at No. 1 Portman Square until 1927, when he leased No. 27 Hill Street, Mayfair from the Grosvenor Estate. Following Lord Blandford's succession as the 10th Duke of Marlborough in 1934, he sold the lease of 27 Hill Street in 1936 and purchased the Crown Lease of No. 11 Kensington Palace Gardens. This remained as the 10th Duke's London residence until it was requisitioned by the British Army during the Second World War; following the conclusion of the war, the 10th Duke sold his lease of 11 Kensington Palace Gardens to the French Government, who have subsequently maintained the property as the Official Residence of the French Ambassador to the United Kingdom since the late 1940s until the present day.

===== Attempts at sale =====
Surviving newspaper reports from the Daily Mail suggest that Consuelo was seeking to sell Sunderland House for £250,000 in November 1921.

The property was offered for sale in October 1927. In late 1929, it was reported that the Soviet government was seriously considering acquiring Sunderland House as its new London embassy. The estate agents, Messrs John D. Wood & Co., stated that the property was in excellent repair and had been inspected on multiple occasions by Soviet officials.

In July 1930, the property was again advertised for sale, described as:

"SUNDERLAND HOUSE, CURZON‐STREET, MAYFAIR. TO BE SOLD, FREEHOLD. This superb mansion, occupying an island site with an area of about 6,000 ft². The interior is exceedingly beautiful and comprises seven stately reception rooms—some entirely of marble—32 bedrooms, six bathrooms, central heating, passenger and service lifts, and three staircases. The property is eminently suitable for an embassy, club, institute, insurance company, bank, or any important business house. Sole agents: JOHN D. WOOD & CO., 6 Mount Street, W.1."

The house was eventually put to auction by John D. Wood & Co. on 16 November 1932 at their estate room in Berkeley Square. Bidding failed to exceed £77,000, and the property was left unsold.

Newspaper advertisements leading up to the auction offered the following description:

"SUNDERLAND HOUSE, CURZON STREET, MAYFAIR, LONDON. A superb mansion erected some years since by the Duke of Marlborough, from designs by the eminent architects Romaine‑Walker. Occupying an island site of approximately 6,000 ft², the Portland stone elevation is in the French Renaissance style. The interior is exceedingly beautiful, with seven stately reception rooms (some entirely of marble), 32 bedrooms with panelling in various styles, six bathrooms, central heating, and passenger and service lifts. There are three staircases. Eminently suitable for an embassy, club, institute, insurance company, bank, or other major enterprise. Freehold. For sale by auction (unless sold previously by private treaty). Auction offices: 2 Berkeley Square, London, W.1."

=== Commercial use ===
In December 1930, the Evening Standard reported that Sunderland House remained in the ownership of the Marlborough family, although it was on the market for a reported £150,000. The article also noted that permission had been obtained for its use as commercial premises.

==== 1933–1936: Function venue ====
By March 1933, the property had reportedly stood vacant for several years. Mr. Arundel Clarke of Bruton Street secured a lease with the option to purchase and proposed a scheme to convert the upper floors into flats. The grand reception rooms were intended to remain in use for public events such as dinners, art exhibitions, balls, and wedding receptions. Approximately twelve residential flats were to be offered, ranging in size from single-room units to six-room suites, with annual rents between £225 and £600.

Throughout the early to mid‑1930s, the house became a popular venue for debutante dances, serving as an alternative to high‑end London hotels for "coming out" balls.

==== 1936–1947: Mabie, Todd & Co Ltd and Blitz damage ====
On 24 March 1936, a sale of the contents of Sunderland House at clearance prices was held by Arundel Clarke. Newspaper reports soon followed in late April 1936 that the house had been sold and would be converted into commercial offices. By October 1936, Sunderland House was the London headquarters of British‑American writing‑instrument manufacturer Mabie, Todd & Co. Ltd.

During the Second World War the building's interior was severely damaged by incendiary bombs, with only the external masonry surviving the War. In February 1946, it was reported that the property—by then significantly damaged by wartime bombing—was being offered for sale on behalf of Mabie, Todd by the agents Collins and Collins of Brook Street.

Ownership of the house changed hands multiple times during 1946 to 1947, with the house first being sold by Mabie, Todd to Colin Grey & Co on behalf of Clifford Denbigh & Co for £170,000, and then resold to an investment company for £180,000. Owing to the significant bombing damage the building had sustained during the Blitz, newspapers reported that the primary value of the building was the site upon which it was built.

==== 1947–1956: Mond Nickel Company ====
By April 1948, newspaper reports indicated that Sunderland House was set to be converted into office space once again. The first postwar tenant was the Mond Nickel Company, which had previously occupied Grosvenor House. The building, then a shell following fire damage sustained during the Blitz, was leased for an annual rent of approximately £20,000 and was by this time under the ownership of an investment company.

In 1955, the property was again advertised for sale, this time by agents Knight, Frank & Rutley, as a "Magnificent Office Building".

By 1963, only three of Curzon Street's former aristocratic mansions remained: Crewe House, Sunderland House, and Curzon House. The latter two had both been converted into offices.

==== 1956–1997: Lombard Bank ====
Ernest Spater, president of Lombard Banking Ltd, was reported to have taken over Sunderland House in November 1956, and the building became the bank's headquarters in the United Kingdom. The building continued to serve as the premises of the Lombard Bank (a subsidiary of NatWest Bank from 1970) until the mid-1990s. By 1989, the building, then attributed with the address 38a Curzon Street London W1, functioned as the company's deposit center for London's West End district.

=== Reconversion to private residence ===
In 1997, Sheikh Mohammed bin Khalifa Al Thani of the Qatari royal family, and then Deputy Prime Minister of Qatar, reportedly purchased Lombard House for £14 million. In May 1998, planning applications were submitted to convert the property from a bank back into a private family residence.

Reports from 2004 indicated that a further £20 million was spent on refurbishments and restoration work in the early 2000s.

== Design ==
The mansion, designed in the French Renaissance style, rises four stories above a basement and dormered mansard roof. Constructed in Portland stone, the symmetrical five‑bay façade features deeply channeled rustication at ground level, a corniced architrave doorway, and segmental‑arched windows with mascaron keystones. A strong modillion cornice caps the elevation, and a dormered mansard roof completes the composition. Inside, the building retains original features including a grand stone stair with wrought‑iron balustrades, a timber‑paneled lift tower, and ornamental plasterwork.

In 1987, the building was granted Grade II listed status by English Heritage in recognition of its architectural and historical significance. The listing attributes the design of the house to C.W. Stephens, while Consuelo attributed the design to the French architect and landscape designer Achille Duchêne.
