= Spencer House, Westminster =

Grade I listed historic house museum

Coordinates: 51°30′19″N 0°8′24″W

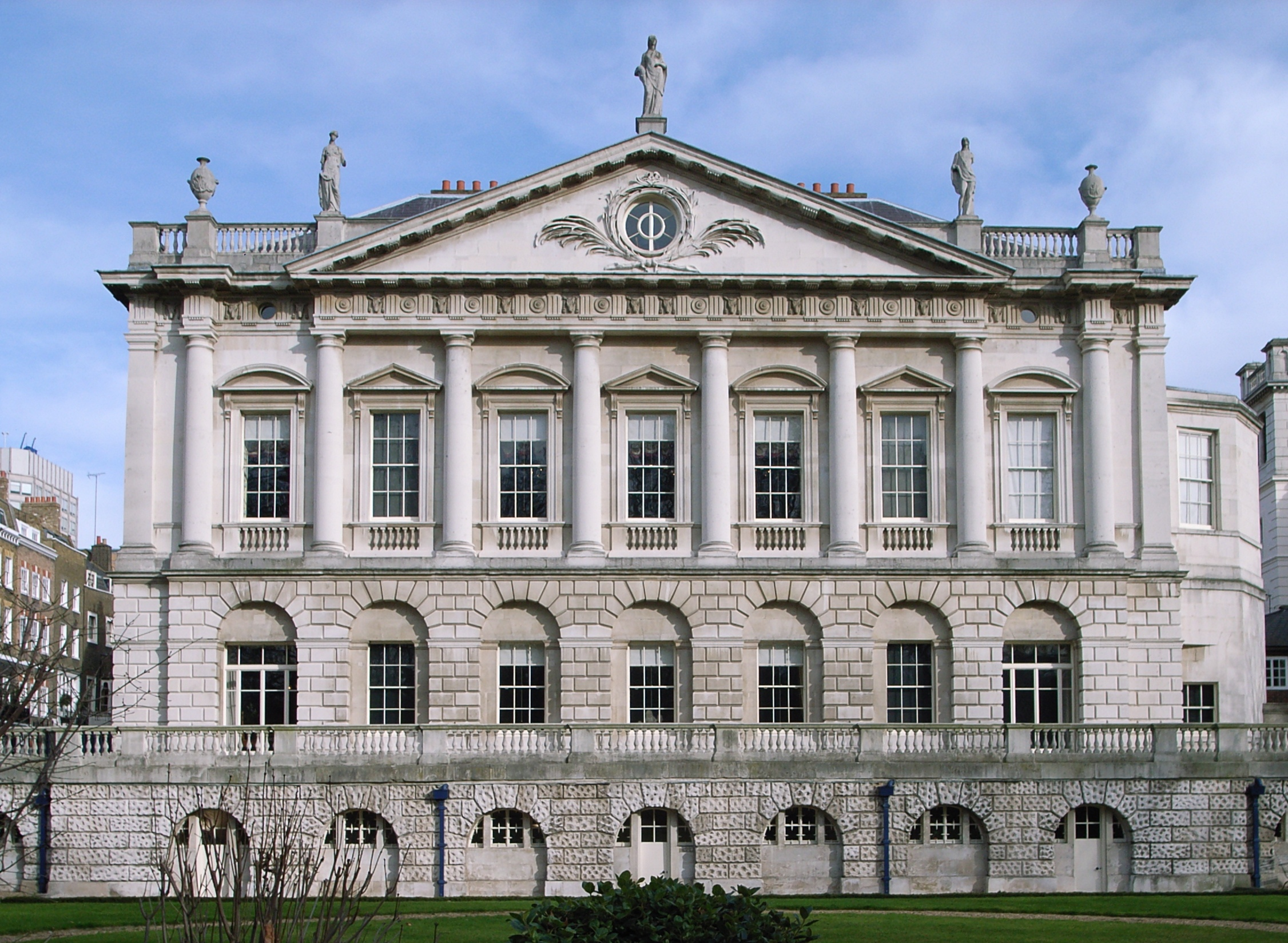
The west side of Spencer House, which overlooks Green Park

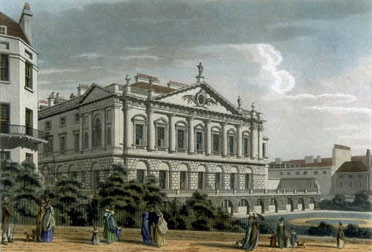
View of the house, circa 1800

Spencer House is a historic town house at 27 St James's Place in the St James's area of Westminster, Greater London, England. The house is Grade I listed on the National Heritage List for England.

== Construction and early history ==
The house was commissioned in 1756 by John Spencer (who later became the first Earl Spencer), as he required a large townhouse in London to augment his position and status. The architect he chose was John Vardy, who had studied under William Kent. Vardy is responsible for the facades of the mansion that we see today.

In 1758, James "Athenian" Stuart, who had studied the arcadian values of Ancient Greek architecture, replaced Vardy as the architect of the project. As a direct result of this, Spencer House was to have authentic Greek details in the internal decoration, and thus it became one of the first examples in London of the neoclassical style, which was to sweep the country.

As the home of successive Earls and Countesses Spencer, the staterooms of the house became a theatre for the pageant that was London high society. Members of the Spencer family occupied the mansion continuously until 1895, when the house was let out.

=== Dower House: No. 28 St James's Place ===
Adjoining Spencer House is a smaller terraced house at No. 28 St James's Place; this was originally constructed as a Dower House for Spencer House, and occasionally used by the Earls Spencer as their London House during the late 19th and early 20th century during periods when Spencer House had been let to tenants.

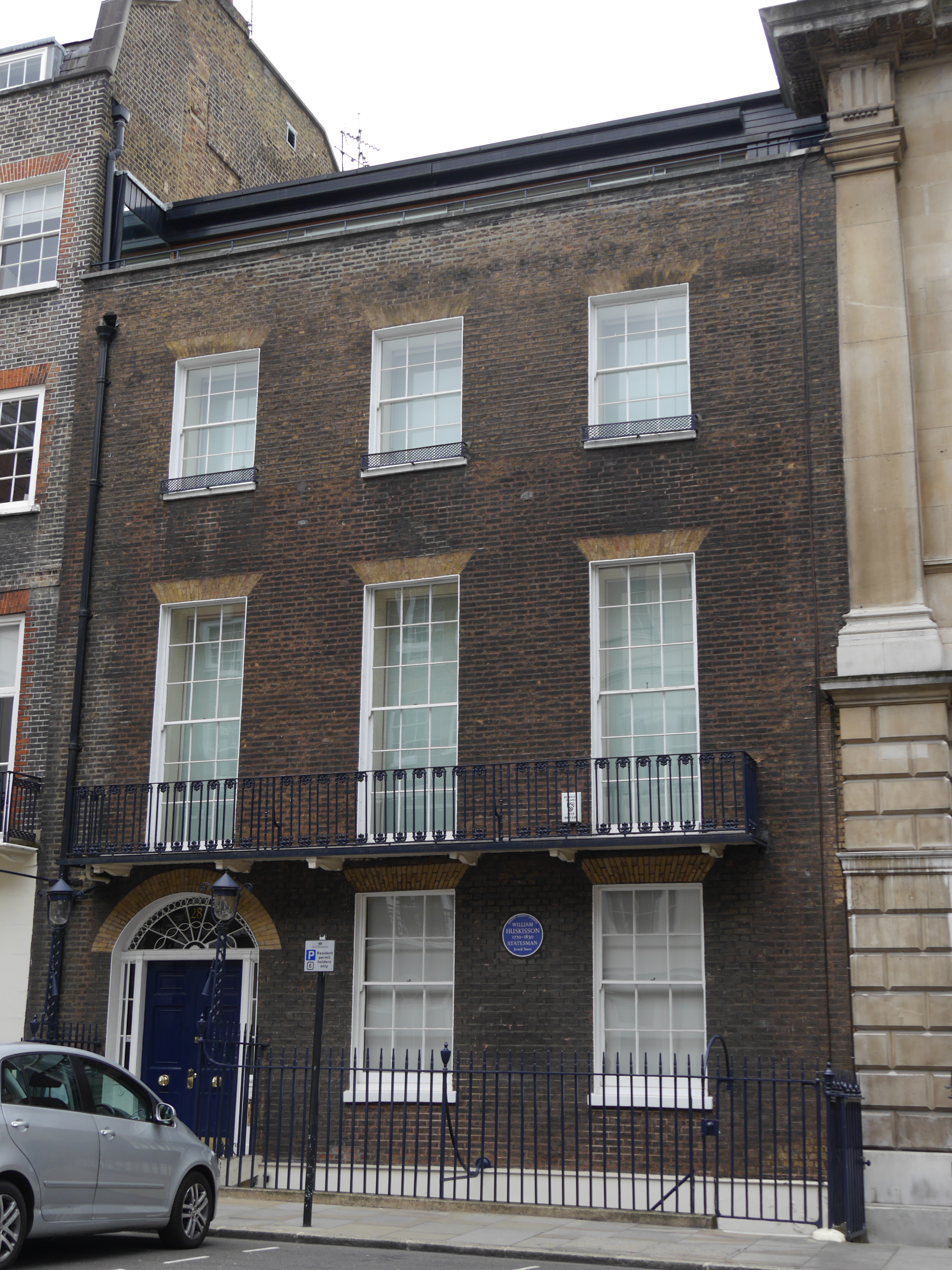
No. 28 St James's Place, London, constructed as a Dower House for Spencer House

== Occupants ==
=== 1890 to 1914 ===
In 1890 John Spencer, 5th Earl Spencer leased Spencer House to Sarah Roberts (widow of Marshall Owen Roberts) for the London Season for £2,500. During the 1890s the House was rented by self-made millionaire Barney Barnato at a cost of £2,000 annually. Lord Spencer resumed his occupation of the house in January 1897, although the Vanderbilt heiress Consuelo, Duchess of Marlborough and her first husband Charles Spencer-Churchill, 9th Duke of Marlborough leased Spencer House later in the same year. The Marlborough's first child, John Spencer-Churchill, Marquess of Blandford, was born at Spencer House on 18 September; Consuelo felt this was a fitting place for the birth, noting that the Spencer-Churchills were descendants of the Spencer family.

In 1901 the House was leased to Mary Wilson Goelet and her daughter Mary Goelet for the London Season. Mary Goelet would later go on to marry Henry Innes-Ker, 8th Duke of Roxburghe in 1903. The Spencer family were again in residence in 1903; the 5th Earl's wife Charlotte Spencer, Countess Spencer was in poor health by September of the same year, and King Edward VII, Queen Alexandra, Princess Victoria, and Princess Maud visited Spencer House on Sunday 6 September to inquire about the Countess' health. Lady Spencer died at Spencer House later that year on 30 October.

The 5th Earl Spencer died in 1910, and Spencer House was again leased in the early 1910s to Maurice de Forest, until Charles Spencer, 6th Earl Spencer resumed possession of the House in late 1914.

=== First World War: 1914 - 1918 ===
In December 1916 Lord Spencer offered the use of Spencer House to the British Government in aid of the war effort; it was reportedly the last of London's great houses to be offered for such a purpose. Lord Spencer did not charge any rent whilst the house was used during the war, and Spencer House subsequently housed the offices of the Royal Commissions on Defence of the Realm Losses and Defence of the Realm Licensed Trade Claims (South Division), as well as the Board of Referees (Finance (No. 2) Act 1915) from 1 January 1917 until early 1919.

=== Tenants: 1919 to 1926 ===
By August 1919 Spencer House had been leased to the wealthy American widow Mrs William Bateman Leeds; the continued interest and attempts to enter the building by members of the public eventually compelled Mrs Leeds to place a large sign on the front door stating "This is the private residence of Mrs. W. B. Leeds. The D. O. R. A. have gone away and no one connected with them is here now."

==== Residence of the Greek-royal-family-in-exile ====
Mrs Leeds soon remarried in January 1920; her new husband was Prince Christopher of Greece and Denmark, the youngest brother of King Constantine I of Greece.

Despite her non-royal background, Prince Christopher's new wife was accepted as a member of the Greek royal family, and following the marriage she was known as Princess Anastasia of Greece. At the time of the marriage, most of the extended Greek royal family were living in exile (King Constantine I had been forced to abdicate in 1917 in favour of his second son, King Alexander of Greece). Princess Anastasia's extensive wealth, as well as Prince Christopher's relatively low position in the line of succession to the Greek throne were widely regarded as reasons why the marriage of Prince Christopher to a non-royal American was accepted by his family.

In December 1922 Spencer House also became the temporary home of Prince Christopher's recently-exiled brother Prince Andrew of Greece and Denmark, Andrew's wife Princess Alice of Battenberg, and their infant son Prince Philip of Greece.

Princess Anastasia died at Spencer House in August 1923, and the property was subsequently leased for the 1924 London Season by Cornelius Vanderbilt III and his wife Grace Vanderbilt. Mrs Harry Brown of Pittsburg leased Spencer House for the London Season during 1925.

==== Final departure of the Spencer Family ====
In October 1921, Charles Spencer, 6th Earl Spencer publicly announced that he had become so impoverished from the burden of high taxation that he would close his country seat Althorp House, Northamptonshire for an indefinite period, and instead reside mostly at one of the Spencer's secondary town residences, No. 28 St James's Place.

Following the death of the 6th Earl Spencer in 1922, the Spencer family vacated Spencer House for the final time during the early 1920s. The 6th Earl's estate had been valued at £1,197,326 for probate, and was burdened with significant estates taxes amounting to approximately £359,197. He was succeeded by his oldest son Albert Spencer, 7th Earl Spencer; Albert's grandson Charles Spencer, 9th Earl Spencer, who is the current owner of the freehold, credits his grandfather with retaining ownership of the House during the 1920s and 30s, despite many of his aristocratic contemporaries disposing of their ancestral London townhouses. The 7th Earl Spencer held a final dinner party at the house during the early 1920s before it was let out again to a series of tenants. Although he privately accepted that he could no longer maintain the cost of running the house, the 7th Earl opposed any proposals to sell the freehold of Spencer House.

=== Clubhouse and offices: 1927 to 1985 ===
The House became the leased premises of the Ladies Army and Navy Club in early 1927. The Club continued to use Spencer House during the interwar period, before being requisitioned for Government use during the Second World War.

By 1943 it was reported that the House had sustained some damage during the Blitz, and there was some speculation that the Royal Society intended to take over the building. This speculation was later corroborated by the 9th Earl Spencer, who stated that his grandfather's determination to keep the House within the Spencer family's ownership wavered only once, when he gave serious consideration to an offer from both the Bath Club and Royal Society to acquire Spencer House for £250,000 during the 1940s. Queen Mary privately encouraged Lord Spencer to accept the offer.

In 1948 the House was leased to Christie's auctioneers for an annual rent of £5,500. In 1956 the British Oxygen Company acquired a 42-year lease of the property, which they later sold to Capital and Counties Property Co in 1961. In 1963 Spencer House was leased by the Economist Intelligence Unit.

=== Restoration: 1985–1990 ===
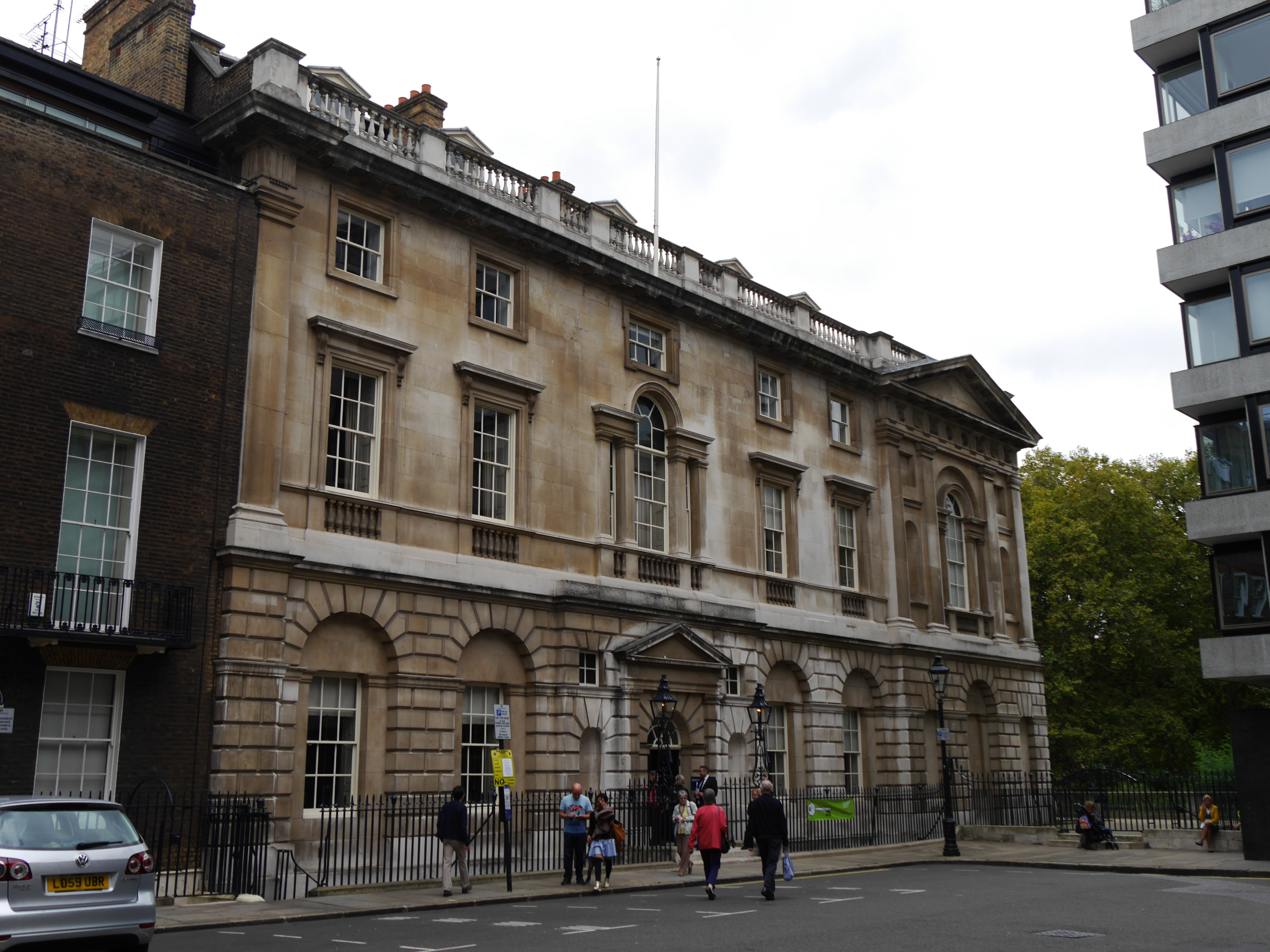
The north side of Spencer House, with the front door on St James's Place

Spencer House remains in the ownership of the Earls Spencer, the current freeholder being Charles Spencer, 9th Earl Spencer, brother of Diana, Princess of Wales.

In 1985 RIT Capital Partners, the family company of Jacob Rothschild, 4th Baron Rothschild, secured a 96-year lease (with an additional 24-year option) with an annual rent of £85,000. Lord Rothschild and The Rothschild Investment Trust reportedly spent £16 million restoring the House and grounds to their original appearance during the late 1980s.

== Recent history and usage ==
The five-year restoration of Spencer House by Lord Rothschild culminated in a 500-person reception held on 19 November 1990 to celebrate the completion of the project; amongst the guests at the reception was the then-owner of the freehold's daughter Diana, Princess of Wales. The house reportedly was made available for private entertaining, with the cost of renting the building for a banquet being cited as £10,000 (exclusive of catering). The house had also reportedly already been used as a venue for the 50th birthday celebrations of King Constantine II of Greece, as well as a lunch which Prime Minister Margaret Thatcher hosted for George H. W. Bush.

In November 1998 the House was used for a private party to celebrate the 50th birthday of Charles, Prince of Wales hosted by Andrew Cavendish, 11th Duke of Devonshire, Deborah Cavendish, Duchess of Devonshire and Lord Rothschild.

The 2017 annual report of RIT Capital Partners noted that RIT holds Spencer House on a long lease from the Spencer Trustees that requires trustee consent for any assignment or sale, limits event frequency, reserves de minimis trustee use of the “fine rooms,” obliges external redecoration every three years and internal every seven, and mandates Sunday public opening (except August).

Together with Lancaster House, Bridgewater House, Dudley House, Lombard House (formerly Sunderland House) and Apsley House, Spencer House is one of the last of the many aristocratic townhouses which once adorned central London.

== Bibliography ==
- Stourton, James (2012). Great Houses of London. London: Frances Lincoln. ISBN 978-0-7112-3366-9.
