= Sarah Churchill =

Sarah Churchill may refer to:

- Sarah Churchill, Duchess of Marlborough (1660–1744), wife of John Churchill, Queen Anne's agent
- Lady Sarah Wilson (née Spencer-Churchill; 1865–1929), war correspondent
- Sarah Churchill (actress) (1914–1982), British actress
- Lady Sarah Spencer-Churchill (1921–2000), daughter of the 10th Duke of Marlborough
