= Lady Henrietta Spencer-Churchill =

English interior designer and writer

- Born: 7 October 1958 (age 67)
- Occupation: Interior designer
- Spouse: Nathan Gelber (m. 1980; div. 1989)
- Children: 2
- Father: John Spencer-Churchill
- Relatives: James Spencer-Churchill (brother); John Spencer-Churchill (grandfather); Michael Hornby (grandfather)

Lady Henrietta Mary Spencer-Churchill (born 7 October 1958) is an English interior decorator and founder of Woodstock Designs.

== Biography ==
Lady Henrietta is the youngest child and only daughter of the 11th Duke of Marlborough by his first wife Susan Mary, daughter of Michael Hornby. She is the great-granddaughter of Consuelo Vanderbilt and the step-sister of Christina Onassis through her father's second marriage to Tina Onassis, former wife of Aristotle Onassis.

Her name has been more than once included in a list of 100 Leading Interior Designers by House & Garden magazine. She is the author of several books on the subject, as well as Blenheim and the Churchill Family: A Personal Portrait (2005), an historical and anecdotal account of her family home, Blenheim Palace.

She was married to German banker Nathan Gelber from 1980 to 1989, with whom she has sons David Aba Gelber (1981 - 2025) and Maximilian Henry Gelber (born 1985).
