= Lady Rosemary Spencer-Churchill =

English aristocrat and courtier

Lady Rosemary Muir
- Born: Lady Rosemary Mildred Spencer-Churchill; 24 July 1929 (age 97); London, England
- Spouse: Charles Robert Muir (m. 1953; died 1972)
- Children: 3
- Parents: John Spencer-Churchill, 10th Duke of Marlborough (father); Mary Cadogan (mother)

Lady Rosemary Mildred Muir (née Spencer-Churchill; born 24 July 1929) is an English aristocrat who served as a maid of honour to Elizabeth II at her coronation in 1953.

== Early life and family ==
Lady Rosemary Mildred Spencer-Churchill was born on 24 July 1929 in London to John Spencer-Churchill, Marquess of Blandford, and the Hon. Alexandra Mary Cadogan. Her maternal grandfather was Henry Cadogan, Viscount Chelsea. Her paternal grandmother was Consuelo Vanderbilt. Her father inherited the Dukedom of Marlborough, becoming the tenth duke when Spencer-Churchill was five years old. She grew up at Blenheim Palace in West Oxfordshire. After her father's death in 1972 her brother John became the eleventh Duke of Marlborough.

== Coronation of Elizabeth II ==
Spencer-Churchill served as a maid of honour to Queen Elizabeth II at her coronation in Westminster Abbey on 2 June 1953. She was the eldest and highest ranking maid of honour at Elizabeth II's coronation, as the only daughter of a duke. Lady Rosemary, along with Lady Jane Vane-Tempest-Stewart rode in a carriage with Charles Tryon, 2nd Baron Tryon, the Keeper of the Privy Purse, during the procession while the other maids of honour waited at the abbey. After the coronation, Spencer-Churchill returned to Blenheim to attend an outdoor party hosted by her mother, the Duchess of Marlborough, where they roasted an ox for villagers from Woodstock.

== Personal life ==
Spencer-Churchill married Charles Robert Muir, a stockbroker, on 26 June 1953 at Christ Church Cathedral in Oxford. Queen Elizabeth the Queen Mother and Princess Margaret were among the guests at the wedding. Their first child, Alexander Pepys Muir, was born on 8 November 1954. Their second child, Simon Huntly Muir, was born on 3 July 1959. Their third child, Mary Arabella Muir, was born on 16 January 1962. Their son Alexander is a god-son of Princess Margaret. Her husband died on 24 March 1972. She resides at Orange Hill House in Binfield.

She has seven grandchildren, Jack, Rowley, Consuelo, Robin, Thomas, Caspar and Isabella.

In 2015 Spencer-Churchill was featured in the BBC Two documentary film The Last Dukes.
