= William Kissam Vanderbilt =

American businessman and horse breeder (1849–1920)

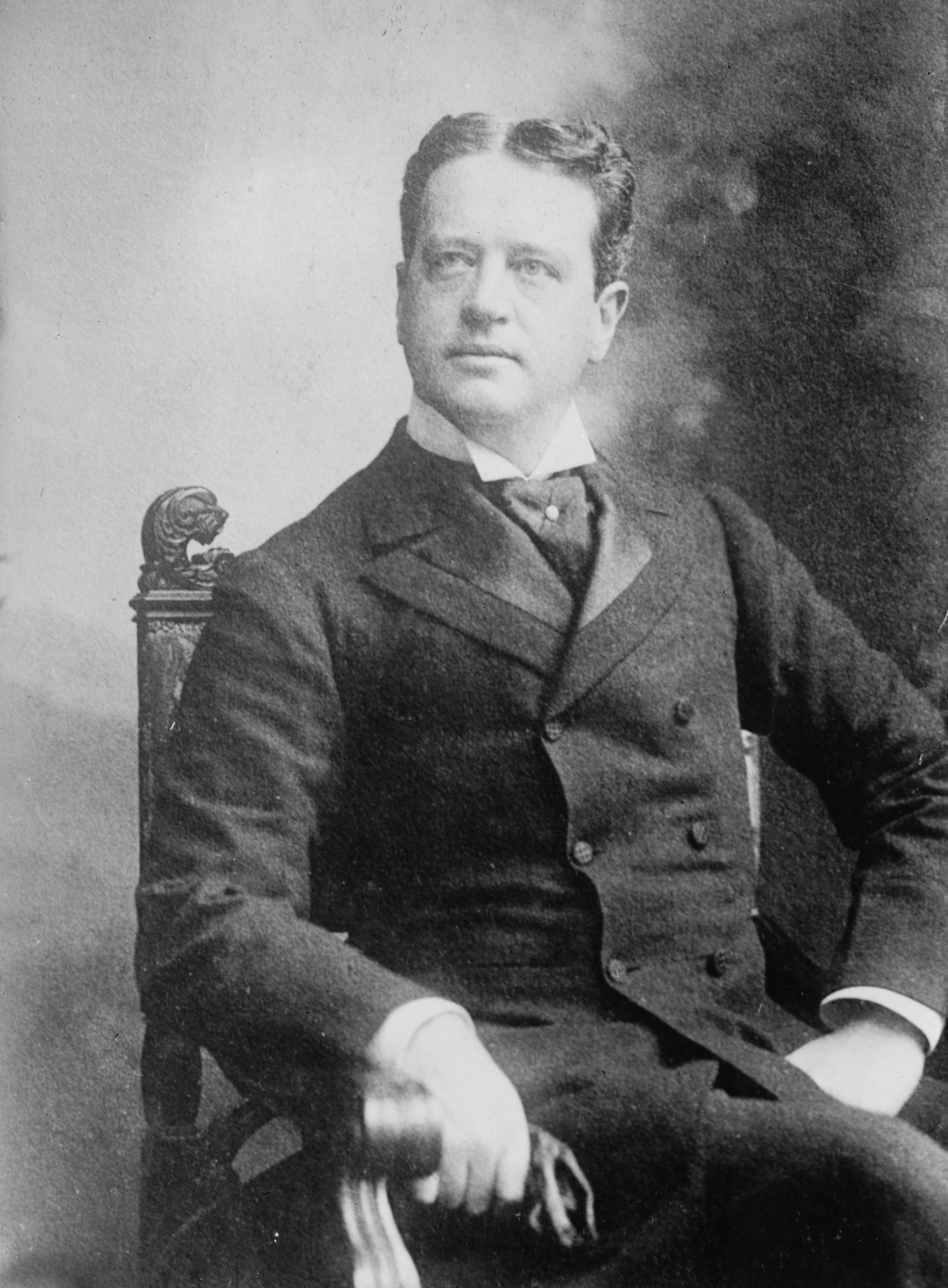
- Born: December 12, 1849; New Dorp, New York, U.S.
- Died: July 22, 1920 (aged 70); Paris, France
- Occupation: Horse breeder
- Spouses: Alva Erskine Smith (m. 1875; div. 1895) Anne Harriman Sands Rutherfurd (m. 1903)
- Children: Consuelo Spencer-Churchill, Duchess of Marlborough; William Kissam Vanderbilt II; Harold Stirling Vanderbilt
- Parent(s): William Henry Vanderbilt; Maria Louisa Kissam
- Relatives: Vanderbilt family

William Kissam Vanderbilt I (December 12, 1849 – July 22, 1920) was an American heir, businessman, philanthropist, and horse breeder. Born into the Vanderbilt family, he managed his family's railroad investments.

== Early life ==
William Kissam Vanderbilt I was born on December 12, 1849, in New Dorp, New York, on Staten Island. His parents were Maria Louisa Kissam and William Henry Vanderbilt, the eldest son of Commodore Cornelius Vanderbilt, an heir to his fortune and a prominent member of the Vanderbilt family who was the richest American after he took over his father's fortune in 1877 until his own death in 1885.

He was the third of eight children born to his parents. His siblings were Cornelius Vanderbilt II, Margaret Louisa Vanderbilt, Emily Thorn Vanderbilt, Florence Adele Vanderbilt, Frederick William Vanderbilt, Eliza Osgood Vanderbilt, and George Washington Vanderbilt II.

Vanderbilt and Mrs. Vanderbilt signed the Wallace Collection's visitors book, page 72, at Hertford House, Manchester Square, London, June 27, 1883

== Career ==
Vanderbilt inherited $55 million (equal to about $2 billion today) from his father in 1885. He managed his family railroad investments. In 1879, after taking over P. T. Barnum's Great Roman Hippodrome which was on railroad property by Madison Square Park, he renamed the facility Madison Square Garden.

=== Thoroughbred horse racing ===
Vanderbilt was one of the founders of The Jockey Club. He was a shareholder and president of the Sheepshead Bay Race Track in Brooklyn, New York, and the owner of a successful racing stable. In 1881, he built the American Horse Exchange at 50th Street (Manhattan) and Broadway. In 1911 he leased it (and eventually sold it to) the Shubert Organization who then transformed it into the Winter Garden Theatre.

After his divorce from Alva, he moved to France where he built a château and established the Haras du Quesnay horse racing stable and breeding farm near Deauville in France's famous horse region of Lower Normandy. Among the horses he owned was the U.S. Racing Hall of Fame filly Maskette, purchased from Castleton Farm in Lexington, Kentucky, for broodmare services at his French breeding farm. Vanderbilt's horses won a number of important races in France including:

- Critérium de Maisons-Laffitte: Prestige (1905), Northeast (1907), Montrose II (1911)
- Critérium de Saint-Cloud: Illinois II (1901), Marigold (1902)
- Grand Critérium: Prestige (1905), Montrose II (1911)
- Grand Prix de Deauville: Turenne (1904), Maintenon (1906)
- Grand Prix de Paris: Northeast (1908), Brumelli (1917)
- Grand Prix de Saint-Cloud: Maintenon (1906), Sea Sick (1908), Oversight (1910)
- Poule d'Essai des Poulains: McKinley (1919)
- Prix de Guiche: Negofol (1909), McKinley (1919)
- Prix de la Forêt: Prestige (1905), Montrose II (1911, dead-heat), Pétulance (1911, dead-heat)
- Prix du Jockey Club: Maintenon (1906), Sea Sick (1908), Negofol (1909), Tchad (1919)
- Prix Eugène Adam: Alpha (1903), Maintenon (1906)
- Prix Boiard: Prestige (1906), Maintenon (1907) et Tchad (1920)
- Prix Jean Prat: Prestige (1906)
- Prix Kergorlay: Turenne (1904), Maintenon (1906), Sea Sick (1909, 1910)
- Prix Lagrange: Prestige (1906)
- Prix Morny: Prestige (1905), Messidor III (1909) et Manfred (1910)
- Prix Robert Papin: Prestige (1905), Montrose II (1911), Gloster (1912)
- Prix La Rochette: Schuyler (1907), Manfred (1910), Brume (1910), Pétulance (1911)
- Prix Royal-Oak: Maintenon (1906), Reinhart (1910)

== Personal life ==
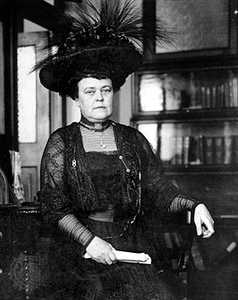
Alva Erskine Smith, first wife of William Kissam Vanderbilt

On April 20, 1875, Vanderbilt married his first wife, Alva Erskine Smith, daughter of Murray Forbes Smith and Phoebe Ann Desha. Together, they had three children:

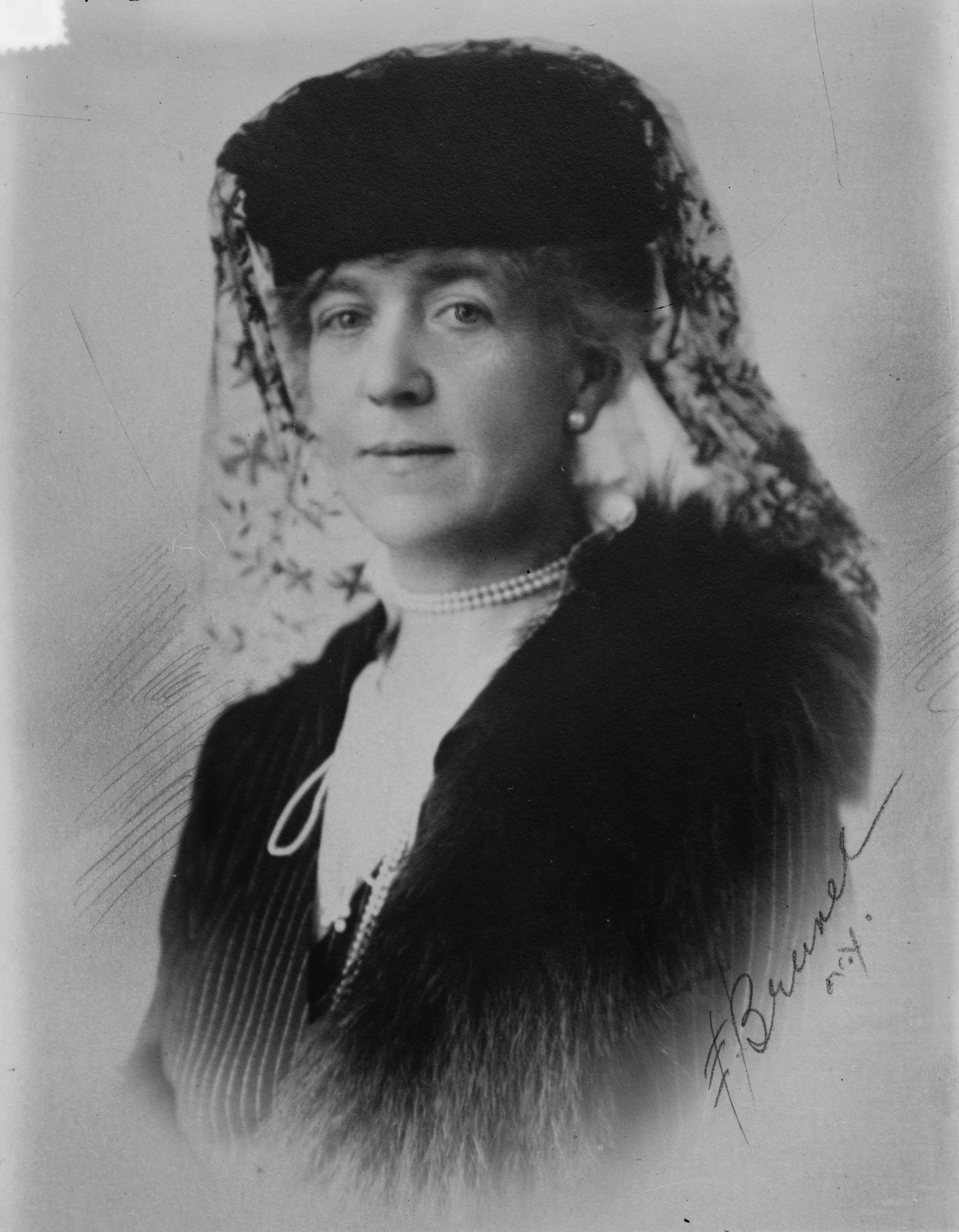
Anne (née Harriman) Sands Rutherfurd, the second wife of William Kissam Vanderbilt, ca. 1915

- Consuelo Vanderbilt (born March 2, 1877)
- William Kissam Vanderbilt II (born on October 26, 1878)
- Harold Stirling Vanderbilt (born on July 6, 1884)

Alva later coerced Consuelo into marrying Charles Spencer-Churchill, 9th Duke of Marlborough on November 6, 1895. Alva divorced Vanderbilt in March 1895, at a time when divorce was rare among the elite, and received a large financial settlement reported to be in excess of $10 million (equal to about $390 million today). The grounds for divorce were adultery, allegedly including with the Duchess of Manchester. Alva remarried to one of their old family friends, Oliver Hazard Perry Belmont, on January 11, 1896.

In 1903, Vanderbilt married Anne Harriman, daughter of banker Oliver Harriman. They had no children together. She was a widow to sportsman Samuel Stevens Sands Jr. and to Lewis Morris Rutherfurd Jr.

=== Residences ===
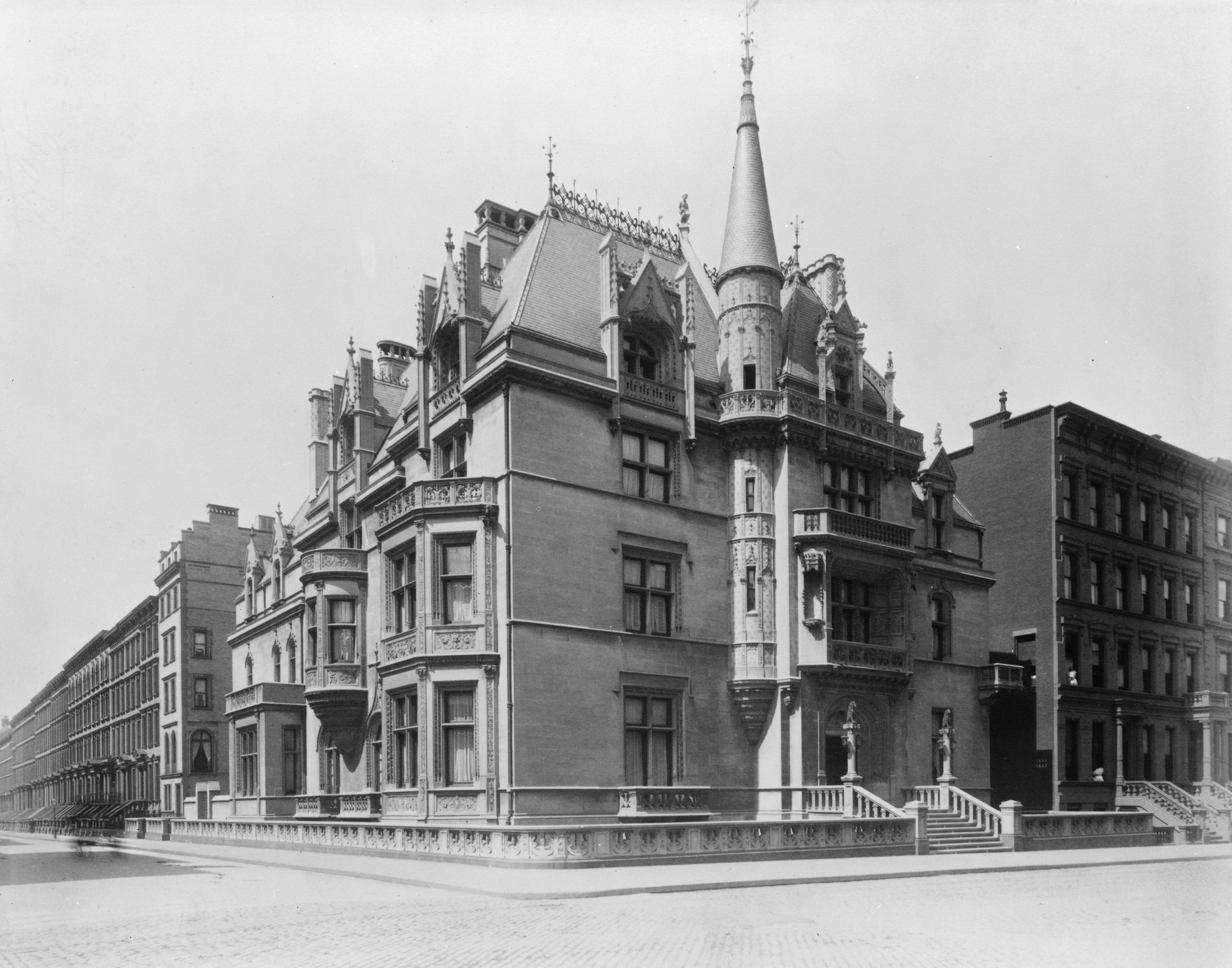
William K. Vanderbilt House on Fifth Avenue, New York City

Like other prominent Vanderbilts, he built magnificent houses. His residences included Idle Hour (1900) on Long Island and Marble House (1892), designed by Richard Morris Hunt, in Newport, Rhode Island. Hunt also designed Vanderbilt's 660 Fifth Avenue mansion (1883).

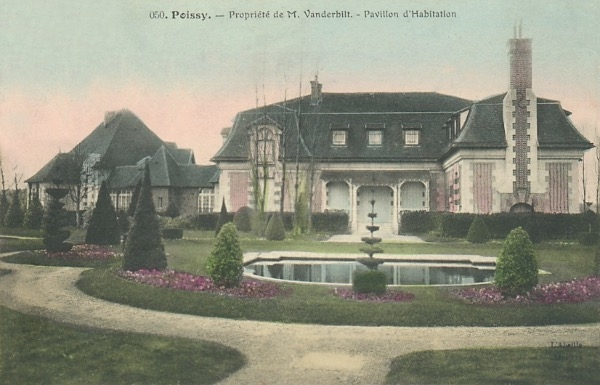
Château Vanderbilt in Carrières-sous-Poissy, France.

In 1907, Vanderbilt and his second wife built Château Vanderbilt, a Louis XIII-style manor house along with three thoroughbred race tracks in Carrières-sous-Poissy, an hour outside Paris and on the route to Deauville, famous for its horse racing.

Vanderbilt was a co-owner of the yacht Defender, which won the 1895 America's Cup and briefly owned the large steam yacht Consuelo. Vanderbilt was a founder and president of the New Theatre.

Vanderbilt made significant charitable contributions to Vanderbilt University, a private university in Nashville, Tennessee, named for his grandfather.

=== Death and legacy ===
Vanderbilt died in Paris on July 22, 1920. His remains were brought home and interred in the Vanderbilt family mausoleum in New Dorp, Staten Island, New York.

Vanderbilt's portrait, painted by F. W. Wright from an original painting by Richard Hall between 1911 and 1921, was donated to Vanderbilt University in 1921; it is hung in Kirkland Hall.

In World War II, the United States Liberty ship SS William K. Vanderbilt was named in his honor.

Vanderbilt was a founding member of the Jekyll Island Club also known as the Millionaires Club, on Jekyll Island, Georgia.

=== Estate ===
Following his death, Vanderbilt's gross estate was valued at $54,530,966.59; after deductions for debts, administrative costs, attorney’s fees, the net value of the estate was appraised at $50,222,842.23, from which $1,934,571.73 in New York State estate tax and $11,459,290.16 in federal estate tax was payable.

During his lifetime, Vanderbilt had made over $20,000,000 in financial provisions for several members of his family, including:

- $2,250,000 in New York Central Railroad Bonds placed in trust for the benefit of his second wife on 1 May 1917, which was increased to $8,250,000 in 1918;
- 15,000 shares each (valued at approximately $1.1 million each) in shares in the New York Central Railway which he transferred to his sons William K. Vanderbilt Jr and Harold S. Vanderbilt in 1918-19;
- A $5,000,000 marriage settlement for his daughter Consuelo in 1895, consisting of
  - A $2,500,000 Trust for the benefit of the 9th Duke of Marlborough and his descendants; and,
  - A $100,000 annual allowance for the benefit of Consuelo during her father's lifetime, with a covenant to pay $2,500,000 from his estate following his death.
- An additional $5,000,000 Trust fund settled on Consuelo and her descendants in 1912; and
- A further $450,000 transferred to his sons in 1919 to hold upon Trust for Consuelo and her descendants.

==== 1920: Will and estate ====
Vanderbilt's will bequeathed the bulk of his estate to his two sons; William Kissam Vanderbilt II received $21,252,757.38, and Harold Stirling Vanderbilt received $21,739,867.38.

A summary of the contents of the Will, published by the law firm Anderson & Anderson and widely reported in the press, outlined the following principal bequests:

- $250,000 to Vanderbilt University
- $50,000 to St. Mark’s Church at Islip, Long Island
- Numerous paintings and artworks to the Metropolitan Museum of Art
- A life interest in his Paris residence at 10 & 11 Rue Leroux and a château in Normandy to his widow, Anne Harriman Vanderbilt, with reversion to his daughter, Consuelo Vanderbilt
- The Idle Hour estate on Long Island to Harold
- Real property and contents at Marble House, Newport, and property on Wheatland Avenue, to whichever son succeeded to the estate from their mother Alva Belmont
- $1,000,000 in trust for his grandson William Kissam Vanderbilt III
- $100,000 each to his stepdaughters Margaret Rutherfurd Mills and Barbara Rutherfurd Hatch
- The residuary estate in equal shares to his two sons William II and Harold

Consuelo Vanderbilt, William's only daughter, was further provided for through a combination of legal settlements, testamentary trusts, and substantial inter vivos gifts. As part of her 1895 marriage settlement to Charles Spencer-Churchill, 9th Duke of Marlborough, William covenanted to pay $2,500,000 to her trustees upon his death, to provide her with an annual income of $100,000. This amount was treated as a debt against the estate and fulfilled accordingly. His will also established a separate $2,500,000 trust for her benefit, administered by her brothers, with income payable for life and the principal to vest in her children upon her death.

Surviving records from the Dane County Probate Court in Wisconsin confirm that Vanderbilt's property in the State of Wisconsin (some $2,297,000 from a total fortune of $56,091,000) was distributed in accordance with the provisions of his Will in the following proportions:

- 3.33% to Consuelo, Duchess of Marlborough
- 2.90% each to Vanderbilt's grandsons Lord Blandford and Lord Ivor Churchill
- 2.02% to his grandson William K. Vanderbilt III
- 0.51% to Vanderbilt University
- 43.9% each to his sons William K. Vanderbilt Jr and Harold S. Vanderbilt

Additional records disclosed in 1926 revealed that in 1912, William created a $5,000,000 trust using New York Central and Hudson River Railroad bonds, granting Consuelo a life interest with remainder to her sons. In 1919, he transferred a further $450,000 in liberty bonds to her brothers, instructing that they be held in trust for her benefit.

Contemporary newspaper reports speculated that, in addition to these confirmed transfers, William may have gifted a further $15,000,000 in cash and securities to Consuelo and $1,000,000 each to her sons, the Marquess of Blandford and Lord Ivor Spencer-Churchill, in the months before and after his death, although no official probate filings substantiated these claims.

She also inherited a reversionary interest in her father’s French real estate—his townhouse at 10 & 11 Rue Leroux, Paris, and a château in Normandy—following the death of her stepmother, Anne Harriman Vanderbilt; and she received one-third of the $5,000,000 trust originally created by her grandfather, William Henry Vanderbilt, which passed by default to William K. Vanderbilt’s children.

==== Transfer of wealth to Consuelo and the Churchill family ====
In total, Vanderbilt is confirmed to have settled or transferred well over $17,000,000 for the benefit of Consuelo, her husband, and their children. This included:

- The 9th Duke of Marlborough's Trust: $2,500,000 placed in trust in 1895 as part of Consuelo Vanderbilt's marriage settlement, which was to provide the 9th Duke of Marlborough with $100,000 per year for life, later payable to Consuelo if she survived him (trust created by deed prior to marriage);
- Consuelo Vanderbilt's Marriage Settlement: a covenant to pay $100,000 to Consuelo Vanderbilt annually during William Vanderbilt's lifetime, which formed part of her 1895 marriage settlement, and following his death to transfer $2,500,000 to her Trustees;
- Consuelo's 1912 Trust: a $5,000,000 trust fund created in 1912 using New York Central and Hudson River Railroad Company 3.5% Lake Shore collateral trust bonds, providing Consuelo with a life interest and remainder to her sons (inter vivos trust);
- Consuelo's 1919 Trust: $450,000 in liberty bonds conveyed to William K. Vanderbilt II and Harold S. Vanderbilt in 1919, with instructions to hold them in trust for the benefit of their sister Consuelo and her descendants;
- Sunderland House, London: approximately $2,500,000 spent between 1895 and 1902 to acquire land on Curzon Street and construct and furnish Sunderland House as a London residence for Consuelo and the Duke (real estate and capital improvement, inter vivos expenditure);
- William Henry Vanderbilt I Trust Fund: following his death in 1885, William Henry Vanderbilt I provided each of his children with a $5,000,000 Trust fund; as the Will of William Kissam Vanderbilt I did not appoint a specific beneficiary of this trust, under the terms of his father's Will the Trust was split equally between William K. Vanderbilt's children; Consuelo received a third-share amounting to $1,667,000;
- William Kissam Vanderbilt's Will: following his death in 1920, specific bequests in William K. Vanderbilt's Will included:
  - A reversionary interest to Consuelo Vanderbilt Balsan in her father’s French residences—his townhouse at 10 & 11 Rue Leroux, Paris, and a château in Normandy—subject to a life interest in these properties given to her stepmother, Anne Harriman Vanderbilt;
  - $1,000,000 each to his grandsons Lord Blandford and Lord Ivor Spencer-Churchill;
  - $900,000 in Trust for Lord Blandford and Lord Ivor.
- Lord Blandford also reportedly was gifted a London townhouse by his grandfather as a wedding gift in 1920.

In the later 20th century, following the death of Gertrude Conaway Vanderbilt (widow of Harold Stirling Vanderbilt) in 1978, a portion of her wealth was bequeathed to Consuelo’s grandchildren, including:

- $100,000 outright and a $400,000 Trust Fund Consuelo’s grandson John Spencer-Churchill, 11th Duke of Marlborough;
- A Trust Fund of $1,000,000 to Lord Charles Spencer-Churchill;
- $100,000 to Lady Sarah Roubanis;
- $200,000 to Lady Caroline Waterhouse; and,
- $200,000 to Lady Rosemary Muir.
