= Lord Ivor Spencer-Churchill =

Younger son of the 9th Duke of Marlborough (1898–1956)

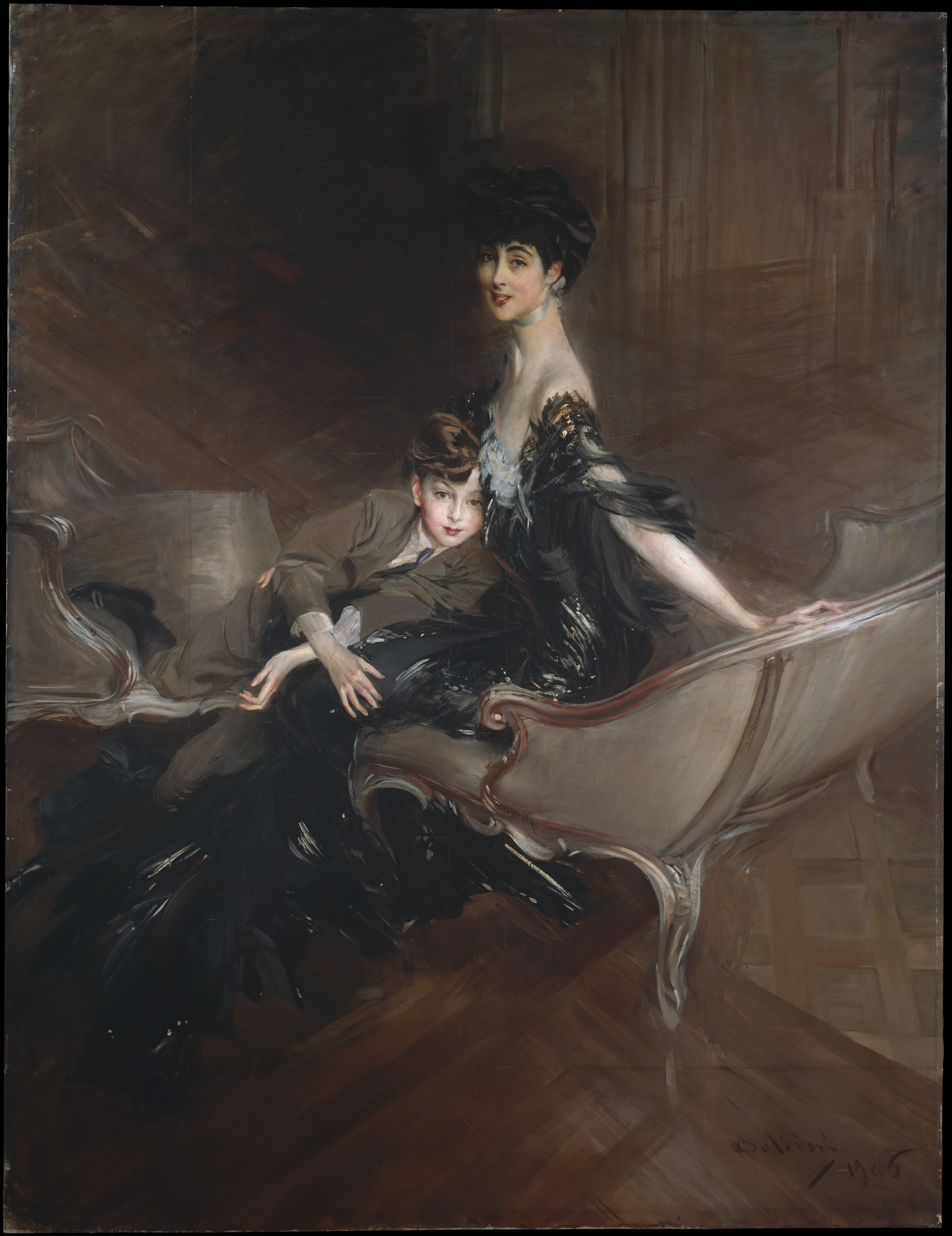
- Ivor Spencer-Churchill with his mother, by Giovanni Boldini.
- Born: Ivor Charles Spencer-Churchill; 14 October 1898; Mayfair, London
- Died: 17 September 1956 (aged 57); London
- Spouse: Elizabeth Cunningham (m. 1947)
- Children: Robert William Charles Spencer-Churchill
- Parent(s): Charles Spencer-Churchill, 9th Duke of Marlborough; Consuelo Vanderbilt
- Relatives: John Spencer-Churchill, 10th Duke of Marlborough (brother)

Lord Ivor Charles Spencer-Churchill (14 October 1898 – 17 September 1956) was a British aristocrat, soldier, and art collector. He was the younger son of the 9th Duke of Marlborough and his first wife, the former Consuelo Vanderbilt, an American railroad heiress. His elder brother John was the 10th Duke of Marlborough. His first cousin once removed was Sir Winston Churchill.

== Early life ==
Lord Ivor Charles Spencer-Churchill was born on 14 October 1898. He was the second son of the 9th Duke of Marlborough and Consuelo Vanderbilt. In 1921, his parents divorced when he was 22 years old. His father later wed the former Gladys Deacon; while his mother went on to marry Col. Jacques Balsan.

His mother was the only daughter and eldest child of William Kissam Vanderbilt, a New York railroad millionaire, and his first wife, the Mobile, Alabama-born Alva Erskine Smith (1853–1933), who later married Oliver Belmont. His mother's name was in honour of her godmother, Consuelo Yznaga (1853–1909), a half-Cuban, half-American socialite who created a social stir a year earlier when she married the fortune-hunting George Montagu, Viscount Mandeville.

Spencer-Churchill was educated at Eton College and Magdalen College, Oxford.

== Career ==
He joined the Royal Army Service Corps in 1917, gaining the rank of lieutenant. He fought in the First World War and was decorated with the French Legion of Honour.

A conveyance dated 26 September 1930 documents the purchase of three parcels of land and premises known as Springhead situated along Mill Street at Fontmell Magna in the county of Dorset. Another conveyance dated 8 November 1934 documents Lord Ivor Churchill selling one of these parcels (31 Mill Street, a semi-detached cottage) to Henry Rolf Gardener (see Rolf Gardiner).

== Personal life ==
In 1923, Lord Ivor was rumoured to have become engaged to Grace Vanderbilt, a distant cousin and the daughter of Cornelius Vanderbilt III.

On 15 November 1947, he married Elizabeth "Betty" Cunningham (1914–2010), the daughter of James Cyril Cunningham. Together, they had a son:

- Robert William Charles Spencer-Churchill (born 1954), who in 1979 married Jeanne M. Maze, daughter of Etienne Maze and granddaughter of Paul Maze, a painter and friend of Winston Churchill.

Ivor developed an inoperable brain tumour and died in September 1956. He is buried beside his cousin Sir Winston Churchill and close to his mother at St Martin's Church, Bladon, near Woodstock, Oxfordshire.

== Art collector ==
He was a famous art collector, especially interested by modern French painting, collecting paintings and organizing exhibitions like the Anglo-French Art & Travel Society's Exhibition of 19th Century French Painting (1–31 October 1936). He was in close relations with the English art dealer Percy Moore Turner.

== Ancestry ==
Ancestors of Lord Ivor Spencer-Churchill

16. George Spencer-Churchill, 6th Duke of Marlborough
8. John Spencer-Churchill, 7th Duke of Marlborough
17. Lady Jane Stewart
4. George Spencer-Churchill, 8th Duke of Marlborough
18. Charles Vane, 3rd Marquess of Londonderry
9. Lady Frances Vane
19. Lady Frances Vane-Tempest
2. Charles Spencer-Churchill, 9th Duke of Marlborough
20. James Hamilton, Viscount Hamilton
10. James Hamilton, 1st Duke of Abercorn
21. Harriet Douglas
5. Lady Albertha Hamilton
22. John Russell, 6th Duke of Bedford
11. Lady Louisa Russell
23. Lady Georgiana Gordon
1. Lord Ivor Spencer-Churchill
24. Cornelius Vanderbilt
12. William Henry Vanderbilt
25. Sophia Johnson
6. William Kissam Vanderbilt
26. Reverend Samuel Kissam
13. Maria Louisa Kissam
27. Margaret Hamilton Adams
3. Consuelo Vanderbilt
28. George Smith
14. Murray Forbes Smith
29. Delia Stirling Forbes
7. Alva Smith
30. Robert Desha
15. Phoebe Ann Desha
31. Eleanor Shelby
