= Charles Spencer-Churchill, 9th Duke of Marlborough =

British soldier and politician (1871–1934)

His Grace The Duke of Marlborough KG TD PC
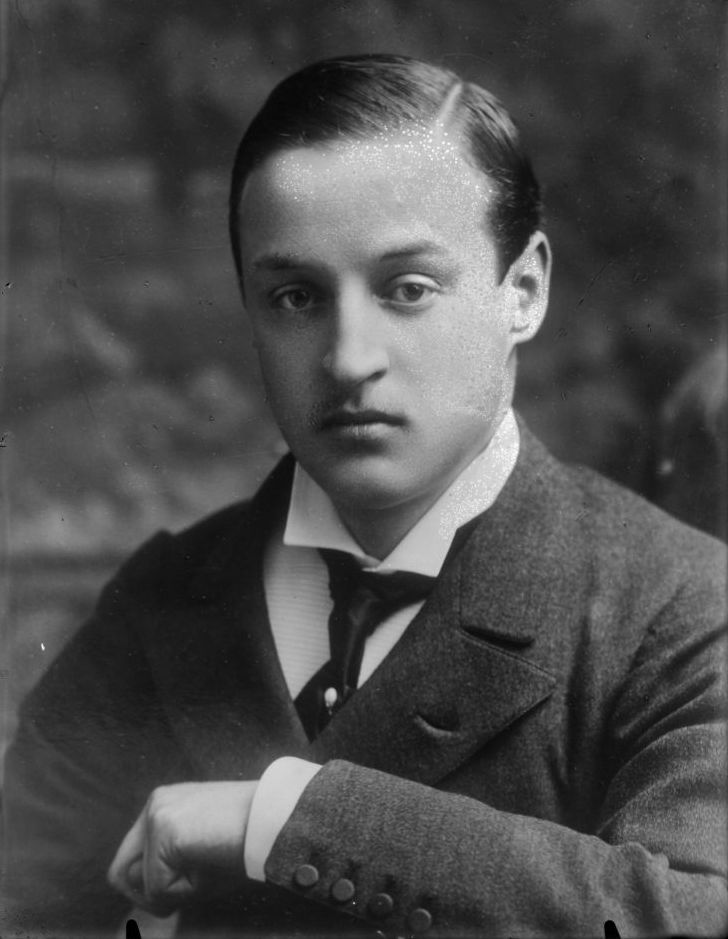
- The Duke of Marlborough in 1900

Parliamentary Secretary to the Board of Agriculture and Fisheries
- In office 1917–1918 Serving with Sir Richard Winfrey
- Prime Minister: David Lloyd George
- Preceded by: Sir Richard Winfrey
- Succeeded by: The Viscount Goschen

Under-Secretary of State for the Colonies
- In office 22 July 1903 – 4 December 1905
- Prime Minister: Arthur Balfour
- Preceded by: The Earl of Onslow
- Succeeded by: Winston Churchill

Paymaster General
- In office 1899 – 11 March 1902
- Prime Minister: The Marquess of Salisbury
- Preceded by: The Earl of Hopetoun
- Succeeded by: Sir Savile Crossley, Bt

Member of the House of Lords as Duke of Marlborough
- In office 8 November 1892 – 30 June 1934
- Preceded by: George Spencer-Churchill
- Succeeded by: John Spencer-Churchill

Personal details
- Born: Charles Richard John Spencer-Churchill; 13 November 1871 Simla, British India
- Died: 30 June 1934 (aged 62)
- Party: Conservative
- Spouses: Consuelo Vanderbilt (m. 1895; div. 1921) Gladys Deacon (m. 1921)
- Children: John Spencer-Churchill, 10th Duke of Marlborough; Lord Ivor Spencer-Churchill
- Parent(s): George Spencer-Churchill, 8th Duke of Marlborough; Lady Albertha Hamilton
- Education: Trinity College, Cambridge

Lieutenant-Colonel Charles Richard John Spencer-Churchill, 9th Duke of Marlborough (13 November 1871 – 30 June 1934), styled Earl of Sunderland until 1883 and Marquess of Blandford between 1883 and 1892, was a British soldier and Conservative politician, and a close friend of his first cousin Winston Churchill. He was often known as "Sunny" Marlborough after his courtesy title of Earl of Sunderland.

== Early life and education ==
Born at Simla, British India, Marlborough was the only son of the then Marquess of Blandford (who succeeded as the 8th Duke of Marlborough in July 1883) and Lady Albertha Hamilton, daughter of the 1st Duke of Abercorn. He was a nephew of Lord Randolph Churchill and a first cousin of Sir Winston Churchill, with whom he had a close and lifelong friendship. He was educated at Winchester College and Trinity College, Cambridge.

== Political career ==
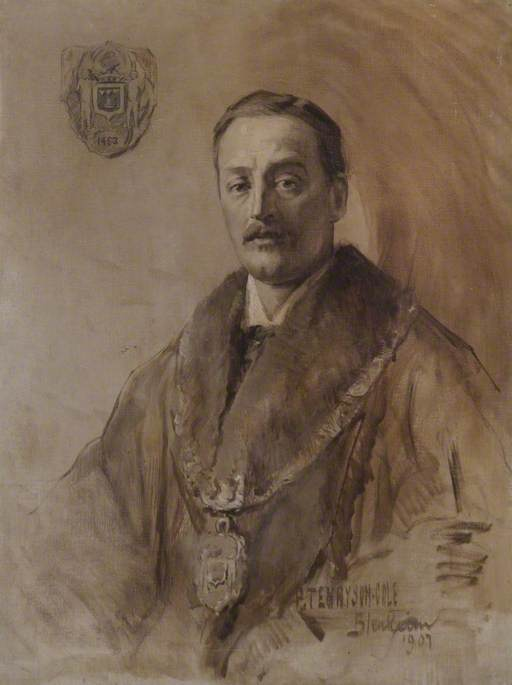
Drawing of the 9th Duke in Mayoral robes by Tennyson Cole, 1907

Marlborough entered the House of Lords on the early death of his father in 1892, and made his maiden speech in August 1895. In 1899, he was appointed Paymaster General by Lord Salisbury, a post he held until 1902. He was then Under-Secretary of State for the Colonies under Arthur Balfour between 1903 and 1905. He was sworn of the Privy Council in 1899.

He again held political office during the First World War, when he was Joint Parliamentary Secretary to the Board of Agriculture and Fisheries between 1917 and 1918 in David Lloyd George's coalition government. He made his last speech in the House of Lords in December 1931.

Shortly before the coronation of King Edward VII and Queen Alexandra, Marlborough was invested as a Knight Companion of the Order of the Garter (KG) at Buckingham Palace on 30 May 1902. He subsequently served as Lord High Steward at the coronation the following August (the coronation had originally been scheduled for June). He went to India to attend the January 1903 Delhi Durbar as a guest of the viceroy, Lord Curzon.

The Duke of Marlborough was Mayor of Woodstock between 1907 and 1909, and Lord Lieutenant of Oxfordshire from 1915 until his death.

He was President of the National Fire Brigades Union and founded the British Cotton Growers Association. He was also, after his father, a prominent member of the Ancient Order of Druids, and patron of the prestigious AOD Albion Lodge based at Oxford. On 10 August 1908, in the park of Blenheim Palace, he welcomed the ceremony of initiation of his cousin, Winston Churchill, as a Druid. In 1912, he hosted the Blenheim Unionist rally against Irish Home Rule at Blenheim Palace. In the First World War he became founder president of the Women's National Land Service Corps, the forerunner of the Women's Land Army formed later in the war.

== Military career ==
Marlborough was appointed a lieutenant in the Queen's Own Oxfordshire Hussars in 1897. After the outbreak of the Second Boer War, he was in January 1900 seconded for service as a staff captain in the Imperial Yeomanry serving in South Africa, and received the temporary rank of captain. He arrived in Cape Town in March 1900, and left for Naauwpoort in Northern Cape Colony with the Oxford company of the Imperial Yeomanry.

He was appointed to a staff position as Assistant Military Secretary to Lord Roberts, Commander-in-Chief of the British forces in South Africa, in April 1900; and was subsequently aide-de-camp to Lieutenant-General Ian Hamilton.

He was mentioned in despatches and promoted to major on 7 December 1901. After the formation of the Special Reserve he was appointed Honorary Colonel of the 3rd (Reserve) Battalion, Oxfordshire and Buckinghamshire Light Infantry in 1908.

He was promoted lieutenant-colonel of his yeomanry regiment in 1910, serving until 1914. He was awarded the Territorial Decoration (TD) in 1913. He rejoined during the First World War, when he served as a lieutenant-colonel on the General Staff in France. During a visit at the Western Front to his cousin Winston who was then serving in the trenches, both narrowly missed being killed when a piece of shrapnel (now displayed at Blenheim Palace) fell between them. He was later Honorary Colonel and commandant of the Oxfordshire Volunteer Regiment of the Volunteer Training Corps from 1918 to 1920.

== Personal life ==
=== First marriage ===
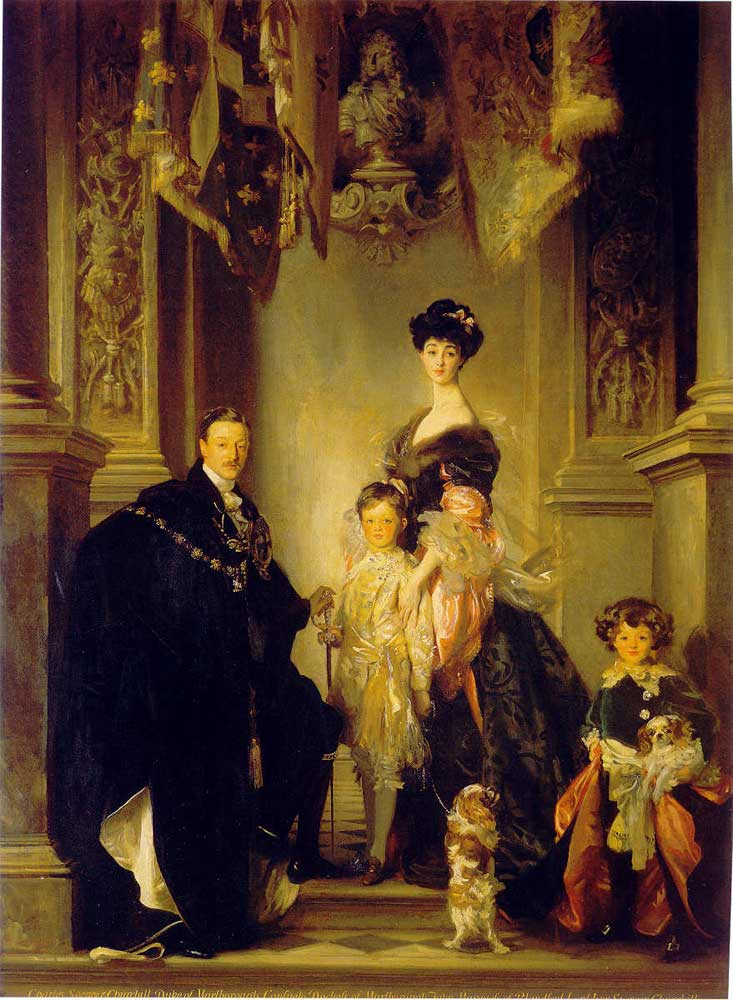
Portrait of the Spencer-Churchill family by John Singer Sargent, 1905.

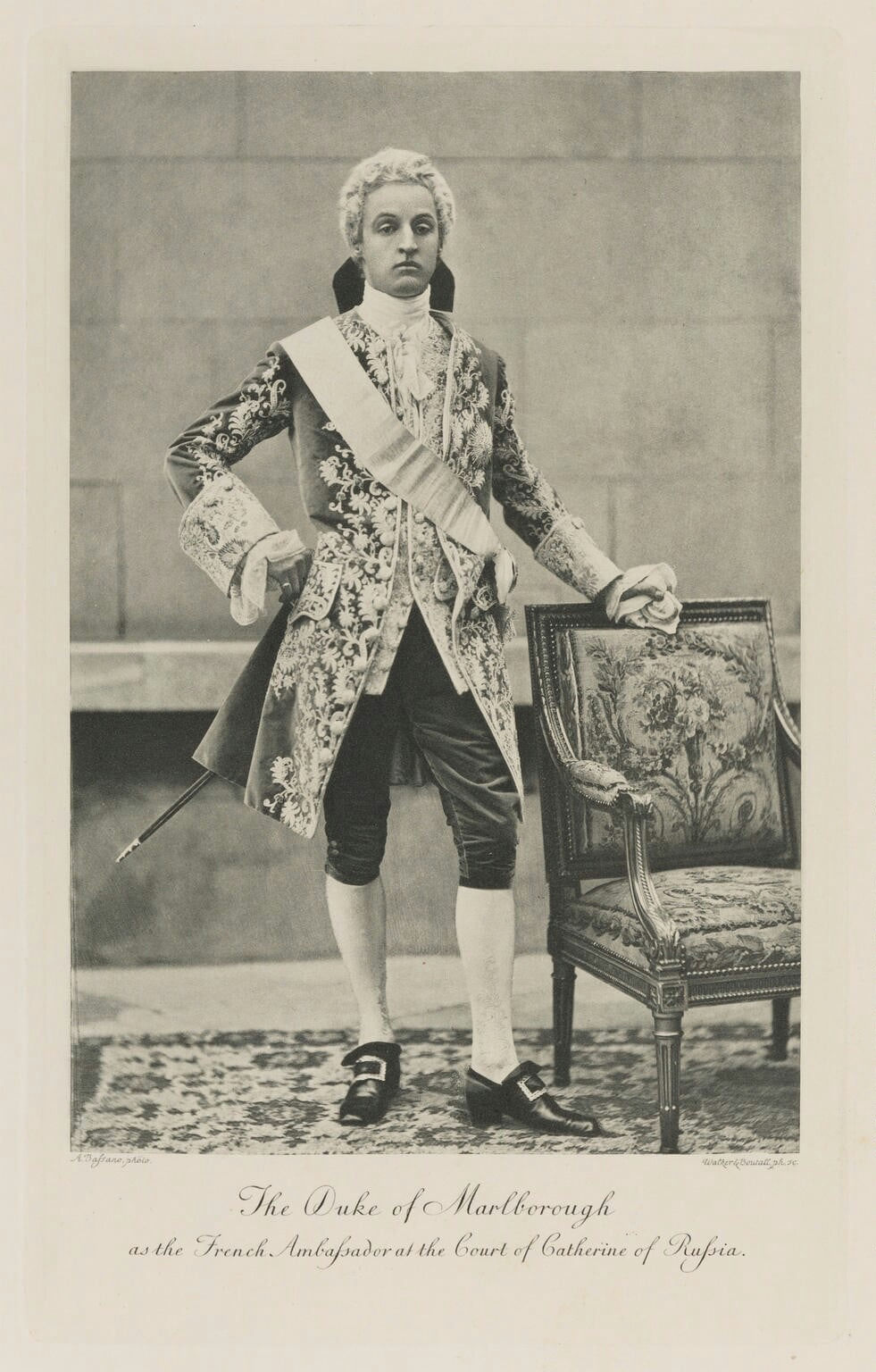
The Duke at the Devonshire House Ball of 1897, dressed as the French Ambassador to the Court of Catherine the Great.

Marlborough was married twice. His first wife was the American railroad heiress Consuelo Vanderbilt, whom he married at Saint Thomas Church in New York City on 6 November 1895. The marriage was a mercenary one. Inheriting his near-bankrupt dukedom in 1892, he was forced to find a quick and drastic solution to the financial problems of his family. Prevented by the strict social dictates of late 19th-century society from earning money, he was left with one solution; to marry money.

The marriage was celebrated following lengthy negotiations with his bride's divorced parents: her mother, Alva Vanderbilt, was desperate to see her daughter a duchess, and the bride's father, William Vanderbilt, paid for the privilege. The value of the initial marriage settlement was $5,000,000, although the Duke and his descendants continued to benefit from millions of dollars of gifts and inheritances from members of Consuelo's family throughout the 20th century.

The bride later claimed she had been locked in her room until she agreed to the marriage. The contract was actually signed in the vestry of St. Thomas Episcopal Church, immediately after the wedding vows had been made. While they honeymooned in Europe, Marlborough told Consuelo that he actually loved another woman but had married her to "save Blenheim".

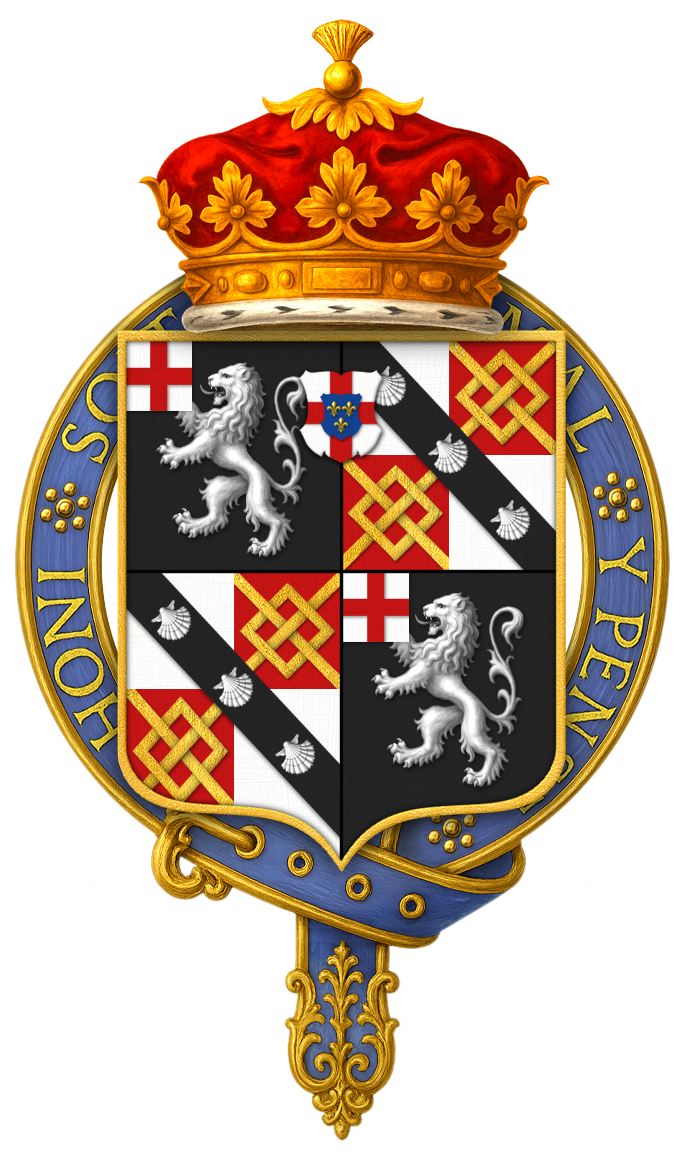
Shield of arms of Charles Spencer-Churchill, 9th Duke of Marlborough, KG, TD, PC

They had two sons, John Spencer-Churchill, Marquess of Blandford, eventually the 10th Duke of Marlborough, and Lord Ivor Spencer-Churchill. Their mother famously referred to them as "the heir and the spare".

The Vanderbilt dowry was used to restore Blenheim Palace and replenish its furnishings and library, for many of the original contents had been sold over the course of the 19th century. Many of the jewels worn by subsequent Duchesses of Marlborough also date from this period. The 9th Duke employed noted landscape gardener Achille Duchêne to create the water garden on the terrace at Blenheim. In 1934 he owned 19,685 acres of land.

=== Marriage settlement and American wealth ===
The marriage of the Duke and Consuelo resulted in a significant transfer of wealth from the Vanderbilt family to the couple and their descendants throughout the 20th century.

In 1895 the final outcome of the negotiations over the marriage settlement was that the Duke would receive a Trust fund containing 50,000 shares of capital stock of the Beech Creek Railway Company, then worth approximately $2,500,000 ($77,000,000 in 2017) with a minimum 4% dividend guaranteed by the New York Central Railroad Company. After the Duke's death the income would be paid to Consuelo for her lifetime, and thereafter to the holder of the Dukedom (provided that they were also a descendant of Consuelo and the Ninth Duke).

In addition to the Duke's trust fund, William K. Vanderbilt also signed a covenant committing him to providing his Consuelo with an annual income of $100,000 for the remainder of his lifetime; after his death the covenant provided that his Executors would settle a further $2,500,000 trust fund on Consuelo which would be treated as a debt against William K. Vanderbilt's estate.

During the period of 1895 to 1902 the Duke's father-in-law provided approximately $2,500,000 spent to acquire land on Curzon Street and construct and furnish Sunderland House as a London residence for the Duke and Duchess.

Although the couple separated in 1906, further transfers of wealth to the Duke's descendants from the Vanderbilt family included:

- The income from a $5,000,000 trust fund created by William K. Vanderbilt in 1912, which would be payable to Consuelo for life and then to her sons by the Duke;
- The income from a further $450,000 trust settled on Consuelo, and then her sons by Vanderbilt in 1919;
- A $900,000 joint trust fund and outright bequests of $1,000,000 each specified in the will of Consuelo's father for the benefit of her and the Duke's two sons;
- A series of bequests in 1978 specified under the will of Consuelo's aunt, Gertrude Conaway Vanderbilt to Consuelo and the Duke's descendants, including:
  - $100,000 outright and a $400,000 Trust Fund to John Spencer-Churchill, 11th Duke of Marlborough;
  - A Trust Fund of $1,000,000 to Lord Charles Spencer-Churchill;
  - $100,000 to Lady Sarah Roubanis;
  - $200,000 to Lady Caroline Waterhouse; and,
  - $200,000 to Lady Rosemary Muir.

=== Separation and divorce ===
Throughout their marriage Consuelo was far from happy; she recorded many of her problems in her autobiography The Glitter and the Gold. Consuelo was also unfaithful; her liaisons included her first love, Winthrop Rutherfurd (who was alleged to be the father of her second son, Lord Ivor, since he allegedly bore no resemblance to either the Duke or his brother), and three of her husband's cousins: Hon. Freddie Guest (son of Ivor Guest, 1st Baron Wimborne, and Lady Cornelia Spencer-Churchill), Hon. Reginald Fellowes (son of William Fellowes, 2nd Baron de Ramsey, and Lady Rosamund Spencer-Churchill) and Charles, Viscount Castlereagh.

The couple shocked society by separating in 1906. In order to facilitate the divorce, Alva Vanderbilt testified that she had coerced her daughter into marrying the Duke. The couple were divorced in 1921; their marriage obtained a declaration of nullity by the Catholic Church on 19 August 1926, no doubt facilitated by the Anglican Duke's wish to become a Roman Catholic. Consuelo subsequently married a Frenchman, Jacques Balsan. She died in 1964, having lived to see her son become Duke of Marlborough; she frequently returned to Blenheim, the house she had found uncomfortable and inconvenient when living there.

=== Second marriage ===
In the late 1890s, the Duke invited to Blenheim Palace Gladys Deacon, another American, who became friends with Consuelo. Deacon, the daughter of Edward Parker Deacon, became the Duke's mistress soon after moving into the palace. She and Marlborough were married on 25 June 1921 in Paris, shortly after his divorce from Consuelo.

Later in life the Duke converted to Catholicism in 1927, around which time the couple began drifting apart, and Deacon took to keeping a revolver in her bedroom to prevent her husband's entry. He moved out of the palace, and two years later evicted her. The couple separated but never divorced.

== Death ==
Marlborough died of cancer on 30 June 1934 aged 63, after barely a month's illness. His cousin Winston Churchill, who wrote an obituary tribute for him in The Times, recalled that beforehand he was still active, speaking in the House of Lords and racegoing. His personal estate in the United Kingdom was valued at £18,005 for Probate, with a further grant in respect of settled land in December 1934 valued at £118,223. A 1944 court ruling in the Chancery Division of the English High Court of Justice held that death duties on the $2,500,000 Trust which the Duke's former father-in-law had settled on Marlborough in 1895 had become payable upon the 9th Duke's death, despite the fact that the income was still being paid to Consuelo for the remainder of her lifetime under the terms of the Trust. The duties, with interest added for the period between the 9th Duke's death and 12 April 1946 were paid in 1946, and amounted to approximately £175,000.

== In popular culture ==
Marlborough was played by David Markham in the ITV drama Winston Churchill: The Wilderness Years.

Political offices
Preceded by The Earl of Hopetoun	Paymaster General; 1899–1902	Succeeded by Sir Savile Crossley, Bt
Preceded by The Earl of Onslow	Under-Secretary of State for the Colonies; 1903–1905	Succeeded by Winston Churchill
Preceded by Sir Richard Winfrey	Joint Parliamentary Secretary to the Board of Agriculture and Fisheries; 1917–1918 with Sir Richard Winfrey	Succeeded by Sir Richard Winfrey; The Viscount Goschen
Court offices
Vacant Title last held by The Earl of Halsbury	Lord High Steward; 1902	Vacant Title next held by The Duke of Northumberland
Honorary titles
Preceded by The Earl of Jersey	Lord Lieutenant of Oxfordshire; 1915–1934	Succeeded by Vivian Smith
Peerage of England
Preceded by George Spencer-Churchill	Duke of Marlborough; 1892–1934	Succeeded by John Spencer-Churchill
