= Mary Spencer-Churchill, Duchess of Marlborough =

British peeress and ATS officer (1900–1961)

Her Grace The Duchess of Marlborough CBE JP
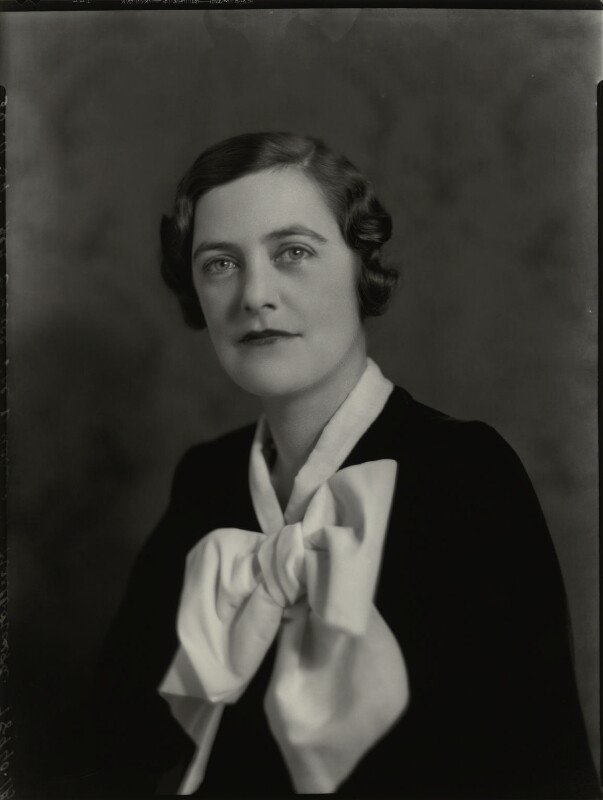
- Portrait by Bassano Ltd, 1934
- Born: Alexandra Mary Cadogan; 22 February 1900; Chelsea, London
- Died: 23 May 1961 (aged 61); Blenheim Palace, Woodstock, Oxfordshire
- Burial place: St Martin's Church, Bladon, Oxfordshire
- Spouse: John Spencer-Churchill, 10th Duke of Marlborough (m. 1920)
- Children: Lady Sarah Spencer-Churchill; Lady Caroline Waterhouse; John Spencer-Churchill, 11th Duke of Marlborough; Lady Rosemary Muir; Lord Charles Spencer-Churchill
- Parents: Henry Cadogan, Viscount Chelsea (father); Mildred Sturt (mother)

Alexandra Mary Spencer-Churchill, Duchess of Marlborough (née Cadogan; 22 February 1900 – 23 May 1961), styled Marchioness of Blandford between 1920 and 1934, was a British peeress. As the wife of the 10th Duke of Marlborough, she was châtelaine of Blenheim Palace.

She served as an officer in the Auxiliary Territorial Service during World War II and was the first female mayor of the town of Woodstock, Oxfordshire.

== Early life and family ==
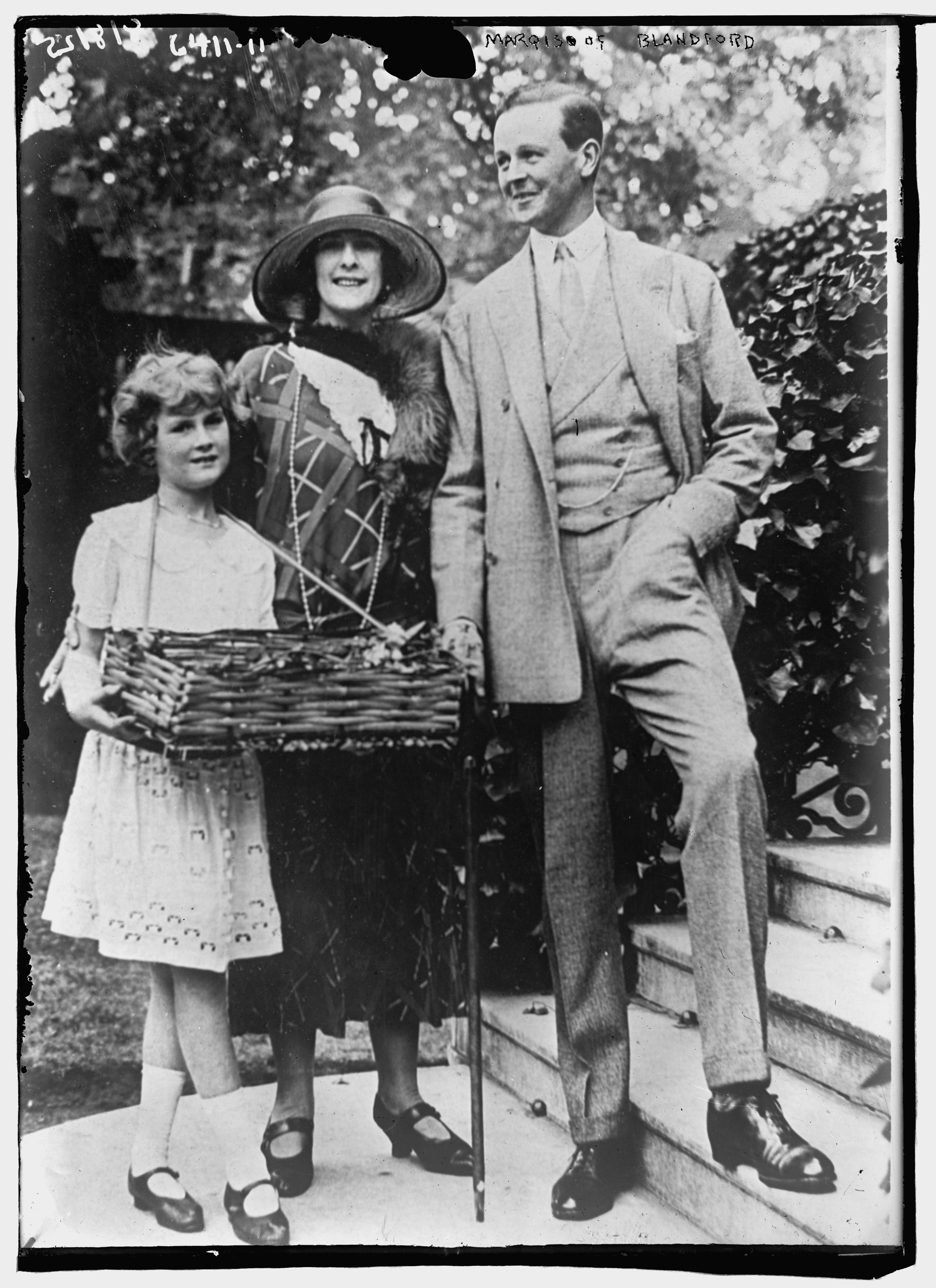
c. 1925

Mary was born in Chelsea on 22 February 1900 to Henry, Viscount Chelsea, eldest surviving son and heir of the 5th Earl Cadogan, and Mildred Strut (1867–1942), herself the daughter of Henry, 1st Baron Alington. She was a goddaughter of Queen Alexandra.

On 17 February 1920, Mary married John "Bert", Marquess of Blandford, elder son and heir of the 9th Duke of Marlborough and Consuelo Vanderbilt, at St Margaret's, Westminster. The ceremony was attended by George V and Queen Mary. She was given in marriage by her stepfather, the Hon. Sir Hedworth Meux. The groom's mother transferred the lease of her home at No. 1 Portman Square to the newlyweds. The couple settled at Lowesby Hall in Leicestershire. They had five children:

- Lady Sarah Consuelo Spencer-Churchill (17 December 1921 – 13 October 2000)
- Lady Caroline Spencer-Churchill (12 November 1923 – 5 January 1992)
- John George Vanderbilt Henry Spencer-Churchill, 11th Duke of Marlborough (13 April 1926 – 16 October 2014)
- Lady Rosemary Mildred Spencer-Churchill (born 24 July 1929)
- Lord Charles George William Colin Spencer-Churchill (13 July 1940 – 21 December 2016)

In 1928, the Blandfords moved their London residence to No. 27 Hill Street. They sold the house in October 1936 and later that year acquired the Crown Lease of No. 11 Kensington Palace Gardens. In 1946, No. 11 was sold to the French government for use as the French ambassador's official residence.

In 1934, her father-in-law died, and Blandford succeeded as 10th Duke of Marlborough, making Mary his duchess. They sold Lowesby Hall to Sir Keith Nuttall, 2nd Baronet, and moved to the family seat of Blenheim Palace. The Marlboroughs enjoyed entertaining and made many improvements to Blenheim, such as plumbing upgrades and the installation of bathrooms. They entertained Edward VIII and Wallis Simpson at Blenheim in July 1936, the summer before the abdication crisis.

On 7 July 1939, she hosted a coming-out ball for her eldest daughter Lady Sarah at Blenheim Palace, which was considered the most brilliant social occasion of the 1939 season – the last before World War II. 1,000 guests attended the ball including her husband's cousin Winston Churchill, Chips Channon, Ian Fleming, and a young John F. Kennedy.

== Service ==
During World War II, Mary served as a chief commandant in the Auxiliary Territorial Service, thus outranking her husband – a retired captain in the Life Guards – who served as a military liaison officer. She relinquished her position in the ATS after giving birth to her fifth child in 1940. Later, she served with the Women's Voluntary Service and was president of Oxfordshire branch of the British Red Cross. She became a member of the executive committee of the Red Cross in 1944, a council member in 1950, and an honorary life member in 1954. She designed a new women's Red Cross uniform in 1958.

After the war, the Marlboroughs opened Blenheim Palace up to paying visitors. Mary and her husband attended the coronation of Elizabeth II in 1953, where her third daughter Lady Rosemary served as a maid of honour. In 1954, she invited Christian Dior to showcase his collection at Blenheim in aid of the Red Cross. She personally visited Dior in Paris wearing her Red Cross uniform, to his amusement. She later invited Dior's successor Yves Saint Laurent to stage a show in 1958, at which Princess Margaret was the guest of honour.

From 1946 to 1951, Mary was mayor of Woodstock, the first woman to hold the position. As mayor, she presided over the ceremony in which Winston Churchill was granted the freedom of Woodstock. She also sat on the Oxfordshire County Council for six years until 1952. In 1947, she was made a commander (sister) of the Order of St John (CStJ). For her work with the Red Cross, she was made a commander of the Order of the British Empire (CBE) in the 1953 New Year Honours.

== Death ==
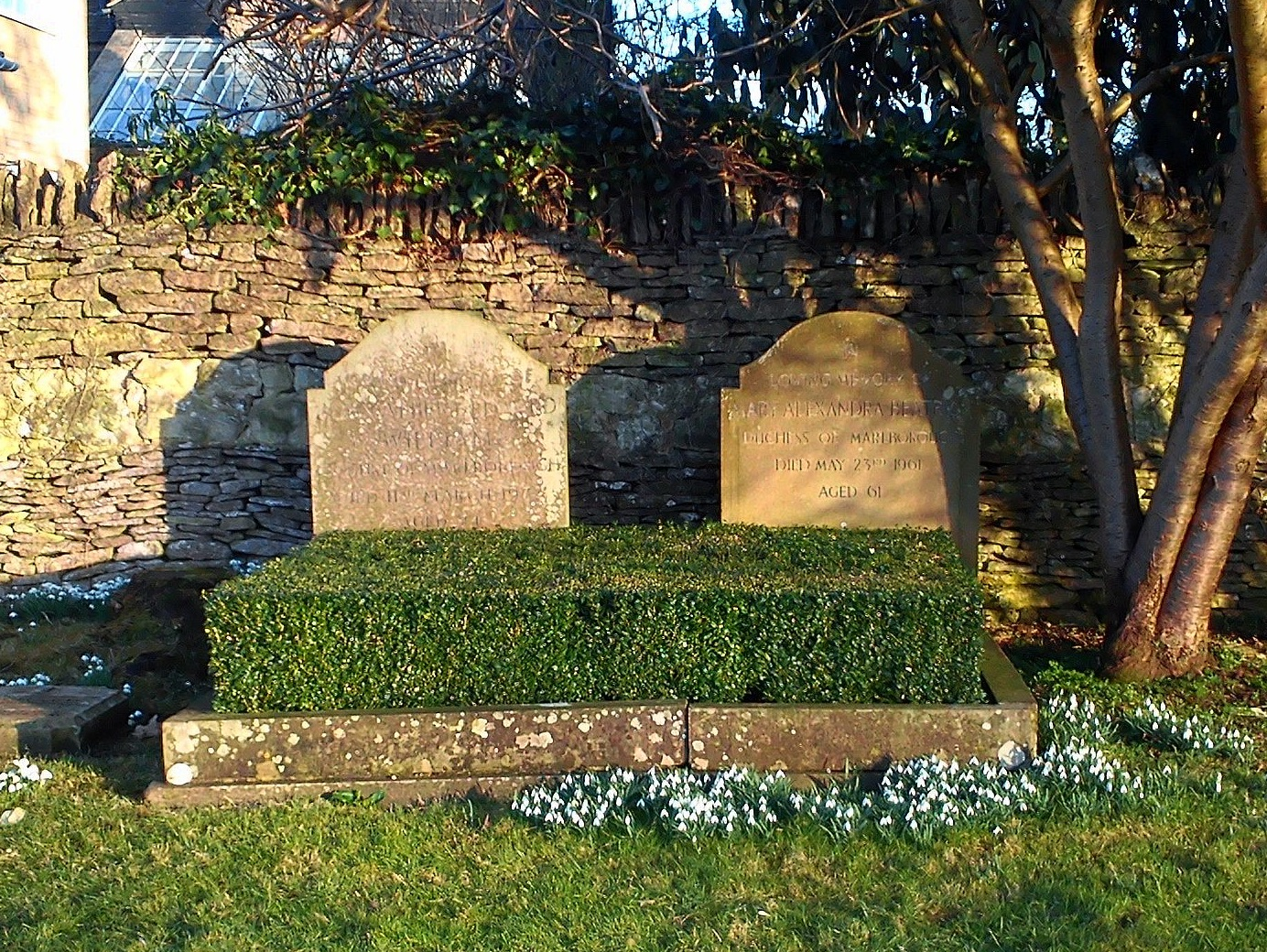
The graves of Mary and her husband at St Martin's Church, Bladon.

After a lengthy illness, Mary died of cancer at Blenheim Palace on 23 May 1961, aged 61. She was buried in the churchyard at St Martin's Church, Bladon, near the palace. Her widower, who survived her by 11 years, remarried Laura Canfield in 1972, six weeks before his own death.
