= Lady Sarah Spencer-Churchill =

British socialite and philanthropist(1921–2000)

- Born: 17 December 1921; Marylebone, London, England
- Died: 13 October 2000 (aged 78); Middletown, Connecticut, U.S.
- Spouses: Edwin F. Russell (m. 1943; div. 1966) Guy Burgos (m. 1966; div. 1967) Theo Roubanis (m. 1967; div. 1981)
- Children: 4
- Parents: John Spencer-Churchill, 10th Duke of Marlborough (father); Mary Cadogan (mother)

Lady Sarah Consuelo Spencer-Churchill (17 December 1921 – 13 October 2000) was a British socialite and philanthropist. She was the daughter of the 10th Duke of Marlborough.

== Early life ==
Spencer-Churchill was born on 17 December 1921, the eldest child of John, Marquess of Blandford, and the Hon. Mary Cadogan. She was christened Sarah Consuelo after her paternal grandmother, Consuelo Vanderbilt Balsan, on 17 January 1922 at St Margaret's, Westminster. She was raised at Lowesby Hall, her parent's home in Leicestershire. When she was 13-years-old, her father succeeded her grandfather as the 10th Duke of Marlborough and the family moved to Blenheim Palace.

On 7 July 1939, Spencer-Churchill's parents held her coming-out ball at Blenheim Palace. 1,000 guests included the Duke and Duchess of Kent, her kinsman Winston Churchill and his wife Clementine, Anthony Eden, Henry "Chips" Channon, Ian Fleming, and John F. Kennedy and his siblings. Music was provided by Ambrose and his orchestra. It was hailed as the most splendid occasion of the 1939 season, the last before World War II – now regarded as the "last season". On the event, Channon noted in his diary: "I have seen much, travelled far and am accustomed to splendour, but there has never been anything like tonight".

The war broke out just under two months after her ball. She worked in a munitions factory in Cowley under the name "Sally Churchill".

== Personal life ==
Spencer-Churchill was married three times. She first married Edwin Fairman Russell, a lieutenant in the United States Navy, on 15 May 1943 at St Margaret's Westminster. Winston Spencer Churchill was a pageboy. They settled in Oyster Bay, New York, and had four daughters:

- Serena Mary Churchill Russell (born 1944), she married Neil Balfour.
- Consuelo Sarah Russell (1946–2020), she married James Toback.
- Alexandra Brenda Russell (1949–2018)
- Jacqueline Russell (born 1958)

Spencer-Churchill obtained a divorce from Russell in Reno in 1966. She remarried Guillermo “Guy” Burgos Ossa, a Chilean playboy 16-years her junior, on 11 November 1966. The marriage was short lived and they divorced in Mexico the next year, remaining friends all their lives. Her third and final marriage was in Philadelphia in November 1967 to 27-year-old Greek actor Theodorus "Theo" Roubanis. They were divorced in 1981.

== Later life and death ==
Having made frequent visits to the United States as a child to visit her paternal grandmother Consuelo Vanderbilt, Spencer-Churchill lived permanently in the US after her first marriage. She was particularly close to her grandmother and inherited her house on Long Island when she died in 1964.

Spencer-Churchill maintained a home in Jamaica called 'Content' where she entertained Queen Elizabeth The Queen Mother. In January 1977, masked intruders robbed the home at gunpoint. She remained in Jamaica despite the attack, for which she was applauded by prime minister Michael Manley.

She was credited as a producer on the 1973 British-Greek film Medusa. Her husband at the time, Theo Roubanis, acted in and did the music for the film.

Spencer-Churchill died in Middletown, Connecticut, on 13 October 2000 at the age of 78. Her death occurred suddenly during surgery. After a funeral at St. James' Episcopal Church in Manhattan, she was cremated. Half of her ashes were interred with other members of the Spencer-Churchill family in the churchyard at St Martin's Church, Bladon, near Blenheim Palace, and the other half were spread in Jamaica.
