= John Spencer-Churchill, 11th Duke of Marlborough =

British peer (1926–2014)

His Grace The Duke of Marlborough JP DL
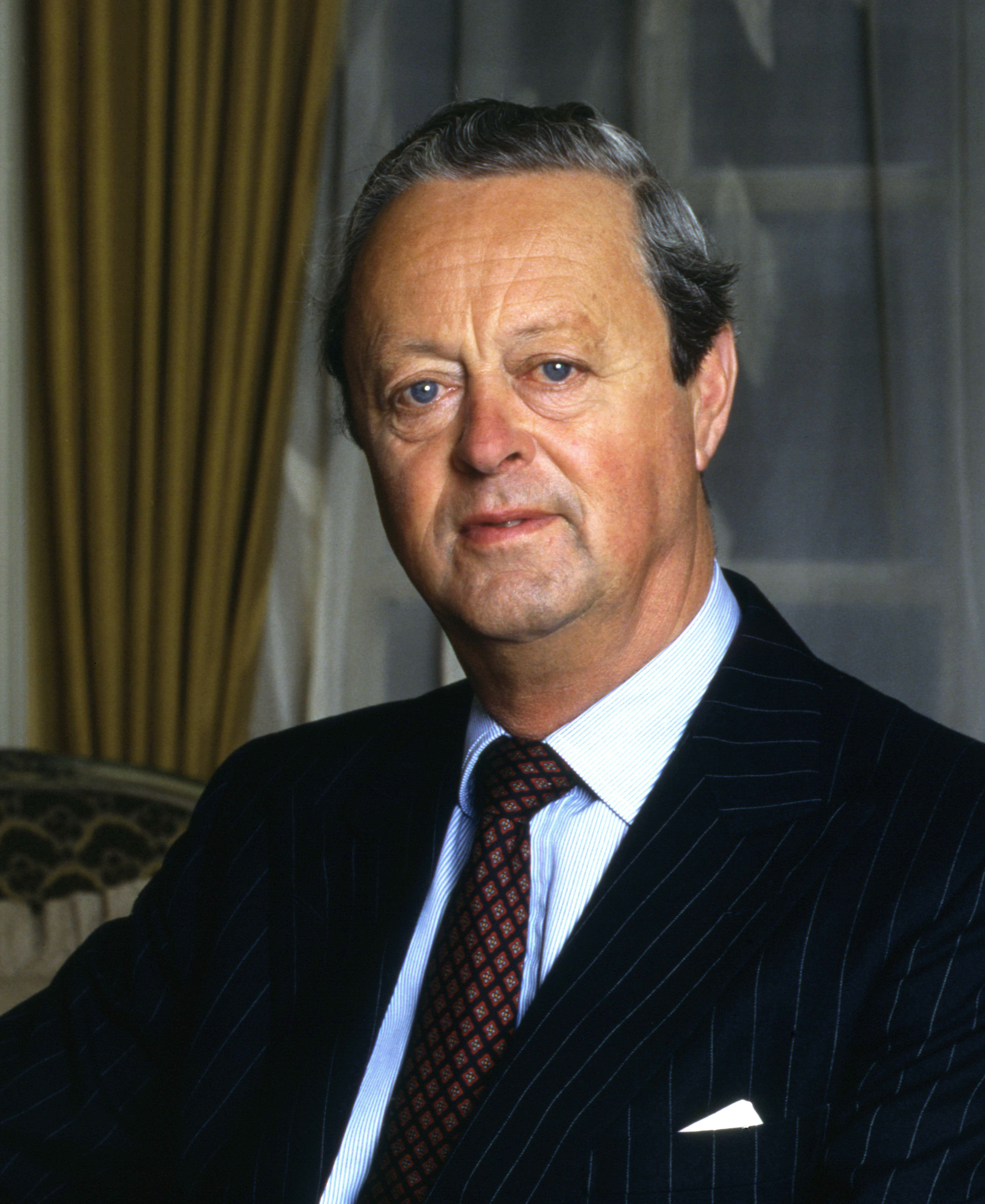
- Portrait by Allan Warren, 1984

Member of the House of Lords as Duke of Marlborough
- In office 10 March 1972 – 11 November 1999
- Preceded by: The 10th Duke of Marlborough
- Succeeded by: Seat abolished (pursuant to the House of Lords Act 1999)

Personal details
- Born: John George Vanderbilt Henry Spencer-Churchill, Earl of Sunderland; 13 April 1926 1 Portman Square, Marylebone, London
- Died: 16 October 2014 (aged 88) Woodstock, Oxfordshire, England
- Spouses: Susan Mary Hornby (m. 1951; div. 1961) Tina Onassis (m. 1961; div. 1971) Countess Rosita Douglas (m. 1972; div. 2008) Lily Sahni (m. 2008)
- Children: John Spencer-Churchill, Earl of Sunderland; James Spencer-Churchill, 12th Duke of Marlborough; Lady Henrietta Spencer-Churchill; Lord Richard Spencer-Churchill; Lord Edward Spencer-Churchill; Lady Alexandra Spencer-Churchill
- Parents: The 10th Duke of Marlborough; Mary Cadogan

John George Vanderbilt Henry Spencer-Churchill, 11th Duke of Marlborough (13 April 1926 – 16 October 2014), styled Earl of Sunderland until 1934 and Marquess of Blandford between 1934 and 1972, was a British Army officer and peer. He was the elder son of the 10th Duke of Marlborough and his wife, the Hon. Mary Cadogan. He was known as "Sunny" after his childhood courtesy title of Earl of Sunderland.

His principal seat was Blenheim Palace, Woodstock, Oxfordshire. He was ranked 224th in the Sunday Times Rich List 2004, with an estimated wealth of £185 million.

== Early life ==
Sunderland was born on 13 April 1926 at 1 Portman Square, Marylebone, his parent's London home. He was the elder son of the then Marquess of Blandford (later 10th Duke of Marlborough), and the Hon. Mary Cadogan. He was christened on 31 May at St Margaret's, Westminster. His godparents were King George V, Winston Churchill (his paternal grandfather's first cousin), Lord Hillingdon (his maternal uncle-by-marriage), and Alva Belmont (his great-grandmother). He held the title Earl of Sunderland by courtesy from birth and derived his lifelong nickname of "Sunny" from the title.

The family primarily resided at Lowesby Hall in Leicestershire until 1934 when his father succeeded as 10th Duke of Marlborough and inherited Blenheim Palace. As heir to the dukedom, he was styled Marquess of Blandford. Like most men in his family, he was educated at Eton College.

== Career ==
After Eton, Blandford was commissioned as a second lieutenant in the Life Guards. He served with the regiment in Egypt and Germany and was promoted to lieutenant in 1948.In 1953, he was promoted to the rank of captain before resigning his commission and joining the Regular Army Reserve of Officers.

In 1953, Blandford purchased Lee Place, a large Georgian manor house, and its surrounding 57 acres, near Charlbury in West Oxfordshire, neighbouring the Blenheim estate. Lee Place had formerly been the dower house of the neighbouring Ditchley Park Estate.

On 11 March 1972, his father died and he succeeded as 11th Duke of Marlborough. He assumed the management of Blenheim Palace and the Blenheim estate. To fund the maintenance of the house, he opened it to visitors and as a film set, and established a number of businesses, including a garden furniture company and a water bottling plant.

In 1974, Marlborough was appointed a deputy lieutenant of Oxfordshire. He was also active in a range of organisations, including the Thames and Chilterns Tourist Board and Oxford United Football Club. He served as vice-president of the Witney Conservative Association, the local party of David Cameron.

== Personal life and death ==
In his youth, Blandford was often romantically linked to Princess Margaret in the press.

He married his first wife Susan Mary Hornby (1929–2005), daughter of Michael Hornby, at St Margaret's, Westminster, on 19 October 1951. Queen Elizabeth and Princess Margaret were among the 1,000 guests. Blandford's best man was Billy Wallace. They had three children:

- John David Ivor Spencer-Churchill, Earl of Sunderland (17 November 1952 – 14 May 1955); a godson of Princess Margaret, he died of a kidney ailment in infancy.
- Charles James Spencer-Churchill, 12th Duke of Marlborough (born 24 November 1955)
- Lady Henrietta Mary Spencer-Churchill (born 7 October 1958)

She left for another man in 1961; Blandford gained custody of their two surviving children. He married his second wife Greek heiress Tina Livanos Onassis (daughter of Stavros G. Livanos and former wife of Aristotle Onassis) on 23 October 1961 in Paris, first in a civil ceremony then a religious ceremony at St. Stephen's Greek Orthodox Cathedral. They had no children and were divorced in March 1971.

Marlborough married his third wife Swedish aristocrat Countess Rosita Douglas on 20 May 1972 at Caxton Hall followed by a religious blessing at St Mary's Church, Charlbury. The Duke and Duchess were divorced in 2008. They had three children:

- Lord Richard Spencer-Churchill (13 August 1973 – 25 December 1973)
- Lord Edward Albert Charles Spencer-Churchill (born 1974); he dated socialite Annabelle Neilson between 2002 and 2009. He married Kimberly Hammerstroem civilly on 4 July 2018 at Mayfair Library and religiously on 7 July at Blenheim Palace.
- Lady Alexandra Elizabeth Spencer-Churchill (born 1977)

At the age of 82, Marlborough married Iranian-born Lily Mahtani (née Sahni; born circa 1954–57) on 3 December 2008 in the chapel at Blenheim Palace.

Marlborough died on 16 October 2014 at the age of 88. His funeral was held on 24 October at the Church of St Mary Magdalene, Woodstock.

== Arms ==
Coat of arms of John Spencer-Churchill, 11th Duke of Marlborough
Adopted 1817 by the 5th Duke of Marlborough Coronet The coronet of a Duke Crest 1st: a lion couchant guardant Argent supporting a banner Gules charged with a dexter hand couped Argent (Churchill); 2nd: out of a ducal coronet Or a griffin's head between two wings expanded Argent gorged with a collar gemel and armed Gules (Spencer) Escutcheon Quarterly: 1 and 4th, Sable a lion rampant Argent, on a canton of the second a cross Gules (Churchill); 2 and 3rd, quarterly Argent and Gules a fret Or, over all on a bend Sable three Escallops of the first (Spencer); over all in the centre chief point (as an augmentation of honour) an escutcheon Argent charged with the cross of Saint George surmounted by an inescutcheon Azure charged with three fleurs-de-lys Or, two over one Supporters On either side, a wyvern wings elevated Gules Motto FIEL PERO DESDICHADO (Spanish for "FAITHFUL, THOUGH UNFORTUNATE")

== Ancestry ==
Ancestors of John Spencer-Churchill, 11th Duke of Marlborough

8. George Spencer-Churchill, 8th Duke of Marlborough
4. Charles Spencer-Churchill, 9th Duke of Marlborough
9. Lady Albertha Hamilton
2. John Spencer-Churchill, 10th Duke of Marlborough
10. William Kissam Vanderbilt
5. Consuelo Vanderbilt
11. Alva Smith
1. John Spencer-Churchill, 11th Duke of Marlborough
12. George Cadogan, 5th Earl Cadogan
6. Henry Cadogan, Viscount Chelsea
13. Lady Beatrix Craven
3. The Hon. Mary Cadogan
14. Henry Sturt, 1st Baron Alington
7. The Hon. Mildred Sturt
15. Lady Augusta Bingham

Peerage of England
Preceded by John Spencer-Churchill	Duke of Marlborough; 1972–2014	Succeeded by Jamie Spencer-Churchill
