= John Spencer-Churchill, 10th Duke of Marlborough =

British Army officer and peer (1897–1972)

His Grace The Duke of Marlborough DL
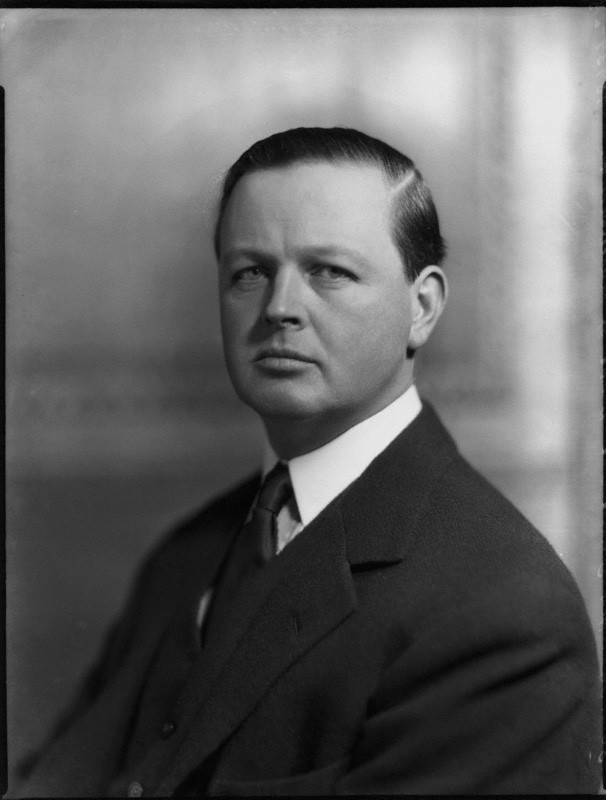
- Portrait by Bassano Ltd, 1934

Member of the House of Lords as Duke of Marlborough
- In office 30 June 1934 – 11 March 1972
- Preceded by: Charles Spencer-Churchill
- Succeeded by: John Spencer-Churchill

Personal details
- Born: John Albert Edward William Spencer-Churchill, Marquess of Blandford; 18 September 1897 Spencer House, St James's, London, England
- Died: 11 March 1972 (aged 74) London, England
- Spouses: Mary Cadogan (m. 1920; died 1961) Laura Canfield (m. 1972)
- Children: Lady Sarah Spencer-Churchill; Lady Caroline Waterhouse; John Spencer-Churchill, 11th Duke of Marlborough; Lady Rosemary Muir; Lord Charles Spencer-Churchill
- Parents: Charles Spencer-Churchill, 9th Duke of Marlborough (father); Consuelo Vanderbilt (mother)

John Albert Edward William Spencer-Churchill, 10th Duke of Marlborough (18 September 1897 – 11 March 1972), styled Marquess of Blandford until 1934, was a British Army officer and peer.

The son of the 9th Duke of Marlborough and Consuelo Vanderbilt Balsan, he opened his ancestral home of Blenheim Palace to the public in 1950 and is known as a pioneer of the "stately homes" business.

== Early life ==
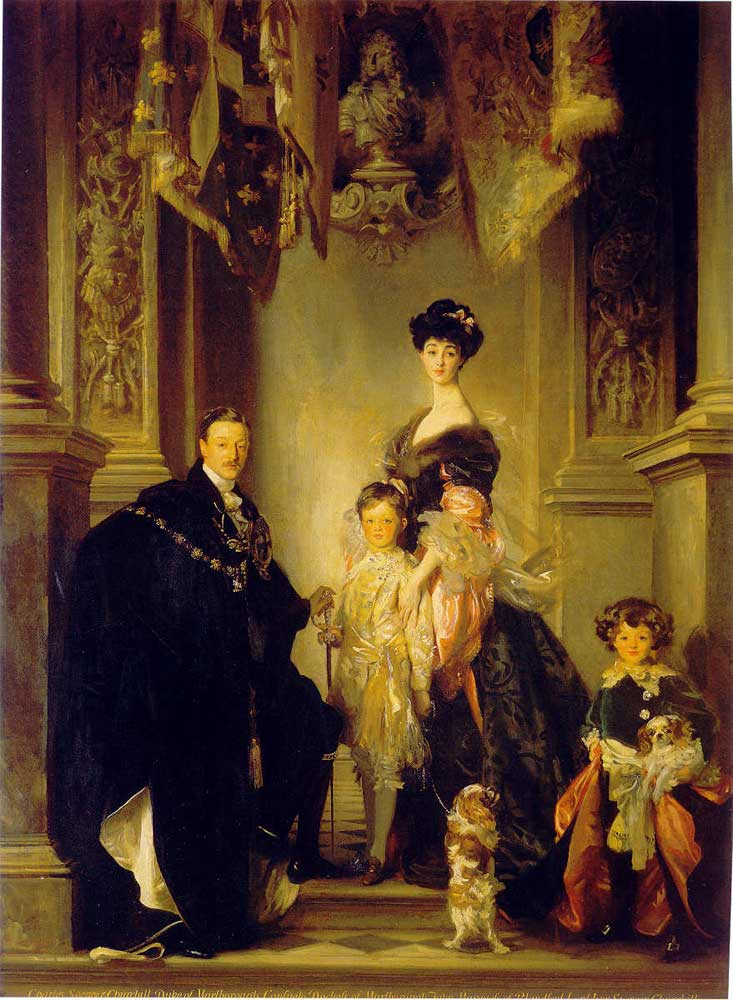
Portrait of Blandford, centre, with his parents and younger brother by John Singer Sargent, 1905.

Blandford was born 18 September 1897 at Spencer House in St James's, London. He was the elder son and heir of Charles, 9th Duke of Marlborough, and his first wife, American railroad heiress Consuelo Vanderbilt. His parents, without a permanent London home of their own, had been leasing Spencer House from the Earl Spencer, but his mother felt it was appropriate as the Earls Spencer were descended from the 1st Duke of Marlborough.

He was christened at the Chapel Royal at St James's Palace with Albert Edward, Prince of Wales (later Edward VII), as his godfather. His maternal grandfather also served as a godfather. He was named John Albert Edward William, after the 1st Duke of Marlborough, the Prince of Wales, and his maternal grandfather, William Kissam Vanderbilt. From birth, he held the title Marquess of Blandford by courtesy and was known to family and friends as "Bert".

His younger brother Lord Ivor Spencer-Churchill was born in 1898. Their mother famously referred to the brothers as "the heir and the spare". His parent's marriage was an unharmonious arranged marriage of convenience. They separated in 1906 and divorced in 1921. Later that year his mother remarried French aviator Jacques Balsan and his father remarried American socialite Gladys Deacon.

Blandford was educated at Eton College before joining the Life Guards. He served with distinction as a captain in the Guards in France and Belgium during World War I.

== Career ==
On 30 June 1934, his father died and he succeeded as 10th Duke of Marlborough. He moved his family to Blenheim Palace, the palatial seat of the dukes of Marlborough in Woodstock, Oxfordshire. In 1936, he was appointed a deputy lieutenant of Oxfordshire. From 1937 to 1942, he served as mayor of Woodstock. His first wife would later serve as the first female mayor of the town.

Having retired from the Life Guards by the outbreak of World War II, Marlborough served as a military liaison officer with the United States forces in Britain. He was awarded the American Bronze Star Medal.

In 1950, Marlborough opened the grounds and some rooms of Blenheim Palace (including the bedroom where his first cousin once removed Sir Winston Churchill was born) to the public to help defray the cost of upkeep. He is considered as one of the originators of the "stately homes" business.

== Personal life ==
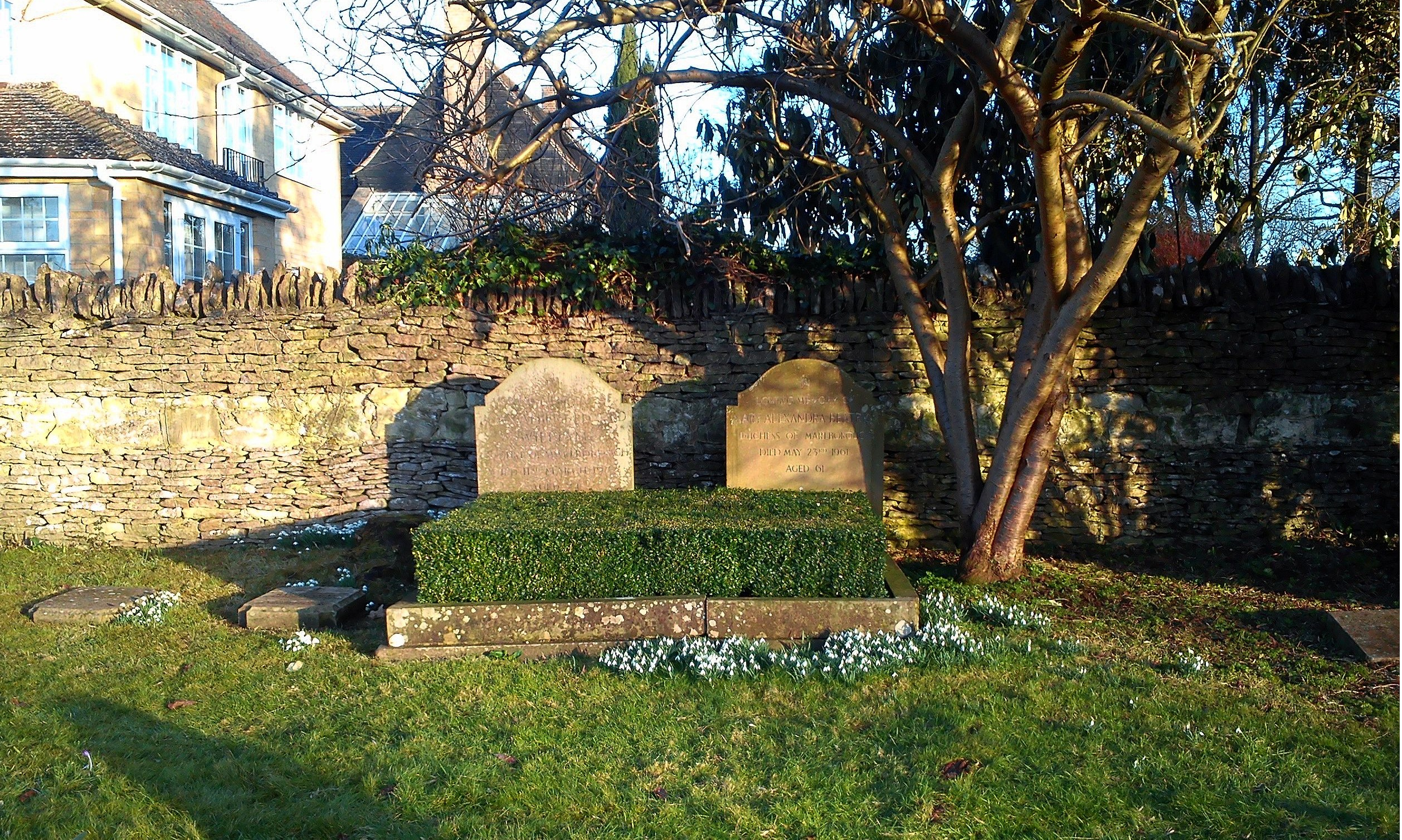
The grave of Marlborough and his first wife at St Martin's Church, Bladon

On 17 February 1920, Blandford married the Hon. Mary Cadogan, daughter of the late Viscount Chelsea, in a ceremony at St Margaret's, Westminster attended by George V and Queen Mary. They had five children:

- Lady Sarah Consuelo Spencer-Churchill (1921–2000)
- Lady Caroline Spencer-Churchill (1923–1992), she married Major Charles Huguenot Waterhouse (1918–2007) in 1946.
- John George Vanderbilt Henry Spencer-Churchill, 11th Duke of Marlborough (1926–2014)
- Lady Rosemary Mildred Spencer-Churchill (born 1929)
- Lord Charles George William Colin Spencer-Churchill (1940–2016), he married, firstly, Gillian Spreckels Fuller (born 1946) in 1965, they divorced in 1968. He married, secondly, Elizabeth Jane Wyndham (born 1948) in 1970.

His first wife died in 1961. On 26 January 1972, six weeks before his own death, Marlborough married his second wife, Laura Canfield (née Charteris), widow of the American publishing heir Michael Temple Canfield (whose first wife had been Caroline Lee Bouvier), at Caxton Hall. Canfield was the second daughter of the Hon. Guy Lawrence Charteris (the second son of the 11th Earl of Wemyss). She had previously married and divorced the 2nd Viscount Long and the 3rd Earl of Dudley.

=== Inheritance ===
==== Estate of William K. Vanderbilt I ====
Following the death of his maternal grandfather William Kissam Vanderbilt I in 1920, Lord Blandford and his brother Lord Ivor Churchill each received $1,000,000 from his estate, as well as a joint trust fund of $900,000.

==== Vanderbilt trust funds ====
William K. Vanderbilt had also placed $5,000,000 in a Trust in 1912, which his daughter Consuelo was to receive the life income from, which would be paid to her sons jointly after her death; Vanderbilt settled an additional $450,000 in this trust in 1919. Consuelo died in 1964; she did not leave any property to her older son in her will, which stated that this was due to the ample provision already made for him under trusts settled by William K. Vanderbilt.

==== 9th Duke of Marlborough's 1895 marriage settlement ====
Under the terms of their 1895 marriage settlement, the 9th Duke of Marlborough enjoyed the income from a $2,500,000 trust fund created by Consuelo's father; after his death the income was to be paid to Consuelo for her lifetime, after which the next Duke of Marlborough would receive the income (provided that he was a descendant of Consuelo and the 9th Duke). Although Consuelo began to receive the income from this Trust following the 9th Duke's death in 1934, a 1944 court ruling in the Chancery Division of the English High Court of Justice held that death duties on this trust had become payable by the 10th Duke of Marlborough upon the death of the 9th Duke in 1934. The duties, with interest added for the period between the 9th Duke's death and 12 April 1946 amounted to approximately £175,000. Following the passage of the Trusts Variation Act in 1958, the 10th Duke of Marlborough (the-then life-tenant of the trust) and his son John Spencer-Churchill, Marquess of Blandford (the-then remainderman of the trust) obtained a court order to vary the Trust in 1962; the result was that the 10th Duke was no longer the life tenant of the trust, and therefore no death duties were levied upon the Trust upon his death.

==== Blenheim estate ====
Following his death in 1934, the 9th Duke of Marlborough's personal estate in the United Kingdom was valued at £18,005 for Probate; a further grant in respect of settled land was issued in December 1934 valued at £118,223 to the 10th Duke. During the early 1960s the 10th Duke transferred approximately 7,000 acres of the 11,500-acre Blenheim Estate to his oldest son. As this transfer was completed more than seven years prior to the 10th Duke's death, the land was not subject to death duties when he died. At the time of his death the 10th Duke retained ownership of approximately 1,000 acres of the Blenheim Estate, and was leasing the estate's home farm from his son.

=== Residences ===
As a wedding present, Lord Blandford's mother Consuelo, Duchess of Marlborough, transferred the lease of her London home at No. 1 Portman Square to him. Lord and Lady Blandford continued to maintain No. 1 Portman Square as their London home until May 1928, when they took a new lease of No. 27 Hill Street from the Grosvenor Estate. During the 1920s and early 1930s, Lord and Lady Blandford also maintained a country residence at Lowesby Hall in Leicestershire.

Following the death Blandford's father, the 9th Duke of Marlborough, in June 1934, Blandford succeeded as 10th Duke and inherited the family's ancestral Oxfordshire seat Blenheim Palace. The new Duke and Duchess moved to Blenheim, and Lowesby Hall was sold to Sir Edmund Keith Nuttall, 2nd Baronet. The lease on No. 27 Hill Street was sold in October 1936, and in November of the same year, the Duke purchased the Crown Lease of a large, standalone London mansion at No. 11 Kensington Palace Gardens from Sir Malcolm Perks, 2nd Bt. No. 11 Kensington Palace Gardens remained as the Marlborough's London residence until the outbreak of World War II in 1939.

During the War the house was requisitioned by the British Army. The Duke later sold his lease of Np. 11 Kensington Palace Gardens to the French Government in September 1946 for £25,000, and the house became the Official Residence of the French Ambassador to the United Kingdom.

== Death ==
The Duke died at a hospital in London on 11 March 1972 at the age of 74. He was succeeded by his elder son John, Marquess of Blandford. He and his first wife are buried in the churchyard of St Martin's Church, Bladon.

Peerage of England
Preceded by Charles Spencer-Churchill	Duke of Marlborough; 1934–1972	Succeeded by John Spencer-Churchill
