= Nuttall (name) =

Nuttall is an English surname, possibly derived from the small village of that name in Bury parish, Lancashire, and first found in the 13th century. It has been and remains a very common name in parts of Lancashire from the 16th century onward.

== People with the surname ==
- Alex Nuttall (born 1985), Canadian politician
- Amy Nuttall (born 1982), British actress
- Anthony Nuttall (1937–2007), English literary critic
- Anthony Nuttall (rugby league) (born 1968), Irish rugby league footballer
- Bill Nuttall (born 1948), American soccer player and businessman
- Billy Nuttall (1920–1963), English footballer
- Carrie Nuttall (born 1963), American photographer
- Charles Nuttall (1872–1934), Australian artist
- David Nuttall (born 1962), British politician
- Edmund Nuttall (priest) (died 1616), Canon of Windsor
- Sir Edmund Nuttall, 1st Baronet (1870–1923), British civil engineer
- Edward Nuttall (born 1993), New Zealand cricketer
- Enos Nuttall (1842–1916), English clergyman, Archbishop of the West Indies
- George Nuttall (1863–1937), British-American bacteriologist
- Gordon Nuttall (1953–2025), Australian politician
- Harry Nuttall (politician) (1849–1924), British politician
- Harry Nuttall (footballer) (1897–1969), English footballer
- Harry Nuttall (racing driver) (born 1963), British auto racing driver
- Henry Nuttall (1855–1945), English cricketer
- Jack Nuttall (1929–1992), Australian rules footballer
- James Nuttall (runner) (1840–1907), professional British runner
- James W. Nuttall (born 1953), United States Army major general
- Jeff Nuttall (1933–2004), British poet
- Jimmy Nuttall (1899–1945), English footballer
- Joce Nuttall (born 1961), New Zealand professor of education
- John Mitchell Nuttall (1890–1958), English physicist
- Joseph Nuttall (1869–1942), English swimmer
- Kate Henshaw-Nuttall (born 1971), Nigerian actress
- Katharina Nuttall (born 1972), Norwegian artist, composer, and music producer
- Keir Nuttall (born 1975), Australian musician
- Laura Nuttall (born 1999), Australian politician
- L. John Nuttall (1834–1905), English Latter-Day Saint
- L. John Nuttall (educator) (1887–1944), American academic, acting president of Brigham Young University
- Michael Nuttall (born 1934), South African Anglican bishop
- Mike Nuttall, British-American designer
- Nicholas Nuttall (1933–2007), British soldier, businessman and conservationist
- Nick Nuttall (born 1958), British musician and journalist, Head of Media, UN Environment Programme
- P. Austin Nuttall (1792/3–1869), British dictionary publisher
- Pat Nuttall (born 1953), British virologist and acarologist
- Paul Nuttall (born 1976), British politician
- Robert Nuttall (1908–1983), English footballer
- Sonja Nuttall, British fashion designer
- Thomas Nuttall (1786–1859), English botanist and zoologist
- Tom Nuttall (1889–1963), English footballer
- Wilmer John Nuttall (1920–2003), Canadian politician
- Zelia Nuttall (1857–1933), American archaeologist

== Fictional character ==
- Thomas “Tom” Nuttall, saloon owner in American TV series Deadwood, portrayed by Leon Rippy

== See also ==
- Nuttall (disambiguation)
- John Nuttall (disambiguation)
