= John Nuttall =

John Nuttall may refer to:

- John Nuttall (athlete) (1967–2023), British Olympian
- John Nuttall (boxer) (1919–2005), Indian Olympian
- John Nuttall (cricketer) (born 1967), English cricketer
- John Nuttall (MP), for Tamworth (UK Parliament constituency) in 1572–1583
- John Mitchell Nuttall (1890–1958), English physicist

== See also ==
- Jack Nuttall (1929–1992), Australian rules footballer
- L. John Nuttall (1834–1905), Latter Day Saints leader
- L. John Nuttall (educator) (1887–1944), American university academic
