= Lowesby Hall =

Country house in Leicestershire, England

Coordinates: 52.6609°N 0.9343°W

Lowesby Hall is a large Grade II* Georgian mansion in the parish and former manor of Lowesby, eight miles east of Leicester in Leicestershire. It is a famous fox-hunting seat in the heart of the Quorn country. The poem "Lowesby Hall" by the Victorian English foxhunting MP William Bromley Davenport (1821–1884) was a parody of Alfred Tennyson's 1835 poem Locksley Hall.

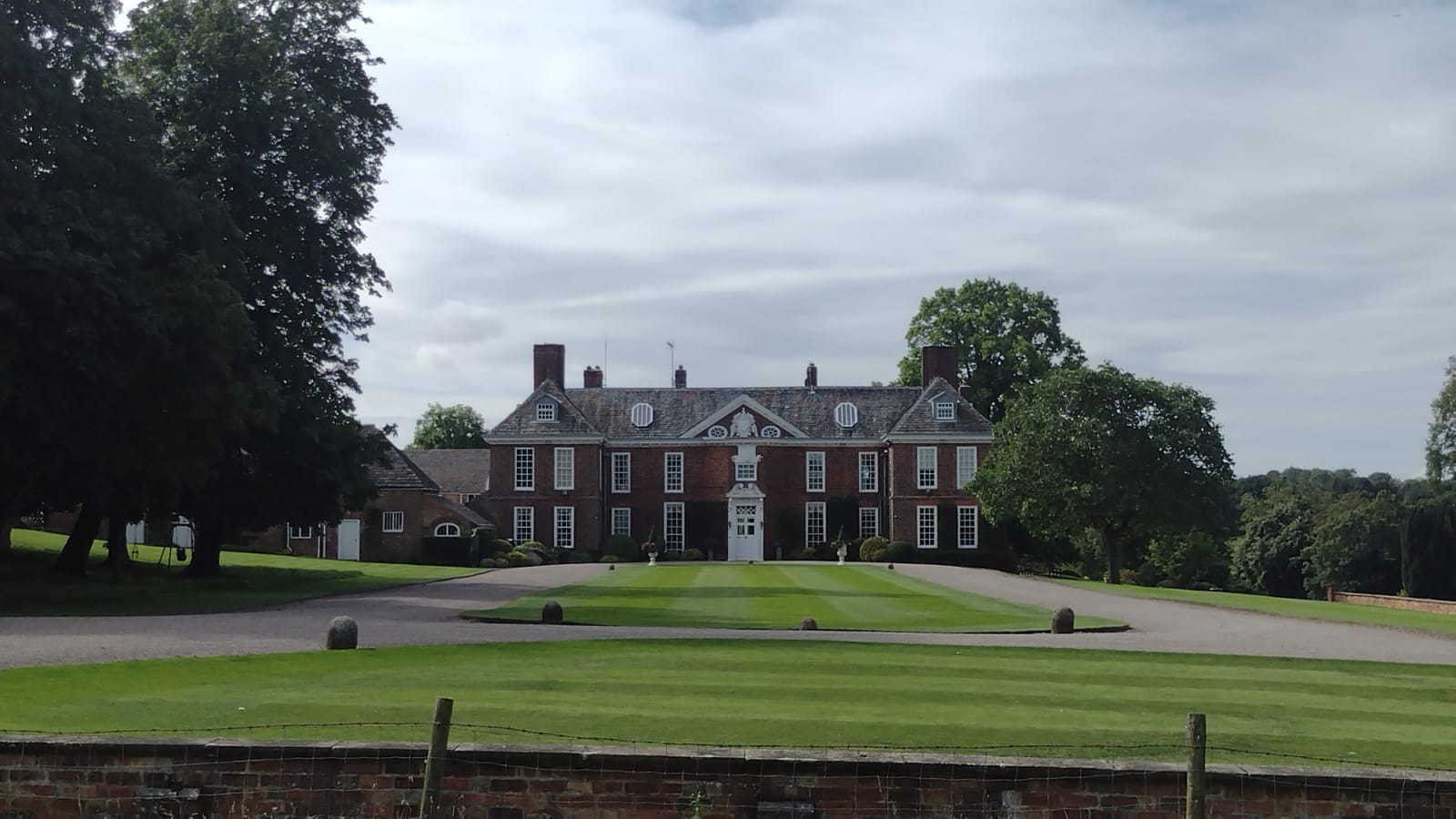
Lowesby Hall from the North East, August 2023

== History ==
=== Burdet ===
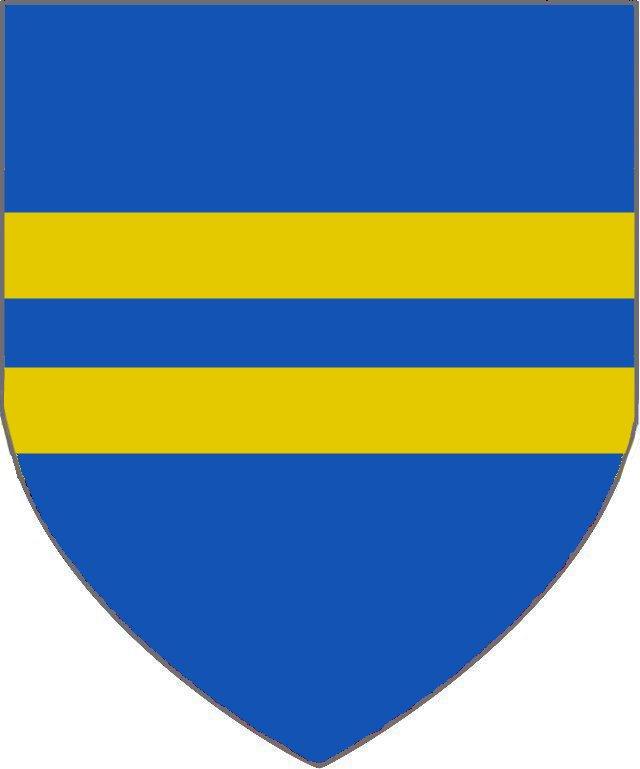
Arms of Burdet of Lowesby: Azure, two bars or

The Domesday Book of 1086 lists the manor of Glowesbi as one of those held by "Countess Judith", namely the Norman noblewoman Judith of Lens (c.1054/5-c.1090), a niece of King William the Conqueror, being a daughter of his sister Adelaide of Normandy, Countess of Aumale, by her husband Lambert II, Count of Lens. She married Earl Waltheof of Huntingdon and Northumbria (d.1076) the last of the Anglo-Saxon earls and the only English aristocrat to be executed during the reign of William the Conqueror. Before the Norman Conquest of 1066 she held 14 manors, all within the hundred of Wraggoe, Lincolnshire, and in 1086 she held 191 manors as a tenant-in-chief of William the Conqueror. Her tenant at Lowesby was Hugh Burdet, who is listed in the Domesday Book as holding six manors in total, all in Leicestershire, namely: Braunstone, Gaulby, Lowesby, Rearsby, Sysonby and Welby. Lowesby continued to be held by the Burdet family until the early 15th century. Sir William Burdet (died pre-1309) of Lowesby was a Member of Parliament for the county seat of Leicestershire in 1297. The Burdet family had been dedicated supporters of the Order of St Lazarus's English headquarters at Burton Lazars since its earliest days but relations soured in 1294 when the Order appropriated the tithes to Lowesby for themselves. This was not popular with the villagers and sporadic riots broke out over the following few years. The vicar was excommunicated and in 1297 the churchyard was "polluted by bloodshed" by the actions of Sir William Burdet. On the ending of the male line, the heiress, Joan Burdet, daughter and heiress of John Burdet of Lowesby married Thomas Ashby (d.1435), MP, and thus Lowesby passed into the ownership of her Ashby descendants.

=== Ashby ===
Thomas Ashby (d.1435) of Lowesby was the son and heir of Richard Ashby of Lubbesthorpe and Welby in Leicestershire, by his wife Agnes Breedon, a daughter of William Breedon, MP, and sister and heiress of Ralph Breedon of Breedon. Stained glass windows survive in All Saints Church, Lowesby, showing the coats of arms of Burdet, Ashby (Argent, a lion rampant sable a chief gules) Zouche of Lubbesthorpe and other related families. Thomas Ashby served twice as a Member of Parliament for Leicestershire, in 1414 and 1419. Although the manor is recorded in 1309 as containing 12 households, and in 1377 containing 25 tax payers (equivalent to about 10 families), by 1487 the village had been razed to the ground and the land converted to pasture. In 1563 the manor contained only the Ashby Family at Lowesby Hall and three labouring families. The ancient parish church survives in its entirety, 200 metres to the south-east of Lowesby Hall, and 450 metres to the north and east of Lowesby Hall survive extensive village earthworks, showing the foundations of houses and lanes, a strip of well preserved ridge and furrow ploughland and three large dry fishponds, all classified in 1978 as a Scheduled Monument.

=== Wollaston ===
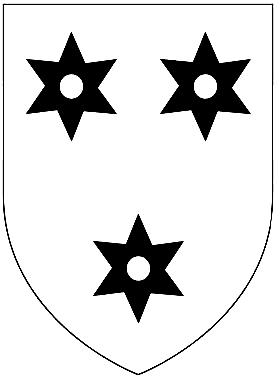
Arms of Wollaston: Argent, three mullets sable pierced of the field. These arms are said to be visible inside the house: "behind the corridor, the pedimented front of the original building line is visible: a large shield of arms of the Wollaston family is flanked by oculi in the pediment, which, like the rest, has a modillion cornice" (Listed Building text)

In the mid-17th.century the manor of Lowesby was acquired by Richard Wollaston (1635–1691), son of Henry Wollaston, a citizen of London in 1669, himself the younger brother of Sir John Wollaston (died 1658), Lord Mayor of London in 1643, and second son of Edward Wollaston of Perton in Staffordshire by his wife and cousin Elizabeth Wollaston of Trescot Grange, Staffordshire. He was thus descended from a junior branch of the Wollaston family anciently from Staffordshire and later settled at Shenton Hall, Leicestershire and Finborough Hall in Suffolk. He appears to have been a gun-founder. A Richard Wollaston served in a man-of-war and in 1650 received a gunner's certificate. He was described in 1650 as a "Master Gunner" on drawing from stores five barrels of gunpowder for a display on the launch of two frigates at Deptford. He has been described as "Cromwell's gun founder", and certainly held a high position in the Ordnance Department and was responsible to the Ordnance Commission. He had two sons Josiah and John (died 1692), who in 1669 purchased from Thomas Johnson a house at Wormley in Hertfordshire then occupied by their father Richard. Also in 1669 John purchased the Manor of Ponsbourne, formerly possessed by Sir Thomas Seymour, Lord Admiral of England. In 1673 Richard purchased a moiety of the manor of Wormley which was inherited by his son John (died 1692) thence to John's son Richard who in 1692 purchased the remaining moiety except the manor house of Wormley Bury. In 1685/8 Richard bequeathed a moiety of two farms in Essex to charity. In 1690 a year before his death he applied for the return of the sum of £10,000 he had loaned to the Prince of Orange, by then King William III. The Treasury Records contain the entry: "£140 paid to John Wollaston for the use of his father Richard on a/c of £10,000 part of £20,000 lent the King, and a further £50 on a/c of Poll Tax". Both these were Secret Service payments. On his death in 1691 he left land valued at £100 to the poor forever, £20 for clothing the poor in the parish of Woolmer, £30 to the parish of Whitchurch and £50 for 6 parishes in Leicester. He had the following descendants:

- Josiah Wollaston (1652–1689), son, who predeceased his father. He married Elizabeth Lawrence, sister of Sir Edward Lawrence, 1st Baronet (c. 1674 – 1749). His brother was John Wollaston whose son Richard Wollaston (c. 1678 – 1728) married Faith Brown and was MP for Whitchurch, Hants. 1695–1708.
- Isaac Wollaston (1673–1737), son and heir of Josiah, who married Sarah Lawrence. He was Sheriff of Leicestershire in 1697.
- Sir Isaac Wollaston, 2nd Baronet (died 1750) son and heir, who in 1749 by special remainder succeeded his grandmother's brother Sir Edward Lawrence, 1st Baronet (c. 1674 – 1749) in the Lawrence baronetcy, which title changed thenceforth to the Wollaston baronetcy. His wife died in 1753 leaving as heir an infant son Sir Isaac Lawrence Wollaston, 3rd Baronet.
- Sir Isaac Lawrence Wollaston, 3rd Baronet (died 1756), infant son, on whose death the baronetcy became extinct. The family estates having been divided in 1777 by Act of Parliament between his two sisters, Sarah Wollaston, the eldest, who later married Taylor White (the son of the barrister and arts patron Taylor White), and Anne Wollaston, their younger sister, who married in 1772 Sir Thomas Fowke (died 1786), (who was knighted in 1777), who in 1784 became Groom of the Bedchamber to Prince Frederick, Duke of Cumberland, the younger brother of King George III. Lowesby became the share of Anne Wollaston (Lady Fowke), and became the seat of her descendants the Fowke Baronets, who retained ownership until the 1900s.

=== Fowke ===
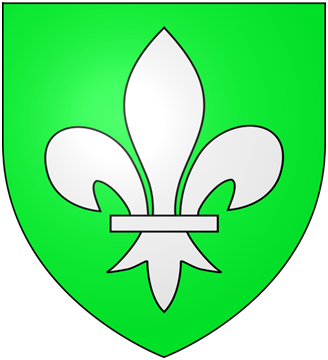
Arms of Fowke baronets of Lowesby: Vert, a fleur-de-lys argent At Lowesby Hall these arms are sculpted within an open pediment above the window over the front door

==== Sir Thomas Fowke ====
The Fowke family of Lowesby was formerly seated at Gunstone in Staffordshire. Anne Wollaston's husband was Lieutenant-General Sir Thomas Fowke, Groom of the Bedchamber to the Duke of Cumberland, the son of Lieutenant-General Thomas Fowke, Governor of Gibraltar.

==== Sir Frederick Fowke, 1st Baronet ====
Anne Wollaston's son was Sir Frederick Gustavus Fowke, 1st Baronet (1782-1856), a prominent Freemason who served as Provincial Grand Master of Leicestershire from 1850 to 1856 and as Senior Grand Warden for the United Grand Lodge of England in 1821. In his youth he had come into frequent contact with the Prince Regent and his royal brothers, the former giving him the soubriquet “Fred Fun”. He was said to be the perfect country gentleman, in the mould of Addison's "Sir Roger de Coverley". He was an "active and zealous" Tory politician and a member of the Pitt Club, and served as President of the Leicestershire Architectural and Archaeological Society. On 18 September 1818 he gave a "splendid fête" at Lowesby Hall ...

on the occasion of the christening of his two sons, honoured by the presence of the Duke of Rutland and of members of the leading county families. Magnificent apartments were constructed expressly for the accommodation of the visitors and a princely liberality was evidenced in all the arrangements. Upward of 400 persons sat down to supper. Lowesby is said indeed to have resembled one of the gorgeous scenes of oriental fiction on this memorable occasion. But it is to be lamented that its effects on the worthy baronet's fortune were serious and prolonged in their continuance.

In 1814, aged 32, he married Mary Anne Henderson, the only daughter of Anthony Henderson, MP for Brackley in Northamptonshire in 1803, and was created a baronet in the same year. He died in 1856 and was survived by his wife, 4 sons and 2 daughters, and was succeeded in the baronetcy by his eldest son Sir Frederick Thomas Fowke, 2nd Baronet.

==== Sir Frederick Thomas Fowke, 2nd Baronet ====
Sir Frederick Thomas Fowke, 2nd Baronet (1816–1897) was in 1846 appointed as a captain in the Leicestershire Militia. In 1849 he married Sarah Mary Spencer, the youngest daughter of Henry Leigh Spencer (1771-1829) of Banstead Park in Surrey, by his wife Elizabeth Frances Newton, heiress of Frye's estate on Antigua. A stained glass window survives in the east window of Lowesby Church in memory of him, showing images of twenty people and saints, all prominent figures who were important in the development of the English church, inscribed below: An honourable counsellor which also waited for the Kingdom of God. To the Glory of God and in memory of Sir Frederick Thomas Fowke died May 12 AD 1897 this window is dedicated by his widow Sarah Mary Fowke.

The 2nd Baronet was a barrister of the Middle Temple, who was called to the bar in 1840, and practiced locally on the Midland Circuit. He "occupied several of the most important and honourable offices in connection with county administration", serving from 1867 to 1883 as Chairman of the Quarter Sessions and thereafter as County Treasurer. On the formation of the Leicestershire County Council he served as an alderman. He was Lt-Col. of the Leicestershire Militia from 1869 to 1881 and was Constable of Leicester Castle, and a JP and DL for Leicestershire. In business he was a director of Pares's Leicestershire Banking Company and politically he was a staunch Conservative, serving as Chairman of Melton Division Conservative Association. He was an ardent foxhunter and served as President of the Quorn Hunt Committee for 40 years. It was said that "few men rode straighter to hounds than he". "A man of great stature and commanding aspect his remarkably abstemious habits through life ensured for him the enjoyment of robust health". He died at Lowesby Hall and was buried in his family vault within Lowesby Church.

By his wife he had 3 sons and 5 daughters. His eldest son Major Frederick Gustavus Fowke died in 1891, predeceasing his father, but left a son Sir Frederick Ferrers Conant Fowke, 3rd Baronet, who succeeded his grandfather as 3rd Baronet.

==== Sir Frederick Ferrers Conant Fowke, 3rd Baronet ====
In 1910 Sir Frederick Ferrers Conant Fowke, 3rd Baronet (1879–1948) married Edith Frances Daubenry Rawdon, a daughter of Rev Canon Rawdon of Stockton-on-Forest, Yorkshire, and a granddaughter of Joshua Rawdon, a merchant from Liverpool, the younger brother of the merchant and philanthropist Christopher Rawdon.

Lowesby Hall was eventually let by the Fowke family, which moved at some time to Upcott Farm in the parish of Bishops Tawton in Devon, to many subsequent tenants as a residence during the hunting season.

=== Brassey ===
The tenant in 1910 was Captain, later Lt-Col., Harold Brassey (c. 1880 – 1916), a polo champion, killed in action during WWI, a younger son of Henry Brassey, JP, DL, MP for Hastings, and brother of Henry Brassey, 1st Baron Brassey of Apethorpe. His grandfather Thomas Brassey had made a huge fortune as a railway engineer. Brassey commissioned Edwin Lutyens (1866–1944) to alter and extend the Hall and gardens, Lutyens having six years before altered his house at Copse Hill, Upper Slaughter, in Gloucestershire.

=== Spencer-Churchill ===
Lowesby was the home of John Spencer-Churchill, 10th Duke of Marlborough when still Marquess of Blandford, and heir apparent to his father the 9th Duke. In November 1927 his house-guest Lady Victoria Bullock, only daughter of Edward Stanley, 17th Earl of Derby and wife of Capt. Malcolm Bullock, MP, was killed while hunting with the Quorn Hounds from Hungarton, having caught her head on a low archway, and her body was returned to Lowesby Hall. On his father's death in 1934 he moved to Blenheim Palace in Oxfordshire and sold Lowesby to Sir Edmund Keith Nuttall, 2nd Baronet.

=== Nuttall ===
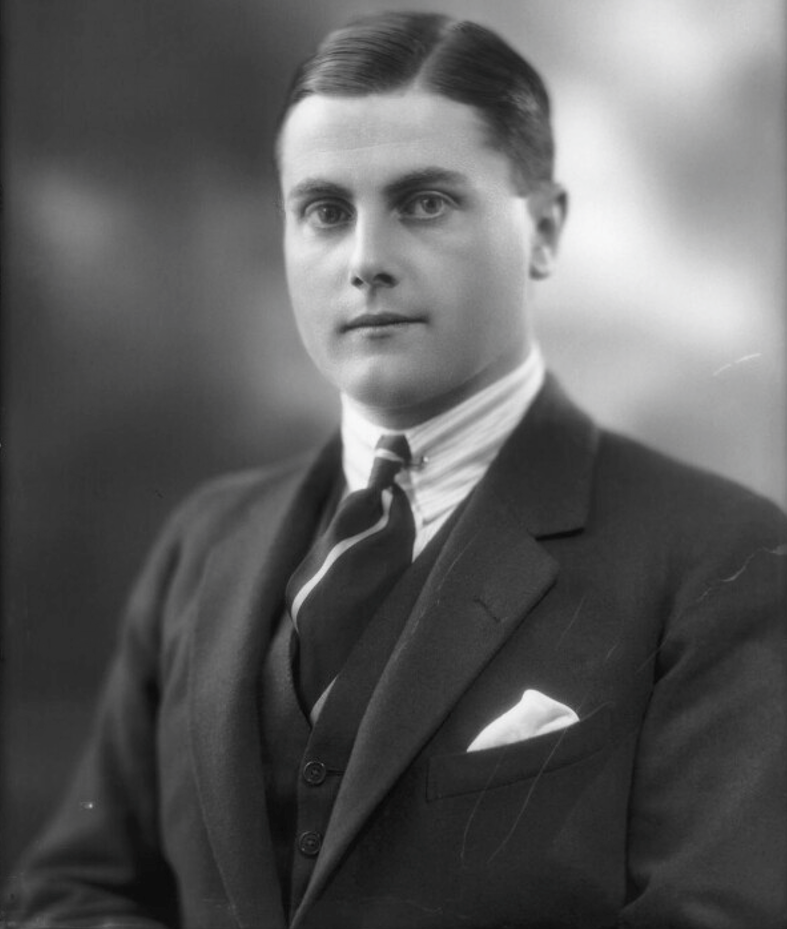
Sir (Edmund) Keith Nuttall, 2nd Baronet, aged 24, photo by Bassano 1925. He purchased Lowesby Hall in 1934 and was killed in action during WW II in 1941

Sir (Edmund) Keith Nuttall, 2nd Baronet (1901-1941) was from Cheshire, where his grandfather had founded the civil engineering firm Edmund Nuttall Limited, at Trafford Park in Manchester. He and his wife had been keen riders and foxhunters in Cheshire and their new home was in the heart of England's premier fox-hunting country, in which pursuit they became fully engaged, a local newspaper reporting in February 1936: "Sir Keith and Lady Nuttall made their debut as host and hostess at a Leicestershire meet yesterday when the Quorn's biggest following for several seasons assembled at Lowesby Hall". He was killed during the Second World War, whilst serving as Lieutenant Colonel with the Royal Engineers, having been wounded in the retreat to Dunkirk, and was succeeded in the baronetcy by his only son Sir Nicholas Nuttall, 3rd Baronet (1933-2007), then eight years old.

Sir Nicholas Nuttall served in the Royal Horse Guards and was a notable amateur jockey under National Hunt rules, twice winning the Grand Military Gold Cup at Sandown Park on his own horse, Stalbridge Park, in 1958 and 1961. He held a famous party at Lowesby Hall in 1959 to celebrate the restoration of a painted ceiling by Antonio Verrio (later destroyed by fire in 1980). In 1968, then serving as a Major and in command of the Guards Independent Parachute Regiment, he quit the Army to take control of the family firm, following the death of his mother. In 1976 he held a dance in tents at Lowesby, emulating a party held by the Shah of Iran in the desert in 1972. In 1978 he sold the family firm to the Dutch company Hollandsche Beton Group and sold Lowesby Hall and his other estate at The Elms, Thorpe Satchville in Leicestershire, to become a tax exile in Gstaad, Switzerland, and in the Bahamas, where he became an important campaigner for marine conservation, and founded the Bahamas Reef Environmental Educational Foundation (BREEF), which transformed local attitudes to maritime conservation.

=== Post 1976 ===
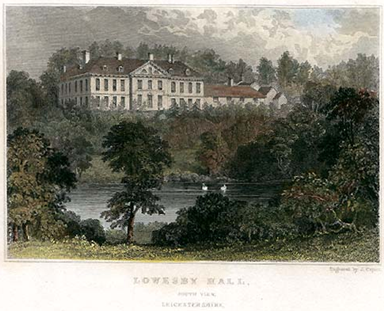
Lowesby Hall, Leicestershire, south view, drawn by John Preston Neale (1780–1847), engraved by J. Capon, published in Neale's "Views of Seats", c.1830

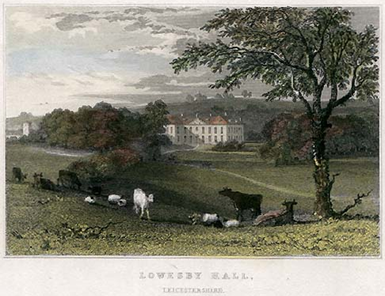
Lowesby Hall, Leicestershire, drawn by John Preston Neale, engraved by J. Capon, published in Neale's "Views of Seats", c. 1830

As of 2012 the house remains in private ownership of the property developer and house builder David William Wilson (born 1941) formerly Chairman of Wilson Bowden Plc, which operated chiefly in Leicestershire. In 2007 Wilson Bowden was sold to Barratt Developments for £2.2 billion, of which £700 million went to David William Wilson for his 33% stake, £300 million in cash and £400 million in Barratt shares, which "went through the floor", being valued at £17 million in 2013, and leaving him with a fortune estimated at £375m in 2013. He is a significant philanthropist and through his charity the David Wilson Foundation has been a leading donor to the University of Leicester's £12.6 million heart research centre at Glenfield Hospital. He is married with 4 children.
