= Nuttall =

Nuttall may refer to:

== People ==
- Nuttall (name)
- Nuttall baronets

== Nature ==
- Nuttall's oak, a fast-growing large deciduous oak tree native to North America
- Nuttall's woodpecker, a species of woodpecker found in oak woodlands of California
- Nuttall sandstone, a very hard type of sandstone; see New River Gorge National River
- Nuttall's toothwort, a species of cardamine flower.

== Places ==
- Nuttall, Virginia, United States
- Nuttall railway station, Nuttall village, Nasirabad, Balochistan, Pakistan
- Nuttall mountains, hills that are over 2,000 ft (610 m) with a prominence above 15 m (49 ft):
  - List of Nuttall mountains in England
  - List of Nuttall mountains in Wales

== Other uses ==
- BAM Nuttall, a British construction company
- Blackman–Nuttall window, a mathematical function used in signal processing—see Window function
- Codex Zouche-Nuttall, a pre-Columbian piece of Mixtec writing
- Geiger–Nuttall law, a rule in nuclear physics stating that short-lived isotopes emit more energetic alpha particles than long-lived ones
- Nuttall Ornithological Club, the oldest ornithology organization in United States
- The Nuttall Encyclopædia, an early 20th-century encyclopedia
- Thomas “Tom” Nuttall, a saloon owner in the TV series Deadwood, portrayed by Leon Rippy
