= Peter Singer (judge) =

British High Court judge

Sir Jan Peter Singer (10 September 1944 – 22 December 2018) was a judge of the High Court of England and Wales.

== Education ==
Singer was educated at King Edward's School, Birmingham, then at Selwyn College, Cambridge.

== Career ==
Singer was a judge in the High Court of Justice, Family Division, from 1993 to 2010. After his retirement from the bench, he acted as an independent mediator and advocate consultant at No. 1 Hare Court — his former chambers.

He was called to the Bar at the Inner Temple in 1967, becoming a Queen's Counsel in 1987. He was a Recorder between 1987 and 1993. He was Chairman of the Family Law Bar Association between 1990 and 92. Member, Matrimonial Causes Rule Committee 1981-85. Senate of Inns of Court and Bar 1983-6; Law Society Legal Aid Committee 1984-89; General Council of the Bar 1990-92. Vice-President, European Chapter, International Academy of Matrimonial Lawyers 1992-93.

He died on 22 December 2018 at the age of 74.

== The Al Farargy matter - the recusal appeal ==
On 15 November 2007 the Court of Appeal gave reasons for having allowed an appeal from Mr Justice Singer's refusal to recuse himself from hearing a hotly contested matrimonial finance case. The application that he should withdraw from further participation in the matter arose because the judge had made a number of jokes about one of the parties in the case, Sheikh Khalid Ben Abdfullah Rashid Alfawaz. They included the observations

— That the sheikh could choose “to depart on his flying carpet” to escape paying costs

— That the sheikh should be available to attend hearings “at this relatively fast-free time of the year”

— That he should be in court so that “every grain of sand is sifted”

— And that the sheikh’s evidence was “a bit gelatinous . . . like Turkish Delight”.

In his judgment in the Court of Appeal Lord Justice Ward (sitting with Lord Justice Mummery and Lord Justice Wilson) said, of the remarks complained of, that:

Unfortunately, every one of the four remarks can be seen to be not simply "colourful language" as the judge sought to excuse them but, to adopt [counsel's] submission, to be mocking and disparaging of the third respondent for his status as a Sheikh and/or his Saudi nationality and/or his ethnic origins and/or his Muslim faith

In a statement after the judgment, issued on his behalf by the Judicial Communications Office, the judge said: “I wish publicly to apologise to Sheikh Khalid Ben Abdfullah Rashid Alfawaz for these remarks. My comments were poorly chosen. They were not intended to be racist, nor have I ever intended any disrespect or disregard for the tenets of Islam, or for the sheikh’s Saudi nationality and Arab ethnicity. My judicial work and public speeches clearly demonstrate that I am in no sense racist. ... I did attempt to arrange for the final hearing to be conducted by one of my colleagues, but the workload on the Family Division of the High Court and the judicial resources available to us did not permit this if a long postponement of the final hearing was to be avoided. Clearly though this does not excuse the way I expressed myself”

== The Cunningham appeal ==
Birgit Cunningham who had an affair with Harry Nuttall asked the CSA for a child support review, but Nuttall then claimed to have no income at all, and the payments of £5.40 ended. A claim in the family division of the High Court failed to award any child support, after the judge, Justice Singer, had asked "Do you seriously expect Mr Nuttall to sell his shooting rifles for child maintenance?"

== Editor ==
- Joint editor, Rayden on Divorce, 14th Ed., 1983.
- Joint editor, At a Glance, annually, 1992-.
- Consulting editor, Essential Family Practice 2000.

== Family ==
He has a daughter, Laura (born 1973) and a son, Luke (born 1975).
