= Frederick Fowke =

Frederick Fowke may refer to:

- Frederick Luther Fowke (1857–1939), merchant and political figure in Ontario, Canada
- Sir Frederick Gustavus Fowke, 1st Baronet (1782–1856), of the Fowke baronets
- Sir Frederick Thomas Fowke, 2nd Baronet (1816–1897), of the Fowke baronets
- Sir Frederick Ferrers Conant Fowke, 3rd Baronet (1879–1948), of the Fowke baronets
- Sir Frederick Woollaston Rawdon Fowke, 4th Baronet (1910–1987), of the Fowke baronets

== See also ==
- Fowke (surname)
