= Nuthall (surname) =

Nuthall is a surname. Notable people with the surname include:

- Betty Nuthall (1911–1983), English tennis player
- Matthew Nuthall (born 1983), Welsh rugby union player
- Thomas Nuthall (died 1775), English politician and lawyer

== See also ==
- Nuttall (name)
