= Christopher York =

British Conservative politician (1909–1999)

Major Christopher York
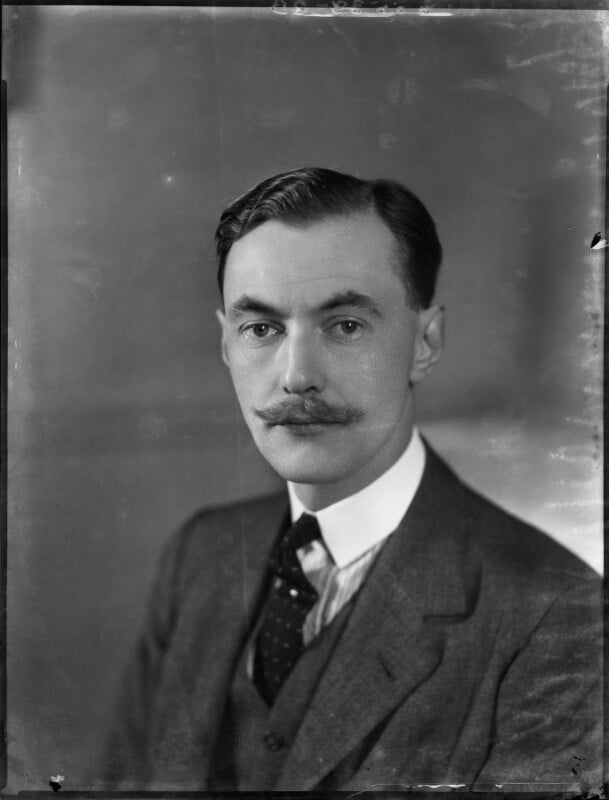
- York in 1939
- Born: 27 July 1909; England
- Died: 13 March 1999 (aged 89)
- Occupations: Politician and High Sheriff of Yorkshire
- Parent(s): Captain Edward York and his wife, Violet Helen
- Relatives: Rosemary Caroline (daughter), Harry Nuttall (grandson) and Tamara Nuttall (granddaughter)

Major Christopher York (27 July 1909 – 13 March 1999) was a British Conservative politician.

York was the eldest son of Captain Edward York and his wife, Violet Helen née Milner, daughter of Sir Frederick Milner, 7th Baronet. He was member of parliament (MP) for Ripon from 1939 to 1950, and for Harrogate from 1950 until his resignation in 1954.

In 1966 he served as High Sheriff of Yorkshire.

His daughter Rosemary Caroline (1934–2007) married Sir Nicholas Nuttall in 1960 and was the mother of the racing driver Harry Nuttall (born 1963) and of Tamara Nuttall (1967–1997).

== Sources ==
- Leigh Rayment's Historical List of MPs

Parliament of the United Kingdom
Preceded by John Hills	Member of Parliament for Ripon; 1939 – 1950	Succeeded by Sir Malcolm Stoddart-Scott
New constituency	Member of Parliament for Harrogate; 1950 – 1954	Succeeded by James Ramsden
