= Robert Banks (politician) =

British politician

Robert George Banks (born 18 January 1937) is a Conservative Party politician in the United Kingdom. He was member of parliament for Harrogate from February 1974 until he retired in May 1997.

Parliament of the United Kingdom
Preceded by James Ramsden	Member of Parliament for Harrogate; Feb 1974–1997	Succeeded by Phil Willis
