= Nicholas Nuttall =

Heir to the Edmund Nuttall construction and civil engineering business (1933-2007)

Sir Nicholas Keith Lillington Nuttall 3rd Baronet
- Born: 21 September 1933; Leicestershire, England
- Died: 29 July 2007 (aged 73)
- Education: Eton College
- Alma mater: Royal Military Academy Sandhurst
- Spouse(s): Caroline York (m. 1960; div. 1971) Julia Williamson Miranda Quarry (m. 1995) Eugenie McWeeney
- Children: 7
- Father: Sir Keith Nuttall
- Relatives: Sir Edmund Nuttall, 1st Baronet (paternal grandfather); Harry Nuttall (son)
- Military career
- Allegiance: United Kingdom
- Branch: British Army
- Service years: 1953-68
- Rank: Major
- Unit: Royal Horse Guards
- Commands: Guards Independent Parachute Regiment
- Conflicts: Cyprus Emergency

Sir Nicholas Keith Lillington Nuttall, 3rd Baronet (21 September 1933 – 29 July 2007) was the heir to the Edmund Nuttall construction and civil engineering business. He also inherited the Nuttall baronetcy on his father's death in 1941, when he was eight years old. After a career in the British Army, he sold the family company in 1978 and emigrated to the Bahamas, where he became involved in marine conservation.

== Background ==
Nuttall was born in Leicestershire, the son of Sir Keith Nuttall, 2nd Baronet (1901–1941), who ran the family engineering business, Edmund Nuttall, Sons & Co. Ltd, in the 1920s and 1930s. The business had been founded by Nuttall's great-grandfather James Nuttall in Manchester in 1865, and built into a nationwide business by Nuttall's grandfather, Sir Edmund Nuttall, 1st Baronet (1870–1923), who became a baronet in 1922.

Nuttall's father became a lieutenant colonel in the Royal Engineers in the Second World War. Wounded in the retreat to Dunkirk, Sir Keith died on 31 August 1941; his eight-year-old son, Nicholas, inherited the title, the family company, and the family seat at Lowesby Hall near Melton Mowbray in Leicestershire. His mother remarried, becoming Mrs Edward Kirkpatrick.

== Career ==
Sir Nicholas was educated at Eton College and Sandhurst, and took a commission in the Royal Horse Guards in 1953. He played polo, and was an amateur jockey. On his own horse, Stalbridge Park, he won the Grand Military Gold Cup at Sandown Park in 1958, came second in 1959, then third in 1960, won again in 1961, and came second another time in 1962. He served in Cyprus during the Cyprus Emergency. By 1966, he was a major, in command of the Guards Independent Parachute Regiment. He resigned his commission in 1968, on the death of his mother, to take over the family firm. He held a party at Lowesby Hall in 1959, to celebrate the restoration of a painted ceiling by Antonio Verrio, and held a dance in tents at Lowesby in 1976, shortly before it was sold, emulating a party held by the Shah of Iran in the desert in 1972.

Nuttall supported the Labour government's Channel Tunnel project in the 1970s. The company was later involved in the construction of High Speed 1. The company was bought by Hollandsche Beton Groep (later HBG), a Dutch group, in 1978, and he emigrated shortly afterwards with his third wife, Miranda, moving to Lyford Cay, near Nassau, Bahamas, on New Providence there, although he kept a house in Chelsea. He became involved in marine conservation and founded the Bahamas Reef Environmental Educational Foundation (BREEF), almost single-handedly transforming local attitudes to maritime conservation. The Nassau Guardian lauded him after his death as a "prominent local environmentalist... at the forefront of a number of important marine conservation initiatives and environmental causes".

== Family life ==
Nuttall married four times.

1. Caroline York, daughter of former Conservative Party MP Christopher York, on 20 December 1960. They had one son, Harry, and a daughter, Tamara; and divorced in 1971.
2. Julia Williamson, formerly Lady Patrick Beresford, daughter of Col. Thomas Cromwell Williamson, D.S.O., of Thorpe-le-Soken, Essex. Lord Patrick Beresford had been Sir Nicholas's best man at his first wedding. Lord Patrick and his wife Julia (married 1964, divorced 1971) had issue: Valentine Tristram Beresford, (b. 1965) and Samantha Julia Beresford, (b. 1969).
3. Miranda Quarry (stepdaughter of the 2nd Baron Mancroft and third wife of Peter Sellers; later second wife of the 2nd Earl of Stockton); they had three daughters: Gytha, Amber and Olympia (Amber married Alistair Gosling in December 2016).
4. Eugenie McWeeney, from Bahamas, clothing designer and sister of former Attorney-General of The Bahamas, Sean McWeeney, QC; they had a son, Alexander. From 2010 to 2014, she was in a relationship with Norton Knatchbull, 3rd Earl Mountbatten of Burma.

== Death ==
He died of lung cancer. He was succeeded in the baronetcy by Harry, his son from his first marriage.

== Notes ==
Baronetage of the United Kingdom
Preceded by Keith Nuttall	Baronet (of Chasefield); 1941–2007	Succeeded by Harry Nuttall
