= 1954 Harrogate by-election =

UK Parliamentary by-election

The 1954 Harrogate by-election was held on 11 March 1954. It was caused by the resignation of the incumbent Conservative MP, Christopher York. It was won by the Conservative candidate James Ramsden.

By Election March 1954: Harrogate
Party	Candidate	Votes	%	±%
Conservative	James Ramsden	20,263	70.78	+0.22
Labour	E. Kavanagh	8,367	29.22	−0.22
Majority		11,896	41.56	+0.45
Turnout		28,630		
Conservative hold		Swing		
