= Woollaston baronets =

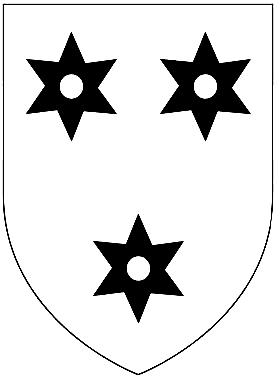
Arms of Wollaston: Argent, three mullets sable pierced of the field

The Lawrence (later Woollaston, or Wollaston) baronetcy, of Loseby (i.e. Lowesby Hall) in the County of Leicester, was a title in the Baronetage of Great Britain. It was created on 17 January 1748 for Edward Lawrence, Esq. (died 1749), with remainder to his great-nephew, Isaac Woollaston (d. 1750) of Lowesby Hall, Leicestershire. Lawrence was MP for Stockbridge. He died in 1749 and was succeeded according to the special remainder by his great-nephew, Isaac Woollaston (died 1750), the second baronet. He was the grandson of Josiah Woollaston (1652–1689) by his wife Elizabeth Lawrence, sister of the first baronet. The title became extinct on the death of the second baronet's son, the third baronet, who died as a child in 1756.

== Lawrence (later Woollaston) baronets, of Loseby (1748) ==
- Sir Edward Lawrence, 1st Baronet (by 1674–1749)
- Sir Isaac Woollaston, 2nd Baronet (died 1750)
- Sir Isaac Lawrence Woollaston, 3rd Baronet (died 1756)

== Sources ==
- Burke, John. A Genealogical and Heraldic History of the Extinct and Dormant Baronetcies of England, p. 577.

Baronetage of Great Britain
Preceded by Williams baronets	Lawrence baronets of Loseby; 17 January 1748	Succeeded by Ibbetson baronets
