= James Ramsden (politician) =

British politician (1923–2020)

The Right Honourable James Ramsden

Minister of State for the Army
- In office 1 April 1964 – 16 October 1964
- Prime Minister: Sir Alec Douglas-Home
- Preceded by: Office created
- Succeeded by: Fred Mulley

Secretary of State for War
- In office 21 October 1963 – 1 April 1964
- Monarch: Elizabeth II
- Prime Minister: Sir Alec Douglas-Home
- Preceded by: Joseph Godber
- Succeeded by: Office abolished

Member of Parliament for Harrogate
- In office 11 March 1954 – 8 February 1974
- Preceded by: Christopher York
- Succeeded by: Robert Banks

Personal details
- Born: James Edward Ramsden; 1 November 1923 Liverpool, England
- Died: 29 March 2020 (aged 96) Ripon, England
- Party: Conservative
- Spouse: Juliet Ponsonby
- Military career
- Allegiance: United Kingdom
- Branch: British Army
- Service years: 1942–1951
- Rank: Lieutenant
- Service number: 256071
- Unit: King's Royal Rifle Corps
- Conflicts: Second World War

James Edward Ramsden PC (1 November 1923 – 29 March 2020) was a British Conservative politician. He was the last person to hold the office of Secretary of State for War.

== Background ==
Ramsden was born in Liverpool in 1923, the son of Captain Edward Ramsden and his wife Geraldine. His father was a brother of George Taylor Ramsden, a Coalition Unionist MP for Elland, while his mother was a sister of brothers Sir Frank O'Brien Wilson (a Royal Navy officer and early settler of Kenya) and Sir Murrough John Wilson (a Conservative MP for Richmond, Yorkshire). During the Second World War, he served as a lieutenant with the King's Royal Rifle Corps.

== Political career ==
Ramsden sat as member of parliament for Harrogate from 1954 to 1974. He served under Harold Macmillan as Under-Secretary of State and Financial Secretary for War from 1960 to 1963 and under Sir Alec Douglas-Home as Secretary of State for War from 1963 to 1964. At the April 1964 reshuffle, the former cabinet positions of First Lord of the Admiralty and Secretary of State for Air, along with Ramsden's post, were incorporated into an expanded Ministry of Defence, under the leadership of the new position of Secretary of State for Defence. Ramsden was appointed Minister of State for the Army at the Ministry of Defence, a post he held until the Douglas-Home government fell in October 1964. He was sworn in as a member of the Privy Council in 1963.

Ramsden was interviewed in 2012 as part of The History of Parliament's oral history project.

== Personal life ==
Ramsden married Juliet Ponsonby, daughter of Conservative politician Charles Ponsonby. Their youngest child was the artist Charlotte Cheverton, who died in a car accident in 1991.

Ramsden died in March 2020 at the age of 96.

Parliament of the United Kingdom
Preceded by Christopher York	Member of Parliament for Harrogate; 1954 – February 1974	Succeeded by Robert Banks
Political offices
Preceded by Hon. Hugh Fraser	Under-Secretary of State and Financial Secretary for War; 1960–1963	Succeeded by Peter Kirk
Preceded by Joseph Godber	Secretary of State for War; 1963–1964	Office abolished
New office	Minister of State for the Army; 1964	Succeeded by Fred Mulley
