= Harrogate (constituency) =

Parliamentary constituency in the United Kingdom, 1950–1997

- Former county constituency for the House of Commons
- County: North Yorkshire
- Major settlements: Harrogate and Knaresborough

1950–1997
- Seats: One
- Created from: Ripon
- Replaced by: Harrogate and Knaresborough

Harrogate (/ˈhærəɡət, -ɡeɪt, -ɡɪt/ HARR-ə-gət, -gayt, -ghit) was a constituency (Note: A borough constituency (for the purposes of election expenses and type of returning officer)) represented in the House of Commons of the UK Parliament. As with all constituencies, the constituency elected one Member of Parliament (MP) by the first past the post system of election. The constituency was renamed Harrogate and Knaresborough in 1997.

== Constituency profile ==
The seat covered an area with little unemployment, a relatively large retired population and large neighbourhoods of high house prices. (Note: In the 2001 census: worklessness was the status of (see Harrogate 009 Middle Layer SOA for access to the whole district): 1.0% of working age people compared to Yorkshire and the Humber: 2.6% England 2.3% However in the 2001 Census publication "Indices of Deprivation and Classification: Social Grade" 0.27% of the wider District population of 69,614 of working age were Class E: On state benefit, unemployed, lowest grade workers, slightly higher than 0.22% Yorkshire and the Humber average and 0.24% national average) Until former Chancellor Norman Lamont stood for the first time in the successor seat in the New Labour landslide general election in 1997, it had been part of a Conservative safe seat since 1910. However, Harrogate moved the way of other famous spa towns in England, such as Bath (Note: And for example more urban and less touristic Cheltenham, which is in the Gloucester conurbation) by returning a Liberal Democrat MP.

== Boundaries ==
1950–1983: The Municipal Borough of Harrogate, the Urban District of Knaresborough, and the Rural District of Nidderdale except the parishes of Hessay, Knapton, Moor Monkton, Nether Poppleton, Rufforth, and Upper Poppleton.

1983–1997: The Borough of Harrogate wards of Bilton, Claro, Duchy, East Central, Granby, Harlow, Knaresborough East, Knaresborough West, Marston Moor, Nether Poppleton, New Park, Ouseburn, Pannal, Spofforth, Starbeck, Upper Poppleton, Wedderburn, and West Central.

== History ==
Before 1950 Harrogate had been part of the Ripon constituency. The constituency was created as 'Harrogate' and following boundary changes in 1997 the name was changed to Harrogate and Knaresborough.

== Members of Parliament ==
Election	Member	Party	Notes
1950	Christopher York	Conservative	Resigned February 1954
1954 by-election	James Ramsden	Conservative	
Feb 1974	Robert Banks	Conservative	

== Election results ==
=== Elections in the 1950s ===
General election 1950: Harrogate
Party	Candidate	Votes	%	±%
Conservative	Christopher York	28,582	68.55	
Labour	Edward J. Parris	13,114	31.45	
Majority		15,468	37.10	
Turnout		41,696	81.24	
Conservative win (new seat)				

General election 1951: Harrogate
Party	Candidate	Votes	%	±%
Conservative	Christopher York	28,806	70.56	
Labour	Christopher William Sewell	12,021	29.44	
Majority		16,785	41.12	
Turnout		40,827	78.74	
Conservative hold		Swing		

1954 Harrogate by-election
Party	Candidate	Votes	%	±%
Conservative	James Ramsden	20,263	70.78	+0.22
Labour	Ernest Kavanagh	8,367	29.22	−0.22
Majority		11,896	41.56	+0.44
Turnout		28,630		
Conservative hold		Swing		

General election 1955: Harrogate
Party	Candidate	Votes	%	±%
Conservative	James Ramsden	26,799	72.32	
Labour	Thomas Evers	10,258	27.68	
Majority		16,541	44.64	
Turnout		37,057	71.86	
Conservative hold		Swing		

General election 1959: Harrogate
Party	Candidate	Votes	%	±%
Conservative	James Ramsden	29,466	74.29	
Labour	Frederick Bernard Singleton	10,196	25.71	
Majority		19,270	48.58	
Turnout		39,662	74.49	
Conservative hold		Swing		

=== Elections in the 1960s ===
General election 1964: Harrogate
Party	Candidate	Votes	%	±%
Conservative	James Ramsden	24,474	57.64	
Liberal	Barrington Malcolm Black	9,332	21.98	New
Labour	Edward Lyons	8,655	20.38	
Majority		15,142	35.66	
Turnout		42,461	77.00	
Conservative hold		Swing		

General election 1966: Harrogate
Party	Candidate	Votes	%	±%
Conservative	James Ramsden	22,932	54.97	
Liberal	Walter Greaves	9,518	22.82	
Labour	Reginald Ernest Holmes	9,267	22.21	
Majority		13,414	32.15	
Turnout		41,717	74.47	
Conservative hold		Swing		

=== Elections in the 1970s ===
General election 1970: Harrogate
Party	Candidate	Votes	%	±%
Conservative	James Ramsden	26,167	59.76	
Liberal	Walter Greaves	8,825	20.15	
Labour	Brian Hellowell	8,797	20.09	
Majority		17,342	39.61	
Turnout		43,789	69.93	
Conservative hold		Swing		

General election February 1974: Harrogate
Party	Candidate	Votes	%	±%
Conservative	Robert Banks	27,517	53.55	
Liberal	Ian DeCourcey Bayley	15,728	30.61	
Labour	Michael A. Wheaton	6,084	11.84	
National Front	Andrew Brons	1,186	2.31	New
Democratic Christian	J. E. Stringfellow	875	1.70	New
Majority		11,789	22.94	
Turnout		51,390	80.05	
Conservative hold		Swing		

General election October 1974: Harrogate
Party	Candidate	Votes	%	±%
Conservative	Robert Banks	24,583	53.85	
Liberal	Ian DeCourcey Bayley	11,269	24.69	
Labour	Barry Seal	8,047	17.63	
National Front	Andrew Brons	1,030	2.26	
Whig	Cecil Margolis	719	1.58	New
Majority		13,314	29.17	
Turnout		45,648	70.49	
Conservative hold		Swing		

General election 1979: Harrogate
Party	Candidate	Votes	%	±%
Conservative	Robert Banks	30,551	59.46	
Liberal	Rodney Kent	12,021	23.40	
Labour	A. Fleming	8,221	16.00	
National Front	D. Waite	585	1.14	
Majority		18,530	36.06	
Turnout		51,378	74.26	
Conservative hold		Swing		

=== Elections in the 1980s ===
General election 1983: Harrogate
Party	Candidate	Votes	%	±%
Conservative	Robert Banks	30,269	60.23	
SDP	John Burney	14,381	28.62	
Labour	John Dixon	5,128	10.20	
Reintroduction of Hanging and Corporal Punishment	D. Kelley	316	0.63	New
National Front	P. Vessey	163	0.32	
Majority		15,888	31.61	
Turnout		50,257	69.02	
Conservative hold		Swing		

General election 1987: Harrogate
Party	Candidate	Votes	%	±%
Conservative	Robert Banks	31,167	55.55	
SDP	Jonathan Leach	19,265	34.34	
Labour	Andrew Wright	5,671	10.10	
Majority		11,902	21.21	
Turnout		56,103	74.05	
Conservative hold		Swing		

=== Elections in the 1990s ===
General election 1992: Harrogate
Party	Candidate	Votes	%	±%
Conservative	Robert Banks	32,023	53.85	
Liberal Democrats	T. J. Hurren	19,434	32.68	
Labour	A. J. Wright	7,230	12.16	
Green	Arnold Warneken	780	1.31	New
Majority		12,589	21.17	
Turnout		59,467	77.99	
Conservative hold		Swing		

== See also ==
- List of parliamentary constituencies in North Yorkshire

== Notes and references ==
Notes
