= Higgs and Hill =

British construction company

- Industry: Construction
- Founded: 1874
- Defunct: 1996
- Fate: Acquired
- Successor: BAM Construction
- Headquarters: New Malden, UK
- Key people: George Duncan, (Chairman); John Theakston, (CEO)
- Number of employees: circa 1,000

Higgs and Hill was a major British construction company responsible for construction of many well-known buildings in London. It was acquired by Hollandsche Beton Groep (later HBG) in 1996, was rebranded as HBG Construction in 1999 and was absorbed into Royal BAM Group in 2002.

== History ==
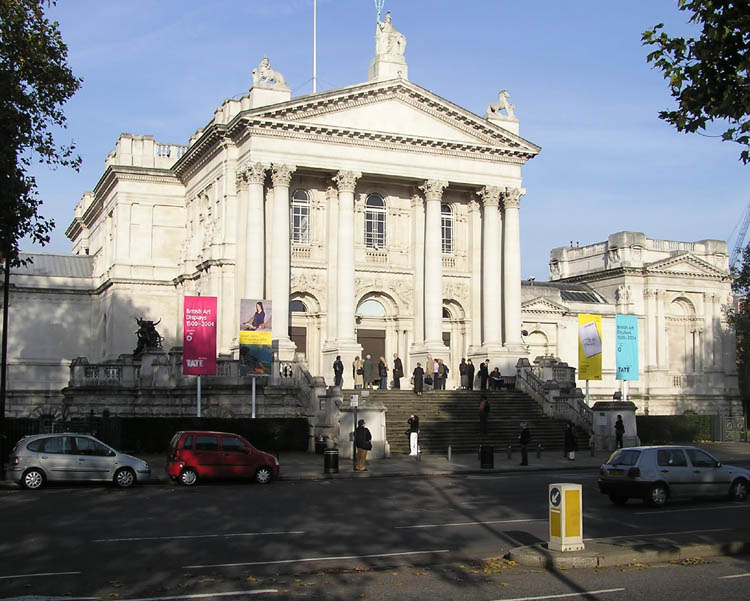
The Tate Gallery built by Higgs and Hill

The company was established in 1874 by the merger of the firm of Thomas Hill (managed by Rowland and Joseph Hill, grandsons of the founder) with the firm of William Higgs. It was originally called Hill, Higgs and Hill but changed its name to Higgs and Hill when Rowland Hill retired in 1879. The company was first based at Crown Works in Vauxhall but moved to New Malden in 1967.

Sir Brian Hill, a member of the seventh generation of his family to work in the business, retired in 1992. In 1994 it announced a rights issue to finance the acquisition of land for housing but the issue was not well subscribed.

In 1996 the company announced poor results arising from re-organisation charges and contract losses. The company was acquired by Hollandsche Beton Groep (later HBG) later that year, and was rebranded as HBG Construction with effect from 1 January 1999. HBG was itself acquired by Royal BAM Group in 2002.

== Major projects ==
Major projects undertaken by the company included:

- Harvey Nichols in Knightsbridge, completed in 1880
- Surrey County Hall, completed in 1893
- the Tate Gallery, completed in 1897
- the Royal Naval College, Dartmouth, completed in 1905
- the London Fire Brigade Headquarters, completed in 1937
- the North and South Blocks of London County Hall, completed in 1939
- the BBC Television Centre, completed in 1960
- the Queen Elizabeth Hall, completed in 1967
- the Hayward Gallery completed in 1968
- the South Bank Television Centre, completed in 1972
- Hillingdon Civic Centre completed in 1979
- Lord's Cricket Ground Mound Stand, completed in 1987
- the restoration of Windsor Castle, completed in 1996
