= 1939 Ripon by-election =

UK parliamentary by-election

The 1939 Ripon by-election was a parliamentary by-election held in the United Kingdom on 23 February 1939 for the House of Commons constituency of Ripon in the West Riding of Yorkshire.

== Previous MP ==
The by-election was caused by the death of Major John Waller Hills, who was elected to the constituency in 1935.

== Previous Result ==
General election, 14 November 1935
Party	Candidate	Votes	%	±%
Conservative	John Waller Hills	30,804	78.6	
Labour	R. J. Hall	9,116	21.4	
Majority		21,688	57.2	
Turnout		39,200		
Conservative hold		Swing		

== Result ==
Only two candidates contested the seat; Christopher York and R. J. Hall. The Conservative Party held the seat.

Ripon By-Election, 1939
Party	Candidate	Votes	%	±%
Conservative	Christopher York	23,257	69.5	
Labour	R. J. Hall	10,213	30.5	
Majority		13,044	39.0	
Turnout		33,470		
Conservative hold		Swing		

== Aftermath ==
In the 1945 general election, the Conservatives continued holding the seat.

General election, 5 July 1945
Party	Candidate	Votes	%	±%
Conservative	Christopher York	29,674	61.3	−15.9
Labour	R. Hartley	12,599	26.0	+3.2
Liberal	M. Cowley	6,122	12.7	New
Majority		17,075	35.3	−19.0
Turnout		48,395	69.8	+1.2
Conservative hold		Swing		
