= Bahamas Reef Environmental Educational Foundation =

- Sergeant major fish logo
- Founded: 1993
- Founder: Sir Nicholas Nuttall
- Type: Non-governmental
- Location: Nassau, Bahamas
- Methods: Education, advocacy
- Fields: Marine conservation

The Bahamas Reef Environmental Educational Foundation (BREEF) is a non-government, not-for-profit organisation in the Bahamas devoted to the conservation of the marine environment. It campaigns to preserve the coral reef ecosystems in the seas around the Bahamas, to protect local fishing grounds, and is also involved in education. Based in Nassau, it was founded by Sir Nicholas Nuttall, 3rd Baronet in 1993 as a voluntary organisation. Its first executive director was hired in 2002.

BREEF initially focused on educating Bahamians about the country's natural resources, but later took on an active role as a watchdog and political advocacy group, transitioning from a voluntary organisation to a more formalised non-government organisation. Its primary activities are community outreach, government and civil society partnerships, and educational programmes.

The organisation raises awareness about the importance of coral reefs, seagrass beds, mangroves and other marine ecosystems through initiatives like the Coral Reef Sculpture Garden. They also train marine science teachers.

BREEF is the national operator for the Young Reporters for the Environment programme for the Bahamas. BREEF organises the Extreme Hangout Bahamas, an annual two-day youth climate action summit.
