= Royal Artillery Gold Cup =

Steeplechase horse race in Britain

The Royal Artillery Gold Cup is a National Hunt steeplechase in Britain which is open to horses aged six years or older. It is run at Sandown Park over a distance of about 3 miles (3 miles and 37 yards, or 4,862 metres) and during the race there are 22 fences to be jumped. It is scheduled to take place each year in February.

The race was first run in 1863, took place at Sandown Park for the first time in 1878 and has been run there continuously since 1921. Runners in the race have to be owned or leased by serving or past members of the Royal Artillery and must be ridden by serving or past members of the British Armed Forces. A similar race, the Grand Military Gold Cup, takes place at Sandown Park in January. Captain Guy Disney's victory on Rathlin Rose in 2017 was the first race win by an amputee rider at a British racecourse.

== Winners ==
| Year | Winner | Age | Jockey | Trainer |
|---|---|---|---|---|
| 1863 | Chickahominy | | Captain J Ruck-Keene |
| 1864 | Ubique | | Captain Markham |
| 1865 | Jim Crow | | Mr Callow |
| 1866 | Oldcastle | | Mr Griffiths |
| 1867 | Vesta | | Mr Magenis |
| 1868 | Clinker | | Captain Izod |
| 1869 | Conjuror | | Mr H Browne |
| 1870 | Conjuror | | Mr H Browne |
| 1871 | Jerome | | Mr H Browne |
| 1872 | Jerome | | Mr H Browne |
| 1873 | Whitchurch | | Mr Annesley |
| 1874 | The Poet | | Mr H Browne |
| 1875 | Outpost | | Mr H S Dalbiac |
| 1876 | Strike | | Mr French |
| 1877 | Moatlands | | Mr H S Dalbiac |
| 1878 | Swift | | Mr H S Dalbiac |
| 1879 | Extinguisher | | Mr H S Dalbiac |
| 1880 | Fiddlestick | | Mr H S Dalbiac |
| 1881 | Grateful | | Captain Beaver |
| 1882 | La Mienne | | Mr Murphy |
| 1883 | Abandoned |
| 1884 | Bear II | | Mr Tylden |
| 1885 | Damasel | | Captain Barry |
| 1886 | Johnny Longtail | | Mr Beever |
| 1887 | Great Paul | | Mr Beever |
| 1888 | Wallace | | Captain Russell |
| 1889 | Mazzard | | Mr Beever |
| 1890 | Abandoned |
| | no race 1891 |
| 1892 | Rocket | | Mr Blacker |
| 1893 | Eclipse | | Captain A King |
| 1894 | Pather Pat | | Mr O'Connor |
| 1895 | Lincoln Lad | | Mr E J R Peel |
| 1896 | Honour Oak | | Mr J F Lamont |
| 1897 | Princess Clare | | Captain Ferrar |
| 1898 | unnamed | aged | Mr Vanua Lava |
| 1899 | Lady Henbury | aged | Mr H H Tudor |
| | no race 1900-02 |
| 1903 | Comrade II | aged | Mr Mayall |
| 1904 | Canonesse II | aged | Mr Kingsley Willett |
| 1905 | Beloved | aged | Captain G Hankey |
| 1906 | Downpatrick II | aged | Mr H P Burnycat |
| 1907 | Irish Wisdom | 5 | Mr M McGillycuddy | J Swatton |
| 1908 | Foolhardy | aged | Mr M McGillycuddy |
| 1909 | Hebe | 6 | Mr A P Heneage | J Powney |
| 1910 | Anndorra | aged | Mr C T Walwyn |
| 1911 | Ruby Light | aged | Mr K Parbury |
| 1912 | Ruby Light | aged | Mr K Parbury | Captain Lindsay |
| 1913 | St James's Park | aged | Mr E C Anstey |
| 1914 | Shanecracken | 6 | Mr H McMaster |
| | no race 1915-19 |
| 1920 | Curraghgour | 9 | Captain N H Huttenbach |
| 1921 | Caradoc II | aged | Lieutenant Colonel J H Gibbon | Lieutenant Colonel J H Gibbon |
| 1922 | Caradoc II | aged | Lieutenant Colonel J H Gibbon | Lieutenant Colonel J H Gibbon |
| 1923 | Clonhugh | 11 | Major C T Walwyn | J Nightingall |
| 1924 | Laddoux | 9 | Captain H B Latham |
| 1925 | Speedy Minstrel | 11 | Mr H Lumsden | Powell |
| 1926 | Snapper | 8 | Major T Cavanagh | P Woodland |
| 1927 | Snapper | 9 | Captain M Dennis | P Woodland |
| 1928 | Drintyre | 5 | Mr C N Brownhill | C N Brownhill |
| 1929 | St Roy | 5 | Captain M Dennis | P Woodland |
| 1930 | Pride Of The Morning | 10 | Captain M Dennis | E Steddall |
| 1931 | Gunner L | aged | Mr A D M Teacher | R Payne |
| 1932 | Pay Day | 6 | Captain W A Sheil | Captain W A Sheil |
| 1933 | Swansdown | 8 | Mr P Gregson | C H P Crawford |
| 1934 | Riposte | 6 | Mr R B T Daniell | E Steddall |
| 1935 | Gold Cup | 6 | Captain H C Phillips | P Nunneley |
| 1936 | Applaud | 7 | Mr W R Holman | Mr W R Holman |
| 1937 | March Brown IV | 8 | Mr W Scott Plummer | C Murless |
| 1938 | Distant Horizon | 7 | Captain H C Phillips | W Lyde |
| 1939 | Applaud | 10 | Mr W R Holman | Mr W R Holman |
| | no race 1940-48 |
| 1949 | Flaming Way | 9 | Brigadier B J Fowler | Brigadier B J Fowler |
| 1950 | Golden Plover II | 8 | Lieutenant Colonel W Holman | Major C Armitage |
| 1951 | Silverland | 6 | Lieutenant Colonel John Mead | Lieutenant Colonel John Mead |
| 1952 | Abandoned due to snow |
| 1953 | Moonlight III | 9 | Major Tim Palmer | T C Palmer |
| 1954 | Moonlight III | 10 | Major Tim Palmer | Major Tim Palmer |
| 1955 | Barber's Tale | 10 | Bill Tellwright | Bill Tellwright |
| 1956 | Snowshill Jim | 7 | Lieutenant Colonel Frank Weldon | Lieutenant Colonel Frank Weldon |
| 1957 | Snowshill Jim | 8 | Lieutenant Colonel Frank Weldon | Lieutenant Colonel Frank Weldon |
| 1958 | Spittal Hill | 7 | D Thatcher | Major R L Spiller |
| 1959 | Sunton Heath | 12 | Major George Oakford | Major George Oakford |
| 1960 | William Pitt | 12 | Major Frederick Taylor | Major Frederick Taylor |
| 1961 | William Pitt | 13 | Major Frederick Taylor | Major Frederick Taylor |
| 1962 | Pax Vobis | 10 | Captain James Templer | Brigadier M S K Maunsell |
| 1963 | Pax Vobis | 11 | Captain James Templer | Brigadier M S K Maunsell |
| 1964 | Sunsketch | 8 | Captain Franey Matthews | Captain Franey Matthews |
| 1965 | Ringer | 6 | Richard Vines | Arthur Stephenson |
| 1966 | Trunk Call | 9 | Bill Tellwright | Bill Tellwright |
| 1967 | Sunsketch | 11 | Captain Franey Matthews | Captain Franey Matthews |
| 1968 | Rosie's Cousin | 14 | John Mead | Major Harold Rushton |
| 1969 | Solimyth | 13 | John Mead | Alan Oughton |
| 1970 | Knight Of Gold | 10 | Richard Vines | Captain R D Kennedy |
| 1971 | The Ghost | 6 | John Mead | Colonel V le Marchant |
| 1972 | Skygazer | 9 | David Wales | J Bloom |
| 1973 | Pirolace | 12 | John Mead | M Tate |
| 1974 | Merchant Banker | 7 | T Holland-Martin | T Holland-Martin |
| 1975 | Playbill | 10 | David Wales | Lord Fitzwilliam |
| 1976 | Apache Chief | 9 | Bill Tellwright | David Wales |
| 1977 | Neat Perry | 10 | Mr C L Moore | A J C White |
| 1978 | Ten Up | 11 | Captain R L J Hodges | Captain R L J Hodges |
| 1979 | Wisbech Lad | 7 | T Holland-Martin | T Holland-Martin |
| 1980 | Ten Up | 13 | Captain R L J Hodges | Captain Tim Forster |
| 1981 | Border Mark | 13 | Captain J Evetts | Captain J Evetts |
| 1982 | Ten Up | 15 | Captain R L J Hodges | Captain R L J Hodges |
| 1983 | De Pluvinel | 11 | Captain Guy Prest | Kim Bailey |
| 1984 | Quarrier | 7 | Tim Thomson Jones | Captain Tim Forster |
| 1985 | Turn Blue | 6 | Mr Gerald Oxley | Bob Champion |
| 1986 | Quarrier | 9 | Tim Thomson Jones | Tim Forster |
| 1987 | Quarrier | 10 | Tim Thomson Jones | Tim Forster |
| 1988 | Coolcotts | 13 | WO2 DJ Warren | RJR Symonds |
| 1989 | De Pluvinel | 16 | Mr Jon Trice-Rolph | Guy Prest |
| 1990 | De Pluvinel | 17 | Mr Jon Trice-Rolph | Guy Prest |
| 1991 | Roscoe Harvey | 9 | Mr Jon Trice-Rolph | Charlie Brooks |
| 1992 | Camden Belle | 10 | Major Oliver Ellwood | Malcolm Muggeridge |
| 1993 | Gaelic Cherry | 10 | C Ward-Thomas | D E Fletcher |
| 1994 | Wellknown Character | 12 | Lieutenant Dominic Alers-Hankey | Paul Nicholls |
| 1995 | Cool Ground | 13 | Lieutenant Dominic Alers-Hankey | David Elsworth |
| 1996 | Norman Conqueror | 11 | Major Oliver Ellwood | Tim Thomson Jones |
| 1997 | Lucky Dollar | 9 | Major Simon Robinson | Kim Bailey |
| 1998 | Magnetic Reel | 7 | Major Oliver Ellwood | H W Lavis |
| 1999 | Carlisle Banditos | 7 | Lieutenant Alex Michael | T J Berry |
| 2000 | Noyan | 10 | Miss L Horner | C F Elliott |
| 2001 | Mister One | 10 | Major Oliver Ellwood | Colin Tizzard |
| 2002 | Kings Mistral | 9 | Lieutenant H Norton | Patrick Chamings |
| 2003 | Storm Damage | 11 | Mr Jamie Snowden | Paul Nicholls |
| 2004 | Gunner Welburn | 12 | Mr E Andrews | Andrew Balding |
| 2005 | Whitenzo | 9 | Mr Jamie Snowden | Paul Nicholls |
| 2006 | Inca Trail | 10 | Mr Jamie Snowden | Paul Nicholls |
| 2007 | Back Nine | 10 | Major Dominic Alers-Hankey | Miss Jane Western |
| 2008 | Le Duc | 9 | Captain J Snowden | Paul Nicholls |
| 2009 | Bannister Lane | 9 | Captain Tim Edwards | Donald McCain |
| 2010 | Mr Big | 9 | Captain HAR Wallace | J Mann |
| 2011 | Surenaga | 9 | Lance Bombardier Sally Randell | Miss Sally Randell |
| 2012 | Bradley | 8 | Mr Richard Spencer | Fergal O'Brien |
| 2013 | Gwanako | 10 | Lance Bombardier Jody Sole | Paul Nicholls |
| 2014 (Note: The 2014 race was run at Wincanton) | Savant Bleu | 8 | Captain HAR Wallace | Kim Bailey |
| 2015 | Cowards Close | 8 | Lance Bombardier Jody Sole | Paul Nicholls |
| 2016 | Jennys Surprise | 8 | Miss Brodie Hampson | Fergal O'Brien |
| 2017 | Rathlin Rose | 9 | Captain Guy Disney | David Pipe |
| 2018 | Rathlin Rose | 10 | Captain Guy Disney | David Pipe |
| 2019 | Carlos Du Fruitier | 7 | Miss Brodie Hampson | Ben Pauling |
| | no race 2020 (Note: The 2020 race was abandoned due to waterlogging) |
| | no race 2021 (Note: The 2021 race was cancelled due to the COVID-19 pandemic in the United Kingdom) |
| 2022 | Rolling Dylan | 11 | Major Charlie O'Shea | Philip Hobbs |
| 2023 | Broken Halo | 8 | Lance Bombardier Jody Sole | Paul Nicholls |
| 2024 | Farceur Du Large | 9 | Major Will Kellard | Jamie Snowden |
| 2025 | Frenchy Du Large | 10 | Sgt Nick Oliver | Venetia Williams |
| 2026 | Abandoned |

== See also ==
- Horse racing in Great Britain
- List of British National Hunt races
