= Birgit Cunningham =

British-American activist (born 1963)

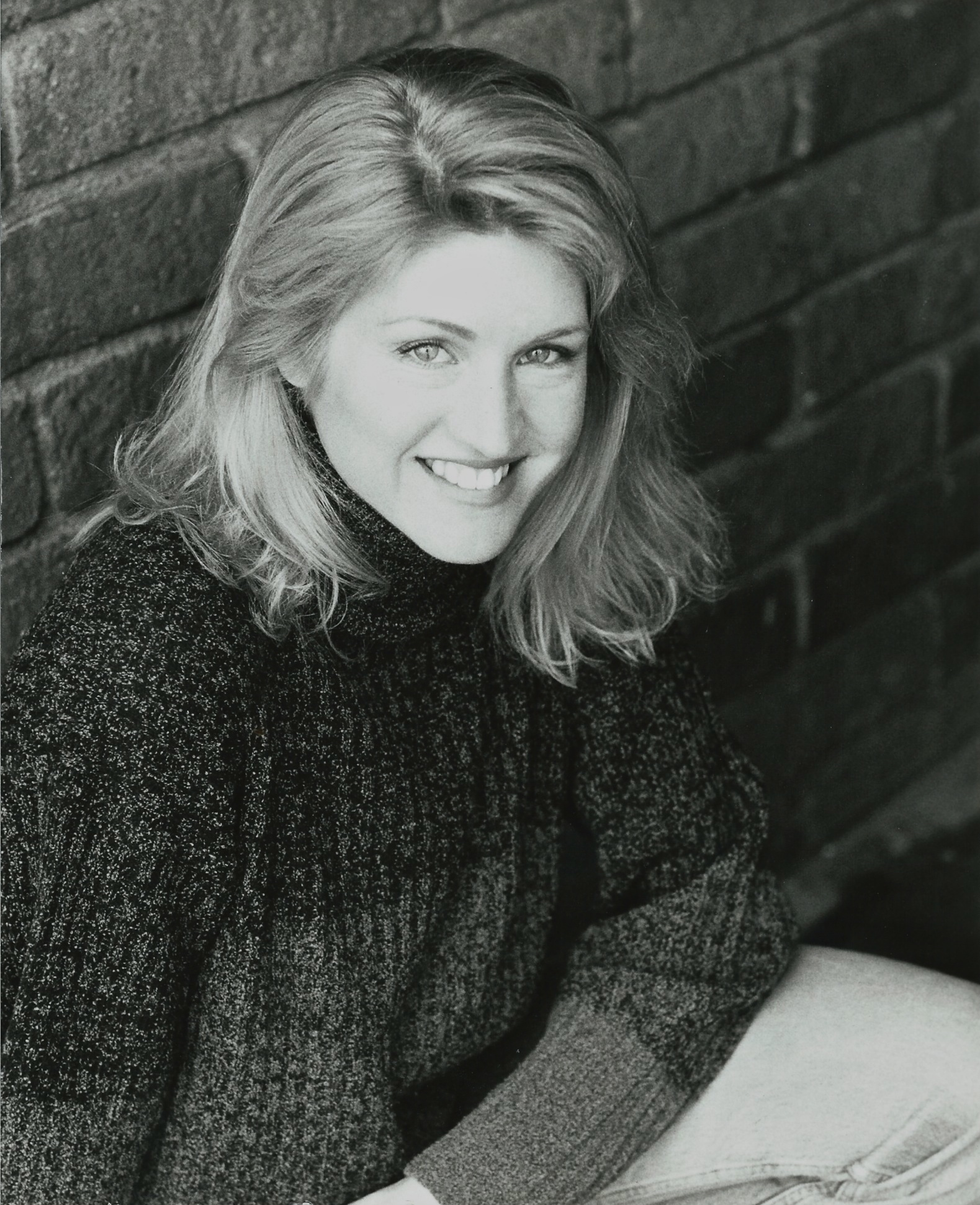
- Cunningham in 1995
- Born: 6 January 1963 (age 63); San Francisco, California, US
- Education: Rutgers
- Occupations: Events organiser; Activist; Campaigner
- Spouse: Gedeon Burkhard (divorced)
- Children: 1

Birgit Cunningham (born 6 January 1963) is a British-American events organiser, activist, and campaigner for the rights of single mothers.

== Early life ==
Cunningham was born in San Francisco, the daughter of a treasurer of the Bank of America and a German-born mother, and is the eldest of three daughters. When she was nine, her family moved to England and settled at Leatherhead in Surrey. She was educated at Roedean, then earned a degree in history of art at Rutgers University. After that, aged twenty-two, she moved to Paris and worked in an art gallery.

In 1987, Cunningham moved to Chelsea, London, and became a yacht broker in the City of London. A self-described gold digger, she became "a serial dater of trust-funded, Chelsea-based bachelors".

== Los Angeles ==
Moving to Los Angeles, she took a job as personal assistant to a vice-president of Universal Pictures and shared a house with Elizabeth Hurley and Julia Verdin. In 1993, William Cash thanked Cunningham for her help with his book Educating William: Memoirs of a Hollywood Correspondent.

Cunningham continued her "party-girl" ways in Los Angeles, dating American actor Kevin Costner for three years and, in 1996, marrying German actor Gedeon Burkhard in Las Vegas then soon divorcing him. Her binge drinking turned into alcoholism, one time drinking a bottle of tequila, becoming unconscious and found herself in hospital.

== Return to England ==
In 1997, Cunningham returned to England, and joined Alcoholics Anonymous. She lived for a time in a commune in Devon, joining Greenpeace, and working for The Ecologist magazine and the Green Party. In 1999, she helped to persuade Sting, Jude Law, Simon and Yasmin Le Bon and Sadie Frost to support an organic picnic in Greenwich. As an events organiser, she co-ordinated green protests against GM food.

In February 2000, at a conference of the National Farmers' Union, as a protest against a financial crisis for small farmers, Cunningham squashed a chocolate éclair into the face of Nick Brown, the Labour government's Minister of Agriculture, Fisheries and Food. Later she said she had "just flipped" and was sorry. Zac Goldsmith, editor of The Ecologist, commented that Cunningham was likely to be helping the magazine to hold its own conference on "the real farm crisis". Brown said to The Guardian "It was not a samurai sword. It was a chocolate eclair. Although I am not a particularly brave person, I am not frightened of chocolate eclairs." In the words of the New Statesman, "The farmers were content to growl their protests while the politicians spun their policy; so Birgit Cunningham took gooey matter into her own hands and – splat! – pushed her cause (and herself) onto an unsuspecting nation."

In 2001, Cunningham took a job with the Green Party, working as senior press officer for the Green members of the newly established London Assembly.

== Motherhood and child support activist ==
In England, Cunningham revived a relationship with Harry Nuttall, a racing driver from a rich family that she had dated before leaving for California. She became pregnant in October 2001, and their son Jack Cunningham-Nuttall was born in June 2002. According to Cunningham's own account, Nuttall at first accepted responsibility for the child, but over the following months, in her words, "slowly, he disappeared from my life". At Christmas 2001, Nuttall met another woman, and they were married in July 2002, two weeks after the birth of the boy. Cunningham took her story to the press, and a long feature appeared in the Evening Standard the day before Nuttall's wedding, revealing the birth of their son. Despite dating him for the nearly two years, including sexual relations, Cunningham retconned in the article that Nuttall "... didn't really register on my Richter scale". Nuttall continued to dispute his role in the birth of his son until forced to take a paternity test. Nuttall proved to the Child Support Agency (CSA) that he could afford only UK£5.40 per week (equivalent to £10.01 in 2025) in child support.

Cunningham took a one-year paralegal course at Westminster College, and alongside her own dispute over child support she began a long-running campaign to reform the child support system. She formed a group called Babies for Justice (which later merged with Mothers for Justice), and organised a protest march to Downing Street. In 2004, she gave evidence to the House of Commons Work and Pensions Committee for its report on the performance of the Child Support Agency. A court hearing in 2005 confirmed the level of support from Nuttall as £5.40 a week, and on the way out of court Cunningham kneed Nuttall in the groin. She was charged with assault and appeared in a magistrate's court in November 2006, pleading "guilty as hell". After explaining the background to the case she received a conditional discharge.

Nuttall's father, Sir Nicholas paid the airfares for a visit to his grandson in the Bahamas in 2005, and in July 2007, a few days before his death, arranged a final meeting. After that, Cunningham asked the CSA for a child support review, but Nuttall proved to the CSA that he had no income at all, and the payments of £5.40 ended. A claim in the family division of the High Court failed to award any child support, after the judge, Mr Justice Singer, had asked "Do you seriously expect Mr Nuttall to sell his shooting rifles for child maintenance?"

In 2011, Cunningham sold her story to the Sunday Mirror that, between late 2003 and the early weeks of 2011, she had sexual relations with Thomas Strathclyde, Conservative Leader in the House of Lords, who had shown in interest in helping with her campaign regarding the CSA. Cunningham stated that she sold the story after hearing that the government had plans to make parents pay for using the services of the CSA, as she was "... fed up of this Government's hypocrisy and how they preach to us about family values." At the time, she also offered a public apology to Lady Strathclyde for having sex with her husband.

== Later life ==
In 2011 Cunningham was reported to be suffering from back pain caused by scoliosis and degenerative disc disease, diagnosed in 2006. In 2012, she was in a wheelchair and hoping for surgery.

Her son, Jack, is an actor who appeared as Young Hamlet in the 2018 film Ophelia.

== External picture links ==
- Picture with eclair, February 2000, at Alamy.com
- Downing Street Farmers protest picture 1 at Alamy.com
- Downing Street Farmers protest picture 2 at Alamy.com
- Food Labelling Campaign picture at Alamy.com
- Environment Campaigner Birgit Cunningham with Harry Nuttall, 1993, by Landmark Media at imagecollect.com
- Mrs Gijsberk Groenwegen and Birgit Cunningham at Sotheby's New Collectors Party 14 September 2000 at Tatler.com
- Lady Lara Compton and Birgit Cunningham at Samantha Shaw Preview, 15 January 1998 in The Tatler
