= Grand Military Gold Cup =

Steeplechase horse race for amateur riders in Britain

Grand Military Gold Cup
2019
Le Reve	Spanish Arch	Mr Mercurial

Previous years
2017
Rathlin Rose	Renard	A Tail of Intrigue
2016
Jennys Surprise	Ardkilly Witness	Minellahalfcentury
2015
Loose Chips	Merrion Square	A Tail of Intrigue
2014
Bradley	Le Reve	Solix
2013
Merrion Square	Tafika	Martys Mission
2012
Masked Man	Red Harbour	Hoo La Baloo
2011
Blu Teen	Ice Tea	Surenaga
2010
Scots Dragoon	River Indus	Distant Thunder
2009
Oakfield Legend	Mr Big	Jamadiel
2008
Bolachoir	Turthen	Ede'iff
2007
Hoo La Baloo	Cedar Chief	Admiral Peary
2006
Inca Trail	Happy Hussar	Back Nine

The Grand Military Gold Cup is a National Hunt steeplechase in England which is open to horses aged five years or older. It is run at Sandown Park over a distance of about 3 miles (3 miles and 37 yards or 4,862 metres), and it is scheduled to take place each year in January.

The race was first run in 1841 and the 150th running took place in 2013.

The race is restricted to (currently serving) military amateur riders. Ownership of the horses in the race was also limited to serving or ex-serving members of the armed forces prior to 2023, when the race conditions were changed to remove the restriction. Prior to 2024 the race was run in March. A similar race, the Royal Artillery Gold Cup, is run at Sandown in February.

== Winners ==
Year	Winner	Age	Jockey	Trainer
1841	Carlow		Captain Sir J G Baird	
	no race 1842			
1843	The Sawyer		Mr Boucheret	
1844	Brenda		Captain H H France	
1845	Boxkeeper		Captain J R J Collis	
1846	Cinderella		Captain H N Powell	
1847	The Roarer		Sir E Poore	
1848	Master Robin		Captain E Dyson	
1849	Master Robin		Captain E Dyson	
1850	Hawksworth		Captain E Dyson	
1851	Fugleman		Lieutenant R A Fraser	
1852	Palmerston		Hon J W H Hutchinson	
1853	Minna		Mr F W F Berkeley	
1854	Torrent		Mr H J Wilkin	
	no race 1855-57			
1858	Young Magnet		Viscount A Talon	
1859	Goldsmith		Captain G W Hunt	
1860	The Hermit		Captain J H Anderson	
1861	Inniskilling		Captain Hon F G Ellis	
1862	Fanny		Captain F Wombwell	
1863	Rifleman		Captain G W H Riddell	
1864	Bell's Life		Captain A Smith	
1865	Glencairn		Mr Stevenson	
1866	Ironside		Colonel G W Knox	
1867	Tally-Ho		Mr Gerrard	
1868	King Arthur		Colonel G W Knox	
1869	Juryman		Mr Pritchard	
1870	Knockany		Colonel G W Knox	
1871	Donato		Mr Pritchard	
1872	Charleville		Mr H Browne	
1873	Revirescat		Mr W H Johnstone	
1874	Marc Antoine		Colonel W Harford	
1875	Lady Sneerwell		Mr W H Johnstone	
1876	Earl Marshall		Mr W H Johnstone	
1877	Chilblain		Mr W B Morris	
1878	Chilblain		Mr W B Morris	
1879	Boyne Water		Mr M J Hartigan	
1880	Cymrw		Mr H S Dalbiac	
1881	Lobelia		Mr J F S Lee Barber	
1882	Lord Chancellor		Lord Manners	
1883	Beaufort		Mr J F S Lee Barber	
1884	Larva		Mr J F B Murdoch	
1885	Scorn		Mr Barton	A Yates
1886	Standard		Mr T Hone	A Yates
1887	Dalesman		Captain R B W Fisher	Swatton
1888	Bertha		Mr A Hughes-Onslow	Mr H T Fenwick
1889	St Cross		Captain E R Owen	Collins
1890	Lady Sarah		Captain J L Little	Jones
1891	Hollington		Captain C Lambton	Captain A E Whitaker
1892	Ormerod		Captain P Berwicke	J Cannon
1893	Themidshipmite		Captain J B Murdoch	Swatton
1894	Aesop		Sir C Slade	Craddock
1895	Field Marshall		Mr E Crawley	T Cannon
1896	Nelly Gray		Mr D G Campbell	
1897	Parapluie		Mr D G Campbell	Escott
1898	County Council	aged	Major A Hughes-Onslow	Sir C Nugent
1899	Lambey	6	Captain W Murray-Thriepland	Captain W Murray-Thriepland
	no race 1900-02			
1903	Marpessa		Major A Hughes-Onslow	McNally
1904	Dunboyne	5	Major W Ricardo	Captain Dewhurst
1905	Ruy Lopez	5	Captain Stacpoole	Captain Dewhurst
1906	Royal Blaze	6	Captain L S Denny	Costello
1907	Old Fairyhouse	5	Captain C Bewicke	J J Maher
1908	Mount Prospect's Fortune	6	Captain G Paynter	J J Maher
1909	Sprinkle Me	aged	Captain C W Banbury	F B Hunt
1910	Sprinkle Me	aged	Captain C W Banbury	F B Hunt
1911	Vinegar Hill	6	Mr D McCalmont	H S Persse
1912	Another Delight	aged	Mr E H Wyndham	F Withington
1913	Another Delight	aged	Mr E H Wyndham	F Withington
1914	Jack Symonds	aged	Captain G Paynter	W Taylor
	no race 1915-19			
1920	White Surrey	8	Major C T Walwyn	F B Hunt
1921	Pay Only	11	Mr W Filmer Sankey	H Brown
1922	Pay Only	12	Mr W Filmer Sankey	H Brown
1923	Annie Darling	7	Mr R L McCreery	H B Bletsoe
1924	Lee Bridge	7	Mr R G Shaw	F Withington
1925	Ruddyglow	7	Mr W Filmer Sankey	H Brown
1926	Foxtrot	10	Captain H Lumsden	P Woodland
1927	Scotch Eagle	11	Captain A F W Gossage	P Woodland
1928	Dash O'White	8	Captain R L McCreery	A Stubbs
1929	Drin	5	Captain A F W Gossage	P Woodland
1930	Drintyre	7	Mr C N Brownhill	P Thrale
1931	Slieve Grien	10	Captain R B Moseley	R Payne
1932	Castletown	10	Sir P Grant Lawson	J Gosden
1933	Backsight	10	Mr P Payne-Gallwey	E Steddal
1934	Crafty Alice	9	Mr T Walls jr	Mr T Walls sr
1935	Young Cuthbert	7	Lieutenant R Courage	A Courage
1936	Misdemeanour II	7	Sir P Grant Lawson	J Gosden
1937	Buck Willow	9	Captain M G Roddick	P Thrale
1938	Kilstar	7	Captain M G Roddick	Captain M G Roddick
1939	Fillip	8	Major M G Roddick	Major M G Roddick
	no race 1940-48			
1949	Demon Vino	7	J Phillips	Major R Brignall
1950	Klaxton	10	Captain W Gibson	Ivor Anthony
1951	Klaxton	11	Captain W Gibson	Ivor Anthony
1952	Klaxton	12	Captain W Gibson	Ivor Anthony
1953	Atom Bomb	9	Major P Fielden	C Mitchell
1954	Pointsman	6	Major C Blacker	A Kilpatrick
1955	Skatealong	7	Major P Fielden	C Mitchell
1956	Cottage Lace	9	Captain W Gibson	R Turnell
1957	Easter Breeze	9	Major R Dill	Harry Thomson Jones
1958	Stalbridge Park	8	Sir Nicholas Nuttall	A Kilpatrick
1959	Golden Drop	8	Captain P Upton	C Mitchell
1960	Joan's Rival	6	Captain Piers Bengough	A Kilpatrick
1961	Stalbridge Park	11	Sir Nicholas Nuttall	A Kilpatrick
1962	Cash Desire	7	Major P Greenwood	H Smyth
1963	Baxter	7	Lord Fermoy	A O'Brien (Ir)
1964	Threepwood	11	Captain N Ansell	N Ansell
1965	Rueil	8	B Leigh	Tim Forster
1966	Willow King	11	C Perry	J Barratt
1967	Indian Spice	7	Captain J Powell	Fred Winter
1968	Ballyverine	8	Captain G Nicoll	Ken Cundell
1969	Abandoned because of waterlogged state of course			
1970	Charles Dickens	6	Major Piers Bengough	A Kilpatrick
1971	Charles Dickens	7	Major Piers Bengough	A Kilpatrick
1972	Charles Dickens	8	Lieutenant Colonel Piers Bengough	A Kilpatrick
1973	Ziguenor	11	Major D Chesney	D Chesney
1974	Pakie	9	Maj Andrew Parker Bowles	Fulke Walwyn
1975	Abandoned because of waterlogged state of course			
1976	Lucky Edgar	11	Captain A Cramsie	Lord Ullswater
1977	Double Bridal	6	Captain C Price	Fulke Walwyn
1978	Mr Snowman	9	C Sample	Tim Forster
1979	Ten Up	12	Captain J Hodges	Captain J Hodges
1980	Beeno	8	Broderick Munro-Wilson	Broderick Munro-Wilson
1981	The Drunken Duck	8	Broderick Munro-Wilson	Broderick Munro-Wilson
1982	Ballyross (Note: The 1982 race took place at Kempton Park)	11	Major C Price	Tim Forster
1983	Burnt Oak	7	Colonel A Cramsie	David Nicholson
1984	Special Cargo	11	Gerald Oxley	Fulke Walwyn
1985	Special Cargo	12	Gerald Oxley	Fulke Walwyn
1986	Special Cargo	13	Gerald Oxley	Fulke Walwyn
1987	Burnt Oak	11	Mr P Nicholson	David Nicholson
1988	Columbus	11	Major C Lane	Fulke Walwyn
1989	Brother Geoffrey	10	Captain A Smith-Maxwell	David Nicholson
1990	The Argonaut	12	Mr Gerald Oxley	Fulke Walwyn
1991	Brunton Park	13	Captain C Ward Thomas	John Jenkins
1992	Gunner Stream	8	Mr B Marquis	Richard Holder
1993	On The Other Hand	10	Captain A Ogden	Gordon W. Richards
1994	Quick Rapor	9	Mr Dominic Alers-Hankey	Richard Barber
1995	Country Member	10	Major Oliver Ellwood	Andrew Turnell
1996	Norman Conqueror	11	Major Oliver Ellwood	Tim Thomson Jones
1997	Act The Wag	8	Captain A Ogden	Martin Todhunter
1998	Silver Stick	11	Mr Miles Watson	Mick Easterby
1999	Court Melody	11	Mr Dominic Alers-Hankey	Paul Nicholls
2000	Camitrov	10	Mr R Sturgis	Nicky Henderson
2001	Kings Mistral	8	Mr H Norton	Patrick Chamings
2002	Folly Road	12	Mr Jamie Snowden	D Williams
2003	Kings Mistral	10	Lieutenant A Michael	Patrick Chamings
2004	Mercato	8	Captain R T Sturgis	John Best
2005	Whitenzo	9	Captain Jamie Snowden	Paul Nicholls
2006	Inca Trail	10	Captain Jamie Snowden	Paul Nicholls
2007	Hoo La Baloo	6	Captain Jamie Snowden	Paul Nicholls
2008	Bolachoir	6	Captain A Michael	Patrick Chamings
2009	Oakfield Legend	8	Lance Bombardier Sally Randell	Pip Payne
2010	Scots Dragoon	8	Major A Michael	Nicky Henderson
2011	Blu Teen	11	Lance Bombardier Jody Sole	D J Staddon
2012	Masked Man	9	Captain Harry Wallace	Charlie Mann
2013	Merrion Square	7	Lance Bombardier Jody Sole	Paul Nicholls
2014	Bradley	10	Lance Bombardier Sally Randell	Fergal O'Brien
2015	Loose Chips	9	Miss Sally Randell	Charlie Longsdon
2016	Jennys Surprise	8	Lieutenant Colonel Erica Bridge	Fergal O'Brien
2017	Rathlin Rose	9	Captain Guy Disney	David Pipe
2018	Baden	7	Lieutenant Billy Aprahamian	Nicky Henderson
2019	Le Reve	11	Lance Bombardier Jody Sole	Lucy Wadham
2020	Abandoned because of waterlogged state of course.			
2021	no race 2021 (Note: The 2021 race was cancelled due to the COVID-19 pandemic in the United Kingdom)			
2022	Rolling Dylan	11	Major Charlie O'Shea	Philip Hobbs
2023	Broken Halo	8	Lance Bombardier Jody Sole	Paul Nicholls
2024	Farceur Du Large	9	Major Will Kellard	Jamie Snowden
2025	Fil d'Ariane	10	Captain Douglas White	Captain Douglas White
2026	Abandoned because of waterlogged state of course.			

== See also ==
- Horse racing in Great Britain
- List of British National Hunt races
