= John Nuttall (cricketer) =

English cricketer

Personal information
- Full name: John Daniel Nuttall
- Born: 29 December 1967 (age 58); Fulford, Yorkshire, England
- Batting: Right-handed
- Bowling: Left-arm medium

Domestic team information
- Years: Team
- 1987–1989: Oxford University

Career statistics
Competition	First-class
Matches	9
Runs scored	77
Batting average	9.62
100s/50s	0/0
Top score	35
Balls bowled	1,289
Wickets	12
Bowling average	61.08
5 wickets in innings	0
10 wickets in match	0
Best bowling	2/64
Catches/stumpings	3/–
- Source: Cricinfo, 28 March 2020

John Daniel Nuttall (born 29 December 1967) is an English former first-class cricketer.

Nuttall was born at Fulford in the North Riding of Yorkshire in December 1967. He later studied at St Peter's College, Oxford where he played first-class cricket for Oxford University. He made his debut in first-class cricket against Kent at Oxford in 1987. He played first-class cricket for Oxford until 1989, making nine appearances. In his nine matches, he scored 77 runs with a high score of 35. With his left-arm medium pace bowling, he took 12 wickets at an average of 61.08 and best figures of 2 for 64. He later played in the Lancashire League, before transferring to the Bolton Cricket League as a professional in 1995.
