= Geiger–Nuttall law =

Empirical rule in nuclear physics

In nuclear physics, the Geiger–Nuttall law or Geiger–Nuttall rule relates the decay constant of a radioactive isotope with the energy of the alpha particles emitted. Roughly speaking, it states that short-lived isotopes emit more energetic alpha particles than long-lived ones.

The relationship also shows that half-lives are exponentially dependent on decay energy, so that very large changes in half-life make comparatively small differences in decay energy, and thus alpha particle energy. In practice, this means that alpha particles from all alpha-emitting isotopes across many orders of magnitude of difference in half-life, all nevertheless have about the same decay energy.

Formulated in 1911 by Hans Geiger and John Mitchell Nuttall as a relation between the decay constant and the range of alpha particles in air, in its modern form the Geiger–Nuttall law is

$$\log_{10}T_{1/2}=\frac{A(Z)}{\sqrt{E}}+B(Z)$$

where $T_{1/2}$ is the half-life, E the total kinetic energy (of the alpha particle and the daughter nucleus), and A and B are coefficients that depend on the isotope's atomic number Z. The law works best for nuclei with even atomic number and even atomic mass. The trend is still there for even-odd, odd-even, and odd-odd nuclei but is not as pronounced.

== Cluster decays ==
The Geiger–Nuttall law has even been extended to describe cluster decays, decays where atomic nuclei larger than helium are released, e.g. silicon and carbon.

== Derivation ==
A simple way to derive this law is to consider an alpha particle in the atomic nucleus as a particle in a box. The particle is in a bound state because of the presence of the strong interaction potential. It will constantly bounce from one side to the other, and due to the possibility of quantum tunneling by the wave through the potential barrier, each time it bounces, there will be a small likelihood for it to escape.

A knowledge of this quantum mechanical effect enables one to obtain this law, including coefficients, via direct calculation. This calculation was first performed by physicist George Gamow in 1928.

== See also ==
- Alpha-decay – Type of radioactive decay
