= Sir Edward Lawrence, 1st Baronet =

English Whig politician

Sir Edward Lawrence, 1st Baronet (bef. 1674–1749), of St Ives, Huntingdonshire, was an English Whig politician who sat in the English and British House of Commons from 1705 to 1710.

Lawrence was born before 1674, the eldest son of Rev. Paul Lawrence, rector of Tangmere, Sussex, and his wife Jane Palmer, daughter of William Palmer of Peppering, Sussex. He succeeded his father in 1674 In 1700, he purchased for £800 the office of gentleman usher of the privy chamber, which had a salary of £200 p.a. He was knighted on 21 January or 6 February 1701 and was appointed a Gentleman of the Privy Chamber in 1702, retaining the post until 1726.

At the 1705 English general election, Lawrence was returned as Whig Member of Parliament for Stockbridge and voted for the Court candidate for Speaker on 25 October 1705. He supported the Court with regard to the 'place clause' in the regency bill in February 1706 and acted as teller for the Whigs on occasion. He was appointed a Justice of the Peace for Middlesex under a partisan appointment of Whigs to sit on the Commission of the Peace. At the 1708 British general election, he was returned unopposed as Whig MP for Stocksbridge. He acted as a teller for the Whigs in three divisions and supported the naturalization of the Palatines in 1709. He voted for the impeachment of Dr Sacheverell in 1710. He did not to stand again at the 1710 British general election. In 1711 he was turned out of the commission of the peace for Westminster and Middlesex.

Lawrence was created baronet on 17 January 1748. He died unmarried on 2 May 1749, and was succeeded by his nephew Isaac Woollaston.

Parliament of England
Preceded by Henry Killigrew; Anthony Burnaby	Member of Parliament for Stockbridge; 1705–1707; With: Sir John Hawles	Succeeded by Parliament of Great Britain
Parliament of Great Britain
Preceded by Parliament of England	Member of Parliament for Stockbridge; 1707–1710; With: Sir John Hawles	Succeeded by George Dashwood; The Earl of Barrymore
Baronetage of Great Britain
New creation	Baronet (of Loseby); 1748-1749	Succeeded by Isaac Woollaston
