= Guy Disney =

British steeplechase jockey

- Born: 17 March 1982 (age 44)
- Education: Malvern College; Royal Agricultural University
- Occupation: Jockey
- Known for: Winner, Royal Artillery Gold Cup, Sandown Park, Surrey (Feb. 2017); First amputee to win a horse race at a professional race course in Britain; British Army veteran

Captain Guy Fraser Disney MBE (born 17 March 1982) is a British steeplechase jockey and former soldier.

Disney served with the British Army in the War in Afghanistan (2001–2021); he lost his leg in an explosion there in 2009. He became the first amputee jockey to win a horse race at a professional racecourse in Britain – he won the 2017 Royal Artillery Gold Cup at Sandown Park Racecourse.

== Education ==
From 1995–2000, Disney was educated at Malvern College, a co-educational boarding and day independent school in Malvern in Worcestershire. He then attended the Royal Agricultural University in Cirencester.

== Life and career ==
Guy Disney served in The Light Dragoons, a cavalry regiment of the British Army, seeing active service in Afghanistan. In July 2009, while on patrol at Babaji in Helmand Province, his vehicle was attacked with a rocket-propelled grenade. Disney was seriously injured; his lower right leg was amputated, and subsequently he was fitted for a prosthetic limb.

Disney worked for the charity Walking With The Wounded, which helps wounded former British Armed Forces servicemen and women transition to civilian life. In March 2014, he returned to his former boarding school, Malvern College, to talk about his successful expedition with the organisation, accompanied by other wounded former service personnel, to both the North and South Poles.

Disney applied for a jockey licence, but his application to ride with a prosthetic limb was initially rejected by the British Horseracing Authority; it was eventually granted in 2015. He finished third place on the horse Ballyallia Man at Sandown Park's Royal Artillery Gold Cup on 13 February in the same year. He won the same event, riding Rathlin Rose, on 17 February 2017. The horse was trained by David Pipe. Disney later said his thoughts turned to his comrades who had died in Afghanistan when he won.

He was appointed Member of the Order of the British Empire (MBE) in the 2020 New Year Honours for services to horse racing, polar expeditions, and veterans' charities.
