= Fowke baronets =

Baronetcy in the Baronetage of the United Kingdom

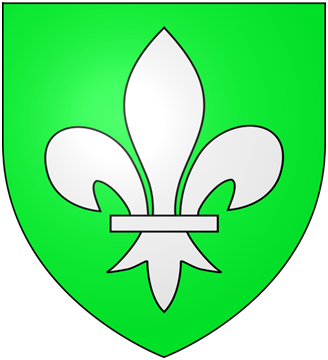
Arms of Fowke baronets of Lowesby: Vert, a fleur-de-lys argent

The Fowke Baronetcy, of Lowesby in the County of Leicester, is a title in the Baronetage of the United Kingdom.

It was created on 7 February 1814 for Frederick Gustavus Fowke of Lowesby Hall, Lowesby, near Leicester. He was the son of Lieutenant-General Sir Thomas Fowke, Groom of the Bedchamber to the Duke of Cumberland. His grandfather was Lieutenant-General Thomas Fowke, Governor of Gibraltar.

The Fowke baronets also held the manor of Billesdon, Leicestershire.

The family surname is pronounced "Foke".

== Fowke baronets, of Lowesby (1814) ==
- Sir Frederick Gustavus Fowke, 1st Baronet (1782–1856)
- Sir Frederick Thomas Fowke, 2nd Baronet (1816–1897)
- Sir Frederick Ferrers Conant Fowke, 3rd Baronet (1879–1948)
- Sir Frederick Woollaston Rawdon Fowke, 4th Baronet (1910–1987) (son)
- Sir David Frederick Gustavus Fowke, 5th Baronet (born 1950) (nephew, son of Gerrard George Fowke (born 1915), younger son of 3rd Baronet). As of 2026 is no heir to the baronetcy.

The Fowke family moved to Upcott Farm in the parish of Bishops Tawton, Devon. The 3rd Baronet's sister, Betty Mirabelle Fowke (born 1912) married into the Chichester family of Hall, Bishop's Tawton, Devon.

Baronetage of the United Kingdom
Preceded by Wraxall baronets	Fowke baronets of Lowesby; 7 February 1814	Succeeded by Beresford-Peirse baronets
