= Hollandsche Beton Groep =

Dutch construction company

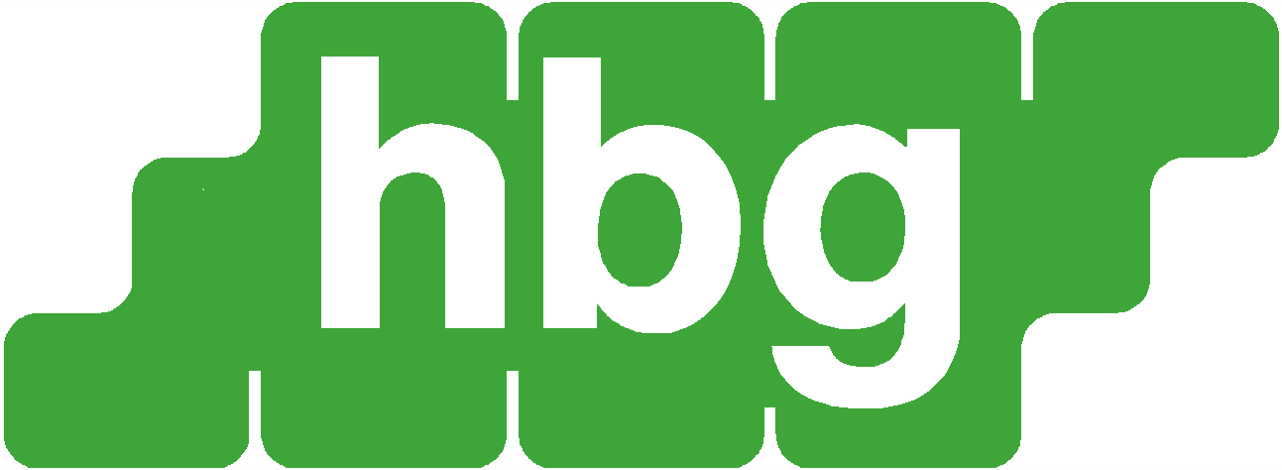
- Logo used from the 1970s to its acquisition by Royal BAM Group
- Company type: Private
- Industry: Construction
- Founded: 1902
- Defunct: 2002
- Fate: Acquired
- Successor: Royal BAM Group

Hollandsche Beton Groep nv (HBG) was a Netherlands-based construction group founded in 1902. It expanded internationally in the late 20th century, acquiring businesses in the United Kingdom, before being itself acquired by Netherlands competitor Royal BAM NBM to form the Royal BAM Group.

== History ==
Hollandsche Beton Groep NV was founded as Hollandsche Beton Maatschappij NV (HBM) in 1902. During 1960, its Indonesian business was nationalized and eventually became PT Hutama Karya (Persero). In 1968, HBM merged with the Leiden-based Hollandse Constructie Groep (HCG), creating the largest construction company in the Netherlands with 8,000 employees, of which 5,400 came from HBM and 2,600 from HCG.

During the 1970s, HBG pursued a strategy of expanding overseas; one of the more major acquisitions made around this time was the British civil engineering contracting firm Edmund Nuttall Ltd in 1978. In the latter half of the 1980s, the company starting focusing upon growing into one of the leading participants in the European construction market. In 1989, the company acquired the British firm Kyle Stewart; later that same year, the Belgian-based firm Société de Traveaux Galère sa and RET, Regel- en Electrotechniek bvba was acquired. Starting in 1988, HBM was one of the ten largest construction companies active in Northwest Europe; by 1992, it employed 16,348 people.

During 1991, HBG announced that it intended to expand its building interests in the UK market from generating an annual turnover of £355 million to £500 million via a series of acquisitions. Accordingly, it purchased the Glasgow-based contractor GA Holdings (formerly Gilbert Ash) in 1992, and the London-centric construction firm Higgs and Hill in 1996. Its subsidiary Edmund Nuttall also made several acquisitions during this time, such as Hynes Construction (1992), John Martin Construction (1999) and Finchpalm Ltd (2000). Typically, these individual companies' names were initially retained with the HBG prefix; however, several were combined together and rebranded as HBG Construction with effect from 1 January 1999.

During 2000, HBG and the Dutch maritime construction firm Boskalis Westminster NV explored multiple avenues aimed at merging the two businesses, ranging from a hostile takeover to even agreeing terms from a friendly transaction. However, even though the European Commission cleared such a deal to proceed, it did not come to fruition, allegedly due to disagreements over the proposed combined enterprise's direction. It was speculated that such an arrangement would have created the market leader in the Benelux region (in terms of turnover) as well as one of the five largest European construction companies.

In February 2002, the whole group was the subject of a takeover bid by Spain's Dragados Group under a deal that was cleared by the European Commission during April 2002. However, this deal was short-lived; in June 2002, Dragados sold off HBG to the Dutch group Royal BAM NBM to form the Koninklijke BAM Groep, and pave the way for Dragados's merger with the Spanish-based competitor, ACS. During 2008, HBG was rebranded as BAM; the British civil engineering business became BAM Nuttall, while HBG Construction became BAM Construct UK.
