= Nuttall baronets =

Baronetcy in the Baronetage of the United Kingdom

The Nuttall Baronetcy, of Chasefield in the Parish of Bowdon in the County of Chester, is a title in the Baronetage of the United Kingdom. It was created on 22 June 1922 for Edmund Nuttall. He was head of Edmund Nuttall Limited, civil engineering contractors, of Manchester.

== Nuttall baronets, of Chasefield (1922) ==
- Sir Edmund Nuttall, 1st Baronet (1870–1923)
- Sir (Edmund) Keith Nuttall, 2nd Baronet (1901 – 31 August 1941), killed in the Second World War whilst serving as a Lieutenant Colonel with the Royal Engineers, and succeeded by his only son, then eight years old.
- Sir Nicholas Keith Lillington Nuttall, 3rd Baronet (22 September 1933 – 29 July 2007), environmentalist who resided since 1979 in the Bahamas, and was married four times.
- Sir Harry Nuttall (born 1963), who had a son with Birgit Cunningham prior to marrying his current wife.

The heir apparent is the present holder's eldest son, Jack Cunningham-Nuttall (born 2002).
