= L. John Nuttall (educator) =

Leonard John Nuttall (July 6, 1887 – April 18, 1944) was acting president of Brigham Young University (BYU) in 1926 and 1927 while President Franklin S. Harris was on a world tour. He also served as superintendent of multiple school districts in Utah.

Nuttall was the grandson of L. John Nuttall, who was private secretary to Brigham Young, John Taylor and Wilford Woodruff as well as being closely connected with BYU during the early days when it was called Brigham Young Academy.

The younger L. John was born in 1887 the son of L. John Nuttall, Jr. and his wife Christina Little. Nuttall was one of 13 children. Although born in Salt Lake City he was raised in Pleasant Grove, Utah.

Nuttall was appointed principal of a school in Pleasant Grove in 1906, when he was only 19. He joined the BYU faculty in 1908 as a critic teacher at the BYU training school.

In 1910 Nuttall began studies at Columbia University. He married Fannie Burns, a native of Puma, Arizona in 1911. That same year Nuttall completed his bachelor's degree. He finished work on his master's degree in 1912.

From 1912 to 1915 Nuttall was a teacher at Payson High School. He was principal of Spanish Fork High School in 1915 and 1916, and from 1916 to 1918 he served as superintendent of the Iron County School District based in Cedar City, Utah. From 1919 to 1922 he was superintendent of the Nebo School District.

In 1922, Nuttall became the dean of the college of education at BYU. He served in this position until 1930. During this time he also earned his Ph.D. from Columbia University in 1929. From 1922 to 1923 he served as president of the Utah Education Association.

In 1930, he became the director of the Stewart Training School which was affiliated with the University of Utah. In 1932 Nuttall became the superintendent of the Salt Lake City School District. Nuttall served in this position for twelve years until he died in Salt Lake City in 1944 of a coronary occlusion.
