= Jack Nuttall =

Australian rules footballer

Personal information
- Born: 30 January 1929
- Died: 20 August 1992 (aged 63)
- Original team: Sunshine
- Height: 185 cm (6 ft 1 in)
- Weight: 86 kg (190 lb)

Playing career^{1}
| Years | Club | Games (Goals) |
| 1953–1955 | Footscray | 27 (0) |
- ^{1} Playing statistics correct to the end of 1955.

Jack Nuttall (30 January 1929 – 20 August 1992) was an Australian rules footballer who played with Footscray in the Victorian Football League (VFL) during the 1950s.

A defender, Nuttall was a reserve in Footscray's 1954 premiership winning side.
