= L. John Nuttall =

American private secretary (1834–1905)

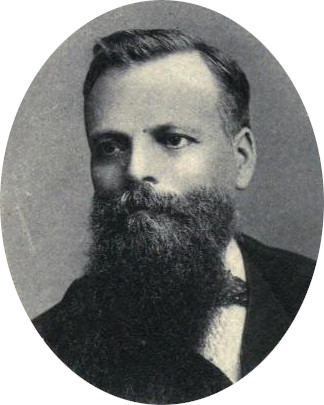

Personal details
- Born: Leonard John Nuttall; July 6, 1834; Liverpool, England
- Died: February 23, 1905 (aged 70); Salt Lake City, Utah, United States
- Resting place: Provo City Cemetery; 40.225°N 111.644°W
- Spouse(s): At least 3
- Children: At least 7
- Parents: William Nuttall; Mary Langhorn

Leonard John Nuttall Sr. (July 6, 1834 – February 23, 1905) was a private secretary for John Taylor and Wilford Woodruff, and was a member of the Council of Fifty who kept a detailed journal of the early history of the Church of Jesus Christ of Latter-day Saints (LDS Church).

Nuttall was born in Liverpool, England and emigrated to Utah Territory in 1852 after converting to the LDS Church. He served in the militia in Utah County, Utah, and was first elected to the Provo City Council in 1861. He served as a justice of the peace and alderman in that city as well. Nuttall also served as the auditor and recorder of Provo from 1861 until 1875. From 1864 until 1875, he served as Utah County Clerk and clerk of the county probate court. He served as the secretary of the Provo Co-Operative Mercantile Institution from its inception in 1869.

Nuttall was also the first person to operate a printing press in Utah County, doing so in 1870.

In 1872 Nuttall was made chief clerk of the Utah Territorial Legislature.

In the LDS Church, Nuttall served for a few years in the 1860s as a member of the high council of the Utah Stake, which covered all of Utah County at the time. From 1874 to 1875 he served as a missionary in England. He was made bishop of the Kanab Ward in 1875. He also served as the first recorder of the St. George Temple. He served as the first president of the Kanab Stake when it was organized in 1877. Starting in 1897, he served as a member of the General Board of the Deseret Sunday School Union.

In 1879, Nuttall became a private secretary for John Taylor, replacing George Reynolds, who was serving a prison term for practicing plural marriage. Nuttall continued in this position first to John Taylor and then to Wilford Woodruff until 1892.

For several years starting in 1880 Nuttall was a member of the University of Deseret board of regents. From 1881 to 1887 he served as Utah Territorial Superintendent of Schools.

Nuttall died in Salt Lake City.

== See also ==
- L. John Nuttall (educator)
