= John Mitchell Nuttall =

English physicist

John Mitchell Nuttall (21 July 1890 – 28 January 1958) was an English physicist, born in Todmorden. He is best remembered for his work with the physicist Hans Geiger, which resulted in the Geiger–Nuttall law of radioactive decay.

Nuttall graduated from the University of Manchester in 1911 and was appointed Assistant Lecturer in Physics at the University of Leeds. During World War I, he served as a captain with the Royal Engineers. In 1921 he became Assistant Director of the University of Manchester's Physical Laboratories and remained in office until 1955.
