= BAM Nuttall =

British construction company

BAM Nuttall Limited
- Type: Subsidiary
- Industry: Construction
- Founded: 1865
- Headquarters: Farnborough, Hampshire, United Kingdom
- Key people: Huw Jones (CEO)
- Owner: Royal BAM Group
- Website: www.bamnuttall.co.uk

BAM Nuttall Limited (formerly known as Edmund Nuttall Limited) is a construction and civil engineering company headquartered in Farnborough, Hampshire, United Kingdom. It has undertaken road, rail, defence, nuclear, energy and other major projects worldwide. It is a subsidiary of the Dutch Royal BAM Group.

Found by James Nuttall Senior in 1865, the company undertook civil engineering works initially in the road and sewerage sectors, in and around Manchester. Over time, it took on various major engineering works, such as those related to the Manchester Ship Canal, Lynton and Barnstaple Railway, and the Mersey Tunnel. Following the death of James Nuttall Senior in 1904, his sons, Sir Edmund Nuttall, 1st Baronet and James Nuttall, headed the company and expanded it throughout Great Britain. During the Second World War, then-head of the company, Sir Keith Nuttall, 2nd Baronet, died in the line of duty with the Royal Engineers while the company itself fulfilled numerous government contracts, including the building of the Mulberry harbour units, various Royal Ordnance Factories, and other defence-related schemes. Following the conflict, the business worked on numerous major projects, including on power stations and several lengthy tunnels, including planning works for the Channel Tunnel.

It was purchased by the Netherlands-based construction group Hollandsche Beton Groep (later HBG), and soon after acquired numerous other businesses, mainly based in the British market. Following the Privatisation of British Rail, the company developed a considerable footprint in the railway construction sector. During 2002, HBG (and thus Edmund Nuttall) was acquired by Royal BAM Group, after which some restructuring was performed. On 10 October 2008, Edmund Nuttall Limited changed its name to BAM Nuttall Limited.

== History ==
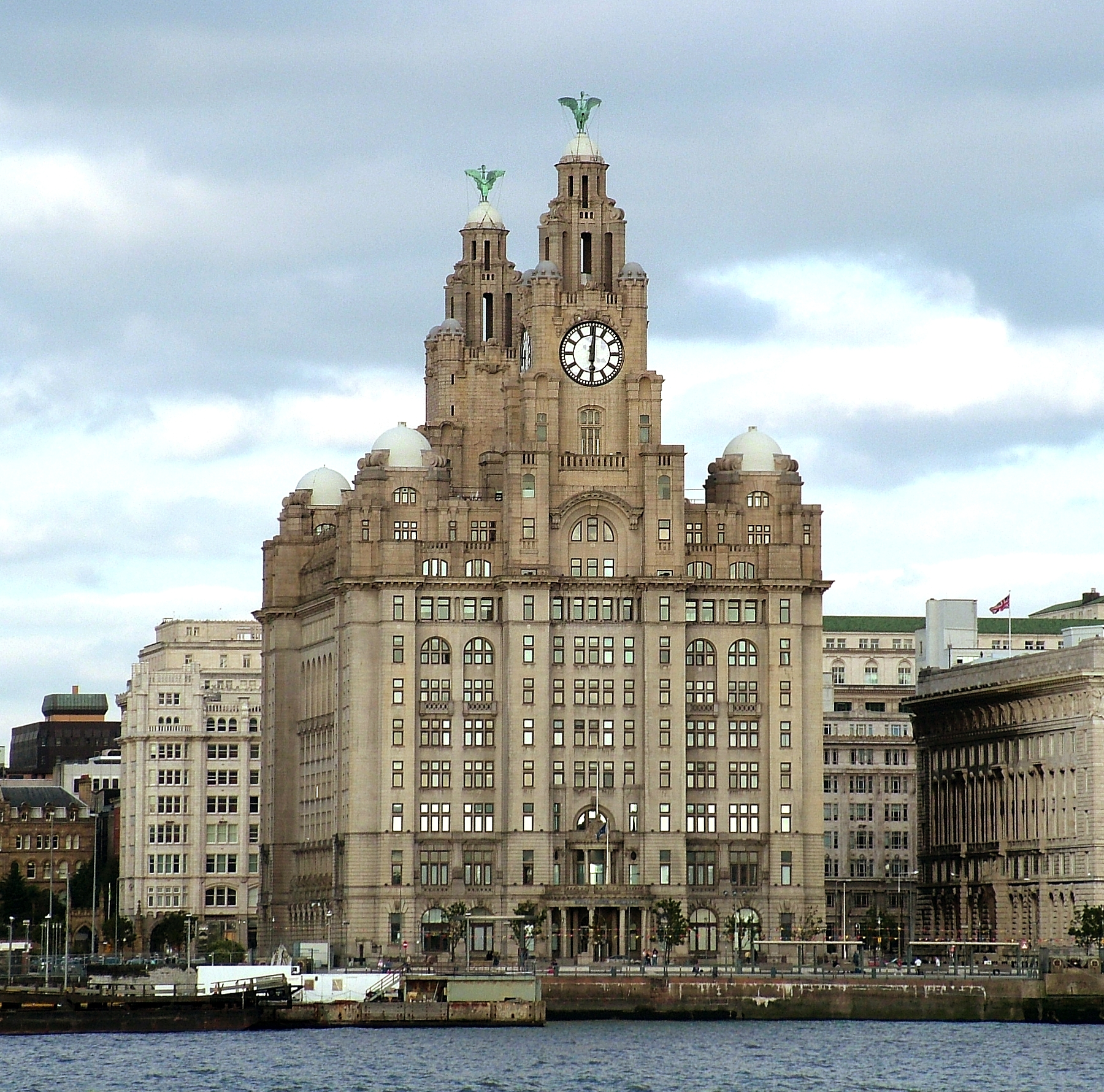
The Liver Building, Liverpool, built by Edmund Nuttall in 1911

The company was founded by James Nuttall Senior in Manchester in 1865. Its initial activities centred around road and sewerage works. Within its first few decades of operations, it undertook various major engineering works associated with infrastructure developments, such as the Manchester Ship Canal (opened in 1894) and the narrow gauge Lynton and Barnstaple Railway (opened in 1898).

During 1902, management of the company changed when James Nuttall Senior brought his two sons, Sir Edmund Nuttall, 1st Baronet (1870–1923) and James Nuttall (1877–1957), into partnership with him, soon after trading under the name Edmund Nuttall & Company. Edmund played a key road in the development of the business following the death of James Nuttall Senior two years later. One particularly decisive contract was the majority of the civil engineering works associated with the construction of the Mersey Tunnel.

Throughout the interwar period, the company expanded into a nationwide enterprise, during which time it was headed by Sir Edmund's son, Sir Keith Nuttall, 2nd Baronet (1901–1941). Other members of the family that would be actively involved in the business was Sir Keith's brother Clive Nuttall (1906–1936) and their cousin (James Nuttall's son) Norman Nuttall (1907–1996). Early on in the Second World War, Sir Keith died in the line of duty with the Royal Engineers after having been severely wounded at Dunkirk; his shares in the business were inherited by his eight-year-old son, Sir Nicholas Nuttall, 3rd Baronet (1933–2007). Despite being the principal shareholder, Sir Nicholas did not play a management role in the company. During the Second World War, the company garnered numerous government contracts. Perhaps the most high-profile of these was its involvement in the building of the Mulberry harbour units alongside several other contractors. Other wartime undertakings included the construction of various Royal Ordnance Factories, underground magazines, and other defence works.

Following the conflict, the company's activities continued to grow in scope, working on the construction of numerous power stations and tunnels throughout the 1950 and 1960s. It was also involved in early efforts towards the construction of the Channel Tunnel.

In 1978, the company was bought by the Netherlands-based construction group Hollandsche Beton Groep (later HBG). One year later, Nuttall acquired rival company Mears. Various acquisitions occurred during the 1990s, including Hynes Construction (1992), John Martin Construction (1999) and Finchpalm Ltd (2000).

During 2002, HBG was acquired (and thus Edmund Nuttall as well) by Royal BAM Group in exchange for €715 million.

On 10 October 2008, Edmund Nuttall Limited changed its name to BAM Nuttall Limited.

During the early 21st century, BAM Nuttall established itself as the principal construction partner of Network Rail, the British railway infrastructure owner, the latter issuing work valued at upwards of £300 million to BAM Nuttall in 2023 alone on projects such as the Levenmouth rail link, Inverness Airport railway station, and the Dawlish sea wall. BAM Nuttall often pursues joint bids with various other companies; one such alliance of companies was appointed in 2017 as the preferred bidder for works as part of the Transpennine Route Upgrade between Manchester and Leeds with a projected completion date of between 2036 and 2041. As part of a separate joint venture, BAM Nuttall is also involved in HS2 lots C2 and C3, which are due to complete in 2031.

During 2023, BAM Nuttall recorded a turnover of £1.165 billion, reportedly achieving a profit of £66m, a year-on-year increase of almost 50 percent.

== Major projects ==
Major projects undertaken by the company include:

- The Liver Building completed in 1911
- Queensway Tunnel under the Mersey completed in 1932
- Dartford Tunnel completed in 1963
- Tyne Tunnel completed in 1967
- Kingsway Tunnel completed in 1971
- Liverpool Merseyrail underground Loop Railway, presently called the Wirral Line, completed in 1978
- Medway Tunnel completed in 1996
- High Speed 1 completed in 2007
- The Cambridgeshire Guided Busway completed in 2011
- Various civil engineering works and soil remediation for the 2012 Summer Olympics completed in 2012
- Victoria Underground station North Ticketing Hall completed in 2017
- Enlargement of the ticket hall at Tottenham Court Road tube station for Crossrail completed in 2017
- The Cross Tay Link Road due to be completed in 2024

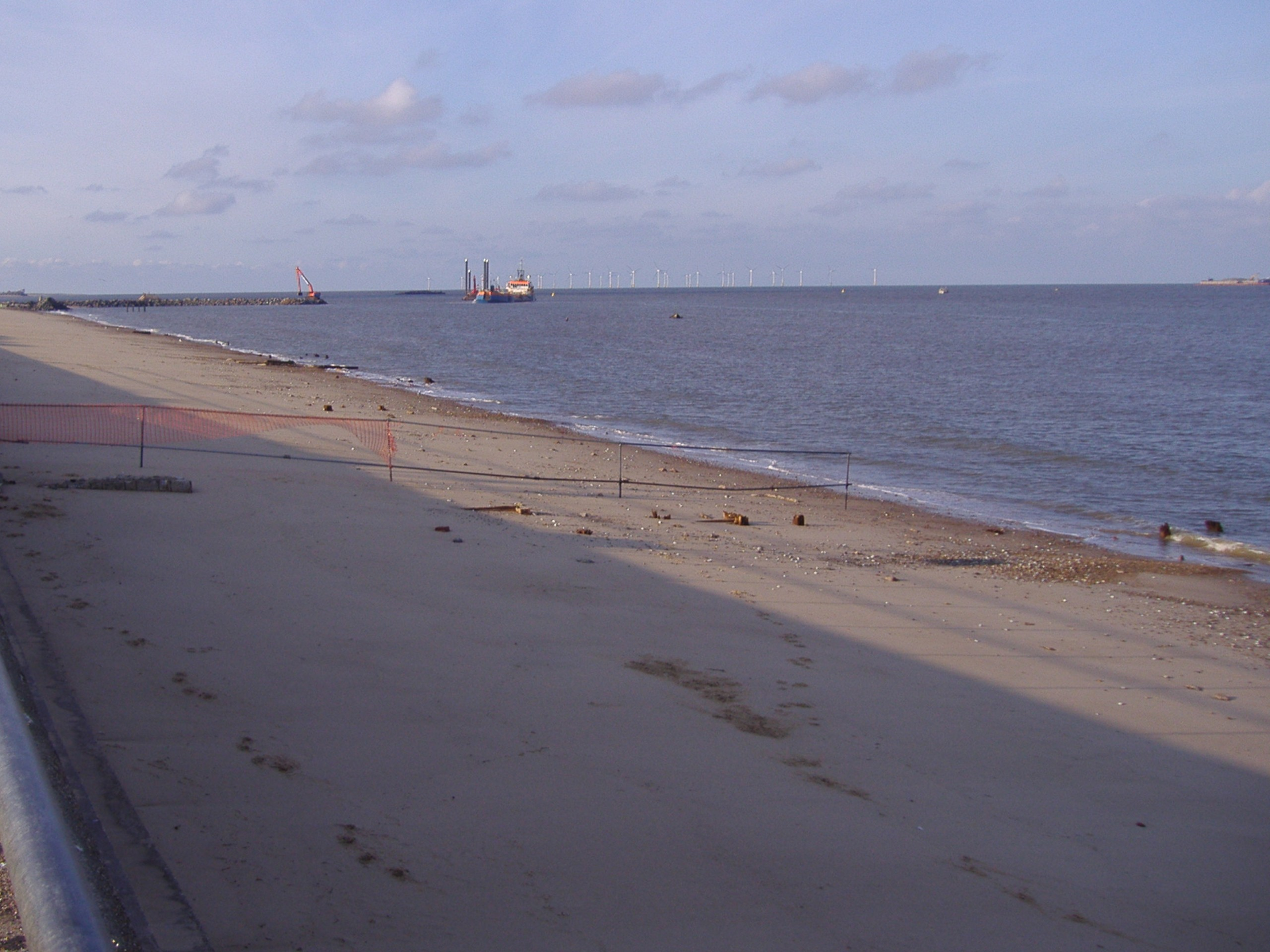
One of Edmund Nuttall's recent contracts, the Great Yarmouth Outer Harbour.

== Climate protest ==
On 5 June 2005, following their bid for a contract to construct the Kingsnorth power station, the company headquarters in Camberley, Surrey were invaded by climate protesters. Thirteen protesters took part in invading the offices, asking to speak about the chairman, distributing leaflets and unfurling a banner. The action resulted in five arrests; however the cases were thrown out with no case to answer.

== See also ==
- British industrial narrow gauge railways
- Interserve
- Speller Metcalfe
- Clancy Docwra
- Wirral Line
