= Harry Nuttall (racing driver) =

British racing driver and sports marketing entrepreneur (born 1963)

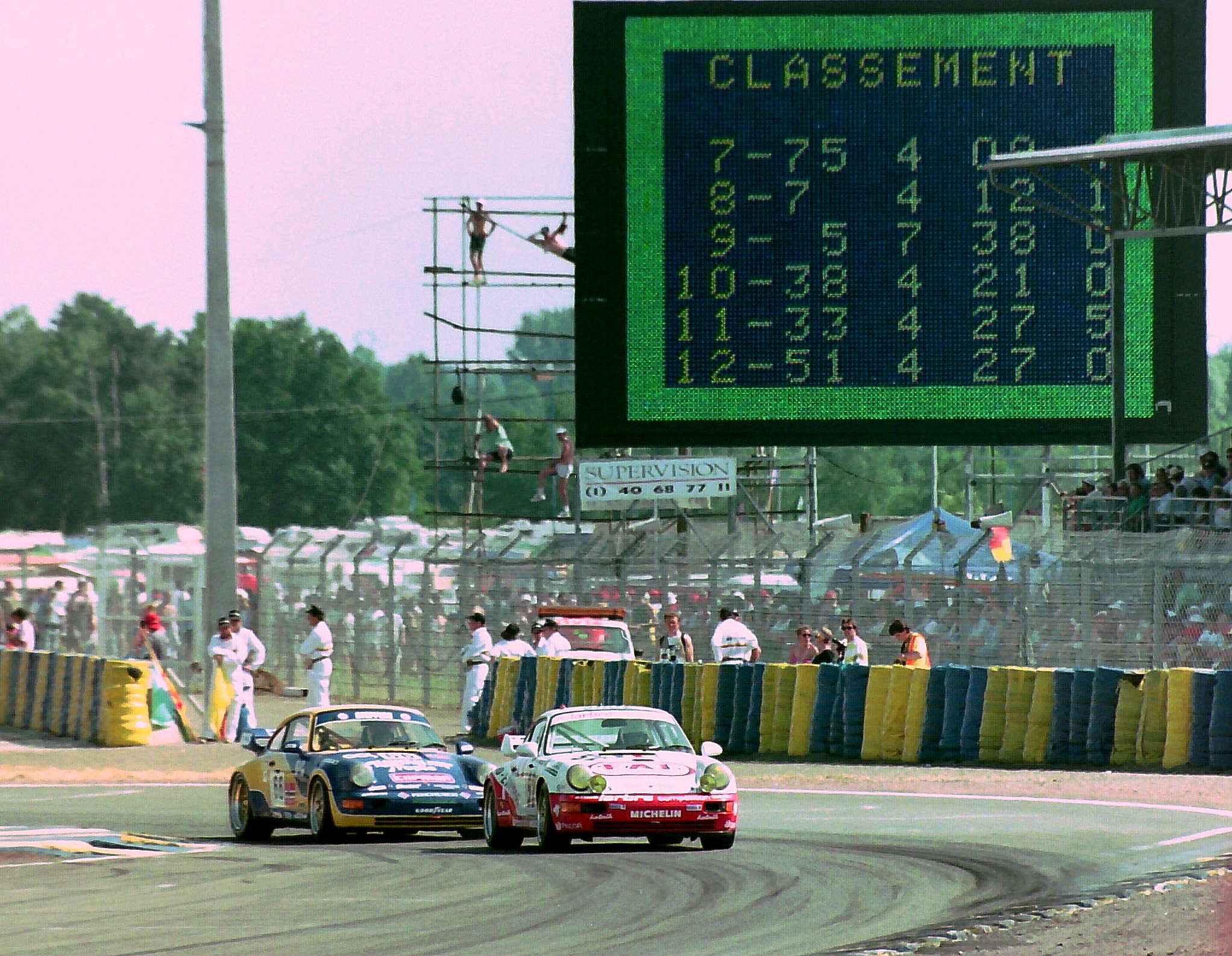
A picture of Sir Harry Nuttall driving during the 1994 Le Mans

Sir Harry Nuttall, 4th Baronet (born January 2, 1963 (age 63)) is a British sports marketing entrepreneur and former racing driver. He has been a senior advisor to the Mercedes AMG Petronas Formula One Team since 2012. He inherited the Nuttall baronetcy on his father's death in 2007.

== Personal life ==
Nuttall is the son of Sir Nicholas Nuttall by his first wife, Rosemary Caroline York (1934–2007), the daughter of Christopher York. He had one sister, Tamara Nuttall (1967–1997). Nuttall was educated at Eton College from 1976–81, before studying at American University from 1981–85.

For eight months of 2001, Nuttall was in a relationship with Birgit Cunningham, after previously knowing each other. She became pregnant in October 2001, and their son Jack Cunningham-Nuttall was born in June 2002. According to Cunningham's own account, Nuttall at first accepted responsibility for the child, but over the following months, in her words, "slowly, he disappeared from my life". Around Christmas 2001, Nuttall met another woman, Dalit Cohen, and they were married in July 2002, two weeks after the birth of the son. Cunningham took her story to the press, and a long feature appeared in the Evening Standard the day before Nuttall's wedding, revealing the birth of their son. Despite dating him for the better part of a year, including sexual relations, Cunningham retconned in the article that Nuttall "... didn't really register on my Richter scale". Nuttall continued to dispute his role in the birth of his son until forced to take a paternity test. Nuttall proved to the Child Support Agency (CSA) that he could afford only £5.40 per week (equivalent to £10.01 in 2025) in child support.

Married with two more children, Nuttall inherited the Nuttall baronetcy in 2007 on the death of his father. Shortly after inheriting the baronetcy, Nuttall proved to the CSA that his income had been reduced to zero, and the CSA stopped any further child support payments to Cunningham.

== Career ==
Nuttall started his career as an associate at Brown Brothers Harriman & Co. Prior to his current role (as of 2023) at Mercedes, he previously worked with the Arrows F1 Team (1998-03), and has advised Intel Corporation (2004-07), Brawn GP (2008-09), and Caterham F1 (2009-12).

1989-1997 Racing Career - Competed in Formula Ford (1989), and Formula Renault (1992 UK (3rd), and European Championships (4th); 1 win, 2 pole positions & 8 podiums); the RAC British Touring Car Championship (1993), and BPR Global Endurance GT Series (1994 Champion with Porsche; 4 wins, 8 podiums). Elected to British Racing Driver’s Club in 1994 and Vice Champion in ’94 BRDC Gold Star Award. Competed in the 1994 24 Hours of Le Mans. Test & Development Driver, Lamborghini Jota Project (1995/6).

== Racing record ==
=== Complete British Touring Car Championship results ===
(key) (Races in bold indicate pole position) (Races in italics indicate fastest lap)

Year	Team	Car	1	2	3	4	5	6	7	8	9	10	11	12	13	14	15	16	17	Pos	Pts
1993	Ecurie Ecosse Vauxhall	Vauxhall Cavalier	SIL	DON	SNE; 16	DON; 15	OUL; 8	BRH; 1 Ret	BRH; 2 DNS	PEM; 6	SIL; 7	KNO; 1; 11	KNO; 2; 9	OUL; 8	BRH; Ret	THR; 15	DON; 1; 9	DON; 2 Ret	SIL; 13	17th	16

=== 24 Hours of Le Mans results ===
(key)

Year	Team	Co-Drivers	Car	Class	Laps	Pos.	Class Pos.
1994	(United Kingdom) Bristow Racing (Norway) Erik Henriksen	(United Kingdom) Ray Bellm (United Kingdom) Charles Rickett	Porsche 911 Carrera RSR	GT2	34	DNF	DNF

Baronetage of the United Kingdom
Preceded by Nicholas Nuttall	Baronet (of Chasefield); 2007–present	Incumbent
