= Sir Edmund Nuttall, 1st Baronet =

British civil engineer

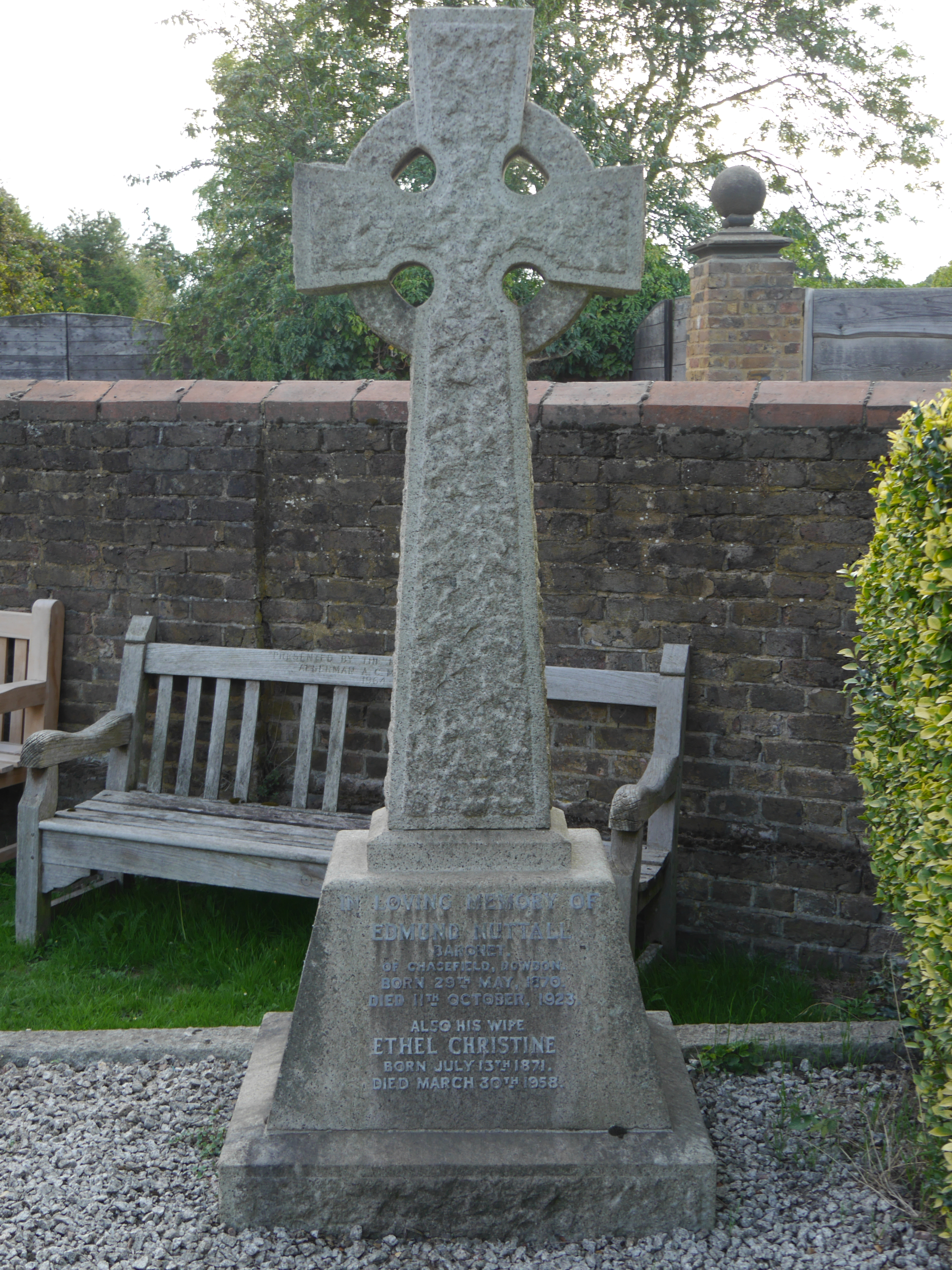
Funerary monument, St Peter's Church, Petersham

Sir Edmund Nuttall, 1st Baronet (29 May 1870 – 11 October 1923) was a British civil engineer, head of Edmund Nuttall Limited.

The company was founded by his father, James Nuttall, but its name was changed after his death.

He is buried at St Peter's Church, Petersham, along with his wife, Ethel Christine Nuttall (1871-1958).

Baronetage of the United Kingdom
New creation	Baronet (of Chasefield); 1922–1923	Succeeded by Keith Nuttall
