= Marlborough gems =

Collection of jewels

The Marlborough gems were a large collection of jewels (cameos and intaglios) assembled by several Dukes of Marlborough. The collection was composed of more than 730 carved gemstones, including garnets, sapphires, emeralds and many cameos. The most famous cameo, and the Duke's favourite, was 'The Marriage of Cupid and Psyche'. A comprehensive catalogue was published in 1870 by Nevil Story Maskelyne. He made impressions and electrotypes, now in the Beazley Archive in Oxford, which have been published.

The Marlborough gems were sold by John Spencer-Churchill, 7th Duke of Marlborough at auction in 1875 to raise money for the maintenance of Blenheim Palace, the ancestral home. The whole collection was bought by David Bromilow and then broken up and sold by his daughter, a Mrs Jary at Christie's in 1899.
