= Blenheim Palace in film and media =

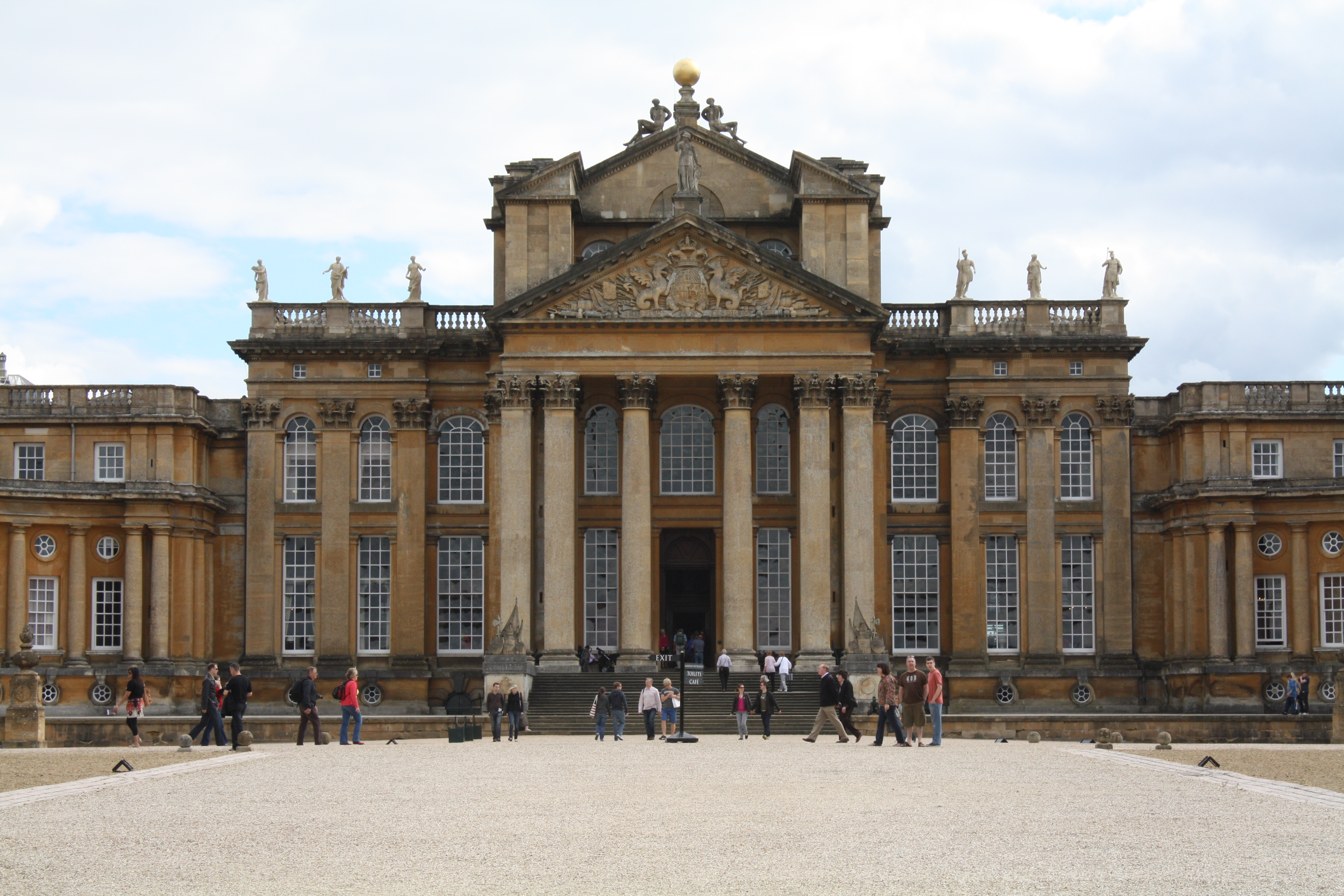
Blenheim Palace

Blenheim Palace has frequently been the setting for books, TV programs and films and other events. These include:

== As a filming location ==
=== Film ===
A 2021 survey by House of Oak concluded that Blenheim Palace had made 71 appearances in film and television, more than any other English country house; the site offers a tour of the various filming locations there. Films shot at the exteriors include Spectre, Harry Potter and the Order of the Phoenix and Transformers: The Last Knight. The Great Court is the most popular filming location, films shot here include Napoleon, Dolittle, Entrapment and Gulliver's Travels. The interior has been used as a filming location for Mission: Impossible – Rogue Nation, Cinderella, The Libertine among others. Stanley Kubrick's Barry Lyndon was partly filmed at the palace, utilizing the lower water terrace. Other films shot at Blenheim Palace include Black Beauty, The Avengers, Young Winston, Hamlet, The Four Feathers and The Lost Prince.

=== Television ===
Architectural historian Dan Cruickshank selected the Palace as one of his four choices for the 2002 BBC television documentary series Britain's Best Buildings. In fiction, Inspector Morse used the Marlborough Maze. The Great Court featured in the American series The Royals and in the series finale of Endeavour. More recently the palace has featured in The Diplomat, Bridgerton, Season 3 and the spinoff Queen Charlotte: A Bridgerton Story. A Walkers advert featuring David Beckham, Victoria Beckham and Gary Lineker was filmed at the estate.

== Blenheim in art ==
The British painter John Piper (1903–1992) was commissioned to paint scenes in the grounds of the palace during the 1980s. In 2012, an exhibition of the artist's work entitled John Piper at Blenheim Palace was held in a room at the palace to commemorate the 20th anniversary of Piper's death.

The Blenheim Art Foundation hosts large-scale art exhibitions at the palace.
