= Balsan =

Balsan may refer to:

== People ==
- Étienne Balsan (1878–1953), French socialite
- Humbert Balsan (1954–2005), French film producer
- Jacques Balsan (1868–1956), French aviator and industrialist
- Louis Balsan (1911–1982), French bobsledder
- Václav Balšán, Czech racewalker

== Other uses ==
- Balsan (company), French textile manufacturer
- Balsan-dong, neighbourhood of Gangseo-gu in Seoul, South Korea
- Balsan Station, station on the Seoul Subway Line 5

== See also ==
- Balzan (disambiguation)
