= Augerville =

Augerville may refer to:

== Places ==
- Augerville, Illinois, United States
- Augerville, a neighborhood of Hamden, Connecticut, United States
- Château d'Augerville, France
- Augerville-la-Rivière, France
