= Château Saint-Georges Motel =

Château in Saint-Georges-Motel, France

Château de Saint-Georges-Motel
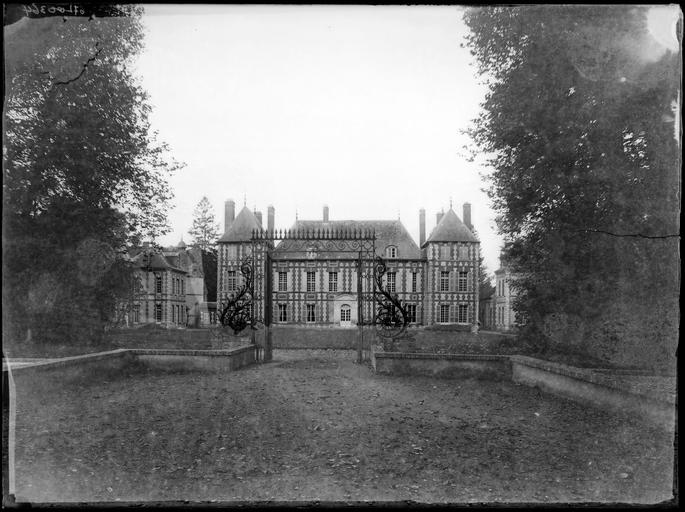
- The front elevation, c. 1900-1920

- Location within France
- 48°47′37″N 1°22′03″E
- Location: Saint-Georges-Motel, Eure, France

Site notes
- Owner: Private owner

Monument historique
- Designated: 9 June 1977

Château de Saint-Georges Motel is a château in Saint-Georges-Motel, in the Eure department in northern France, that was built in the early 17th century. The Château was listed as a French historical monument on 9 June 1977.

== History ==
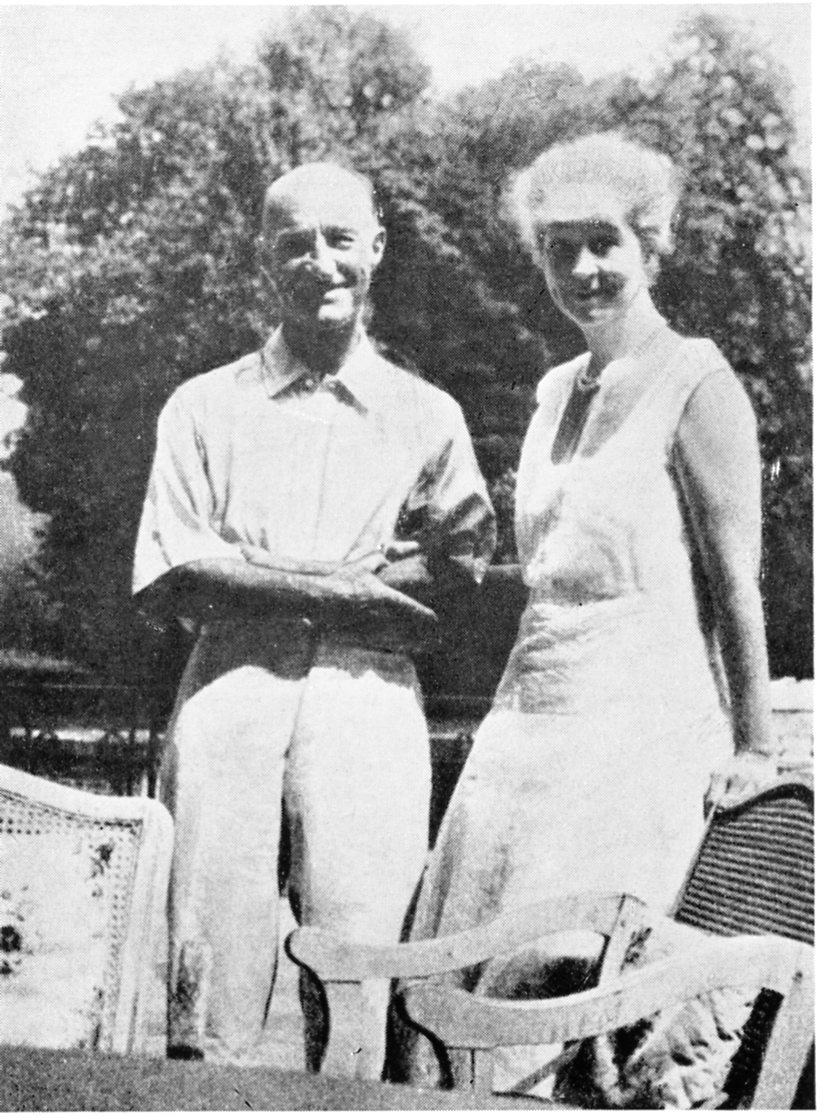
Jacques Balsan and Consuelo Vanderbilt Balsan (formerly the Duchess of Marlborough) in Saint-Georges-Motel.

In the middle of the 13th century, an old château belonging to Aimery de Muzy is mentioned in St. Georges-Motel that served as a residence for Eudes II Rigaud, the Archbishop of Rouen from 1247 to 1276. From 1427, the Motel lands were owned by the Chevalier Jehan de Pilliers and remained in the family until the French Revolution. In 1590, King Henry IV spent the night on the estate before winning the Battle of Ivry that united France. Eure is also home to the Château de la Héruppe and Le Breuil-Benoît Abbey.

The current château was built in the early 17th century and today is a 10,000-square-foot castle surrounded by a moat on a 235-acre property that includes eighteen outbuildings. The main building is flanked by two side pavilions, all covered by a steep slate roof. The façade is rubble stone framed by window openings of brick with dressed stone around the building edges.

In the 1922, the château was purchased as a summer house by American heiress Consuelo Vanderbilt when she was married to the French aviator and industrialist Jacques Balsan, after her divorce from Charles Spencer-Churchill, 9th Duke of Marlborough. (Note: During the Balsan years, Saint-Georges-Motel was home to another American heiress that married into the European aristocracy. The Countess de Viel Castel (formerly Annah Dillon Ripley), the daughter of Sidney Dillon Ripley and granddaughter of Henry Baldwin Hyde (the founder of Equitable Life Assurance), who married Count Pierre Joseph de Viel Castel; they lived at Château de la Héruppe in St. Georges-Motel.) During the Balsan years, the interiors of the château were redesigned by Maison Jansen, the Paris-based interior decoration office founded in 1880 by Dutch-born Jean-Henri Jansen.

While Consuelo owned the château, Prime Minister Winston Churchill was a frequent visitor. The artist Paul Maze, Churchill's friend and artistic mentor, had a studio in the Château's mill, the Moulin de Montreuil. Consuelo's ownership of the château inspired her mother, Alva Belmont, to purchase the Château d'Augerville in Augerville-la-Rivière. After Paris fell in June 1940 during World War II, Jacques and Consuelo left from the château, beginning their journey across France to Spain, where they eventually traveled to New York aboard a Pan Am Clipper from Lisbon.

After WWII, the château passed to heiress and sculptor Diana Guest Manning who was a relation of the Spencer-Churchill family. She was a daughter of Freddie Guest and a granddaughter of Henry Phipps Jr.

In 1978, the château was again owned by Americans who listed the residence for sale for 10 million French francs. In the late 1980s, Catherine Hamilton, president of the American Friends of Versailles, and her husband, David Hamilton, a Chicago-based businessman, purchased the château for $6 million. In 2017, they listed it for sale for $8.21 million.

=== Park ===
The park was designed by prominent landscape architect André Le Nôtre. During the Second Empire, the park was transformed by Louis-Sulpice Varé, designer of the Bois de Boulogne and the park at Château de Châtenay-en-France and Château de Bandeville for the Comte de Pourtalès-Gorgier. In the 20th century, landscape designer Achille Duchêne further transformed the park. From 1930 to 1935 British garden designer Norah Lindsay worked alongside the Balsans to plant herbaceous borders and shrubs.

=== Historic monument ===
The Château de Saint-Georges-Motel was listed as a historical monument on 9 June 1977, including the moat, the water mirrors, the park and its central alley.

== Gallery ==
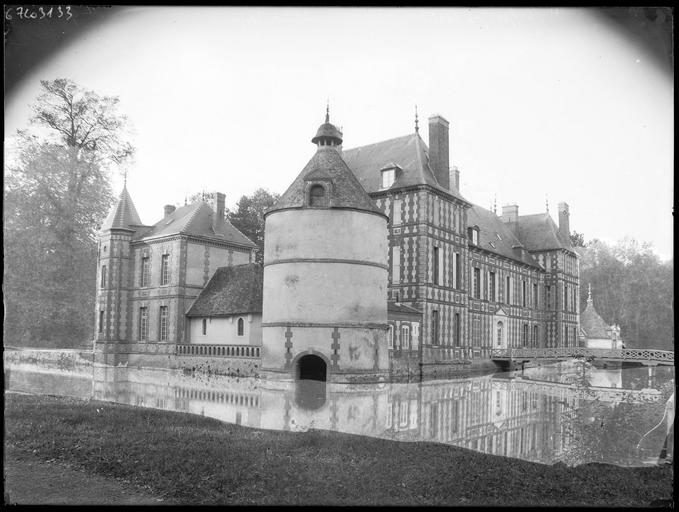
Southeastern view of the château surrounded by a moat, c. 1900-1920

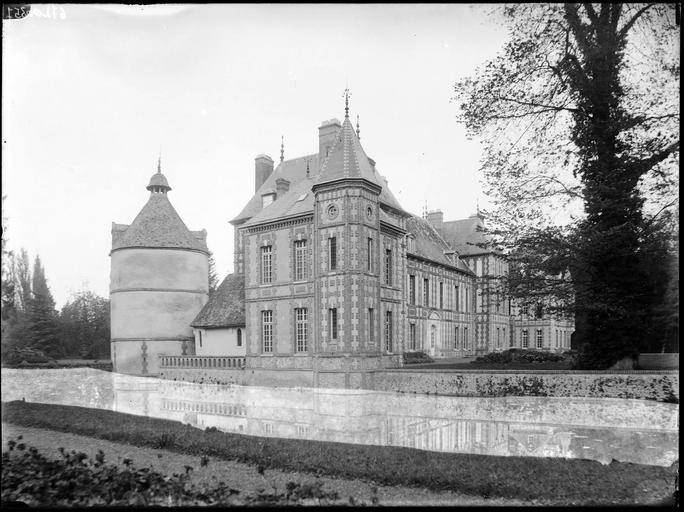
The château surrounded by a moat, c. 1900-1920
