= Balzan (disambiguation) =

Balzan is a small village in Malta.

Balzan may also refer to:

- Balzan Prize, an award for outstanding achievements in the fields of humanities, natural sciences, culture, as well as for endeavours for peace and the brotherhood of man
- Balzan Of The Cat People, a short lived series of three books by Gerard F. Conway, writing as Wallace Moore

== People ==
- Alessandro Balzan (born 1980), Italian auto racing driver
- Maximilian Balzan (1637–1711), Maltese mediaeval philosopher

== See also ==
- Balsan (disambiguation)
