= Urbana Township =

Urbana Township may refer to the following townships in the United States:

- Urbana Township, Champaign County, Illinois
- Urbana Township, Champaign County, Ohio
