= Saint-Georges-Motel =

- Commune
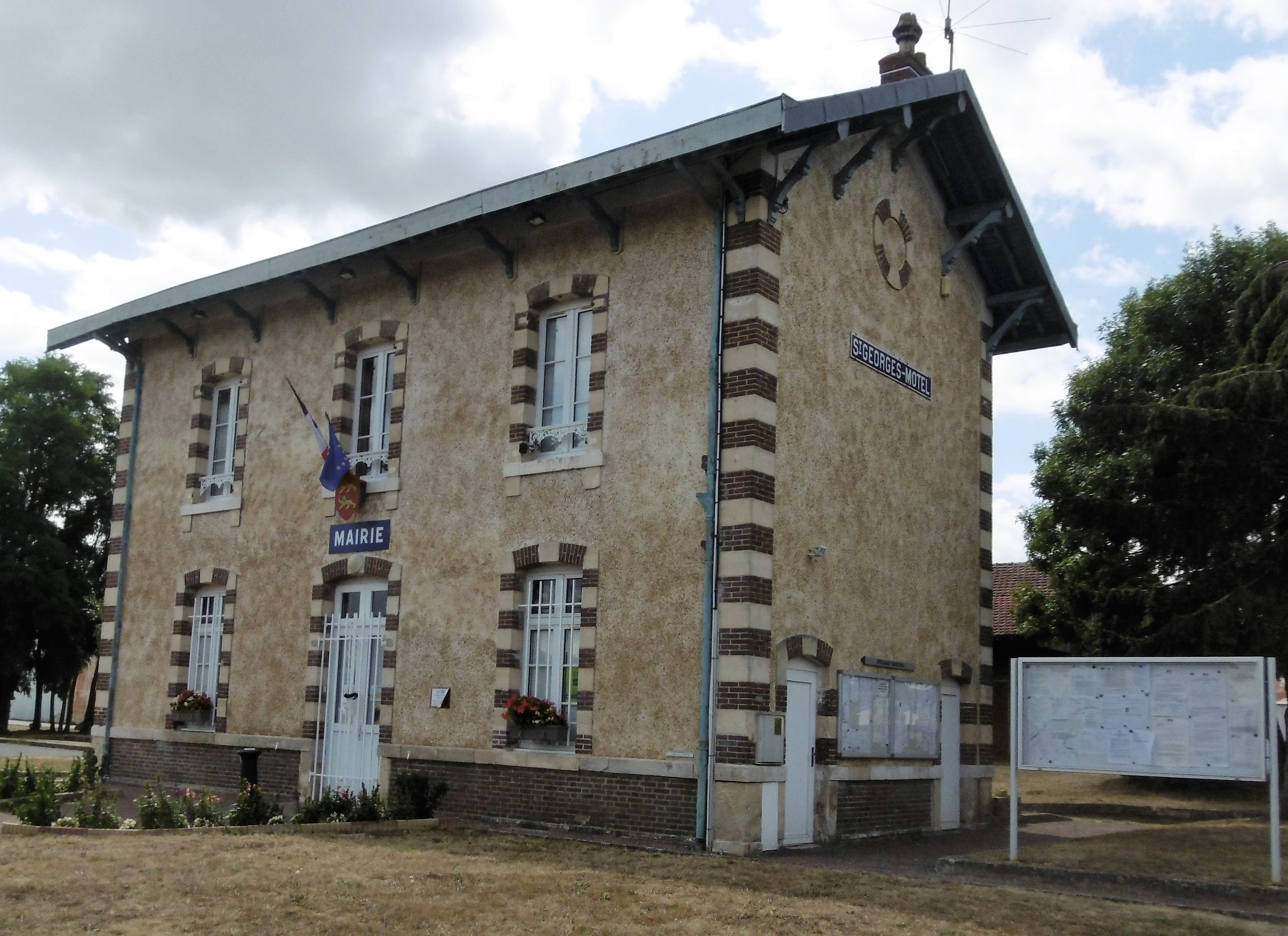
- Town hall

- Coat of arms
- Location of Saint-Georges-Motel
- Location within France Location within Normandy
- Coordinates: 48°47′37″N 1°22′03″E
- Country: France
- Region: Normandy
- Department: Eure
- Arrondissement: Évreux
- Canton: Saint-André-de-l'Eure
- Intercommunality: CA Pays de Dreux

Government
  - Mayor (2020–2026): Jean-Louis Guirlin
- Area^{1}: 4.97 km^{2} (1.92 sq mi)
- Elevation: 120 m (390 ft)
- Highest elevation: 132 m (433 ft)
- Lowest elevation: 67 m (220 ft)
- Population (2023): 880
  - Density: 180/km^{2} (460/sq mi)
- Time zone: UTC+01:00 (CET)
  - Summer (DST): UTC+02:00 (CEST)
- INSEE/Postal code: 27543 /27710
- ^{1} French Land Register data, which excludes lakes, ponds, glaciers > 1 km^{2} (0.386 sq mi or 247 acres) and river estuaries.

Saint-Georges-Motel (French pronunciation: [sɛ̃ ʒɔʁʒ mɔtɛl]) is a commune in the Eure department in Normandy in northern France.

== Population ==
Historical population
Year	Pop.	±% p.a.
1968	567	—
1975	572	+0.13%
1982	630	+1.39%
1990	800	+3.03%
1999	950	+1.93%
2007	953	+0.04%
2012	942	−0.23%
2017	889	−1.15%
2023	880	−0.17%
Source: INSEE

== Notable residents ==
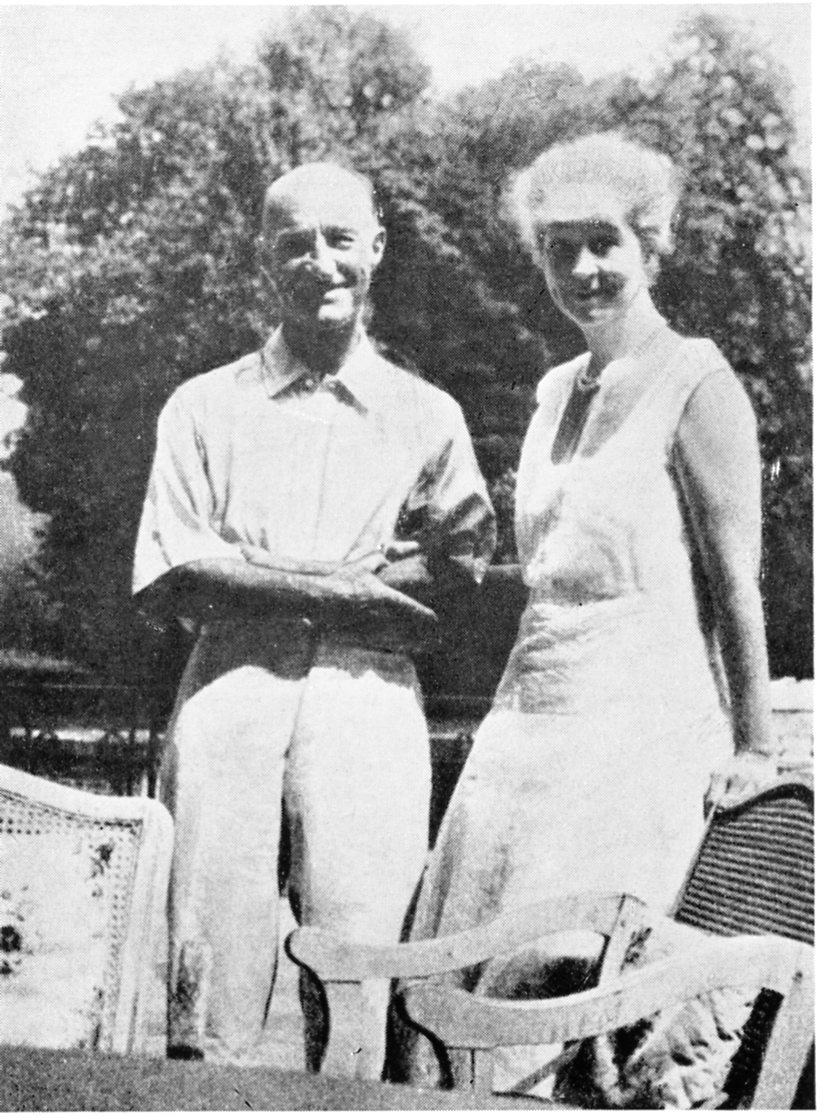
Jacques Balsan and Consuelo Vanderbilt Balsan (formerly the Duchess of Marlborough) in Saint-Georges-Motel.

The early 17th-century Château Saint-Georges-Motel, is a 10,000-square-foot castle surrounded by a moat on a 235-acre property that includes eighteen outbuildings. King Henry IV spent the night on the estate before winning the Battle of Ivry that united France.

In the 1920s, the château was purchased as a summer house by American heiress Consuelo Vanderbilt when she was married to the French aviator and industrialist Jacques Balsan, after her divorce from Charles Spencer-Churchill, 9th Duke of Marlborough. While Consuelo owned the château, Prime Minister Winston Churchill was a frequent visitor. Vanderbilt's ownership of the château inspired her mother, Alva Belmont to purchase the Château d'Augerville.

The château was listed for sale for $8.21 million in 2017 by its then owners, Catherine Hamilton, president of the American Friends of Versailles, and her husband, David Hamilton, a Houston-raised, Chicago-based businessman. They purchased the château in the late 1980s for $6 million.

== See also ==
- Communes of the Eure department
