= Étienne Balsan =

French socialite (1878–1953)

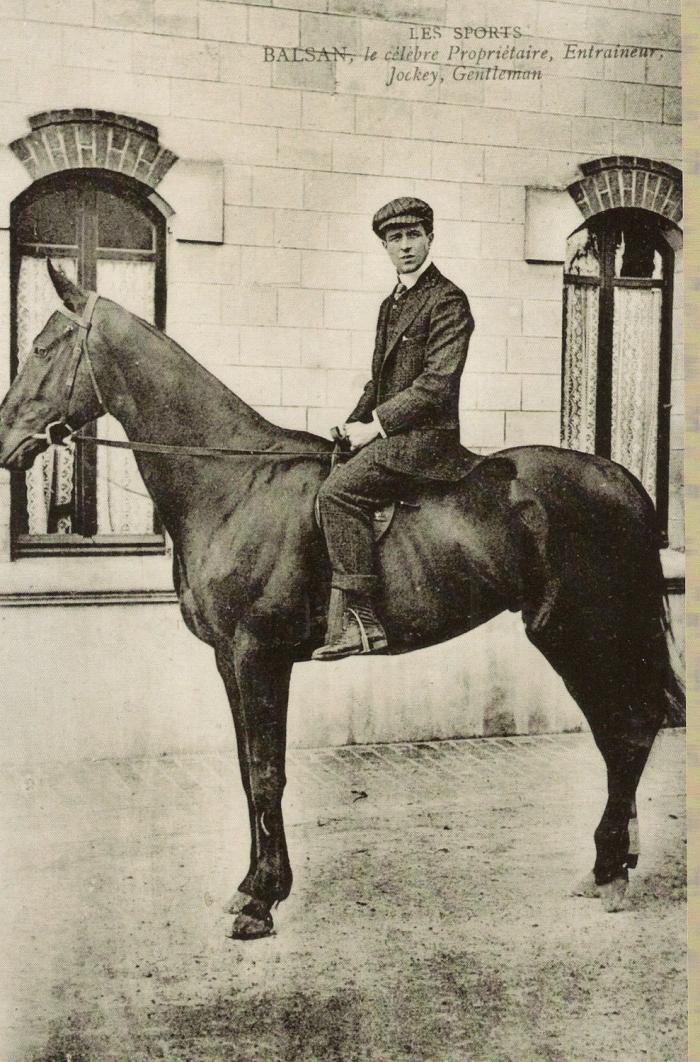
Étienne Balsan

Étienne Balsan (February 11, 1878 – 1953) was born in Paris, France, as Fulcran Étienne Balsan.

== Life ==
A French socialite and heir, he was born into the family of wealthy industrialists from Châteauroux (Indre) who created Balsan (Company) and provided the army with uniforms and originated the famous cloth known as "blue horizon." Balsan is best known in the present day as having kept Coco Chanel as his mistress. Among his other lovers was famed French actress and courtesan Émilienne d'Alençon.

While the Balsan family was a part of the upper class circle, Étienne (and his brother Jacques Balsan) were neither landed gentry nor titled aristocrat. An officer in the cavalry, he renounced his career, to breed horses and participate in races. A polo-player, he owned the estate Chateau de Royallieu (destroyed during World War II) near Compiègne (Oise). The chateau was located near the site of the Prix de Royallieu, a Group 2 flat horse race, which has been active since 1922.

He noticed Coco Chanel in Moulins (Allier) and became her lover. They remained friends throughout their lives. In 1909, when Chanel settled in Paris, he lent her his bachelor flat on the ground floor, 160 Boulevard Malesherbes, and helped her to open a boutique in Deauville. Balsan introduced her to Paris society, including Englishman Arthur "Boy" Capel who later became Chanel's lover, and who helped Chanel to finance her early fashion business.

His brother, Jacques Balsan, married Consuelo Vanderbilt, the former Duchess of Marlborough.

== In popular culture ==
Balsan was portrayed by actor Benoît Poelvoorde in the feature film Coco avant Chanel (2009), by Sagamore Stévenin in the television film Coco Chanel (2008), and by Rutger Hauer in the 1981 release Chanel Solitaire.
