= Urbana Township, Champaign County, Illinois =

Urbana Township
- Township
- Location in Champaign County

- Champaign County's location in Illinois
- Coordinates: 40°05′54″N 88°10′24″W
- Country: United States
- State: Illinois
- County: Champaign
- Established: November 8, 1859

Area
  - Total: 23.84 sq mi (61.7 km^{2})
  - Land: 23.79 sq mi (61.6 km^{2})
  - Water: 0.04 sq mi (0.10 km^{2}) 0.18%
- Elevation: 689 ft (210 m)

Population (2020)
  - Total: 7,556
  - Density: 317.6/sq mi (122.6/km^{2})
- Time zone: UTC-6 (CST)
  - Summer (DST): UTC-5 (CDT)
- FIPS code: 17-019-77018

Urbana Township is a township in Champaign County, Illinois, USA. As of the 2020 census, its population was 7,556 and it contained 3,463 housing units.

== Geography ==
Urbana is Township 19 North, Range 9 East of the Third Principal Meridian.

According to the 2021 census gazetteer files, Urbana Township has a total area of 23.84 square miles (61.75 km^{2}), of which 23.79 square miles (61.62 km^{2}) (or 99.82%) is land and 0.04 square miles (0.10 km^{2}) (or 0.18%) is water.

Portions of the township have been removed through annexation with the cities of Champaign and Urbana.

The University of Illinois South Farms occupy a large area south of the cities.

Yankee Ridge, a glacial moraine, extends through the central part of the township. Glacial rocks and large boulders frequently turn up on farms and construction sites in this area.

The Champaign County Poor Farm was in Section 16. The site on East Main Street in Urbana now has county offices, jail and nursing home.

The western section of the Kickapoo Rail Trail follows the former Big Four—Conrail System railroad right–of–way along U.S. Route 150 from the City of Urbana to the Village of St. Joseph. Going east from Urbana landmarks along the trail include Urbana Walmart, John Deere implement dealer, Cottonwood Road (CR 1700E), CR 1800E, Mt. Olive Cemetery, Mayview, Sellers Road (CR 1900E), Full's Siding elevator, CR 1975E, CR 2075E, Corteva (Pioneer Supply) seed company, Salt Fork Paintball, the baseball field, Salt Fork River bridge, St. Joseph water tower, Wheelhouse restaurant and Main Street Mall, St. Joseph business district and elevator.

=== Unincorporated towns ===
- Augerville

(This list is based on USGS data and may include former settlements.)

=== Cemeteries ===
The township contains several cemeteries: Eastlawn Burial Park and adjacent Greenwood—Harvey Cemetery (Section 9), Lincoln Memorial Gardens and Woodlawn (both Section 5), Mount Hope Cemetery and adjacent Roselawn (both Section 18). All are now in the cities of Urbana and Champaign.

Potawatomi burial ground and Old Soldier's Burial Ground (Section 8). Burials were transferred to Mount Hope in 1902. The site is now Leal Park along University Avenue in Urbana.

Champaign County Poor Farm cemetery (Section 16) was in use until the 1930s. During construction in 1970 the remains were moved into one concrete vault with a single marker located north of East Washington Street and Country Squire Drive, Urbana.

Historic cemeteries (these are no longer visible): Dunkard Burial Ground (Section 12), Cloyd Cemetery (Section 12), Isham Cook family plot (Section 5), Thomas Rowland burial plot (Section 1).

=== Churches ===
Historic Dunkard Church was in Section 12 in 1893.

=== Grain Elevators ===
Myra Station elevator (Section 22) was built along the Wabash—Norfolk Southern railroad spur running between Urbana and Sidney 1881−1990. The elevator was operated by Jacob G. Holterman until December 1903 when it was taken over by Alfred Edmond Silver as Silver Elevator Company. The concrete elevator at the intersection of Illinois Route 130 and East Windsor Road was demolished in 1986.

In 1881 the Wabash railroad built a spur from Sidney to Urbana on the route of a vanished 1838 unpaved dirt road going from Paris in Edgar County to Urbana. In 1854 the road was part of the mail stage route from Urbana to Vincennes, Indiana. The road disappeared when township roads on section lines were established in 1860. Myra Station depot on the opposite side of the tracks from the elevator was named for Myra Silver (1834−1903) who owned a farm south of the depot in Section 26. On 30 November 1903 she was killed by a train approaching from the southeast as she was crossing the tracks to board at the station. The accident was described in some detail by one of the local newspapers. The railroad spur was abandoned and the tracks taken up in the 1990s.

Urbana elevator (Section 8). H.R. Stinespring Coal, Flour and Feed elevator at 202 North Market Street (Broadway Avenue) in 1913 was south of both the Big Four and Wabash railroad tracks. The Wabash depot was at 220 North Market Street. The wooden elevator was still standing in 1968, but has since been demolished.

=== Mills ===
Runnel Fielder built a mill on the Saline Branch in Section 11 in the 1820s.

Charles Heptonstall built a water-powered flour and sawmill on the Saline Branch about a mile downstream from the Urbana settlement in 1838. A Methodist camp meeting was held at the mill in 1839. The mill later disappeared, probably washed away in a flood.

Jacob Mootz built a water-powered grist and sawmill on the Saline Branch around the year 1842. It was on land owned by Col. Matthew W. Busey in Section 8. The creek was dammed west of Market Street (Broadway Avenue) to form a millpond. The millpond and environs eventually evolved into Crystal Lake Park. Remains of the dam were still visible when Crystal Lake became an Urbana park in 1908. The lake occupies the original channel of the Saline Branch, cut off when the creek was straightened and channelized into its present course in 1909.

=== Schools ===
Rural schools in the township included Blackberry School (Section 1), Cottonwood School (Section 14), Perkins School (Section 4), Silver School (Section 26), Star School (Section 28), Union School No. 2 (Section 19), Willard School (Section 23).

The rural schools were all demolished or converted to residences.

=== Public transit ===
- Champaign–Urbana Mass Transit District

=== Major highways ===
- Interstate 74
- U.S. Route 45
- U.S. Route 150
- Illinois State Route 130

=== Airports and landing strips ===
- Day Aero-Place

== Demographics ==
As of the 2020 census there were 7,556 people, 3,202 households, and 1,715 families residing in the township. The population density was 317.00 inhabitants per square mile (122.39/km^{2}). There were 3,463 housing units at an average density of 145.28 per square mile (56.09/km^{2}). The racial makeup of the township was 57.72% White, 14.43% African American, 1.88% Native American, 3.14% Asian, 0.03% Pacific Islander, 12.20% from other races, and 10.61% from two or more races. Hispanic or Latino of any race were 21.28% of the population.

There were 3,202 households, out of which 22.30% had children under the age of 18 living with them, 39.91% were married couples living together, 9.65% had a female householder with no spouse present, and 46.44% were non-families. 34.80% of all households were made up of individuals, and 12.10% had someone living alone who was 65 years of age or older. The average household size was 2.26 and the average family size was 2.91.

The township's age distribution consisted of 18.0% under the age of 18, 6.0% from 18 to 24, 23.5% from 25 to 44, 30.1% from 45 to 64, and 22.5% who were 65 years of age or older. The median age was 45.6 years. For every 100 females, there were 76.2 males. For every 100 females age 18 and over, there were 72.0 males.

The median income for a household in the township was $50,128, and the median income for a family was $58,875. Males had a median income of $27,459 versus $28,488 for females. The per capita income for the township was $28,238. About 15.0% of families and 17.4% of the population were below the poverty line, including 31.9% of those under age 18 and 5.5% of those age 65 or over.

Historical population
Census	Pop.	Note	%±
2010	7,451		—
2020	7,556		1.4%
U.S. Decennial Census
