= Jacques Balsan =

French aviator and businessman (1868–1956)

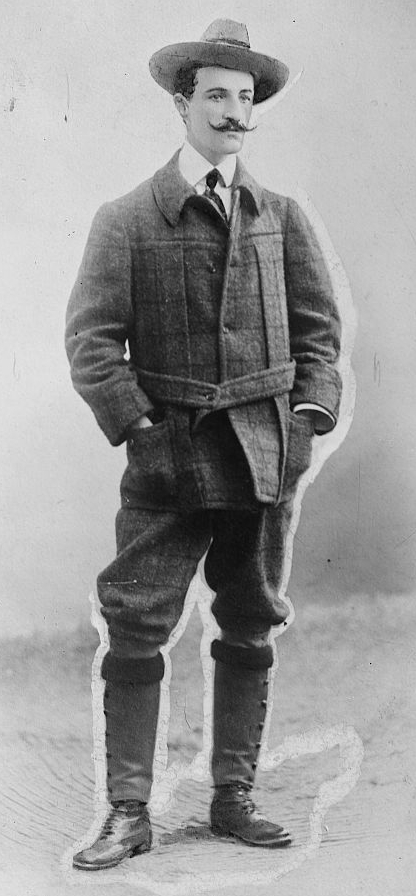
- Jacques Balsan
- Born: September 16, 1868; Châteauroux, France
- Died: November 4, 1956 (aged 88)
- Occupations: aviator and industrialist

Louis Jacques Balsan (September 16, 1868 – November 4, 1956) was a French aviator and industrialist, who was the second husband of society beauty Consuelo Vanderbilt, Duchess of Marlborough. He married her immediately after her divorce from the 9th Duke of Marlborough in 1921.

== Early life ==
Balsan was born on September 16, 1868, in Châteauroux, France. He was the son of Auguste Balsan and Marie (née Dupuytren). Among his siblings was brother Étienne Balsan, the first patron of Coco Chanel, and sister, Viscountess de Villeneuve-Bargemon of Davenescourt, France.

Through his mother, he was descended from Guillaume Dupuytren, the anatomist and surgeon who treated Napoleon Bonaparte and, today, is best known today for his description of Dupuytren's contracture, which is named after him and which he first operated on in 1831 and published in The Lancet in 1834.

Jacques Balsan came from a manufacturing family who created and ran Balsan (Company) which supplied the French Army with uniforms from the time of Napoleon onwards which were the origin of the famous cloth "the blue horizon". The family's textile factories were situated at Châteauroux.

== Career ==
At the age of 24, Jacques Balsan entered the family business and traveled the world, buying wool.

Passionate about ballooning, in September 1900, while in the balloon St. Louis that was inflated with illuminating gas, he remained aloft for 39 hours and nine minutes. Later that same month, he earned the record for the highest altitude flight at the "Exposition Universelle", by rising to a height of 8,558 meters; the following month traveling over 1,345 kilometers (roughly 850 miles) from Vincennes to Opoezno, Russia.

A pioneer of flying, he bought his first aircraft in 1905, a Chanute-type glider, and an airplane in 1909 and obtained a Number 22 license to pilot aircraft. He also took part in aviation experiments with the Wright brothers in Biarritz and in 1910, constructed his own small plane. In February 1910, in his Blériot monoplane, he won the "Le Prix d'Héliopolis" (in Egypt).

=== Military service ===
During World War I, he helped organize the Lafayette Escadrille along with William K. Vanderbilt and Dr. Edmund Gros, also a founder of the American Hospital of Paris and organizer of the American Ambulance Field Service. Later, General Maunoury gave him charge of the aerial reconnaissance of the site of the First Battle of the Marne. In 1918, he went to London as chief of the French Air Force mission. By the end of the war, he was promoted to the rank of lieutenant colonel.

During World War II, he joined the Free French forces in London, taking part in the operations that liberated southern France.

== Personal life ==
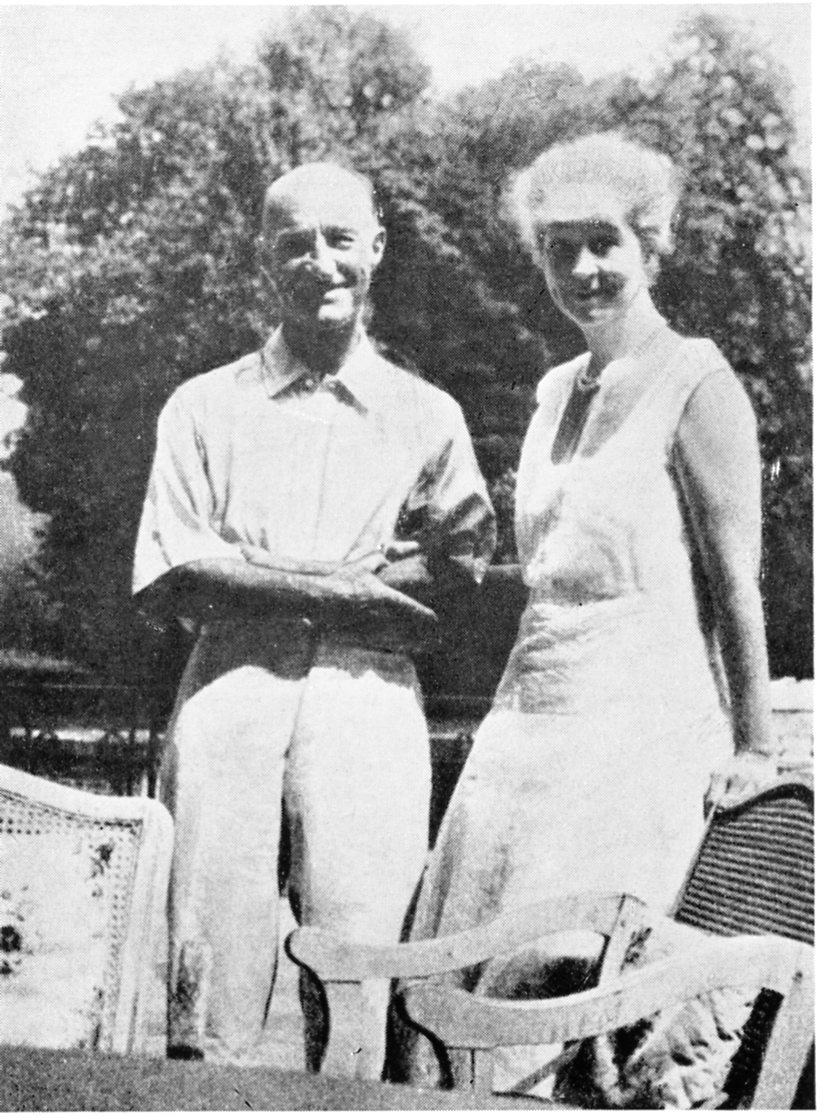
Jacques and Consuelo at St-Georges-Motel, between 1930 and 1935.

Balsan first saw and immediately fell in love with wealthy American Consuelo Vanderbilt when she was 17, before her marriage to the 9th Duke of Marlborough. She was considered the most eligible woman of the late Victorian Age. A memorable portrait of her by Carolus Duran hangs at Blenheim Palace. Balsan married her on 4 July 1921 (when he was 52 and she was 44), after which she was styled 'Mme Jacques Balsan', until her death in 1964. Known for his attention to her, it was a very happy marriage. Consuelo wrote to her close friend Winston Churchill, during World War II, while Balsan worked with the Free French in London, to request his special protection and safe return. Churchill obligingly facilitated his safe return to America.

The Balsans were hosting Winston and Clementine Churchill in September 1939, just before the outbreak of war at their chateau Saint-Georges-Motel, near Dreux north of Paris. They also owned a property in Èze (Alpes-Maritimes) where they received a number of celebrities such as the Duke of Connaught, a son of Queen Victoria, Jagatjit Singh, Maharajah of Kapurthala, and Charlie Chaplin. Balsan supported his wife's work with French children. They lived in their hotel particulier in Paris, at 9 Avenue Charles-Floquet.

Consuelo Vanderbilt's ghosted autobiography The Glitter and The Gold refers to her time with Balsan as "gold", as opposed to the "glitter" of her earlier, aristocratic marriage. In it, she tells the story of the Balsans' daring escape from the Nazis through Spain to Portugal and eventually to America, where they lived for the rest of their lives.

Jacques Balsan died on November 4, 1956, at his home, 1 Sutton Place, New York City, in America. His death occurred less than a month after that of his stepson, Lord Ivor Spencer-Churchill, at the age of 57, in London on September 17, 1956. Balsan was buried in Paris. His widow died on December 6, 1964, at her home in Southampton, New York, and was buried next to Lord Ivor.

== Honours ==
- Officer of the National Order of the Legion of Honour ( 1913 Chevalier (civil) and 1925 (Officier) )
- Colonial Medal (1914, Morocco)
- Croix de guerre 1914-1918 (1917, with palm)
- Companion of the Order of St Michael and St George (1917, United Kingdom)
- Aeronautical Medal (1952, Santos Dumont promotion)
- Commemorative medal for voluntary service in Free France (1946)

== See also ==
- List of pilots awarded an Aviator's Certificate by the Aéro-Club de France in 1910
