= Balzan of the Cat People =

Balzan Of The Cat People is a series of three books by Gerard F. Conway, writing as Wallace Moore. Published by the now defunct Pinnacle Books in 1975, and billed on the cover as "the Tarzan of outer space", these science fiction epics fit into the genre of Sword and Planet.

1. The Blood Stones
2. The Caves Of Madness
3. The Lights Of Zetar

The protagonist is a young human who was accidentally 'transferred' as a baby to an alien world during the trip to Mars in the 26th century. The planet has green skies, 2 moons, and several different sentient species. The similarity to Tarzan of the Apes is rather obvious, as the young Brian Rice was rescued from the stasis cube in the crashed spacecraft by the Endorian 'Cat People'.

It has been derided on the internet as 'cretinous swill meant for slack jawed teenagers.' Balzan is well armed with his therb, a 40-foot whip with a hollow handle containing a highly virulent poison and a wicked barb on the business end, with the poison fed through the whip by capillary action. One scratch and an opponent is dead. He has a neutron sword for close in fighting.
