= Consuelo Vanderbilt =

American socialite (1877–1964)

Consuelo Vanderbilt Balsan
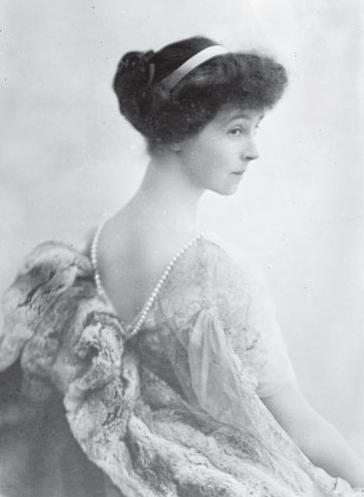
- The Duchess of Marlborough (c. 1900–1905)
- Born: Consuelo Vanderbilt; 2 March 1877; Manhattan, New York City, U.S.
- Died: 6 December 1964 (aged 87); Southampton, New York, U.S.
- Burial place: St Martin's Church, Bladon, Oxfordshire, England
- Spouses: Charles Spencer-Churchill, 9th Duke of Marlborough (m. 1895; div. 1921) Jacques Balsan (m. 1921; died 1956)
- Children: John Spencer-Churchill, 10th Duke of Marlborough; Lord Ivor Spencer-Churchill
- Parents: William Kissam Vanderbilt (father); Alva Erskine Smith (mother)
- Family: Vanderbilt family

Consuelo Vanderbilt Balsan (2 March 1877 – 6 December 1964) was an American socialite. She was a member of the Vanderbilt family and only daughter of William Kissam Vanderbilt and Alva Erskine Smith. Her first marriage to Charles Spencer-Churchill, 9th Duke of Marlborough has become a well-known example of the advantageous but loveless marriages common during the Gilded Age. The Duke obtained a large dowry through the marriage and reportedly told her – on their honeymoon — that he had married her only "because he felt obliged to save Blenheim," his ancestral home.

During the marriage, she became a popular and influential duchess. For much of their 25-year marriage, the Marlboroughs lived separately. After an official separation in 1906, the couple was divorced in 1921, followed by an annulment in 1926. Her first marriage produced two sons, John (the 10th Duke) and Ivor. She went on to marry the wealthy French aviator Jacques Balsan and continued her charitable endeavours. Consuelo and Balsan lived in France prior to World War II, then moved to the United States. As stipulated in her will, she was buried at St Martin's Church, the parish church for Blenheim Palace.

== Early life ==
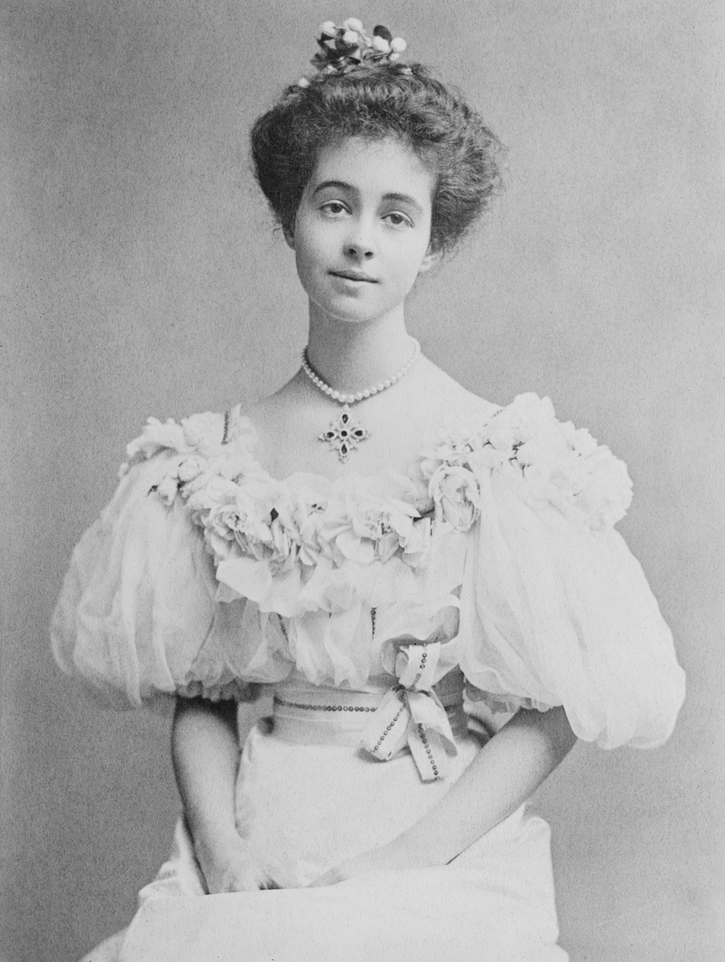
Consuelo as a teenager (c. 1890s)

Born in New York City, Consuelo was the only daughter and eldest child of William Kissam Vanderbilt, a New York railroad millionaire, and his first wife, Alva Erskine Smith, a Southern belle, budding suffragist, and daughter of Murray Forbes Smith. Consuelo's Spanish name was in honor of her godmother, Consuelo Yznaga, a half-Cuban, half-American socialite who had created a social stir in 1876 when she married the fortune-hunting George Montagu, Viscount Mandeville (later 8th Duke of Manchester), a union of Old World aristocracy and New World money.

Consuelo was largely dominated by her mother, who was determined that her daughter would make a grand match like that of her famous namesake. In her autobiography, Consuelo described how she was required to wear a steel rod, which ran down her spine and fastened around her waist and over her shoulders, to improve her posture. She was educated entirely at home by governesses and tutors, and learned foreign languages at an early age. Her mother whipped her with a riding crop for minor infractions, and when, as a teenager, Consuelo objected to the clothing her mother had selected for her, Alva told her that "I do the thinking, you do as you are told".

Like her godmother, Consuelo attracted numerous title-bearing suitors anxious to trade social position for cash. Her mother reportedly received at least five proposals for her hand. Consuelo was allowed to consider the proposal of just one of the men, Prince Francis Joseph of Battenberg, but she developed an instant aversion to him. None of the others, however, was good enough for Alva, herself the daughter of a cotton broker.

Consuelo was considered a great beauty, with a face compelling enough to cause the playwright Sir James Barrie, author of Peter Pan, to write: "I would stand all day in the street to see Consuelo Marlborough get into her carriage." Oxford undergraduate Guy Fortescue later described how he and his friends were captivated by her "piquante oval face perched upon a long slender neck, her enormous dark eyes fringed with curling lashes, her dimples, and her tiny teeth when she smiled". She came to embody the "slim, tight look" that was in vogue during the Edwardian era.

== First marriage ==
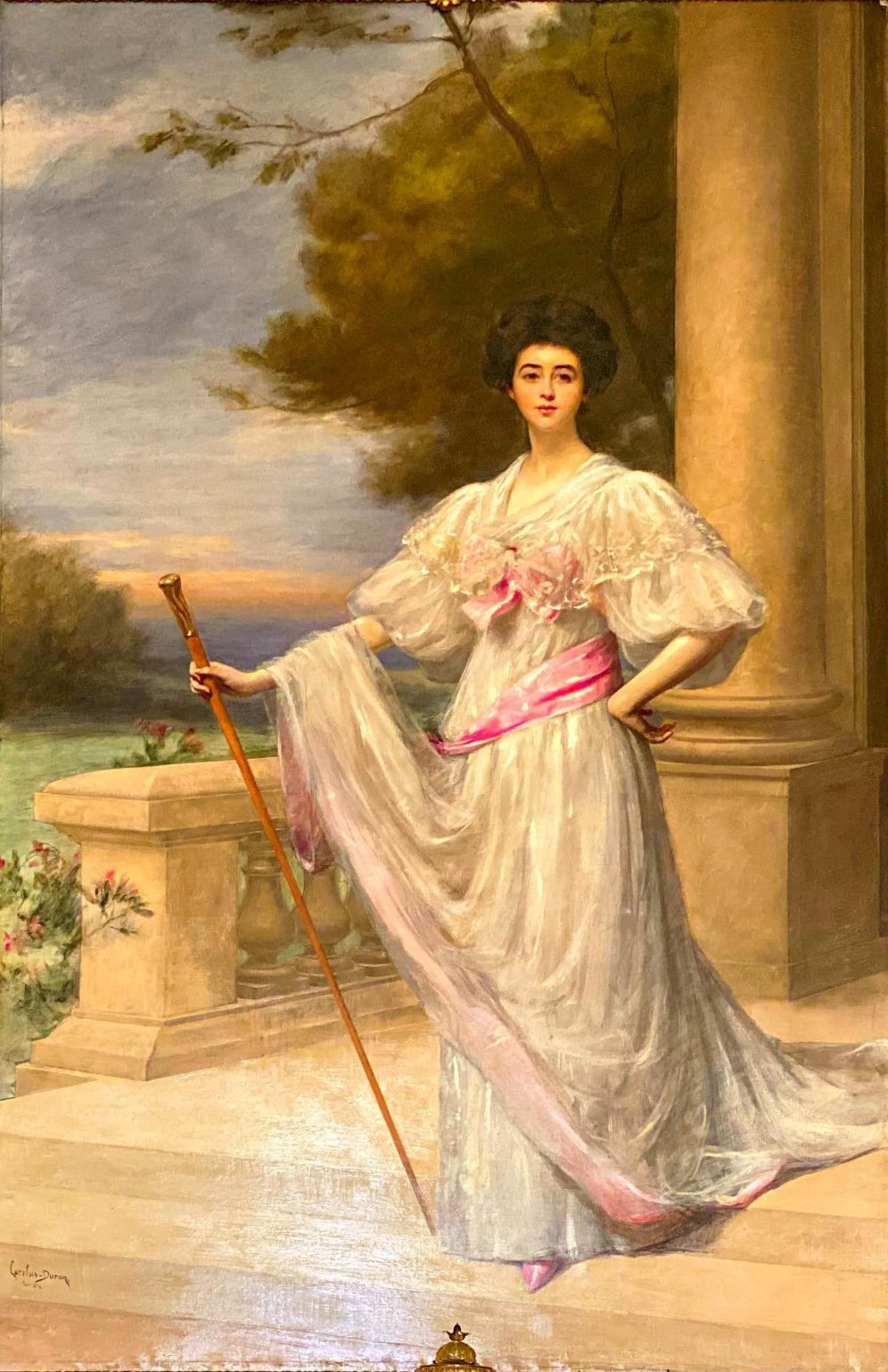
The Duchess of Marlborough, by Carolus-Duran (1895)

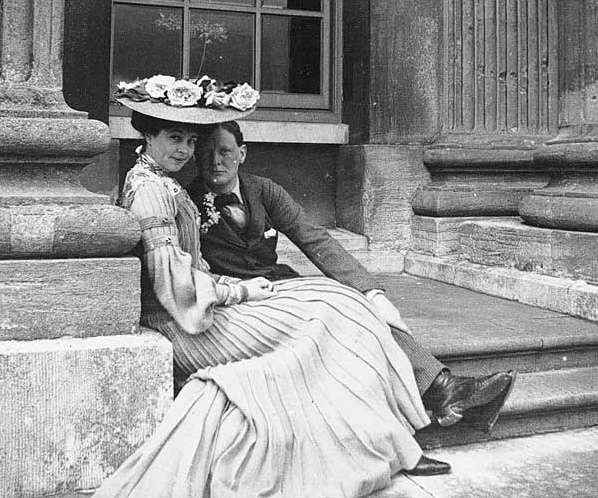
Consuelo and Winston Churchill at Blenheim Palace (1902)

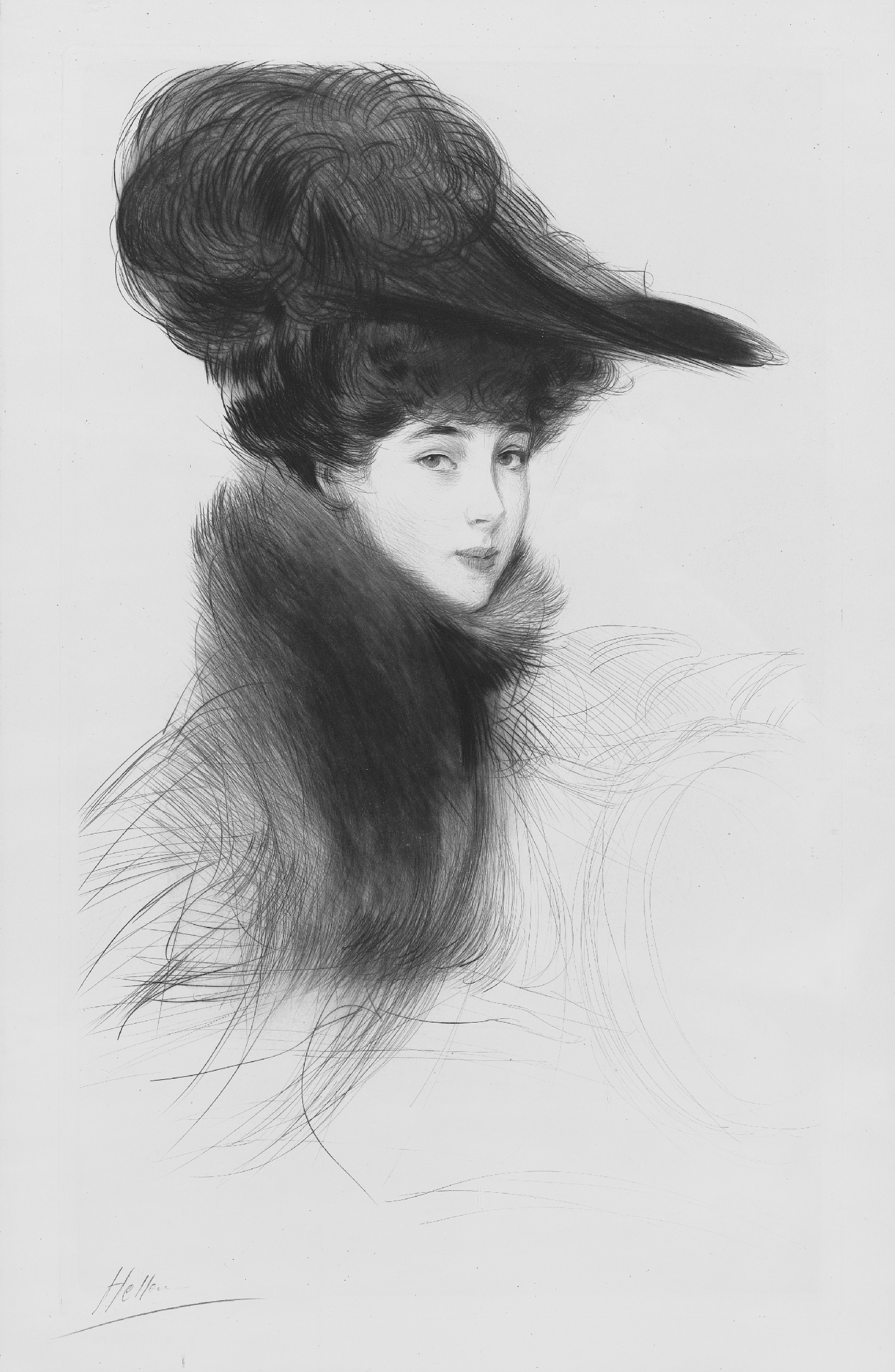
The Duchess of Marlborough, by Paul César Helleu (c. 1903)

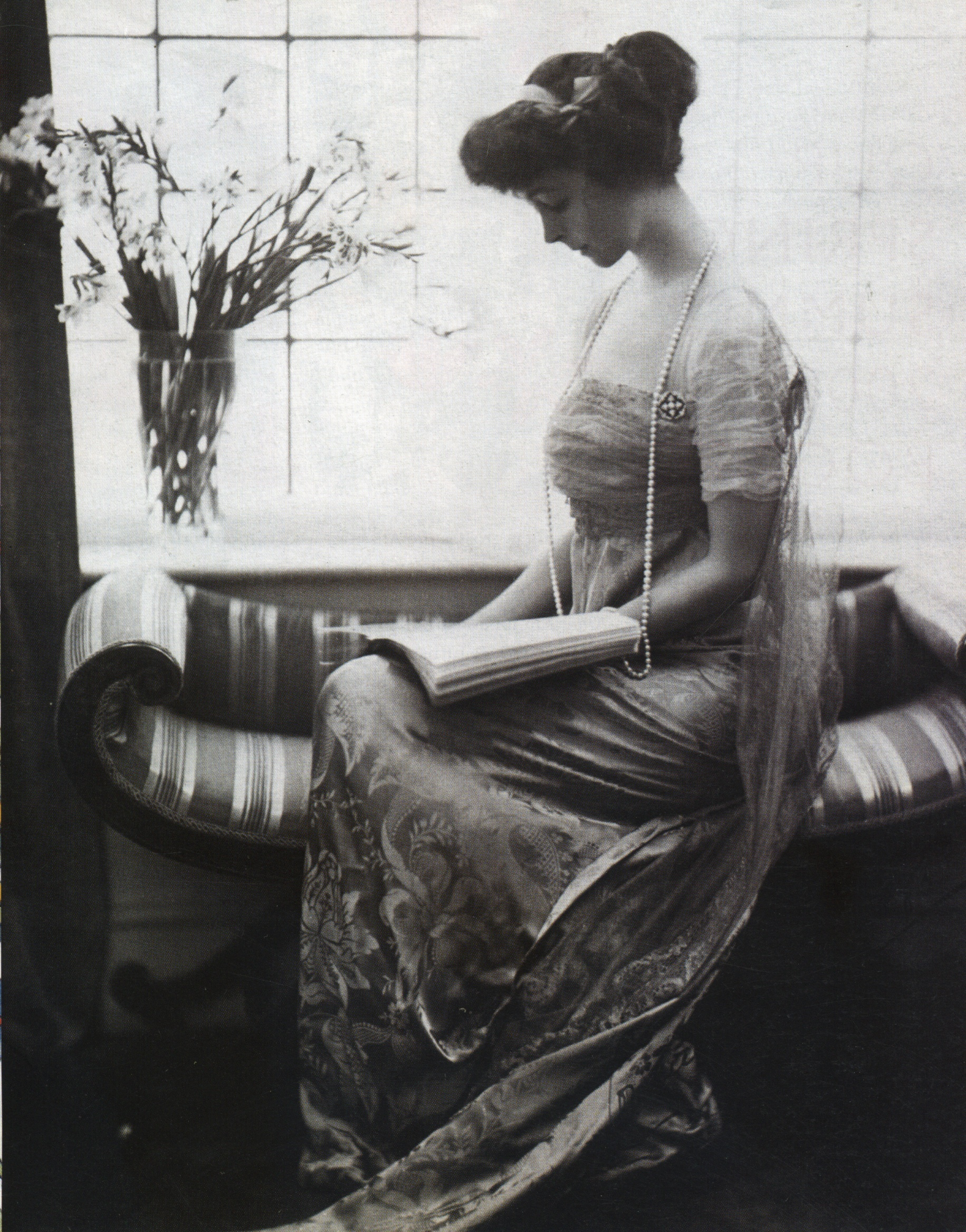
Consuelo (c. 1910)

Determined to secure the highest-ranking husband possible for her only daughter, a union that would emphasize the preeminence of the Vanderbilt family, Alva engineered a meeting between Consuelo and the indebted, titled Charles Spencer-Churchill, 9th Duke of Marlborough, chatelain of Blenheim Palace. The matchmaker was Lady Paget, the wife of Sir Arthur Paget. Born as Mary "Minnie" Stevens, Lady Paget was the daughter of Marietta Reed Stevens, the socially ambitious widow of American hotel entrepreneur Paran Stevens, who had successfully obtained admittance to the exclusive New York society of the fabled "Four Hundred". Lady Paget, always short of money, became a sort of international marital agent, introducing eligible American heiresses to British noblemen.

Consuelo had no interest in the Duke, being secretly engaged to Winthrop Rutherfurd, an American socialite 15 years her senior. Her mother begged, and then ultimately ordered her daughter to marry the Duke. When Consuelo – a docile teenager known only for her obedience to her fearsome mother – made plans to elope, she was locked in her room as Alva threatened to murder Rutherfurd. Consuelo refused until it was claimed that Alva's health was being undermined by Consuelo's stubbornness, and she appeared to be at death's door. Alva made an astonishing recovery from her supposed illness, and when the wedding took place, Consuelo stood at the altar reportedly weeping behind her veil. The Duke, for his part, allegedly gave up the woman he loved back in England and collected $2,500,000 ($91,600,000 in 2025 dollars) in railroad stock as a marriage settlement.

Consuelo married the Duke at Saint Thomas Church in Manhattan, on 6 November 1895. They had two sons, John Albert Edward William Spencer-Churchill, Marquess of Blandford (later 10th Duke of Marlborough and a godson of the future King Edward VII) in 1897, and Lord Ivor Charles Spencer-Churchill in 1898.

The new Duchess was adored by the poor and less fortunate tenants on her husband's estate, whom she visited and to whom she provided assistance. She later became involved with other philanthropic projects and was particularly interested in those that affected mothers and children. She was also a social success with the royalty and nobility of Britain.

Given the ill-fitting match between the Duke and Duchess, it was only a matter of time before their marriage was in name only. A few years into their marriage, Consuelo reconnected with Winthrop Rutherfurd and went on to spend two weeks in Paris with him. Soon after, she confessed to her husband that she loved Rutherfurd and wished to elope with him (the Duke's second wife, Gladys, later implied that Consuelo's second son was Rutherfurd's). In 1900, with the Duke's reluctant permission, she went to London to discuss the elopement with Rutherfurd, only for him to refuse her. In despair, the Duke set off for South Africa, where his cousin, Winston Churchill, was serving in the Second Boer War. He was away for six months, returning in July 1900. Upon his return, Consuelo confessed to having started an affair with his cousin, Reginald Fellowes. She may also have had an affair with the artist Paul César Helleu, who portrayed her several times in his sketches and pastel artwork. The artist's daughter believed that Helleu and Consuelo probably had an affair between 1900 and 1901, which continued after his return to Paris, where she visited him and sat for him again. By this time the Duke and Duchess had completely stopped being intimate, and soon the Duke fell for Gladys Deacon, an eccentric American of little money but, like Consuelo, dazzling to look at and of considerable intellect. After Consuelo's affair and planned elopement with the married Charles Vane-Tempest-Stewart, Viscount Castlereagh (later 7th Marquess of Londonderry), the Marlboroughs separated in 1906 and divorced in 1921. The marriage was annulled, at the Duke's request and with Consuelo's assent, on 19 August 1926.

Although largely embarked upon as a way to facilitate the Anglican Duke's desire to convert to Roman Catholicism, the annulment, to the surprise of many, was also fully supported by Consuelo's mother, who testified that the Vanderbilt-Marlborough marriage had been an act of unmistakable coercion. Alva told an investigator: "I forced my daughter to marry the Duke. I have always had absolute power over my daughter." In later years, Consuelo and her mother enjoyed a closer, easier relationship.

== Marriage settlement and personal fortune ==
Consuelo Vanderbilt is one of the wealthiest and best-known "dollar princesses" of the late 19th and early 20th centuries, and the financial settlement at the center of her union with the 9th Duke of Marlborough continues to attract commentary and reference more than a century after the wedding took place.

During the period between her marriage to the Duke in 1895 and their divorce in 1921, Consuelo, her first husband and their two sons benefitted from circa $20,000,000 in gifts and inheritances from William K. Vanderbilt, including:

- The original 1895 marriage settlement:
  - A $2,500,000 trust with a guaranteed minimum annual income of $100,000 for the Duke
  - A $100,000 annual allowance for Consuelo during her father's lifetime, subject to a covenant that this amount would be guaranteed from a $2,500,000 payment from his estate after his death
- Approximately $2,500,000 spent from 1900 to 1904 on the land purchase, construction and furnishing of Sunderland House, a palatial London townhouse for the couple
- To Consuelo, a life interest in a $5,000,000 trust fund established in 1912, payable to her children after her death
- To Consuelo, an additional $450,000 trust fund established in 1917
- From William K. Vanderbilt's estate following his death in 1920:
  - To Consuelo, a 33.33% share of a $5,000,000 trust fund that her grandfather, William H. Vanderbilt, had established in his will for her father's benefit
  - To Consuelo's sons, Lord Blandford and Lord Ivor Spencer-Churchill, $1,000,000 each and a joint $900,000 trust fund

The Duke's trust

The Duke received 50,000 shares of Beech Creek Railroad stock, valued at $2,500,000, which was to be placed in trust, with a guaranteed income of at least 4% ($100,000 or £20,000) per year to be paid to the Duke for his lifetime, and then to Consuelo if she survived him. Following the deaths of both Consuelo and the Duke, the income from the trust would be paid to the next Duke of Marlborough, provided that he was a descendant of the couple. In the event of Consuelo and the Duke not being survived by a son or male-line descendant, the trust would vest in their other descendants, which the Duke had the power to appoint by deed or will.

A 1944 court ruling in the Chancery Division of the English High Court of Justice held that death duties on this trust had become payable by Consuelo's son, the 10th Duke of Marlborough, upon the death of the 9th Duke in 1934, despite the fact that the income was still being paid to Consuelo for the remainder of her lifetime. The duties, with interest added for the period between the 9th Duke's death and 12 April 1946 were paid in 1946, and amounted to approximately £175,000.

Consuelo's trust

Part of the marriage settlement took the form of a covenant made by William K. Vanderbilt to pay Consuelo $100,000 annually for their joint lifetimes; this provided for the payment of $2,500,000 within a year of his death to Consuelo's trustees, with the income to be derived by her for the remainder of her lifetime. If she predeceased the 9th Duke, the income was to be paid to him for his life, and following both of their deaths, the trust would vest in the couple's children, unless Consuelo made an alternative appointment in her will.

Following William K. Vanderbilt's death in 1920, the $2,500,000 was treated as a debt against his estate that was duly transferred to Consuelo's trustees.

Construction of Sunderland House

In the 1890s, the British elite's social and political life was set in an array of palatial London homes; these included Marlborough House (the Prince of Wales), Lansdowne House (the Marquess of Lansdowne), Devonshire House (the Duke of Devonshire), Montagu House (the Duke of Buccleuch), Apsley House (the Duke of Wellington), Grosvenor House (the Duke of Westminster), Hampden House (the Duke of Abercorn), and Holland House (the Earl of Ilchester; the ball held at this residence denoted the end of the London season).

Consuelo recorded in her memoir that, prior to her marriage, her first husband's family had no permanent London residence. A lease was taken in a small house on South Audley Street for the 1896 season (May to July). In 1897, they took a lease of Spencer House, where the first child of the marriage, John, was born on 18 September. Consuelo felt the house was a fitting place for the birth, noting that the Spencer-Churchills were descendants of the Spencer family. In 1899 the Marlboroughs leased Alington House, 8 South Audley Street, Mayfair.

Consuelo attributed the construction of Sunderland House to her husband choosing to embark on a political career (his appointment as Paymaster General in 1899 was succeeded by his elevation to Under-Secretary of State for the Colonies in 1903), reasoning that "With my husband embarked on a political career it seemed advisable to have a permanent establishment in London rather than to lease a different house every year. I only had to mention our wish for my father to promise its fulfilment."

Contemporary newspaper reports suggest that enquiries were made by Consuelo's father and husband as to whether the ancestral London townhouse of the Dukes of Marlborough, Marlborough House, could be recovered from the Crown Estate. Once it had become apparent that this could not be achieved, the Marlboroughs acquired a rare piece of London real estate for $380,000. The parts of London where "the best" people lived belonged to great landlords – the Duke of Westminster, Viscount Portman and Earl Cadogan — who maintained a policy to lease, rather than sell land; Consuelo noted that "to find a freehold, however small, was therefore an achievement". A further $500,000 was reportedly spent on the construction and more than $1,000,000 on fitting out and furnishing the new building. The total cost of the large greystone mansion was later reported as being in excess of $2,500,000. Consuelo credited the design to Achille Duchêne.

The question of the house's name was raised by the then-Prince of Wales at a dinner held at his London residence, Marlborough House; he also expressed his view that the site was ill-chosen owing to the proximity of a slum to Curzon Street. Consuelo ventured both "Blandford House" and "Sunderland House" for the building, with the latter ultimately being chosen (Marquess of Blandford and Earl of Sunderland are amongst the many subsidiary titles held by the Duke of Marlborough).

Father's estate and inheritance

In the months prior to and following the death of Consuelo's father in August 1920, it was rumoured that he had gifted her $15,000,000. The speculation was serious enough to result in a representative of the New York State Tax Office being quoted in The New York Times as stating that litigation could arise as to whether the gift would be subject to more than $500,000 in inheritance taxes.

In 1926, documents relating to negotiations between William K. Vanderbilt and the Duke prior to the marriage were found in the New York Surrogate's Court. These documents included a letter dated 15 December 1919; transcriptions of it published in 1926 note that Consuelo's father had settled significant additional funds and trusts on Consuelo and her children subsequent to her initial marriage settlement:

- A$5,000,000 trust fund consisting of New York Central and Hudson River Railroad Company 3.5% Lake Shore collateral trust bonds in 1912, which provided a life interest to Consuelo, and was thereafter payable to her sons
- $450,000 of 1917 3.5% liberty bonds, conveyed to Consuelo's brothers in 1919 with the express provision that they be held in trust for Consuelo

Besides the $2,500,000 that William K. Vanderbilt had pledged to transfer to Consuelo's trustees after his death and which formed part of her marriage settlement, his will provided for a further $2,500,000 to be placed in trust for Consuelo's benefit, with her brothers, William K. Vanderbilt Jr. and Harold S. Vanderbilt, as trustees. Following her death, the principal of this additional $2,500,000 trust was to be paid to her children.

Her two sons received $1,000,000 each and a joint $900,000 trust fund.

Furthermore, Consuelo benefited from $1,670,000 derived from a trust established by her grandfather, William H. Vanderbilt; following his death in 1885, each of his eight children received a $5,000,000 trust from his estate. The will of William K. Vanderbilt did not make any provisions as to the distribution of this trust, and as a result the principal vested in equal shares between Consuelo and her two brothers.

Consuelo also received a reversionary interest in her father's French properties at 10 & 11 Rue Leroux, Paris and a château in Normandy, in which her stepmother had a life interest.

Will and personal estate

Following Consuelo Vanderbilt-Balsan's death in 1964, her will was submitted to the Suffolk County Surrogate's Court in New York.

Newspaper reports of the filing and grant of probate noted that the trust which formed part of Consuelo's marriage settlement (originally worth $2,500,000) was to be split into 25 shares; the majority were bequeathed to her granddaughter, Lady Sarah Russell, who received 15 shares. The remaining shares were left to three other grandchildren – four shares each to Lord Charles Spencer-Churchill and Lady Caroline Waterhouse, and two shares to Lady Rosemary Muir. In January 1965, Lady Sarah made a public statement which denied an inheritance running into the millions, stating that her late grandmother "did not have millions", but conceding that she had inherited a property on Long Island worth $250,000.

Other bequests included an estate in Palm Beach to Lord Charles Spencer-Churchill, £10,700 and an Ingres painting to Lady Ivor Spencer-Churchill, £14,200 to her butler, Louis Hoffmann, and bequests to five other household staff members ranging from £1,070 to £5,350.

A provision in the will also noted that no bequest had been made to her son, the 10th Duke of Marlborough, due to the ample provision already made for him under trusts settled by Consuelo's father. A family spokesperson reportedly disclosed that the approximate value of Consuelo's personal estate was $1,000,000.

== Second marriage and later life ==
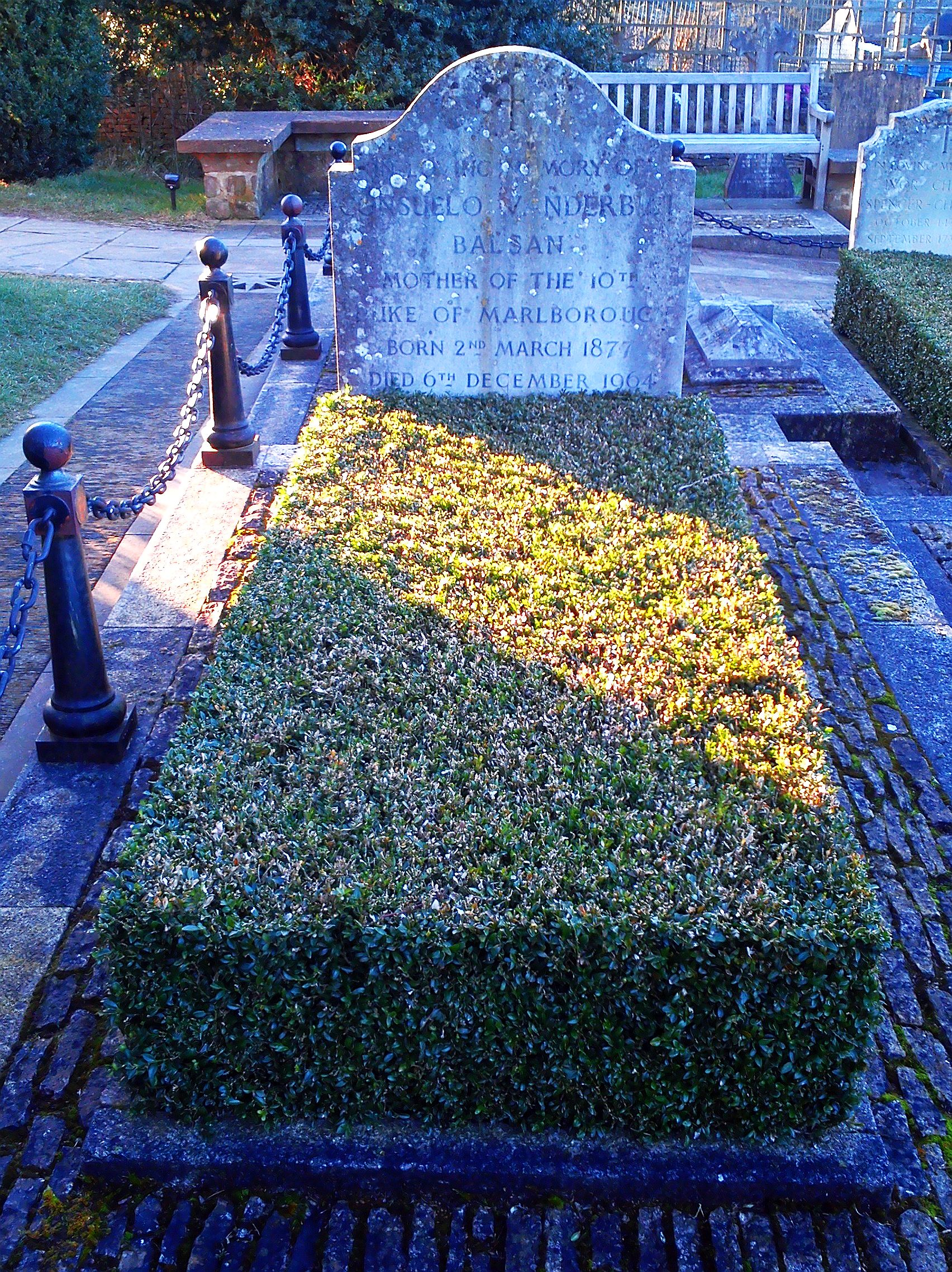
Consuelo's grave at St Martin's Church, Bladon, England

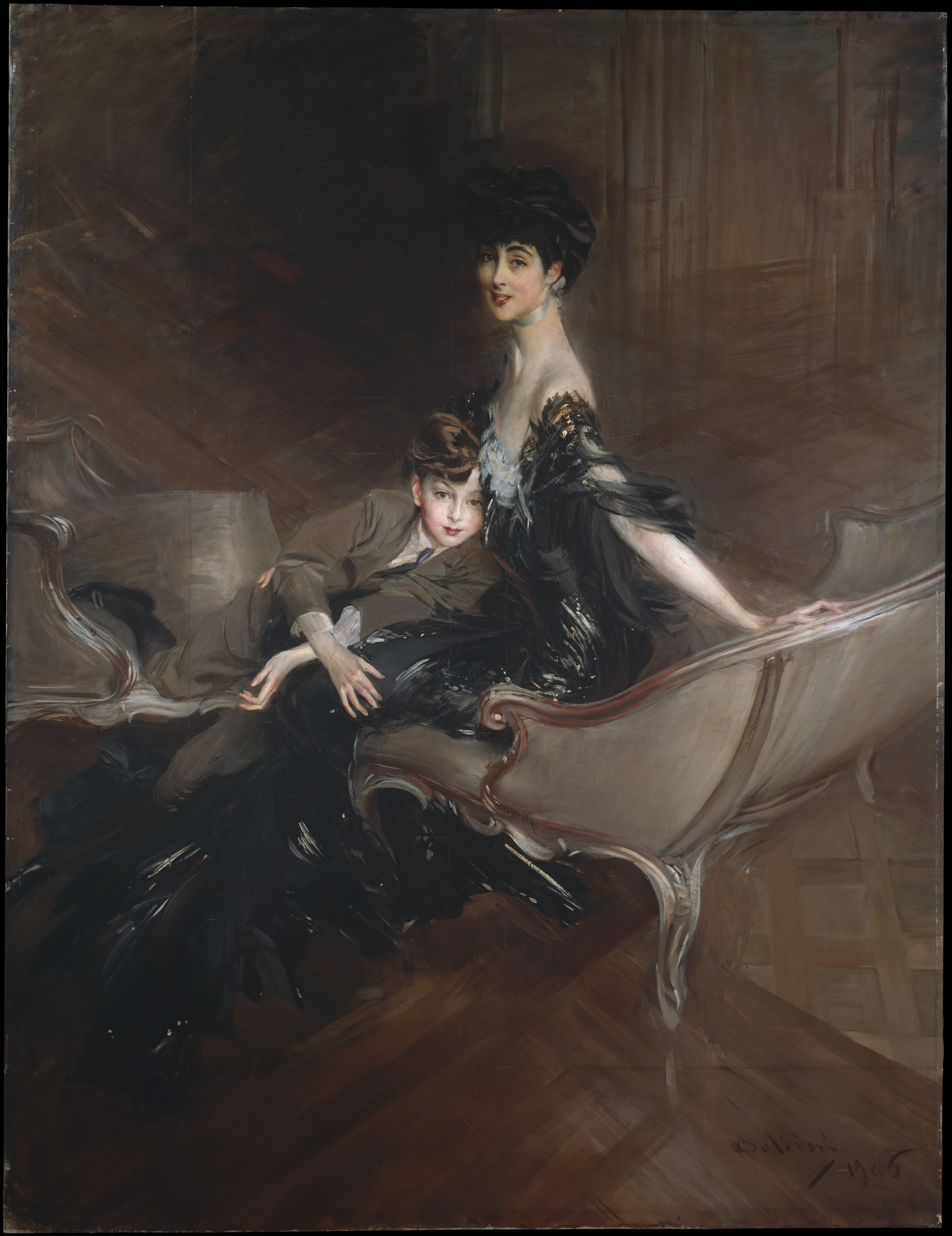
Consuelo and her younger son Lord Ivor. Ivor died in the 1950s, and Consuelo chose to be buried near him

Consuelo's second wedding, on 4 July 1921, was to Lt. Col. Jacques Balsan, a record-breaking pioneer French balloon, aircraft, and hydroplane pilot who once worked with the Wright Brothers. Also a textile manufacturing heir, Balsan was the older brother of Étienne Balsan, an early lover of Coco Chanel. Their marriage lasted until Balsan's death in 1956 at the age of 88.

After the end of her first marriage, Consuelo still maintained ties with favorite Churchill relatives, particularly Winston Churchill, himself the son of the American heiress Jennie Jerome. He was a frequent visitor at her château in Saint-Georges-Motel, a small commune near Dreux about 50 miles from Paris, in the 1920s and 1930s.

Records in Florida show that in 1932 Consuelo built a house in Manalapan, just south of Palm Beach. The 26,000 square feet mansion was designed by Maurice Fatio and named "Casa Alva" in honor of her mother; the property was sold in 1957. Many believe that, in 1946, Churchill polished his famous Iron Curtain speech here, as he visited Consuelo on his way to Missouri to deliver the address at Westminster College.

As Consuelo Vanderbilt-Balsan, she published her insightful but not entirely candid autobiography, The Glitter and the Gold, in 1953. In spite of suggestions that it was ghostwritten by Stuart Preston, an American writer who was an art critic for The New York Times, Preston consistently denied that role while admitting to unspecified involvement with the book. A reviewer in The Times called it "an ideal epitaph of the age of elegance".

After Jacques Balsan's death 1956, Consuelo continued to divide her time between New York City and Southampton, Long Island, becoming a familiar figure around town. The days of her notoriety were behind her but she had not lost her aristocratic tastes. Having once admired a Louis XVI room and its boiserie in a French chateau, she had the entire room transported to Gardenside, where it remained until her death in 1964. Consuelo died in Southampton, New York, on 6 December 1964. She was buried near her younger son, Lord Ivor, in the churchyard at St Martin's Church, Bladon, Oxfordshire, not far from her former home, Blenheim Palace.

The primary beneficiary of her personal estate, including her residence on Long Island and her jewels, was her eldest granddaughter, Lady Sarah Russell.

== Public service ==
Consuelo was considered to be politically liberal and quite progressive for an aristocrat, with her advocacy for social reforms and endorsement of the Liberal Party's welfare agenda, such as free school meals, free medical inspection for children, national insurance for workers and old-age pensions. She was also an advocate for women's suffrage, seeing it as a means to remedy social welfare problems – though she condemned militant tactics in stark contrast with her more radical mother. In 1913, she became chairwoman of the Women's Municipal Party to promote greater female participation in municipal elections.

During World War I, Consuelo worked as the chair of the Economic Relief Committee for the American Women's War Relief Fund.

In 1917, she became a councillor on the London County Council for Southwark West (later Southwark North) after a vacancy opened. Although she had no desire to enter politics, she felt a strong sense of obligation after the Women's Municipal Party asked her to take up the vacant seat. She stood as the candidate for the Progressive Party alongside Albert Wilson, winning re-election in 1919, and holding the seat until her divorce from the Duke.

During the interwar period, Consuelo and Winaretta de Polignac (Singer Sewing Machine heiress) worked together in the construction of a 360-bed hospital destined to provide medical care to middle class workers. The result of this effort is the Foch Hospital, located in Suresnes, a suburb of Paris. The hospital also includes a school of nursing and is one of the top ranked hospitals in France, especially for renal transplants. It has remained true to its origins and stayed a private not-for-profit institution that still serves the Paris community. It is managed by the Fondation Médicale Franco-Américaine du Mont-Valérien, commonly known as Foch Foundation.

== In popular culture ==
During the 2014–2015 exhibition at London's National Portrait Gallery, she was featured among the high-profile American heiresses to marry into British aristocracy. Also included in the exhibition were Margaret Leiter (married the 19th Earl of Suffolk), Jennie Jerome (married Lord Randolph Churchill), Mary Leiter (married the 1st Baron Curzon of Kedleston), May Cuyler (married Sir Philip Grey Egerton, 12th Bt), Consuelo Yznaga (married the 8th Duke of Manchester) and Cornelia Martin (married the 4th Earl of Craven).

== Gallery ==
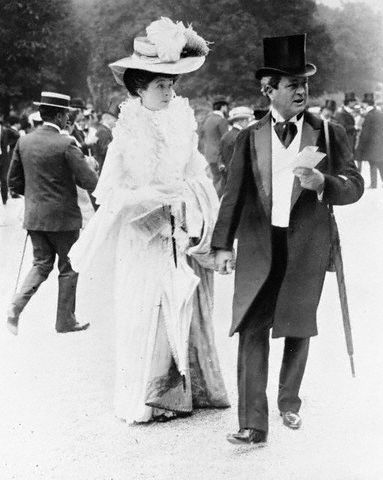
Consuelo with her father, William K. Vanderbilt

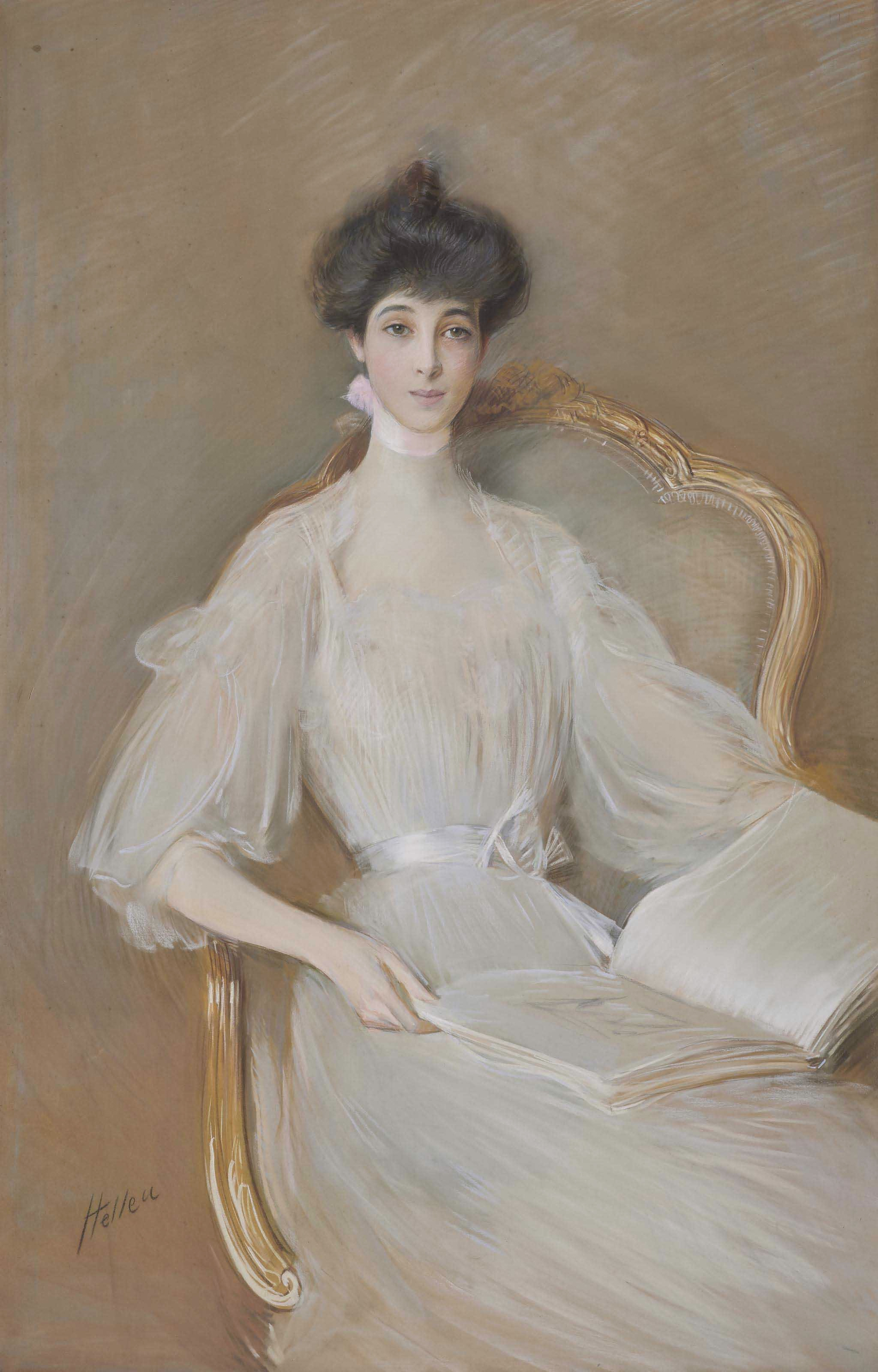
The Duchess of Marlborough, by Paul César Helleu

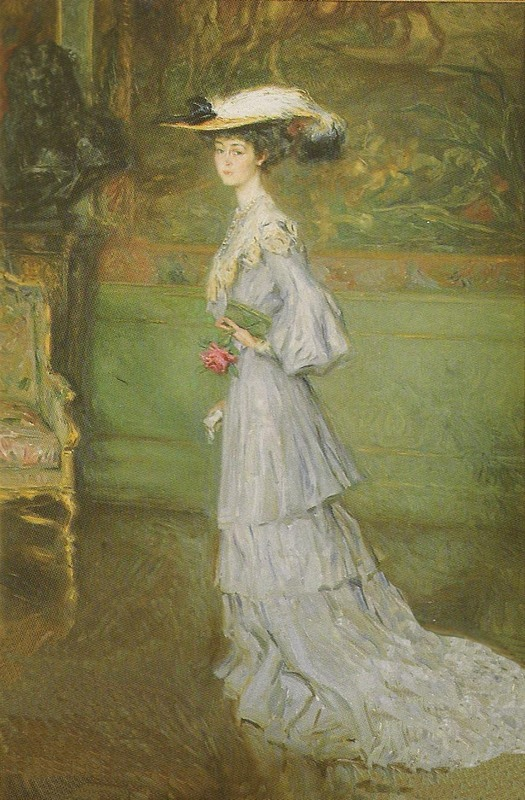
The Duchess of Marlborough, by Paul César Helleu
