= Château d'Augerville =

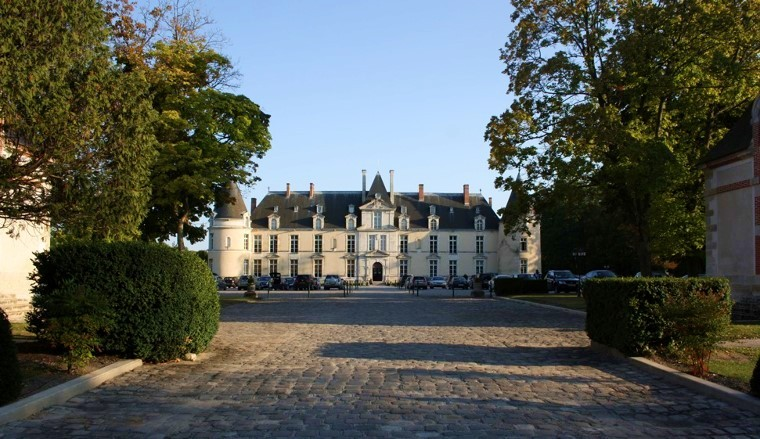
- The Château d'Augerville in 2010.
- Location: Augerville-la-Rivière, Loiret, France
- Coordinates: 48.25143°N 2.43871°E
- Built: 13th-17th century
- Architectural style(s): Gothic, French Renaissance

The Château d'Augerville is a historic château, situated in the commune of Augerville-la-Rivière, Loiret, France. It is a monument historique, a national heritage site of France.

== History ==
=== Early ===
The site is first mentioned during the twelfth century as Augerville, then a hamlet, in a charter from 1119. From 1207 onwards, Augerville was a stronghold for Philippe d'Augerville and his son Louis. There they built a château fort flanked by a pigeonnier. Louis d'Augerville died in 1248 without an heir, so the estate went to brothers Pierre and Dreux de Beaumont.

During the Hundred Years War, the son of Pierre de Beaumont, Jean de Beaumont, sided with the English. He was sentenced to death by the provost of Paris and was executed on September 6, 1367. His property was confiscated but later returned to his widow, Jeanne de Courtenay. She died without any children, so a nearby branch of the family took Augerville in 1403, in the person of another Jean de Beaumont. At his death, his brother Pierre de Beaumont inherited the castle but had to flee an English occupation. His lands were redistributed by the occupying English to French supporters of Henry VI of England.

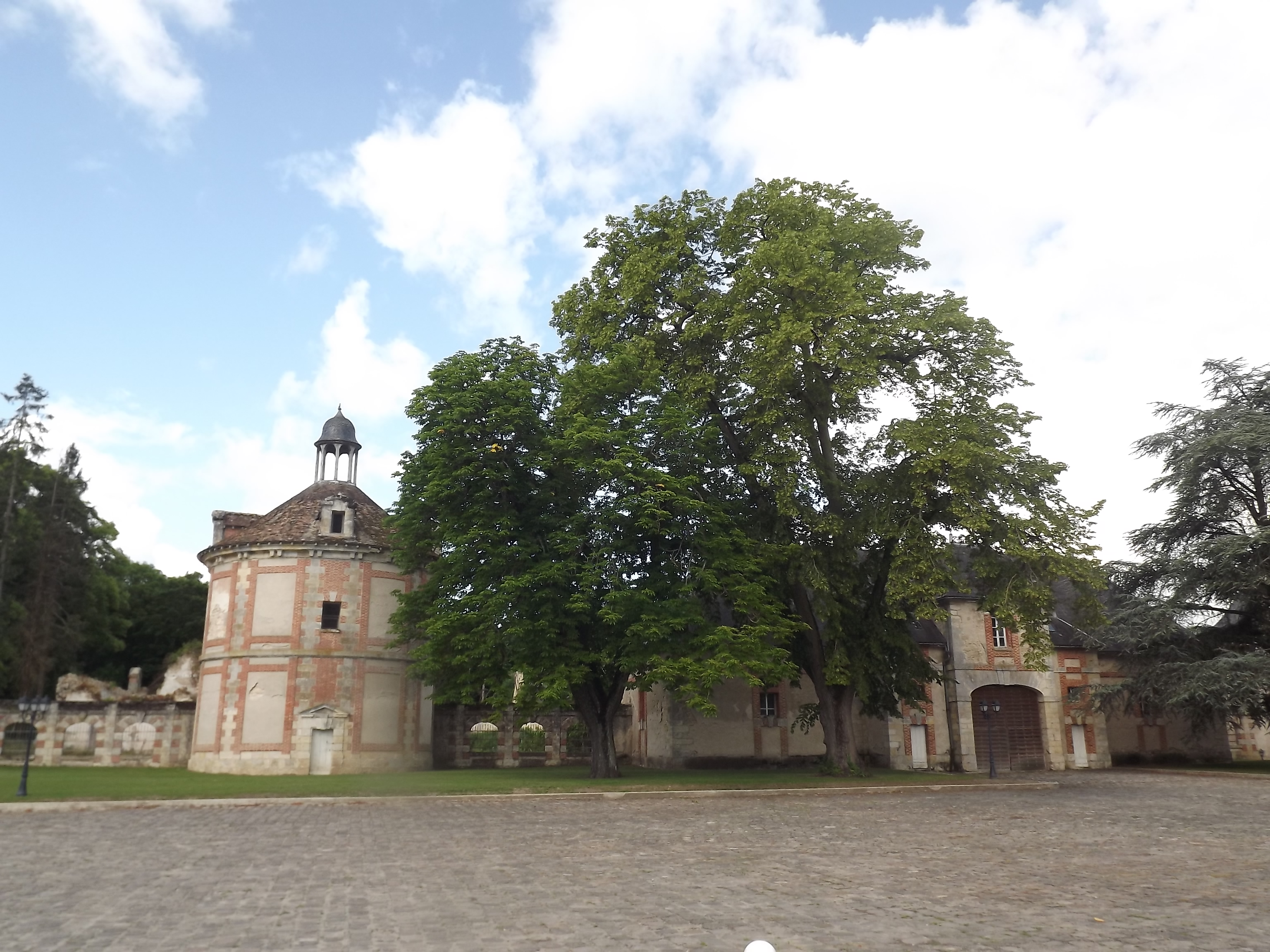
The pigeonnier and other buildings on the grounds.

The château fort was a ruin by the time it was purchased by Jacques Cœur, a merchant and major financier of King Charles VII, in 1452. Cœur had little time to enjoy the property, as he was put on trial for royal embezzlement and sentenced to exile, where he died in 1456. All of his property was confiscated by the crown.

Catherine de' Medici and her son, King Charles IX, stayed at the château in September 1562. An asset inventory of the fiefdom of Augerville-la-Rivière, dated June 30, 1582, noted that the château fort was surrounded by walls and a moat, fed by the Essonne River. It had a garden, a courtyard, a barn, a theatre, and a pigeonnier.

After another period of abandonment, the château was sold for taxes on October 22, 1637. It went through another owner, who began to restore it as a country house in 1644, but found it to be too large a task. It was bought in 1644 by Jean Perrault de Montevrault, who had the facades of the château and apartments restored and added two detached wings, a new pigeonnier, a new barn, and created a forecourt surrounded by estate buildings.

=== Later ===
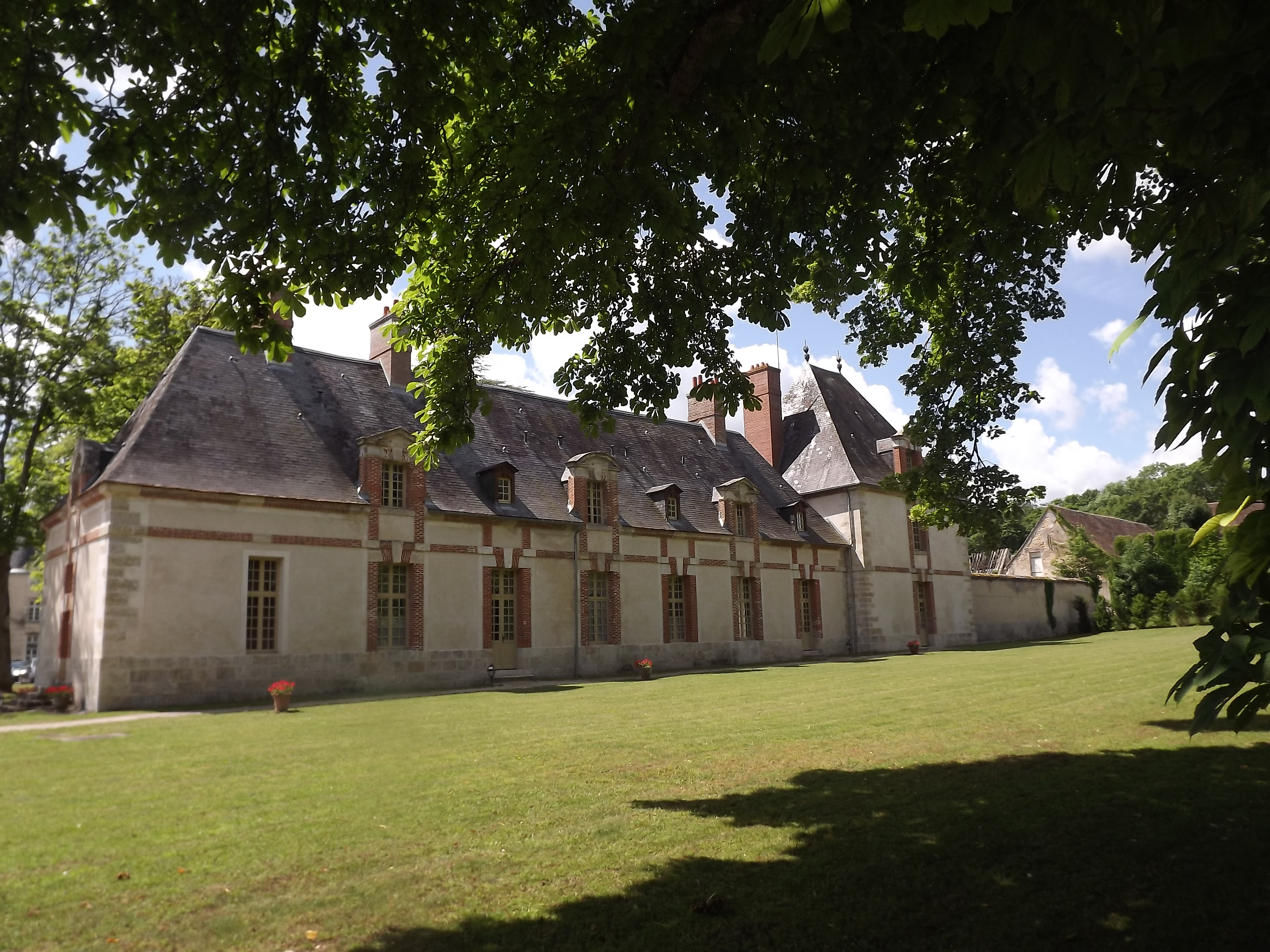
One of the forecourt buildings of the château.

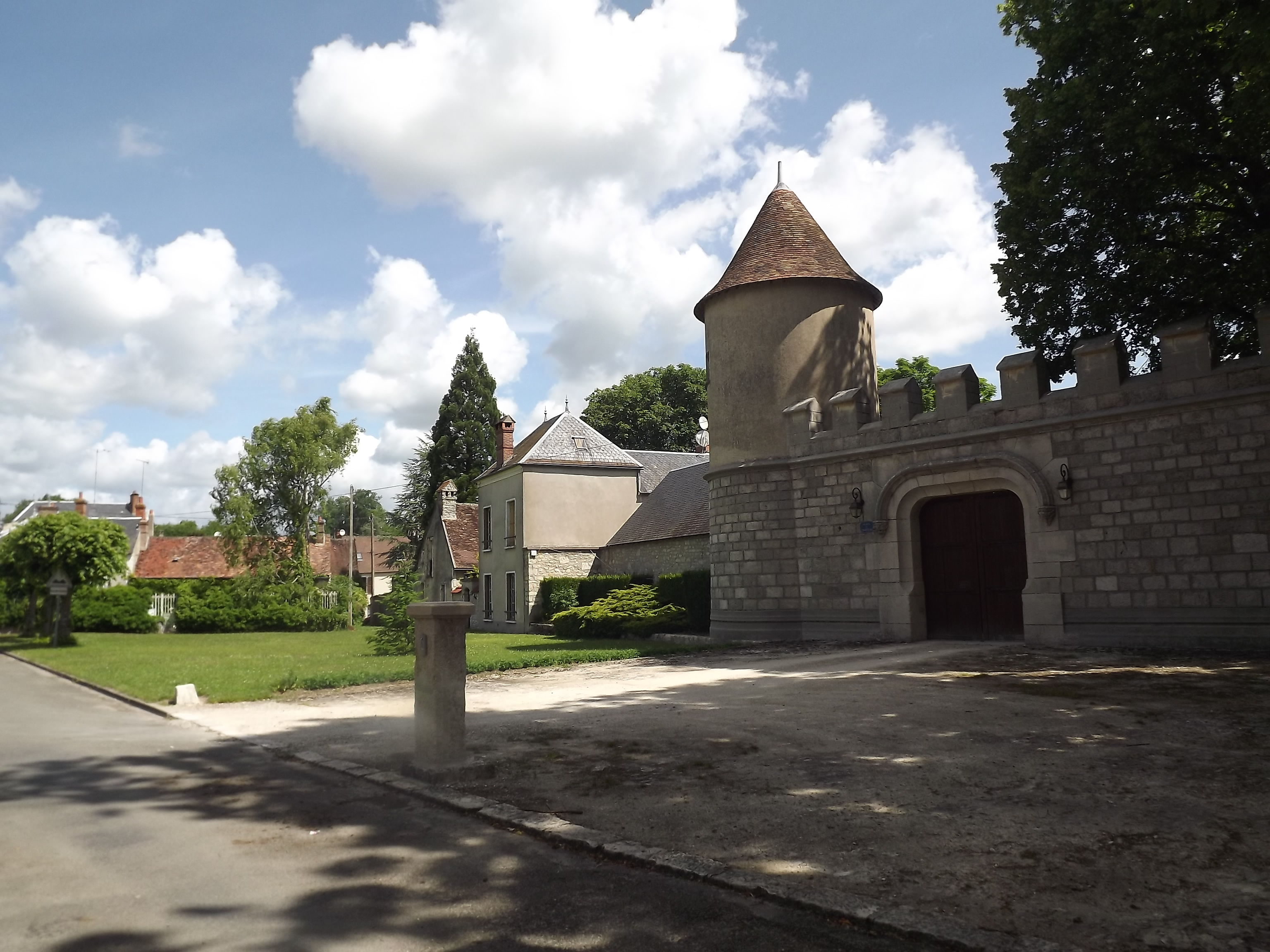
A side gate and the exterior wall.

The château was auctioned off in 1825. At that time it was described as being having forty-six rooms on three floors, with the south facade overlooking the park and including thirty-four windows and three doors. The northern facade at the time was noted to have thirty windows overlooking the main courtyard. The estate was purchased by Antoine Pierre Berryer, advocate and counselor to the French parliament. He spent much of his time restoring and expanding the property. His notable guests at the estate included François-René de Chateaubriand, Alexandre Dumas, fils, Franz Liszt, Gioachino Rossini, Alfred de Musset, and Eugène Delacroix. Following the death of Berryer in 1868, the estate went to his sister. She continued to make improvements. With her death, the property again passed to an absentee owner and was largely neglected. It was bought by Count de Pange in 1912. He restored facades, the gardens, and lands before reselling to industrialist Felix Mouton in 1919.

In the summer of 1926 the estate was purchased by American socialite Alva Belmont, formerly Mrs. William Kissam Vanderbilt, who restored it as her primary residence. It had been one of several inspirations for her châteauesque-style Petit Château in Manhattan. Her daughter, Consuelo Vanderbilt (who had married Charles Spencer-Churchill, 9th Duke of Marlborough), wrote that she thought that Jacques Cœur's reported ownership had partially inspired her mother to buy the estate. Belmont did much restoration and renovation during her ownership. She had the river flowing through the estate widened because she said, as Consuelo later wrote, "This river is not wide enough." She brought in paving stones from Versailles to cover the previously sand-paved great forecourt between the house and the village. She had a massive neo-Gothic portal gate erected on the northern entrance road, separating the château and village from the surrounding farmland. Changes inside the château included replacement of the wrought iron staircases and moving the kitchens to the basement. She also added a bowling alley in one of the buildings on the estate, one of the first in France. After her death in 1933, the chateau was left to Consuelo, who sold it to a Swiss company in the winter of 1937.

From 1986 to 1989, the château and 272-acre (110 ha) estate were resold twice. It is now a luxury hotel, complete with a golf course. The course, established in 1995, has 18 holes and was designed by Olivier Dongradi.
