= Augerville-la-Rivière =

- Commune
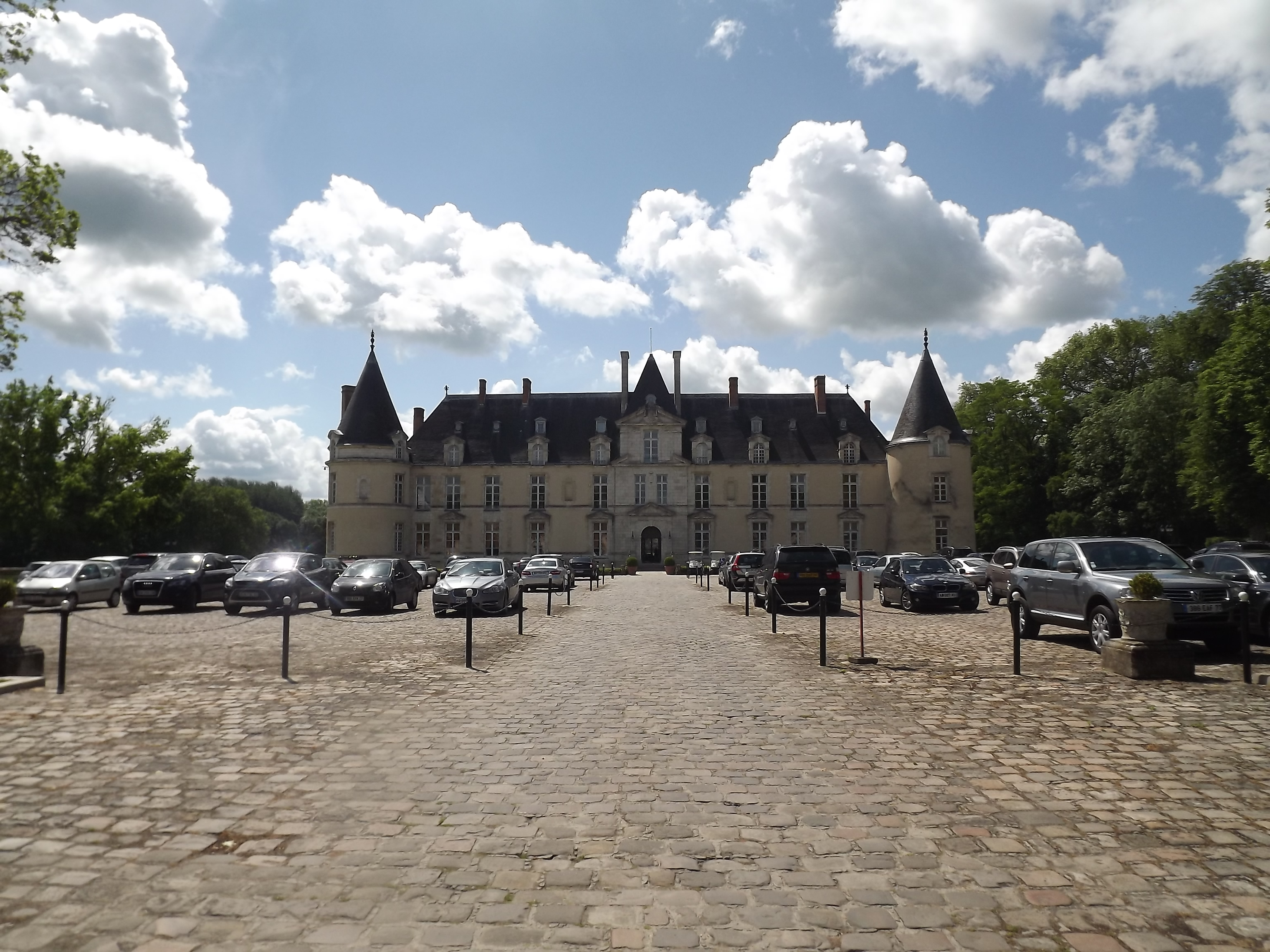
- Château d'Augerville, now a hotel

- Coat of arms
- Location of Augerville-la-Rivière
- Location within France Location within Centre-Val de Loire
- Coordinates: 48°15′10″N 2°26′14″E
- Country: France
- Region: Centre-Val de Loire
- Department: Loiret
- Arrondissement: Pithiviers
- Canton: Le Malesherbois
- Intercommunality: CC Pithiverais-Gâtinais

Government
  - Mayor (2020–2026): Olivier Citron
- Area^{1}: 4.03 km^{2} (1.56 sq mi)
- Highest elevation: 120 m (390 ft)
- Lowest elevation: 72 m (236 ft)
- Population (2023): 211
  - Density: 52.4/km^{2} (136/sq mi)
- Time zone: UTC+01:00 (CET)
  - Summer (DST): UTC+02:00 (CEST)
- INSEE/Postal code: 45013 /45330
- ^{1} French Land Register data, which excludes lakes, ponds, glaciers > 1 km^{2} (0.386 sq mi or 247 acres) and river estuaries.

Augerville-la-Rivière (French pronunciation: [oʒɛʁvil la ʁivjɛʁ]) is a commune in the Loiret department in north-central France. It is the site of the Château d'Augerville.

== Population ==
Historical population
Year	Pop.	±% p.a.
1968	165	—
1975	165	+0.00%
1982	164	−0.09%
1990	170	+0.45%
1999	197	+1.65%
2007	227	+1.79%
2012	232	+0.44%
2017	232	+0.00%
2023	211	−1.57%
Source: INSEE

== See also ==
- Communes of the Loiret department
