= Augerville, Illinois =

- Unincorporated community
- Location within Illinois Location within the United States
- Coordinates: 40°08′23″N 88°10′18″W
- Country: United States
- State: Illinois
- County: Champaign
- Elevation: 725 ft (221 m)
- Time zone: UTC-6 (Central (CST))
  - Summer (DST): UTC-5 (CDT)
- Area code: 217
- GNIS feature ID: 403725

Augerville was an unincorporated community in Champaign County, Illinois, United States. Augerville was northeast of Urbana and was near the city's border. By 2017, the community had disappeared.
