= Balsan (company) =

French textile flooring company

- Company type: Société par actions simplifiée
- Founded: 1755 (as Manufacture royale du Château du Parc crée) 2001 (as Balsan)
- Founder: Jean Vaillé
- Key people: Bernard Guiraud (President)
- Products: Carpets and carpet tiles
- Revenue: 61 million Euro (2018)
- Net income: 536,000 Euro (2018)
- Website: https://en.balsan.com/

Balsan is a French textile flooring (carpets and carpet tiles) company and market leader in its sector. With roots dating back to 1751 in Châteauroux, its origins are linked to the Royal Manufacture Château du Parc. The company is the fourth largest employer in the department of l’Indre.

== History ==
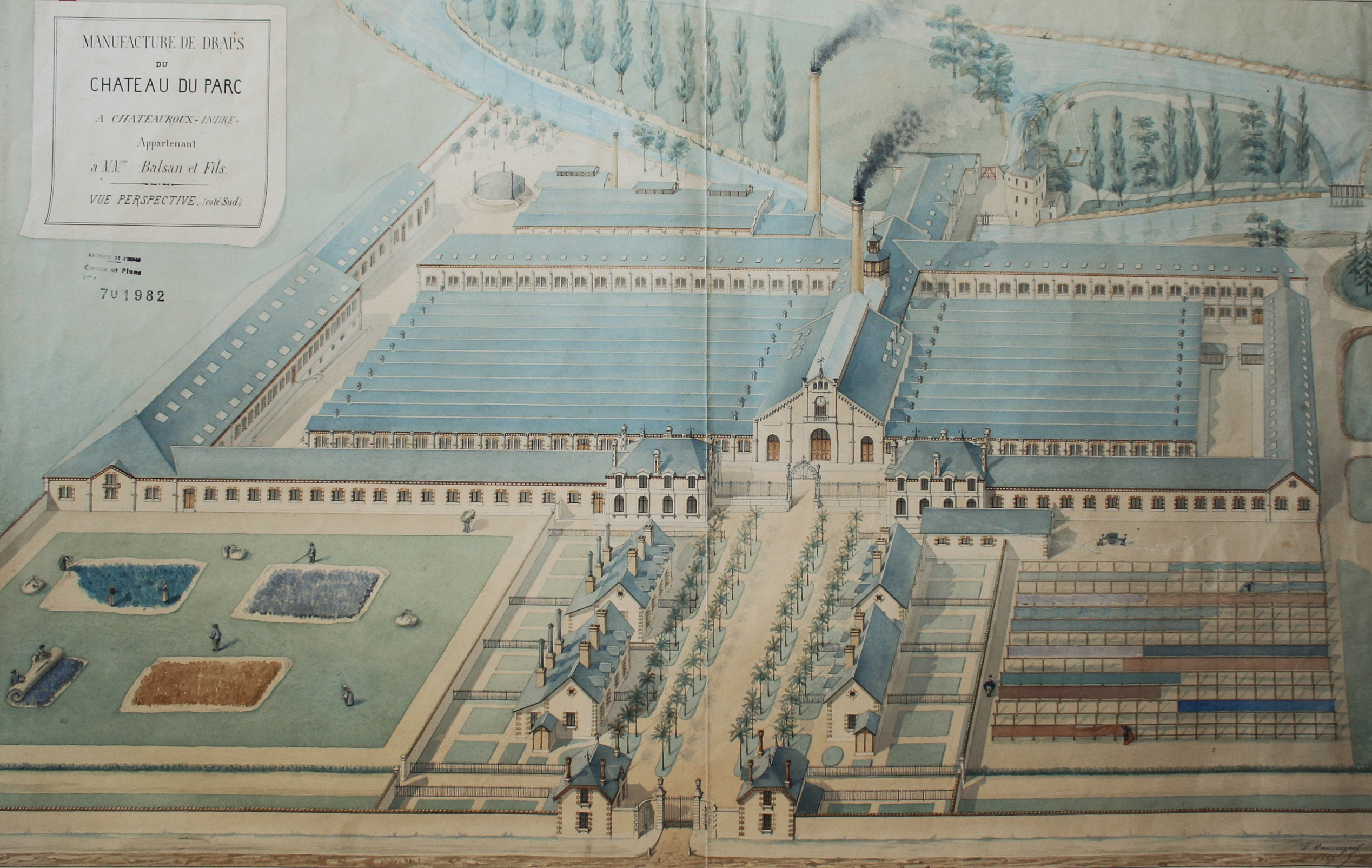
Plan of the historic Manufacture royale du Château du Parc crée

=== The royal manufacture ===
In 1751, Louis XV granted Jean Vaillé the right to create the Manufacture Royale du Château du Park, otherwise known as the royal factory of the Parc de Châteaux, close to the castle of Chateauroux, a pioneer town of the clothing industry. Construction commenced in 1752 and the enterprise became fully operational in 1755. Although it went through periods of prosperity following more difficult stages, the Manufacture laid a solid foundation for the regional economy as the leading business in Châteauroux and Bas-Berry. Consequently, it reinforced the long-standing local textile tradition that continues to this day. The organisation and factory have been the subject of numerous publications due to its management and the respect given to the lives of its workers.

=== Balsan ===
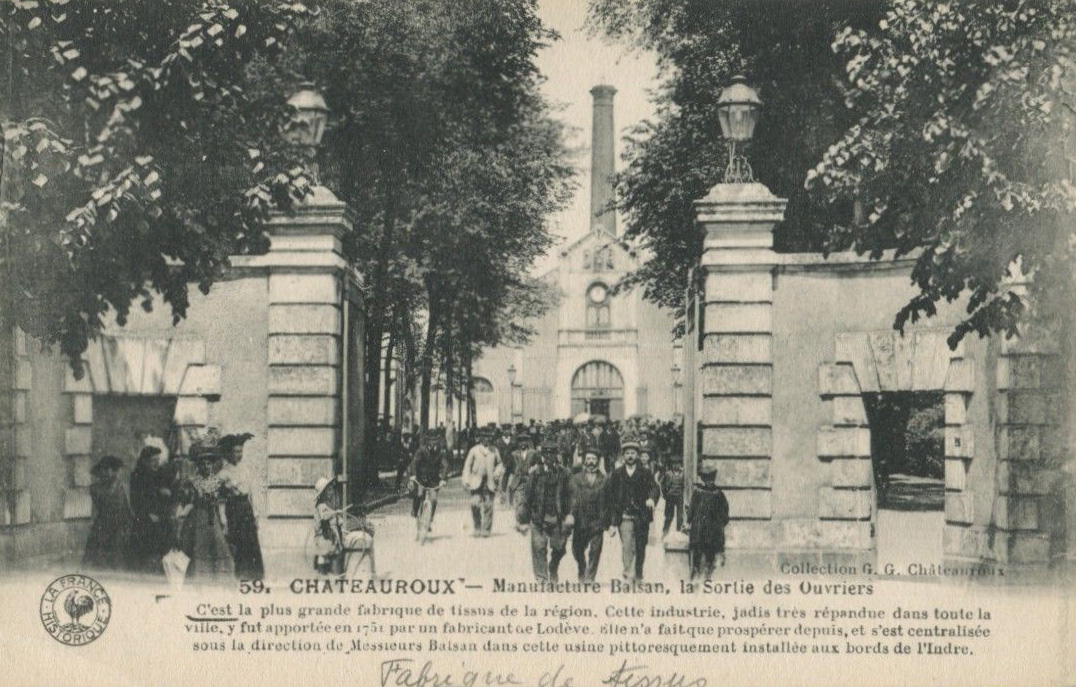
Manufacture Balsan in 1880 at Chateauroux

From 1856, the manufacture became associated with the name Balsan. Jean-Pierre Balsan bought it and gave it a second life. After he started working with his two sons Auguste and Charles, the company took the name of Balsan & Sons (fr: MM Balsan et fils). Between 1860 and 1869, a new factory was designed by the architect Henry Dauvergne. His project was both innovative and ambitious: in addition to the 60,000 m^{2} of workshops and warehouses it also included administrative buildings, a gas production plant, water towers, a worker township of 100 homes, a dispensary and a school. Its leaders, Augustus and Charles Balsan, led in parallel political careers; both elected representatives of the department of l’Indre. Charles advocated for a social and paternalistic capitalism. He worked on women's employment laws, mutual aid and industrial accidents.

In 1912, the company took out its final form as a Limited Liability Company with a share capital of 9 million French old Francs. It became la Société Anonyme des Établissements Balsan (en: the "Anonymous Society of Balsan Establishments"). The Châteauroux factories went on to mainly produce carded fabric intended for making uniforms for the Armed Forces, including the "blue horizon" worn by the soldiers of the First World War, and the various public administrations.

=== The 1955 reconversion ===
In 1954, Louis Balsan succeeded to his cousin François as the leader of the company. Having graduated from Sciences Po and Harvard, he was deported during the Second World War. He made contact with American factories specializing in tufting, a new textile production process used for creating carpets, bath mats, bedspreads. The company then diversified its activities by investing in dyeing machines and began manufacturing five-metre-wide tufted carpets using unique machines in France. The social development of the company continued with the introduction of paid internships and the construction of a day-nursery and a company restaurant.

In 1972, Louis Balsan decided to build a new plant in Corbilly (Arthon) following the innovative concept of the era of "plant in the countryside". After its opening on 22 June 1974, the factory experienced some difficulties which led Louis to sell Balsan to Bidermann Textile Group in May 1975.

=== 1975 to 2018 ===
Carpets production gradually moved from Châteauroux to the Arthon site. Towards the end of 1982, all production activities were moved to Arthon and the Châteauroux plant was abandoned. Purchased by the city in 1988, the historic site of the Avenue de la Manufacture (en: "Avenue of the Manufacture") became the district Balsan, an eco-district of the town. The site remained an integral element of the city and prominent site of community life.

In 1987, the clothing branch of Balsan was sold to Devaux, then to the company Oury in 1996, and finally to the Marck group in 2012. This branch specialised in the production of high-end uniforms, such as those seen in prestigious institutions such as École Polytechnique and the Saint-Cyr. The same year, the Belgian Louis Poortere Group acquired the Société Générale Textile Balsan (en: "General Textile Company Balsan"), doubling the size of the plant to span 45,000 m^{2}. However, in August 2000, Louis Poortere filed for bankruptcy.

In January 2001, Associated Weavers International, a Belgian manufacturer of tufted and woven carpets and rugs, took over the activities of Balsan. At that time, the company employed over 200 people on its Arthon and Neuvy sites, having acquired them in 1999, and was producing 10 million square meters of carpet per year, with 45% of production being exported to 75 countries.

In 2018, Balsan extended its range to include a vinyl flooring.

== Corporate affairs ==
=== Corporate governance ===
The Balsan company CEO is Bernard Guiraud.

=== Operating facilities ===
Balsan is located in the department of l’Indre in central France on two industrial sites:

- The plant in Arthon, specializes in the manufacture of broadloom carpet and produces around 45,000 m2 per week, with a workforce of 220 employed staff .
- The plant in Neuvy-Saint-Sépulchre, 10,000 m2, specializes in the manufacture of carpet tiles and produces 10,000m2 per week, with a workforce of an additional 20 people.

=== Environmental record ===
The company defines itself as a responsible company committed to sustainable development by focusing on 4 areas:

- The establishment of an environmental management system, whose objective is to get the NF EN ISO14001 certification
- Making efforts to reduce its consumption and limiting its impact on the environment,
- The integration of eco-design in its product development methods and processes,
- The development of a collection network and the recycling of carpet waste after use to involve all national players.

== Products ==
Balsan is owned by Belgotex International Group. It offers broadloom carpets and carpet tiles (more than 2000 item options of color and style: 70% of broadloom carpets, 30% of carpet tiles). The company markets its products through distribution partners or installation companies for offices, residencies and hotels. The Balsan company is focused on three market sectors: Office (22 collections), Home (24 collections) and Hotel (23 collections).
