= SS Ashkhabad =

Soviet merchant ship sunk during World War II

Coordinates: 34°21.908′N 76°21.081′W

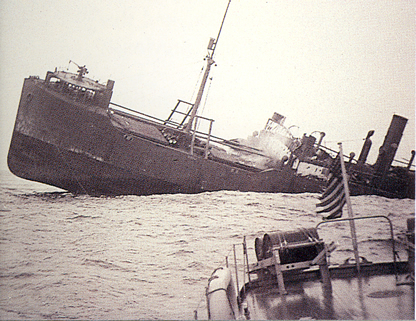
- Ashkhabad being shelled

History
- Name: SS War Hostage (1917–1919); SS Milazzo (1919–1924); SS Aldersgate (1924–1925); SS Mistley Hall (1925–1934); SS Kutais (1934–1935); SS Dneprostroi (1935–1938); SS Ashkhabad (1938–1942)
- Owner: Shipping Controller, London (1917–1919); Società Italiana di Navigazione Transoceanica, Naples (1919–1922); Navigazione Generale Italiana, Naples (1922–1924); City Gate Line, London (1924–1926); Charles G Dunn Shipping Co Ltd, Liverpool (1926–1934); Sovtorgflot, Moscow (1934–1942)
- Operator: Anglo-Saxon Petroleum, London (1917–1919); Black Sea Shipping Company, Odessa (1934–1940); Far East State Sea Shipping Company, Vladivostok (1940–1942)
- Builder: Harland & Wolff, Govan
- Yard number: 525
- Launched: 16 October 1917
- Completed: December 1917
- Fate: Sunk on 30 April 1942

General characteristics
- Tonnage: 5,181 gross register tons (GRT) (as built); 3,148 net register tons (NRT) (as built); 8,175 tons deadweight (DWT) (after 1919); 5,256 gross register tons (GRT) (after 1924); 5,288 gross register tons (GRT) (after 1925); 3,193 net register tons (NRT) (after 1925); 5,284 gross register tons (GRT) (after 1926); 3,164 net register tons (NRT) (after 1926)
- Length: 400.7 ft (122.1 m)
- Beam: 52.3 ft (15.9 m)
- Depth: 28.5 ft (8.7 m)
- Installed power: 489 nhp; 2500 ihp
- Propulsion: Triple expansion steam engine

SS Ashkhabad was a merchant ship of the Soviet Union sunk in 1942. She had been built as a British merchant ship in 1917 in Glasgow, Scotland as War Hostage. Over the next three decades she passed through a number of owners and had several different names; Milazzo (1919–1924), Aldersgate (1924–1925), Mistley Hall (1925–1934), Kutais (1934–1935), Dneprostroi (1935–1938) and finally Ashkhabad from 1938 to 1942. Originally designed as a freighter, she was at several points converted to a tanker to carry fuel oil. At the time of her loss the four hundred foot tanker was owned by the Soviet Union's Sovtorgflot organisation. She was torpedoed on 29 April 1942, and then sunk as a hazard to navigation on 3 May 1942. The wreck is now a popular dive site.

== Construction and early years ==
Ashkhabad was built by Harland & Wolff, Govan and launched on 16 October 1917 as War Hostage for the Shipping Controller, London. She was one of a large number of ships built to a standardised design, called Type 'A', to maintain shipping levels in the face of heavy losses in the First World War. She was altered while under construction to serve as a tanker, with the fitting of cylindrical tanks in her holds. The Shipping Controller assigned her management to Anglo-Saxon Petroleum, London, and she spent some time as a Royal Fleet Auxiliary ship. In 1919 she was sold to the Italian company Società Italiana di Navigazione Transoceanica, of Naples, who converted her to a dry cargo ship and renamed her Milazzo. She was transferred to the Navigazione Generale Italiana in 1922, and in 1924 was sold to the City Gate Line, who renamed her Aldersgate. She was renamed Mistley Hall in 1925, and in 1934 was sold to the Soviet company Sovtorgflot and renamed Kutais. Sovtorgflot assigned her management to the Black Sea Shipping Company, of Odessa, and she was renamed Dneprostroi in 1935 and then Ashkhabad in 1938. From 1940 she was managed by the Far-Eastern Shipping Company, Vladivostok.

== Loss ==
On 26 April 1942, Ashkhabad left New York City for Matanzas, Cuba, and was being escorted by the Royal Navy trawler Lady Elsa. At 9:50 pm on 29 April 1942, Lady Elsa spotted a U-boat five hundred yards off the tanker's starboard beam. Lady Elsa fired a round but the submarine had already launched its torpedo. Ashkhabad was hit on the starboard side by a single torpedo launched by the German submarine U-402. Ashkhabad's gun crew fired three quick rounds at the submarine when it partially surfaced, but scored no hits. Captain Alexy P. Yaskevich gave the order to abandon ship. Two life boats and one raft holding forty-seven crew members (three of whom were women) were rescued by Lady Elsa and taken to Morehead City, North Carolina. There were no injuries.

At 10:00 am the next day, crew from HMT Hertfordshire, a British trawler, boarded Ashkhabad and took valuable navigational equipment and clothing. The Soviets returned to their ship at 3:00PM and discovered it had been looted. The next day the Soviets returned to their ship in time to catch Hertfordshire's crew removing more loose items from the ship. Once they were told the ship was not abandoned and salvage tugs were on the way, the British returned the items they had taken.

Ashkhabad's condition appeared to be stable and she could have been salvaged and refloated. However, on 3 May 1942 the commander of the destroyer USS Semmes came across Ashkhabad and determined she was abandoned and a navigational hazard. Semmes fired three rounds into the ship, which caused the midship superstructure to catch fire. HMS St. Zeno saw the fire and also fired a shot at the tanker, under the authorization of the commanding officer of Hertfordshire, who commanded all British trawlers at Morehead City. His explanation was that he considered Ashkhabad a menace to a large convoy expected in the area, so he authorized the firing to sink Ashkhabad to extinguish the fire. By the time the Navy salvage tug, Relief, got to Ashkhabad, she was a total loss.

== Wreck ==
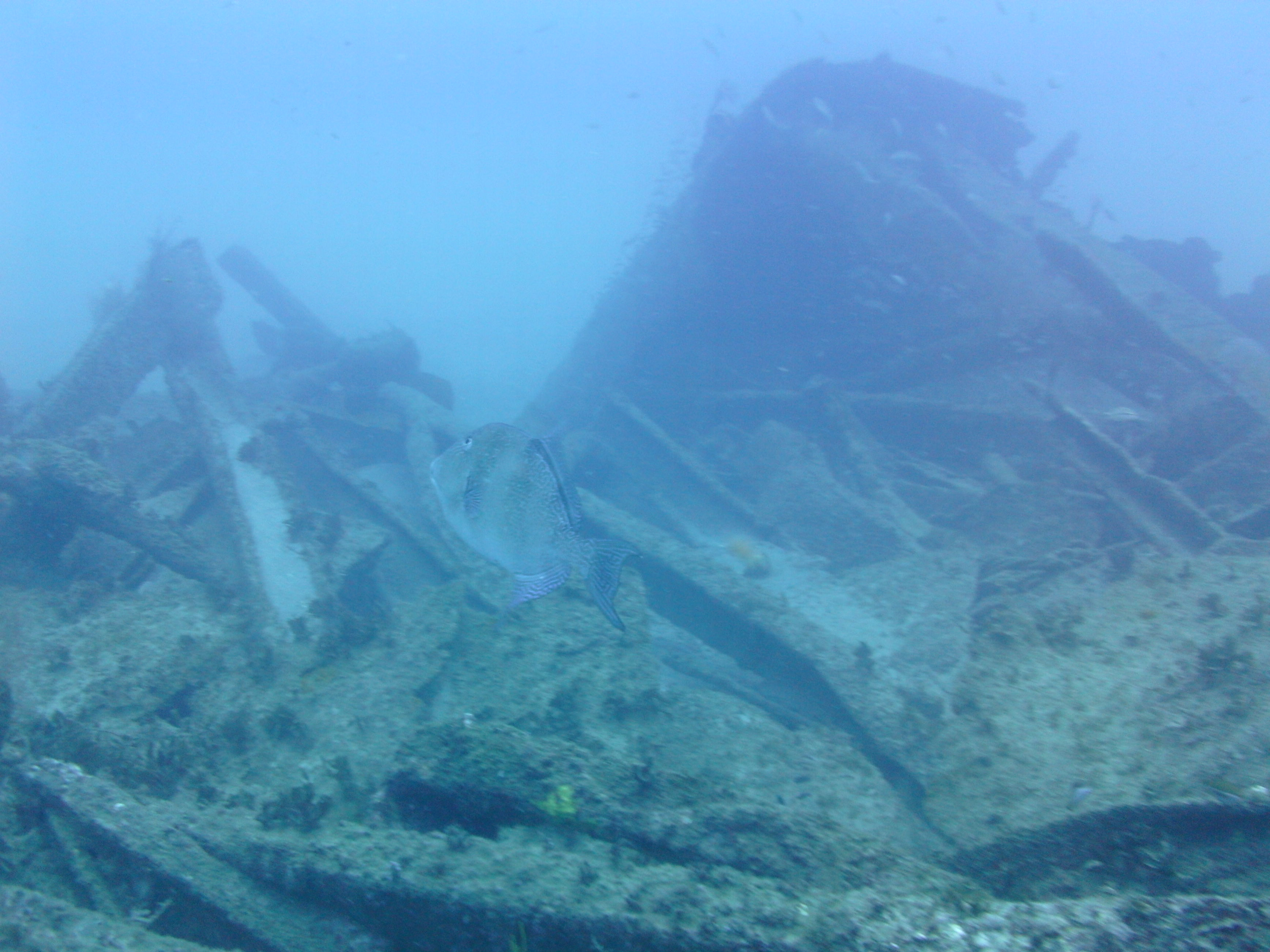
The wreck of Ashkhabad in August 2014

Ashkhabad has become a popular dive site. It lies at a depth of 55 feet off North Carolina, close to the shoals which are an hour boat ride from the Beaufort inlet. Because it was blown up twice, the ship is very broken up, but the boilers, condensor and some ribs of the ship can still be seen. Deck plates and twisted beams are scattered around the soft, sandy bottom.
