= Ferdinand Louis Reichmuth =

American Navy officer

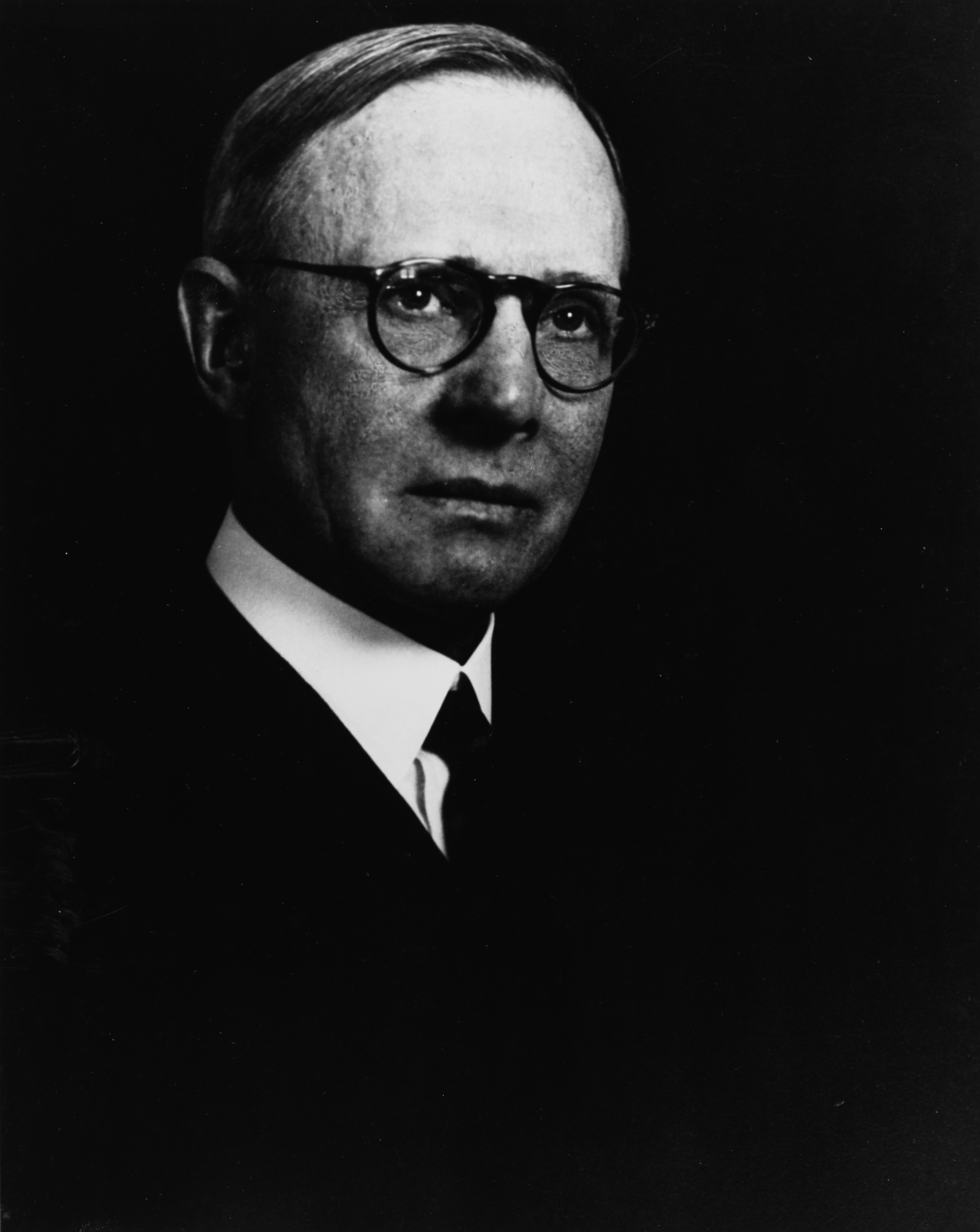
- Rear Admiral Ferdinand L. Reichmuth in 1944
- Born: April 11, 1881; Beloit, Kansas, U.S.
- Died: August 27, 1978 (aged 97); San Francisco, California, U.S.
- Military career
- Allegiance: United States of America
- Branch: United States Navy
- Service years: 1902–1946
- Rank: Vice admiral
- Commands: Cuyama (AO-3); Moody (DD-277); Chaumont (AP-5); Mississippi (BB-41)
- Conflicts: World War I World War II
- Awards: Legion of Merit

Vice Admiral Ferdinand Louis Reichmuth (April 11, 1884– August 16, 1978) was an officer of the United States Navy who served in World War I and World War II.

== Biography ==
Reichmuth was born in Beloit, Kansas, the son of Edward F. Reichmuth and Caroline Magdelena Krause, and the grandson of Ferdinand G. C. Reichmuth and Johana Christiane "Clotilde" Graff, a German immigrant from Colleda, Thüringen. He attended Ripon College, Ripon, Wisconsin, before his appointment to the United States Naval Academy from the state of Wisconsin in 1902. While a midshipman he was a member of the rowing crew. He graduated in February 1906.

=== Early career ===
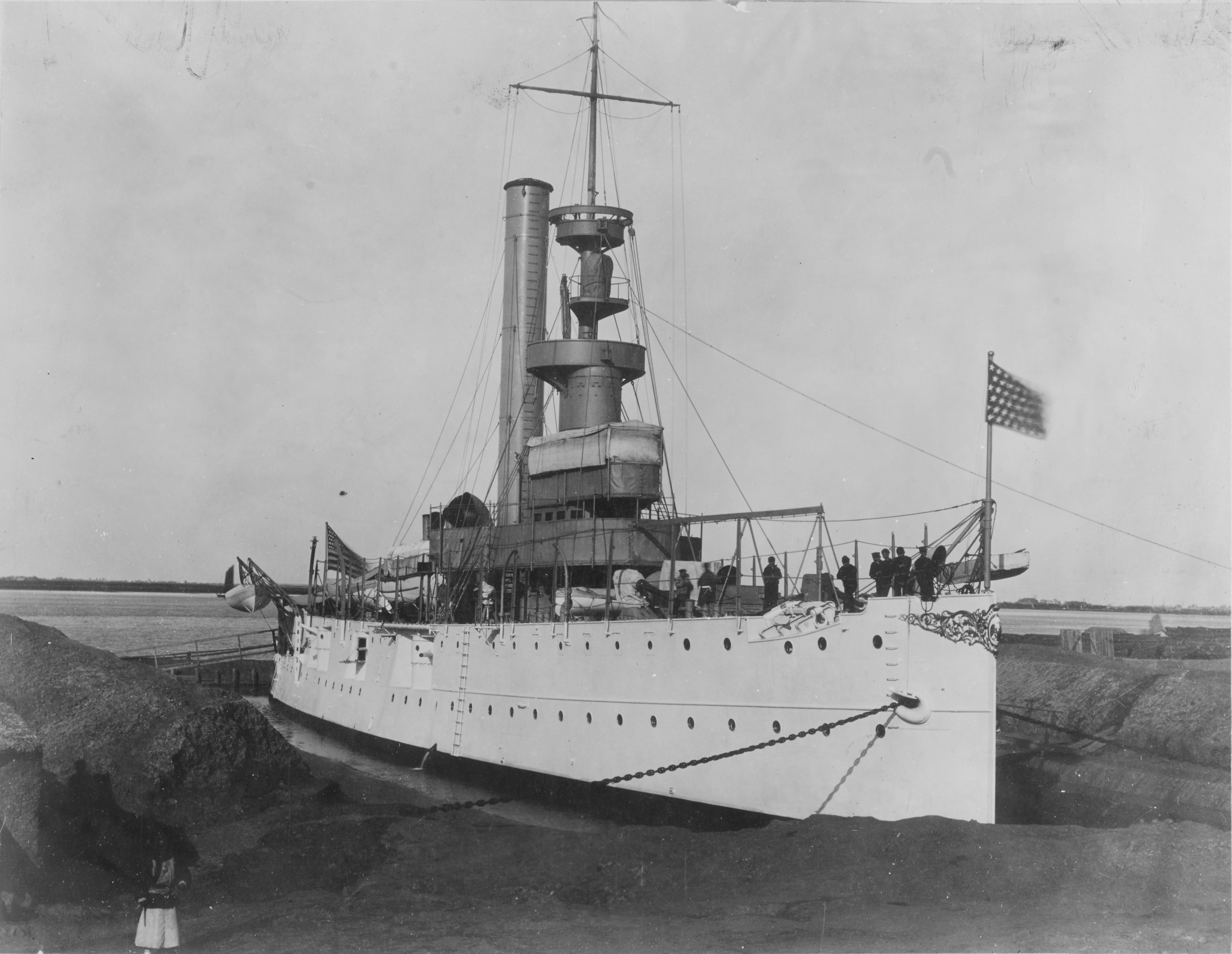
USS Helena

After graduation, Reichmuth was ordered to Asiatic Station, and served consecutively in the battleship Ohio (BB-12) and the gunboat Helena (PG-9) until May 1908. After serving the two years at sea then required by law he was commissioned as ensign in February 1908. Following brief duty on the store ship Supply, with additional duty at the Naval Station, Guam, he was assigned permanent duty at that station in June 1908, and in September of that year became aide to the governor of Guam. Detached from that assignment in January 1909, he rejoined the Supply, and in May of the same year was transferred to the armored cruiser West Virginia (ACR-5), receiving promotion to lieutenant (j.g.) on February 13, and to lieutenant on October 11, 1911. He left the West Virginia in June 1912, spending the next two years in the Inspection Department of the Navy Yard at Mare Island, California.

=== World War I ===
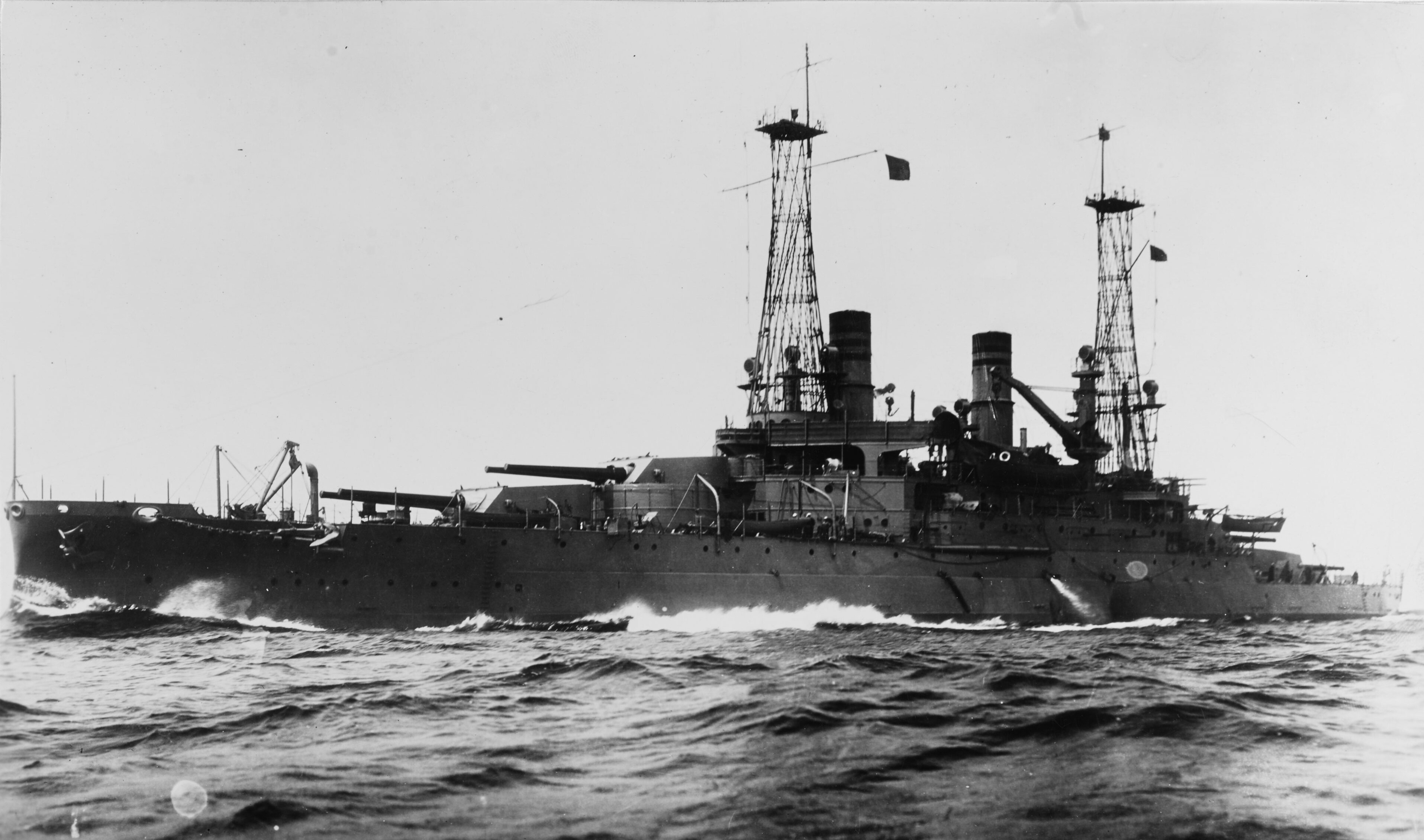
USS Michigan

In July 1914 Reichmuth joined the battleship Michigan (BB-27) and was serving as gunnery officer when the United States entered World War I in April 1917. Transferred to the battleship Oklahoma (BB-37) in September 1917, he served as gunnery officer, as she operated with the Atlantic Fleet. Detached from the Oklahoma in March 1918, he had duty in the Bureau of Ordnance, Navy Department, Washington, D.C., throughout the war and until December 1920, when he joined the Arkansas (BB-33) for service as navigator until detached in July 1921.

=== Inter-war career ===
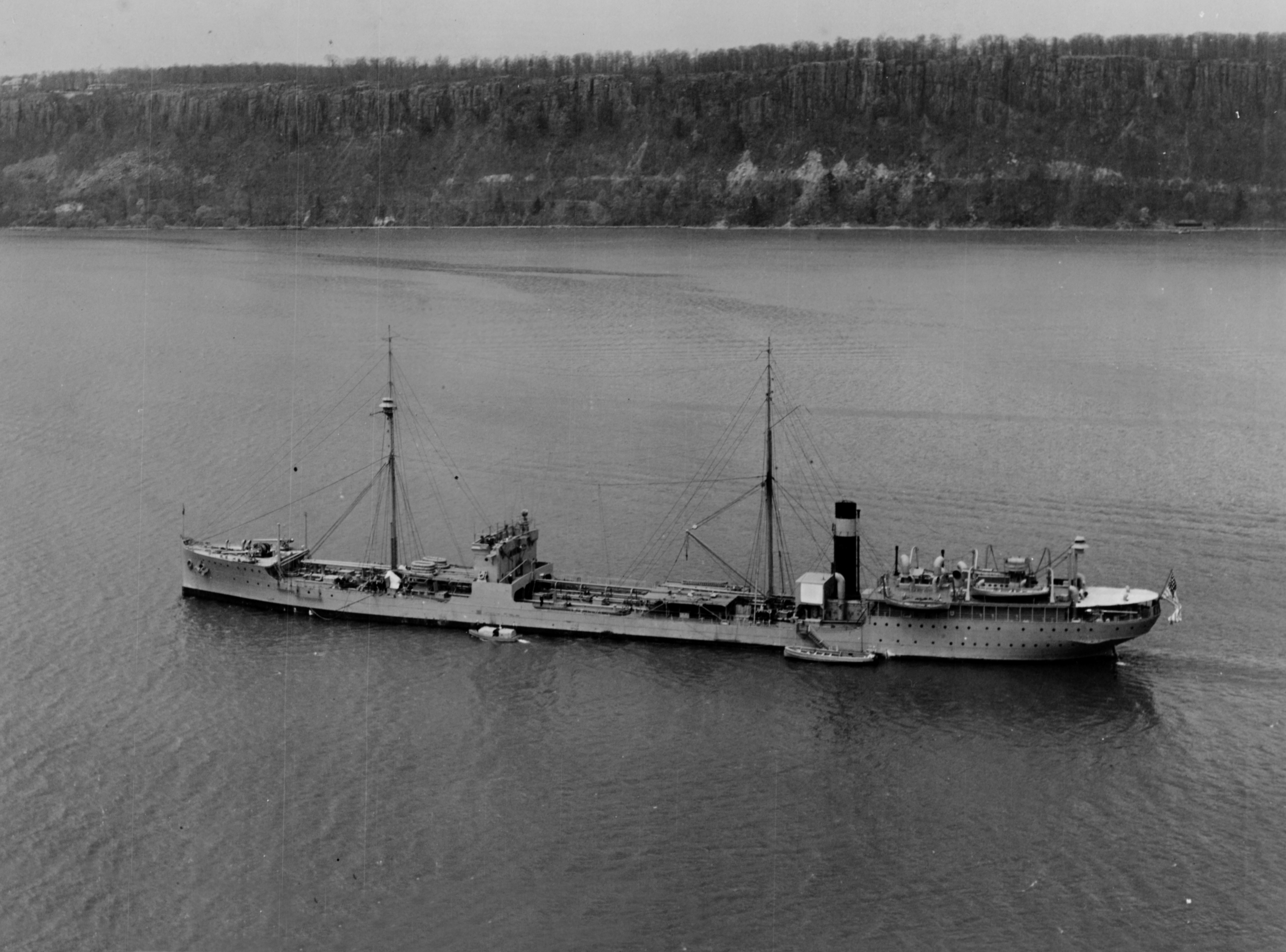
USS Cuyama, Reichmuth's first command

Reichmuth next reported for duty as force gunnery officer and aide on the staff of Vice Admiral William R. Shoemaker, USN, Commander, Battleship Force, Pacific Fleet, serving aboard the flagship Pennsylvania (BB-38). He continued in similar duty on the staff of Vice Admiral Shoemaker when he transferred his flag to the New Mexico (BB-40) as Commander, Battleship Squadron 4, Pacific Fleet, in October 1921, redesignated Battleship Divisions, Battle Fleet in December 1922. Reichmuth was promoted to commander on December 20, 1921. He was detached from his assignment in June 1923, to serve as inspector of ordnance in charge at the Naval Ammunition Depot, Mare Island, California, for the next two years.

In July 1925, Reichmuth reported for instruction at the Naval War College, Newport, Rhode Island, and after completing the senior course in June 1926 he returned to sea in command of the oiler Cuyama (AO-3). In May 1927 he was transferred to command of Division 30, Destroyer Squadrons, Battle Fleet, with additional duty in command of the destroyer Moody (DD-277), serving in those commands until June 1928. He then had duty as aide to the commandant, Twelfth Naval District, San Francisco, California, in connection with the Naval Reserve Affairs, until May 1931.

Having been promoted to the rank of captain on October 1, 1930, he assumed command of the transport Chaumont (AP-5), remaining there until April 1933. From May of that year until March 1936 he served as recruiting inspector, Western Division, San Francisco, California.

In March 1936, Reichmuth reported for duty as chief of staff and aide on the staff of Vice Admiral Clarence S. Kempff, USN, Commander Battleships, Battle Force, on his flagship West Virginia, continuing in that duty when Admiral Edward C. Kalbfus, USN, hoisted his flag in the West Virginia in January 1937, relieving Rear Admiral Kempff as Commander, Battleships, Battle Force, U.S. Fleet. Detached from that assignment in May 1937, Reichmuth commanded the Mississippi (BB-41) from June 1937 until April 1938. In May of that year he reported for duty as captain of the Yard, Washington, D.C., and in July 1938 was assigned additional duty as assistant superintendent of the Naval Gun Factory at the Navy Yard, serving in that assignment until June 1940, achieving flag rank as rear admiral on May 1, 1940.

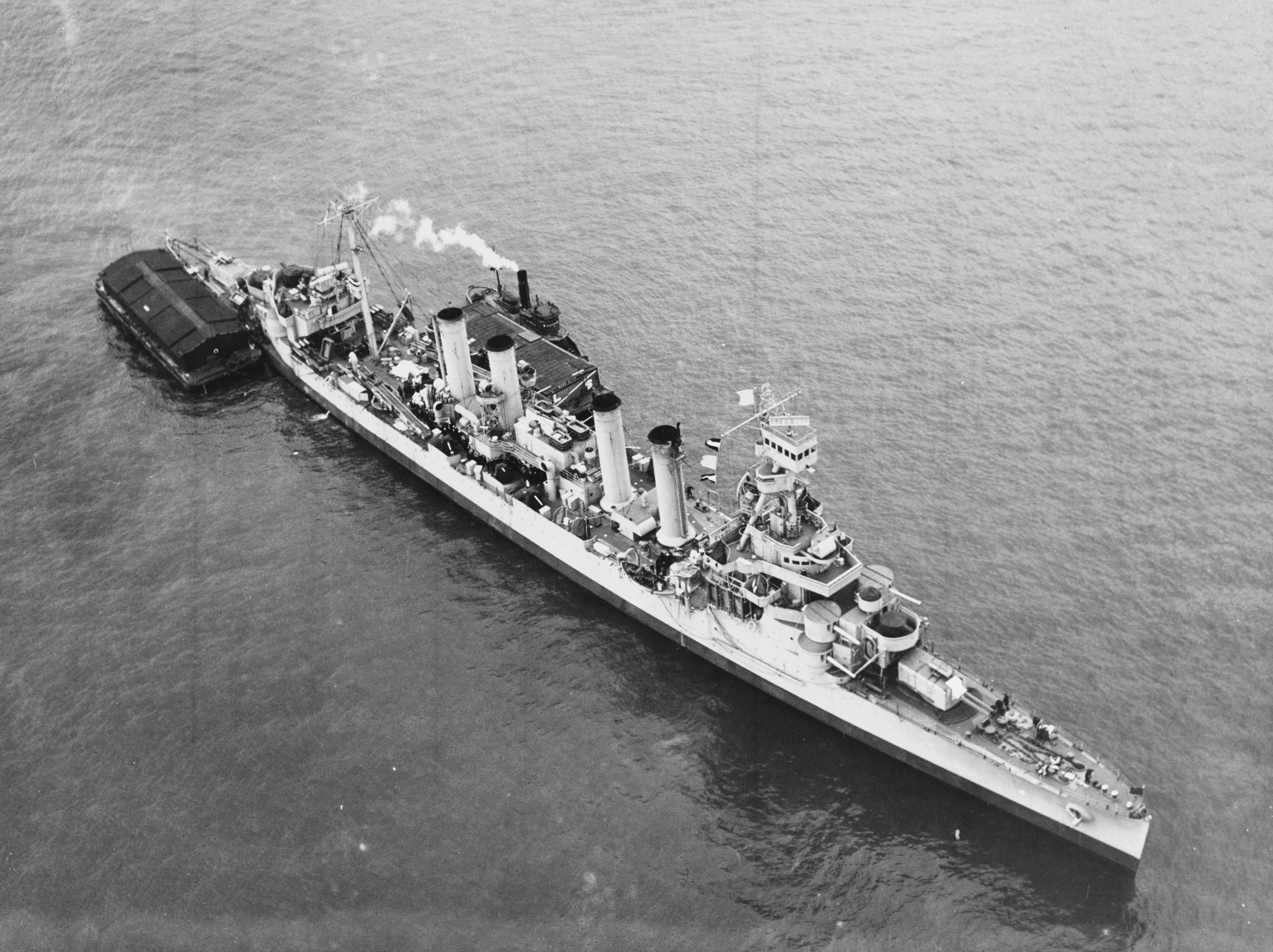
USS Omaha, Vice Admiral Reichmuth's final command

On June 20, 1940, Reichmuth assumed duty as Commander, Destroyers, Atlantic Squadron, with the destroyer Russell (DD-414) as his flagship. In November of that year he was transferred to duty as Commander, Destroyers, Patrol Force, with the cruiser Omaha (CL-4) as flagship, with additional duty later in command of Destroyer Flotillas Nine and Eight. In February 1941 he continued in command when his group was redesignated, Destroyers, Atlantic Fleet and in July of that year was assigned additional duty as Commander, Destroyer Flotillas, 3, 4 and. 8.

=== World War II ===
On December 31, 1941, he was detached from those commands and designated Commander, Train, Atlantic Fleet, redesignated in February 1942 Commander, Service Force, Atlantic Fleet, with the temporary rank of vice admiral. Upon detachment from that command on August 22, 1942, he reverted to his permanent rank of rear admiral.

On September 15, 1942, Reichmuth assumed duty as commandant of the Washington Navy Yard and the Potomac River Naval Command. In November 1945, in accordance with General Order No. 227, abolishing the U.S. Navy Yard, Washington, D.C., he was designated superintendent, U.S. Naval Gun Factory, Washington, D.C., with additional duty as commandant, Potomac River Naval Command.

=== End of career ===
On January 28, 1946, Reichmuth was relieved as superintendent of the Naval Gun Factory, but continued his duty as commandant, Potomac River Naval Command. He was ordered released from active duty on March 25, 1946, and placed on the Retired List of the Navy, as rear admiral. He was promoted to vice admiral on the Retired List, effective May 28, 1948.

Vice Admiral Reichmuth died in August 1978 in San Francisco, California.

== Awards ==
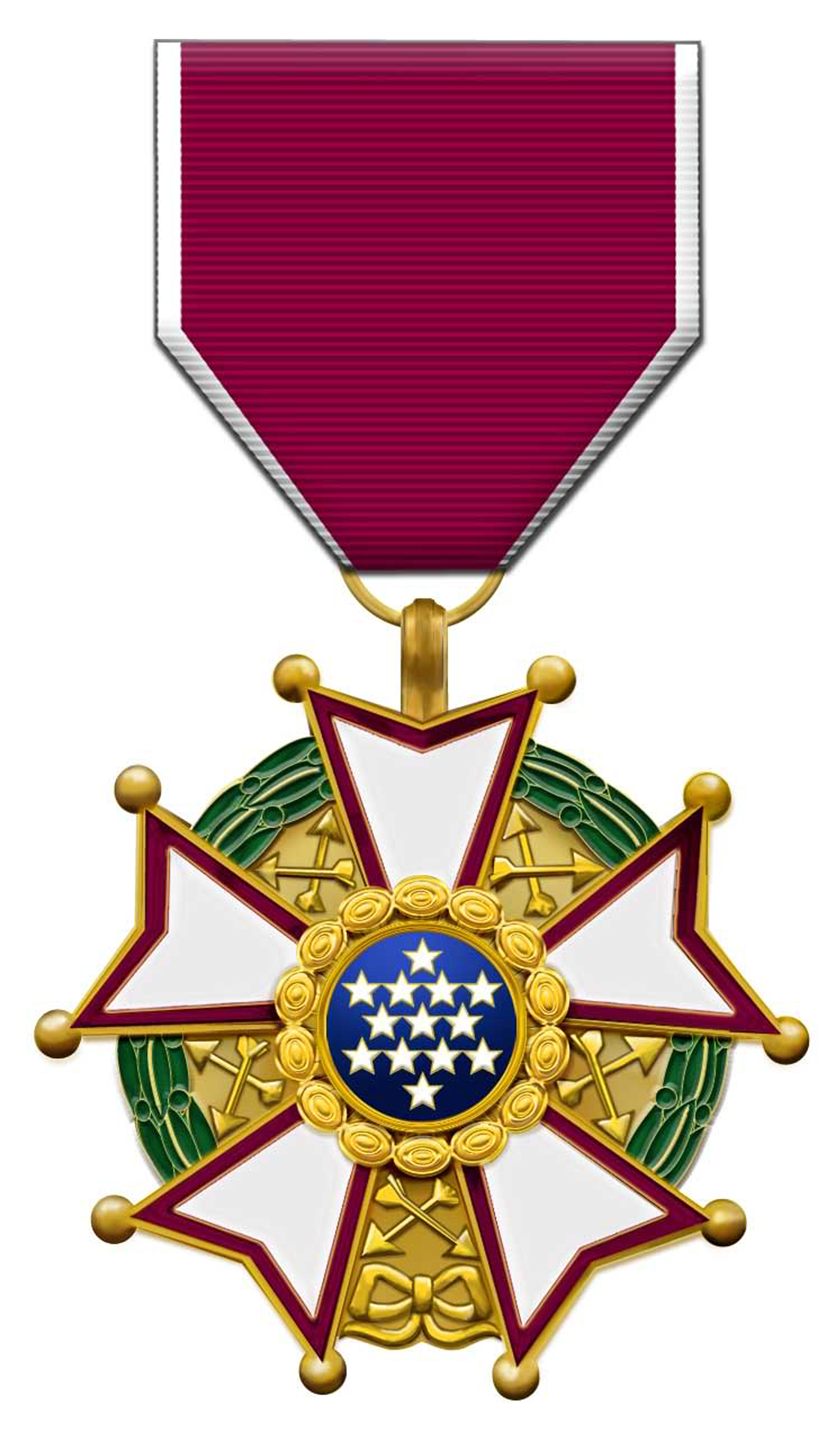
Legion of Merit Medal

- Legion of Merit

Citation: "For exceptionally meritorious conduct in the performance of outstanding services to the Government of the United States as Commandant, Navy Yard, Washington, D.C., Commandant, Potomac River Naval Command, and Superintendent, United States Naval Gun Factory, 15 September 1942 to 10 April 1946. Displaying foresight and initiative. Rear Admiral Reichmuth organized and administered the large number of Naval Personnel assigned to the Washing-ten Area. As Superintendent of the Naval Gun Factory, he was Instrumental in enlarging the production of his factory, and in training numerous personnel to guide the successful production elsewhere, In addition, he super-vised the design, development and construction of new arid improved guns and mounts, thereby contributing to the creation of a Navy second to none. His sound judgment high professional attainments and unwavering demotion to duty reflect the highest credit upon Rear Admiral Reichmuth and the United States Naval Service."

- World War II Victory Medal
- American Defense Service Medal, Fleet Clasp
- American Campaign Medal
- World War II Victory Medal
