= HMS Warrior (1917) =

Steam yacht and Royal Navy armed yacht

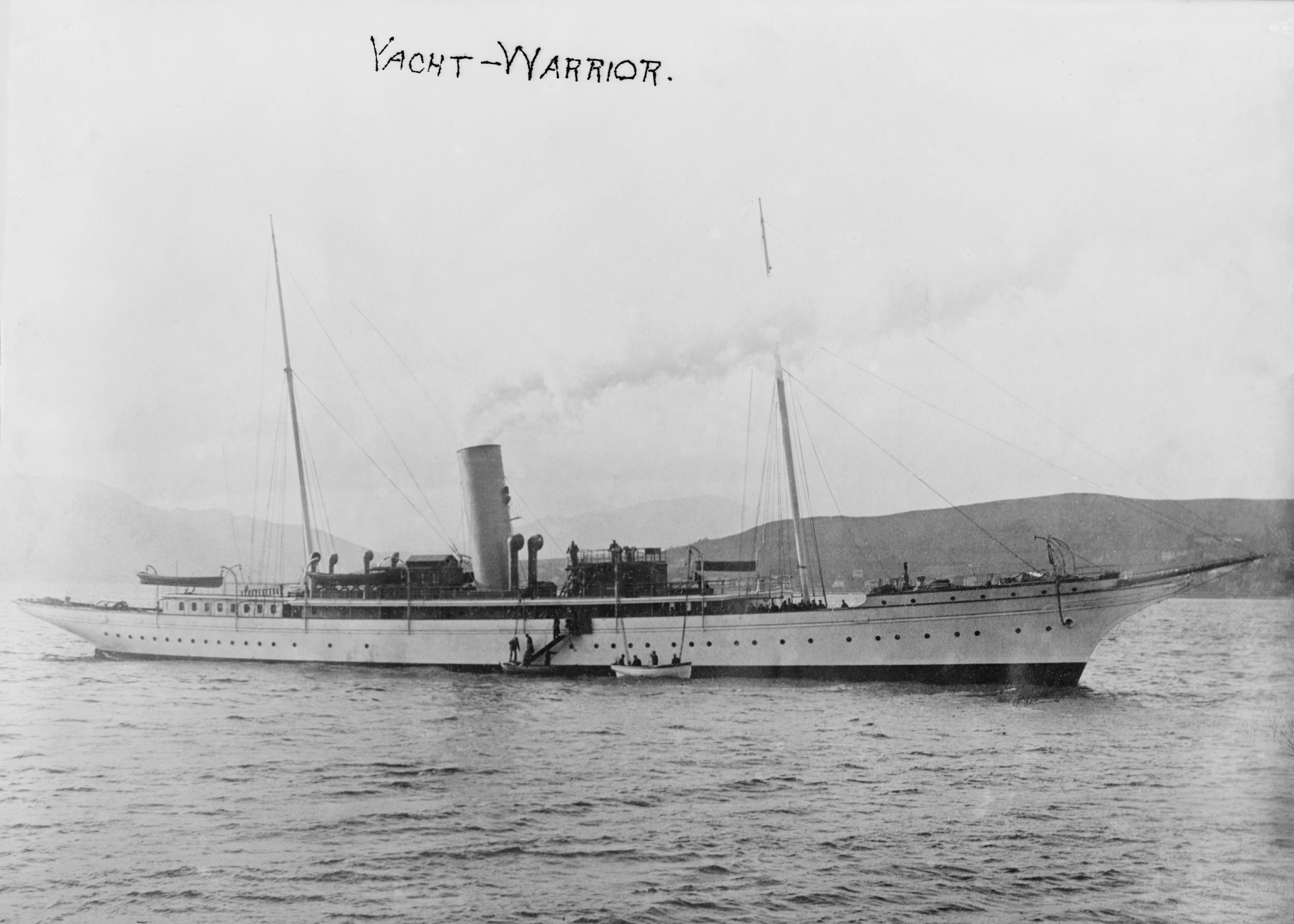
- Warrior in 1910

History
- Name: 1904: Warrior; 1914: Wayfarer; 1915: Warrior; 1920: Goizeko-Izarra; 1937: Warrior; 1939: Warrior II
- Namesake: 1920: Basque for "Morning Star"
- Owner: 1904: Frederick W Vanderbilt; 1914: HP Whitney (possibly); 1914: Alfred G Vanderbilt; 1916: Alexander Smith Cochran; 1920: Ramon de la Sota y Llano; 1936: Executors of R de la Sota; 1937: Rex Morley Hoyes; 1940: Marwell Shipping Co
- Operator: 1914: Harry Payne Whitney; 1917: (United Kingdom) Royal Navy; 1939: (United Kingdom) Royal Navy
- Port of registry: 1904: (United States) New York; 1920: (Spain) Bilbao; 1937: (United Kingdom) Southampton
- Builder: Ailsa Shipbuilding Co, Troon
- Cost: about $400,000 to $500,000
- Yard number: 121
- Launched: 4 February 1904
- Identification: by 1909: code letters KVHJ; 1913: call sign KYW; 1915: call sign WEZ; 1917: pennant number 090; 1937: UK official number 115052; 1937: call sign GZZZ
- Fate: Sunk by air attack, 1940

General characteristics
- Type: steam yacht
- Tonnage: 1905: 1,098 GRT, 396 NRT; 1938: 1,124 GRT, 530 NRT
- Length: 255.3 ft (77.8 m) overall; 238.3 ft (72.6 m) p/p
- Beam: 32.7 ft (10.0 m)
- Draught: 6 ft 0 in (1.83 m)
- Depth: 18.1 ft (5.5 m)
- Decks: 2
- Installed power: 314 NHP or 2,700 ihp
- Propulsion: 2 × triple-expansion engines; 2 × screws
- Speed: 15.7 knots (29 km/h) (sea trial)
- Crew: 1904: 40 or 45; 1914: 48
- Sensors & processing systems: by 1911: submarine signalling
- Armament: 1917: 2 × 12-pounder guns

HMS Warrior was a steel-hulled steam yacht that was launched in Scotland in 1904. Her first owner was Frederick William Vanderbilt. One of his cousins, Alfred Gwynne Vanderbilt, owned her for a few months before he was killed in the sinking of RMS Lusitania. She passed through several owners. She was renamed Wayfarer in 1914, Warrior again in 1915, Goizeko-Izarra in 1920, Warrior again in 1937, and Warrior II in 1939. She was commissioned into the Royal Navy in both world wars, and evacuated Republican child refugees in the Spanish Civil War.

In February 1917, Warrior was commissioned as an armed yacht. She patrolled from Bermuda to the Caribbean until January 1918. In March 1918 she became the flagship of the Commander-in-Chief, North America and West Indies Station. From April 1918 to January 1919 she was moored in Washington, D.C., where she hosted social events to support UK – US diplomatic and naval relations.

In the Second World War the yacht was converted for anti-submarine warfare, and recommissioned as HMS Warrior II. A German air attack sank her in the English Channel in July 1940. Her remains attract recreational wreck divers.

== Building ==
George L Watson designed the yacht; the Ailsa Shipbuilding Company of Troon built her as yard number 121; and she was launched on 4 February 1904 as Warrior. Her lengths were 255.3 ft (77.8 m) overall and 238.3 ft (72.6 m) between perpendiculars. Her beam was 32.7 ft (10.0 m) and her depth was 18.1 ft (5.5 m). Her tonnages were 1,098 GRT and 396 NRT.

Warrior had twin screws, each driven by a four-cylinder triple-expansion engine built by A. & J. Inglis of Glasgow. The combined power of her twin engines was rated at 314 NHP or 2,700 ihp. The yacht carried two lifeboats 26 feet (8 m) long; another lifeboat aft; a steam launch; a motor launch; a gig 24 feet (7.3 m) long; and a dinghy 18 feet (5.5 m) long.

Warrior was built for Frederick William Vanderbilt, who reportedly paid about £100,000 for her (or $400,000 to $500,000 in US Dollars). In March 1894 he and Mrs FW Vanderbilt sailed to Britain to inspect her. On her sea trials in May, Warrior achieved 15.7 knots (29 km/h).

A Parisian firm decorated and furnished the yacht's interior in historicist French styles. The dining saloon was panelled in Spanish walnut, and furnished in Louis XV style. Adjoining it was Mrs Vanderbilt's boudoir, which had a piano. There was a drawing room in Louis XIV style. Mr Vanderbilt's cabin was aft of the engine room, and decorated in Louis XVI style. There were six guest cabins, plus cabins for a medical doctor, a personal secretary, and a maid. She carried a crew of about 40 or 45, and accommodation for officers and crew was in the forward part of the yacht. She was painted white, and her bow was decorated with a figurehead of "a warrior with drawn sword held at an aggressive angle".

== Warrior ==
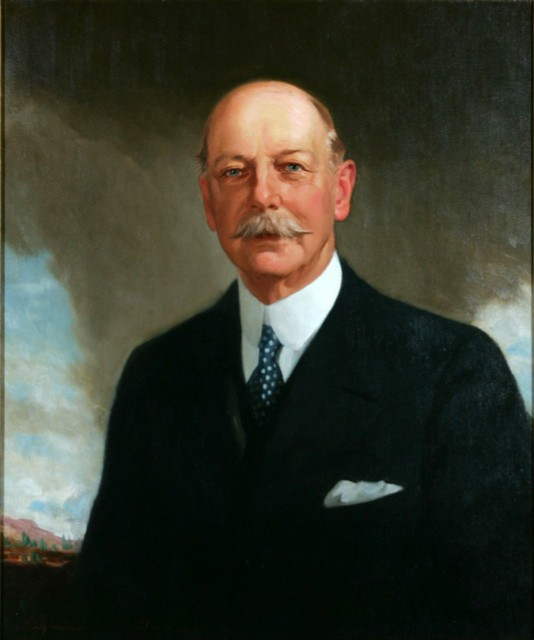
Portrait of Frederick W Vanderbilt by Raymond P. R. Neilson

In June 1904 Mr and Mrs Vanderbilt took Warrior for a cruise in European waters, reportedly including Norway. She was registered at New York, and by 1909 her code letters were KVHJ. She was equipped with submarine signalling by 1911, and wireless telegraphy by 1912. By 1913 her wireless call sign was KYW.

According to The Washington Times, Warrior was the setting for several high society courtships. Albert Zabriskie Gray and Marian Anthon Fish, a daughter of Stuyvesant Fish, were guests of Mrs FW Vanderbilt aboard Warrior on a cruise up the St. Lawrence River, and announced their engagement shortly afterward. Count László Széchenyi courted Gladys Vanderbilt aboard the yacht, and they couple were married in 1908. William Laimbeer courted Nathalie Schenck Collins aboard Warrior, and they were married in 1909.

== 1914 grounding ==
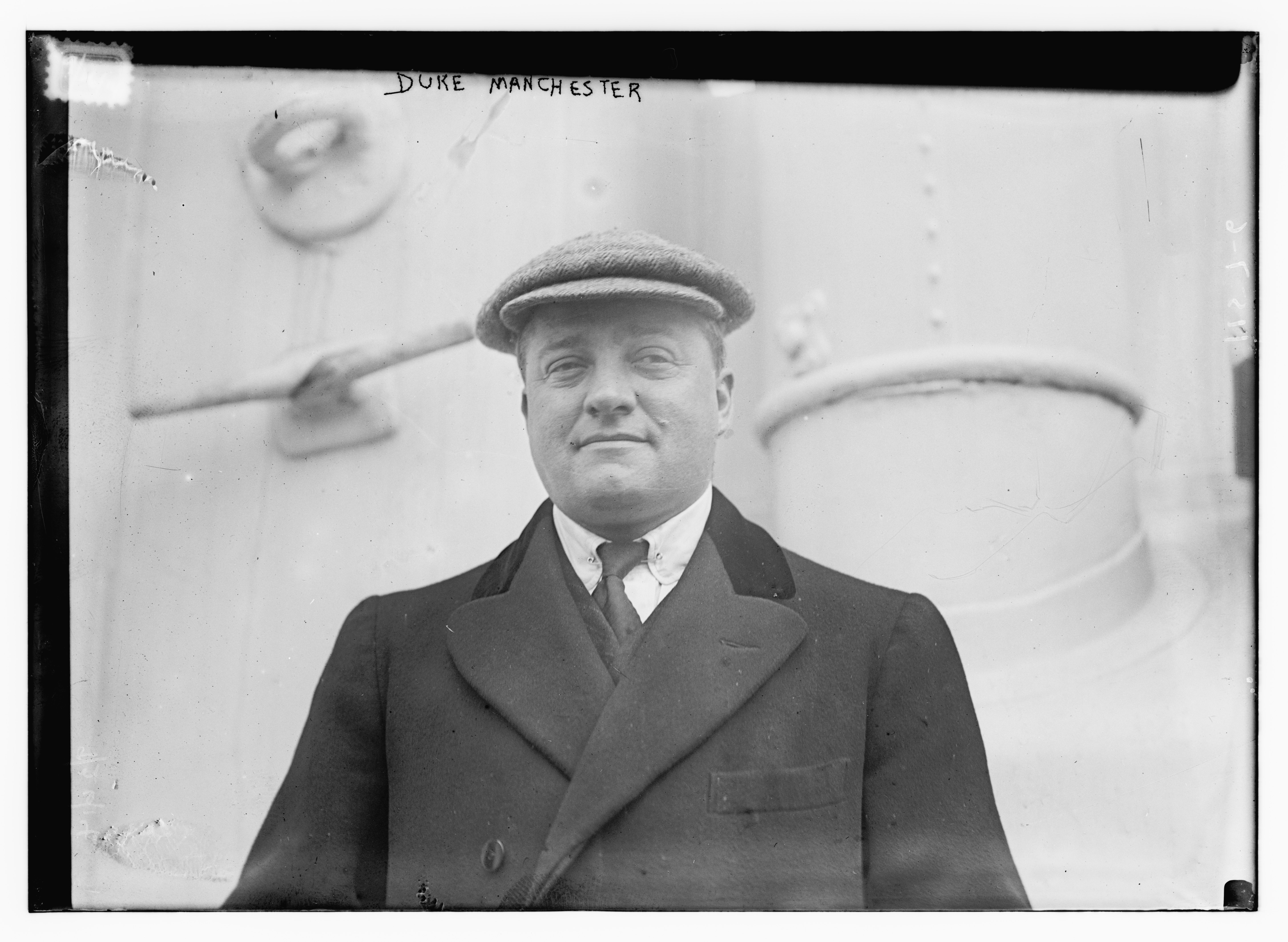
William Montagu, 9th Duke of Manchester

On 23 December 1913, Warrior left New York for a cruise. She carried a crew of 48; plus Mr and Mrs FW Vanderbilt; guests including the Duke and Duchess of Manchester and Lord Falconer; and servants of the Vanderbilts and their guests. Warrior called at Charleston; Palm Beach; and Bermuda; and then crossed the Caribbean to the Colombian coast.

At 05:00 hrs 26 January 1914 Warrior was in passage from Curaçao to Colón when she grounded on a sand or mud bank in a heavy sea off Cape Aguatia, near the mouth of the Magdalena River, three miles northwest of the Rio Magdalena lighthouse.

Warrior transmitted a wireless distress signal, which the Marconi Company wireless station at Santa Marta received. the Norwegian steamship Frutera, under charter to the United Fruit Company, was at anchor in Santa Marta harbour. She was sent to Warrior, and arrived at about 17:00 hrs on 26 January. The sea was too rough to lower lifeboats, so Frutera stood by overnight. The Tropical Fruit Company steamship Almirante, also under charter to United Fruit, was in Santa Marta loading cargo. She hurriedly completed loading, and then at 23:30 hrs left port to join Frutera. Almirante arrived at about 03:10 hrs on 27 January, by which time the storm had abated slightly.

Frutera and Almirante each lowered a lifeboat to try to reach Warrior. The heavy sea capsized Frutera's boat, but the crew of Almirante's boat rescued them all. At about 10:00 hrs Almirante again sent a lifeboat, which this time succeeded in reaching Warrior and rescuing all her passengers. The yacht's crew chose to remain aboard Warrior to await the arrival of a salvage tug from Kingston, Jamaica. Almirante continued to stand by, and the tug arrived about 18:00 hrs on 29 January, but by then the wind and sea were too heavy to allow a line to be thrown aboard Warrior. Almirante, having perishable cargo aboard, resumed her voyage on 31 January, leaving the Merritt and Chapman salvage tug Relief to continue to stand by Warrior.

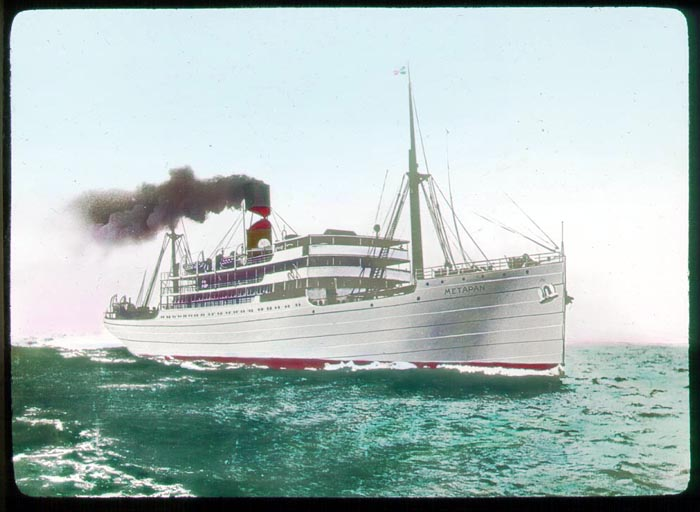
Tropical Fruit Company steamship Metapan

Almirante sailed via Colón and Kingston to New York, where she arrived on 6 February. Also by 6 February, all but ten of Warrior's crew had been rescued, and were aboard the Tropical Fruit Company steamship Metapan, which would bring them back to the US.

By 10 February a hurricane had driven Warrior further ashore, and had also damaged the tug Relief. The tug's 's windlass was smashed, and she lost both of her anchors, so she went to Savanilla for repairs. By 13 February another seven members of the yacht's crew had abandoned ship, leaving only the captain and two crewmen aboard Warrior. The seven reached New York on 23 February aboard the Hamburg America Line steamship Albingia.

Merritt & Chapman salvage tug Relief

On 11 March it was reported that Relief had hauled Warrior half a mile off the mud bank, but a hurricane arrived, forced the tug to let the yacht go, and drove the yacht back onto the mud. On 9 April Relief reached Kingston with Warrior in tow, and only slightly damaged. Relief then towed Warrior to New York, leaving Kingston on 14 April, and reaching New York on 21 April.

== Wayfarer ==
Because of the accident to Warrior, FW Vanderbilt gave up yachting for a while. By 19 May 1914, the horse breeder Harry Payne Whitney was reported to have bought Warrior for about $100,000. Whitney was married to Gertrude Vanderbilt, a cousin of FW Vanderbilt. Mr and Mrs Whitney used Warrior to sail between Newport, Rhode Island and New York, and to entertain guests. However, in 1916 it was reported that Whitney had only chartered Warrior from her underwriters, to whom FW Vanderbilt had turned her over.

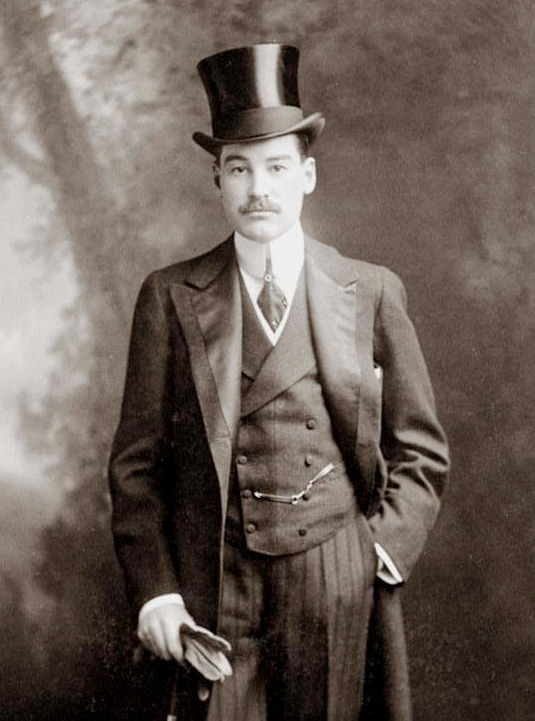
Alfred Gwynne Vanderbilt

By 29 November 1914 Alfred Gwynne Vanderbilt, a brother of Gertrude Vanderbilt Whitney, had acquired Warrior. He renamed her Wayfarer, which was the same name as his private railroad car. AG Vanderbilt had Wayfarer fitted out with a nursery for his younger children. On 30 January 1915, the family left New York aboard the yacht for a cruise to Los Angeles via the Panama Canal, which had opened only a few months previously. By 25 March, AG Vanderbilt was aboard Wayfarer in Havana, Cuba, to see the World Heavyweight boxing championship fight between Jess Willard and Jack Johnson. Also by 1915, Wayfarer's wireless call sign had been changed to WEZ.

On 7 May 1915, AG Vanderbilt was killed in the sinking of RMS Lusitania. By 16 April 1916, Alexander Smith Cochran had bought the yacht from AG Vanderbilt's estate, and restored her name to Warrior. On 19 July 1916 she ran aground in fog on Race Rock, on the west side of Fishers Island, New York. The TA Scott salvage company of New London, Connecticut received her wireless distress signal, and sent salvage tugs and lighters to assist. Warrior was refloated at high tide, and reached New London under her own steam. She underwent temporary repairs to her bow at Riverside, Connecticut, where she left on 21 July to return to Brooklyn under her own power to undergo permanent repairs. In December 1916, Cochran arrived in San Francisco aboard Warrior, having sailed via the Panama Canal.

== HMS Warrior ==
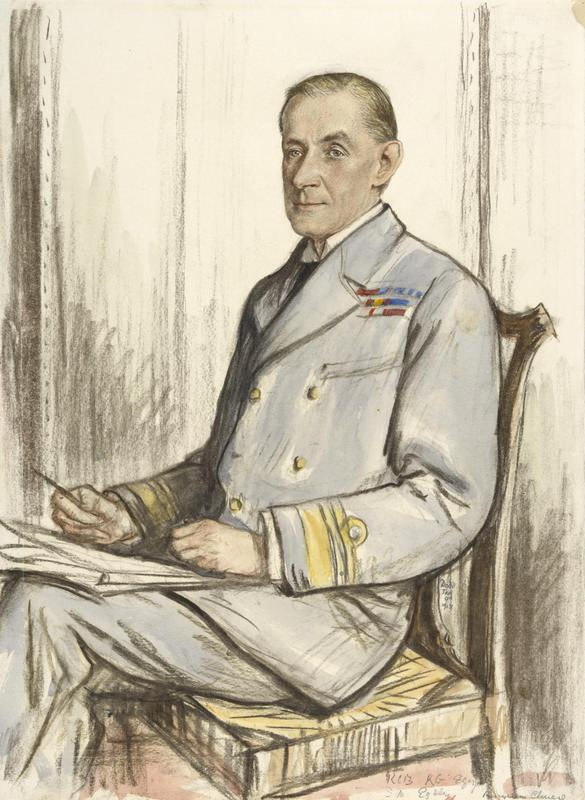
Vice-Admiral William Grant

By 22 February 1917 the United Kingdom Admiralty was reported to have bought Warrior at Kingston, Jamaica. However, Royal Navy records list her among "hired yachts", which suggests that she was chartered rather than bought. After the war, the New York Tribune reported that Cochran had "presented" Warrior to the UK government, and that he had been commissioned into the Royal Navy to command her.

She was armed with two 12-pounder guns, and commissioned as HMS Warrior, with the pennant number 090.

By 1 July 1917, Warrior was in Bermuda. From there she patrolled to Kingston, Saint Lucia, Saint Kitts, Antigua, Barbados, Trinidad, Grenada, Dominica, and Belize; arriving back at Bermuda on 23 January 1918. In 1918, Vice-Admiral William Grant was appointed Commander-in-Chief, North America and West Indies Station. On 16 February he raised his flag aboard Warrior, making her his flagship. She left Bermuda that day, and arrived in Halifax, Nova Scotia on 20 February.> Warrior left Halifax on 23 March, and arrived in Washington, DC on 28 March.

On 30 May 1918, Warrior, the tug USS Wicomico, and a United States Navy floatplane took part in a ceremony for Decoration Day (now Memorial Day) honouring those who had died at sea during the war, and particularly in the sinking of RMS Lusitania and troopship Tuscania. The film actress Rita Jolivet, who survived the sinking of the Lusitania, took part. Wreaths, including ones from First Lady Edith Wilson, and from Cunard Line, were laid from Warrior and Wicomico at the confluence of the Anacostia and Potomac rivers. The floatplane flew low and dropped flowers onto the river. A pastor offered brayers from the Aqueduct Bridge, as United States Marines on the bridge formed a guard of honour.

On 16 September 1918, Warrior's Second Engineer died of mesenteric venous thrombosis. He was buried on 19 September in Arlington National Cemetery. Sickness was recorded aboard the yacht continuously from 26 September to 30 November 1918, and again from 21 December until at least 31 December. Much of this was either the Spanish flu pandemic, or secondary infections such as pneumonia arising from the pandemic. Infections peaked on 16 October, when 22 crewmen were listed as sick. Serious cases were discharged to the US Navy hospital in Washington. Four members of Warrior's company died between 16 October and 21 December: one deck hand; one "writer" (clerk); and two Royal Marines. All are buried in Arlington National Cemetery.

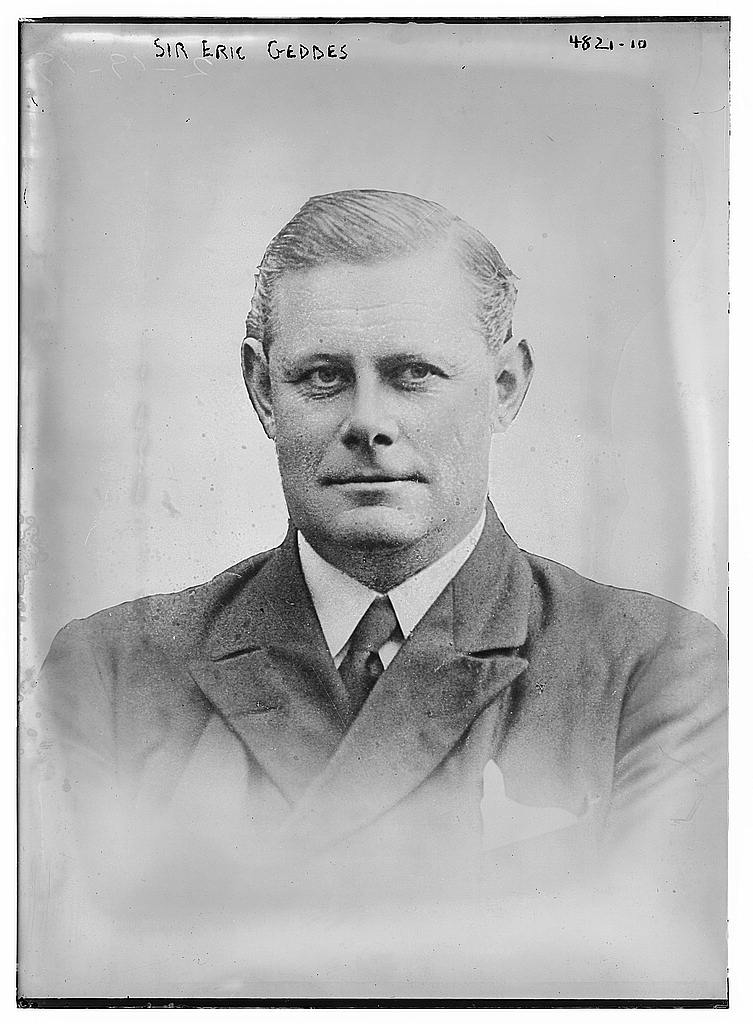
Eric Geddes, First Lord of the Admiralty, in 1918

Breaking with naval tradition, the Admiralty allowed Lady Grant to live aboard Warrior with her husband. This was for the couple to host social events aboard the flagship in Washington. On 9 October the couple hosted a reception aboard Warrior to introduce Eric Geddes, First Lord of the Admiralty, to Washington society. Guests included US Navy Secretary Josephus Daniels, the Brazilian and Italian ambassadors, and senior members of the staff of the British and French embassies. The reception was described as an addition to "the long list of their graceful hospitalities since the ship — their home — anchored in the Potomac".

Warrior's officers proved popular with Washington socialites. Grant's Flag Lieutenant, Charles Fellowes-Gordon, courted Sara Price Collier, a New York socialite. On 14 November, Collier's mother announced the couple's engagement. Their wedding was on 30 December at St. John's Episcopal Church, Lafayette Square. Franklin D. Roosevelt, then Assistant Secretary of the Navy, was the bride's godfather, and gave her away. Katharine St. George was her sister, and was her Maid of Honour. Senior members of Government including Frank Polk, Franklin Knight Lane, and Josephus Daniels were among the guests, along with the staffs of the British, French, and Italian embassies.

Lady Grant missed the wedding, having left Washington by 24 November 1918 to return home. On 3 January 1919, Warrior's crew gave a farewell dance at the Naval Reserve Armory. Warrior was due to leave Washington for New York on 17 or 18 January. On 8 February, Vice-Admiral Grant left New York for home aboard RMS Adriatic. The UK Admiralty returned Warrior to Cochran, and by 25 May 1919 she was in a shipyard in South Brooklyn being refitted to return to civilian service.

== Goizeko-Izarra ==
Cochran still owned Warrior in February 1920. However, by May 1920 the industrialist and Basque nationalist Ramon de la Sota y Llano had bought her, renamed her Goizeko-Izarra, and registered her in Bilbao in Spain. "Goizeko-Izarra" is Basque for "Morning Star", a traditional name for the planet Venus. De la Sota already owned a steam yacht that he had renamed Goizeko-Izarra: the former Tuscarora. But Warrior was larger, and de la Sota sold the earlier Tuscarora in 1922. By May 1936, the new Goizeko-Izarra had been converted to burn oil fuel. Ailsa had built her as a coal-burner, and had remained so until throughout the First World War.

On 17 July 1936, Nationalist insurgents began the Spanish Civil War. De la Sota died a month later, on 17 August 1936, leaving Goizeko-Izarra in the hands of his executors. Early in May 1937, it was reported that the Compañía Transatlántica Española ocean liner Habana and a vessel called Goizeko-Izarra had sailed from the Republican-held Basque port of Santurtzi, carrying more than 2,000 child refugees between them to La Pallice in France. One of those reports described Goizeko-Izarra as a "small fishing trawler", so it is not clear whether this was the same Goizeko-Izarra as the late de la Sota's yacht.

Later that month, Nationalists claimed that their aircraft had hit Goizeko-Izarra and set her on fire as she made for Pauillac. In fact she reached Le Verdon-sur-Mer, where she landed another 300 to 400 refugees, and those aboard denied the ship had been attacked. In these reports, newspapers described her as a "Basque yacht".

Republican sources denied reports that on this second voyage Goizeko-Izarra carried treasure sent abroad for safe keeping by the Basque government. The alleged treasure was variously described as "$500,000 worth of gems and gold", or "gold and jewelry worth $50,000,000".

== Warrior again ==
Before the end of 1937, a Rex Morley Hoyes of Marwell Hall, Hampshire had acquired the yacht. Hoyes was linked with the Cunliffe-Owen Aircraft company. Her name was reverted to Warrior, she was registered in Southampton, and her tonnages were revised to 1,124 GRT and 530 NRT. She had the UK official number 115052 and wireless call sign GZZZ. By 1940 she was registered as Warrior II, and her owner was "The Marwell Shipping Co, Ltd", also of Marwell Hall, which may therefore have been a company linked with Hoyes.

In the Second World War the Admiralty requisitioned the yacht, had her converted for anti-submarine warfare, and commissioned her as HMS Warrior II. On 11 July 1940, German aircraft bombed her in the English Channel, killing one of her ratings. She sank off Portland Bill at position 50°21′56″N 02°12′23″W.

Her wreck lies at a depth of 177 to 197 feet (54 to 60 m), and is a wreck diving site. Her bell, with the name Goizejo-Izarra cast into it, has been recovered, but was broken into two pieces in the process.

== Bibliography ==
- Glidden, H Coy, ed. (1904). "'". Sail and Sweep. Vol. III. Sail and Sweep Publishing Co – via Google Books.
- Lloyd's Register of Yachts. London: Lloyd's Register of Shipping. 1905 – via Internet Archive.
- Lloyd's Register of Yachts. London: Lloyd's Register of Shipping. 1909 – via Internet Archive.
- Lloyd's Register of Yachts. London: Lloyd's Register of Shipping. 1911 – via Internet Archive.
- Lloyd's Register of Yachts. London: Lloyd's Register of Shipping. 1912 – via Internet Archive.
- Lloyd's Register of Yachts. London: Lloyd's Register of Shipping. 1915 – via Internet Archive.
- Lloyd's Register of Yachts. London: Lloyd's Register of Shipping. 1919 – via Internet Archive.
- Lloyd's Register of Yachts. London: Lloyd's Register of Shipping. 1920 – via Internet Archive.
- Lloyd's Register of Yachts. London: Lloyd's Register of Shipping. 1936 – via Internet Archive.
- Lloyd's Register of Yachts. London: Lloyd's Register of Shipping. 1937 – via Internet Archive.
- Lloyd's Register of Yachts. London: Lloyd's Register of Shipping. 1938 – via Internet Archive.
- The Marconi Press Agency Ltd (1913). The Year Book of Wireless Telegraphy and Telephony. London: The St Katherine Press.
- Mercantile Navy List. London. 1938 – via Crew List Index Project.
- Mercantile Navy List. London. 1940 – via Crew List Index Project.
- United States Department of Commerce (1915). Forty-Seventh Annual List of Merchant Vessels of the United States. Washington, DC: Government Printing Office – via Google Books.
- United States Department of Commerce (1916). Forty-Eighth Annual List of Merchant Vessels of the United States. Washington, DC: Government Printing Office – via HathiTrust.
- Yacht Register. London: Lloyd's Register of British and Foreign Shipping. 1904 – via Internet Archive.
