= USS Relief (ID-2170) =

Salvage tug requisitioned by the US Navy

- Relief in Merritt & Chapman service

History

United States
- Name: Relief
- Owner: 1907: Merritt & Chapman; 1923: Merritt-Chapman & Scott
- Operator: 1918–19: United States Navy
- Port of registry: New York
- Builder: Harlan and Hollingsworth, Wilmington, DE
- Completed: 1907
- Acquired: for US Navy, 8 August 1918
- Commissioned: into US Navy, 19 August 1918
- Decommissioned: 14 May 1919
- Identification: US official number 203988; 1907: code letters KWBH; by 1914: call sign KRJ; 1918: pennant number SP-2170; by 1934: call sign WHCZ
- Fate: scrapped by 1953

General characteristics
- Type: salvage tug
- Tonnage: 828 GRT, 563 NRT
- Displacement: 1,386 tons
- Length: 200.0 ft (61.0 m) overall; 184.6 ft (56.3 m) p/p
- Beam: 30.2 ft (9.2 m)
- Draft: 15 ft 5 in (4.70 m)
- Depth: 20.6 ft (6.3 m)
- Decks: 2
- Installed power: 137 NHP
- Propulsion: 1 × triple-expansion engine; 1 × screw
- Speed: 14 1/2 knots (27 km/h)
- Complement: 58
- Sensors & processing systems: by 1930: wireless direction finding

USS Relief (SP-2170) was a salvage tug that was built in Delaware in 1907 and scrapped in 1953. She served in the United States Navy in the First World War from 1918 to 1919, and provided civilian support to the Navy in the Second World War from 1942 to 1945. She belonged to the Merritt & Chapman Derrick & Wrecking Co, which in the 1920s became Merritt-Chapman & Scott. She rescued the steam yacht Warrior in 1914, and survived a collision with a US Navy patrol vessel in 1918.

== Description ==
Harlan and Hollingsworth of Wilmington, Delaware built Relief, completing her in 1907. Her lengths were 200.0 ft (61.0 m) overall

and 184.6 ft (56.3 m) between perpendiculars Her beam was 30.2 ft (9.2 m); her depth was 20.6 ft (6.3 m); and her draft was 15 ft 5 in (4.70 m). Her tonnages were 828 GRT; 563 NRT; and 1,386 tons displacement. She had a single screw, driven by a three-cylinder triple-expansion engine that was rated at 137 NHP and gave her a speed of 14 1/2 knots (27 km/h).

Merritt & Chapman registered Relief in New York. Her US official number was 203988 and her code letters were KWBH. By 1910 she was equipped with wireless telegraphy. By 1914 her wireless call sign was KRJ.

== Warrior rescue ==
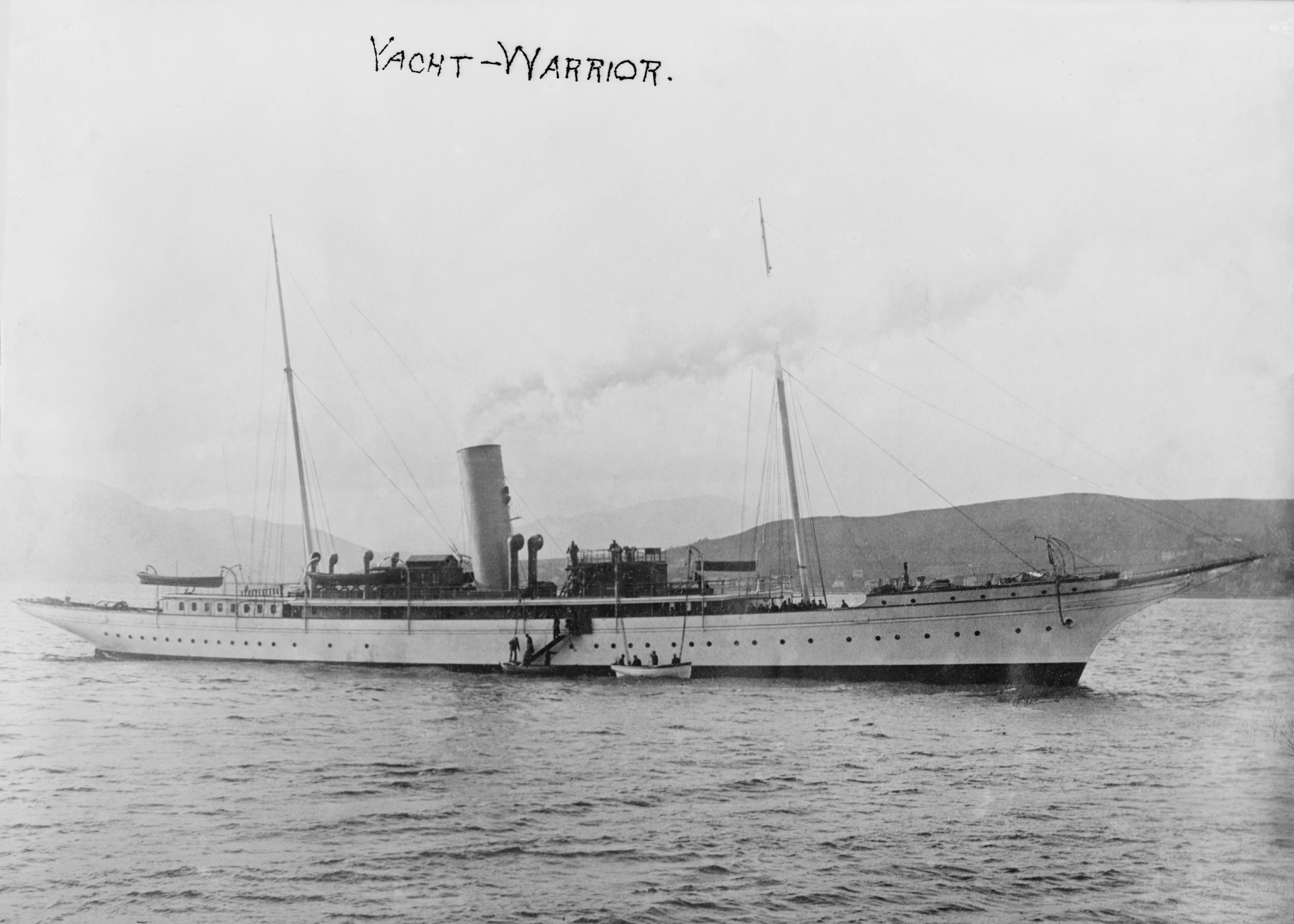
Warrior in 1910

On the morning of 26 January 1914, Frederick William Vanderbilt's steam yacht Warrior ran aground on a sand or mud bank near the mouth of the Magdalena River on the Caribbean coast of Colombia. She was carrying Mr and Mrs FW Vanderbilt and their guests: the Duke and Duchess of Manchester, and Lord Falconer. The Tropical Fruit Company steamship Almirante reached Warrior the next day, and sent a lifeboat which rescued the Vanderbilts, their guests, and their personal servants. The yacht's 48 crew chose to remain aboard Warrior to await the arrival of a salvage tug.

Relief was sent from Kingston, Jamaica, and arrived on the afternoon of 29 January. By then the wind and sea were too heavy to allow a line to be thrown aboard Warrior. Almirante resumed her voyage, leaving Relief to continue to stand by the yacht.

By 6 February, all but ten of Warrior's crew had been rescued, and were aboard the Tropical Fruit Company steamship Metapan, which took them back to the US.

By 10 February, a hurricane had driven Warrior further ashore; smashed Relief's windlass; and caused the tug to lose both of her anchors. Relief went to Savanilla for repairs. By 13 February another seven members of the yacht's crew had abandoned ship, leaving only the captain and two crewmen aboard Warrior. The seven reached New York on 23 February aboard the Hamburg America Line steamship Albingia.

On 11 March it was reported that Relief had hauled Warrior half a mile off the mud bank, but another hurricane came, forced the tug to let the yacht go, and drove the yacht back onto the mud. On 9 April Relief reached Kingston with Warrior in tow, and only slightly damaged. Relief then towed Warrior to New York, leaving Kingston on 14 April, and reaching New York on 21 April.

== Subsequent career ==
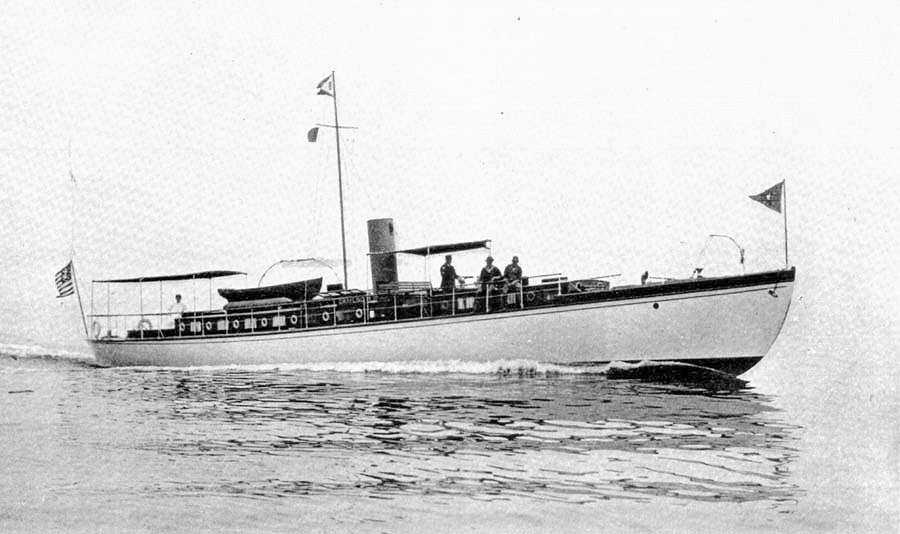
Patrol boat USS Williams

Relief was acquired for US Navy service on 8 August 1918. She was commissioned on 19 August as USS Relief, with the pennant number SP-2170. She was assigned to the 3rd Naval District, and was a salvage and wrecking tug on the New York area. On 27 September 1918 she collided with the patrol vessel USS Williams, and Williams was slightly damaged. Relief was returned to her owners on 14 May 1919.

By 1930, Relief was equipped with wireless direction finding. By 1934, her wireless call sign was WHCZ, and this had superseded her code letters.

In the Second World War, Relief served the Navy again from 14 January 1942. Merritt-Chapman and Scott continued to operate her, but under the direction of the Bureau of Ships. After the war she returned to civilian service. She had been scrapped by 1953.

== Bibliography ==
- Lloyd's Register of British and Foreign Shipping. Vol. I.–Steamers. London: Lloyd's Register of Shipping. 1907 – via Internet Archive.
- Lloyd's Register of British and Foreign Shipping. Vol. I.–Steamers. London: Lloyd's Register of Shipping. 1910 – via Internet Archive.
- Lloyd's Register of Shipping. Vol. II.–Steamers and Motorships. London: Lloyd's Register of Shipping. 1924 – via Internet Archive.
- Lloyd's Register of Shipping (PDF). Vol. II.–Steamers and Motorships. London: Lloyd's Register of Shipping. 1930 – via Southampton City Council.
- Lloyd's Register of Shipping (PDF). Vol. II.–Steamers and Motorships. London: Lloyd's Register of Shipping. 1934 – via Southampton City Council.
- The Marconi Press Agency Ltd (1914). The Year Book of Wireless Telegraphy and Telephony. London: The Marconi Press Agency Ltd.
- Register Book. Vol. II. M–Z. London: Lloyd's Register of Shipping. 1952 – via Internet Archive.
