= Lipsett (disambiguation) =

Lipsett may refer to:

- Lipsett, Irish surname, and people with that surname
- Lipsett Hardware Building, Pickford, Michigan, United States
- Lipsett Diaries (French: Les journaux de Lipsett), 2010 documentary
