= Iris Vinton =

American writer

Iris Vinton (1905–1988) was an American writer of children's literature. She wrote several children's historical stories, mostly based on fact. One of her books, Flying Ebony (1956), was turned into a Walt Disney production titled Mooncussers in 1962.

== Biography ==
Vinton was born in West Point, Mississippi and moved to New York in the 1930s. Iris was the daughter of William Lewis and Maude Best Vinton. She was married to Louis German, who died in 1969. She received an AB degree from the Incarnate Word College, now University of the Incarnate Word in 1928.

She wrote several children's historical stories, mostly based on fact. Flying Ebony (1947) was made into a film called Mooncussers. Summary: "Jonathan is too young to go to sea, but when Captain Dan leaves his horse Black Ebony for Jonathan to look after while the Captain’s at sea, Jonathan makes himself useful by riding up and down the coastline during storms, looking for ships in distress." Vinton "was also one of the cohort of authors who contributed to the immensely long Nancy Drew series."

Vinton was the director of publications for the Boys & Girls Clubs of America for 20 years. Vinton was also on the editorial board of Scholastic Books and Magazines, part of the Scholastic Corporation.

== Death ==
Vinton died in 1988 of breast cancer at her home in Manhattan. She was 82 years old.

== Bibliography ==
- Vinton, Iris. The Story of John Paul Jones. New York: Scholastic Book Services, 1971. Illustrated by David Lockhart. 156 pages.
- Vinton, Iris. The Story of Edith Cavell. New York: Grosset & Dunlap, 1959. Summary: The story of Edith Cavell, the English nurse who was shot by the Germans, in Belgium during World War I, for aiding over 200 British and French soldiers to escape. Illustrated by Gerald McCann. 176 pages.
- Vinton, Iris, and Herman B. Vestal. Look Out for Pirates! New York: Beginner Books, 1961. Illustrated by H.B. Vestal. 64 pages.
- Vinton, Iris, and John Alan Maxwell. The Story of Robert E. Lee. New York: Grosset & Dunlap, 1952. Abstract: A simple biography of the general who commanded the Southern Army during the Civil War.
- Vinton, Iris, and Alex D'Amato. The Folkways Omnibus of Children's Games. [New York]: Hawthorn Books, 1973. Illustrated by Alex D'Amato. 320 pages.
- Vinton, Iris, and Graham Kaye. The Story of Stephen Decatur. New York: Grosset & Dunlap, 1954. Illustrated by Graham Kaye. 181 pages.
- Vinton, Iris. Boy on the Mayflower. New York: Scholastic, 1970. Illustrated by Jon Nielson. 63 pages.
- Vinton, Iris. We Were There with Jean Lafitte at New Orleans. New York: Grosset & Dunlap, 1957. Historical consultant: Robert Tallant. Illustrated by Robert Glaubke. 182 pages.
- Vinton, Iris. The Story of President Kennedy. New York: Grosset & Dunlap, 1966. Summary: A biography of John Fitzgerald Kennedy from his early political awakening, inspired by his colorful grandfather "Honey Fitz," to his too brief but very inspiring term as thirty-fifth President. Illustrated by Carl Cassler. Cover portrait by Earl Mayan.
- Vinton, Iris, and Addison Burbank. Laffy of the Navy Salvage Divers. New York: Dodd, Mead & Co, 1944. Drawings by Addison Burbank. 159 pages.
- Vinton, Iris. The Black Horse Company. New York: Dodd, Mead, 1950. 273 pages. Abstract: "Jonathan loses his job as messenger for the coast guard, but gets a far better one as look out for a salvage company. He still has his horse, Ebony, but there’s now added action with the abandoned schooner, Zanadu."
- Vinton, Iris. Our Nation's Builders. Columbus, Ohio: Charles E. Merrill, 1968. For grades 5-8. 403 pages.
- Vinton, Iris, and Leo Summers. Missy and the Mountain Lion. Syracuse: L.W. Singer, 1967. illustrated by Leo Summers.
- Vinton, Iris. Passage to Texas. New York: Aladdin Books, 1952. Summary: Experiences aboard a Mississippi flat boat as a group of prospective settlers emigrate to the Texas wilderness in 1822. Grades 5-7.
- Vinton, Iris. Longbow Island. 322 pages. New York: Dodd, Mead, 1957.
- Vinton, Iris. Now That You Are 9. [New York]: Association Press, 1963. Pictures by Leonhard Shortall. 55 pages.
- Vinton, Iris. Buried Treasure. A Comedy in One Act. Chicago: Dramatic Pub. Co, 1932. 16 pages.
- Vinton, Iris. John Paul Jones. Scholastic Book Services, 1959. 156 pages.
- Vinton, Iris, and Marc Simont. Flying Ebony. New York: Dodd, Mead, 1956. Illustrated by Marc Simont. 286 pages. Iris Vinton, a noted author of young adult novels, wrote "Flying Ebony", a story about the origins of the Life Saving Benevolent Association of New York and the story behind the black horse shown on the corporate flag. "The memory of the black horse of this book is preserved as a symbol to this day on the house flag of Merritt-Chapman & Scott Corporation, the great ship salvage firm."
