= Hell Below =

1933 film directed by Jack Conway

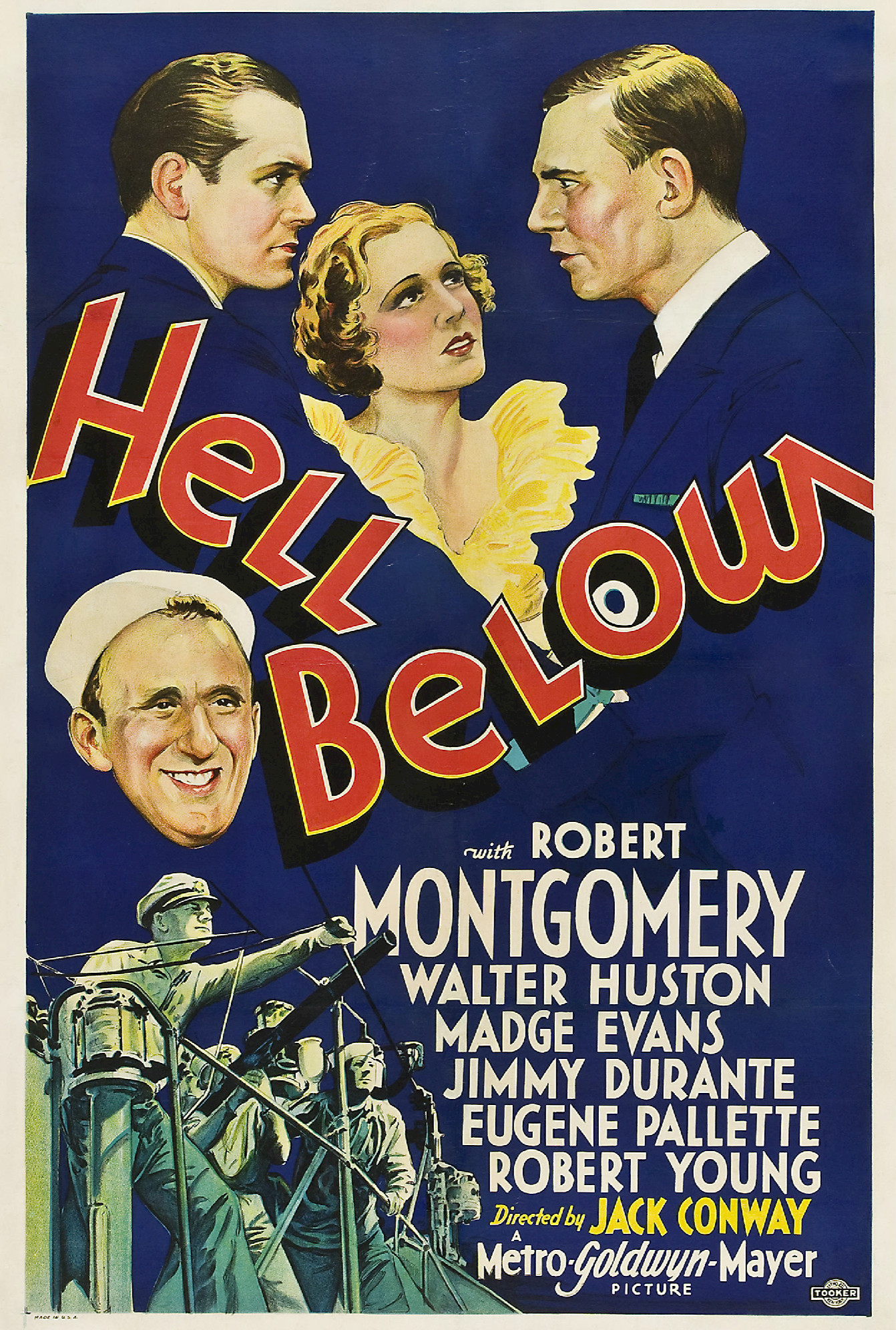
- Theatrical release poster
- Directed by: Jack Conway
- Screenplay by: Laird Doyle; Raymond L. Schrock; John Lee Mahin; John Meehan
- Based on: Pigboats; 1931 novel by Edward Ellsberg
- Produced by: Jack Conway
- Starring: Robert Montgomery; Walter Huston; Madge Evans
- Cinematography: Harold Rosson
- Edited by: Hal C. Kern
- Music by: William Axt
- Production company: Metro-Goldwyn-Mayer
- Distributed by: Loew's Inc.
- Release date: April 25, 1933 (New York)
- Running time: 101 minutes
- Country: United States
- Language: English
- Budget: $895,000
- Box office: $1,389,000

Hell Below (aka Pigboats) is a 1933 American MGM pre-Code film set in the Adriatic Sea during World War I about submarine warfare based on Commander Edward Ellsberg's novel Pigboats. The film stars Robert Montgomery, Walter Huston, Robert Young, Madge Evans and Jimmy Durante.

== Plot ==
In 1918 during World War I, the United States Navy submarine AL-14 is sent with the rest of Submarine Flotilla 1 to Taranto to fight in the Adriatic Sea. The submarine's commander was wounded on its last cruise, and Lieutenant Thomas Knowlton, his second in command, expects to be promoted and take his place. However, Lieutenant Commander T. J. Toler shows up and takes over.

Toler orders his officers to attend a ball. The young men dread having to dance with the wives of admirals, but Knowlton and his close friend and shipmate, Lieutenant Ed "Brick" Walters, are pleasantly surprised to discover the beautiful Joan Standish among the attendees. When an enemy air raid forces everyone to take shelter, Knowlton takes Joan to his apartment. Though she insists on leaving, he can tell she is attracted to him. However, before anything can happen, Toler shows up to collect his daughter.

On its next patrol, the AL-14 torpedoes an Austro-Hungarian minelayer. After the Austrians abandon ship, Toler sends Brick and three sailors to search the sinking vessel for code books. When enemy biplane fighters attack, Toler fights them off, but the arrival of a bomber forces him to order the AL-14 to submerge and leave his boarding party behind. Knowlton disobeys his order and remains on deck, manning a machine gun. "Mac" MacDougal has to knock him unconscious and carry him below. Brick and his men are killed by the fighters.

Upon returning to port, Knowlton goes to see Joan at the hospital. There he encounters patient Flight Commander Herbert Standish, who turns out to be Joan's paraplegic husband. Knowlton departs, but Joan follows him and confesses she loves him.

Back at sea, Toler tries to get Knowlton to break off the relationship, to no avail. Toler is ordered to map where new minelayers, now escorted by destroyers, are planting their mines. However, when Knowlton spots Brick's boat through the periscope, he imagines he sees his friend still alive. He countermands Toler's orders and attacks. Two enemy ships are sunk, but one destroyer evades the torpedoes and forces the AL-14 to dive to the sea bottom, 65 feet (20 m) below its maximum safe depth. The hull survives intact but the batteries begin leaking chlorine. After a while, Toler decides to surface, preferring to die fighting rather than suffocate. However, a crucial pump will not work. When it appears that they are doomed, one crewman commits suicide. Repairs enable the submarine to surface, to find the enemy gone. Eight crewmen are "down" as a result of Knowlton's actions.

He is court-martialed and discharged from the Navy in disgrace. He and Joan plan to run away together, much to Toler's disgust. When Knowlton goes to the hospital to inform Joan's husband, he learns that a successful operation makes it likely that the man will recover fully. Knowlton puts on an act for Joan and her father, pretending to be so callous that she is repulsed.

Toler is given an extremely hazardous mission. To block Durazzo, the only port in the Adriatic from which Austro-Hungarian submarines can operate, the AL-14 is loaded with explosives and sent to ram a fortification beside the narrowest point in the channel out of the port. The rubble would block the exit. When Knowlton sneaks aboard, Toler lets him stay. Under cover of a battleship bombardment, the AL-14 surfaces and heads in. The rest of the crew abandon ship as planned, leaving only Toler and Knowlton. Toler orders Knowlton over the side, but he pushes Toler overboard instead and steers the ship to its target, sacrificing his life.

== Cast ==
- Robert Montgomery as Lieutenant Thomas Knowlton, USN
- Walter Huston as Lieutenant Commander T. J. Toler, USN
- Madge Evans as Joan Standish
- Jimmy Durante as "Ptomaine", the cook
- Eugene Pallette as "Mac" MacDougal
- Robert Young as Lieutenant (jg) Ed "Brick" Walters
- Edwin Styles as Flight Commander Herbert Standish
- John Lee Mahin as Lieutenant (jg) "Speed" Nelson
- David Newell as Lieutenant (jg) Radford
- Sterling Holloway as Seaman Jenks

== Production ==
On January 5, 1933, just after production on the film began, the entertainment trade paper The Hollywood Reporter announced that Madge Evans had "started work on it yesterday" and that MGM had changed the picture's intended release name, Pigboats, to the more sensational title Hell Below.

The USS S-31 played the fictional U.S. submarine AL-14. MGM purchased the USS Moody (DD-277), a World War I-era destroyer destined for scrapping due to the London Naval Treaty limits on navy strength, for US$35,000. The firm of Merritt-Chapman & Scott was hired to sink the ship to simulate the torpedoing of an Austro-Hungarian minelayer. Principal location photography took place in Honolulu and Pearl Harbor, Hawaii. (Note: Runtime for Hell Below has been reported to vary widely from 78 to 155 minutes, but the accepted time is 101 minutes.)

== Release ==
The film opened at the Astor Theatre in New York City on April 25, 1933.

== Reception ==
=== Box office ===
Hell Below earned theatrical rentals of $1,389,000: $634,000 from the US and Canada and $755,000 elsewhere, resulting in a loss of $52,000.

=== Critical response ===
Mordaunt Hall in his review of Hell Below for The New York Times, said: "... the way in which it slips from farcical doings ashore to grim sights aboard a damaged United States submersible are decidedly jarring. Yet, in spite of its obvious shortcomings, there are scenes in the undersea craft that are extremely well pictured and so are others depicting what happens on the surface of the water. But the rowdy mirth scarcely belongs to a narrative which includes sights of dying men in a submarine."
