= Mooncussers =

1962 Disney television movie

Mooncussers is a 1962 American TV film from Disney. It was originally released on TV in two parts but was released in some markets as a theatrical film, occasionally shown as part of a double bill with another Disney film.

It was based on the novel Flying Ebony by Iris Vinton.

== Plot ==
Pirates lure ships to destruction along the New England coast of the United States of America.

== Cast ==
- Kevin Corcoran as Jonathan Feather
- Oscar Homolka as Urias Hawke
- Lee Aaker as Willy
- Paul E. Burns as Mose
- Robert Burton as E.P. Hallett
- Robert Emhardt as Mr. Wick
- Joan Freeman as Betsy Feather
- Rian Garrick as Dan Hallett
- Ted Jacques as Bill Stacy
- Dayton Lummis as Commissioner
- Erin O'Brien-Moore as Mrs. Feather
- Tudor Owen as Skipper of Portland
- Dub Taylor as Fire Tender
- Eddy Waller as Captain Swain

== Production ==
Filming started April 16, 1962.
