= USS Williams (SP-498) =

Patrol vessel of the United States Navy

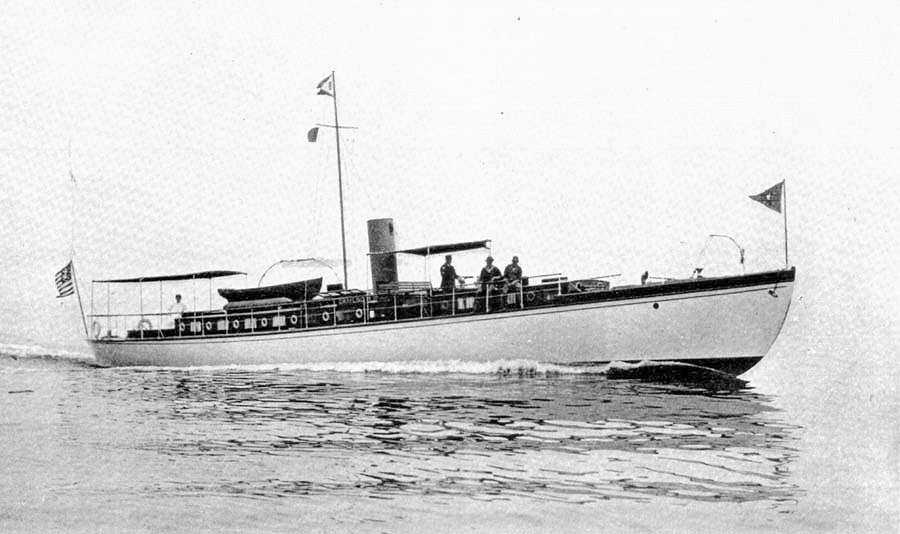
- Williams before World War I in private use as Grayling.

History

United States
- Name: USS Williams, later USS SP-498
- Namesake: Williams was her previous name retained; SP-498 was her section patrol number
- Builder: B. Frank Wood, City Island, The Bronx, New York
- Completed: 1907
- Acquired: 1918
- Commissioned: 16 March 1918
- Decommissioned: 18 December 1918
- Stricken: 18 December 1918
- Fate: Returned to owner 18 December 1918
- Notes: Operated as private yacht or motorboat, originally named Grayling, 1907-1918 and from December 1918

General characteristics
- Type: Patrol vessel
- Tonnage: 41 gross register tons
- Length: 90 ft 0 in (27.43 m)
- Beam: 12 ft 0 in (3.66 m)
- Draft: 5 ft (1.5 m)
- Depth: 6 ft (1.8 m)
- Propulsion: Steam engine or Internal combustion engine
- Speed: 15 knots
- Complement: 11
- Armament: 3 × 3-pounder guns; 2 × machine guns

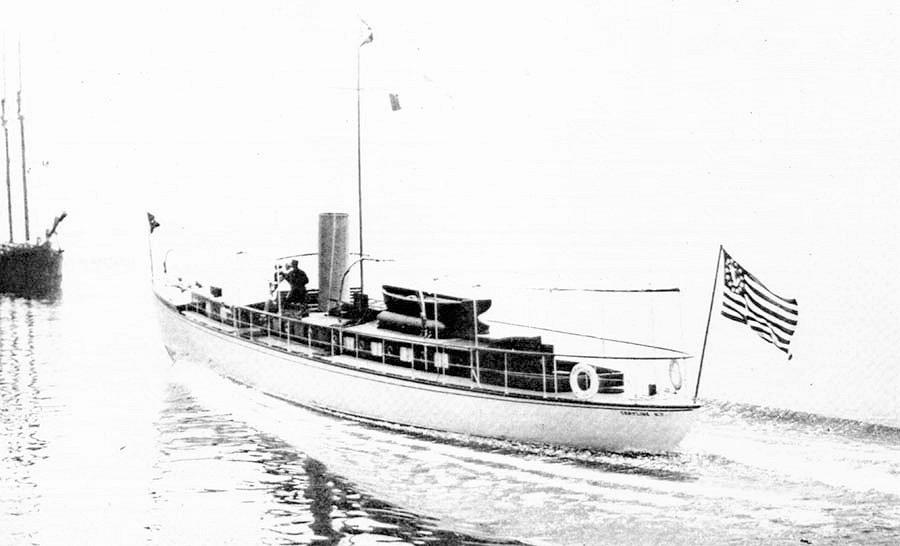
Williams before World War I in private use as Grayling.

The first USS Williams (SP-498), sometimes cited as USS Williams '18, later USS SP-498, was a United States Navy patrol vessel in commission from March to December 1918.

== Construction and acquisition ==
Williams was built as the private vessel Grayling - described by sources both as a wooden-hulled screw steam yacht and as a motorboat - in 1907 by B. Frank Wood at City Island, The Bronx, New York, for Justus Ruperti of New York City to a design by the firm of Tams, Lemoine, and Crane. Apparently she later was renamed Williams.

The U.S. Navy eventually acquired Williams for use as a section patrol vessel during World War I. She was commissioned at New York City as USS Williams (SP-498) on 16 March 1918.

== World War I operations ==
During her "unofficial trial trip" on 18 March 1918, Williams suffered a broken propeller shaft and was towed to the Philadelphia Marine Basin for repairs. One month later, while being taken in tow by the patrol yacht USS Aramis, Williams was jammed between Aramis and the pier, suffering damage again.

Apparently still without propulsion, Williams was towed to an offshore mooring and used for a month as a floating classroom by groups of hydrophone (or "listening tube") trainees, or "listeners." At the end of each day, she was towed back to port.

Drydocked in May 1918, Williams made a trial trip under her own power on 14 May 1918, her first time underway under her own power in nearly two months. On 28 May 1918, Williams's propeller struck the bottom while she was operating off Sandy Hook, New Jersey, and was damaged. She soon underwent repairs, after which she trained "listeners" using "listening tubes" for the remainder of the spring and summer of 1918. She suffered slight damage in collision with the salvage tug USS Relief on 27 September 1918.

At 1045 hours on 16 October 1918, Williams got underway quickly to come to the assistance of the sinking British steamer Port Phillip. She lay to off Port Phillip and presumably rendered assistance, although she did not enter her activities into her logbook.

On 17 October 1918, all listening gear was removed from Williams and stored and she was drydocked for repairs at the New York Navy Yard in Brooklyn, New York. She apparently remained at the shipyard through the end of World War I on 11 November 1918 and into December 1918.

At some point in 1918, Williams was renamed SP-498, presumably to avoid confusion with the new destroyer USS Williams, which was then under construction. The exact date of the name change is not available.

== Disposal ==
In the early part of December 1918, all armament, ammunition, and naval gear were removed from SP-498. She then proceeded to Shadyside, New Jersey, on 18 December 1918, where on that day she was simultaneously decommissioned, stricken from the Navy List, and returned to her owner.
