= USS Moody =

Clemson-class destroyer

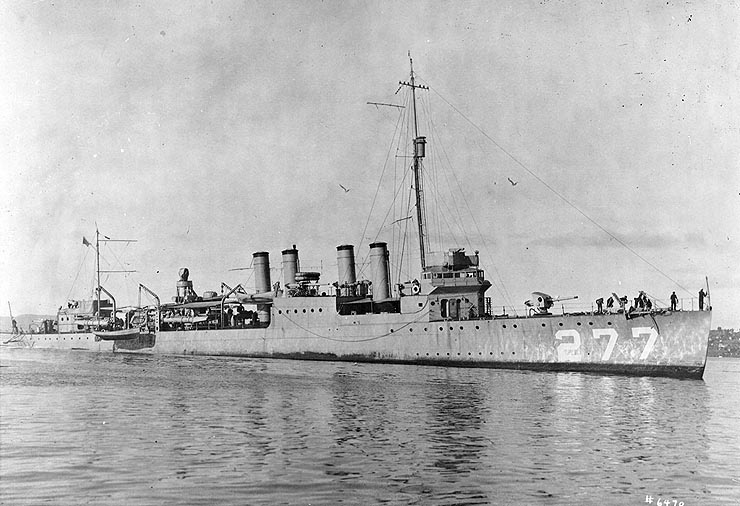
- USS Moody in port sometime between 1920 and 1922

History

United States
- Name: USS Moody
- Namesake: William Henry Moody
- Builder: Bethlehem Shipbuilding Corporation, Squantum Victory Yard, Quincy, Massachusetts
- Laid down: 9 December 1918
- Launched: 28 June 1919
- Commissioned: 10 December 1919
- Decommissioned: 15 June 1922
- Recommissioned: 27 September 1923
- Decommissioned: 2 June 1930
- Stricken: 3 November 1930
- Fate: Sold for scrap 10 June 1931; resold to Metro-Goldwyn-Mayer for use in the 1933 film Hell Below in which she was sunk 21 February 1933

General characteristics
- Class & type: Clemson-class destroyer
- Displacement: 1,308 tons
- Length: 314 ft 3 in (95.78 m)
- Beam: 30 ft 11 in (9.42 m)
- Draft: 9 ft 4 in (2.84 m)
- Propulsion: 26,500 shp (20 MW); geared turbines, 2 screws
- Speed: 35 knots (65 km/h)
- Range: 4,900 nmi (9,100 km); @ 15 kt
- Complement: 122 officers and enlisted
- Armament: 4 × 4 in (100 mm) guns, 1 × 3 in (76 mm) gun, 12 × 21 inch (533 mm) torpedo tubes

USS Moody (DD-277) was a Clemson-class destroyer in the United States Navy in commission from 1919 to 1922 and from 1923 to 1930. She was named for Secretary of the Navy (and future Supreme Court Justice) William Henry Moody.

== Construction and commissioning ==
Moody was laid down on 9 December 1918 at Squantum Victory Yard of the Bethlehem Shipbuilding Corporation at Quincy, Massachusetts, and launched on 28 June 1919. She was commissioned on 10 December 1919.

== Operational history ==
Assigned to the United States Pacific Fleet, Moody departed Boston, Massachusetts, on 9 February 1920, loaded torpedoes and ammunition at Newport, Rhode Island, and steamed via New York City, Guantanamo Bay, Cuba, and the Panama Canal to the United States West Coast, arriving at San Diego, California, on the 31st. She operated along the California coast through June 1920, and then departed San Francisco, California, on 1 July 1920 for Washington, where on 10 July 1920 she joined the cruise of United States Secretary of the Navy Josephus Daniels, United States Secretary of the Interior John B. Payne, and Admiral Hugh Rodman, Commander of the Pacific Fleet, to Alaska. On an inspection tour of Alaskan coal and oil fields and looking for possible fleet anchorages, the cruise touched at nine ports including Sitka and Juneau, and lasted for nearly a month. Moody returned to San Diego on 31 August 1920 to operate off the California coast in training and in battle exercises for two months. She put into San Diego on 10 October 1920, remaining there and decommissioning on 15 June 1922.

Moody recommissioned on 27 September 1923. Assigned to Destroyer Squadrons, Battle Fleet, the ship operated along the U.S. West Coast for the next 19 months, and then on 27 May 1925 departed Bremerton, Washington, for fleet exercises in the Hawaiian Islands. After operating from Pearl Harbor on Oahu and Lahaina Roads off Maui for a month, she departed Pearl Harbor on 1 July 1925 for the South Pacific Ocean, stopped at Pago Pago, American Samoa, and then made good will visits to Melbourne, Australia, and Dunedin and Wellington, New Zealand. Returning via Honolulu, Hawaii, to San Diego on 26 September 1925, Moody resumed operations along the U.S. West Coast operations into 1927, and made a voyage to Panama between February and April 1926.

On 17 February 1927, Moody departed San Diego for tactical maneuvers with the United States Fleet in the Caribbean. Proceeding through the Panama Canal on 4 March 1927, she arrived at Guantanamo Bay on 18 March 1927 and operated out of that port and Gonaïves, Haiti, on Fleet Problem VII, a naval exercise involving the defense of the Panama Canal, until 22 April 1927. She then proceeded to New York City for repairs. She departed New York City on 16 May 1927 and arrived at San Diego on 25 June 1927.

Moody remained in service with the Battle Fleet through mid-1929. From April to June 1928, she made another cruise to Hawaii with the fleet for the extensive exercises of Fleet Problem VIII, a naval exercise held between California and Hawaii. She steamed to Mexico and Panama in early 1929 and then in July 1929 cruised to the Pacific Northwest, traveling as far north as Ketchikan, Alaska.

== Fate ==
Moody decommissioned at San Diego on 2 June 1930 and was towed to Mare Island Navy Yard at Vallejo, California, arriving there on 8 June 1930. She was struck from the Naval Vessel Register on 3 November 1930 in accordance with naval arms limitations imposed under the London Naval Treaty.

Most of Moody′s superstructure was sold as scrap metal on 10 June 1931. The rest of the ship was sold to Metro-Goldwyn-Mayer for about US$35,000 for use in filming the 1933 World War I submarine movie Hell Below. The movie studio altered her appearance to resemble that of a World War I Austro-Hungarian Navy minelayer and hired the marine salvage and construction firm Merritt-Chapman & Scott to place charges of dynamite aboard her at carefully planned locations. Moody was towed to a point in the Pacific Ocean off San Pedro, California, and on the afternoon of 21 February 1933, the first charge was detonated, splitting Moody between two watertight compartments so she continued to float after breaking up. Then two other detonations breached the watertight bulkheads, sinking her later that evening. The explosions and sinkings were filmed for use in a scene in Hell Below depicting the sinking of an Austro-Hungarian minelayer by torpedoes from the fictional U.S. Navy submarine USS AL-14, portrayed in the movie by USS S-31 (SS-136).

The ship was rediscovered by local wreck divers in 1973.
