= Lipsett =

Lipsett is an Irish surname. It may be derived from the German or Jewish Lipschutz, or as a patronymic derived from the name Lippa, which in Old English referred to a talkative person. Its highest level of prevalence, which may or may not hint at where it first originated, is in Donegal.

== Notable people ==
Notable people with this surname include:

- Arthur Lipsett, Canadian director
- Francis Wesley Lipsett, Canadian veterinarian
- Genevieve Lipsett, Canadian journalist, teacher and suffragist
- Louis Lipsett, British Army officer
- Rhodanthe Lipsett, Australian midwife
- Rob Lipsett, contestant in Love Island (2015 TV series)
- Robert Lipsett, American violin teacher
- Ron Lipsett, Canadian politician
- Taylor Lipsett, American ice hockey player

== Fictional characters ==
Fictional characters with this surname include:

- Jo Lipsett, character in the Waterloo Road TV series

== See also ==
- Lipsett (disambiguation)
