= Merritt-Chapman & Scott =

American marine salvage and construction firm

- Type: Private
- Industry: Civil Engineering, Marine Engineering, Marine Construction, Salvage
- Founded: c. 1860
- Headquarters: New York City, New York
- Key people: Israel Merritt founder, Louis E. Wolfson corporate raider, Thomas A. Scott Jr. Manager
- Products: Projects

Merritt-Chapman & Scott, nicknamed "The Black Horse of the Sea", was a noted marine salvage and construction firm based in the United States, with worldwide operations. The chief predecessor company was founded in the 1860s by Israel Merritt, but a large number of other firms were merged over the course of the company's history. It was taken over in the 1950s by famed corporate raider Louis E. Wolfson. It went into liquidation in 1967.

== Early history ==
The 1850s and 1860s were a dangerous time for mariners and marine operations around the American continent. The transition from sail to steam with the consequent unreliability of equipment, and the growing needs of commerce to fuel US expansion meant that a large number of ships operated. Some foundered or got into trouble on their own, and some were lured to their doom by wreckers. Salvage operations were in their infancy, and commercial diving was almost unheard of. It was with this background that a number of companies started operating under law of the sea salvage rules rather than as wreckers. Israel Merritt founded Merritt Salvage in or before 1860 (Note: The exact starting year is not clear, but Mystic Seaport's catalog page, establishes 1860 as a date a predecessor with Merritt in the name existed. Some predecessors included: Coast Wrecking Company, Chapman Wrecking, Merritt's Wrecking Organization, and Merritt & Chapman Derrick & Wrecking Company.) to operate in this nascent industry.

The company continued to grow and expand the scope of operations, merging with other firms, and adopting the famous "black horse" house flag, a black horse in full gallop on a white flag. Iris Vinton, a noted author of young adult novels, wrote "Flying Ebony", a story about the origins of the Life Saving Benevolent Association of New York and the story behind the black horse shown on the corporate flag. "The memory of the black horse of this book is preserved as a symbol to this day on the house flag of Merritt-Chapman & Scott Corporation, the great ship salvage firm."

In addition to salvage operations, the company got involved in marine construction, acquiring a number of boats, and steam derricks. (Note: From the Mystic Seaport records: The following vessels are associated in this library's records. Not all are necessarily owned by MC&S or predecessors, further research would be needed: CHILEAN (Steamer); CITY OF NEW YORK (Steamer); FRANCISCA (Steamer); GODREVY (Steamer); HAROLD (Steamer); HENRY A. LITCHFIELD (Bark); JONES (Tug); LORNTY (Steamer); M. D. S. (Schooner); MERRITT (Tug); NANKIN (Steamer); POLARIA (Steamship); RESCUE (Steamer); SAN JACINTO (Steamer); TALLAPOOSA (U.S.S.))

By the late 19th century, the firm had some experience in maritime investigation, with the ability to determine causes for wrecks and explosions. When, in 1898, the USS Maine exploded in the harbour of Havana, Cuba, the U.S. War department engaged Merritt-Chapman to determine whether the unknown explosion came from inside the hull or outside. Investigators decided that it was external, and attributed it to blast powder. This incident became the precipitate cause of the Spanish–American War.

Salvage Tug Relief prior to 1918 sale to US Navy (note black horse "house flag" on stack)

In 1909, the RMS Republic was struck by the SS Florida, and sank in 40 fathoms of open ocean off Nantucket, Massachusetts the next day after unsuccessful towing attempts by the MC&S Relief and other tugs, taking a rumoured 3 million in gold currency with her. Merritt-Chapman were engaged to evaluate salvage operations and whether it would be possible to raise her, or to carry out a diving salvage. It was their conclusion that operations were not possible, and the New York papers all reported the view as definitive, demonstrating that MC&S already had considerable reputation for expertise in maritime salvage.

== Expansion into construction ==
It is not clear from the sources consulted so far what sorts of activities MC&S were involved in during the 1910s although some ships were sold to the Navy just prior to US entry into World War I in 1917, including the Relief and subsequently purchased back after the war's end.

In the 1920s, it is known they continued to be involved in diving operations (Note: An illustration of divers in hardhat helmets aboard a MS&C vessel found at LostLabor.com was taken in 1929 for the vanity press book Merritt-Chapman & Scott Corporation: Black Horse of the Sea written by Robert D. MacMillan and self-published in New York (p. 28).) and they had a reputation of "skilled artisans with an average individual experience probably not to be found in any other group".

== The 1930s ==
By the 1930s MS&C's broadening of scope was clear. They continued to acquire companies and were involved in a large number of construction projects during this decade that utilised their underwater, pile driving, concrete setting, foundation construction, and diving expertise. These projects included the Waldo-Hancock Bridge (1931) in Bucksport, Maine, the Marquette Ore Docks (1931) in Marquette, Michigan, and the Mount Vernon Memorial Highway Hunting Creek Bridge (1932) in Alexandria, Virginia. and even sinking an elderly destroyer (USS Moody) for the 1933 MGM film Hell Below.

=== Ore dock project in Marquette ===
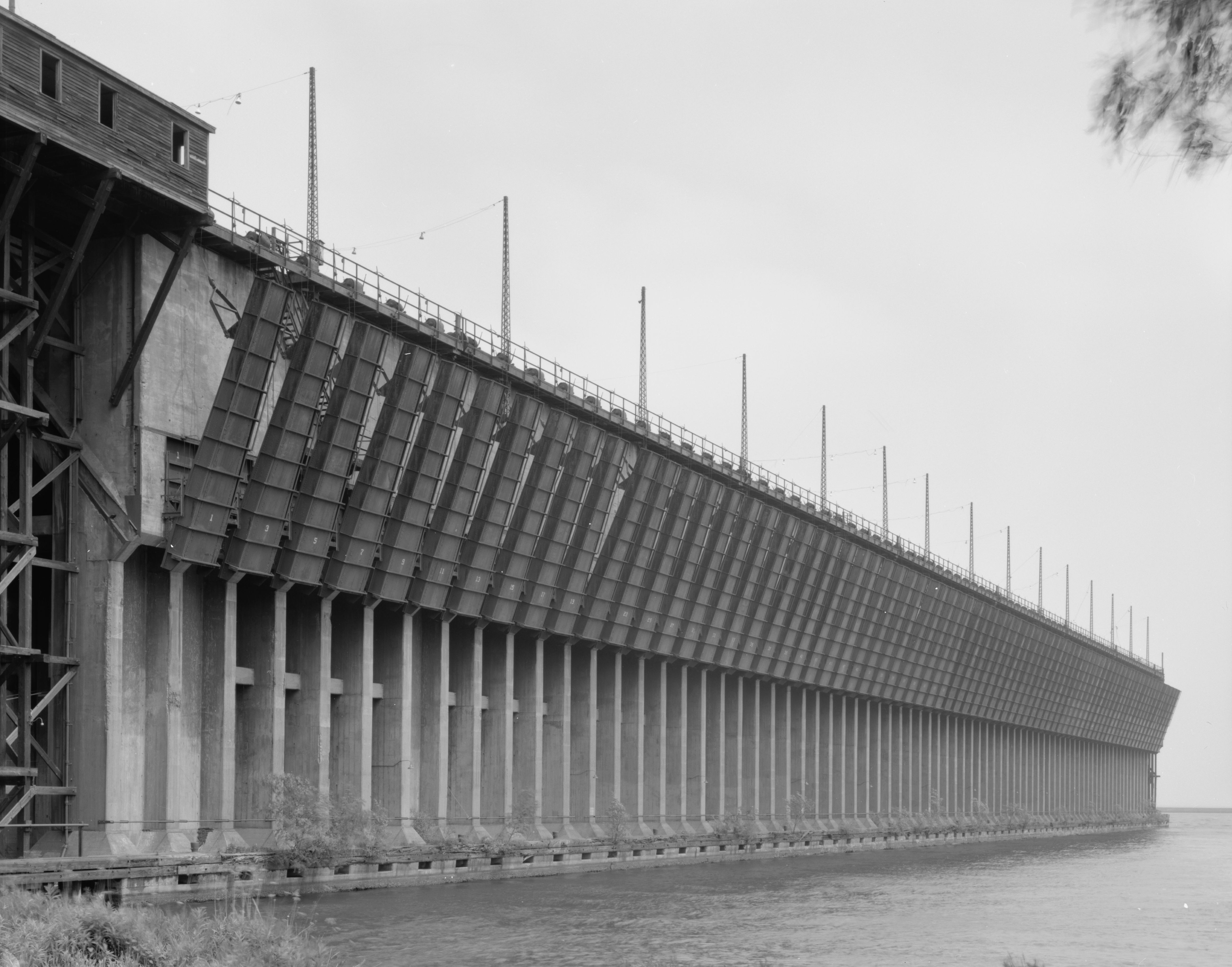
Marquette Ore Dock, 1931

Marquette had been an ore transshipment (from rail to ship for a journey down Lake Superior and the rest of the Great Lakes to either Chicago, Detroit or Cleveland where the mills were) point since the 1850s, with a succession of more elaborate ore storage and transfer facilities being constructed. The Duluth, South Shore and Atlantic Railway (DSS&A) commissioned the construction of a large and modern facility in 1931.

The construction process began with the awarding of contracts. The first one was awarded in March 1931 when the Lake Shore Engine Works of Marquette was contracted to construct 150 hoists for raising and lowering the dock chutes. The second contract was let out on April 1, to the Merritt-Chapman & Whitney Corporation of Duluth. This company was the successor to Whitney Bros. which specialized in the building of docks, bridges, heavy construction work of all kinds as well as river and harbor improvements. They would bring their experience to this project. The fabricated steel for the dock including the large steel ore chutes would be furnished by McClintick, Marshall Corporation of Chicago. Jernstad Electric of Ishpeming would install the electrical work and the Worden—Allen Company of Chicago was given the contract for furnishing all of the reinforced steel for the dock and its approach.

=== Sinking of the Moody ===
The USS Moody, a World War I vintage destroyer, obsolete, and over the London Naval Treaty limits for naval vessels, was headed for the breaking yard when MGM purchased her for approximately US$35,000 to film Hell Below, a movie based on Commander Edward Ellsberg's novel Pigboats, which starred Robert Montgomery and Jimmy Durante.

Corporate ad, 1938

The Moody was towed from Mare Island to a nearby shipyard and reworked to resemble an Austro-Hungarian destroyer. To simulate her sinking by "torpedoes" by the American submarine, AL-14 (played by sub S-31), Merritt-Chapman & Scott Corporation were hired. A charge of dynamite was placed on board just aft of the bridge. Shortly after noon on February 21, 1933, the Moody was blown in two. The explosion was placed between two water tight compartments so she would continue to float after the explosion. Two other explosions took out the water tight bulkheads and the Moody finally sank at 5:30 PM. Several boats, many with newsmen aboard hoping to film the sinking destroyer, hovered around the film crew interfering with operations. Threats were exchanged, but the filming was done.

== The 1940s ==
As during World War I there was a fair bit of transference of MC&S assets to the Navy, and back again, as a result of World War II. One of the most famous salvage operations ever carried out by MC&S was the salvage of the Normandie, a French liner, the largest in the world when built, which was seized by the US after the fall of France.

By 1941 the United States Navy decided to convert the Normandie into a troopship, the aptly named USS Lafayette. The ship was moored at Manhattan's Pier 88 for the conversion. On February 9, 1942, sparks from a welding torch ignited a stack of thousands of lifevests filled with kapok, a highly flammable material, that had been stored in the first class dining room. The woodwork had not yet been removed, and the fire spread rapidly. The ship had a very efficient fire protection system, but it had been disconnected during the conversion. All on board fled the ship. As firefighters on shore and in fireboats poured water on the blaze, the ship developed a dangerous list to port. About 2:45 a.m. on February 10, the Normandie capsized, crushing a fireboat. A shot of the capsized ship makes a brief cameo appearance towards the end of Alfred Hitchcock's film Saboteur.

The ship was righted in 1943 by Merritt-Scott & Chapman in the world's most expensive salvage operation, but it was subsequently determined that the cost of restoring the liner was too great. After neither the US Navy nor the French Line offered to restore the liner, the ship's designer, Vladimir Yourkevitch, made a last-ditch proposal to cut the ship down and restore her as a mid-sized passenger liner. This, too, failed to draw backing, and the former Normandie was sold to Lipsett Inc. and scrapped in 1947.

Another notable project was construction in 1942 of the Escanaba Ore Docks, Escanaba, Michigan, which were built as a backup in case the Marquette docks were sabotaged or bombed.

- Hospital Universitario UCV 1943 Caracas, Venezuela.

== The 1950s ==
MC&S acquired the New York Shipbuilding company at some point during the 1950s or 1960s (a 1949 book gives no mention of MS&C ownership. Further research is needed to clarify this part of the history.

MC&S itself was to be taken over in 1951 by Louis E. Wolfson a renowned corporate raider of the time. The takeover was not without its problems, there were a number of stockholder suits, and eventually, further difficulties.

But Merritt-Chapman & Scott was involved in a large number of projects during this decade, including the following:

- Washburn Tunnel, 1950,
- Delaware Memorial Bridge 1951
- John Greenleaf Whittier Bridge 1951
- Auckland Harbour Board Freyberg and import wharf (joint venture with Fletcher Construction & Raymond Concrete Pile) 1951 Auckland
- Tasman Mill 1953 New Zealand
- Kingston-Rhinecliff Bridge 1957 Kingston, New York
- Walt Whitman Bridge 1957

=== Mackinac Bridge ===
One of the most important projects of the decade was the foundation contract for David B. Steinman's Mackinac Bridge commenced 1954 and completed in 1957, across the Straits of Mackinac. This five-mile (8.0 km) bridge (including approaches) was the world's longest anchorage-to-anchorage single-suspended span at the time. and Merritt-Chapman & Scott Corporation's $25,735,600 (equivalent to $238 million in 2024) contract to build all the foundations led to the mobilization of the largest bridge construction fleet ever assembled to the time. The American Bridge Division of United States Steel Corporation had a $44,532,900 (equivalent to $411 million in 2024) contract to build this superstructure, with steel supplied by U.S. Steel's mills and delivered via their Pittsburgh Steamship Division's fleet.

== The 1960s ==
Since the takeover, Wolfson had been stung with a dozen suits by angry investors, and in 1966 was indicted by a federal grand jury on charges of fraudulent dealings in Merritt-Chapman stock. Such stock manipulations, if they occurred, are only one of Merritt-Chapman's misfortunes under Wolfson. Another is that he tried to build up and broaden the company too fast. Acquisitions such as the unprofitable New York Shipbuilding Corp cut into profits and dividends; in 1966, there was a loss of $740,000 and no dividend at all. To halt the drain, Wolfson sold off a paint company, a small steel mill, the company's derrick division and a small shipyard, but the future was not assured. Along with its losses on operations, Merritt-Chapman also added a $3,233,000 "special charge" to the books in 1967 as a provision against losses if other properties had to be sold.

However, the company did carry out significant projects in this, the last full decade of its life. These included:

- Throgs Neck Bridge 1961 New York City
- Guri Dam 1963 Puerto Ordaz, Venezuela - as partner.
- Glen Canyon Dam Arizona
- Talmadge Bridge 1953–1954 Savannah, Georgia
- Chesapeake Bay Bridge-Tunnel 1964 Hampton Roads
- New Jersey Turnpike

The company also undertook smaller projects ranging from roads in Ethiopia to Air Force early-warning stations in Labrador.

== Dissolution ==
The company went into liquidation in 1967. The management aimed to complete the liquidation process in three years, but it was not in fact completed until 1982.

Since 1971, the New York Ship site has been owned by the South Jersey Port Corporation, a state agency, and operated as the Broadway Street Terminal. The Destroyer Yard was replaced in the 1960s by the Kitty Hawk drydock. That drydock is now the 850-foot (260 m) principal berth for the Broadway Terminal, and is used for general cargo including petroleum coke, coal, dolomite, steel products, wood products, minerals, cocoa beans and perishables.
