= Underway replenishment =

Type of ship-to-ship transfer

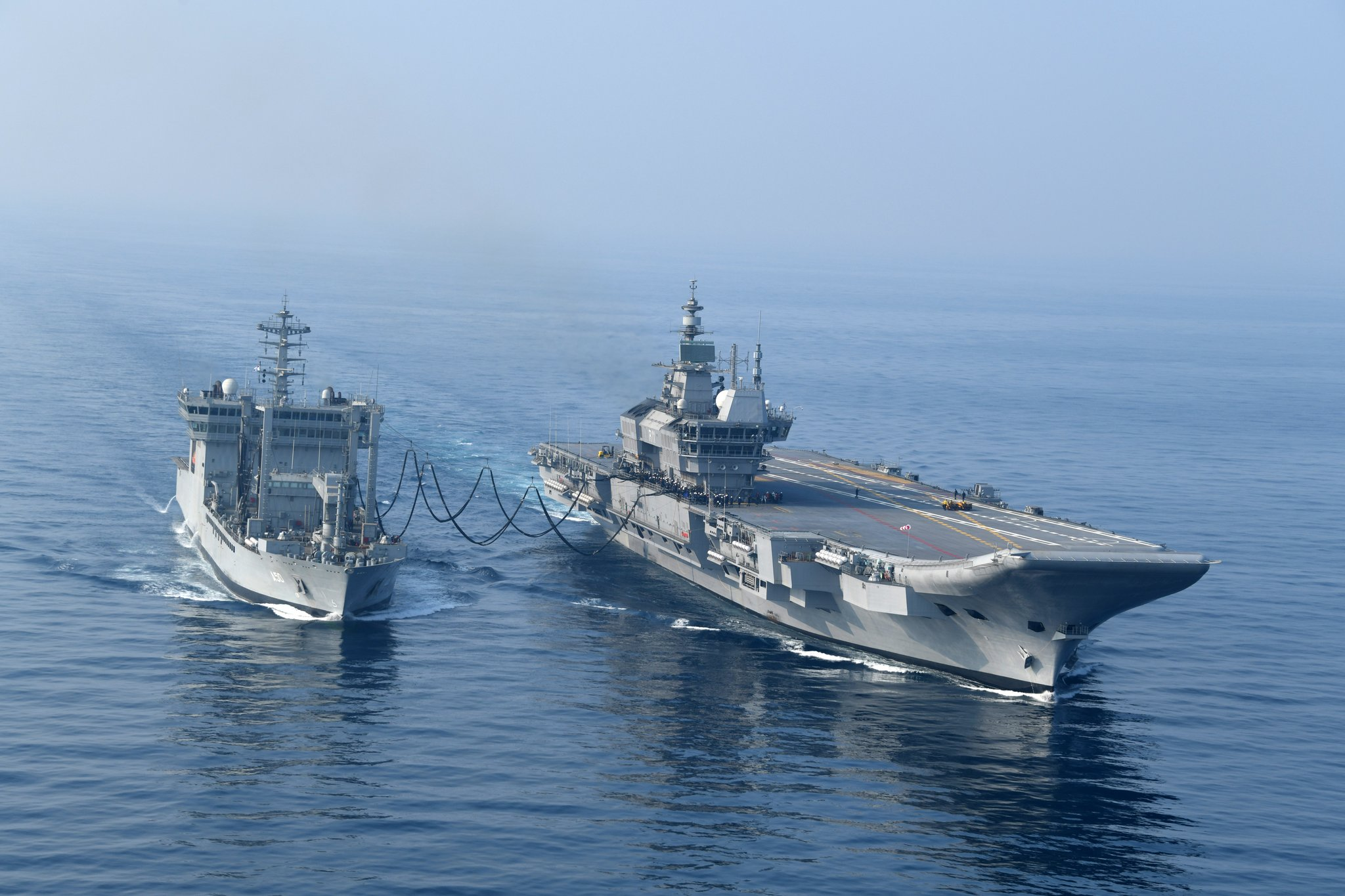
INS Deepak (left) conducts a replenishment at sea with INS Vikrant.

Underway replenishment (UNREP; U.S. Navy) or replenishment at sea (RAS; North Atlantic Treaty Organization/Commonwealth of Nations) is a method of transferring fuel, munitions, and stores from one ship to another while under way. First developed in the early 20th century, it was used extensively by the United States Navy as a logistics support technique in the Pacific theatre of World War II, permitting U.S. carrier task forces to remain at sea indefinitely.

== History ==
=== Concept ===
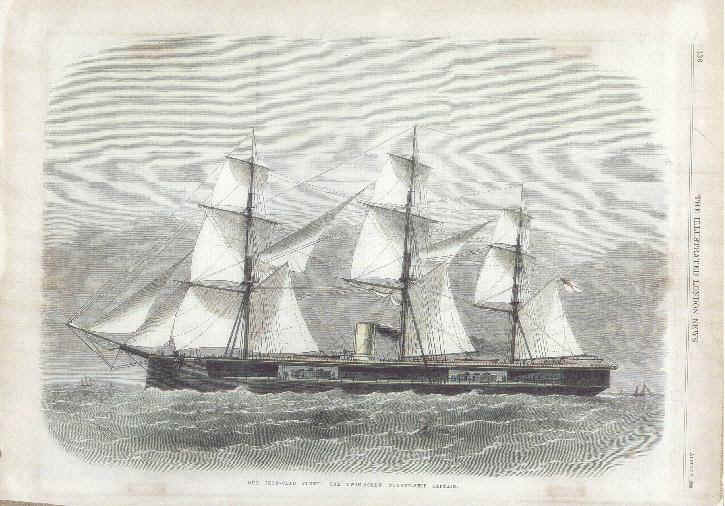
Early ship resupplying at sea, such as an attempt with HMS Captain in 1870, was slow and often hazardous.

Prior to underway replenishment, coaling stations were the only way to refuel ships far from home. The Royal Navy had an unparalleled global logistics network of coaling stations and the world's largest collier fleet. This capability allowed the Navy to project naval power around the world and far from home ports. This had two disadvantages: the infrastructure was vulnerable to disruption or attack, and its use introduced a predictable pattern to naval operations that an enemy could exploit.

Early attempts at refueling and restocking at sea had been made as early as 1870, when HMS Captain of the Channel Squadron was resupplied with coal at a rate of five tons per hour. The speed was too slow to be practicable, and calm weather was required to keep the neighbouring ships together.

Lieutenant Robert Lowry was the first to suggest the use of large-scale underway replenishment techniques in an 1883 paper to the Royal United Services Institute. He argued that a successful system would provide a minimum rate of 20 tons per hour while the ships maintain a speed of five knots. His proposal was for transfer to be effected through watertight coal carriers suspended from a cable between the two ships.

Although his concept was rejected by the Admiralty, the advantages of such a system were made apparent to strategists on both sides of the Atlantic. Over 20 submissions were made to the Royal Navy between 1888 and 1890 alone.

=== First trials ===
Schematic for a Temperley transporter, a crane for hauling heavy loads, used in early underway replenishment trials in 1898

The main technical problem was ensuring a constant distance between the two ships throughout the process. According to a report from The Times, a French collier had been able to provision two warships with 200 tons of coal at a speed of six knots using a Temperley transporter in 1898.

The United States Navy also became interested in the potential of underway replenishment. Lacking a similar collier fleet and network of coaling stations, and embarking on a large naval expansion, the Navy began conducting experiments in 1899 with a system devised by Spencer Miller and the Lidgerwood Manufacturing Company of New York. His device kept a cable suspended between the two ships taut, with a quick-release hook that could travel up and down the line with the use of a winch. The first test of the device involved the collier Marcellus and battleship Massachusetts.

The Royal Navy embarked on more extensive trials in 1901, and achieved a rate of 19 tons per hour. To meet the requirement for a rate of at least 40 tons per hour, Miller implemented a series of improvements, such as improving the maintenance of tension of the cable, allowing heavier loads to be supported.

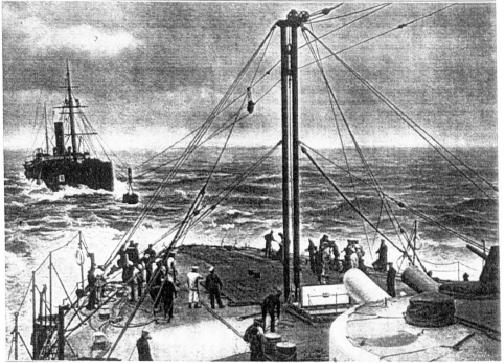
Trials of the Metcalfe system in 1902 between the battleship HMS Trafalgar and collier

Miller also collaborated with the British Temperley Company, producing an enhanced version, known as the Temperley-Miller system. Royal Navy trials with this new system in 1902 achieved an unprecedented average rate of 47 tons per hour and a peak rate of 60 tons per hour. The Thames Ironworks and Shipbuilding Company also patented its "Express equipment", which delivered supplies to the broadside of the ship, instead of from the aft. The company offered the system to the Admiralty, claiming that it had achieved a rate of 150 tons per hour, but the offer was declined.

A Royal Navy engineer, Metcalf, suggested an alternative system in 1903, where two cables were used, and the cable tension was maintained with the use of a steam ram. Trials were held in 1903, which demonstrated an optimal operating speed of 10 knots with a transfer rate of 54 tph. Although it was a superior system and met with a formal endorsement from the Admiralty there is little evidence that such equipment was employed by any navy. In May 1905, the U.S. Navy tested an improved Miller-Lidgerwood rig using the Marcellus and the battleship Illinois near Cape Henry. These coaling tests achieved 35 tph while steaming at seven knots, which fell short of expectations.

None of these coal systems approached the transfer rates required to make RAS practicable, considering that a battleship required over 2000 tons and a small destroyer required 200. As a result, it could take 60 hours or more to refuel a battleship, with both vessels steaming at five knots, during which time both were vulnerable to attack.

=== Trials with oil ===
With the transition to oil as the main fuel for ships at sea, underway replenishment became practicable since liquid could be continuously pumped posing fewer problems than the transfer of solids.

In January 1906 the Royal Navy conducted experiments with transfers between the oiler Petroleum and the battleship Victorious. The oiler was towed 600 ft (180 m) astern of Victorious using a 6.5 in (170 mm) steel rope. Twenty-seven lengths of 20 ft (6.1 m) long hose were then connected between the ships. Experiments were undertaken with both bronze and steel hose attached to a three-inch wire jackstay, with another wire used as a traveling jackstay for the hose. As the Victorious was coal-fired, water instead of oil was pumped between the two vessels. The trial found that a transfer rate of 115 tons per hour could be achieved with the vessels traveling at speeds up to 12 knots in fine weather. The trial found that it took five hours to pass the hoses from the Petroleum to the Victorious, including a one-hour meal break, with it taking three hours to return the hoses to the oiler. The trial found that the oiler's replenishment mechanism had a tendency to break due to the high pumping pressures required.

As a result of this trial the oiler Burma, which was launched in 1911, was the first oiler to be constructed to the order of the Admiralty and was designed for supplying destroyers with oil at sea as well as from alongside when in harbour. In August and September 1911, the Burma carried out refueling at sea trials at Portland with the destroyers HMS Mohawk, when 117 tons were transferred, with HMS Swift, when 270 tons were transferred, and with HMS Amazon, when 105 tons were transferred. Astern refuelling was again employed, this time utilizing a hose which ran on wooden rollers suspended in stirrups from a jackstay. A later improvement was the use of a buoyant rubber hose, which trailed in the sea between the two ships. Despite proving the concept viable, the C-in-C Home Fleet reported that "the use of tanker vessels for oiling destroyers at sea was unlikely to be of service and that further trials were unnecessary". As a result, the Royal Navy preferred to continue to use fuelling alongside in harbour, rather than at sea until World War II.

=== Operational use ===
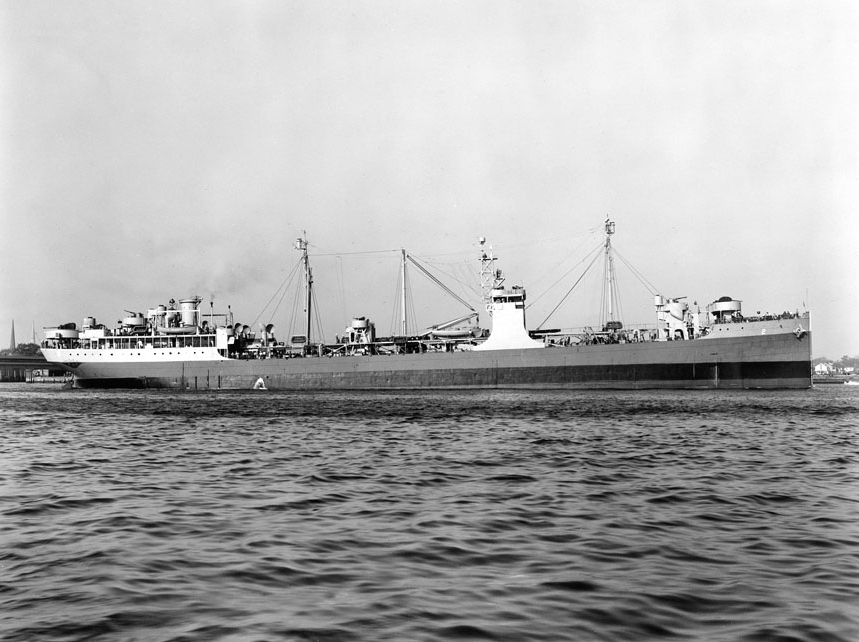
The oiler USS Maumee achieved the first operational UR in 1917.

In 1916, Chester Nimitz, executive officer and chief engineer of the United States Navy oiler USS Maumee, designed and jerry-rigged a riding-abeam refueling system while the ship was stationed in Cuba, with the assistance of G. B. Davis, Matt Higgins and Lieutenant F. M. Perkins. The system had ship booms supporting rubber hoses between the oiler and the receiving destroyer. The system employed a 10 in (254 mm) towing hawser, two 6 in (150 mm) breast lines to prevent the rupture of the refueling hose between the two vessels, and 50 ft (15 m) lengths of 4 in (100 mm) rubber fuel hose. A pump was used to speed up the transfer of fuel.

Following the declaration of war, 6 April 1917, USS Maumee was assigned duty refueling at sea the destroyers being sent to Britain. Stationed about 300 miles south of Greenland, Maumee was ready for the second group of six U.S. ships to be sent as they closed on her on 28 May 1917. Following this first deployment, she transferred fuel to 34 destroyers over the course of a three-month period. These fuel transfers were made with only a 40 ft (12 m) separation between the moving ships. With the fueling of those destroyers, Maumee pioneered the Navy's underway refueling operations, thus establishing a pattern of mobile logistic support which would enable the Navy to keep its fleets at sea for extended periods, with a far greater range independent of the use of a friendly port.

While during the interwar period most navies pursued the refueling of destroyers and other small vessels by either the alongside or astern method, it was the conventional wisdom that larger warships could neither be effectively refueled astern nor safely refueled alongside, until a series of tests conducted by now-Rear Admiral Nimitz in 1939–40 perfected the rigs and shiphandling which made the refueling of any size vessel practicable.

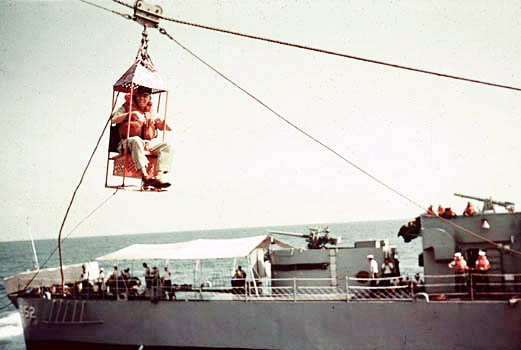
Personnel transferred from USS Rankin by highline, 1960

This was used extensively as a logistics support technique in the Pacific theatre of World War II, permitting U.S. carrier task forces to remain at sea indefinitely. Since it allowed extended range and striking capability to naval task forces the technique was classified so that enemy nations could not duplicate it.

In the 1950s and 1960s the U.S. Navy developed a multi-product supply ship that could deliver fuel, ammunition and stores while underway. These ships saw the introduction of a transfer system using a ram tensioner that keeps the highline between the ships tensioned, allowing for smooth transfer, as well as taking into account any movement of the ships. Over time this method evolved into the Standard Tensioned Replenishment Alongside Method (STREAM). The U.S. Navy also uses the spanwire rig, bye close-in rig, and spanline rig to transfer. The STREAM rig is preferred over other connected replenishment methods as it permits a greater separation between the ships.

Germany used specialized submarines (so-called milk-cows) to supply hunter U-boats in the Atlantic during WWII. These were relatively ponderous. They required both submarines to be stationary on the surface, took a long time to transfer stores, and needed to be in radio contact with the replenished boat, making them easy targets. Due to this, those not sunk were soon retired from their supply role.

Although time and effort has been invested in perfecting underway replenishment procedures, they are still hazardous operations.

Presently, most underway replenishments for the U.S. Navy are handled by the Military Sealift Command. It is now used by most, if not all, blue-water navies.

== Methods ==
There are several methods of performing an underway replenishment.

=== Alongside connected replenishment ===
Drawing showing probe arriving at bell-mouth, used for liquid transfers

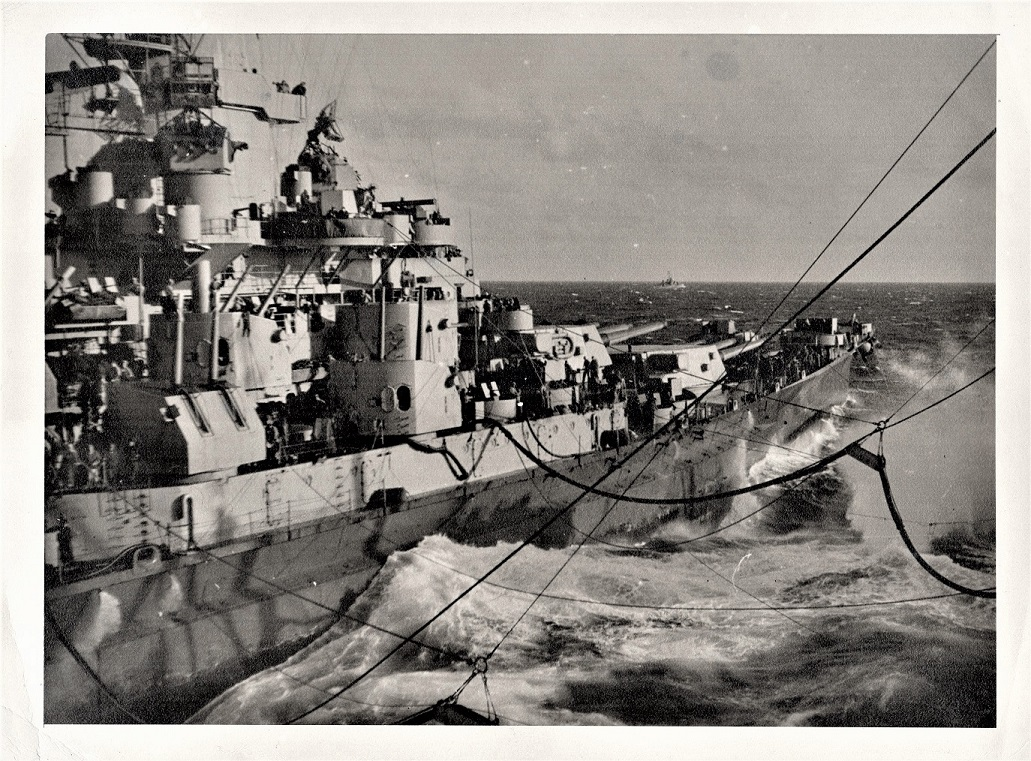
Close-in fueling between a U.S. battleship traveling at 12 knots and an oiler (out of frame, on the right). Battle of Okinawa, April–June 1945.

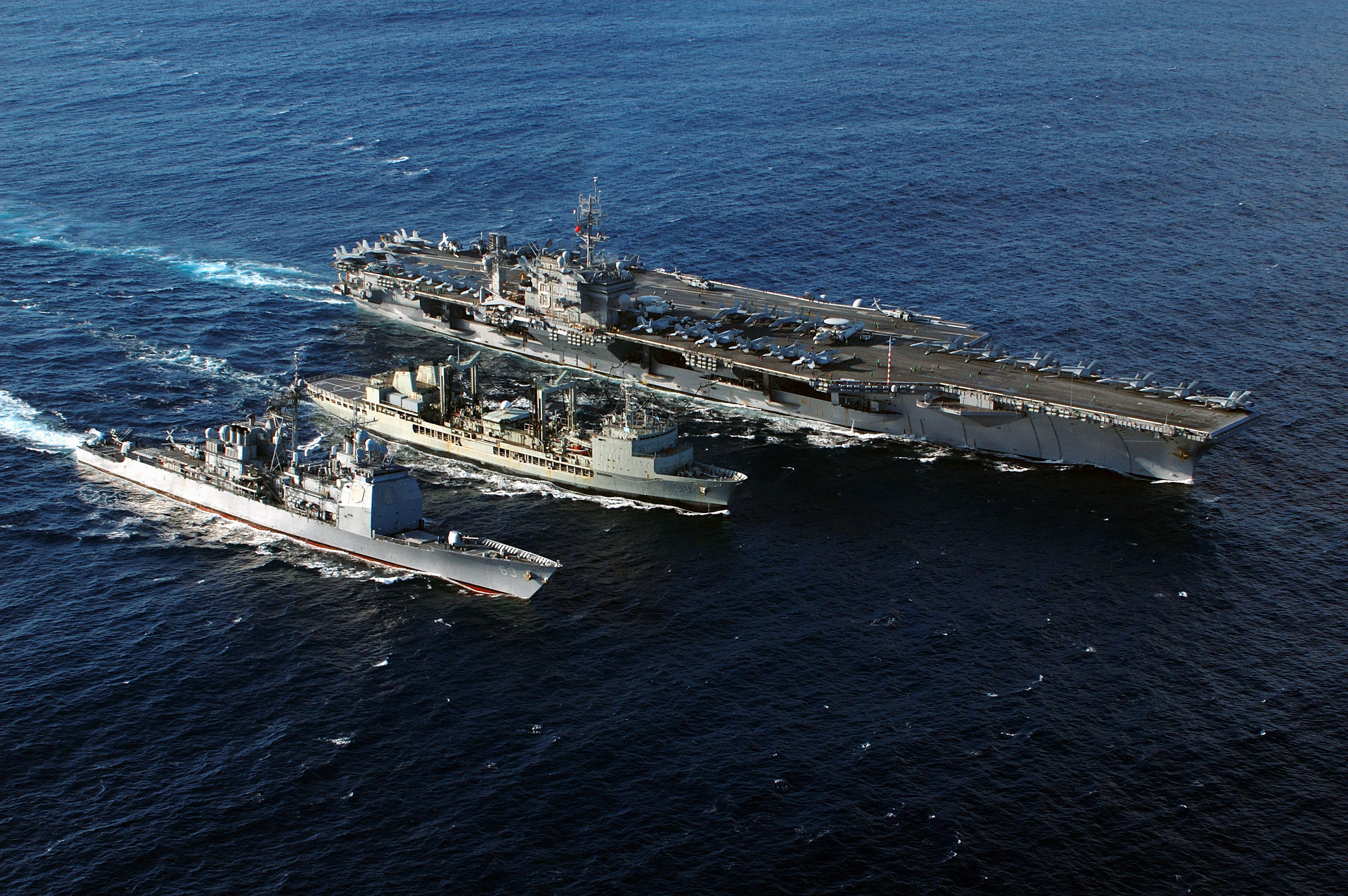
The Royal Australian Navy replenishment vessel HMAS Success conducting a double underway replenishment with USS Kitty Hawk and USS Cowpens, 2005

The alongside connected replenishment (CONREP) is a standard method of transferring liquids such as fuel and fresh water, along with ammunition and break bulk goods.

In the 1950s and 1960s the U.S. Navy developed a multi-product supply ship that could deliver fuel, ammunition and stores while underway. These ships saw the introduction of a transfer system using a ram tensioner that keeps the highline between the ships tensioned, allowing for smooth transfer, as well as taking into account any movement of the ships in the water. Over time this method evolved into the Standard Tensioned Replenishment Alongside Method (STREAM). The STREAM rig is preferred over other connected replenishment methods as it permits a greater separation between the ships.

The supplying ship holds a steady course and speed, generally between 12 and 16 knots. Moving at speed lessens relative motion due to wave action and allows better control of heading. The receiving ship then comes alongside the supplier at a distance of approximately 60-80 yards. A gunline, pneumatic line thrower, or shot line is fired from the supplier, which is used to pull across a messenger line. This line is used to pull across other equipment such as a distance line, phone line, and the transfer rig lines. As the command ship of the replenishment operation, the supply ship provides all lines and equipment needed for the transfer. Additionally, all commands are directed from the supply ship.

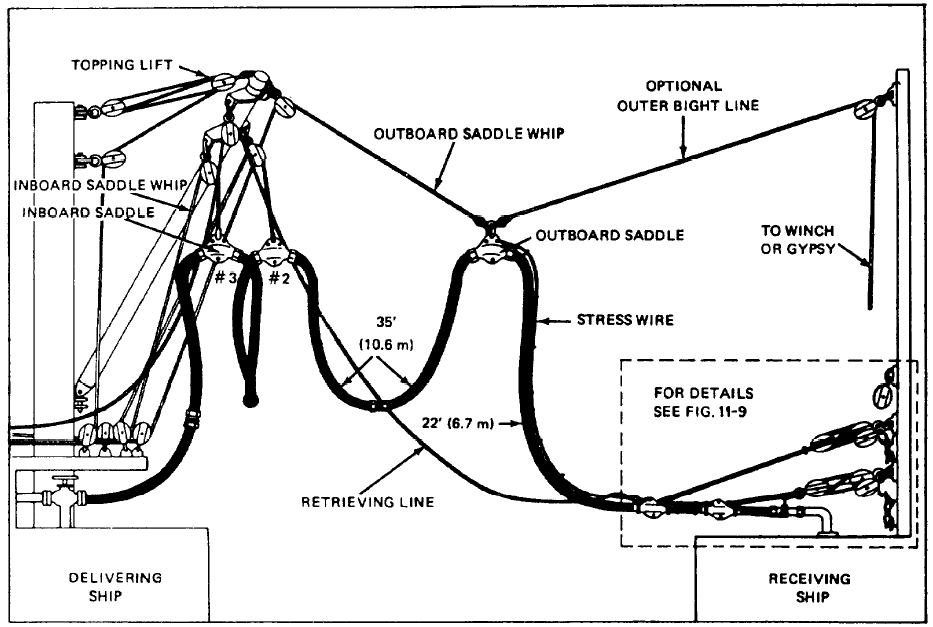
Close-in fueling rig as used through World War II

Because of the relative position of the ships, it is usual for larger ships to set up multiple transfer rigs, allowing for faster transfer or the transfer of multiple types of stores. Additionally, nearly all replenishment ships are set up to service two receivers at one time, with one being replenished on each side.

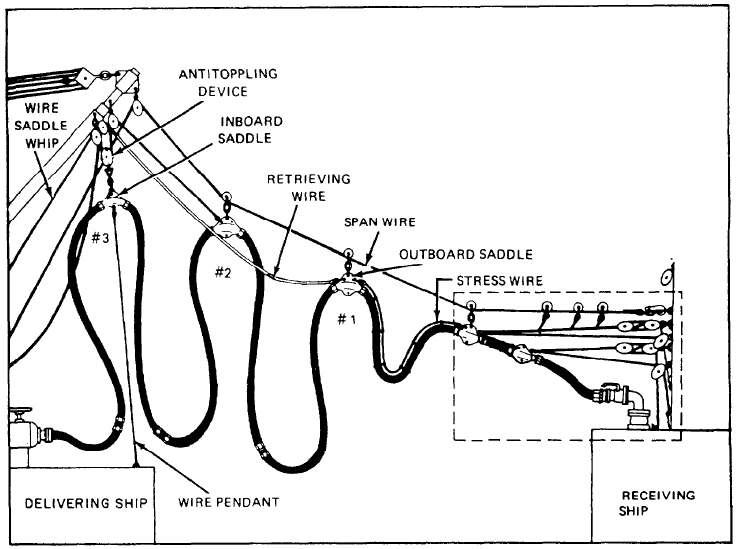
Span-wire fueling rig as used since 1945

Most ships can receive replenishment on either side. Aircraft carriers of the U.S. Navy, however, always receive replenishment on the starboard side of the carrier. The design of an aircraft carrier, with its island/navigation bridge to starboard, does not permit replenishment to the carrier's port side.

Alongside connected replenishment is a risky operation, as two or three ships running side by side at speed must hold to precisely the same course and speed for a long period of time. Moreover, the hydrodynamics of two ships running close together cause a suction between them. A slight steering error on the part of one of the ships could cause a collision, or part the transfer lines and fuel hoses. At a speed of 12 knots, a 1-degree variation in heading will produce a lateral speed of around 20 feet per minute. For this reason, experienced and qualified helmsmen are required during the replenishment, and the crew on the bridge must give their undivided attention to the ship's course and speed. The risk is increased when a replenishment ship is servicing two ships at once.

Because of the risks involved crews practice emergency breakaway procedures, where the ships will separate in less-than-optimal situations. Although the ships will be saved from collision, it is possible to lose stores, as the ships may not be able to finish the current transfer.

Following successful completion of replenishment, many U.S. ships engage in the custom of playing breakaway music, a signature tune broadcast over the replenished vessel's PA system as they separate from the supplying vessel. In the Royal Australian Navy it is customary for ships to fly a special flag during the RAS operation, distinctive to each ship. As many ships are named for Australian towns and cities, it is often the case that they fly flags of AFL, NRL or A-League teams associated with that town or city. The flying of flags popularising brands of beer or other alcoholic beverages is also not uncommon.

=== Astern fueling ===
The earliest type of replenishment, rarely used today, is astern fueling. In this method, the receiving ship follows directly behind the supplying ship. The fuel-supplying ship throws a marker buoy into the sea and the receiving ship takes station with it. Then the delivering ship trails a hose in the water that the fuel-receiving ship retrieves and connects to. This method is more limited, as only one transfer rig can be set up. However, it is safer, as a slight course error will not cause a collision. U.S. Navy experiments with Cuyama and Kanawha led the Navy to conclude that the rate of fuel transfer was too slow to be useful. But the astern method of refuelling was used by the German and Japanese Navies during World War II; and this method was still used by the Soviet navy for many decades thereafter.

=== Vertical replenishment ===
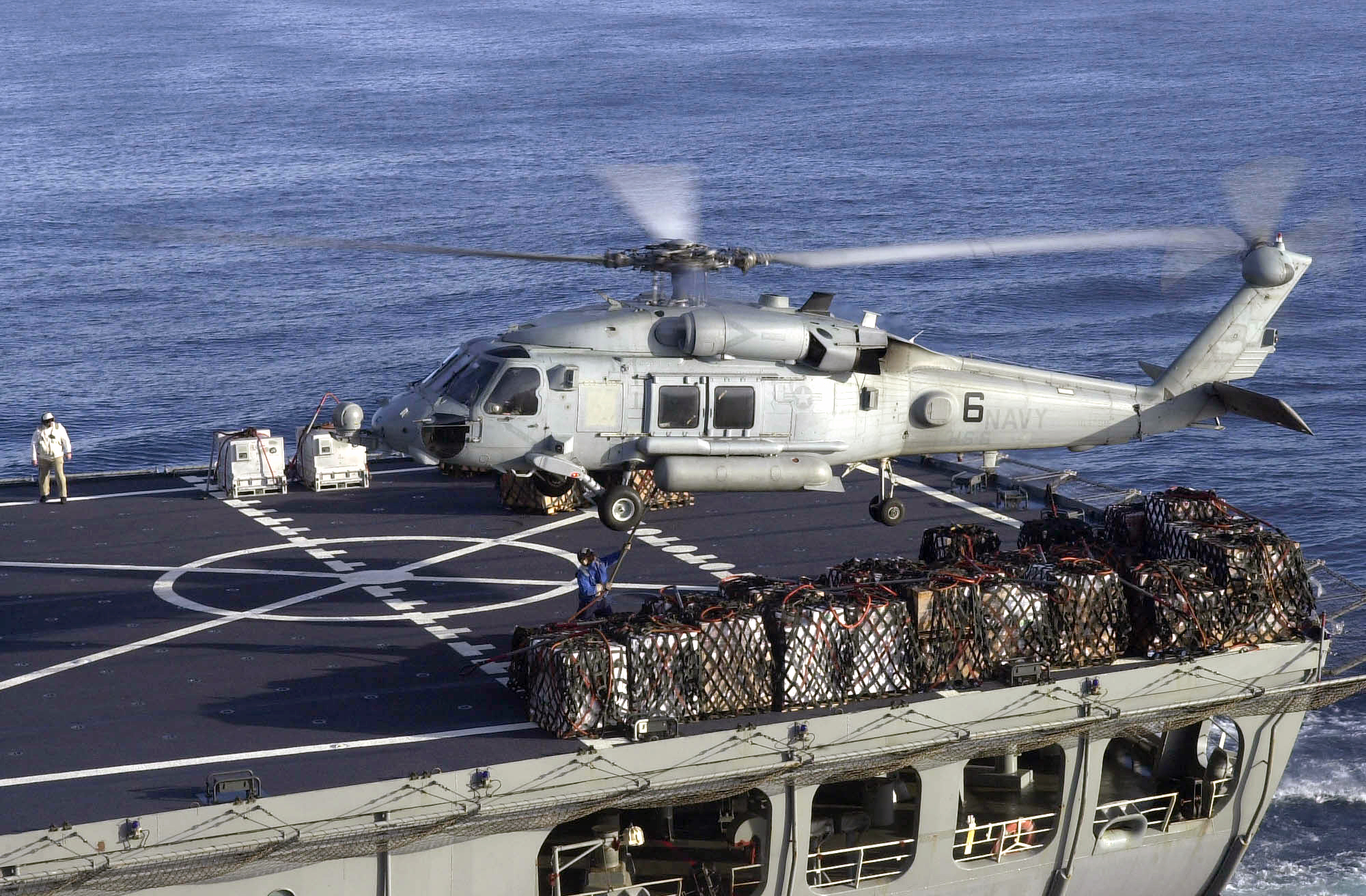
An SH-60 Sea Hawk transferring stores between ships, 2003

A third type of underway replenishment is vertical replenishment (VERTREP). In this method, a helicopter lifts cargo from the supplying ship and lowers it to the receiving ship. The main advantage of this method is that the ships do not need to be dangerously close to each other, avoiding the risk of collision; VERTREP is also used to supplement and speed stores transfer between ships conducting CONREP. However, the maximum load and transfer speeds are both limited by the capacity of the helicopter, and fuel and other bulk liquids cannot be effectively supplied via VERTREP.

== Gallery ==
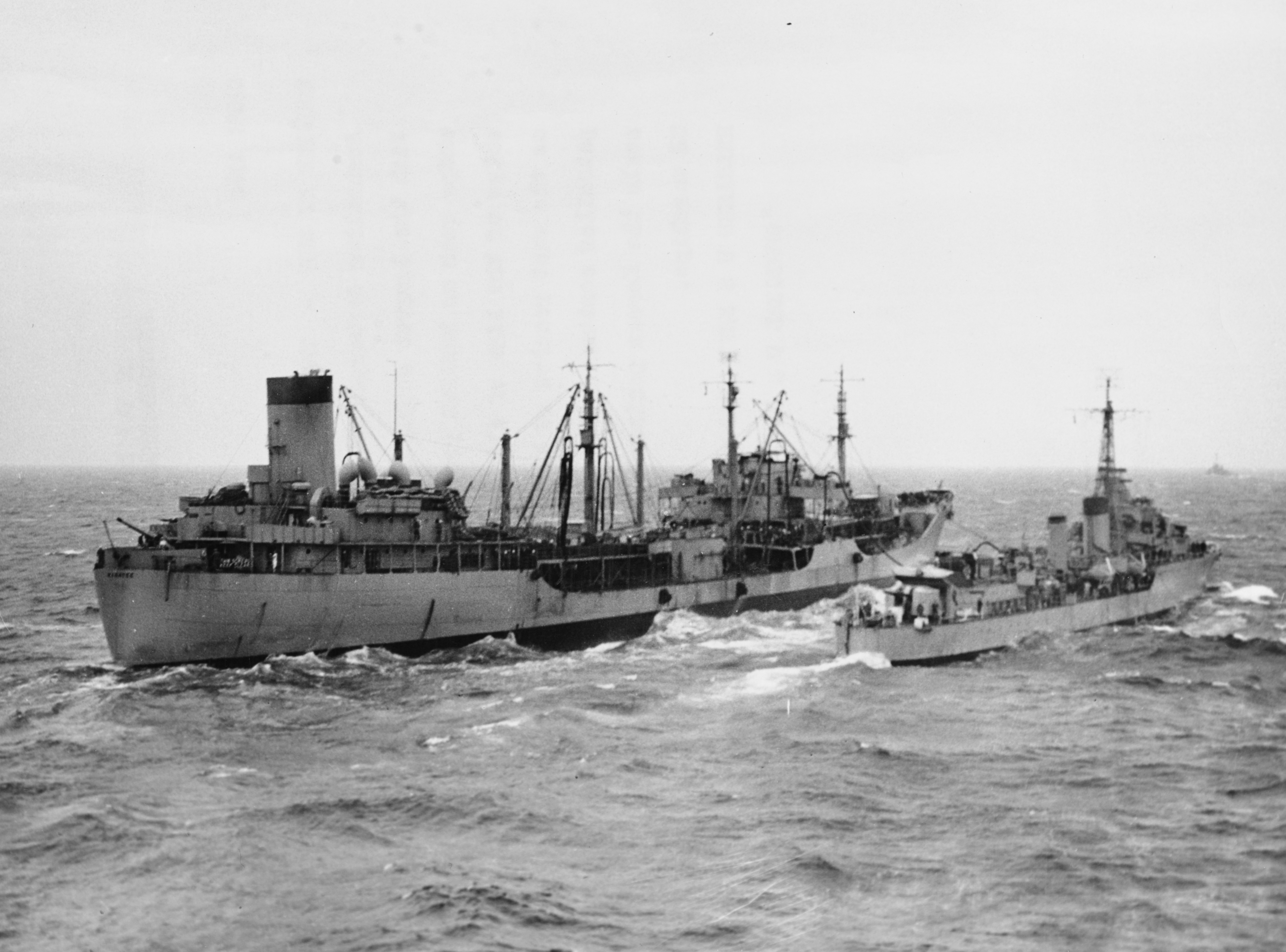
USS Manatee refueling HMAS Warramunga off Korea, 27 June 1951

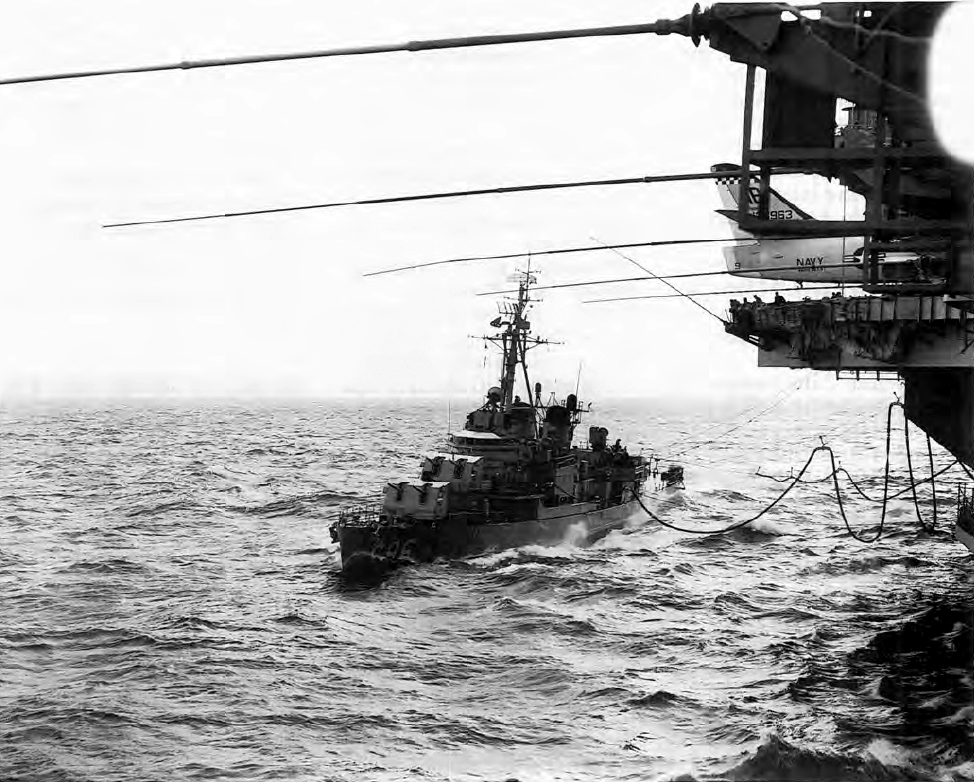
USS English refueling from USS Independence in October 1962

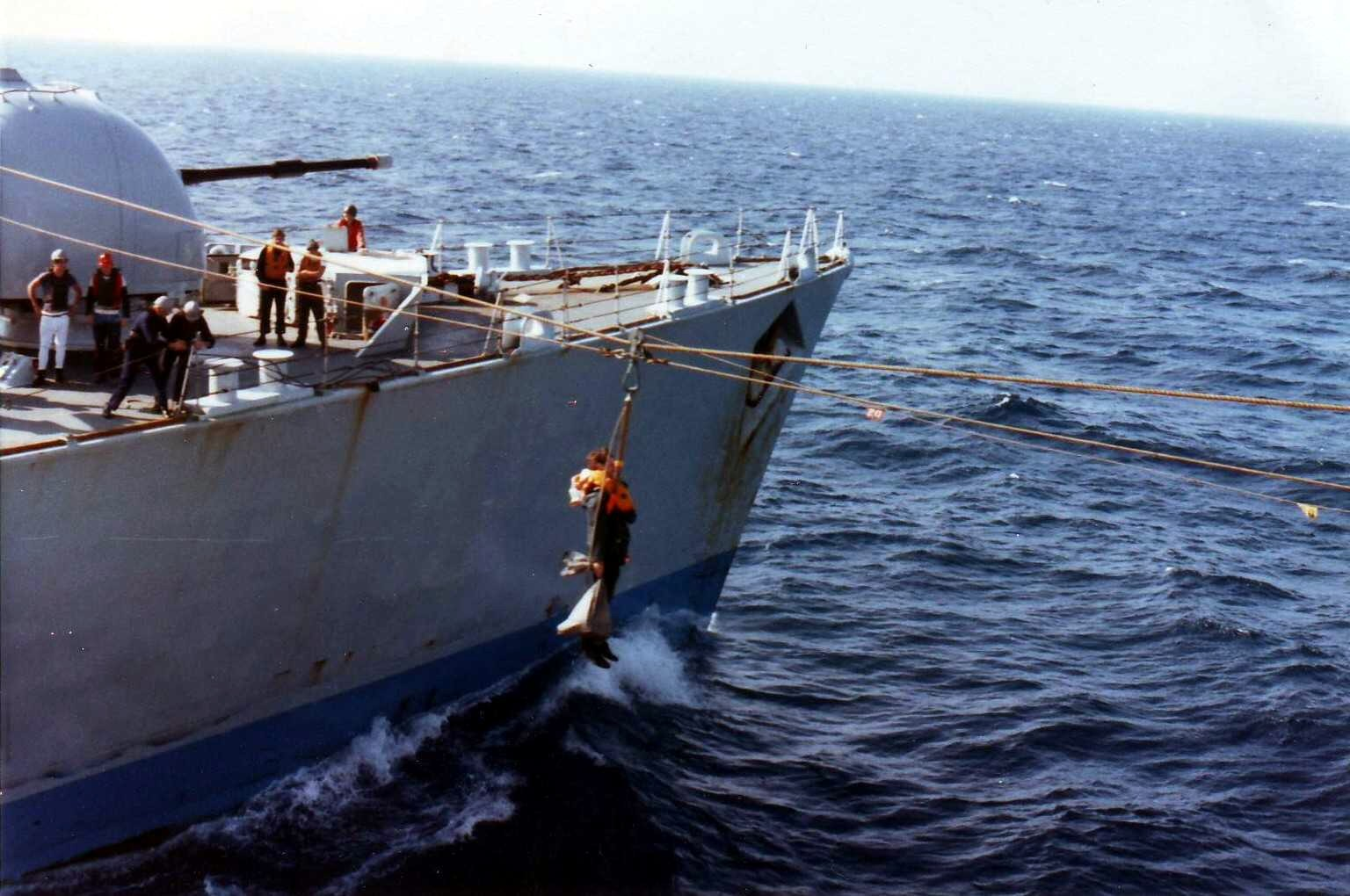
British sailor transferred by Light Jackstay, circa 1982

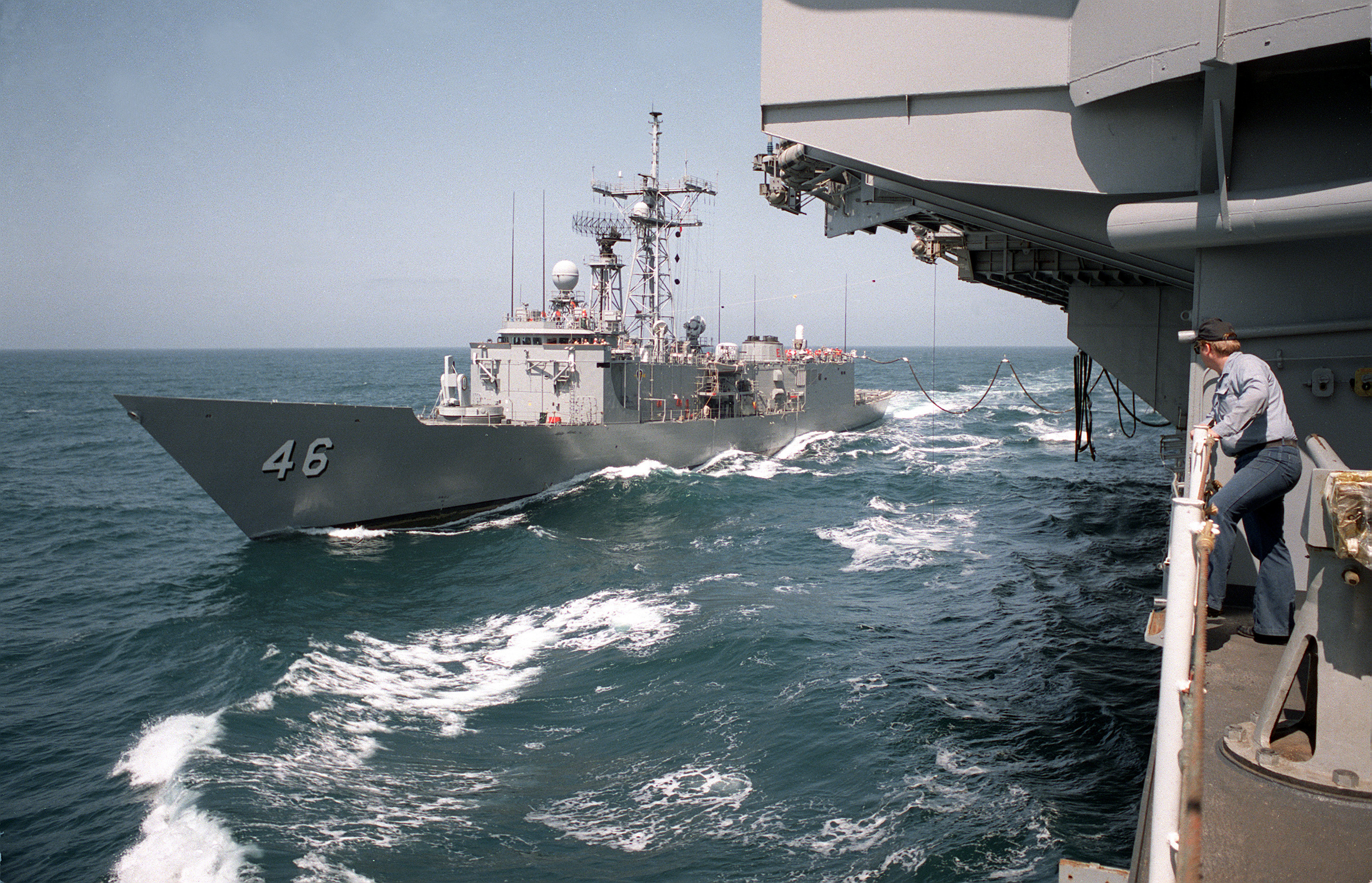
USS Ranger refueling USS Rentz, 29 April 1986

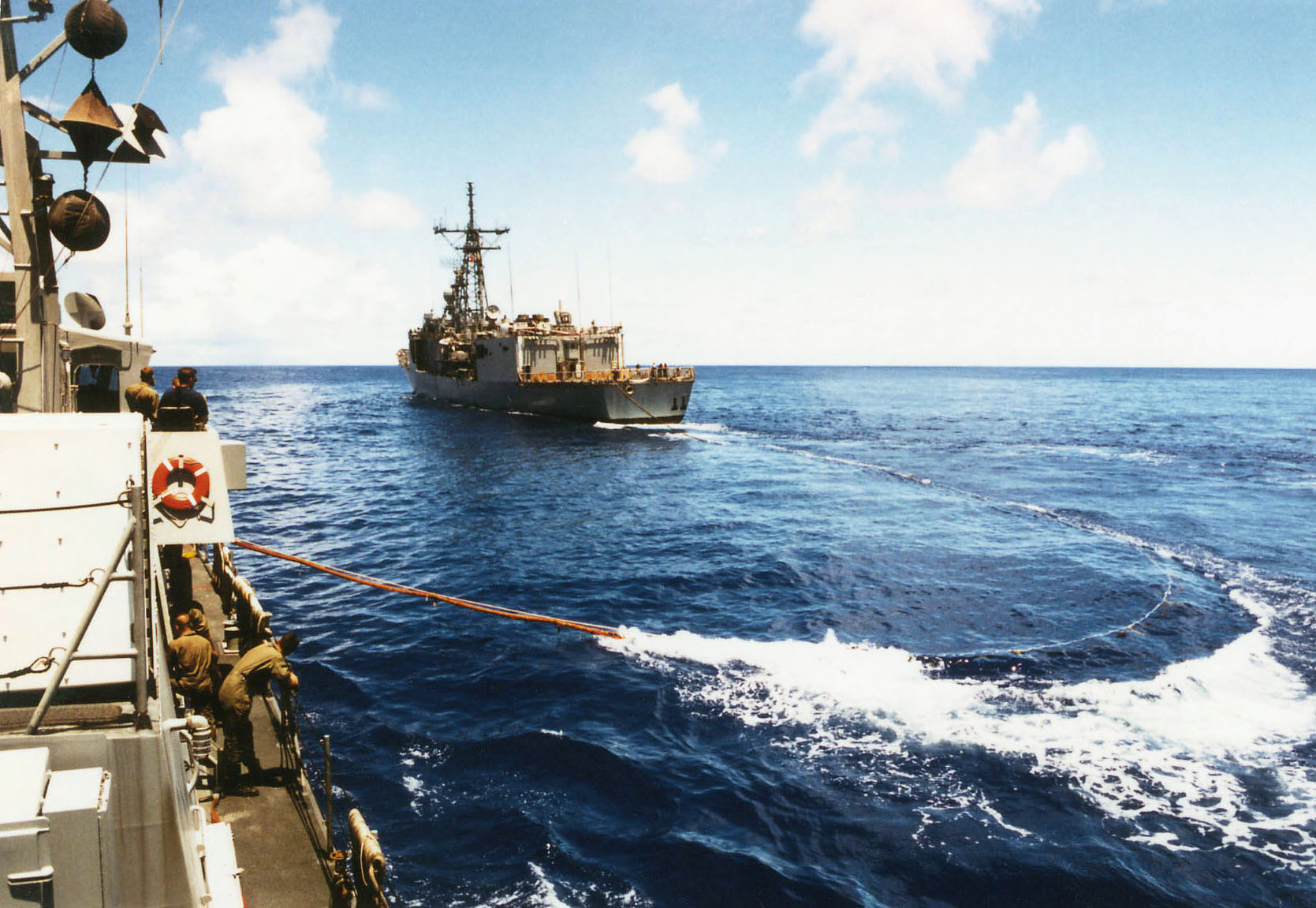
U.S. Navy astern refueling of a Cyclone-class patrol ship by an Oliver Hazard Perry-class frigate in 1998

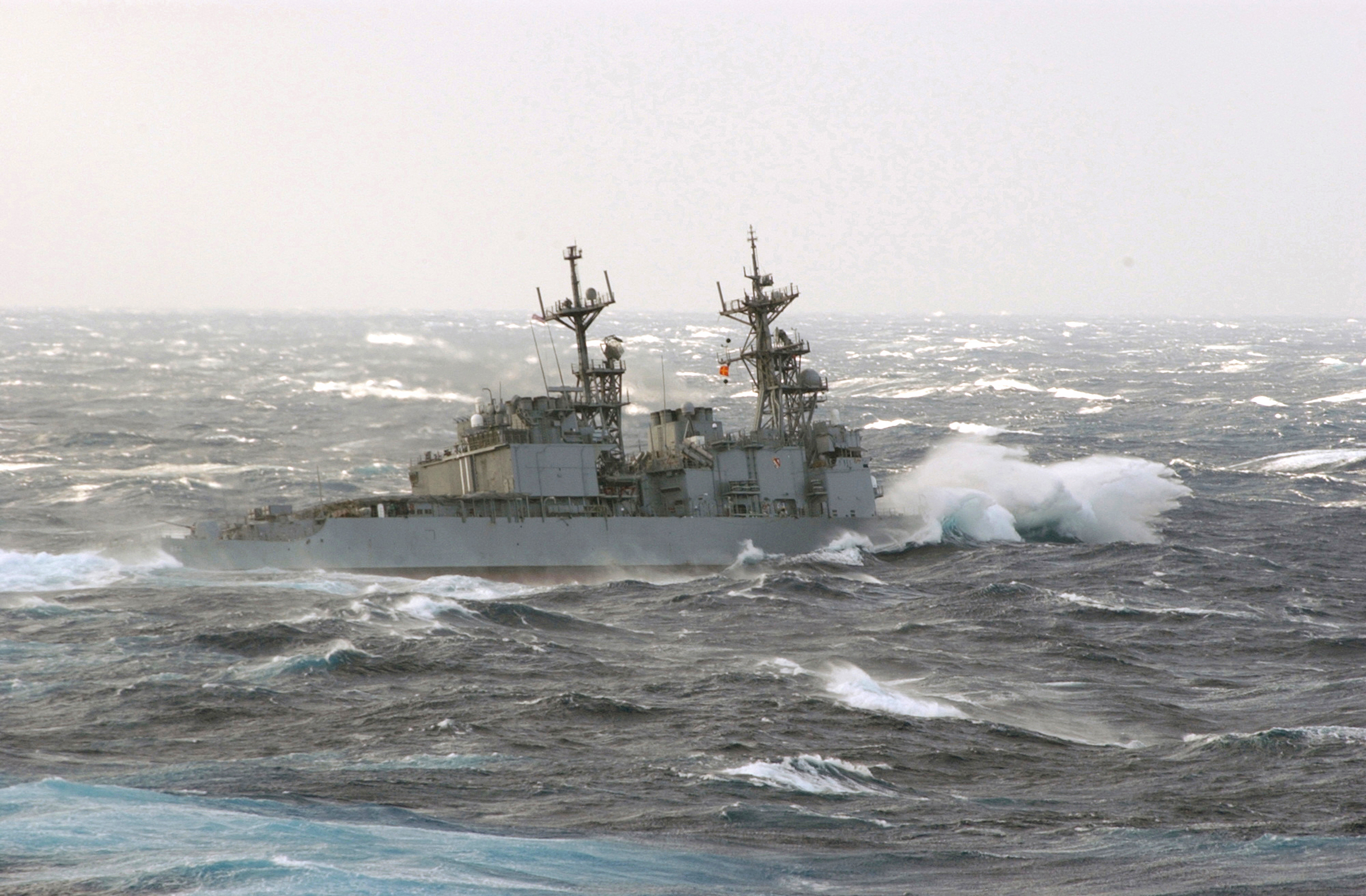
Heavy seas prohibit underway replenishment. USS Paul F. Foster gives up the attempt to come alongside, 2002.

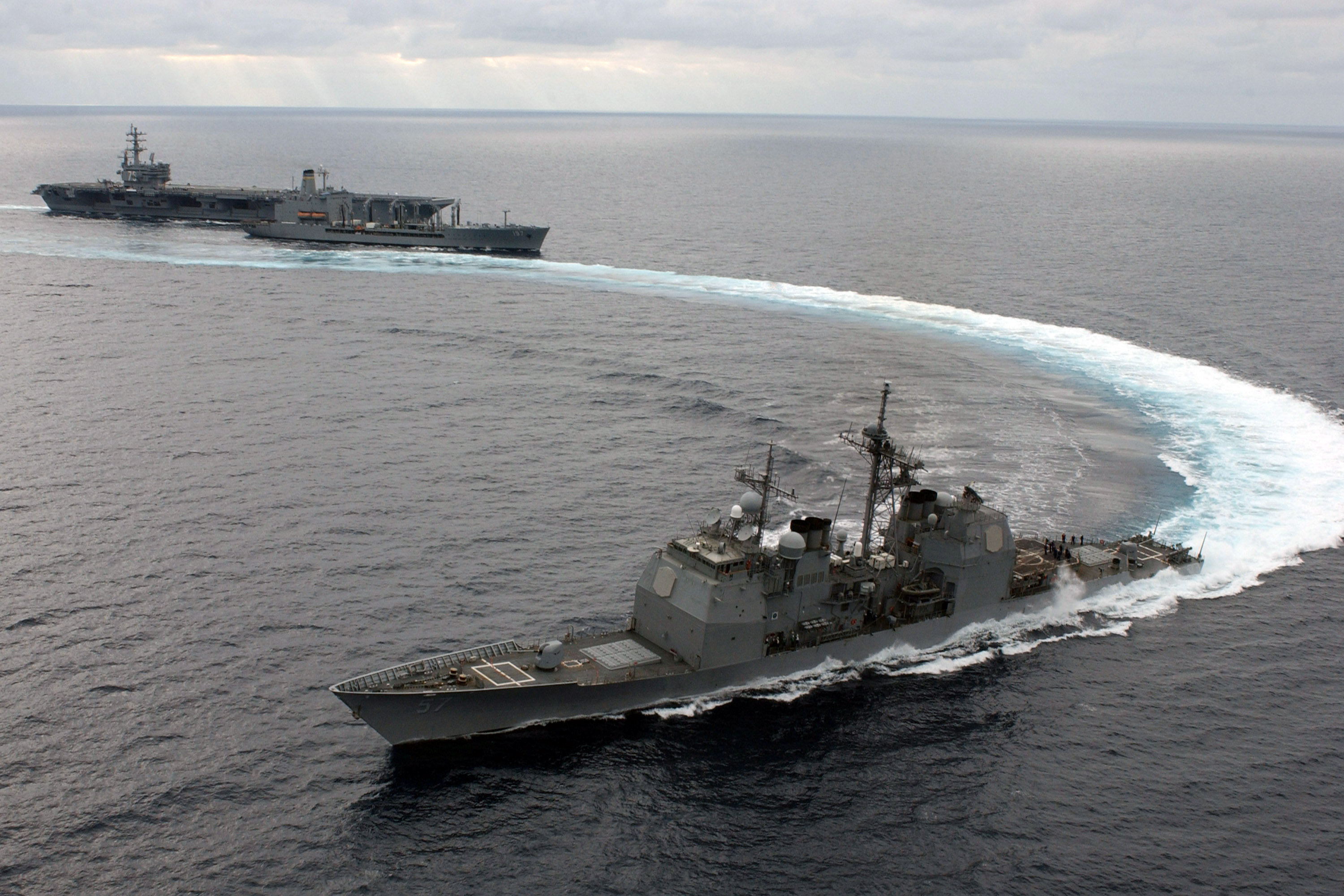
USS Lake Champlain conducting an emergency breakaway after refueling at sea, 2004

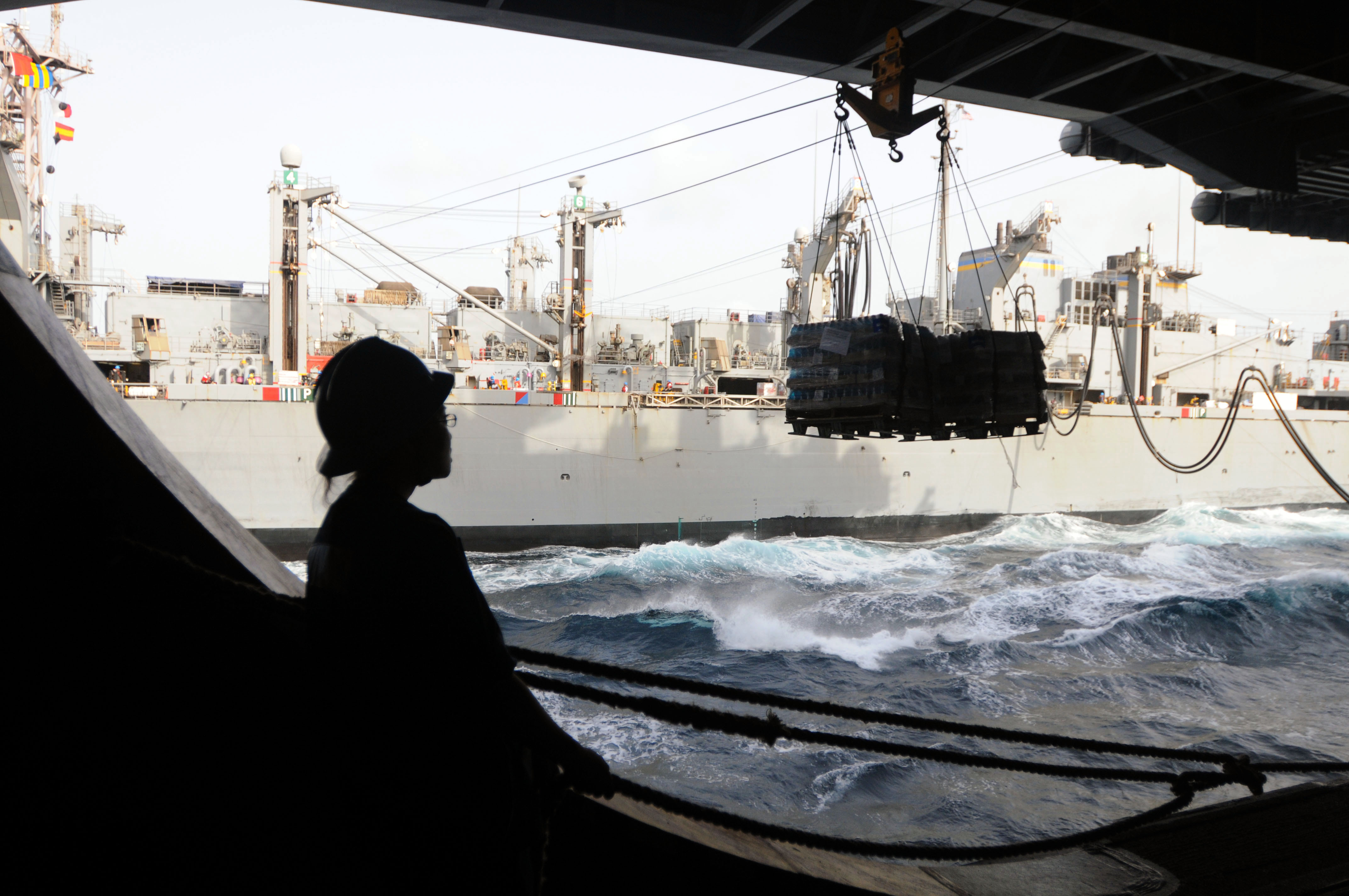
Moving pallets into the hangar of a Nimitz-class aircraft carrier in 2009

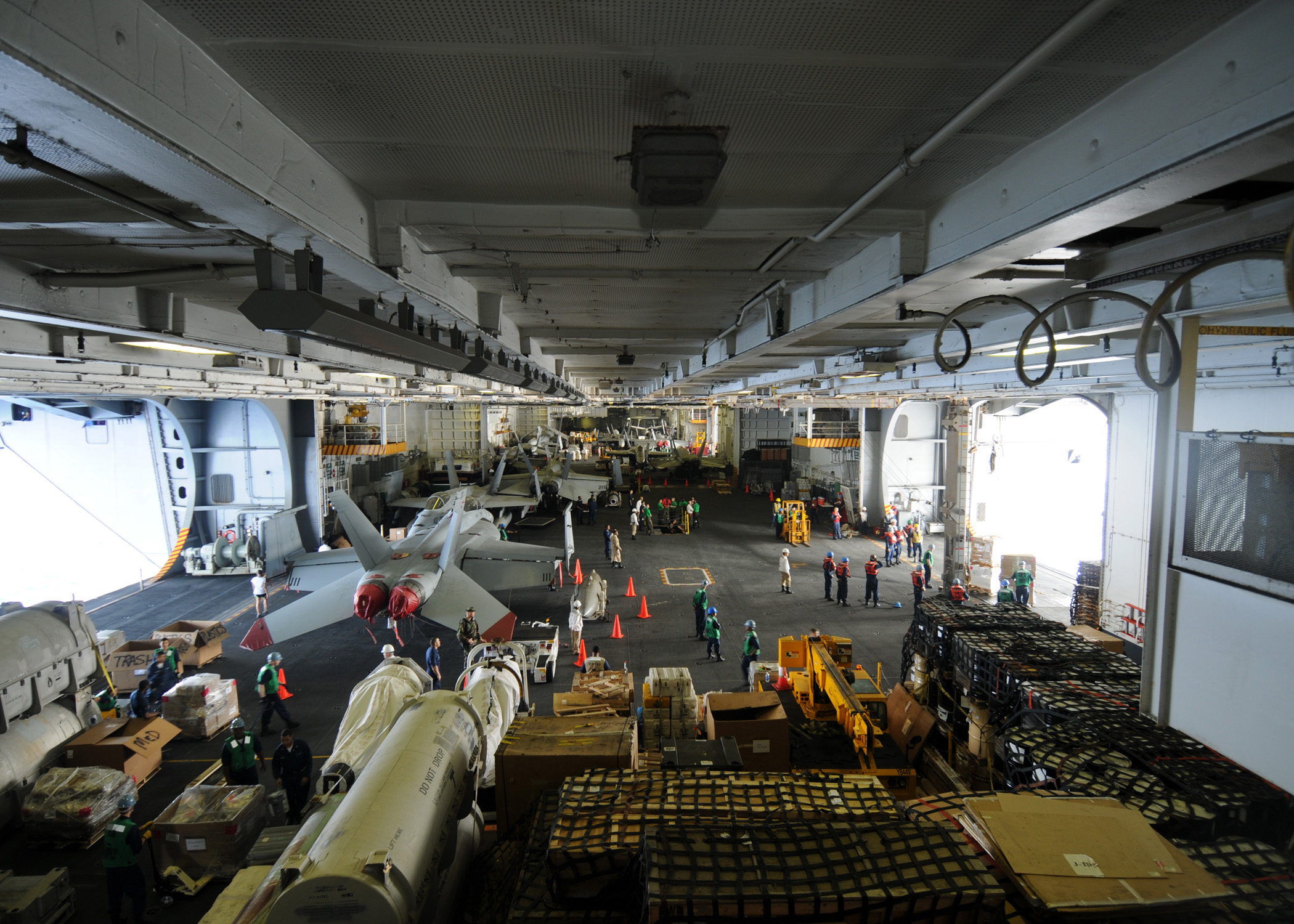
Supply and deck department sailors transfer cargo in the hangar bay of the aircraft carrier USS George Washington during a replenishment at sea, 2009.

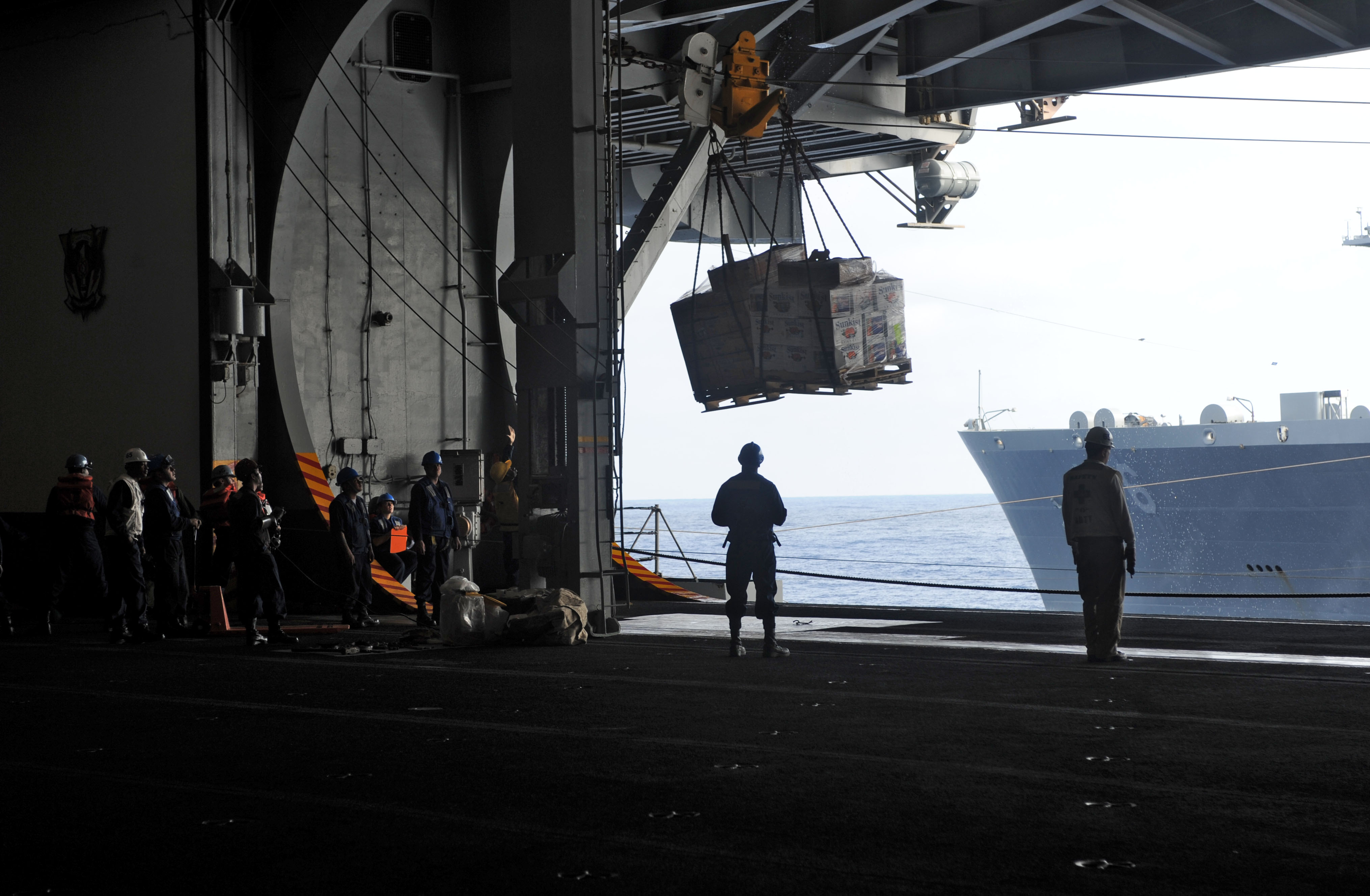
Moving pallets into the hangar of USS Enterprise, 2010

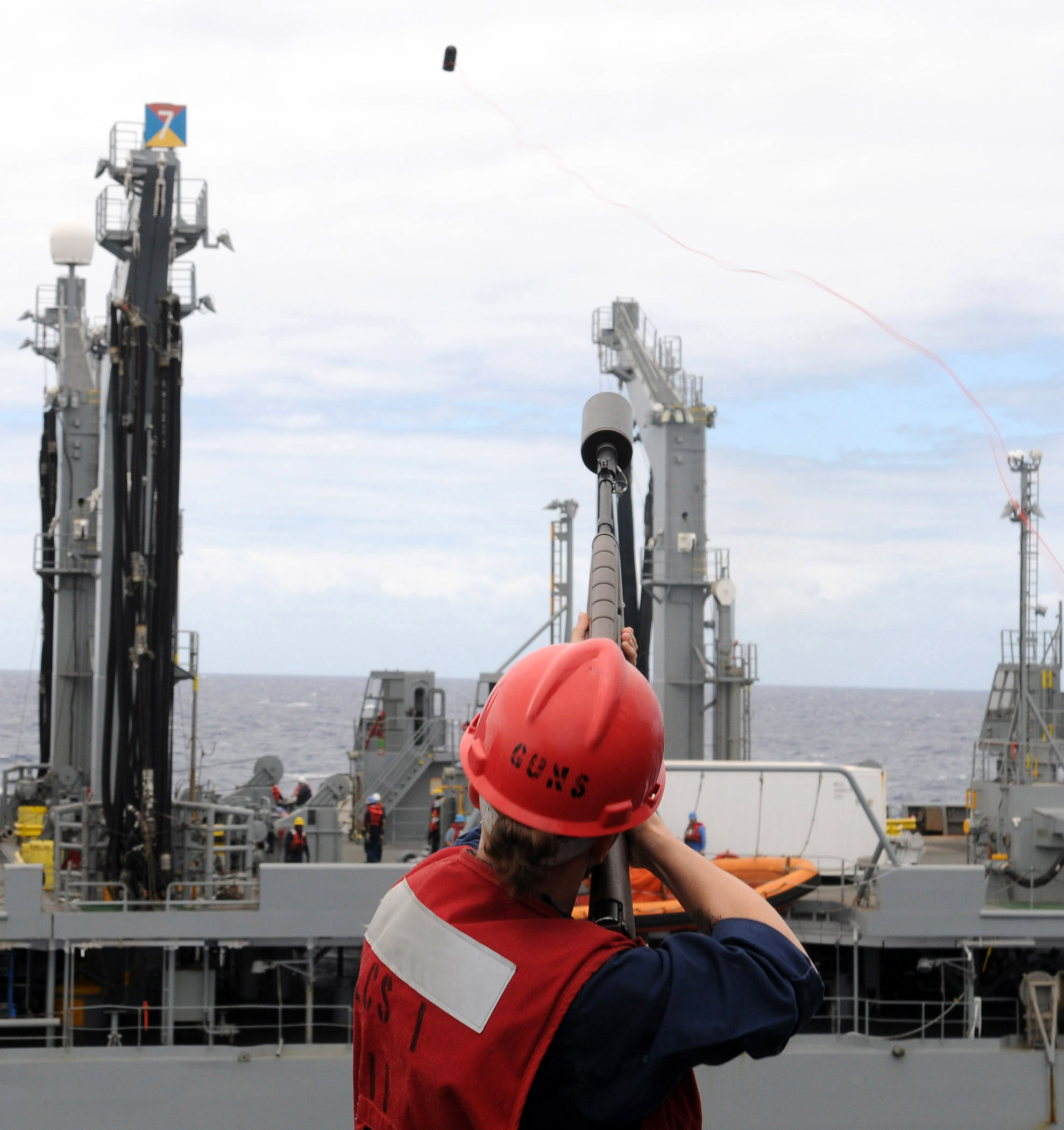
Shot line firing from USS Freedom to USNS Guadalupe, 2010

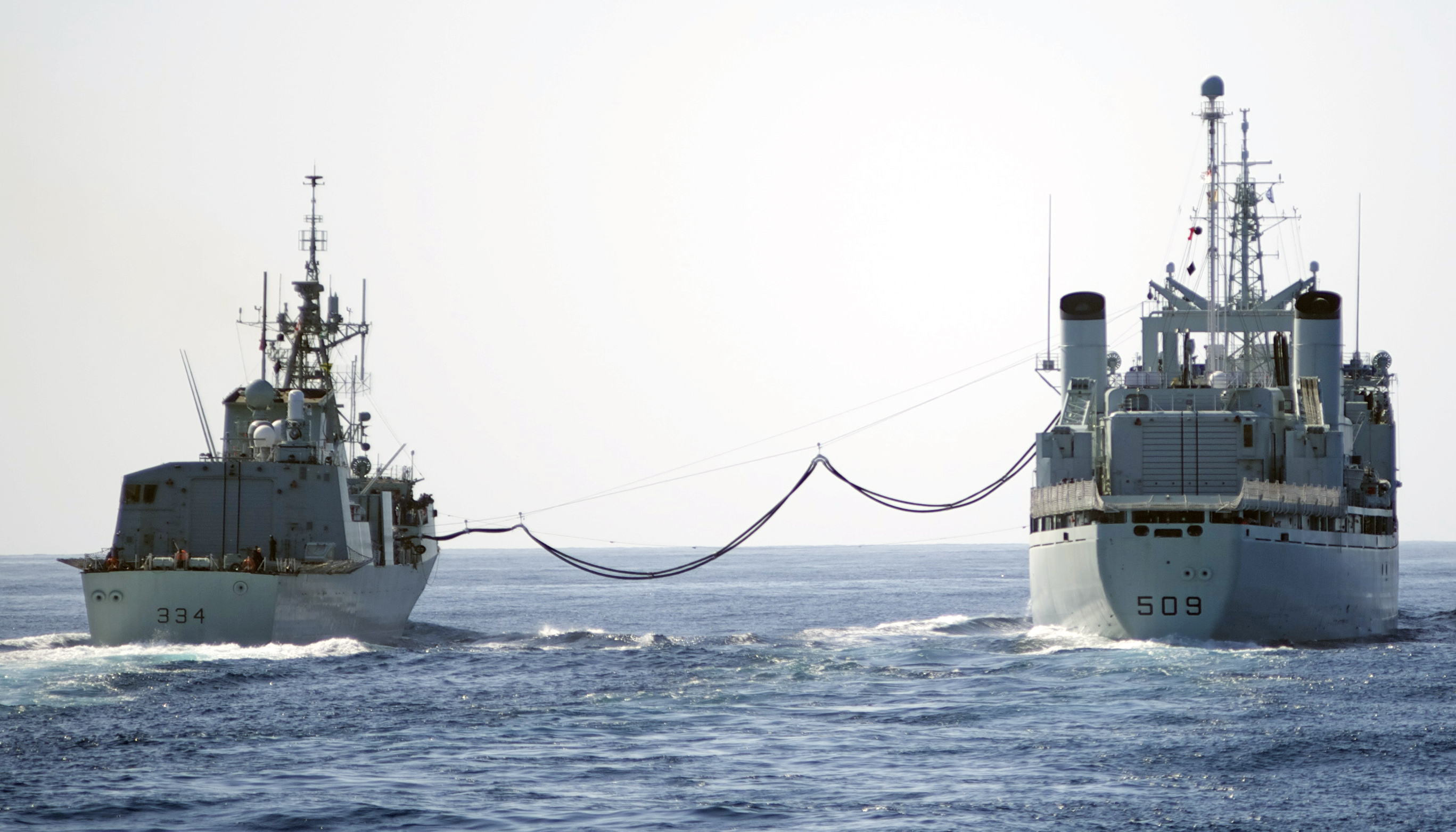
Royal Canadian Navy Frigate HMCS Regina being refueled by AOR HMCS Protecteur in the Pacific Ocean, 2013

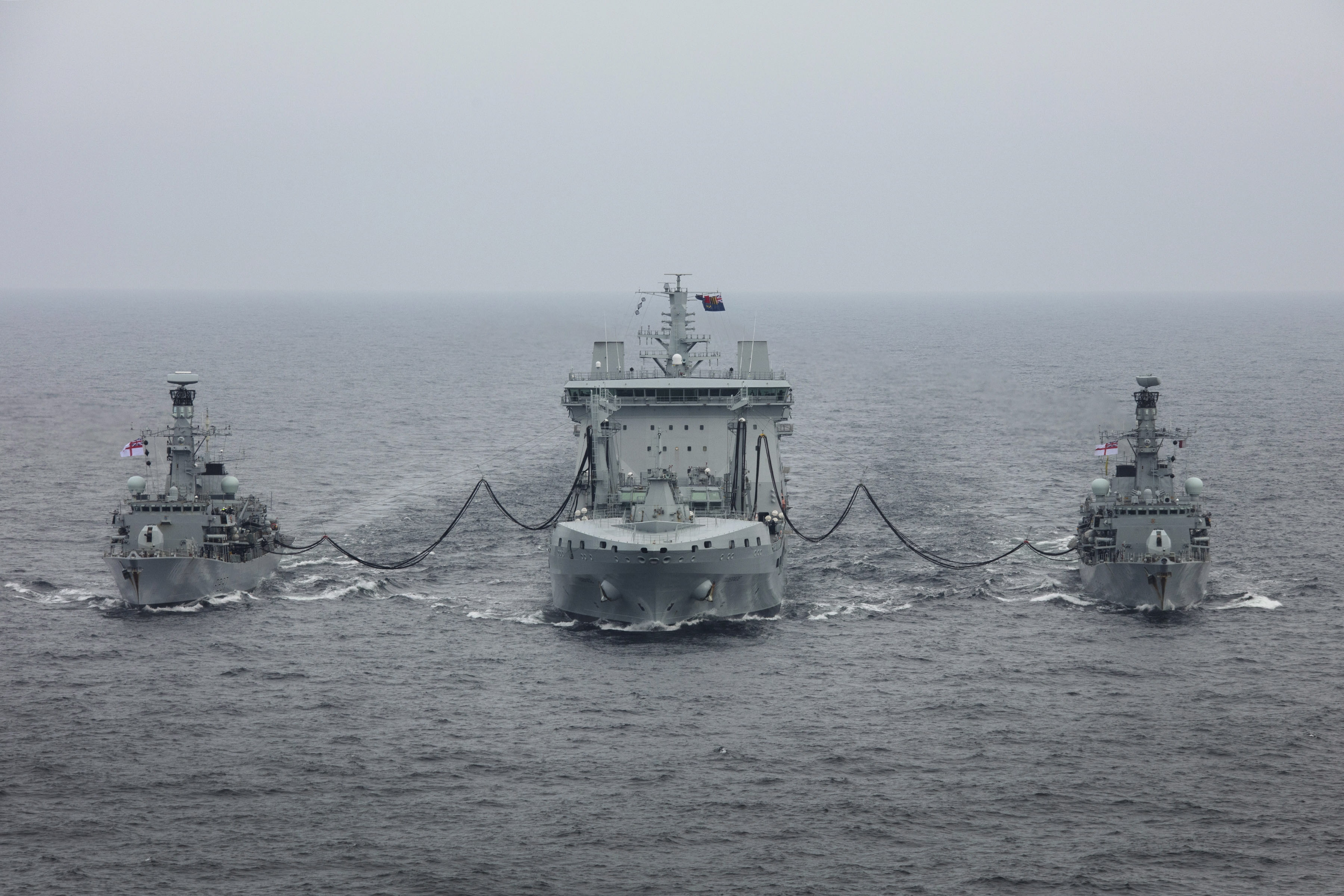
RFA Tiderace conducting a dual RAS with two Royal Navy frigates

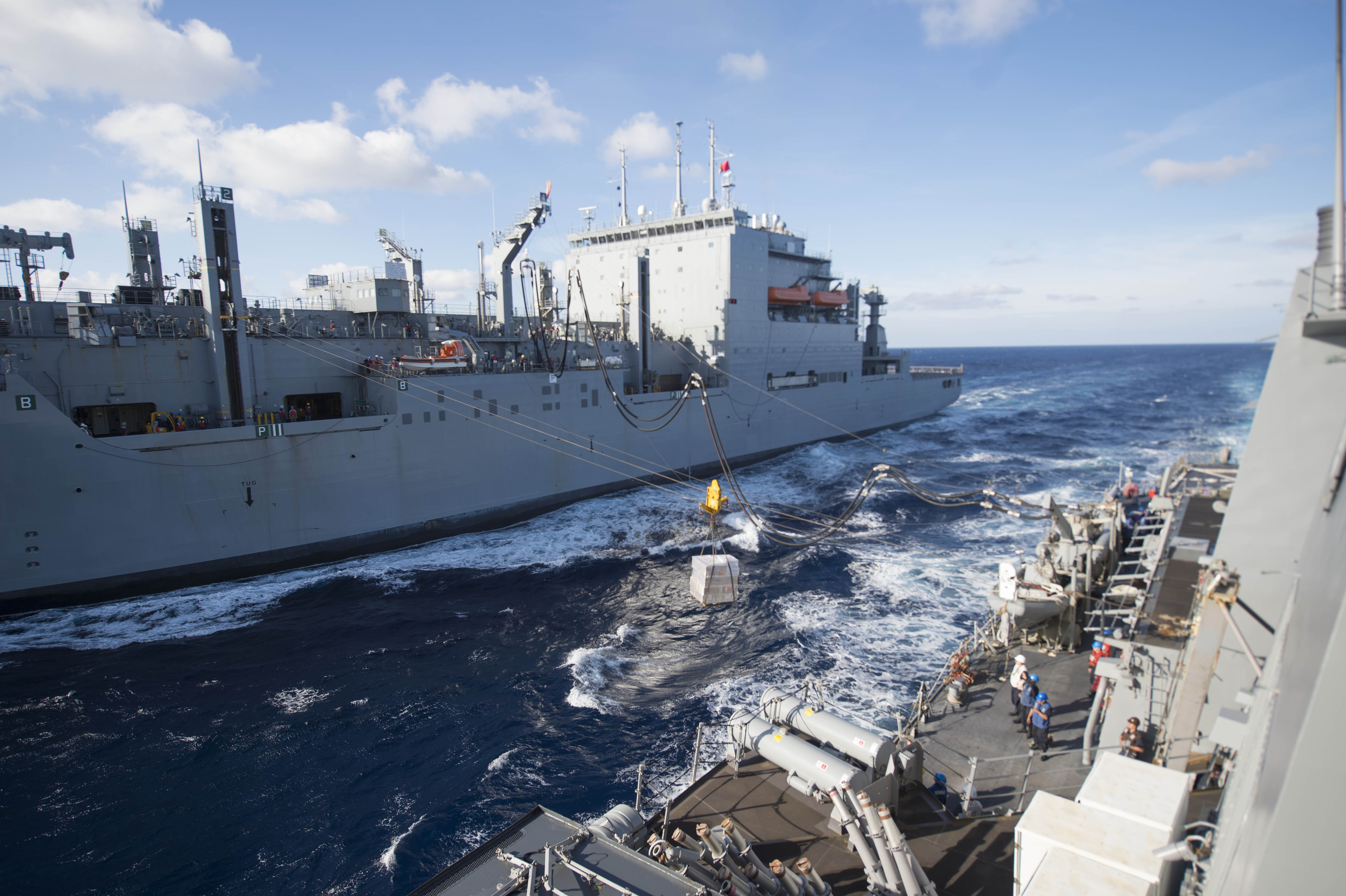
USS Carney receives cargo from the Military Sealift Command dry cargo/ammunition ship USNS William McLean during a replenishment-at-sea in the Mediterranean Sea, 2016.

== See also ==
- Replenishment oiler
- Carrier onboard delivery
- Aerial refueling
- Seabasing
- Military Sealift Command
- Military logistics

== Bibliography ==
- Burn, Gerald L.; Freivogel, Zvonimir; Johnson, Harold; Marshall, Peter; Sieche, Erwin F.; Smythe, A. J. (1998). "Question 40/97: Early Underway Refueling". Warship International. XXXV (3): 318–319. ISSN 0043-0374.
- Fuquea, David C. (January 2020). "Advantage Japan: The Imperial Japanese Navy's Superior High Seas Refueling Capability". Journal of Military History. 84 (1): 213–235. ISSN 0899-3718.
- Wildenberg, Thomas (1996). "Gray Steel and Black Oil: Fast Tankers and Replenishment at Sea in the U.S. Navy, 1912–1995". Annapolis, Maryland: Naval Institute Press. ISBN 1-55750-934-4.
