= General quarters =

Announcement made aboard a naval warship

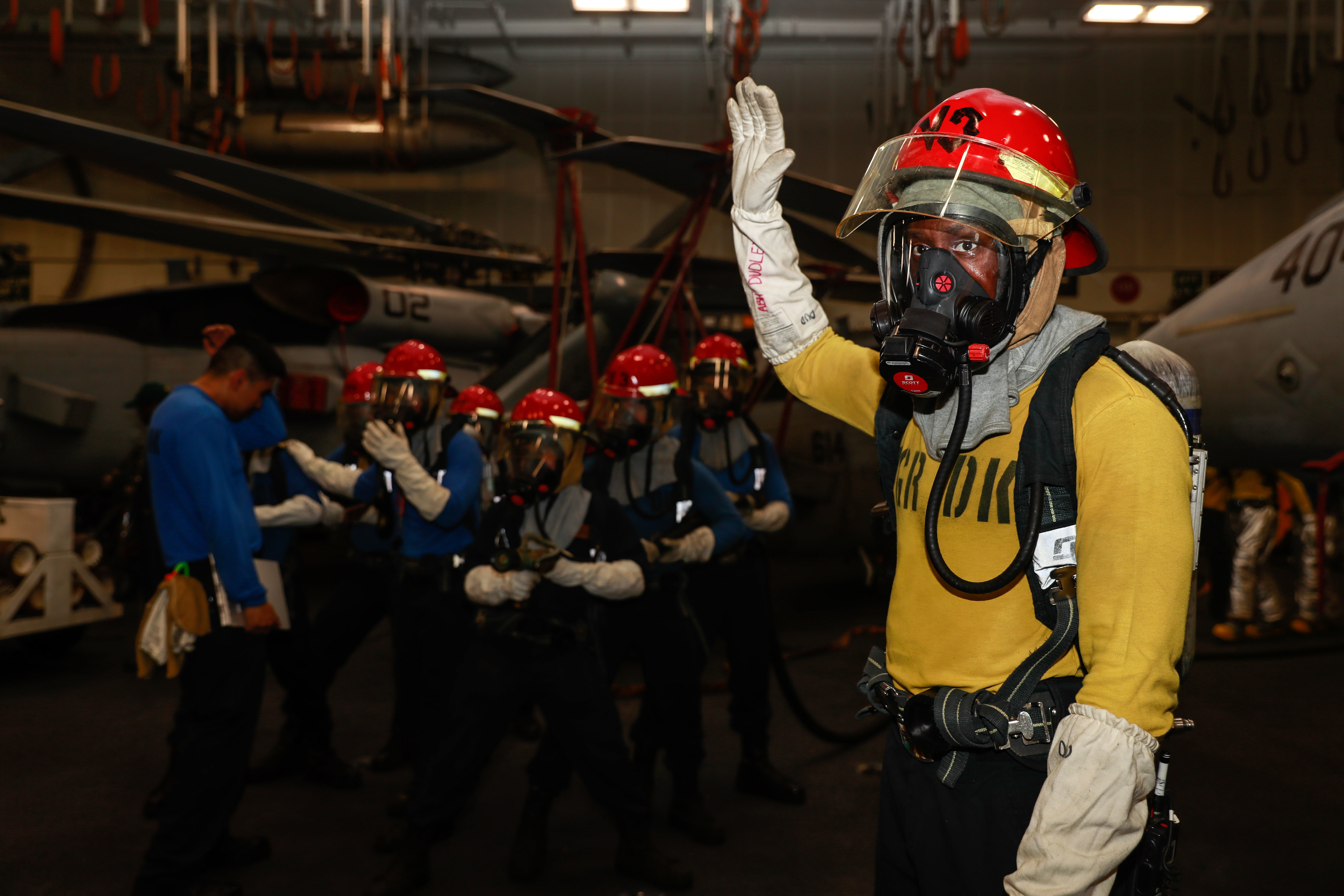
A general quarters drill taking place aboard the USS Abraham Lincoln

Audio snippet of a general quarters drill aboard USS Nimitz in the early 2010s

General quarters
A call to general quarters aboard a United States Navy vessel in the 20th century.

General quarters, battle stations, or action stations is an announcement made aboard a naval warship to signal that all hands (everyone available) aboard a ship must go to battle stations (the positions they are to assume when the vessel is in combat) as quickly as possible.

According to The Encyclopedia of War, formerly "[i]n naval service, the phrase 'beat to quarters' indicated a particular kind of drum roll that ordered sailors to their posts for a fight where some would load and prepare to fire the ship's guns and others would arm with muskets and ascend the rigging as sharpshooters in preparation for combat."

Aboard U.S. Navy vessels, the following announcement would be made using the vessel’s public address system (known as the 1MC):

General Quarters, General Quarters. All hands, man your battle stations. The route of travel is forward and up to starboard, down and aft to port. Set material condition 'Zebra' throughout the ship. Reason for General Quarters: [Inbound hostile aircraft/Hostile surface contact/etc.]

Aboard Royal Navy and Commonwealth Navy vessels the command would be:

"Hands to Action Stations, Hands to Action Stations. Assume NBCD State 1, Condition Zulu"

NBCD (Nuclear, Biological, and Chemical Defence) has largely been replaced by CBRN (Chemical, Biological, Radiological, and Nuclear) in modern military and emergency service terminology. Condition Zulu means that all hatches, doors, and vents marked with a "Z" (Zulu) on the fitting must be closed and sealed. Under Condition Zulu, hatches generally cannot be opened without explicit permission from the Damage Control Officer.

== See also ==
- List of established military terms
