= Line thrower =

Device that casts a line to a remote position

A line thrower is a device that casts a line to a remote position. It is used in rescues as well as marine operations. A line thrower may employ a variety of launching methods including guns, rockets, and pneumatics.

== History ==
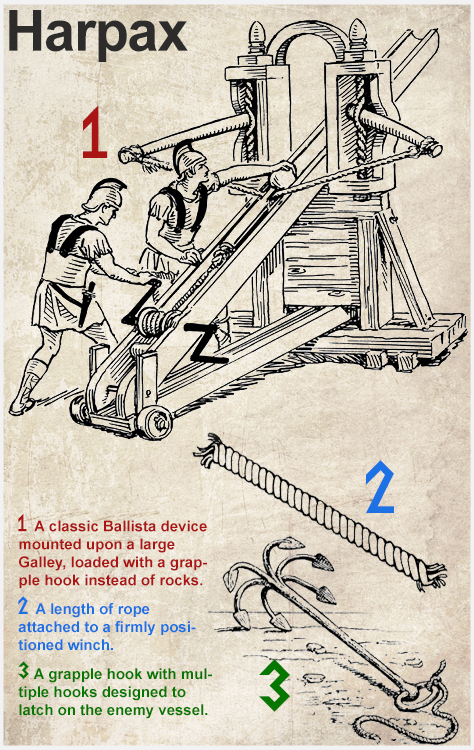
The parts of the Harpax

Roman general Marcus Vipsanius Agrippa created the harpax, a ship-based grapnel that could be fired by a ballista. The harpax allowed an enemy vessel to be harpooned and then winched alongside for boarding. Appian explains the device as "a piece of wood, five cubits long bound with iron and having rings at the extremities. To one of these rings was attached the grip itself, an iron claw, to the other numerous ropes, which drew it by machine power after it had been thrown by a catapult and had seized the enemy's ships." The harpax had a distinct advantage over the corvus, the traditional naval boarding bridge, in that it was much lighter; the corvus boarding bridge is estimated to have weighed a ton. The harpax could be thrown long distances due its light weight and could be discharged by a ballista as if it were a heavy dart. Furthermore, the harpax was composed of iron bands that could not be cut, and the ropes could not be cut due to the length of the iron grapple. It was first deployed by Agrippa in 36 BC during the naval battles of the Sicilian revolt against the fleet of Sextus Pompey, during which Sextus lost 180 of a total force of 300 warships - 28 by ramming and 155 by capture and by fire. Appian notes that "as this apparatus had never been known before, the enemy had not provided themselves with scythe-mounted poles."

In 1791, John Bell proposed a system to launch a line from a ship in distress to the shore, but this does not seem to have ever been implemented.

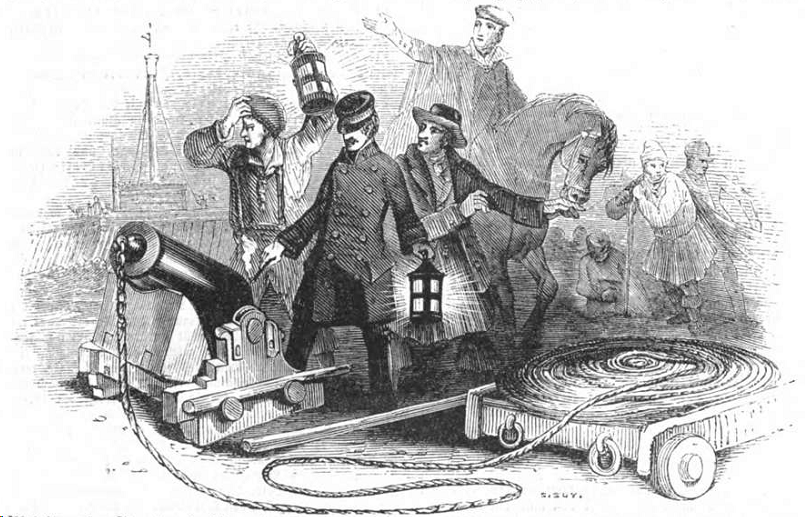
Manby mortar, 1842 drawing

Following the 1807 grounding of HMS Snipe, in which 67 lives were lost despite being just 50 yards from shore, George William Manby developed the Manby mortar that same year. His device was a line fastened to a barbed shot which was fired from a mortar on the shore. By means of this line a hawser was drawn out from the shore to the ship, and along it was run a cradle in which the shipwrecked persons were landed. It was used in a rescue in 1808, making it the first successful line thrower. In 1814, it was installed at 59 British rescue stations in the next two years.

In 1808, Henry Trengrouse designed a rocket-based system which was similar to Manby's in the use of the line and hawser, but instead of a mortar he suggested a rocket, and a chair was used instead of a cradle. The distinctive features of the apparatus consisted of ‘a section of a cylinder, which is fitted to the barrel of a musket by a bayonet socket; a rocket with a line attached to its stick is so placed in it that its priming receives fire immediately from the barrel’. The advantages were that the rocket was much lighter and more portable than the mortar; that the cost was much smaller; that there was little risk of the line breaking, because the velocity of a rocket increases gradually, whereas that of a shot fired from a mortar was so great and sudden that the line was frequently broken; the whole of Trengrouse's apparatus could, moreover, be packed in a chest four feet three inches by one foot six inches, and carried by vessels of every size, while Manby contemplated the use of the mortar only on shore, and the safety of the vessel depended therefore on the presence of an apparatus in the vicinity of the wreck.

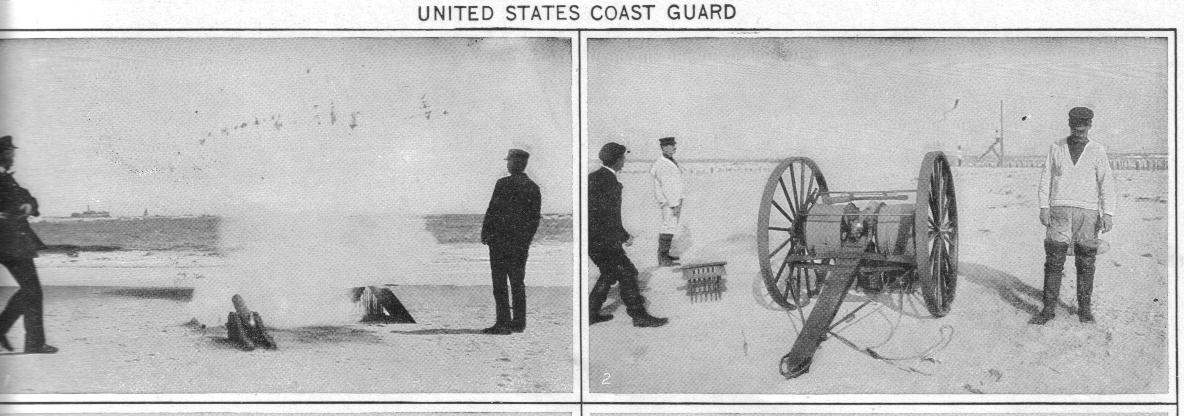
Lyle gun being fired

In 1877, David A. Lyle, a first lieutenant in the United States Army, was engaged by Sumner Increase Kimball, the only superintendent of the U.S. Life-Saving Service, and developed 3 bronze, smooth-bore guns of different sizes to be used as line throwers. The 2 1/2-inch-bore (64 mm) gun became the standard line-throwing gun and came to be known as the Lyle gun.

In 1855, the Boxer rocket was developed, a two-stage rocket used in rescue line applications until World War II.

== Modern systems ==
Modern rocket-based systems are a common choice for vessels that require a line-throwing apparatus to meet the SOLAS requirements, but in the late 1980s, pneumatic line throwers were invented and are preferred in many instances. Shoulder-fired line-throwing guns are available, and there are also slingshot-based systems.

== Gallery ==
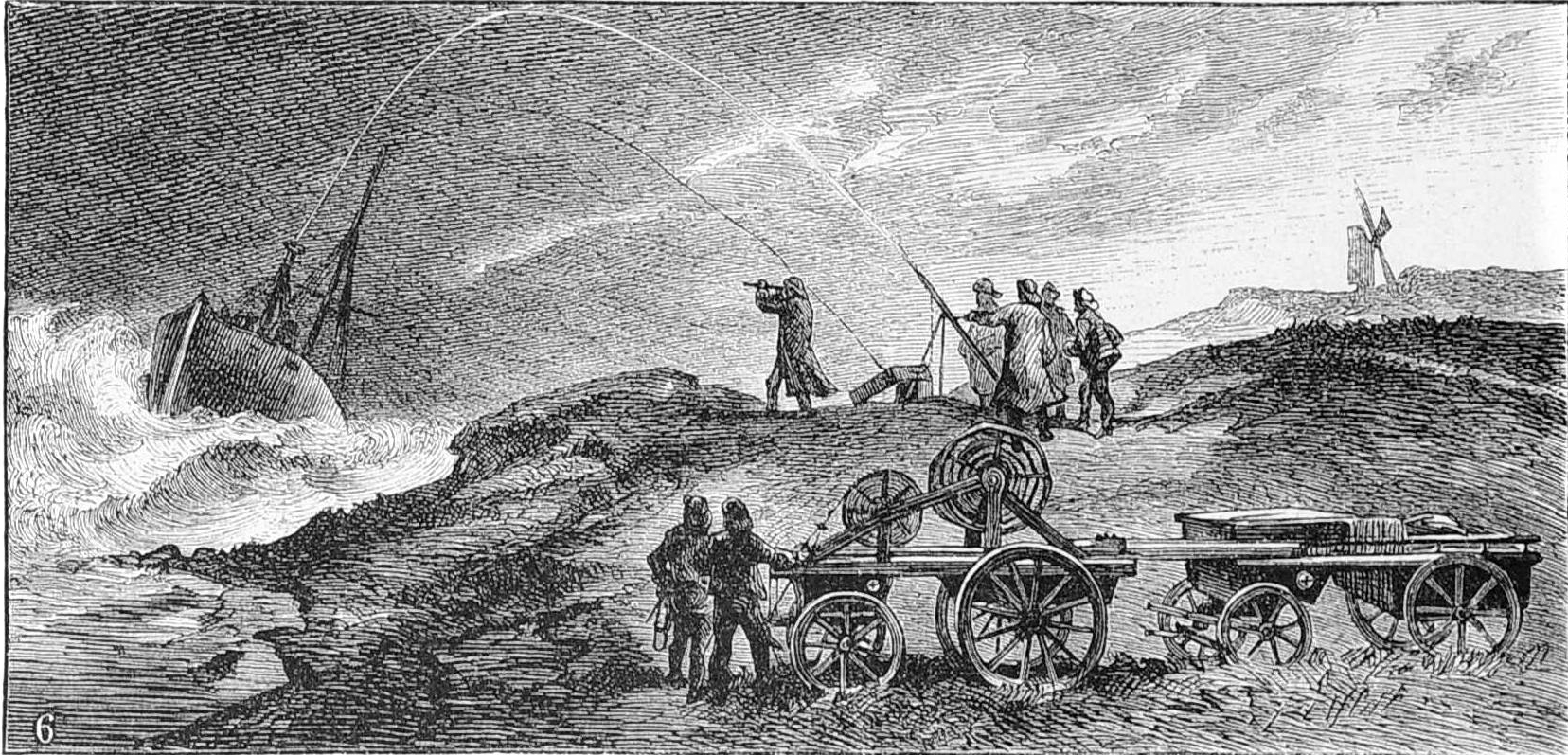
German DGzRS using a line thrower in the 1880s

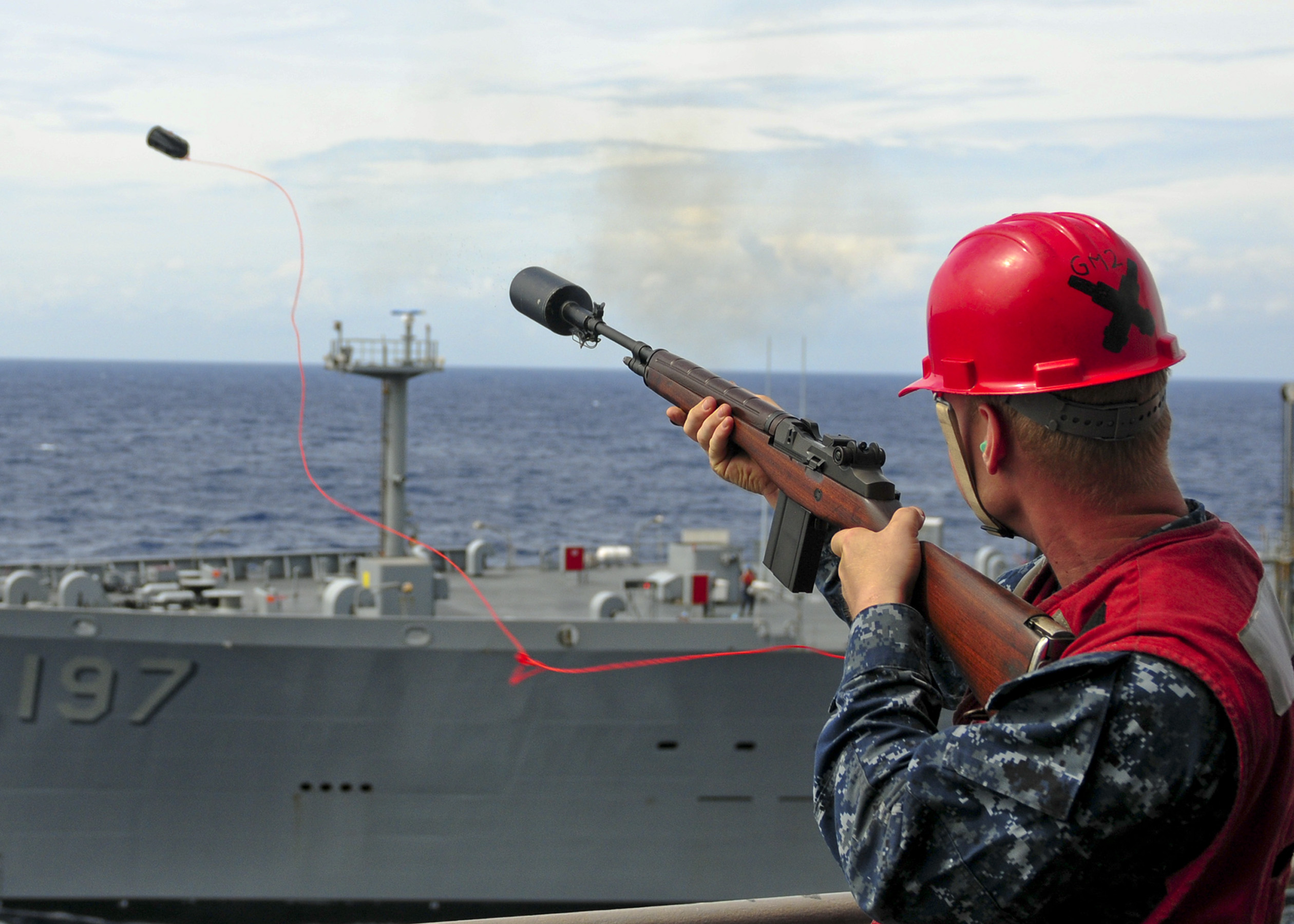
A United States Navy sailor using a line thrower
