= Pneumatic line thrower =

Pneumatic line throwers can be used for a variety of applications including underway replenishment (UNREPS), replenishment at sea (RASing), ship to ship line deployment, ship to shore line deployment, water rescue, high angle rescue, cable running in industrial applications, and tactical line deployment. Line throwers come in two categories: pyrotechnic and pneumatic.

Pyrotechnical line throwers are inherently dangerous as they contain explosives which, when triggered, propel a line forward. This equipment should be stored, handled and used appropriately. This equipment requires significant training in order to ensure correct use and to avoid accidents.

In the late 1980s, pneumatic line throwers were invented to provide a product that is safer, cost effective, and has long delivery distances.

== Technology ==
Pneumatic systems have three basic components: the launcher, a projectile, and the line. These systems are based on Newton's third law of motion – every action has an equal and opposite reaction. As the pressure inside the launcher is released, the air escaping pushes the projectile with a forward momentum. There are no reverse blasts from the muzzle or projectile.

The exact delivery distance of the line thrower is largely determined by the weight of the projectile and a given line and the amount of pressure and volume of compressed air. In general terms, the lighter the line, the farther the line can be deployed. Strong, lightweight line made of Dacron or Spectra material is used for applications requiring long delivery distances, such as replenishment at sea. This type of line is also referred to as messenger line and is deployed with the intention of using it to draw larger, stronger ropes and cables across a body of water or geological obstacle.

Heavier line can be deployed directly for applications with shorter ranges. Polyspectra and polypropylene lines are examples of ropes used for water rescue. Depending on the type of line throwing device used, the line can also be accompanied with an auto-inflating sling to keep a drowning victim afloat. Climbing line of various diameters can be deployed horizontally or vertically in order facilitate tactical highline or tactical vertical ascent. These lines are sometimes deployed with a grappling hook made from titanium and allow an individual to scale multistory buildings or shipping vessels

== Applications ==
The basic applications of pneumatic line throwers are ship-to-ship line deployment for replenishment at sea or towing, ship-to-shore line deployment for mooring or transfers, water rescue, industrial cable installation such as catenaries, and tactical line deployment such as climbing and military applications.

There are also a number of more unconventional applications. These include using a modified pneumatic line thrower as an air gun to tag or attach transmitters to whales. This technique has been used in several studies: bowhead whales off West Greenland, minke whales off northern Norway, and a collision study of humpback whales off Panama.

== History ==
There are several pneumatic line throwers on the market and depending on the exact technology; they deliver a line different distances. One of the original line-throwing devices was the Rescue Rocket. Made of fabric and aluminum parts, this line thrower was a bit clumsy to operate, had relatively short delivery distances, and was specifically used for water rescue.

The Rescue Rocket was replaced by other pneumatic line throwers in 1989. There are several interchangeable projectile types which provide for differing deployment distances and the launchers can be supplied with almost any type of rope. The range of payloads are not limited to rope, systems can also be equipped with ladders.
