= Breakaway music =

Breakaway music is a modern U.S. Naval tradition used to motivate sailors upon the conclusion of underway replenishment (UNREP), although using breakaway music is at the discretion of the captain, and not all commands use it. When the two ships involved in the UNREP conclude their transfer of fuels and stores and commence their breakaway, a song is played over the 1 Main Circuit. The song may be selected by the captain, the officer of the deck (OOD), or the navigation officer. Some commands will allow the crew to vote on a song from a list of popular choices, usually during morning quarters. Breakaway music may sometimes be related to the name of the ship, such as the "Theme from Star Trek" (USS Enterprise (CVN-65)) or "Kansas City, Here I Come" (USS Kansas City (AOR-3)). The fast combat support ship, and oiler, USS Camden (AOE-2) played the "Baby Elephant Walk" (written in 1961 by composer Henry Mancini, for the 1962 release of the movie Hatari!) after each UNREP in honor of its nickname "The Powerful Pachyderm of the Pacific".
