= Temperley transporter =

Early form of overhead crane

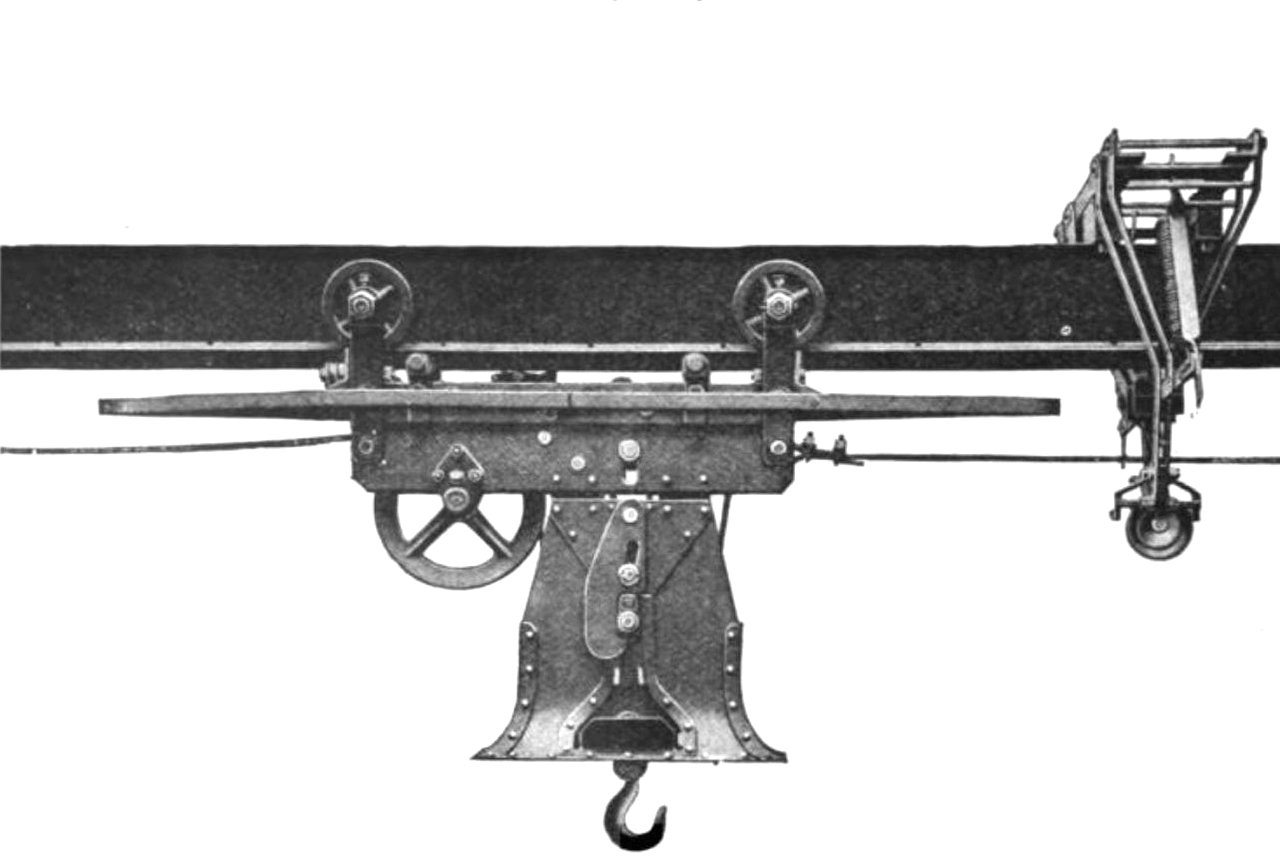
A photograph of a transporter circa 1904.

Schematic of a later design for hauling heavy loads fitted with a scooping grab.

A Temperley transporter is an early form of overhead crane invented by John Ridley Temperley in 1892. They were manufactured by the Temperley Transporter Company of London.

== Relevant patents ==
- GB0021170 issued in the United Kingdom in 1892
- US 615370, Temperley, Joseph, "Means For Supporting Ropes of Elevated Carriers", issued Dec 6, 1898
- US 637182, Temperley, Joseph & Temperley, John Ridley, "Apparatus for Dumping, Depositing, or Releasing Loads Suspended From Cranes, &c.", issued Nov 14, 1899
- US 883841, Temperley, Joseph; Temperley, John Ridley & Alexander, William, "Transporting Appliance And The Like", issued Apr 7, 1908
- US 887873, Temperley, Joseph; Temperley, John Ridley & Alexander, William, "Cable Transporter", issued May 19, 1908
- US 894,083, Temperley, Joseph; Temperley, John Ridley & Alexander, William, "Apparatus for Raising, Lowering, and Conveying or Transporting Loads", issued Jul 21, 1908
