= 1 Main Circuit =

Shipboard public address circuits used by the United States Navy

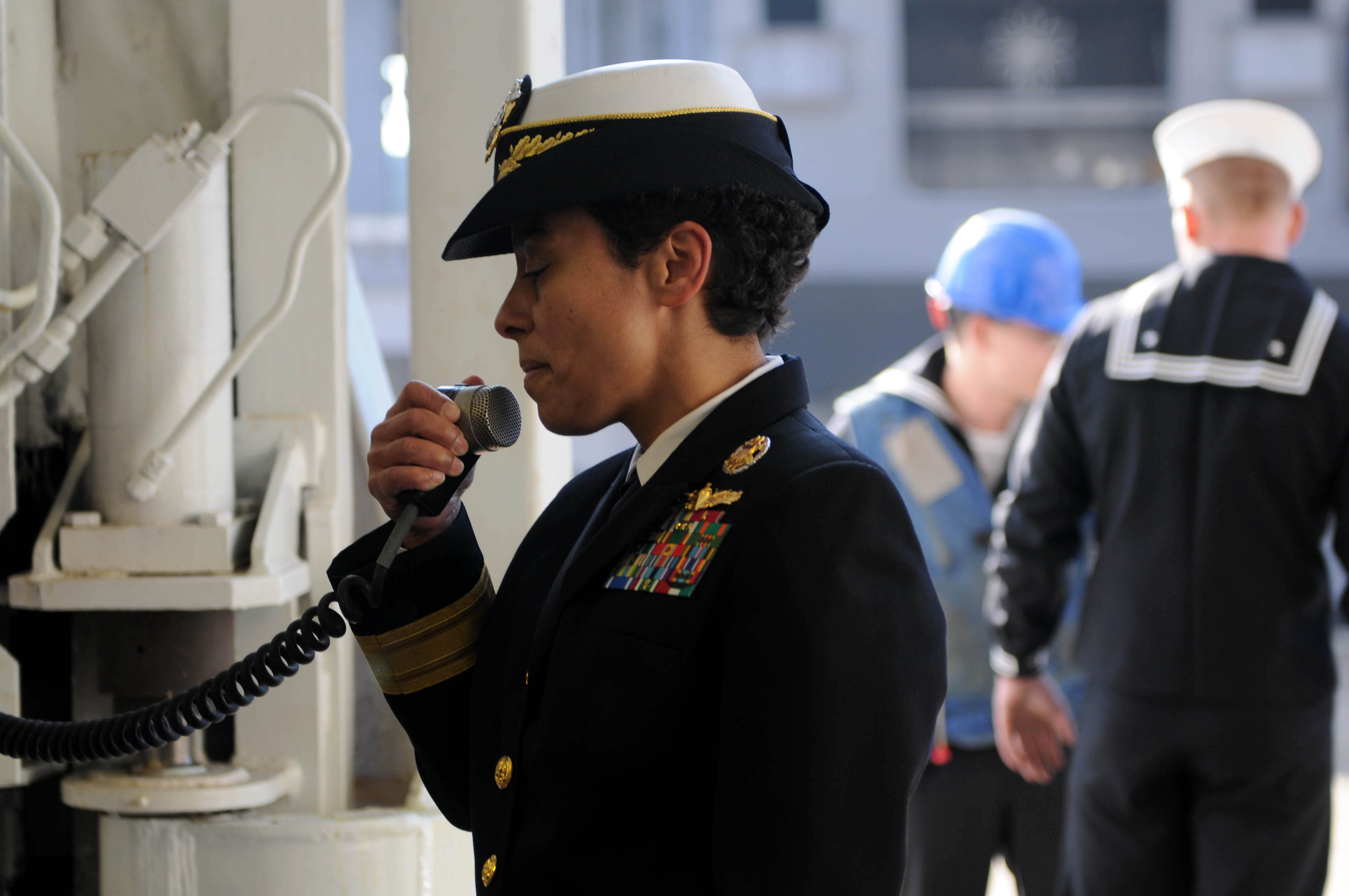
Then-Rear Admiral (lower half) Michelle J. Howard addresses the crew of USS Wasp (LHD-1).

General quarters
A call to general quarters aboard a United States Navy vessel

1 Main Circuit (1MC) is the shipboard public address circuits on United States Navy and United States Coast Guard vessels. This provides a means of transmitting general information and orders to all internal ship spaces and topside areas, and is loud enough that all embarked personnel are (normally) able to hear it. It is used to put out general information to the ship's crew on a regular basis each day. The system consists of an amplifier-oscillator group which is located in the IC/gyro room, a microphone control station, portable microphones at each control station and loudspeakers located throughout the ship. Control stations for the 1MC announcing system are located at the pilot house, OOD stations on the quarterdecks, aft steering and Damage Control Central area.

During an incident involving a casualty, the 1MC is a communication tool used by DCAs (damage control assistants) to keep ship members alerted and informed of casualty location area, status, and incident response efforts by the DC organization.

The 1MC is divided into smaller sub-circuits, such as officer's quarters and topside. At the option of the officer of the deck, some details are not passed on certain circuits.

The 1MC is also used for transmitting various alarm sounds to alert the crew of specific impending dangers such as an inbound anti-ship missile, chemical attack, collision, or a flight deck crash.

== Other circuits ==
- 2MC: Propulsion plant
- 3MC: Aviators
- 4MC: Damage control
- 5MC: Flight deck
- 6MC: Intership
- 7MC: Submarine control
- 8MC: Troop administration and control
- 9MC: Underwater troop communication
- 10MC: Well deck
- 18MC: Bridge
- 19MC: Aviation control
- 21MC: Captain's command
- 22MC: Electronic control
- 23MC: Electrical control
- 24MC: Flag command
- 26MC: Machinery control
- 27MC: Sonar and radar control
- 29MC: Sonar control and information
- 30MC: Special weapons
- 31MC: Escape trunk
- 32MC: Weapons control
- 35MC: Launcher captains
- 39MC: Cargo handling
- 40MC: Flag administrative
- 42MC: CIC coordinating
- 44MC: Instrumentation space
- 45MC: Research operations
- 46MC: Aviation ordnance and missile handling
- 47MC: Torpedo control
- 50MC: Integrated operational intelligence center
- 51MC: Aircraft maintenance and handling control
- 53MC: Ship administrative
- 54MC: Repair officer's control
- 55MC: Sonar service
- 58MC: Hangar-deck damage control
- 59MC: SAMID alert

== Usage examples ==
- General Quarters: "General Quarters, General Quarters! All hands man your battle stations. The flow of traffic is up and forward on the starboard side, down and aft on the port side. Set material condition [place material condition here] throughout the ship. This is [or "is not"] a drill." "General Quarters, General Quarters!", "Up and forward", etc., refer to the flow of foot traffic as personnel make their way to their stations; the directions given are standard on U.S. Navy and U.S. Coast Guard vessels. The reason for General Quarters is generally given (such as "Fire in Main Space 2").
- Sweepers: "Sweepers, Sweepers, man your brooms. Give the ship a clean sweep down both fore and aft! Sweep down all decks, ladders and passageways! Dump all garbage clear of the fantail! Sweepers." (Most ships today actually discourage throwing of trash over the side but instead use mulch/pulp rooms.) In port, "Dump all garbage clear of the fantail" is replaced with "Take all trash to the proper receptacles provided for on the pier."
- 8 O'Clock Reports: "Lay before the mast all eight o'clock reports. Eight o'clock reports will be taken by the Executive Officer in the Executive Officer's stateroom." When in port Eight O'Clock Reports are normally taken by the Command Duty Officer at a location of the CDO's choosing.
- Personnel Working Aloft: "There are personnel working aloft on board (ship), do not rotate, radiate, or energize any electric or electronic equipment, start gas turbines [or aboard submarines, "raise or lower any mast"], or operate ship's whistle while personnel are working aloft on board (ship)." Passed every thirty minutes and by all adjacent ships.
- Divers Over the Side: "There are divers over the side, do not rotate screws, cycle rudders, operate sonar, take suction from or discharge to the sea, blow, flood, or vent any tanks, or operate any underwater equipment without first contacting the Chief Engineer and the diving supervisor." (Passed every thirty minutes)
- Men in the Sail (RE: Submarine Tender craftsmen from the Repair Department R4 (Electrical/Electronic Repair) Division, ICs (Interior Communications Electricians)): "There are men working in the sail, do not raise or lower, rotate or radiate from any mast or antenna, there are men working in the sail." Passed every thirty minutes.
- Reveille: "Reveille! Reveille! Reveille! All hands heave out and trice up. Reveille!" (Trice up is a reference to the past when enlisted personnel slept in hammocks. One end was detached at reveille and both ends attached to the same bulkhead, making the space available for other use. Also, in the past reveille would generally include 'the smoking lamp is lit in all berthing spaces'.
- Tattoo: "Tattoo! Tattoo! Stand by for evening prayer. Silence about the decks." Given 5 minutes before Taps.
- Taps: "Taps! Taps! Lights Out. All hands turn in to their racks and maintain silence about the decks. Taps."
- Darken Ship: "Darken Ship! Make Darken Ship reports to DCS."
- Fire: A rapid ringing of the bell on the quarterdeck and then one, two, or three single strokes of the bell are sounded (one for the forward third of the ship, two for middle third, and three for the after third). Then "Fire, Fire, Fire, Class (A, B, C, or D) Fire in Compartment [Compartment Number and Nomenclature if known]. Away the [at sea fire party (generally called "Flying Squad"), IET (In-port Emergency Team), or ship's fire fighting team] provide from Repair 2 (or closest Repair Station not inside the fire boundary)"
- Breakaway music: Popular music played at the conclusion of an underway replenishment evolution. It is used to motivate the crew.
- Submarine diving: "Dive, dive." (followed by two klaxon blasts then) "Dive, dive."
- Security Alert: "Security Alert! Security Alert! Away the Security Alert team! Away the Back-up Alert force! All hands not involved in Security Alert stand fast! Reason for Security Alert: [state reason]"
- Flight Quarters: "Flight Quarters! Flight Quarters! Set condition 1-alpha for flight operations! Set condition 1-alpha for hoisting and lowering of boats, port boat davit! The smoking lamp is out aft of frame 1-2-niner; all personnel not involved in flight operations stay forward of frame 1-2-niner! All personnel remove soft hats and refrain from throwing FOD material over the side!"
- Testing shipwide alarm systems: "The following is a test of the ship's general, chemical, and collision alarms from the bridge --Disregard. [Test alarm sounds] Test complete, regard all further alarms!"
- Testing flight deck crash alarm system: "The following is a test of the flight deck crash alert, conducted from the pilothouse, helo control tower, helo control bubble - disregard. [Test alarm sounds] Test sat, test complete. Regard all further alarms!"
- Turn To; "Now Turn To" used to start the work day, usually at 08:00 and 13:00
- Knock Off All Ship's Work; End of the working day.
- Set Material Condition [condition]; Informs the crew on the correct default status for all watertight doors. Normal working hours would be X-ray, non-working hours would be Yoke and the tightest would be Zebra.
- Liberty Call; Those with permission may leave the ship. "Now liberty call, liberty call. Liberty commences for the port (starboard) section. Liberty expires on board 0800 tomorrow (... Monday) morning. Now liberty call."
- All announcements of an emergency nature are preceded with "Now this is (or is not) a drill".e.g. "Now this is a drill, this is a drill. Man overboard port side. All hands man your man overboard stations. This is a drill."
- The arrival and departure of the commanding officer and dignitaries is announced. " Chief of Naval Operations, arriving (departing)." The CO is referred to by the ship's name.

== In popular culture ==
- Crimson Tide, a 1995 submarine film, demonstrates in some detail the usage of the 1MC with regard to command instructions and ship-wide orders.
- Battlestar Galactica (2003): The series shows frequent use of the 1MC general address system aboard Galactica, most often to warn of an incoming attack. The most typical format for this warning resembles, "Action Stations! Action Stations! Set Condition One throughout the ship! This is not a drill!"
