= Frederick Moosbrugger =

U.S. Vice-Admiral WW II

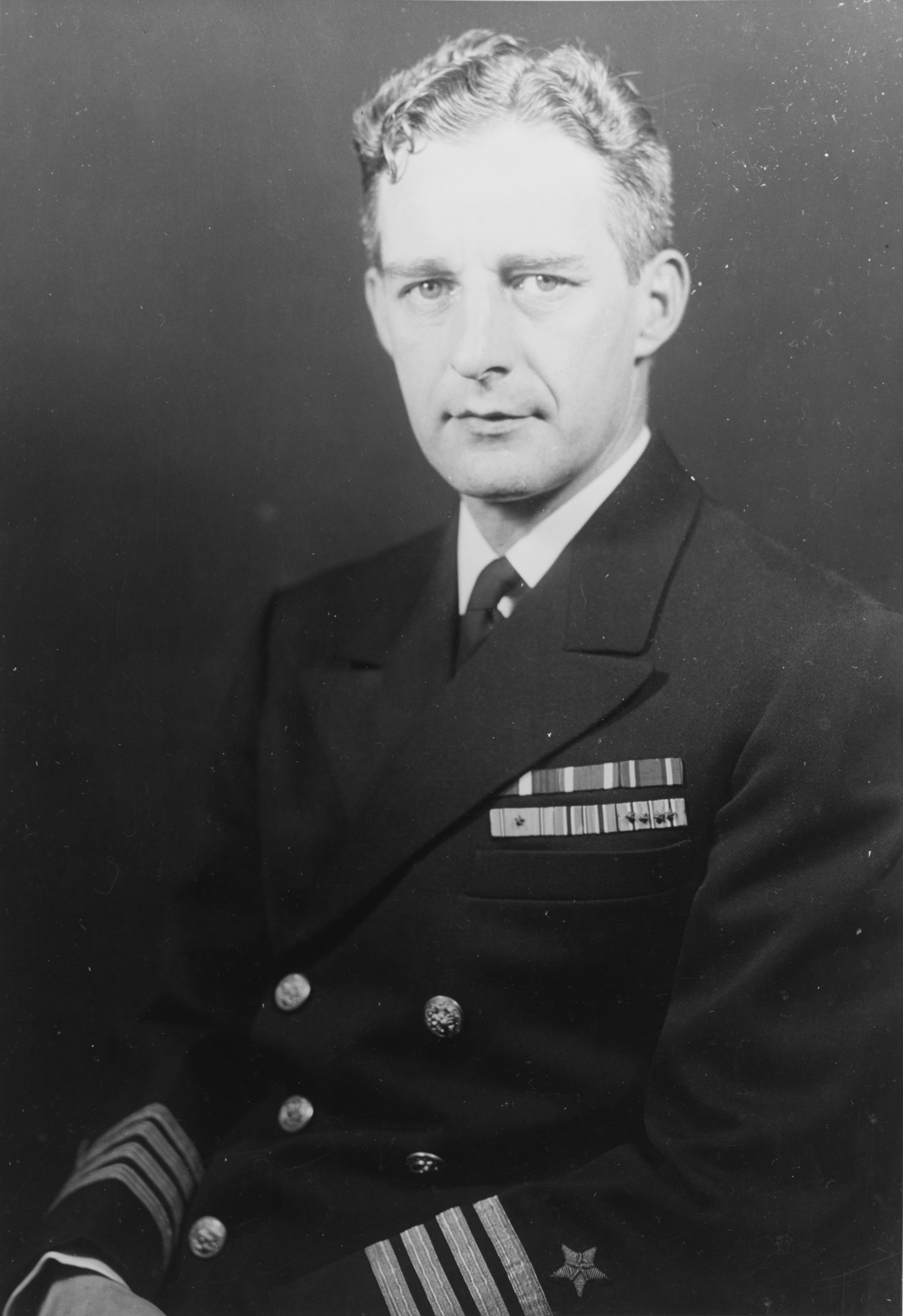
- Frederick Moosbrugger as a Navy Captain
- Born: October 9, 1900; Philadelphia, Pennsylvania
- Died: October 1, 1974 (aged 73); San Diego, California
- Burial place: Fort Rosecrans National Cemetery (Plot OS-187)
- Military career
- Allegiance: United States of America
- Branch: United States Navy
- Service years: 1923–1956
- Rank: Vice Admiral
- Nickname: "Moose"
- Units: USS Nevada (BB-36); USS Truxtun (DD-229); USS Brazos (AO-4); USS Houston (CA-30); USS Tennessee (BB-43)
- Commands: USS McCall (DD-400); Destroyer Division 11; Destroyer Division 12; USS Springfield (CL-66)
- Conflicts: World War II; Battle of Vella Gulf; Korean War
- Awards: Navy Cross; Navy Distinguished Service Medal; Legion of Merit

Frederick Moosbrugger (9 October 1900 – 1 October 1974) was an officer of the United States Navy eventually attaining the rank of vice admiral. He is best known for his service in World War II as a highly successful commander of destroyer squadrons.

== Early life ==
He was born in Philadelphia, Pennsylvania, the son of Jacob and Rosina (Maier Ritzer) Moosbrugger. He entered the United States Naval Academy at Annapolis, Maryland, on 25 June 1919. He graduated and commissioned as ensign on 8 June 1923.

== Military career ==
Following graduation from the Naval Academy in June 1923, he had sea duty for four years, first in the USS Nevada (BB-36), then in USS Truxtun (DD-229), operating in the valley of the Yangtze River, China in 1926 and 1927. He returned to the United States to serve briefly at Headquarters, 13th Naval District in May 1927.

He served aboard the USS Brazos (AO-4) from August 1927 to June 1929, after which he reported for submarine instruction. Completing the course in December 1929, he joined Submarine Division 12 for duty until April 1931 in the USS S-6 (SS-111). Returning to Annapolis as an instructor, he remained there for three years, then joined USS Houston (CA-30). He served aboard that cruiser from 1 June 1934 to 29 May 1937. He then reported for his second tour of duty at the U.S. Naval Academy, where he was an instructor in the Department of Ordnance and Gunnery.

Returning to duty afloat in June 1939, he joined the USS Tennessee (BB-43) as Gunnery Officer, and on 28 April 1941, assumed command of the USS McCall (DD-400). He was in command at the time of the Japanese attack on Pearl Harbor on 7 December 1941, and subsequently directed the activities of that destroyer in close cooperation with a carrier task group to cover the reinforcement of Samoa, to conduct raids on Wake Island and Minami Torishima, and to perform escort and screening duties in hazardous waters.

From May 1942 until September 1943, he had successive command of Destroyer Divisions 11 and 12, carrying out patrol and escort missions to Guadalcanal and the Russell Islands, supporting operations at New Georgia, Rendova, and Vangunu, and patrolling the Solomon Islands. He was in command during the smashing U.S. victory at the Battle of Vella Gulf in August 1943.

Returning to the United States, he assumed command on 5 April 1946, with the rank of captain, of the U.S. Naval School, General Line, Naval Base, Newport, Rhode Island. From June 1949 to January 1950, he commanded the USS Springfield (CL-66), after which he served as Commander Destroyer Flotilla One. On 1 June 1951, he was promoted to rear admiral, having temporarily served as a commodore from 6 April 1945 until 5 April 1946. In 1952, he became Commander Military Sea Transportation Service, Pacific Area, with headquarters in San Francisco, California.

In December 1952, he became superintendent of the U.S. Naval Postgraduate School, Monterey, California, and, in December 1955, reported as Commander Training Command, U.S. Pacific Fleet. He was transferred to the Retired List of the United States Navy on 1 October 1956, and was advanced to the rank of vice admiral.

Moosbrugger died October 1, 1974, in a San Diego hospital. He was married to Miss Dorothy E. Britt of Rydal, Pennsylvania, in January 1932. They had three sons, Frederick Britt Moosbrugger, Edward Arthur Moosbrugger and David B. Moosbrugger.

== Namesake ==
The United States Navy named the Spruance class destroyer USS Moosbrugger (DD-980) in his honor.

== Medals ==
In addition to the Navy Cross, the Distinguished Service Medal, the Legion of Merit with Combat "V," and the Commendation Ribbon, Moosbrugger received the Yangtze Service Medal, American Defense Service Medal, Fleet Clasp, the American Campaign Medal, Asiatic-Pacific Campaign Medal, the World War II Victory Medal, the Philippine Liberation Ribbon, the Navy Occupation Service Medal, Asia Clasp, the National Defense Service Medal, the Korean Service Medal, and the United Nations Service Medal.

	Navy Cross	Navy Distinguished Service Medal	
Legion of Merit w/ valor device	Navy and Marine Corps Commendation Medal	Yangtze Service Medal	American Defense Service Medal with Fleet Clasp
American Campaign Medal	Asiatic-Pacific Campaign Medal w/ 1 silver star	World War II Victory Medal	Philippine Liberation Medal
Navy Occupation Service Medal with Asia Clasp	National Defense Service Medal	Korean Service Medal	United Nations Service Medal for Korea
