= USS Moosbrugger =

Spruance-class destroyer

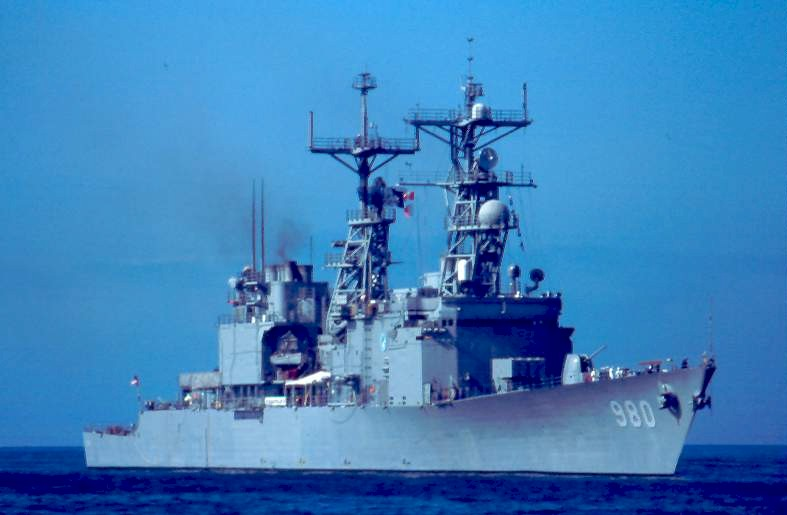
- USS Moosbrugger

History

United States
- Name: Moosbrugger
- Namesake: Frederick Moosbrugger
- Ordered: 15 January 1974
- Builder: Ingalls Shipbuilding
- Laid down: 3 November 1975
- Launched: 23 July 1977
- Acquired: 27 November 1978
- Commissioned: 16 December 1978
- Decommissioned: 15 December 2000
- Stricken: 25 April 2006
- Identification: Callsign: NCWA; Hull number: DD-980
- Motto: More Than Required
- Nickname(s): The Moose
- Fate: Scrapped, 2006
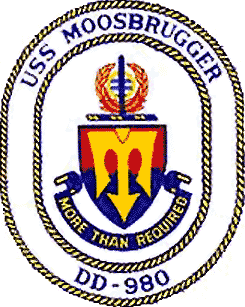
- Badge

General characteristics
- Class & type: Spruance-class destroyer
- Displacement: 8,040 long tons (8,170 t) full load
- Length: 529 ft (161 m) waterline; 563 ft (172 m) overall
- Beam: 55 ft (17 m)
- Draft: 29 ft (8.8 m)
- Installed power: 3 × 501-K17 generator sets (2,000 kW (2,700 hp) each)
- Propulsion: 4 × General Electric LM2500 gas turbines, 2 shafts, 80,000 shp (60 MW)
- Speed: 32.5 knots (60.2 km/h; 37.4 mph)
- Range: 6,000 nmi (11,000 km; 6,900 mi) at 20 knots (37 km/h; 23 mph)
- Complement: 19 officers, 315 enlisted
- Sensors & processing systems: AN/SPS-40 air search radar; AN/SPG-60 fire control radar; AN/SPS-55 surface search radar; AN/SPQ-9 gun fire control radar; Mark 23 TAS automatic detection and tracking radar; AN/SPS-65 missile fire control radar; AN/SQS-53 bow-mounted active sonar; AN/SQR-19 TACTAS towed array passive sonar; Naval Tactical Data System
- Electronic warfare & decoys: AN/SLQ-32 electronic warfare system; AN/SLQ-25 Nixie torpedo countermeasures; Mark 36 SRBOC decoy launching system; AN/SLQ-49 inflatable decoys
- Armament: 2 × 5 in (127 mm) 54 caliber Mark 45 dual purpose guns; 2 × 20 mm Phalanx CIWS Mark 15 guns; 1 × 8 cell ASROC launcher (removed); 1 × 8 cell NATO Sea Sparrow Mark 29 missile launcher; 2 × quadruple Harpoon missile canisters; 2 × Mark 32 triple 12.75 in (324 mm) torpedo tubes (Mk 46 torpedoes); 1 × 61 cell Mk 41 VLS launcher for Tomahawk missiles
- Aircraft carried: 2 × Sikorsky SH-60 Seahawk LAMPS III helicopters
- Aviation facilities: Flight deck and enclosed hangar for up to two medium-lift helicopters

USS Moosbrugger (DD-980) was a Spruance-class destroyer built for the United States Navy by the Ingalls Shipbuilding Division of Litton Industries at Pascagoula, Mississippi. Affectionately nicknamed the "Moose" by her crews, she was named in honor of Vice Admiral Frederick Moosbrugger who is best known for his service in World War II as a highly successful commander of destroyer squadrons.

== History ==
USS Moosbrugger was laid down 3 November 1975, launched 23 July 1977 and commissioned 16 December 1978. She arrived at her new home port at Charleston, South Carolina just prior to Christmas 1978 becoming the first of her class at that base. She conducted shakedown operations at Fleet Training Center, Guantanamo Bay, Cuba. She visited Port-au-Prince, Haiti, and Saint Thomas, United States Virgin Islands during this time.

Following shakedown, USS Moosbrugger returned to her builders for post-commissioning refits and upgrades. While at Pascagoula, she was ordered to conduct an emergency sortie in order to avoid the worst effects of Hurricane Frederic, spending several days in the Gulf of Mexico while the storm system passed. Following her return to port, Moosbrugger supplied electrical power to portions of the shipyard to allow her refit to complete. It was in this refit that a pair of moose antlers were installed on the ship, just below the bridge windows.

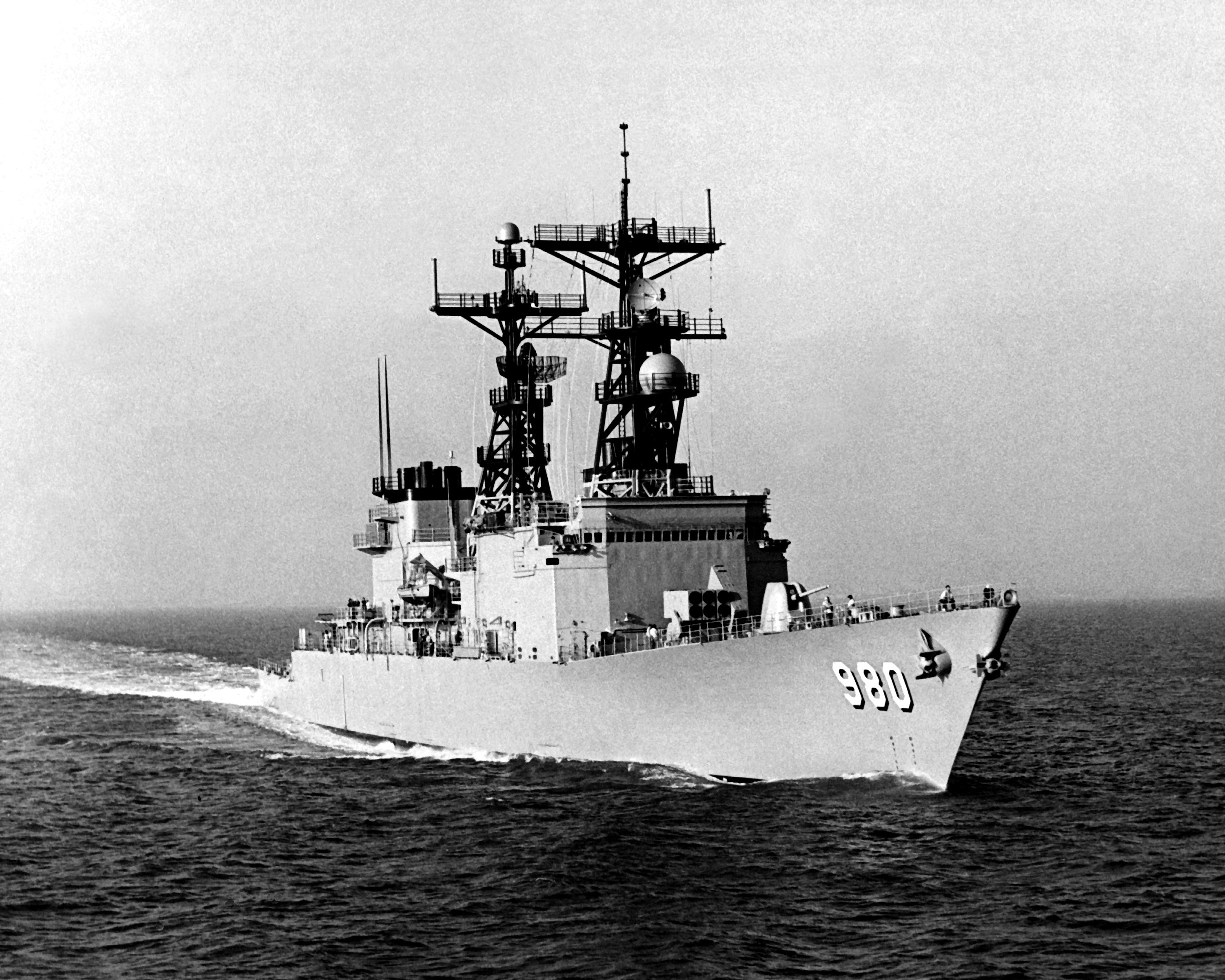
USS Moosbrugger in 1982

Moosbrugger deployed to the Mediterranean Sea on 14 July 1980, acting as flagship for Commander, Destroyer Squadron 20 for the entire deployment. She conducted anti-submarine warfare (ASW) and amphibious support operations during the deployment. Port visits included Rota, Spain, Naples, Italy, Cagliari, Italy, La Spezia, Italy, Marseille, France, Benidorm, Spain, Cartagena, Spain and Palma de Mallorca. She returned from this deployment on 11 December 1980. She was the test platform for the AN/SQR 19(V) tactical towed array sonar (TACTAS) in 1982.

Moosbrugger received the Meritorious Unit Commendation (MUC) for service as set forth in the following citation:

"For meritorious service in naval operations from 13 September 1986 to 1 December 1986. During numerous ASW operations against Soviet submarines in the Mediterranean Sea, the officers and crew members of the USS Moosbrugger displayed great professional skill and exemplary tactical proficiency attaining Commander Sixth Fleet ASW objectives. USS Moosbrugger, equipped with the SQR-19 towed array sonar and MK III Light Airborne Multi-Purpose System, aggressively achieved unprecedented success in the detection, long term tracking and classification of Soviet submarines. In addition, through expert coordination of multiple ASW assets of the United States and Allied Navies, she was the key to exceptionally competent ASW operations. By her outstanding performance, USS Moosbrugger greatly enhanced national, bilateral, and NATO's ASW capabilities. USS Moosbrugger set a new standard of Mediterranean surface-ship ASW excellence that will be the bench mark for other submarine hunters. By their steadfast performance, brilliant and creative use of resources, exceptional combat readiness, and unfailing devotion to duty, the officers and enlisted personnel of USS Moosbrugger reflected great credit upon themselves and upheld the highest traditions of the United States Naval Service." Signed by the Secretary of the Navy John Lehman.

In 1989, Moosbrugger made the final Cold War deployment to the United States Sixth Fleet as the primary ASW element of the USS Theodore Roosevelt Battle Group.

=== 1990s ===
In August 1990, USS Moosbrugger was part of the initial United States response to Saddam Hussein's invasion of Kuwait. She deployed on six days notice for Operation Desert Shield to join the rapidly formed USS John F. Kennedy Battle Group. She deployed from Charleston, South Carolina and joined John F. Kennedy en route to the Red Sea via the Mediterranean Sixth Fleet. In the months of coalition build-up prior to the beginning of hostilities, the Moosbrugger performed several important tasks. She was first tasked to delay her Suez transit by several weeks in order to be the US contribution to the standing up of NATO's Standing Naval Force Mediterranean making port calls in Italy and Balearic Islands. Completing her short stay with NATO, Moosbrugger transited the Suez in early September to rejoin Kennedy and immediately took a station in the North Red Sea entrance to the Gulf of Aqaba tasked with visit, board, search, and seizure (VBSS) to support enforcement of UN Iraq Sanctions. In September and early October she stopped and boarded nearly 30 merchant ships bound for Jordan. Following a short maintenance period in Jidda, Saudi Arabia, she took onboard small contingents of U.S. Coast Guard personnel and Navy SEALS, both trained in VBSS and continued search and seizure operations until transiting back North through the Suez. Moosbrugger spent Christmas 1990 in Haifa, Israel, departing the following day back to the Suez Canal and Red Sea.

When Operation Desert Storm began in January 1991, Moosbrugger was again assigned maritime interdiction patrol at the entrance to the Gulf of Aqaba. Her assignment was to stop, board, and search merchant vessels flagged by nations sympathetic to Iraq; and to prevent any war materials found onboard from reaching Jordan and ultimately Iraq. When hostilities ceased, Moosbrugger made ports-of-call in Egypt, Crete, and Gibraltar before crossing the Atlantic for the United States. Moosbrugger was awarded the Navy Unit Commendation for service during the Persian Gulf War.

Moosbrugger performed an extensive update in Charleston shipyard which removed its forward anti-submarine missile launcher of the ASROC family and upgraded to the RUM-139 VL-ASROC vertical launching system (VLS). This allowed the ship the ability to fire Tomahawk missiles in addition to vertically launched ASROC.

Moosbrugger relocated to Mayport, Florida, on 11 March 1995, from its previous home port of Charleston, South Carolina. The Spruance-class ship was the sixth of eleven ships scheduled for relocation to Mayport as a result of the 1993 Base Realignment and Closure Commission decision.

Moosbrugger went into drydock to install women's living quarters and restrooms. She was one of the first surface warships to have women on it.

The yard period in Mayport Florida was also to repair extensive issues encountered during the overhaul and upgrades performed at the Earl Shipyard in Charleston just a few years prior to.

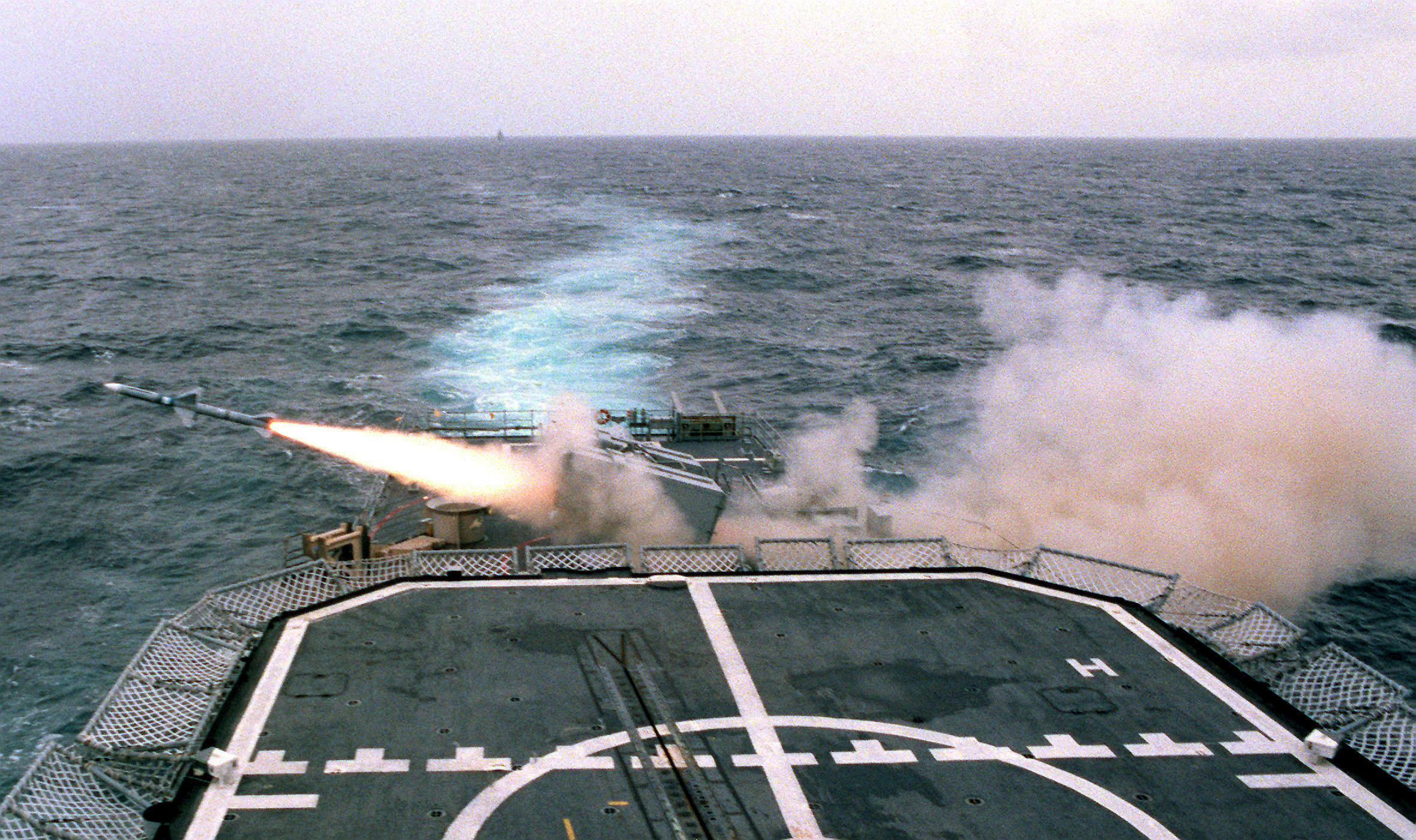
USS Moosbrugger launches a Sea Sparrow missile on 15 July 1996

Following these extensive overhaul periods, Moosbrugger deployed in 1996, along with La Moure County, John L. Hall and Narwhal, to take part in UNITAS 96, a series of combined tactical at-sea operations, amphibious operations and in-port exercises with participating South American naval forces. During that deployment, Moosbrugger spent almost two weeks in Venezuelan waters conducting anti-submarine warfare, electronic warfare and anti-air gunnery exercises in the Caribbean Sea. She then departed for Brazil for the next phase of UNITAS.

Moosbrugger deployed in 1998, along with La Moure County, Doyle and Boston, to take part in UNITAS 39–98, serving as the USCOMSOLANT flagship with COMDESRON 32 as the Operational Commander. UNITAS, Latin for unity, consists of at-sea operations, amphibious operations, riverine operations and in port exercises conducted with nine South American navies over a four-month period. The U.S. task group circumnavigated South America in a clockwise direction, returning to Naval Station Roosevelt Roads in November. The 40-year-old operation promotes a cooperative maritime strategy in the region while supporting the U.S. policy of continued engagement in South America through forward presence. The navies of Canada, United Kingdom, the Netherlands and South Africa joined the United States and South American navies for the first phase of UNITAS. This phase was led by the United States and conducted in the vicinity of Puerto Rico. The U.S. Navy's longest-running annual deployment began at Naval Station Roosevelt Roads, Puerto Rico, as seven ships from four foreign navies joined a five ship U.S. task group.

While in Puerto Rico, on 20 April 1998, Moosbrugger took part in Independent Deployer Exercise (INDEX) 98–2, off the coast of Puerto Rico. During the exercise, Moosbrugger fired two Sea Sparrows from her deck at guided target drones launched from the Atlantic Fleet Weapons Training Facility at Naval Station Roosevelt Roads. The exercise also included target drones fired from A-4 Skyhawk aircraft. Following this, the task force then headed for Venezuela on 18 July as Venezuela, Brazil, Uruguay, Argentina, Chile, Paraguay, Peru, Ecuador, and Colombia each directed, in turn, their own phase of UNITAS. Overall, U.S. forces worked with host navies from Venezuela, Brazil, Uruguay, Argentina, Paraguay, Chile, Peru, Ecuador and Colombia. The specific exercises conducted in each phase are determined by the host navy, making each phase unique. Exercises included all areas of modern naval warfare including anti-air, amphibious, anti-surface and anti-submarine warfare.

=== Fate ===
Moosbrugger was placed in commission, in reserve on 16 October 2000 at Mayport, Florida to prepare for decommissioning. On 15 December 2000, she was decommissioned and subsequently brought to Philadelphia Naval Intermediate Ship Maintenance Facility. She was maintained there in Maintenance Category B for activation in time of national emergency until 2006, when she was towed to Brownsville, Texas, for dismantling.

== Ship's crest ==
The official crest of USS Moosbrugger symbolizes the dedication and courage displayed by her namesake, Vice Admiral Frederick Moosbrugger, during World War II.

The trident, an attribute of Neptune, god of the seas, represents the awesome strength and dominance of the modern destroyer. It also resembles the letter "M," an allusion to the initial letter of Moosbrugger, the ship's namesake. The ship's motto is "More than Required".

Through the heraldic fountain for water, the grappling iron (a device used for close range, early naval encounters), and the torpedo, the crest commemorates the Battle of Vella Gulf in the South Pacific during World War II. The then-Commander Moosbrugger led his ships into exceedingly close range against Japanese naval forces; took the enemy by surprise, and delivered a devastating torpedo attack, thereby annihilating the hostile force. For this action, he was awarded the Navy Cross. The gold laurel wreath is symbolic of Vice Admiral Frederick Moosbrugger's long and distinguished career.

== Gallery ==
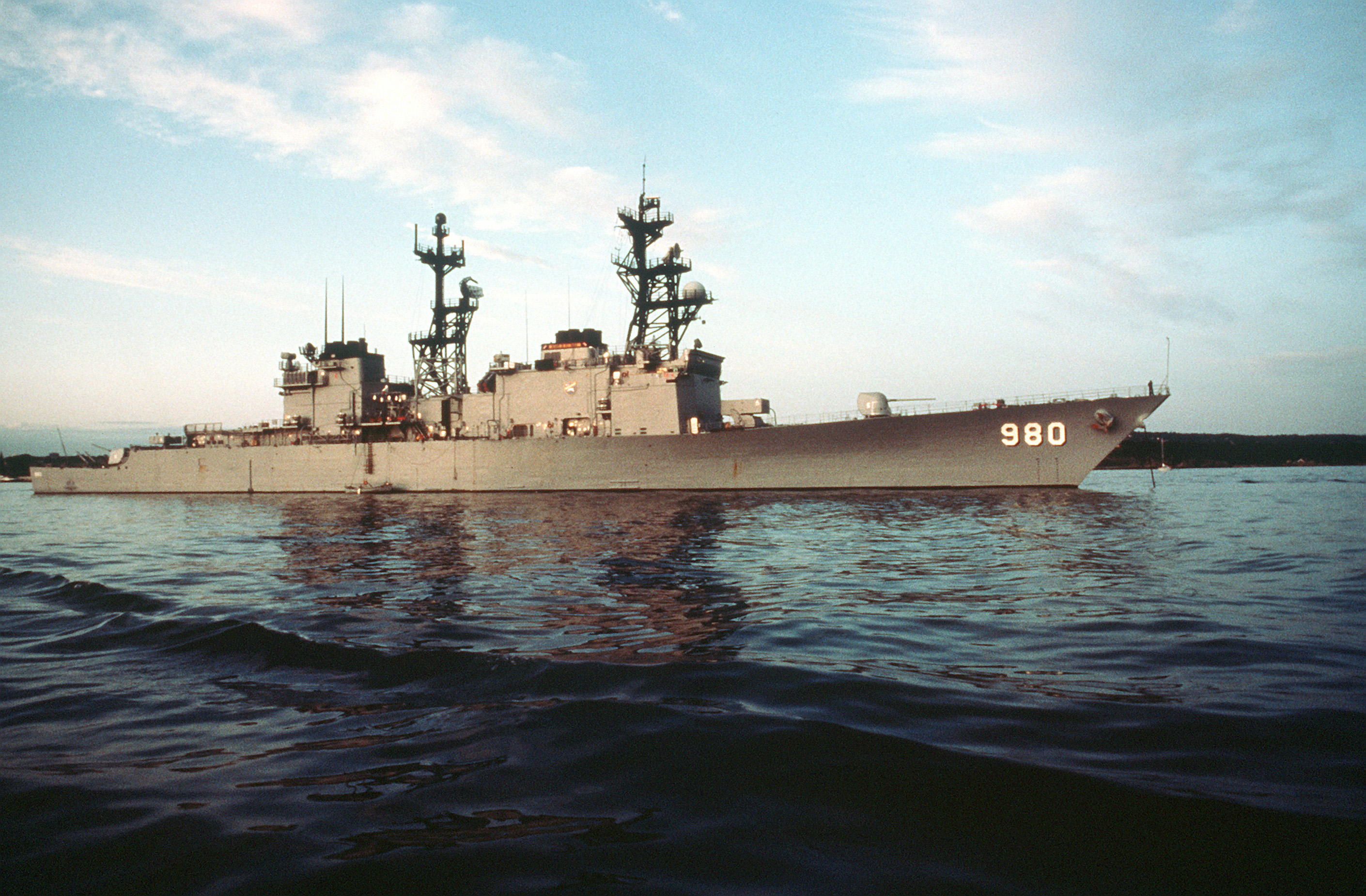
USS Moosbrugger on 1 July 1983

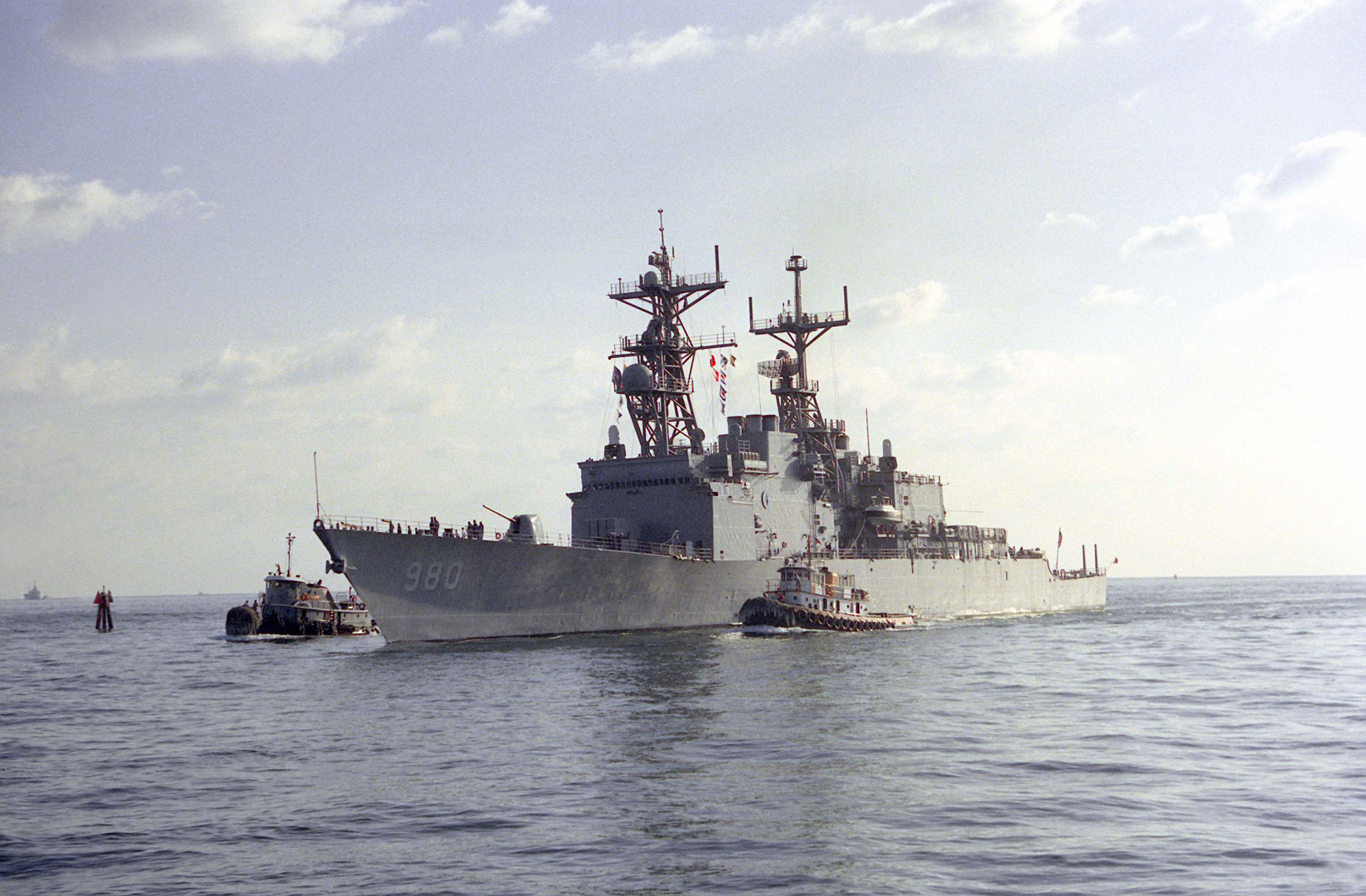
USS Moosbrugger in Port Everglades on 2 March 1992

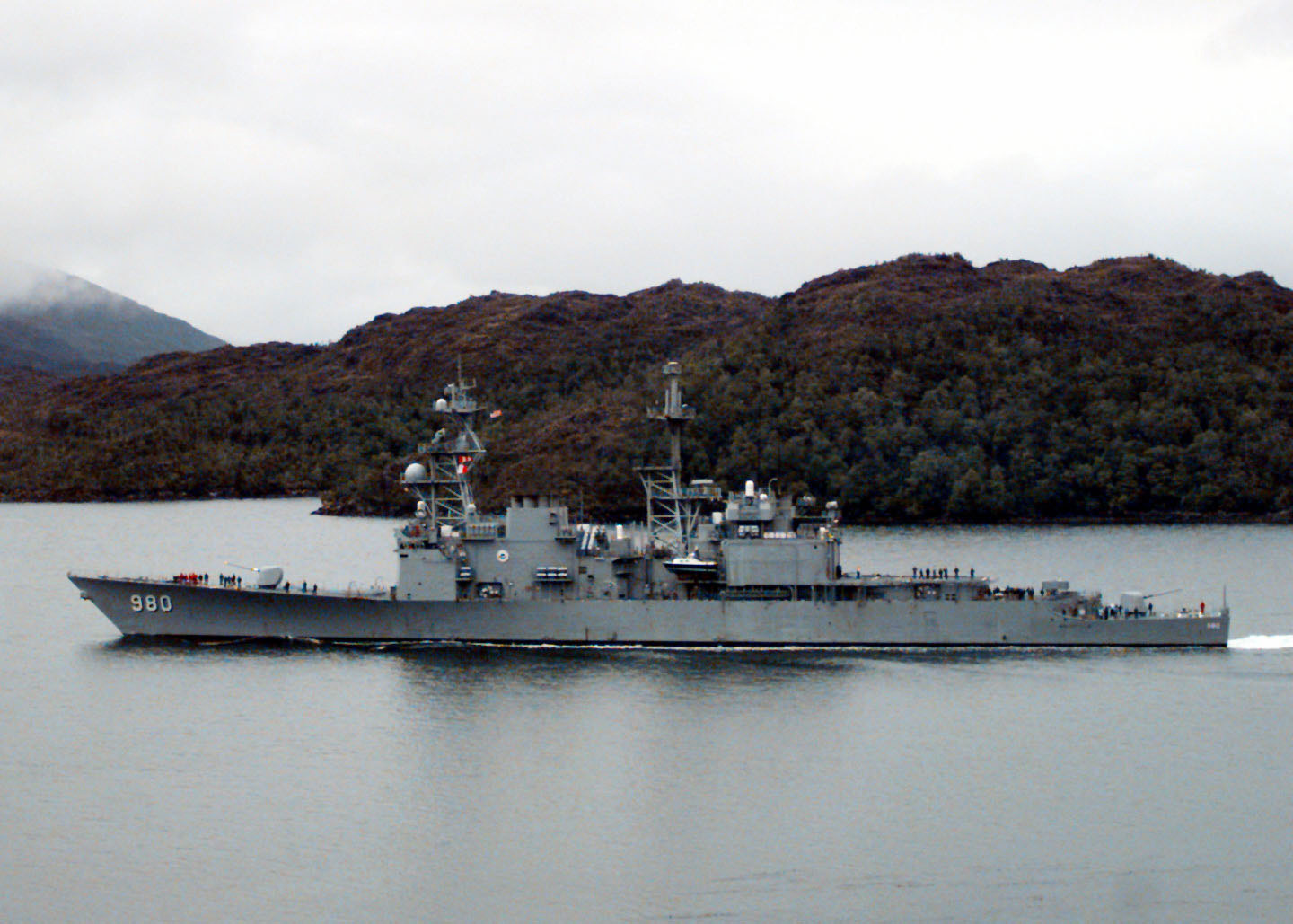
USS Moosbrugger on 18 September 1996

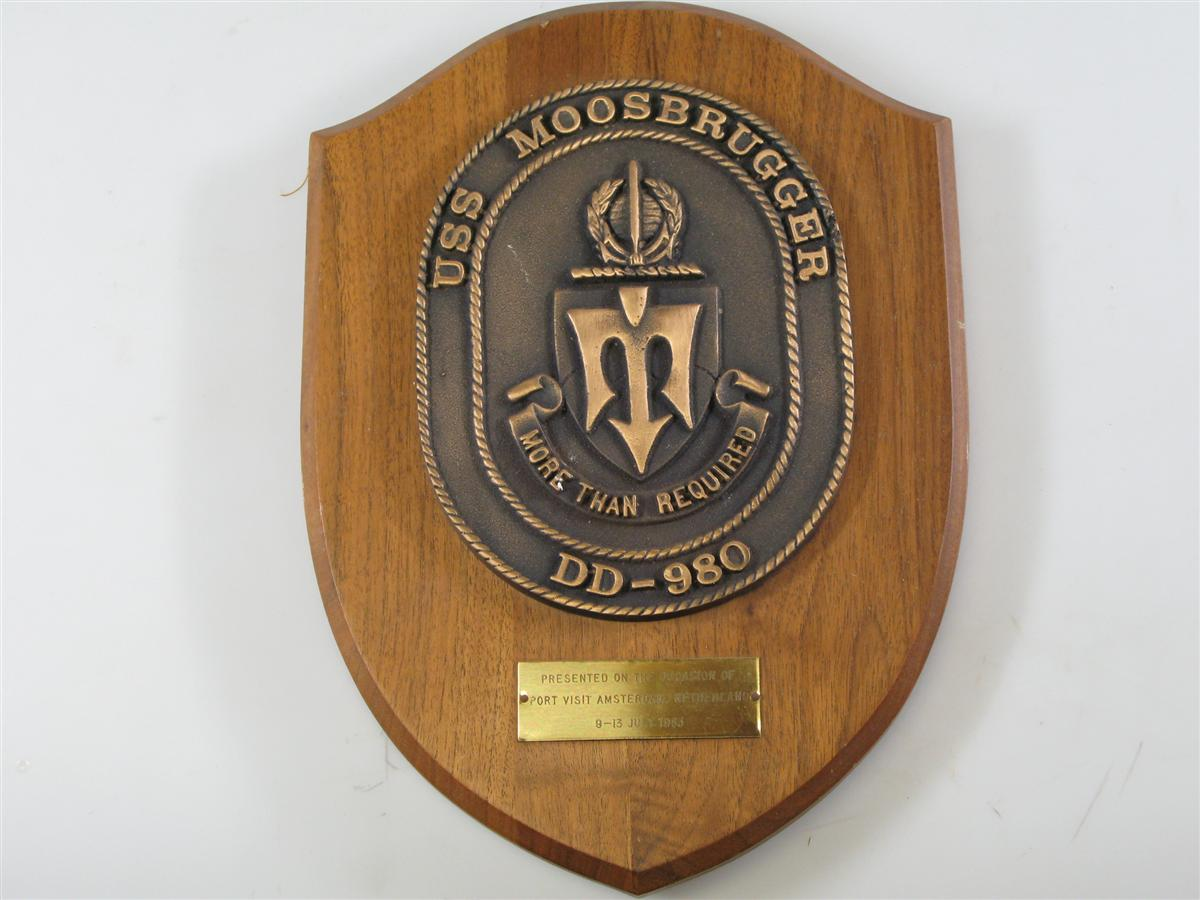
USS Moosbrugger's nameplate

== See also ==
- List of destroyers of the United States Navy
