= USS Kanawha (AO-1) =

Oiler of the United States Navy

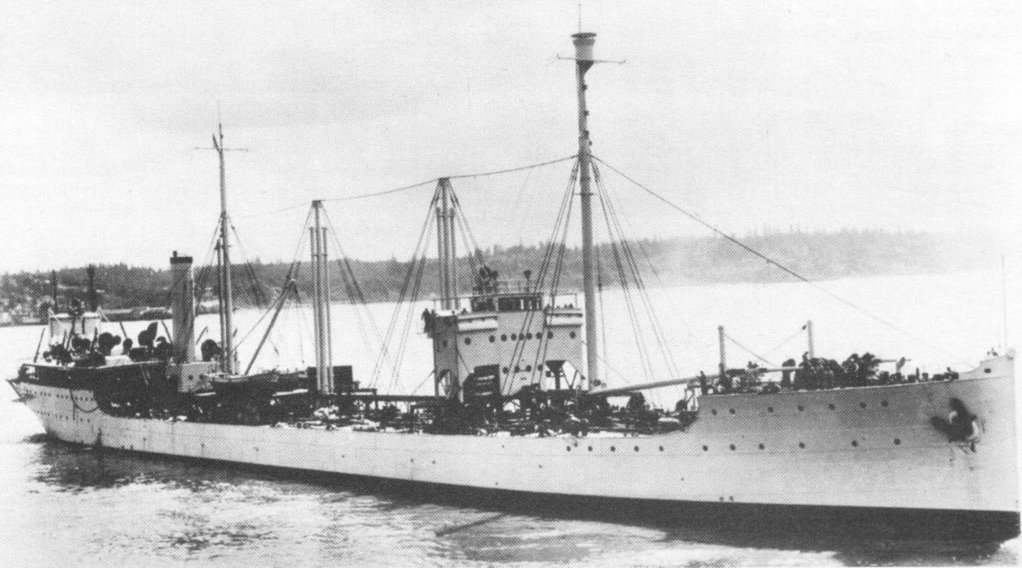
- USS Kanawha (AO-1)

History

United States
- Name: USS Kanawha
- Namesake: Kanawha River in West Virginia
- Laid down: 8 December 1913
- Launched: 11 July 1914
- Commissioned: 5 June 1915; 5 June 1934
- Decommissioned: 18 December 1929
- Stricken: 19 May 1943
- Honors and awards: World War I Victory Medal (with Transport clasp) - American Defense Service Medal (with Fleet clasp)/American Campaign Medal - Asiatic-Pacific Campaign Medal (1) - World War II Victory Medal
- Fate: Sunk on 8 April 1943 by Japanese aircraft off Tulagi, Solomon Islands

General characteristics
- Class & type: Kanawha-class fleet replenishment oiler
- Displacement: 5,723 tons light; 14,800 tons full load
- Length: 475 ft 7 in (144.96 m)
- Beam: 56 ft 3 in (17.15 m)
- Draft: 26 ft 8 in (8.13 m)
- Speed: 14 knots
- Complement: 317 officers and enlisted
- Armament: 2 × 5 in (130 mm)/38 caliber guns; 2 × twin 40-mm. guns; 2 × twin 20-mm. guns

USS Kanawha (AO–1) was the lead ship of her class of replenishment oilers of the United States Navy. She was commissioned in 1915 and sunk on 8 April 1943 by Japanese aircraft off Tulagi, Solomon Islands.

== Operational history ==
USS Kanawha (AO-1) (originally Fuel Ship No. 13) was the first purpose-built oiler of the US Navy. She was laid down 8 December 1913 by the Mare Island Navy Yard, Vallejo, California; launched 11 July 1914; sponsored by Miss Dorothy Bennett; and commissioned 5 June 1915.

Kanawha cleared San Diego 9 June 1915 and arrived Newport, Rhode Island, for service with the Atlantic Fleet. During the following year the oiler made seven trips to Port Arthur, Texas, for fuel oil and gasoline. On 11 October 1916 Kanawha was assigned to the Atlantic Fleet. Then, in addition to her fueling duties, she participated in tactical exercises, carried mail, and towed targets.

=== World War I ===
After the United States entered World War I on 6 April 1917, the oiler was assigned to Commander, Destroyer Force, Atlantic Fleet, as an escort for the first A.E.F. sent to France. Kanawha cleared New York 15 June 1917 as part of Group IV (the slowest group of ships in the first convoys) and crossed the Atlantic, arriving St. Nazaire 2 July. She returned to New York 10 August for repairs before sailing again 23 September. The oiler cruised in Atlantic waters until 1 November supplying fuel oil to the cruiser force and escorting convoys to Europe. Kanawha returned to Philadelphia for repairs, then joined the Naval Overseas Transportation Service (NOTS) on 8 January 1918. For the rest of the war, the oiler, ignoring torpedo warnings, carried fuel oil from Halifax to United Kingdom and French ports. On 6 November 1918, the patrol vessel USS Jolly Roger suffered irreparable damage while being loaded onto the deck of the Kanawha.

=== Interwar years ===
Kanawha arrived New York 1 May 1919 from her final cruise; she was detached from NOTS 12 May for reassignment to the Atlantic Fleet.

The oiler departed Port Arthur 24 July and arrived at San Pedro, California 9 August. From 1919 to 1929, Kanawha, with the exception of three cruises to Port Arthur to supply units and ports along the Atlantic coast, operated in the Pacific. In addition to servicing ships, the oiler participated in the Army-Navy maneuvers in Hawaii during April 1925. She then accompanied the Battle Fleet on a goodwill cruise to Australia and New Zealand before resuming coastal fueling operations 25 September 1925. Kanawha was decommissioned at Puget Sound Naval Shipyard 18 December 1929.

She was recommissioned 5 June 1934 and cleared Bremerton 21 June for her base at San Pedro. For the following six years she cruised along the United States West Coast supplying oil and gasoline to ports in the Panama Canal Zone, the Caribbean, and Hawaii. In 1941 Kanawha widened her operations, sailing east to Midway and Wake Islands and as far north as Alaska. The oiler was at Mare Island undergoing overhaul at the time of the Japanese attack on Pearl Harbor.

=== World War II ===
Kanawha departed San Pedro 21 March 1942 with a convoy loaded with supplies for Hawaii. She continued convoy runs from California to Pearl Harbor until 18 May when she arrived Tongatapu for fueling operations in the South Pacific. Throughout the summer she cruised to New Caledonia, Espiritu Santo, and Efate, providing fuel for destroyers and transports en route to the Pacific campaigns. The oiler departed Pago Pago 12 October and put into San Francisco 29 October for repairs and overhaul.

Kanawha resumed fueling operations upon her return to Pago Pago 13 February 1943. For the next two months she serviced ships engaged in the struggle in the Solomon Islands.

On 7 April a group of Japanese Vals slipped through fighter defenses and zeroed in on Kanawha as she awaited an escort in Tulagi harbor. At 1502, shortly after clearing the harbor, the slow and vulnerable oiler came under bomb attack. One of the first five planes hit an oil tank under the bridge, causing fires to spread rapidly along the deck. Lt. Comdr. Bock ordered the ship abandoned to minimize danger to his crew from burning oil on the surface. After rescue operations were underway, volunteers returned on board and extinguished fires amidst exploding ammunition. The tug Rail towed Kanawha to the west side of Tulagi where she was beached shortly before midnight. However, she slid off into deep water and sank before daybreak 8 April. Nineteen of her crew were lost.

Kanawha received one battle star for World War II service.
