= USS Maumee (AO-2) =

Former US navy ship

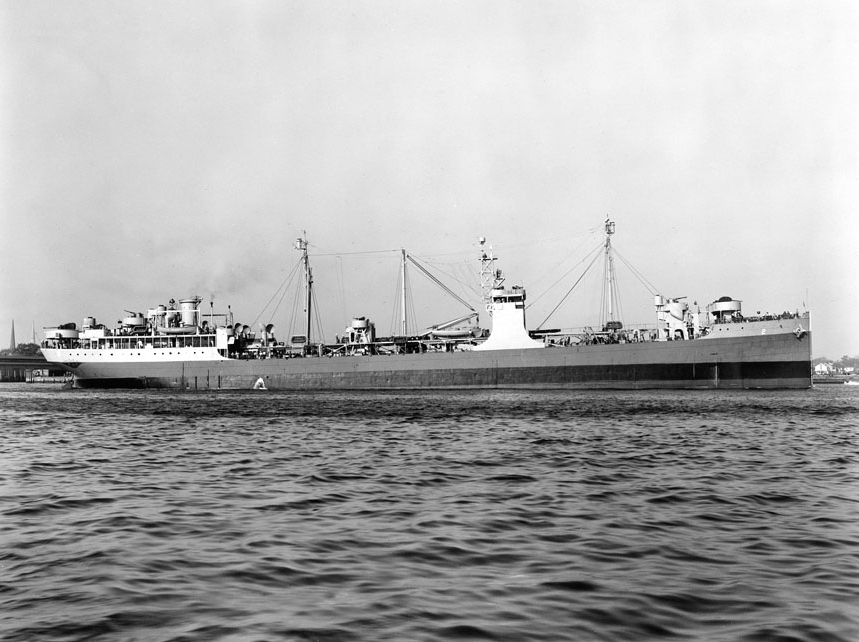

History

United States
- Name: USS Maumee (AO-2)
- Namesake: Maumee River
- Builder: Mare Island Naval Shipyard
- Laid down: 23 July 1914
- Launched: 17 April 1915
- Commissioned: 20 October 1916
- Decommissioned: 5 November 1946
- Fate: transferred to the Republic of China, 5 November 1946
- Stricken: 12 March 1948

History

Taiwan
- Name: ROCS Omei (AO-309)
- Acquired: 5 November 1946
- Commissioned: 5 November 1946
- Decommissioned: 1967
- Stricken: 1967
- Fate: Scrapped

General characteristics
- Class & type: Kanawha-class fleet replenishment oiler
- Displacement: 14,500
- Length: 475 ft 7 in (144.96 m)
- Beam: 56 ft 2 in (17.12 m)
- Draft: 26 ft 6 in (8.08 m)
- Speed: 14 kn (26 km/h)
- Complement: 475
- Armament: 4 × 4" guns

The second USS Maumee (AO-2) was laid down as Fuel Ship No. 14 on 23 July 1914 by Navy Shipyard, Mare Island, Calif.; launched 17 April 1915; sponsored by Miss Janet Crose; and commissioned 20 October 1916. When the Navy's ship classifications were introduced 17 July 1920, Maumee was designated AO-2.

== Design ==
Maumee was the first surface ship in the U.S. Navy to be powered by diesel engines. Supervising their installation and operation was her Executive and Chief Engineering Officer, Lt. Chester W. Nimitz. To be fitted with the engines after it was built, the ship was towed all the way from Union Iron Works in San Francisco to the Brooklyn Navy Yard. As of January, 1919 she had two 3,600 h.p. diesel engines running at 125 rpm.

== Early career ==
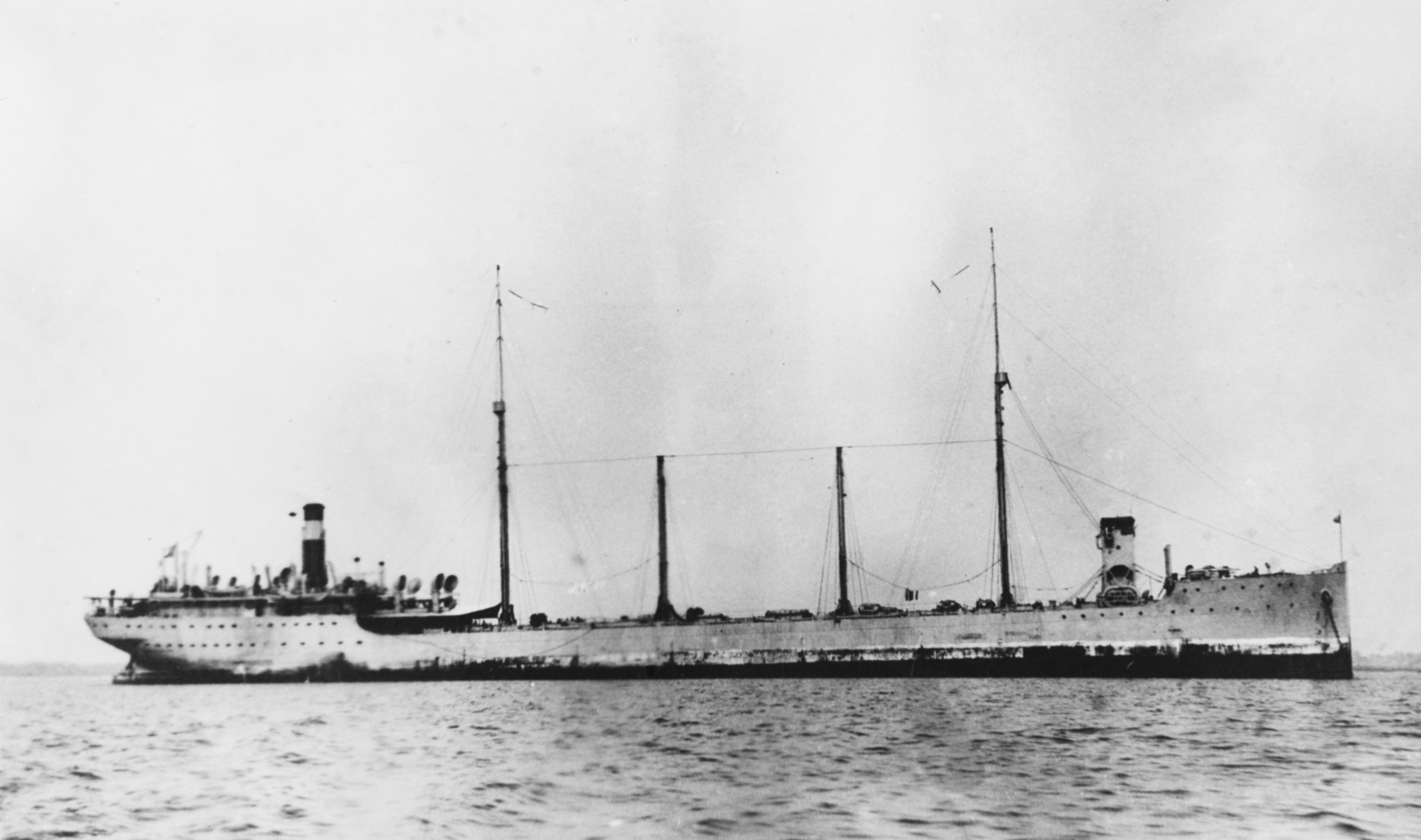
Maumee in her original configuration with the bridge forward.

Prior to the entry of the United States into World War I, Maumee operated off the east coast and Cuba. Following the declaration of war, 6 April 1917, she was assigned duty refueling at sea the destroyers being sent to Britain. Stationed about 300 miles south of Greenland, Maumee was ready for the second group of U.S. ships to be sent as they closed her 28 May. With the fueling of those six destroyers, Maumee pioneered the Navy's underway refueling operations, thus establishing a pattern of mobile logistic support which would enable the Navy to keep its fleets at sea for extended periods, with a far greater range independent of the availability of a friendly port. This independence proved crucial to victory in World War II by the ships commanded by Fleet Admiral Nimitz who as Maumee's executive officer had played a key role in the refueling developments.

By 5 July Maumee had refueled 34 Ireland‑bound destroyers in mid‑Atlantic. During the remainder of the war she completed two further ocean crossings to Europe where she refueled naval units attached to the American Expeditionary Force. Following the end of the war, Maumee operated off the east coast until decommissioning 9 June 1922 for layup in reserve at Philadelphia.

== World War II ==
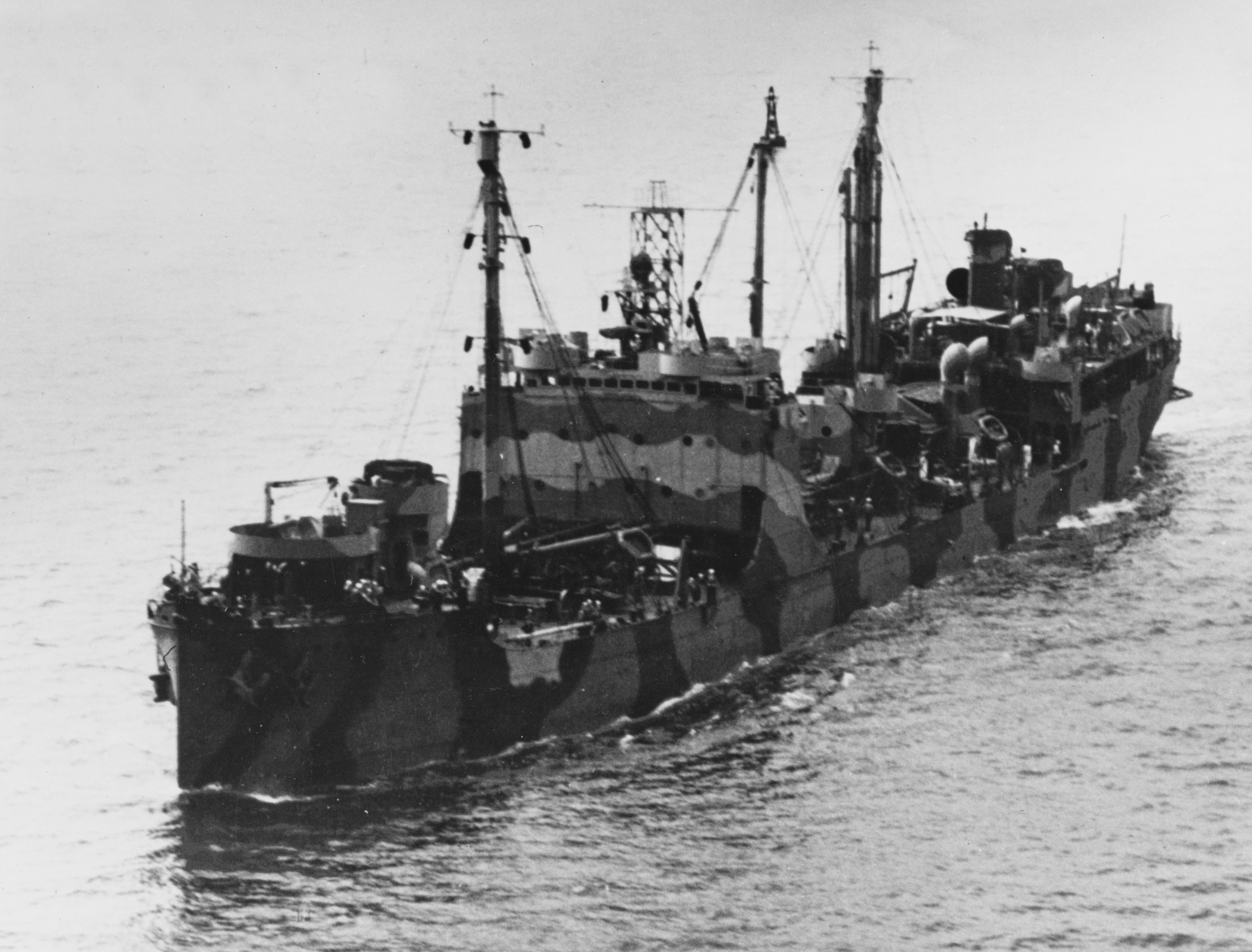
USS Maumee in 1942.

With the opening of hostilities in Europe, Maumee was brought out of reserve, given an extensive overhaul at Baltimore, Maryland during which she received conventional steampower propulsion, and recommissioned 2 June 1942. Assigned to the Atlantic Fleet she was employed as a training ship for PCs, SCs, YNs, and ARs off the North Carolina Capes with periodic refueling runs to the Bermuda training area until 6 November 1942.

At that time she commenced her first transatlantic crossing since World War I. Steaming from Norfolk via Bermuda, she arrived Casablanca 25 November and refueled small craft during the liberation of North Africa. She sailed for home 22 December, returning to Norfolk 9 January 1943 and completing an oil run to Aruba before getting underway again for North Africa 19 March. Refueled the tugs pulling the barges for the D Day invasion to Falmouth, England. Sank German submarine which surfaced in the convoy with a single shot to the subs conning tower from the 5 inch gun on the Maumee.

Maumee continued to transport fuel to north Africa until 8 July, when she was ordered to carry oil from the Netherlands West Indies to east coast Navy bases. For the next 8 months she operated between the Caribbean and bases as far north as NS Argentia, Newfoundland.

On 25 March 1944, the oiler resumed transatlantic runs, this time along the North Atlantic convoy route to Northern Ireland and England. After completing two voyages, she returned to coastal fueling runs between Aruba and the east coast 22 November.

In May 1945 Maumee received orders to join the Pacific Fleet. She departed Norfolk 20 June and arrived at Pearl Harbor 15 July, the same day she was redesignated AG-124. After a month at Pearl Harbor, she departed for China, arriving off the Yangtze River 30 September. Three days later she ascended the Huangpu River to Shanghai where she served as a station fuel ship until 16 November, when she sailed for Pearl Harbor.

== Postwar Service ==
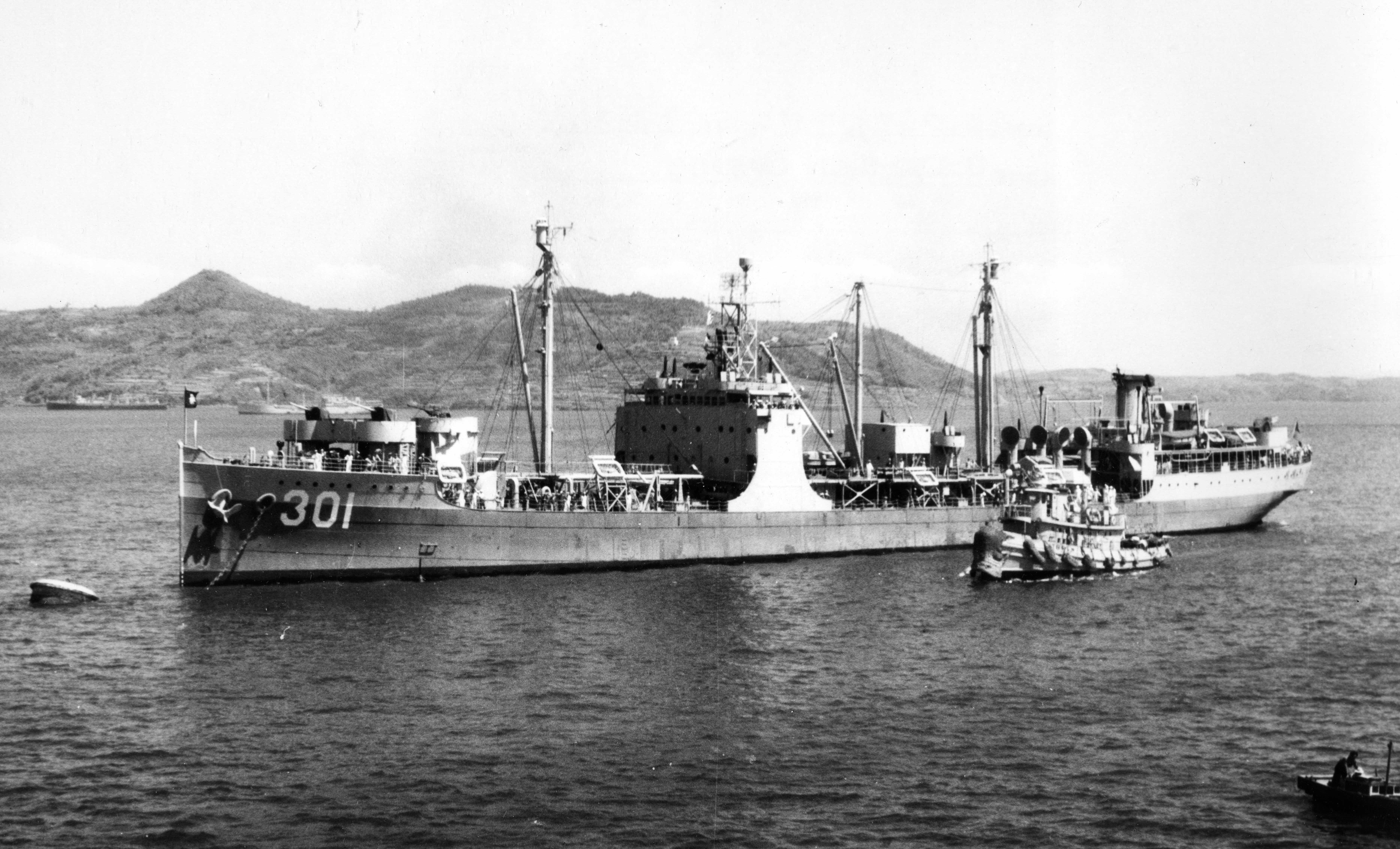
Omei (ex-Maumee II Fuel Ship No.14) Sasebo, Japan, 1 July 1951, seen from Sicily (CVE-118) 80 G 436782

In the wake of the formal Japanese surrender (2 September 1945), Maumee's role in the postwar fleet came under consideration, and on 21 September, the office of the Chief of Naval Operations (OpNav) recommended her disposal. Before that eventuality would come to pass, however, there was still work to be done. Maumee rendezvoused with Task Unit (TU) 70.2.3 and resumed her China-bound voyage and anchored off the Yangtze River on 30 September. Three days later, Maumee ascended the Whangpoo [Huangpu] River to Shanghai, where the oiler served as station fuel ship until she was reassigned to the Atlantic Fleet and returned to Pearl Harbor (16 November–8 December 1945).

She departed Hawaii 13 December, transited the Panama Canal, 1 January 1946, and arrived at Portsmouth, Virginia, on the 8th. She steamed southward (12–16 February 1946) carrying a cargo of oil to Guantanamo Bay 12 February, where she reported to TG 23.9, a shakedown group composed of former U.S. Navy vessels under lend lease originally slated for the British, but then provided to the Nationalist Chinese Government.

The TG 23.9 group consisted of eight ships of:

- Escort vessels:
1. Tai Kang 太康 (F.21) [ex-Wyffels (DE-6)], and
2. Tai Ping 太平 (F.22) [ex-Decker (DE-47)];
- Minesweepers:
1. Yung Ning 永寧 (AM.46) [ex-Magnet (AM-260)],
2. Yung Sheng 永勝 (AM.43) [ex-Lance (AM-257)],
3. Yung Shun 永順 (AM.44) [ex-Logic (AM-258)], and
4. Yung Ting 永定 (AM.45) [ex-Lucid (AM-259)]; as well as
- Patrol escorts:
1. Yung Hsing 永興 (ex-PCE-869), and
2. Yung Tai 永泰 (ex-PCE-867).

Maumee spent the next two months rendering repair, tender, and fuel services to the group in Cuban waters, and then was assigned to accompany them to China. The convoy proceeded from Guantánamo Bay to Havana, Cuba (8–11 April 1946), then resumed the voyage to the Panama Canal. The ships moored at Cristóbal on 19 April, and then (20–21 April) passed through the isthmian waterway.

The task group sailed for the Western Pacific 14 April. The following month Maumee received word that she too was to be transferred to the Nationalist Chinese Government under lend lease. The group arrived at Tsingtao 19 July and on 5 November ended 30 years of service to the US Navy.

Transferred to the Chinese Government on the same day, she commissioned on 5 November as ROCS Omei 峨嵋 (AO-309). For some unknown reason, the photo taken in Sasebo, Japan, on 1 July 1951, from USS Sicily (CVE-118) showed her number as 301.

Transferred to the Republic of China permanently on 7 February 1948, her name was struck from the U.S. Naval Vessel Register 12 March. Omei saw continuous service in the Republic of China Navy until she was decommissioned at Kaohsiung, Taiwan, in the summer of 1967. Stricken from the Chinese Naval Vessel Register shortly after, she was scrapped at the Kaohsiung Naval Base from August to October 1967.
