= USS Jolly Roger =

Patrol vessel of the United States Navy

History

United States
- Name: USS Jolly Roger
- Namesake: Previous name retained
- Builder: W. T. Ruddock, New York City
- Completed: 1917
- Acquired: 16 December 1917
- Commissioned: December 1917 or early 1918
- Stricken: 4 April 1919
- Fate: Damaged beyond repair 6 November 1918
- Notes: Operated as private motorboat Jolly Roger 1917

General characteristics
- Type: Patrol vessel
- Length: 55 ft 2 in (16.81 m)
- Beam: 9 ft 9 in (2.97 m)
- Draft: 3 ft (0.91 m)
- Speed: 20 knots
- Armament: 1 × 1-pounder gun; 1 × machine gun

USS Jolly Roger (SP-1031) was a United States Navy patrol vessel in commission from December 1917 or early 1918 until November 1918.

Jolly Roger was built as a private wooden motorboat of the same name in 1917 by W. T. Kuddock at New York City. In 1917, the U.S. Navy acquired her from her owner, J. S. Van Allen of New York City, for use as a section patrol boat during World War I. The Navy took delivery of her at Newport, Rhode Island, on 16 December 1917, and she was commissioned as USS Jolly Roger (SP-1031).

Assigned to the Torpedo Station at Newport, Jolly Roger performed work ranging torpedoes, as well as aiding in experimental work on naval mines and depth charges. She also engaged in general dispatch boat and supply work in the Newport harbor area.

While being loaded on board the replenishment oiler USS Kanawha (Oiler No. 1) on 6 November 1918, Jolly Roger was damaged beyond repair. She was stricken from the Navy List on 4 April 1919.
