= USS Pecos (AO-6) =

Kanawha-class replenishment oiler

Coordinates: 14°27′S 106°11′E

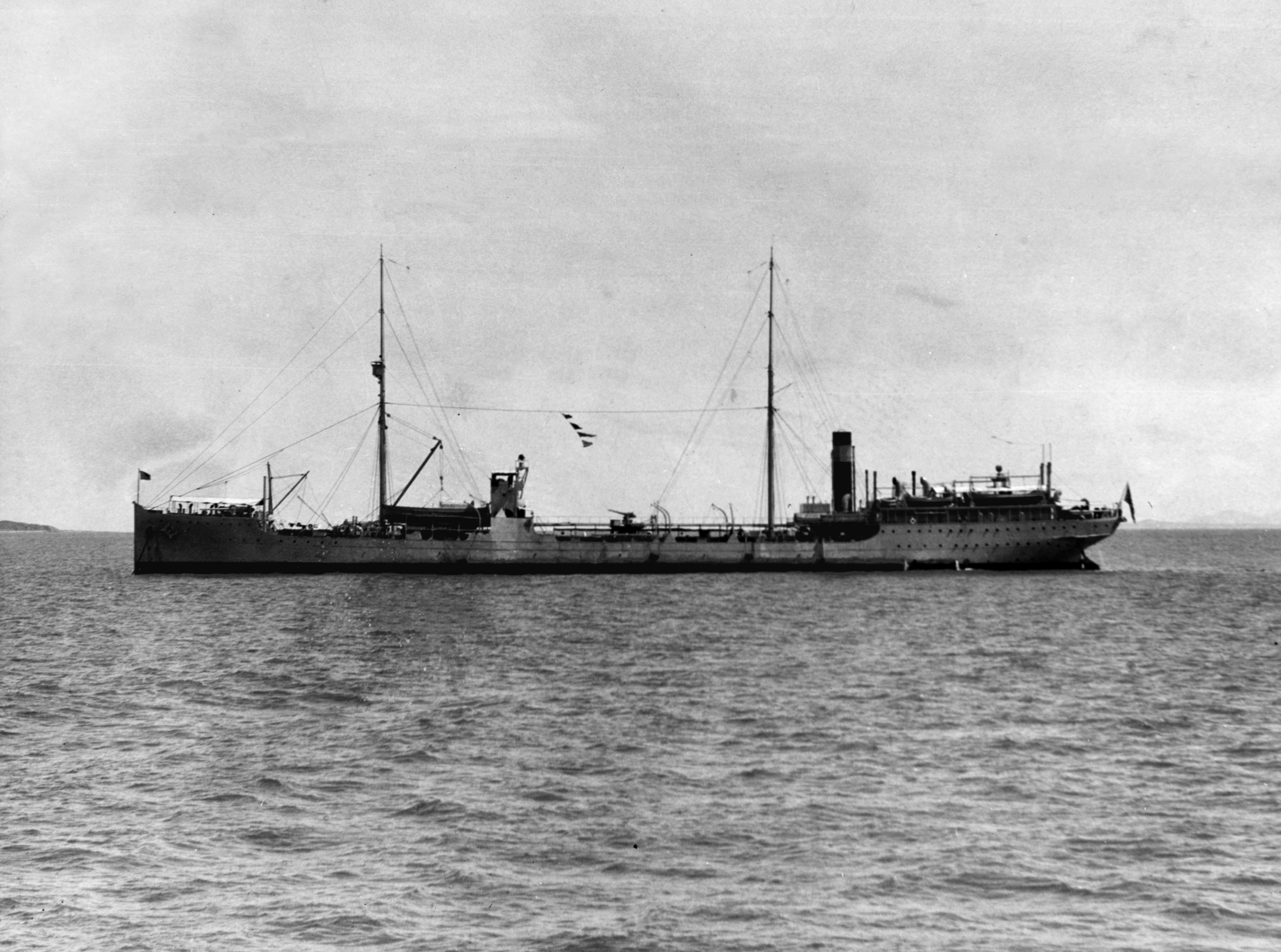
- USS Pecos (AO-6)

History

United States
- Name: USS Pecos
- Namesake: Pecos River in New Mexico
- Laid down: 2 June 1920
- Launched: 23 April 1921
- Commissioned: 25 August 1921
- Identification: AO-6
- Fate: Sunk by Japanese air attack from Sōryū and others, 1 March 1942

General characteristics
- Class & type: Kanawha-class fleet replenishment oiler
- Displacement: 5,723 tons light; 14,800 tons full load
- Length: 475 ft 7 in (144.96 m)
- Beam: 56 ft 3 in (17.15 m)
- Draft: 26 ft 8 in (8.13 m)
- Speed: 14 knots
- Complement: 317 officers and enlisted

USS Pecos (AO–6) was a Kanawha-class replenishment oiler of the United States Navy. She was commissioned in 1921 and sunk by 36 Japanese dive bombers from four different Imperial Japanese Navy (IJN) aircraft carriers south of Java on 1 March 1942.

== Operational history ==
USS Pecos was laid down as Fuel Ship No. 18 on 2 June 1920 at the Boston Navy Yard, Massachusetts, United States. During construction, the ship was reclassified AO–6 on 17 July 1920. She was launched on 23 April 1921, sponsored by Miss Anna S. Hubbard, and commissioned on 25 August 1921.

During the two decades before the United States entered World War II, Pecos operated in the Atlantic and Pacific Oceans.

When Japan attacked Pearl Harbor, Pecos was in the Philippines supporting the ships of the United States Asiatic Fleet. She departed Cavite Navy Yard on 8 December 1941 for Balikpapan, Borneo, arriving there on 14 December. After filling up with oil and gasoline, the tanker continued on to Makassar in Celebes, Netherlands East Indies, where she refueled American warships fighting to slow the rapid advance of Japanese forces. She departed Makassar for Darwin, Australia, on 22 December 1941.

She departed Darwin on 23 January 1942, headed for Soerabaja, Java, where she fueled Allied ships until departing on 3 February after a major Japanese air raid made that port untenable. Tjilatjap, on the southern coast of Java, which she reached on 6 February, became the oiler's base. She received fuel from bulk carriers and then replenished various Allied ships. Attempts to save more bunker oil, transferred from Dutch tank farms at Surabaja, were met with opposition and not successful. By 27 February, Pecos needed to leave Tjilatjap, so her berth could be used by the seaplane tender USS Langley (AV-3), coming to Java from Australia with Royal Australian Air Force (RAAF) fighter planes and crews. At that time, the need for evacuation shipping from Java—which was clearly doomed—had become quite urgent. The captain of Pecos (CDR E. Paul Abernethy) would only permit ambulatory cases of wounded men (from Houston and Marblehead) in addition to other stragglers from ships already lost, such as USS Stewart (DD-224), abandoned at Surabaja. After departing Tjilatjap on 27 February, Abernethy began intercepting radio messages about the bombing of Langley. He hoped to escape Japanese forces and turned to the west, but was soon directed by COMSOWESPAC (VADM Wm. Glassford Jr.) via messages sent to USS Parrott (DD-218), which was escorting Pecos, to meet the destroyers Whipple and Edsall at Christmas Island. There, the two destroyers were to transfer the survivors of Langley to Pecos.

Whipple then proceeded towards the Cocos Islands to meet with the tanker Belita to act as her antisubmarine screen, while Edsall was directed to return to Tjilatjap, carrying the 31 U.S. Army Air Force (USAAF) pilots and 10 or 11 ground crew who had been passengers on Langley. The USAAF personnel were to assemble and fly 27 disassembled and crated P-40 fighters that had been shipped to Tjilatjap aboard the cargo ship Sea Witch. Pecos, now carrying as many as 700 survivors from Langley, Houston, Marblehead, and Stewart, was ordered to Australia.

At noon that day, after being spotted by IJN air patrols only about 70 miles distant, Pecos was located and attacked by 18 Type 99 (VAL) dive bombers from the Japanese aircraft carriers Sōryū and Kaga. Two more groups of 18 planes, from carriers Hiryu and Akagi, struck again an hour later. For some time, Pecos sent out distress calls to any Allied ships in the area, as the ship was assumed to be lost. The gunners on Pecos, despite lacking modern weaponry, gave a valiant account of themselves, shooting up the enemy dive bombers and putting holes in no fewer than 17 enemy machines. One of the planes from Hiryu caught fire as it landed back on the carrier and had to be pushed overboard in flames. IJN records indicate the distance between the Japanese force and Pecos could then have been as little as 20 miles. Nagumo gave orders to RADM Omori of 1st Torpedo Squadron to send two destroyers to rescue survivors of Pecos. Omori sent the destroyers Tanikaze and Urakaze of the 17th Division, but they never found the men in the water and returned to Nagumo KdB as dusk came on.

Executive Officer Lt. Commander Lawrence J. McPeake was posthumously awarded the Silver Star for valor for his actions aboard Pecos. After the order to abandon ship was given by the ship's captain, Commander Abernethy, McPeake was seen engaging Japanese VAL dive bombers, which were machine-gunning survivors in the water. By some crewmembers' accounts, he was reported to have made it off the ship after it went down. Others reported him last being seen manning the machine gun. In fact, he did swim away from the vessel with another officer as it was going down. His body was never recovered, though, and he eventually was listed as killed in action after the war.

After Pecos was sunk, Whipple warily proceeded to the area, arriving after dark. She eventually rescued about 232 survivors. Many of them, although visible by crew members of Whipple, were unable to be picked up and were abandoned at sea, due to the detection of what were thought to be two enemy submarines in the area at extremely close range. This led to the dropping of depth charges, which may have injured or killed men in the water. (The submarine contact was not a mirage. The IJN submarine RO-33 reported sighting and stalking an Allied destroyer south-southeast of Christmas Island that night. She fired a single torpedo, which—luckily for the Americans—missed.) Of over 630 total crewmen and Langley survivors on Pecos, more than 400 were left behind and died. Exact casualty numbers for the doomed ships of the United States Asiatic Fleet and American-British-Dutch-Australian Command are impossible to gather because so many Allied warships were sunk in the Dutch East Indies campaign (at least 24 total), and many of those ships had already picked up survivors of other sunken ships and then were also sunk by the Japanese hours or days later.
