= Kanawha-class fleet replenishment oiler =

Class of United States Navy oilers

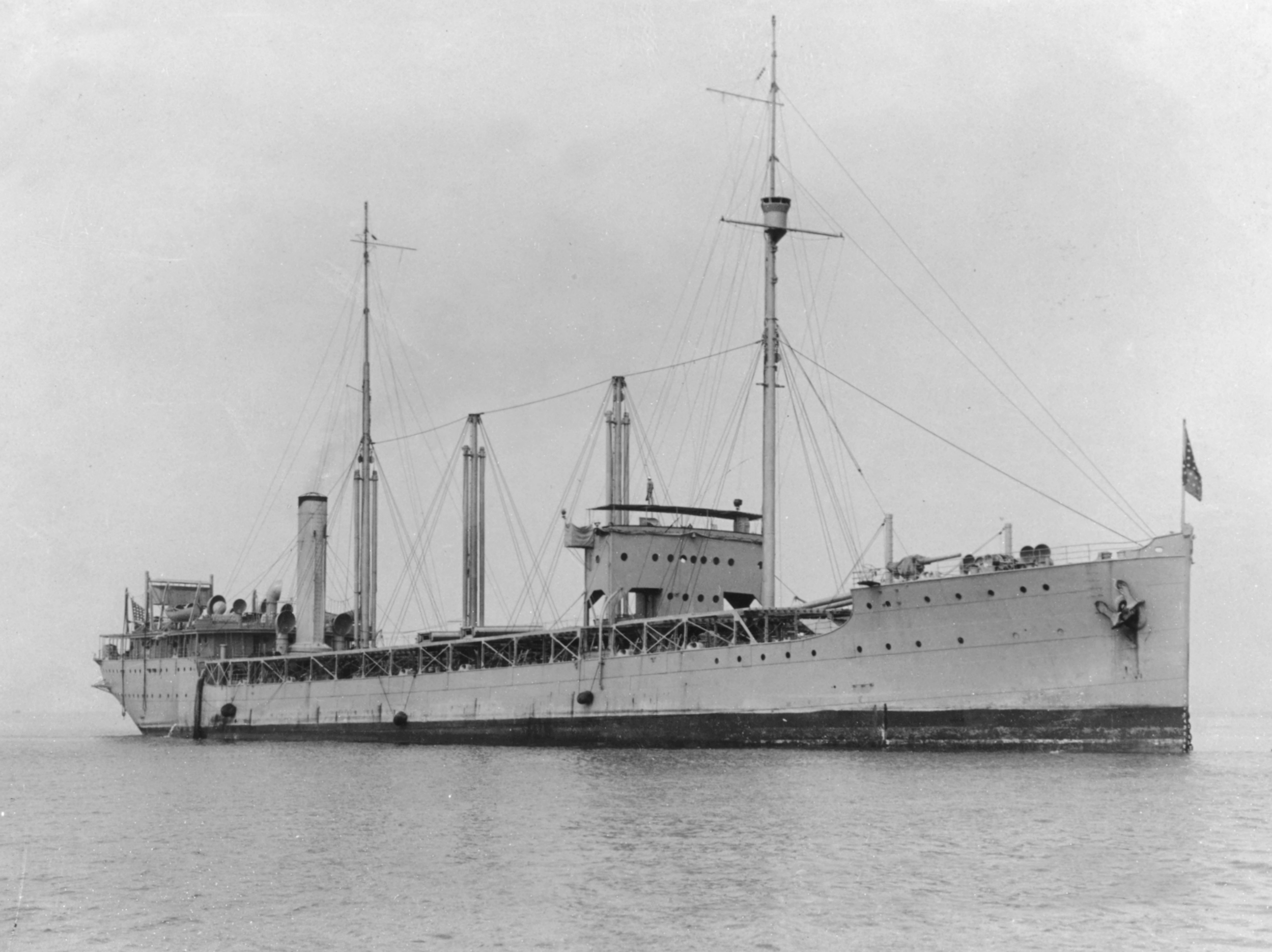
- USS Kanawha

Class overview
- Name: Kanawha class
- Builders: Mare Island Naval Shipyard; Boston Navy Yard
- Operators: United States Navy; Republic of China Navy
- Preceded by: None
- Succeeded by: Patoka class
- Subclasses: Cuyama class
- Built: 1913–1921
- In commission: 1915–1946
- Planned: 6
- Completed: 6
- Lost: 3
- Retired: 3

General characteristics
- Type: Oil tanker
- Displacement: 5,723 long tons (5,815 t) light; 14,800 long tons (15,037 t) full load
- Length: 475 ft 7 in (144.96 m)
- Beam: 56 ft 3 in (17.15 m)
- Draft: 26 ft 8 in (8.13 m)
- Speed: 14 knots (26 km/h; 16 mph)
- Complement: 317 officers and enlisted
- Armament: 2 × 5-inch/38-caliber guns; 2 × twin Bofors 40 mm guns; 2 × twin Oerlikon 20 mm cannons

The Kanawha-class oiler was a class of oil tankers of United States Navy and later sold to the Republic of China Navy.

== Development ==
Six oilers were ordered for construction by the Mare Island Naval Shipyard and the Boston Navy Yard. They were one of the earliest purpose-built oilers for the United States Navy. Kanawha and Maumee were recommissioned during the Second World War meanwhile the other ships remained in service ever since commissioning.

The Cuyama subclass was an improved version of the first two ships of the Kanawha class.

Kanawha, Neches and Pecos were sunk in battles in the Pacific against the Japanese while the other three served until the end of the war. Maumee was transferred on a lend lease to the Nationalist Army in China in which she was renamed ROCS Omei (AO-509).

== Ships of class ==
Hull number	Name	Callsign	Builders	Laid down	Launched	Commissioned	Decommissioned	Fate
Kanawha-class oiler
AO-1	Kanawha	NND / NEQD	Mare Island Navy Yard	8 December 1913	11 July 1914	5 June 1915		Sunk off Tulagi Harbor on 8 April 1943
AO-2 / AG-124	Maumee	NNE / NEQL	Mare Island Navy Yard	23 July 1914	17 April 1915	20 October 1916	5 November 1946	Transferred to the Republic of China and renamed ROCS Omei (AO-509).
Cuyama-class oiler
AO-3	Cuyama	NERP	Mare Island Navy Yard	15 December 1915	17 June 1916	12 April 1917	12 April 1946	Scrapped on 10 September 1947
AO-4	Brazos	NIFK	Boston Navy Yard	21 June 1917	1 May 1919	1 October 1919	8 February 1946	Scrapped on 6 January 1947
AO-5	Neches	NIFP	Boston Navy Yard	8 June 1919	2 June 1920	25 October 1920		Sunk by I-72 on 23 January 1942
AO-6	Pecos	NIFQ	Boston Navy Yard	2 June 1920	23 April 1921	25 August 1921		Sunk by aircraft from Sōryū on 1 March 1942
