= USS Hogan =

Wickes-class destroyer

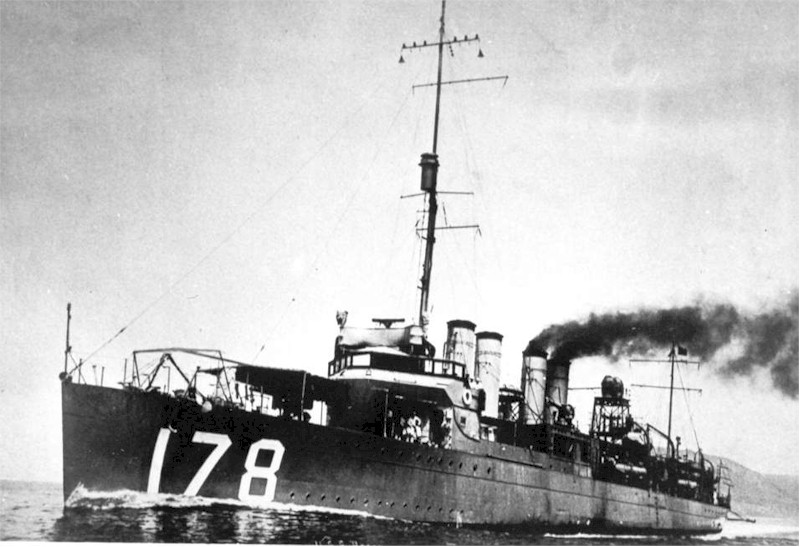

History

United States
- Name: USS Hogan
- Namesake: Daniel Hogan
- Builder: Union Iron Works, San Francisco, California
- Laid down: 25 November 1918
- Launched: 12 April 1919
- Commissioned: 1 October 1919
- Decommissioned: 27 May 1922
- Recommissioned: 7 August 1940
- Decommissioned: 11 October 1945
- Reclassified: DMS-6, 1940; AG-105, 5 June 1945
- Stricken: 1 November 1945
- Honors and awards: 6 battle stars (World War II)
- Fate: Sunk as a target, 8 November 1945

General characteristics
- Class & type: Wickes-class destroyer
- Displacement: 1,060 long tons (1,077 t)
- Length: 314 ft 6 in (95.86 m) o/a
- Beam: 31 ft 8 in (9.65 m)
- Draft: 8 ft 6 in (2.59 m)
- Propulsion: Geared Turbines, 2 screws
- Speed: 35 knots (65 km/h; 40 mph)
- Complement: 101 officers and enlisted
- Armament: 4 × 4"/50 caliber guns; 2 × 3"/23 caliber guns; 12 × 21 inch (533 mm) torpedo tubes

USS Hogan (DD-178/DMS-6) was a Wickes-class destroyer in the United States Navy during World War II.

== Namesake ==
Daniel Hogan entered the Navy on board the schooner USS Revenge at Boston, Massachusetts, in 1811 and transferred to frigate USS Constitution on 18 February 1812. During the War of 1812 he won distinction on board Constitution in an engagement with the British frigate HMS Guerriere. When Constitution's flag was shot away from the main topgallant masthead, Hogan climbed the rigging and lashed the colors to the masthead. This action was to prevent the enemy from thinking Constitution had struck her colors.

In later action between Constitution and HMS Java on 3 January 1813 he was severely wounded, losing the fingers of both hands. He died on 1 September 1818.

== Construction and commissioning ==
Hogan was launched by Union Iron Works, San Francisco, California, 12 April 1919; sponsored by Mrs. Magnus A. Anderson, a sister of the Secretary of the Interior Franklin K. Lane and commissioned 1 October 1919.

== Service history ==
After shakedown, Hogan arrived at San Diego on 21 November to join the Pacific Destroyer Force. From 23 November to 6 February 1920 she sailed in company with her division and engaged in fleet maneuvers, patrol duty, torpedo exercises and target practice along the California coast. On 25 March she departed for Hawaii, where she operated for the next month. The destroyer rejoined her squadron at San Diego in late April for five months of gunnery exercises and trial runs in that area. She returned to San Diego in early 1921 and engaged in important experimental torpedo practice and divisional operations until 9 December. During that time, in October, Hogan became the first US Navy ship to be refuelled while underway, towed astern by the oiler Cuyama. For the remainder of her service Hogan assisted U.S. battleships in conducting torpedo firing exercises in the Pacific. She decommissioned at San Diego on 27 May 1922.

=== Conversion to minesweeper ===
Recommissioned 7 August 1940, Hogan underwent conversion to a high speed minesweeper at Mare Island and reclassified DMS-6. Her activity up to World War II consisted mainly of intensified minesweeper training and patrol duty in the Caribbean and along the Eastern Coast,

=== World War II ===
During the early months of the war, Hogan acted as a convoy escort in the Caribbean and eastern Atlantic, protecting shipping from U-boat attack. The first major operation in which she took part was the invasion of North Africa in late 1942. For this important amphibious assault, mounted over an entire ocean, Hogan departed Norfolk 24 October and arrived with the Center Force off Fedhala for preliminary sweeps 7 November. As the landings began early next day, the minesweeper continued to patrol the vital transport area. Just after 05:00, she was sent to investigate strange running lights and came upon a French steamer and escort vessel. Hogan ordered both ships to reverse course, and when the order was not obeyed fired a burst of machine gun fire across the escort's bow. The ship, Victoria, replied with fire of her own and attempted to ram the minesweeper, but Hogan avoided her and with 20 mm fire forced her surrender.

In the days that followed, the minesweeper continued to conduct antisubmarine patrol off Fedhala, searching for submarines that attacked the transports on 11 November. The ship entered Casablanca harbor on 18 November, the invasion a success, and after patrol duties sailed for Norfolk, arriving on 26 December.

Hogan next returned to coastal convoy duties until November 1943. She sailed on 13 November from Norfolk to join the Pacific Fleet, transited the Panama Canal, arriving at Mare Island on 5 December. The minesweeper was needed for the first phase of the long island campaign toward Japan, the invasion of the Marshalls, and sailed for Pearl Harbor and Kwajalein on 16 January 1944. Hogan carried out anti-submarine patrol off Roi Island before departing on 4 February for Espiritu Santo, where she arrived on 27 February.

After another period of convoy duty, Hogan arrived at Milne Bay on 7 April to prepare for the Hollandia operation. The attack group sailed on 18 April and arrived at Humboldt Bay four days later. Hogan and other minesweepers cleared enemy mines for Admiral Daniel Barbey's invasion force, after which the ship carried out shore bombardment and screening duties. She arrived at Cape Sudest with HMAS Westralia on 25 April.

Hogan sailed from Eniwetok on 10 June to make preliminary sweeps of Saipan for the invasion to come. She remained off Saipan during the assault on 15 June, coming under enemy shore fire, and moved to Guam the next day. As the Japanese fleet moved toward the Marianas for a decisive naval battle, Hogan returned to Saipan to protect the transports. In the great carrier battle which followed 19–20 June, the American fleet won a stunning victory, crippling the Japanese naval air arm and securing the Marianas operation from interference. Hogan returned to the staging base at Eniwetok on 30 June, but returned to Guam on 12 July to carry out screening and minesweeping duties for the assault there. She arrived at Espiritu Santo on 5 August 1944.

Following a tour of escort duty in the Solomons, Hogan steamed via Pearl Harbor to San Francisco for repairs, arriving on 5 October. As the recapture of the Philippines gained momentum, the ship steamed from San Francisco on 6 November and arrived at the Manus staging area on 4 December 1944. Moving to Leyte Gulf before Christmas, Hogan sortied with the Minesweeping and Hydrographic Group on 2 January 1945. Kamikaze attacks began soon afterward, and continued during the voyage to Lingayen Gulf. The minesweepers entered the invasion area on 2 January and began their sweeping operations. Four of the minesweepers were sunk or damaged, and Hogan's gunners were busy with attacking aircraft. With the operation well underway, the ship arrived at Leyte Gulf on 16 January.

After retiring to Tinian, Hogan sailed once more on 7 February to take part in the important assault on Iwo Jima. During this operation she swept mines, screened transports, and carried out shore bombardment before departing with a group of battleships and their escorts 7 March. Arriving Pearl Harbor on 13 April via Ulithi she continued to San Diego on 3 May 1945.

Hogan underwent major repairs and reclassified AG-105 on 5 June 1945. The veteran ship was assigned as a target ship for bombing tests and was sunk off San Diego on 8 November 1945.

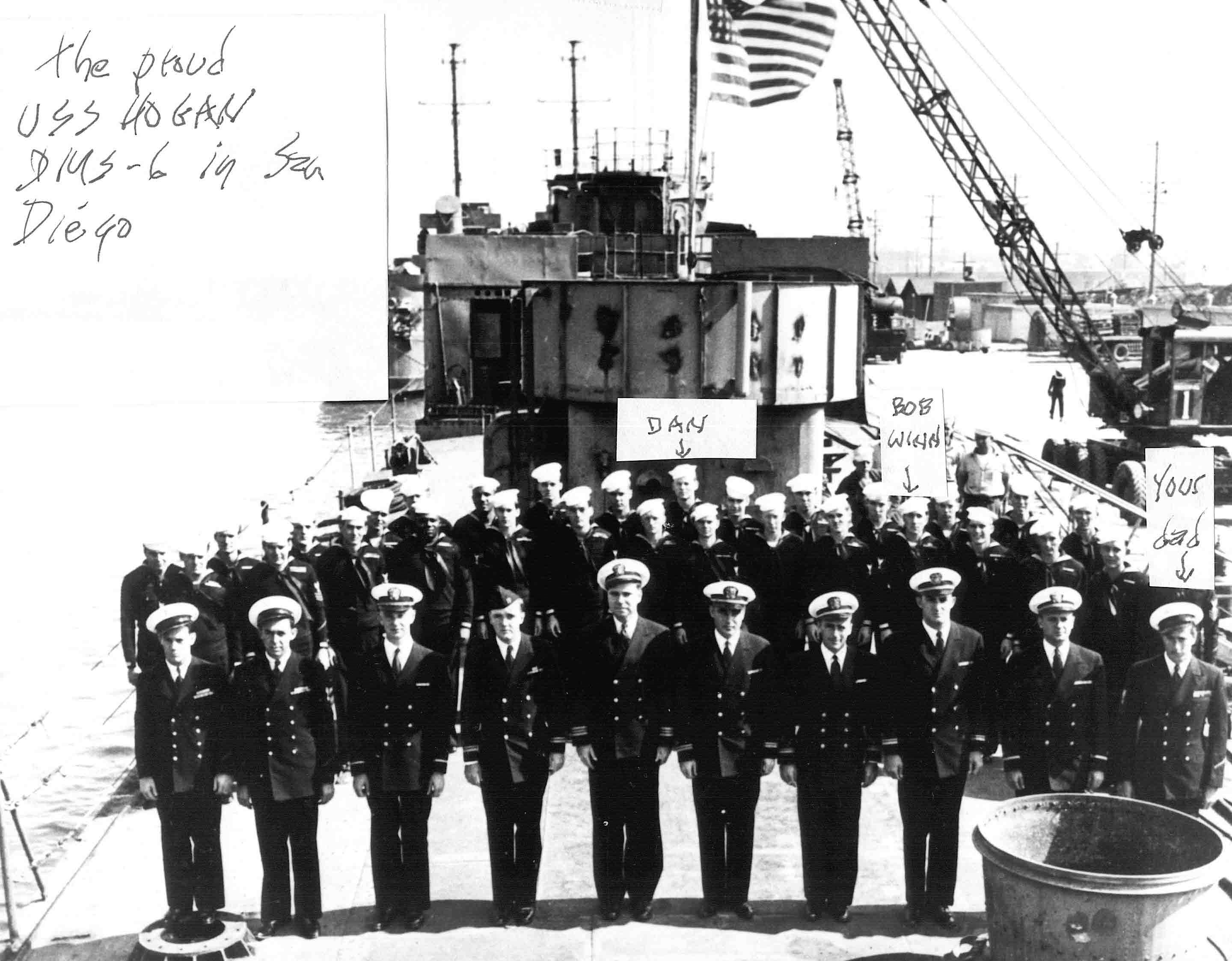

== Awards ==
Hogan received six battle stars for World War II service, for sinking four submarines and bringing down two planes.

As of 2009, no other ship in the United States Navy has borne this name.
