= USS Cuyama =

Oiler of the United States Navy

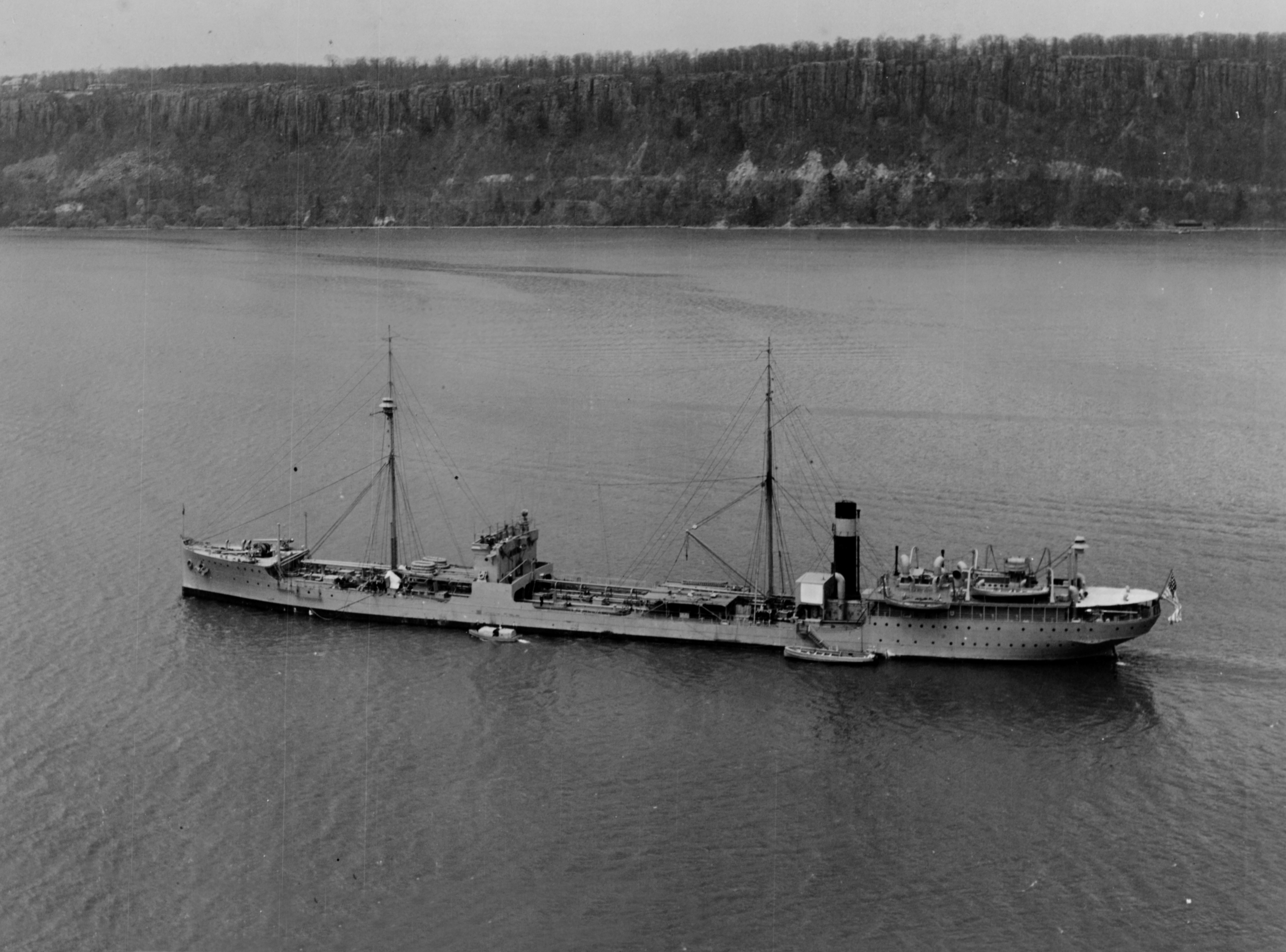
- USS Cuyama (AO-3)

History

United States
- Name: Cuyama
- Namesake: Cuyama River
- Laid down: 15 December 1915
- Launched: 17 June 1916
- Commissioned: 12 April 1917
- Decommissioned: 2 April 1946
- Identification: AO-3
- Fate: Sold for scrap, 1946

General characteristics
- Class & type: Kanawha-class fleet replenishment oiler
- Displacement: 5,723 long tons (5,815 t) light; 14,800 long tons (15,037 t) full
- Length: 475 ft 1 in (144.81 m)
- Beam: 56 ft 2 in (17.12 m)
- Draft: 26 ft 8 in (8.13 m)
- Speed: 14.3 knots (26.5 km/h; 16.5 mph)
- Complement: 136
- Armament: 2 × 5"/38 caliber guns; 2 × 3"/50 caliber guns

USS Cuyama (AO-3) was a tanker of the United States Navy launched 17 June 1916 by Mare Island Navy Yard; sponsored by Miss M. Offley; and commissioned 2 April 1917.

Cuyama was named after the Cuyama River. After her maiden voyage to Pearl Harbor in May 1917, Cuyama departed San Francisco 6 June, loaded petroleum products at Port Arthur, Texas, and arrived at Norfolk 6 July. She called at Boston, New York City, and Bayonne, before sailing from Norfolk 11 August with a convoy bound for England. Returning to Norfolk 19 September, she was fitted for transporting aircraft. She made three convoy voyages from New York to England until 9 January 1918 when she was transferred to the Naval Overseas Transportation Service. She made six voyages to the United Kingdom delivering war cargo until 17 October.

Cuyama departed New York 16 December 1918 to bring oil and gasoline from Port Arthur to Norfolk, then sailed 4 January 1919 to supply the Fleet in the Caribbean until returning to Norfolk 13 May.

The oiler stood out of Norfolk 25 June 1919, and arrived at San Pedro, California, 7 August after fueling ships at Acapulco, Mexico. Classified AO-3 on 7 July 1920, she remained on the west coast procuring and dispensing oil and gasoline cargoes, servicing ships, and occasionally transporting passengers, provisions, and freight, or towing yard craft. In October 1921 Cuyama conducted the first ever underway refueling, towing the destroyer Hogan astern; over the next three years she was the test ship for developing the technique of alongside refueling, first of destroyers and then larger vessels. Cuyama therefore played a key role in the development of what would prove a major factor in the successful war against Japan. In 1927 and 1934 she cruised to the east coast for fleet maneuvers and in 1936, 1937, and 1938 made 13 voyages from the west coast to Pearl Harbor on transport duty. During 1941 she made five similar voyages and practiced refueling at sea with the cruisers of the Scouting Force. She arrived at San Diego 26 November 1941 for overhaul.

Cuyama began her war service by carrying cargo between Pearl Harbor and San Pedro, Calif., from 27 December 1941 to 1 March 1942. Between 15 March and 29 June, she delivered fuel in two voyages to Efate, Noumea, the Tonga and Samoan Islands. She cleared San Pedro once more 25 July loaded men, cargo, and equipment at Seattle, Washington, and arrived at Kodiak, Alaska, 11 August. She operated in Alaskan waters fueling ships and occasionally voyaging to Seattle for replenishment and repairs.

Cuyama cleared Seattle 17 February 1945, delivered cargo to Eniwetok, Saipan, and Guam, and arrived at Kerama Retto, Okinawa, 21 April to fuel the ships engaged in the occupation of Okinawa. She splashed a suicide plane 13 May, and bombarded a Japanese-occupied cave on Tokashiki Shima 7 July. Returning to Ulithi 31 July, she sailed on to Leyte where between 5 and 30 August she fueled ships preparing for the occupation of Japan. Between 12 September to 6 November, Cuyama fueled ships at Jinsen, Korea, then cleared for San Francisco, arriving 27 November. Cuyama was decommissioned 12 April 1946 and transferred to the Maritime Commission for disposal 1 July 1946.

Cuyama received one battle star for World War II service.
