= USS Brazos =

Oiler of the United States Navy

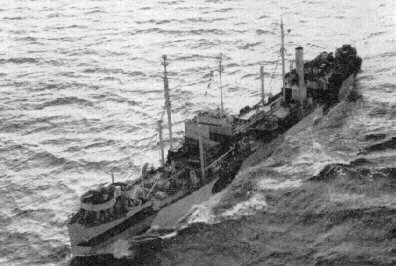
- USS Brazos

History

United States
- Name: USS Brazos
- Namesake: Brazos River
- Builder: Boston Navy Yard
- Cost: $2,421,160.73 (hull & machinery)
- Launched: 1 May 1919
- Commissioned: 1 October 1919
- Decommissioned: 8 February 1946
- Honors and awards: 1 battle star (World War II)
- Fate: Scrapped, 1947

General characteristics
- Class & type: Kanawha-class fleet replenishment oiler
- Displacement: 5,723 long tons (5,815 t) light; 14,800 long tons (15,037 t) full
- Length: 475 ft 1 in (144.81 m)
- Beam: 56 ft 2 in (17.12 m)
- Draft: 26 ft 8 in (8.13 m)
- Speed: 14.3 knots (26.5 km/h; 16.5 mph)
- Complement: 136
- Armament: 2 × 5"/38 caliber guns; 2 × 3"/50 caliber guns

USS Brazos (AO-4) was an Kanawha-class fleet oiler built during World War I for service in the United States Navy, and named for the Brazos River, the longest river in the State of Texas.

Brazos was laid down at the Boston Navy Yard; launched 1 May 1919; sponsored by Miss Catherine Rush; and commissioned 1 October 1919.

== Service history ==
=== 1919–1941 ===
As a tanker attached to the Train, Scouting Fleet, Brazos carried fuel oil and stores along the east coast of the United States and in the Caribbean. In 1922 she served temporarily with the U. S. Naval Detachment in Turkish waters and transferred personnel and remains of the war dead from Marseille to the United States. In 1924 she joined Train, Squadron 1, Fleet Base Force, to carry fuel and supplies to support the fleet. In 1925 she cruised with the fleet in Hawaii, Samoa, and Australia. Except for brief periods in reduced commission for overhaul and repair, the succeeding years saw no variation in the vital duties performed by Brazos.

=== 1941–1946 ===
On 7 December 1941 Brazos was carrying fuel from the west coast to the Aleutian Islands and Alaska. She continued servicing ships in this area until 27 June 1942. After operating briefly in the vicinity of the Hawaiian and Samoan Islands, she returned to the Aleutians where she remained until 27 January 1945. On 29 March 1945 she arrived at Okinawa to furnish logistics support for the invasion fleet, after having made several brief stops in the southwestern Pacific. She remained at Okinawa until the middle of October except for a brief period of availability at Leyte, Philippine Islands. She then departed for Japan and supported the occupation forces until 9 November 1945.

On 26 November 1945 Brazos returned to San Francisco where she remained until decommissioned on 8 February 1946. She was transferred to the Maritime Commission 1 July 1946. Brazos was scrapped in 1947.

== Awards ==
During her active military service she was awarded the American Defense Service Medal (with Fleet clasp), the American Campaign Medal, the Asiatic-Pacific Campaign Medal, the World War II Victory Medal, and the Navy Occupation Service Medal (with Asia clasp). She also received a Battle Star for her World War II service.

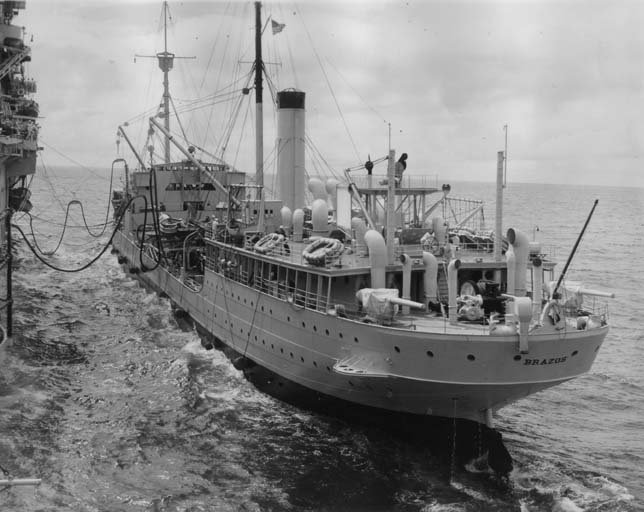
Stern view of the Brazos (AO-4) refueling the USS Yorktown (CV-5) mid-Pacific, July 1940.

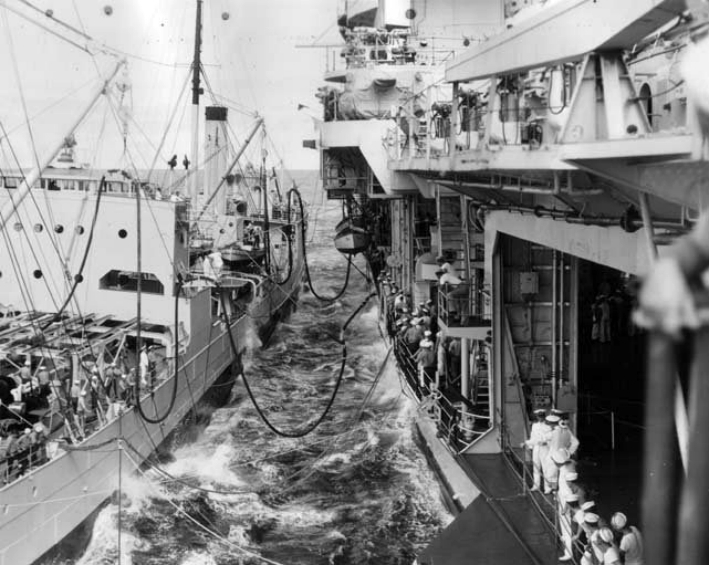
The Brazos (AO-4) refuels the USS Yorktown (CV-5) in July 1940.
