= Balthus Through the Looking Glass =

- Directed by: Damian Pettigrew
- Written by: Damian Pettigrew
- Produced by: Olivier Gal; Planète (France)
- Starring: Balthus; Philippe Noiret; Jean Leymarie; Jean Clair; François Rouan; James Lord; Antoinette de Watteville; Pierre Rosenberg; André Barelier; Setsuko and Harumi Klossowska de Rola; Stanislaus and Thadée Klossowski de Rola
- Narrated by: Bernard Verley
- Cinematography: Paco Wiser
- Edited by: Florence Ricard
- Music by: Mozart; Faton Cahen
- Distributed by: Arte Vidéo
- Release date: 1996
- Running time: 72 minutes
- Country: France
- Languages: French; English; Italian
- Budget: $450,000 (estimated)

Balthus Through the Looking-Glass (French: Balthus de l'autre côté du miroir) is a 1996 French documentary film directed by Damian Pettigrew on the French painter Balthus.

The film was honored in a cycle of film classics by Jean Renoir, Marcel Carné, and Jean Vigo at the Museum Ludwig (Cologne, Germany) in September 2007.

== Synopsis ==
The feature length documentary highlights the painter's complex creative process with rare footage of the artist at work in his studio on the grounds of his Grand Chalet in the Swiss mountain village of Rossinière. Conversations with Balthus and his wife Setsuko, his daughter Harumi, his sons Stanislaus and Thadée, interviews with art critics Jean Leymarie, Jean Clair, Pierre Rosenberg, and James Lord, and with French painter François Rouan (who often assisted Balthus during his tenure at the Villa Medici), contribute to form a psychological portrait of a secretive and controversial artist.

Also featured are photographs by Henri Cartier-Bresson and Irving Penn, and much unpublished material. The film was shot in Super 16 over a 12-month period in Switzerland, Italy, France, and the Moors of England.

== Reception ==
The French weekly magazine Télérama described the film as "a beautiful portrait, vibrant, varied and, beyond the magnificent images, tender, respectful, and compelling." "Along with his habits and customs preserved on film," wrote Hervé Gaumont, art critic for Libération, "the master's slowness is admirably rendered." Le Journal des Arts praised the "subtle approach, neither didactic nor pedagogical, that succeeds in capturing the painter's intimate world." Art critic Florence Couturiau reviewed the film in Muséart as one "photographed with precision and magic, from Paris to Rome by way of Balthus's Italian castle. The geometry of the compositions and the subtlety of the painter's palette shine through each frame of film." Le Figaro regretted the artist's legendary reserve but admired "a visually stunning documentary that transforms an indiscreet visit into a poetic and analytical portrait... The film examines the cruelty and isolation of Balthus in the light of his close friendship with Artaud who, describing the painter as his double, descended into madness while his twin fled with his sanity still intact. In counterpoint, Philippe Noiret sees in Balthus a surrogate father offering a reassuring affection."

Film critic Michel Parmentier of TéléCable Satellite applauded its intimate approach: "Near-definitive, the portrait examines the key moments of the painter's life and, more importantly, plunges the viewer into his strange and haunting universe... Balthus reveals various secrets. The level of intimacy is such that Pettigrew's documentary becomes an exceptional work." Le Nouvel Observateur reviewed it as "a successful and moving portrait." The French on-line DVD magazine, Dvdrama, reported that "the interviews, particularly those conducted with the artist's sons, are filled with fascinating anecdotes. There is real pleasure in watching the film as the director of Fellini: I'm a Born Liar skilfully marries erudition with emotion, allowing us to penetrate the painter's austere and complex personality devoted entirely to his art."

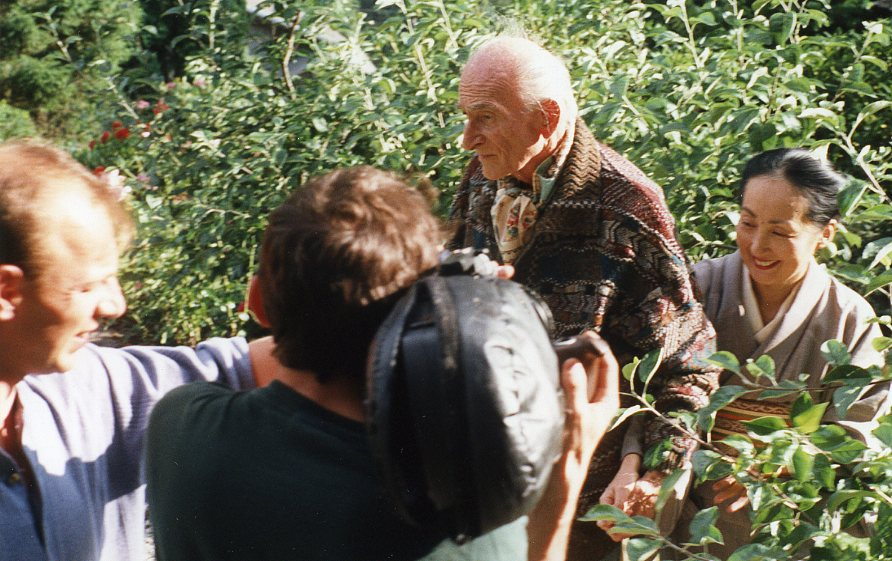
Balthus and his wife Setsuko during filming.

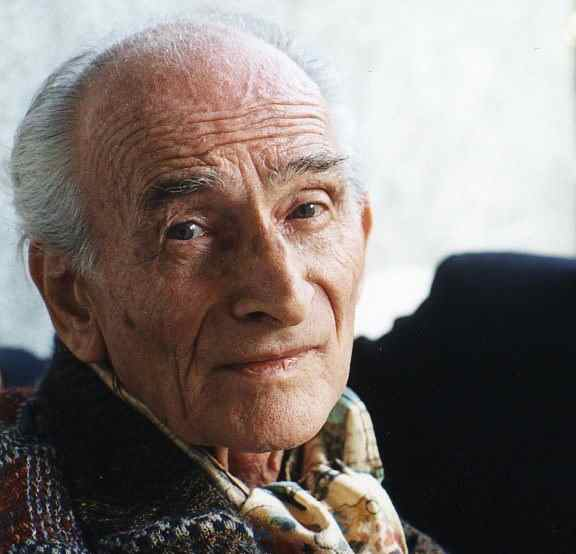
Balthus on film set (1996).

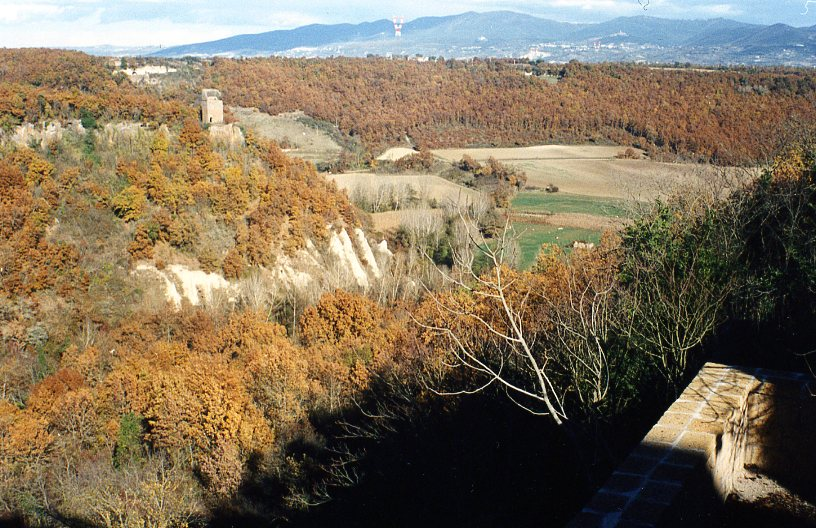
View from Monte Calvello, Balthus's Italian castle that inspired a series of paintings, drawings, and watercolours.

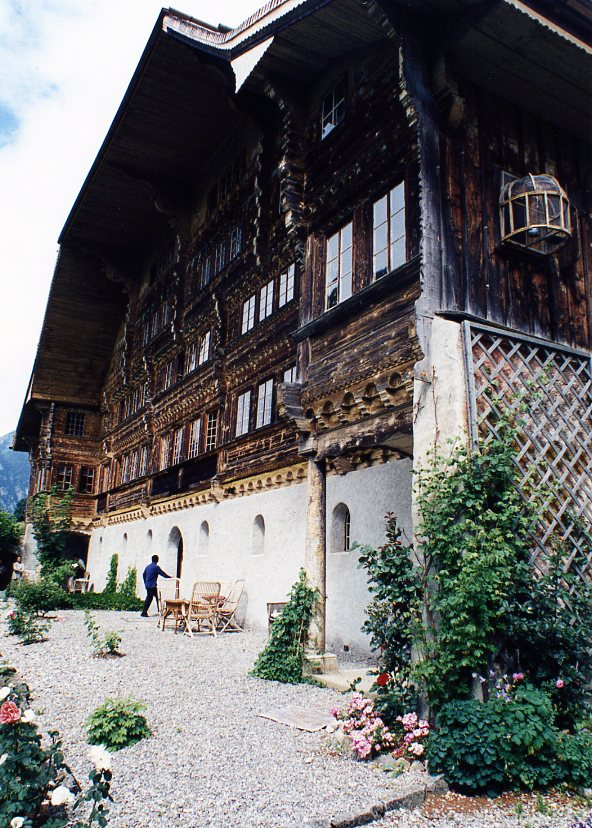
The Grand Chalet, the painter's home in Rossinière, Switzerland.

== Quotes from the film ==
François Rouan: "The piss that one cherishes when it streams from the beloved... The central question of painting, and particularly in Balthus's work, is the sexual dimension. If Balthus were here, he'd light up a cigarette, yet another one, and assume a humorous air, naturally he would let me have my say, and then he'd conclude by telling me that the young women he paints are angels."

Jean Leymarie: "Angels, as Rilke noted, are terrifying. And beauty itself is terrifying."

Jean Clair: "Perhaps his greatest moments are when his cruelty explodes onto the canvas. Balthus possesses a Sadean element."

Balthus: "The quickest way to become famous during the 1930s was by causing a scandal."

== Awards ==
- 1996: Grand Prize - XXIst UNESCO International Festival of Art Films
- 1996: Best Photography Prize - Lausanne International Art Film Festival
- 1996: Official Selection - 8th International VUE SUR LES DOCS Marseille

== DVD ==
The feature documentary is available in an international DVD edition released by Arte Vidéo in October 2007 (NTSC / All zones format). The 2-disc anamorphically enhanced Collectors Edition includes the 72' theatrical version together with bonus material featuring:

- Three Balthusian Lessons - a 24' documentary with Jean Clair, Jean Leymarie and François Rouan based on the sacred, the profane, and the Japanese Zen concept of satori;
- Tea at the Grand Chalet - a 10' document with Anna, Balthus's last adolescent model, taking afternoon tea with the painter and his wife at the Grand Chalet. In the course of their easy-going conversations, the painter's sunny mood clouds over when he considers the work on his easel as a daunting challenge.
