= Grand Chalet =

Coordinates: 46°27′57″N 7°05′04″E

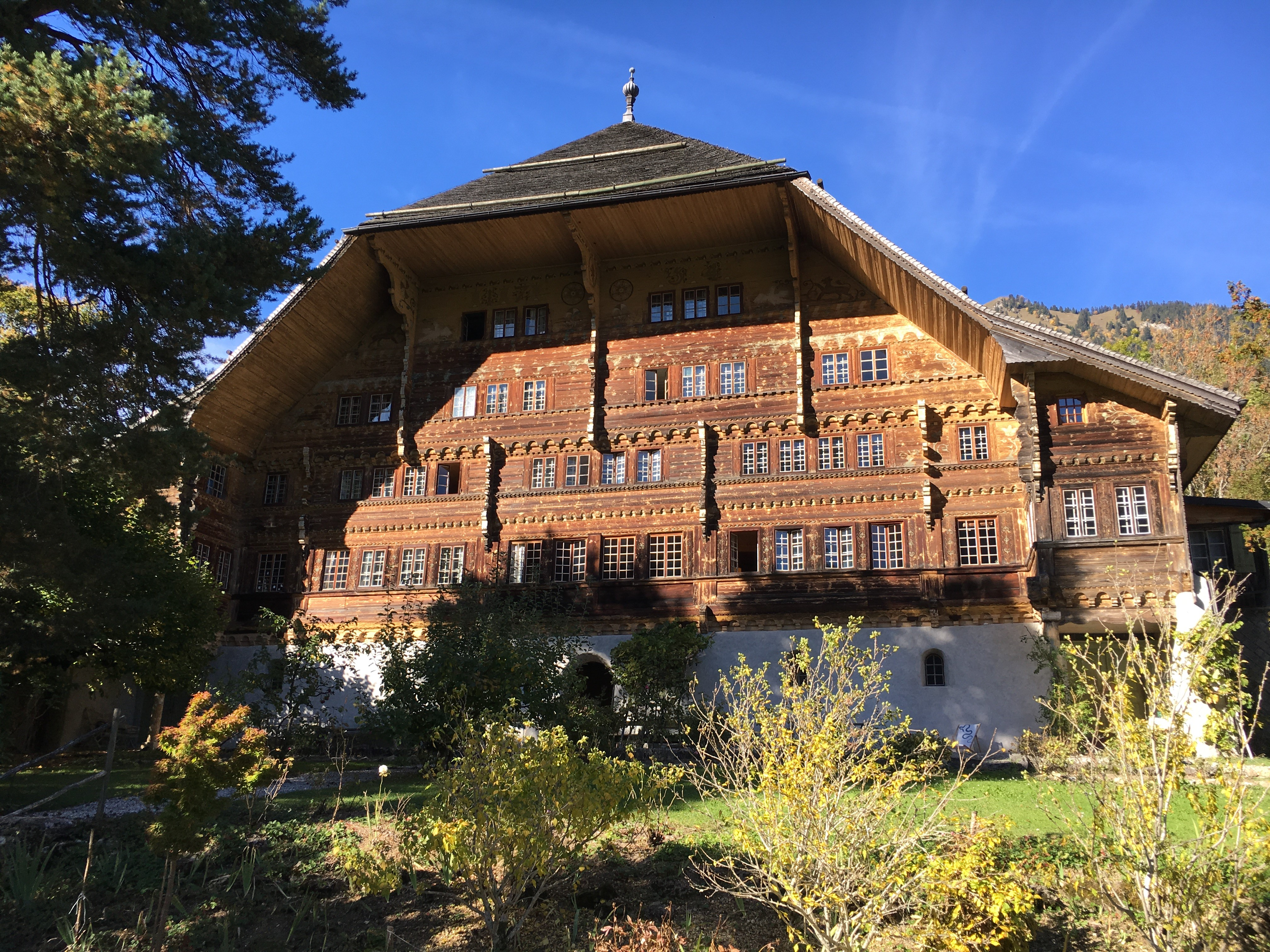
- The south façade of the Grand Chalet in 2018

- Location within Switzerland Location within Canton of Vaud
- Location: Rossinière

History
- Built: 1752–1756
- Built for: Jean-David Henchoz (1712–1758)

Site notes
- Architect(s): Jean-David Henchoz (owner), Gabriel Massard (master mason) and Joseph Genayne (master carpenter)
- Architectural style: Chalet
- Owner: Setsuko, Comtesse Klossowska de Rola

Swiss Cultural Property of National Significance

The Grand Chalet, also known as the Grand Chalet de Rossinière, Grande Demeure, Grande Maison or Chalet Balthus, is the largest historic chalet in Switzerland and possibly in the entire Alpine region. The chalet is located in Rossinière, in the French-speaking part of Switzerland. It is listed as a Swiss heritage site of national significance (1946: Classification as a monument at municipal and cantonal level. 1996: Recognition as a heritage site of national significance). The French name Le Grand Chalet means "The Big Chalet", in the sense of: The biggest house in town.

== Historical significance ==
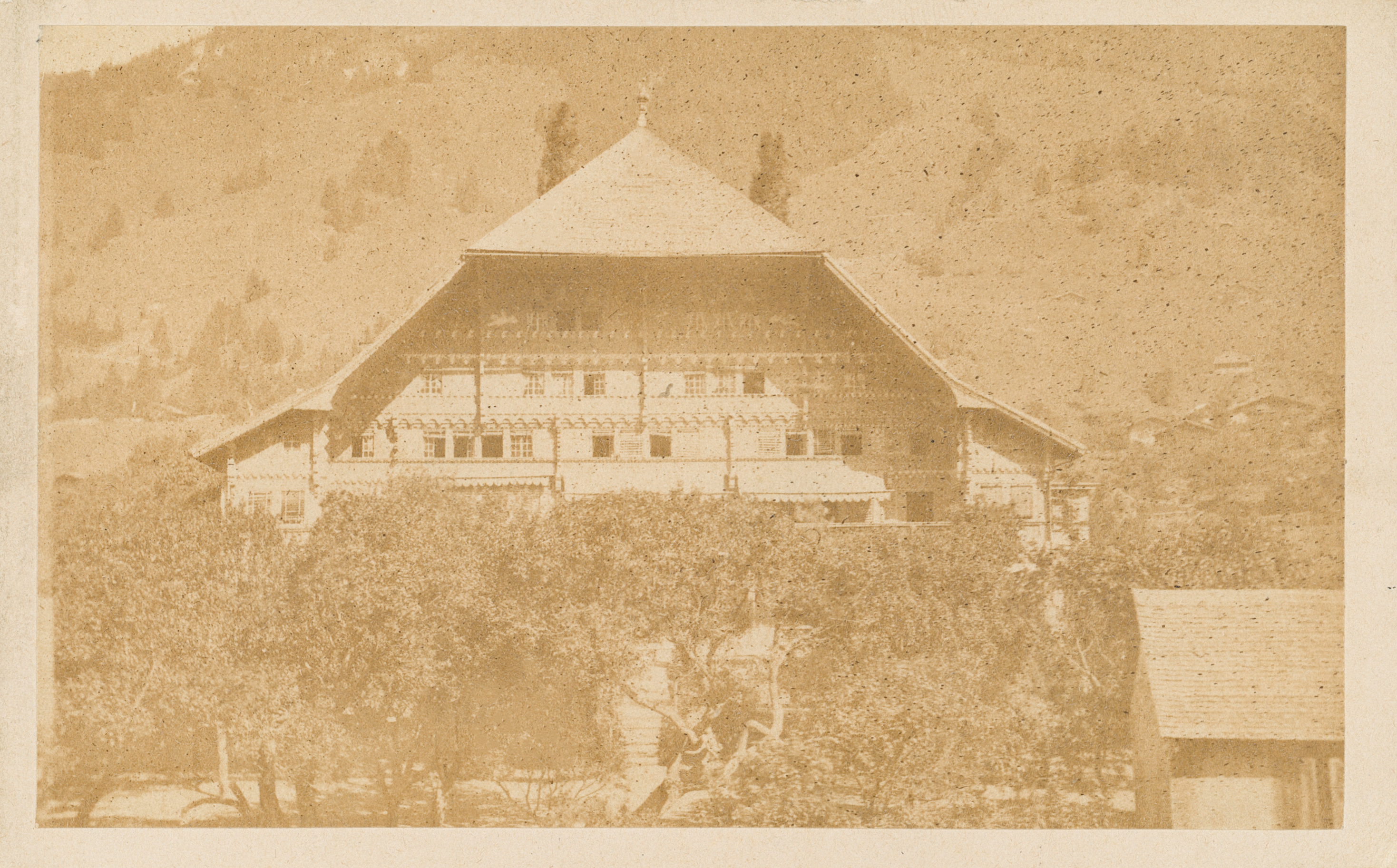
The south façade of the Grand Chalet with two of the once three poplars on the north side (visible above the roof). This is the oldest photograph of the Grand Chalet, dating from the 1860s. This carte de visite photograph is considered an absolute rarity.

Although the small municipality of Rossinière was ravaged by fire three times – in 1600, 1776 and 1855 – it boasts a remarkable cultural and architectural heritage. In addition to the Grand Chalet, these include the town hall, built in 1635, and the Maison de la Place built in 1664. Because of the risk of fire, the burnt down houses were increasingly built of stone when they were rebuilt.

In Rossinière, the most beautiful residences were built by skilled and mostly local craftsmen for wealthy people who held important social positions within the community.

The local authorities of Rossinière and the authorities of the Canton of Vaud had long recognised that the Grand Chalet was an exceptional and unique building. If it were built of stone, it would be called a castle. The responsible cantonal archaeologist, Louis Bosset, stated laconically when classifying the Grand Chalet as a cantonal monument in 1946:

"The Grand Chalet is well known enough that it seems superfluous to describe it. Its value, except for a few interior fittings, both from an archaeological point of view and that of Vaudois Alpine folklore, fully justifies its classification as a historic monument."

— Louis Bosset, the cantonal archaeologist of the Canton of Vaud, on the importance of the Grand Chalet as a historic monument and the reason why he didn't even consider it necessary to prepare a corresponding dossier with a detailed description of the Grand Chalet and conclusive justification for his decision

== Architectural uniqueness ==
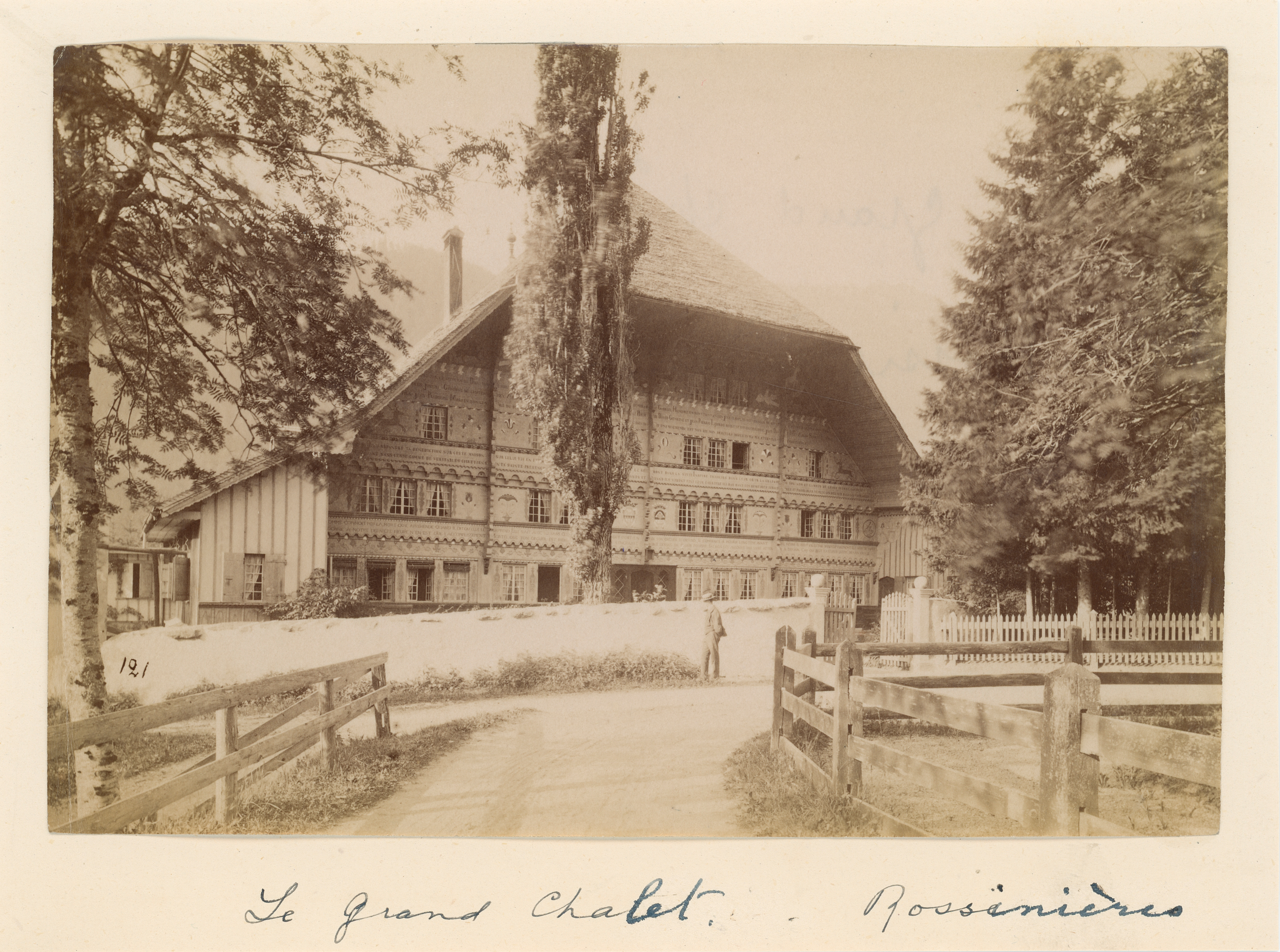
A rare photograph from the 1870s, showing the last of the once three poplars in front of the entrance of the Grand Chalet.

The Grand Chalet is one of the oldest and grandest chalets ever built in Switzerland, dating to the mid-18th century. The house was originally built for the local governor and curial (court clerk) during the time of the Bernese rule, Jean-David Henchoz (1712–1758), who was also a solicitor and farmer as well as a cheese and timber entrepreneur. In short: He was the most powerful man in the entire area. Accordingly, size mattered to him. Jean-David Henchoz played a key role in the design of the Grand Chalet. Some sources of information even list him as the architect. This was not uncommon at the time. Typically, the owner and the master carpenter were jointly responsible for the chalet plans.

The Grand Chalet is considered one of the largest wooden houses ever built in the Alps. In one chronicle it is described as a "castle with a turtle shell". The painter Balthus spent the last decades of his life in the Grand Chalet. Even today, the Grand Chalet is still inhabited by his widow, Setsuko, Comtesse Klossowska de Rola, as well as other members of his family.

"The Grand Chalet, a caravel washed up on a mountain, a Shinto temple. With its architecture in white wood and balconies of lace."

— Claude Roy on the Grand Chalet

== Overview of architectural features ==
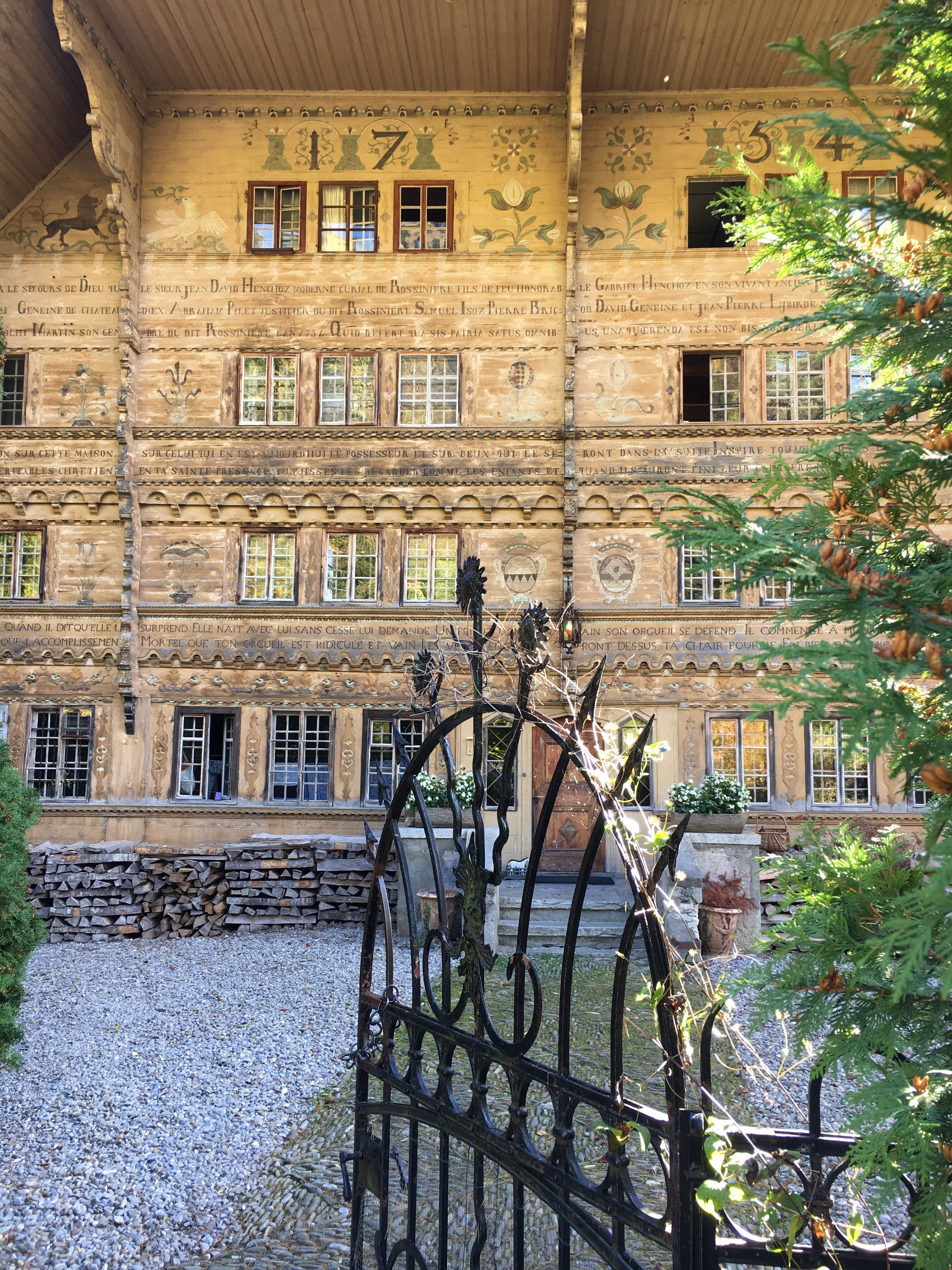
The entrance of the Grand Chalet in 2018 with the date 1754 painted on the façade, the year the roof was completed. The roof framework was laid on 27 July. The roof was built under the direction of three roofers from Montbovon from 4 November to 12 December 1754. Due to its size and slope, the Grand Chalet required a roof made of nailed shingles. At that time, it was common practice to weight the shingles down with stones, as these handmade iron nails were expensive. However, money was no issue in the construction of the Grand Chalet.

The Grand Chalet was built between 1752 and 1756. The masonry base is the work of Gabriel Massard. He and his workers built a special open-air lime kiln, specifically for the production of lime and gypsum for the masonry of the Grand Chalet. The wooden structure is the work of the master carpenter Joseph Genayne (also Geneyne or Geneine) of Château-d'Œx and his carpenters. Joseph Genayne evidently had a profound knowledge of structural engineering. The numerous partition walls stabilise the building and prevent the exterior walls from sagging. The friezes and painted decorations are by Jean Raynaud and his wife Marie Perronet of Château-d'Œx. It took 43 days to complete the painted decorations, including verses, inscriptions, coats of arms and frescoes depicting flowers and symbolic animals.

=== Scale and dimensions ===
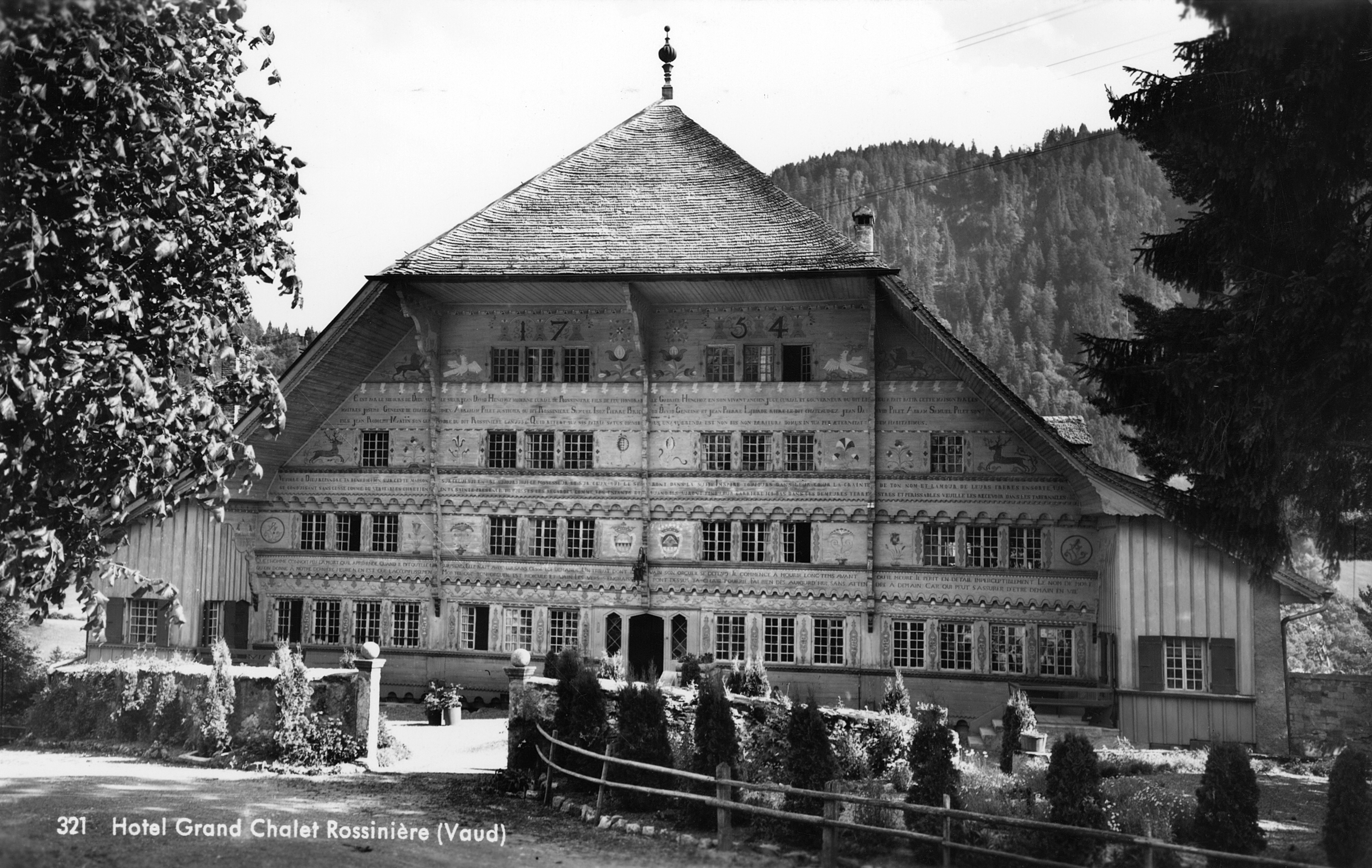
The north façade of the Grand Chalet on a postcard in the early second half of the 20th century. In general, it can be said that the architecture of the Grand Chalet is no different from other chalets in the area, except that everything is simply a few sizes larger. The two ornate copper roof finials are each three meters high.

The Grand Chalet surpasses all the superlatives of all other chalets in Switzerland. It is the largest chalet in the entire country and it is the largest inhabited wooden single-family home in Switzerland. The Grand Chalet consists of: 500 m^{2} of floor space, 60 rooms on five floors, 113 windows and a 2,800-letter dedication painted on the façade, partly consisting of verses from the works of Antoinette du Ligier de la Garde Deshoulières. The other inscriptions express the deep Christian faith of Jean-David Henchoz, the first owner of the house. Some of the thought-provoking verses are: "How little man knows the death he fears", "Pride is ridiculous and vain", "Death is born with him", "He begins to die long before he dies", "The worms will grow fat on your rotting flesh", "Do well today, without waiting until tomorrow" and "Because who can be sure of being alive tomorrow".

The first owner of the Grand Chalet, Jean-David Henchoz, had himself immortalised on the north façade of his house with the following inscription: "It is by the help of God that the Sieur Jean-David Henchoz, the current curial [court clerk] of Rossinière, son of the late honourable Gabriel Henchoz, in his lifetime former curial and governor of the said place, had this house built." Followed by the sentence (original in Latin): "What does it matter what country you are in, what is the one thing that everyone should seek is a house that will not be destroyed, in which we will dwell for eternity."

==== Wooden architecture and an oversized scale ====
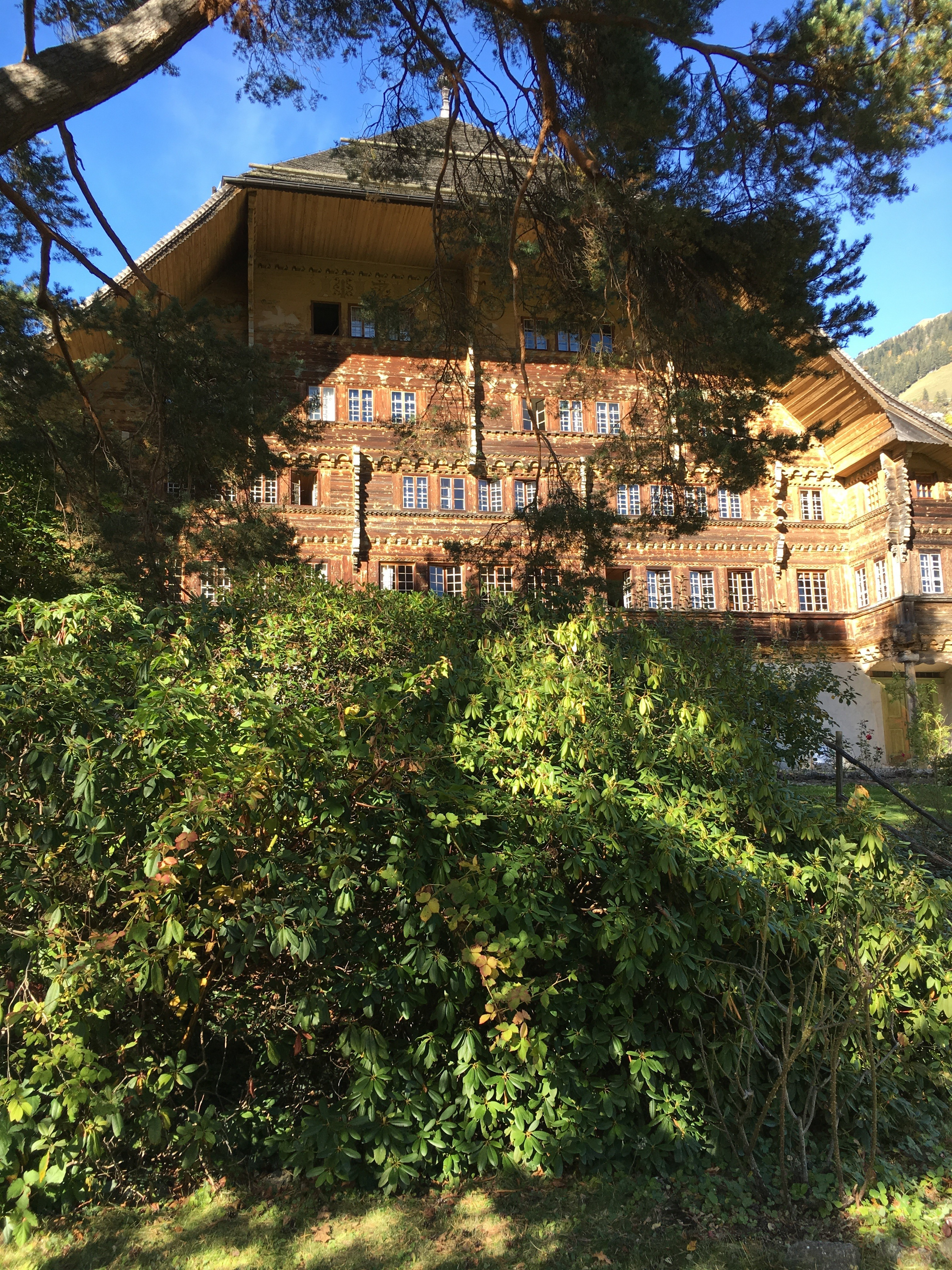
The south façade of the Grand Chalet in 2018. Wherever possible, wood was used in the construction, as the builder of the Grand Chalet had extensive forests at his disposal. Even the chimneys were made of wood. The planks therefore had to fit together perfectly to avoid flying sparks. Wooden chimneys were nothing unusual at that time. However, in the 19th century they were banned.

The wooden structure of the Grand Chalet is made entirely of local Alpine wood, with elaborately carved balconies and a sloping roof characteristic of traditional Swiss architecture. To build the chalet it required 750 m^{3} of logs, or more than 200 spruce trees, and 950 m^{2} of shingles for the roof, or 70 more spruce trees. The shingles of the Grand Chalet are 45 centimetres long, 13 centimetres wide and 8 millimetres thick, which represents approximately 225 shingles per square metre. When the roof of the Grand Chalet was re-roofed in 1994, over 200,000 shingles were needed. In total, almost 1,000 m^{3} of wood were cut in the owner's forests for the construction of the Grand Chalet. On the west side, however, a stone wall protects the façade of the Grand Chalet, which is exposed to the weathering of the west wind. The south façade is the largest façade of the Grand Chalet. It measures 27.0 meters by 19.5 meters with a depth of 15.0 meters.

But early on, there were voices that argued the Grand Chalet was too big. In 1848, the building tax assessors wrote in their report on the Grand Chalet: "It is a building of gigantic size, with numerous rooms, many of which, however, are unheated. The roof is expensive to maintain. The rental value and the selling price are highly illusory, since there is no possibility of renting out a similar building. It follows from all this that the market value bears no relation to the income, since one could achieve more with less money."

"Too grand for 'Gemütlichkeit', it is perhaps best described as an example of Helvetian gothic."

— Nicholas Foulkes on the Grand Chalet

=== Cheese-making history ===
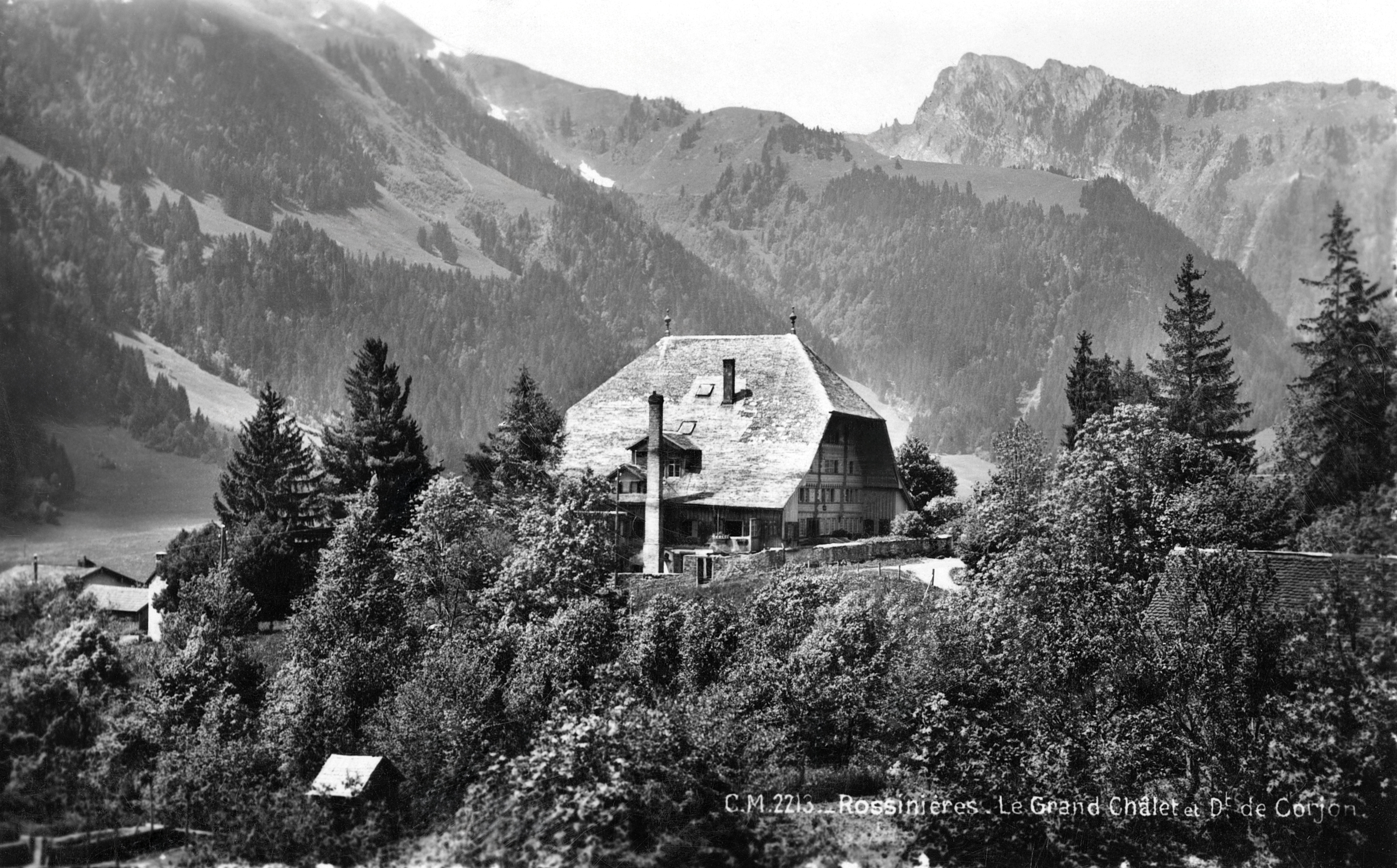
The Grand Chalet from the northeast with the large, subsequently built chimney, which was demolished in 1974. In the background the Dent de Corjon.

The Grand Chalet was originally designed not only as a residential building for two families, but also as a regional cheese warehouse and trading center, reflecting the economic significance of dairy production in the area. This also explains the extraordinary size of the house, especially the cellar, where up to 600 cheese wheels could be stored, mainly coming from the L'Étivaz valley. And this also explains why Jean-David Henchoz was called the Cheese Baron.

However, Jean-David Henchoz was only able to enjoy his mansion for two years before succumbing to an illness in 1758 at the age of 46. With him, his project of building a major regional cheese center also died. The other cheesemongers settled elsewhere in the Gruyère District. His widow Marie-Madeleine Henchoz, née Pilet, and his brother Abram were unable to continue his work. Their business remained comparatively modest.

== Conversion into a hotel ==
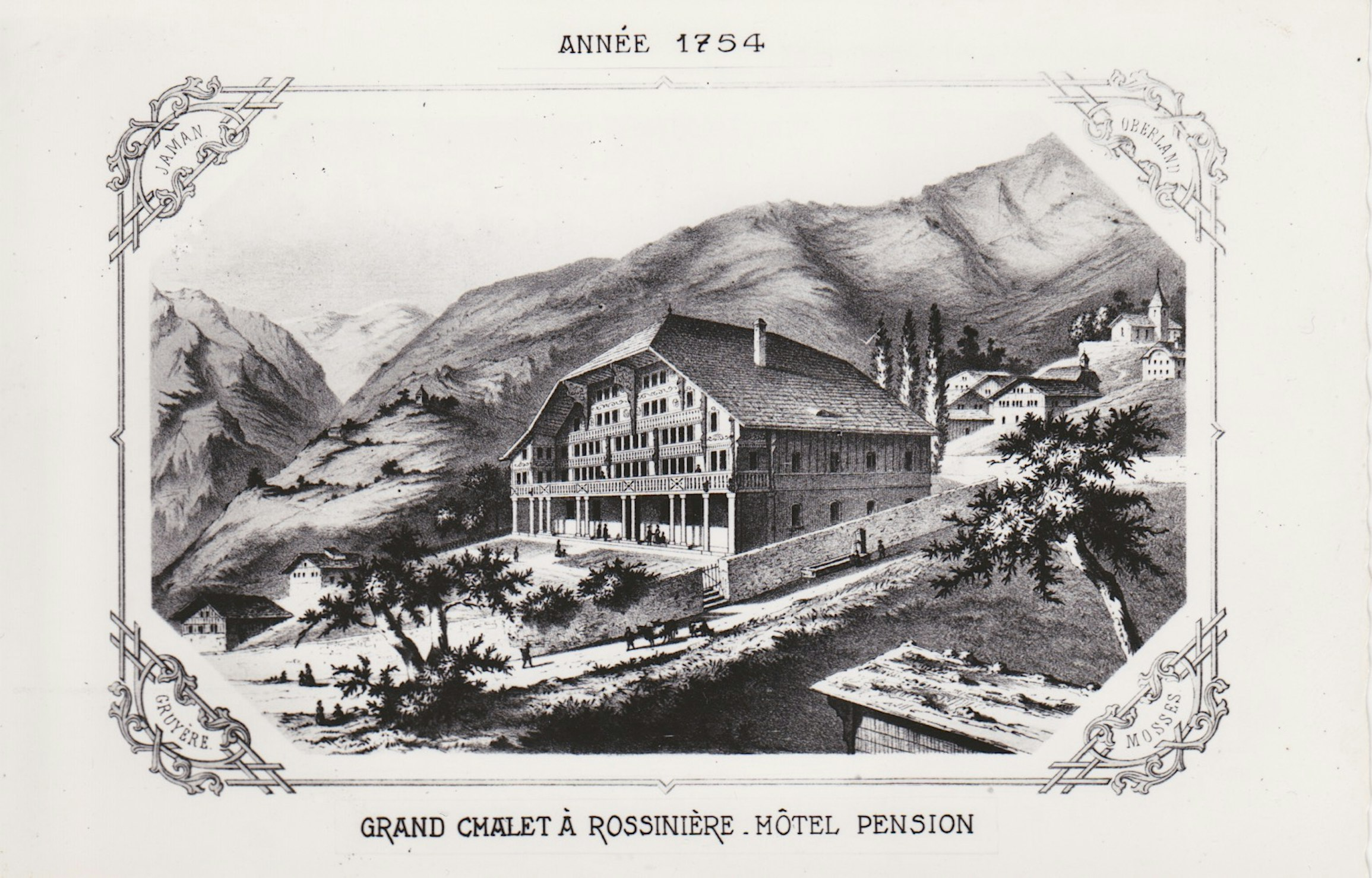
An advertising engraving, showing the Hôtel-Pension du Grand Chalet in the 1850s. The gallery on the south side, added in the 19th century, was later dismantled. The three iconic poplars on the north side are visible (the inscription "Année 1754" refers to the house's construction period).

In 1852, the Grand Chalet was turned into a hotel by Rodolphe Henchoz de Loës, a great-grandson of Jean-David Henchoz. At that time, the Grand Chalet was inhabited by only one member of the family Henchoz. Most likely it was the pastor Charles Scholl. Charles Scholl was a grandson of Gabriel Henchoz, who was the second brother of Jean-David Henchoz. It was during the course of the conversion into a hotel that Rodolphe Henchoz de Loës renamed the house, previously known as Grande Maison, first to Pension Henchoz and then to Hôtel-Pension du Grand Chalet.

Rodolphe Henchoz de Loës recognised the signs of the times. He wanted to take advantage of the potential of Switzerland's natural beauty, as already praised by Johann Wolfgang von Goethe on his travels there in 1775, 1779 and 1797. Johann Wolfgang von Goethe's widely read reports made Switzerland appear as a real place of longing. In addition, with the development of the railway and steam shipping, the travel activity of the European upper class had increased rapidly. With the Grand Chalet, Rodolphe Henchoz de Loës also had an ideal house, which, due to its size, was ideally suited to being converted into a hotel. The Hôtel-Pension du Grand Chalet was one of the first hotels in the area.

=== Renovation and early operation ===
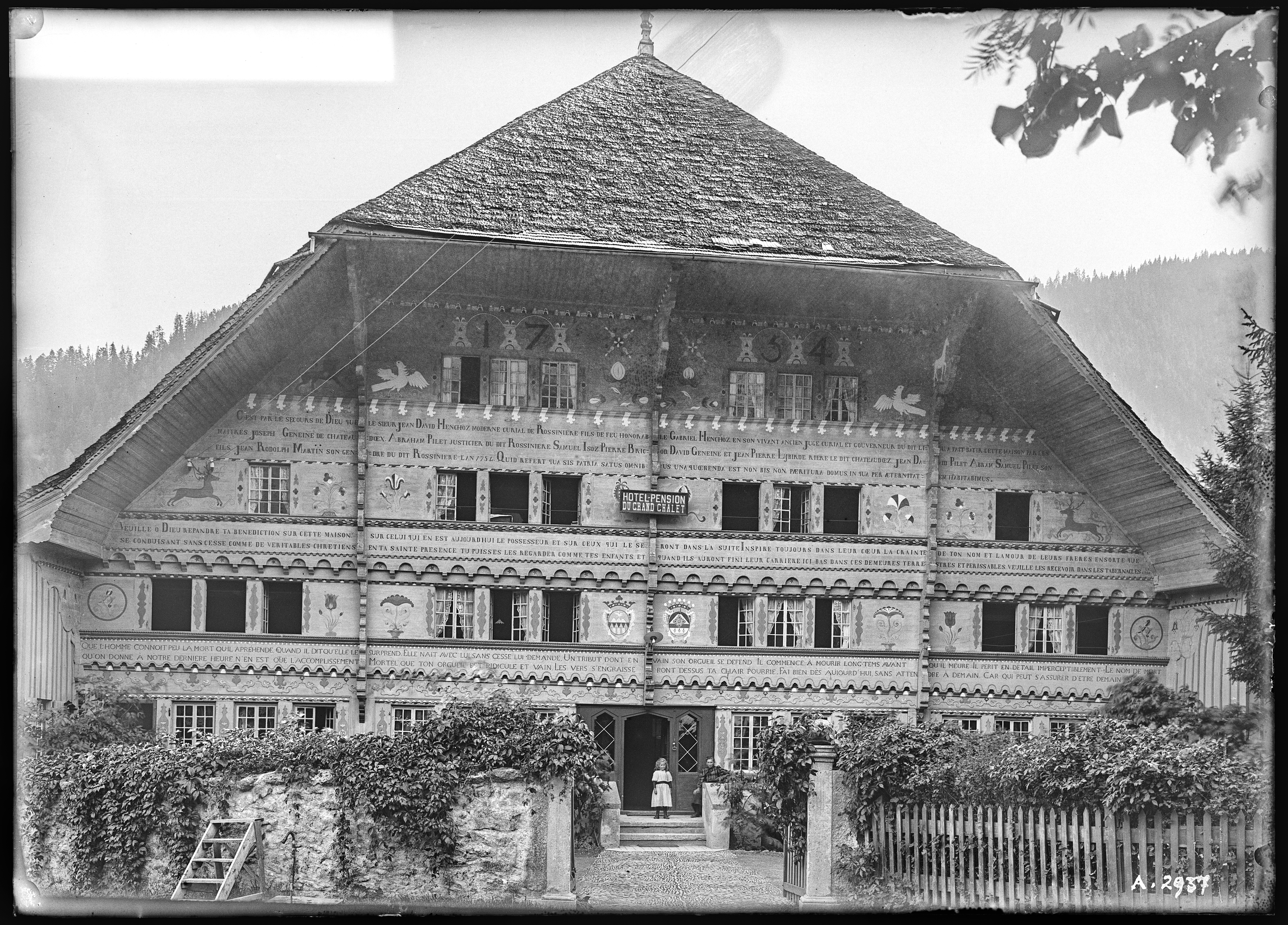
The main entrance on the north side of the Hôtel-Pension du Grand Chalet, with the hotel sign above the door (in the middle of the façade). Since the house was built for two families, there were originally two entrance doors, which were replaced by one large door when the Grand Chalet was converted into a hotel in 1852. Photographed by Max van Berchem in 1899.

To improve the Grand Chalet's use as a hotel, significant changes were made. These included the construction of a gallery on the south side (a large balcony running the length of the façade), the removal of two large open fireplaces in the kitchens and the conversion of the basement rooms on the ground floor (the cheese cellars) into a dining room with large windows and French doors. Some of these changes were later reversed during further renovations. At this time, the painted decorations on the façade were also restored for the first time.

Contrary to the exterior appearance, the rooms of the Grand Chalet are mostly rather small and simple, the corridors narrow and the ceilings low. Because of this, you don't notice the Grand Chalet's size inside. You never feel like you are in a big house. The large number of rooms was an advantage for the hotel operation. Many room doors still bear the original hotel room numbers. However, due to the difficulty of heating the house, it can be assumed that not all rooms of the house were actually used.

Despite all the structural changes that were made over time for the hotel operation, until the hotel closed in 1976 there was only one bathroom on the ground floor for hotel guests, but over 40 chamber pots.

==== Restoration of original features ====
The most visible structural changes on the south side, the gallery, the large windows and the French doors, were only dismantled after the change of ownership and the end of the hotel business in 1976. Thus, the original condition of the Grand Chalet's façade was restored. At this time, the interior was also gradually renovated, with great emphasis on authenticity.

=== Notable hoteliers ===
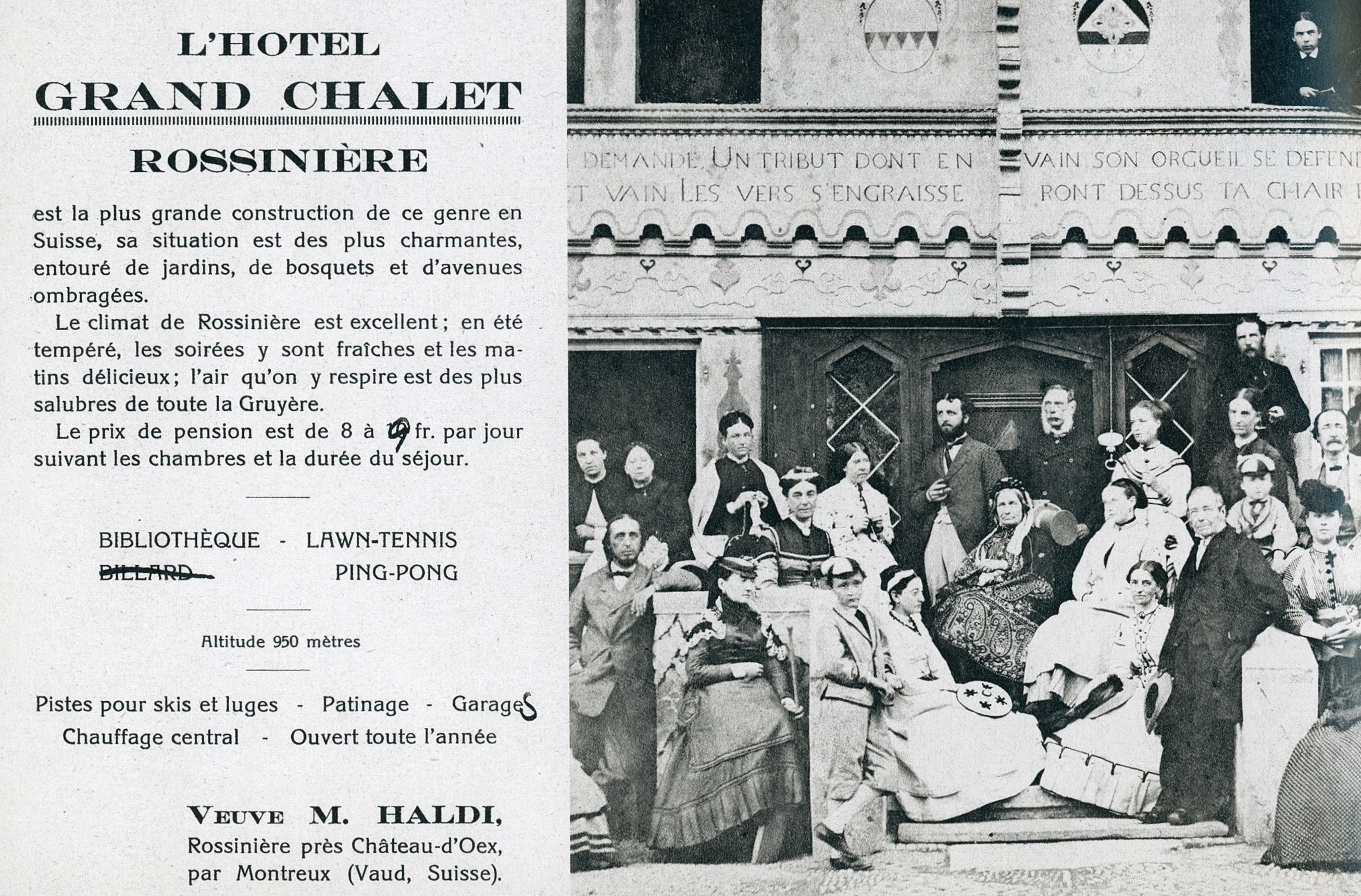
Brochure of the Hotel Grand Chalet from the early 20th century, showing the hotelier's widow M. Haldi, and at this time hotelier in her own right (sitting in the middle on an armchair), surrounded by her family and staff in front of the main entrance.

The hotel quickly became very popular. It was the time of the last years of the era of the Grand Tour. Holidays in the Swiss Alps were in favour of the high society, especially among the British, Americans, Russians and Australians, some of whom travelled to Rossinière with their servants and stayed at the Hôtel-Pension du Grand Chalet for several months. The hotel was deliberately designed to meet the needs of the British upper class, the largest group of tourists and permanent tenants of the Grand Chalet. The strong British currency, the Pound sterling, made living in Switzerland extremely attractive for British guests. The British aristocrats were loyal guests for generations. However, the most notable hotel guests of the Grand Chalet were all French such as: Léon Gambetta, Alfred Dreyfus, Édouard Lockroy and Victor Hugo. Victor Hugo, Édouard Lockroy and his wife Alice Lockroy, née Lehaene (1847–1928), who was the widowed daughter-in-law of Victor Hugo (widow of Charles Hugo), and their children and stepchildren, respectively, Georges Victor-Hugo and Jeanne Hugo, were staying at the Grand Chalet at the same time in August 1883. The Grand Chalet remained in the possession of the family Henchoz until 1875.

The Grand Chalet then came into the possession of the family Haldi. The hotelier's widow, in particular, was considered a business-minded person. It was probably she who changed the name of the hotel from Hôtel-Pension du Grand Chalet to the shorter name and English spelling Hotel Grand Chalet. The widow M. Haldi ran the hotel from the beginning of the 20th century until her death in 1941. Then, the municipality took over the management of the hotel. The first hotel guest after World War II was a certain M. Ware. Instead of checking out after his stay, he bought the Grand Chalet straight away. However, his business success as a hotelier was limited.

==== Devenish and Scott era ====
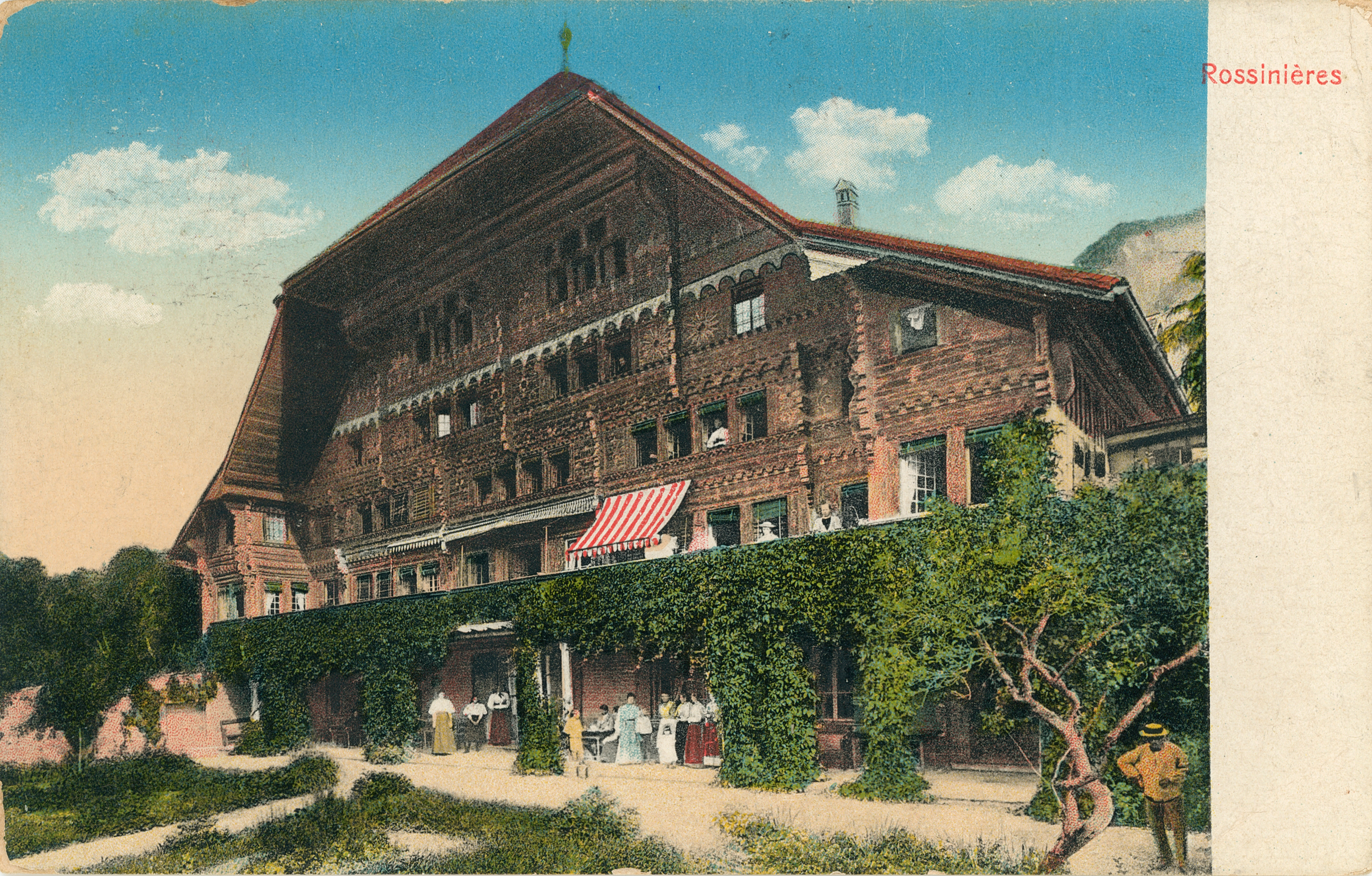
The south façade of the Hotel Grand Chalet on a postcard from the pre-World War I period. In 1908, Phyllis Scott, who later became co-hotelier, came to the Grand Chalet for the first time as an 8-year-old. She lived permanently in the Grand Chalet with her mother and sister. During World War I, however, they lived in England, but returned in 1925. Among the proud possessions retained by Antoine Devenish, the last hotelier, after selling the Grand Chalet in 1976 was the hotel's guest book, which contains many historical entries, such as those by Victor Hugo and his family.

It was not until Antoine Devenish, called Tony, and his business partner Phyllis Scott purchased the Grand Chalet in 1951 that the hotel's commercial success returned. Antoine Devenish, who came from South Africa, was already familiar with the Hotel Grand Chalet. He had first visited it in 1928, as a twelve-year-old. Phyllis Scott was also already very familiar with the Grand Chalet. She had been a regular guest and even a permanent tenant at the Hotel Grand Chalet since before World War I. The families Devenish and Scott already knew each other. They were close friends. Antoine Devenish and Phyllis Scott reopened the Hotel Grand Chalet on Easter 1952.

Antoine Devenish and his business partner shared the workload, with Phyllis Scott primarily responsible for the food. The kitchen was her domain, for which she was widely known and appreciated. The most striking architectural change during the Devenish and Scott era at the Grand Chalet are the dormer windows installed in 1953. Furthermore, a new kitchen, an oil heating and running water in the hotel rooms were installed. Part of the roof was also replaced.

The Hotel Grand Chalet has always had many regular guests. In addition to primarily British and American guests, there were also Swiss guests, particularly from Basel, who enjoyed practicing their English with the other Anglo-Saxon guests, as English was the unofficial language at the Grand Chalet. In the afternoon, many people were having tea on the gallery or the veranda below, or in the parlor. And everyone was chatting in English.

=== British influence and expansion ===
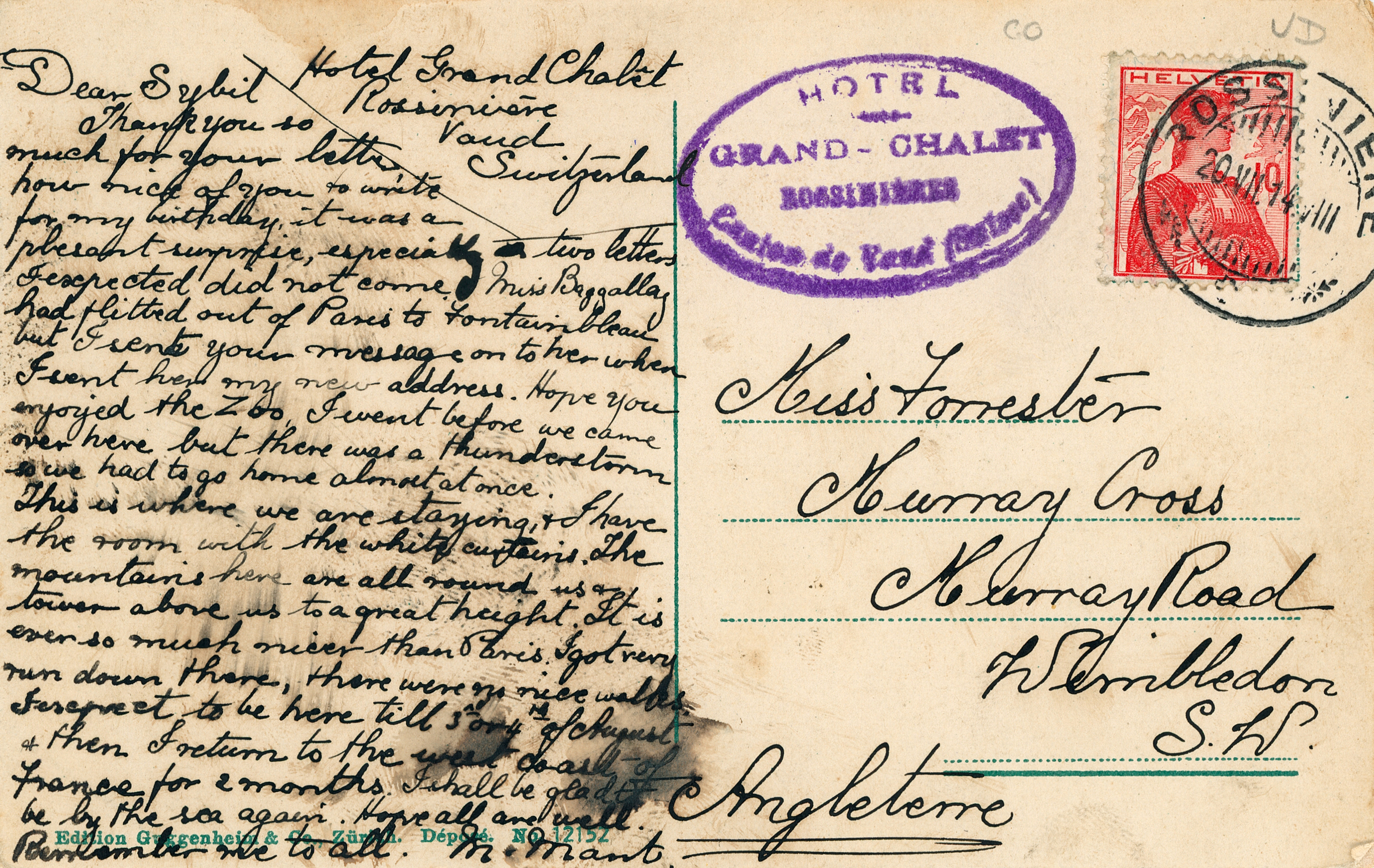
A postcard from 1914 with greetings from the Hotel Grand Chalet to Wimbledon. The postcard is postmarked 20 July 1914, eight days before the outbreak of World War I. During the war, British internees were housed in the Grand Chalet.

In the second half of the 19th century, it was none other than Queen Victoria herself who was responsible for the first great boom in British tourism in the Swiss Alps. It was the queen who drew the attention of the British upper class to the Swiss mountains with her visit to Switzerland in August and September 1868. Queen Victoria's five-week stay left its mark not only on the monarch herself, but also on the Swiss tourism industry. The Bernese Oberland, especially Gstaad and the surrounding villages, including Rossinière, also benefited from this boom.

The queen insisted on travelling incognito as the rather lowly Countess of Kent, one of her many titles. However, it was not exactly a brilliantly kept secret, as more or less half of Europe knew about the trip. Emperor Napoleon III even placed a train at her disposal for her travels on the continent.

==== First the queen, then the railway ====
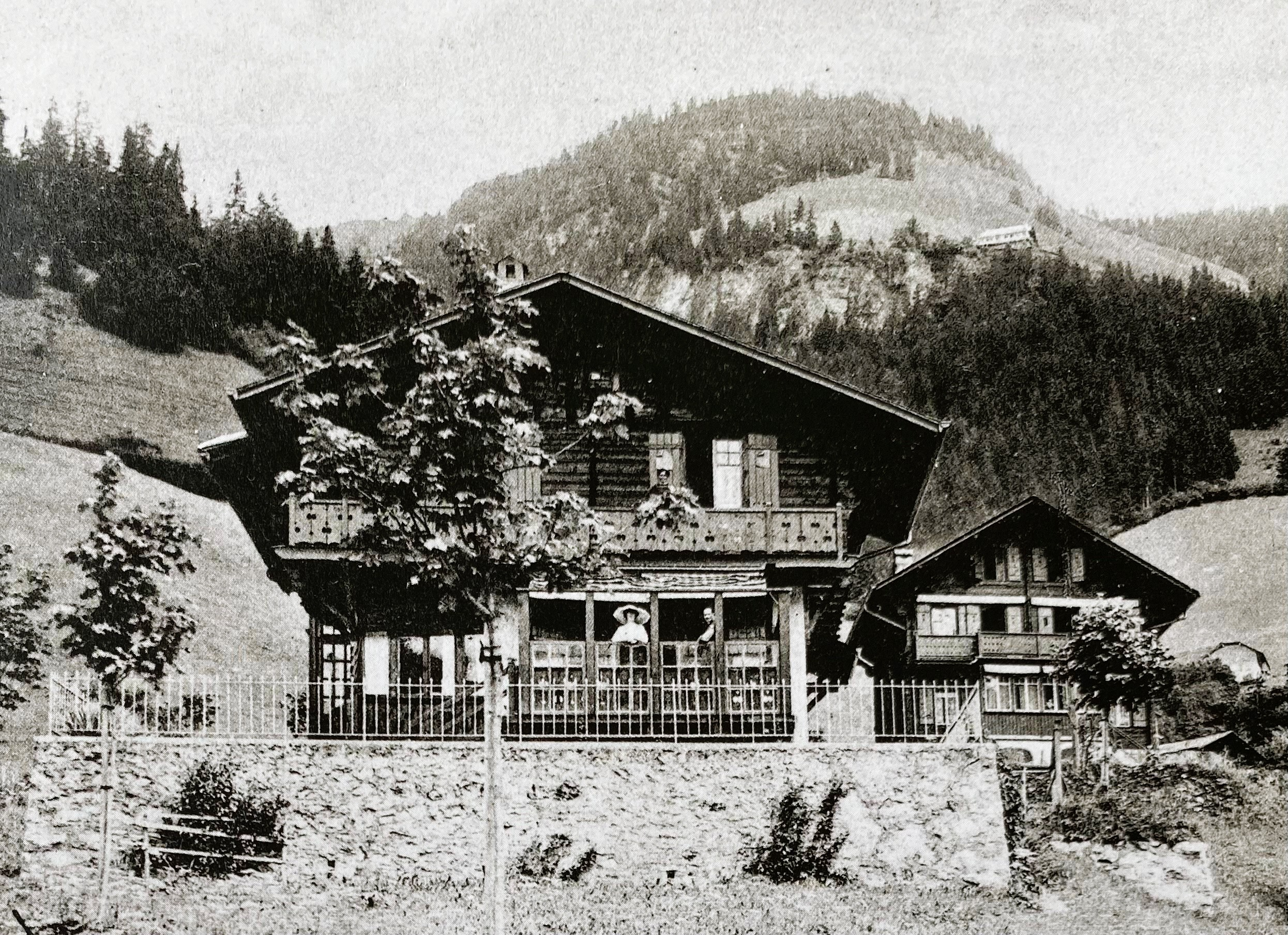
The Petit Chalet and the Chalet des Tilleuils: The two outbuildings of the Hotel Grand Chalet were built in 1912.

The construction of the railway line in 1904, now called the GoldenPass Express, led to an unexpected second tourism boom in the region. This was also the time when the Hotel Grand Chalet introduced its winter season. The large number of British tourists made winter sports popular in the region. Many new hotels and guesthouses were built. Existing hotels and guesthouses also expanded their capacity by building annexes or outbuildings. As a result of this tourism boom, the two outbuildings of the Hotel Grand Chalet were built to expand guest capacity: The Petit Chalet and the Chalet des Tilleuls. Both chalets were built in 1912. Just one year later, 14 kilometers from Rossinière, the Grand old Lady of the Bernese Oberland hotel industry opened its doors: The Gstaad Palace.

==== The Grand Chalet as the Swiss chalet archetype ====
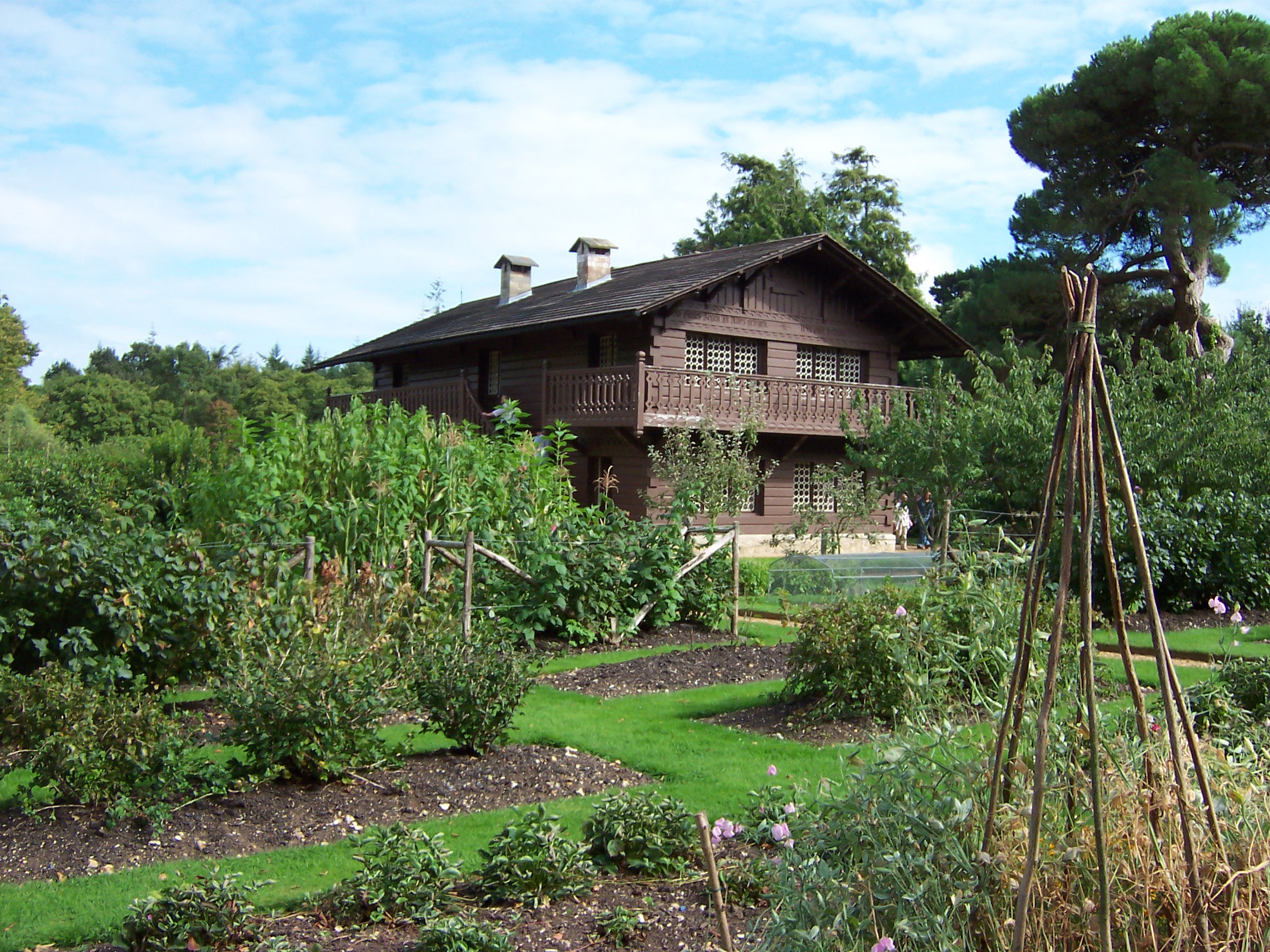
The Royal Swiss Cottage on the grounds of Osborne House.

For the hotel guests, the Grand Chalet became the epitome of the Swiss chalet. British guests, in particular, took a liking to the chalet architecture, and it became fashionable to have a Swiss chalet, which they called a "Swiss cottage", in the spacious parks of British stately homes. Queen Victoria and her husband Prince Albert had a Swiss cottage built for their children on the grounds of Osborne House between 1853 and 1854. This Royal Swiss Cottage became the most famous Swiss chalet outside Switzerland.

The most famous connection of the name Swiss cottage in the United Kingdom, however, is with the district Swiss Cottage in the London Borough of Camden. The district is named after an inn that was first called The Swiss Tavern, built in 1804 in the style of a Swiss chalet on the site of a former toll-keeper's house. It was later renamed The Swiss Inn and, in the early 20th century, The Swiss Cottage.

=== Balthus comes for tea ===
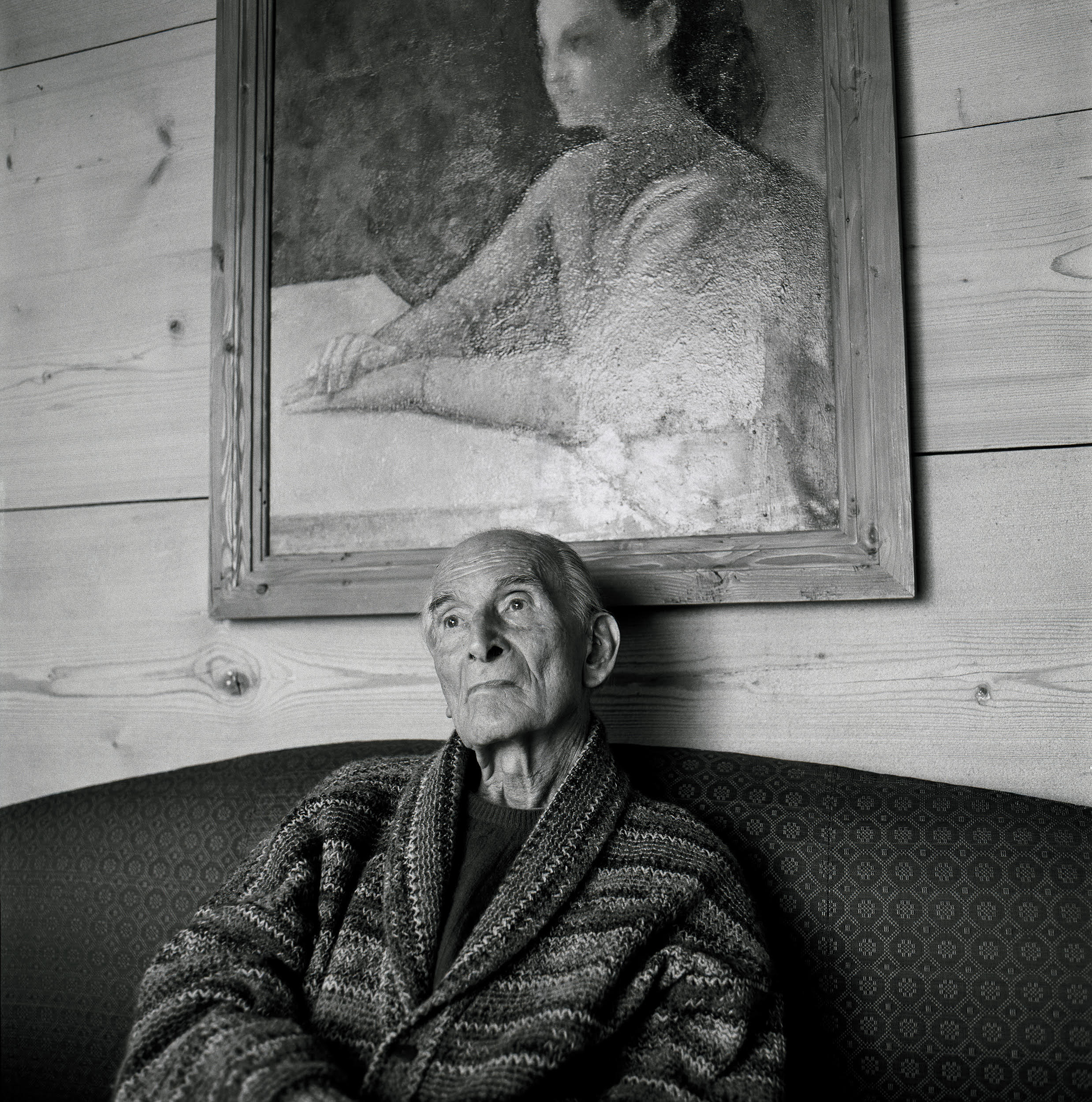
Balthus at the Grand Chalet in 2000, portrait photograph by Oliver Mark.

In 1976, another sophisticated figure came to the Hotel Grand Chalet: Balthasar, Comte Klossowski de Rola, called Balthus, the world-renowned painter. At that time, he and his wife Setsuko, Comtesse Klossowska de Rola, were visiting friends in Gstaad who suggested having tea at the Hotel Grand Chalet. The house so fascinated Balthus that the French-Polish artist immediately considered purchasing the Grand Chalet, which was up for sale at the time. His wife Setsuko agreed and added: "I would like to live here." Setsuko vividly remembered this moment and said: "When Balthus said that he was interested in buying the Grand Chalet, the owner, Antoine Devenish, almost fainted. He couldn't believe that someone was finally genuinely interested." The hotelier had been trying to sell the Grand Chalet since 1971. Before Balthus, many potential buyers were put off by the sheer size of the wooden structure and the associated renovation and maintenance costs. Two days after Balthus's first visit to the Grand Chalet, the purchase was negotiated and agreed upon. Ultimately, at the end of his life, Balthus would never have lived in one place longer than the Grand Chalet.

Balthus would ultimately restore the great house to its former glory. Thus began the grand era of the Grand Chalet.

"I found my secret geometry here."

— Balthus on his beloved Grand Chalet. Balthus understood secret geometry as the silent order, the world of forms and the harmony of the place – something that inspires calm, creativity and introspection.

== The Balthus era ==
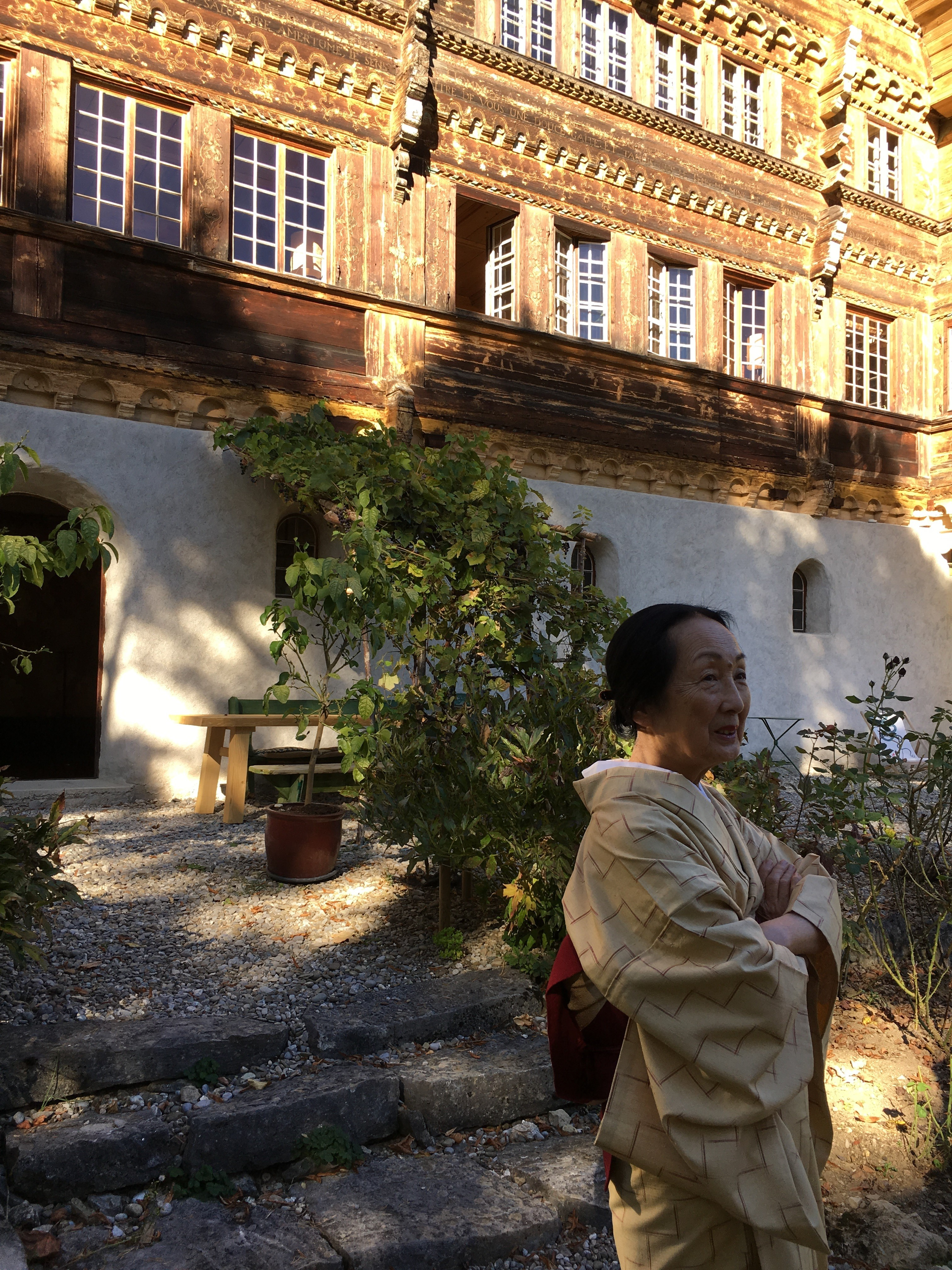
Setsuko, Comtesse Klossowska de Rola, in front of the Grand Chalet in 2018 (south side), wearing a traditional kimono. "All the wood reminded me of a traditional Japanese house", Setusko's first impression when she saw the Grand Chalet in 1976.

In 1976, Balthus acquired the Grand Chalet with a large portion of its inventory. Balthus bought the house from the last hotelier of the Grand Chalet, Antoine Devenish. He was a legendary host who organised excursions and costume parties for his guests and even went skiing with them. However, the Grand Chalet's hotel operations were out of date. There were only two hotel rooms with private bathrooms; other hotel guests had to share a bathroom on the ground floor. Major investments were needed, Devenish's health was not the best, and his children (one of whom is the photographer Sebastian Devenish) were not interested in taking over the business. For these reasons, Antoine Devenish decided to sell the Grand Chalet. Antoine Devenish was the third owner after the family Henchoz had sold the Grand Chalet in 1875.

"It was decided in one second. We came for tea and we just remained."

— Setsuko, Comtesse Klossowska de Rola, on the decision to buy the Grand Chalet in 1976

Balthus and his wife Setsuko moved into the Grand Chalet in 1977. They had previously lived in Rome, where Balthus presided over the Villa de Medici as director of the French Academy in Rome. A position to which he was appointed by the French Minister of Culture André Malraux. It was Balthus's gallerist, Pierre Matisse, who lent him the money to purchase the Grand Chalet. There was no contract. The arrangement between Balthus and Pierre Matisse was based on a gentlemen's agreement. Balthus repaid the loan with his paintings. "I will work", Balthus had said, simply.

Although Balthus and his wife Setsuko had already purchased the Castello di Montecalvello between Florence and Rome by this time, they moved to Switzerland on the advice of Balthus's doctor. The Italian sirocco wind occasionally reawakened the malaria Balthus had contracted during his military service in Morocco. And Balthus soon realised that the Swiss climate was good for him.

Balthus transformed the Grand Chalet into a private artistic retreat. He lived and worked there for nearly 25 years, welcoming artists, intellectuals, diplomats and close friends and collaborators.

The Castello di Montecalvello remained in Balthus's possession. He used it as a second residence. Upon his death, he bequeathed it to his son, Stash de Rola, who still owns it.

=== Gstaad social scene ===
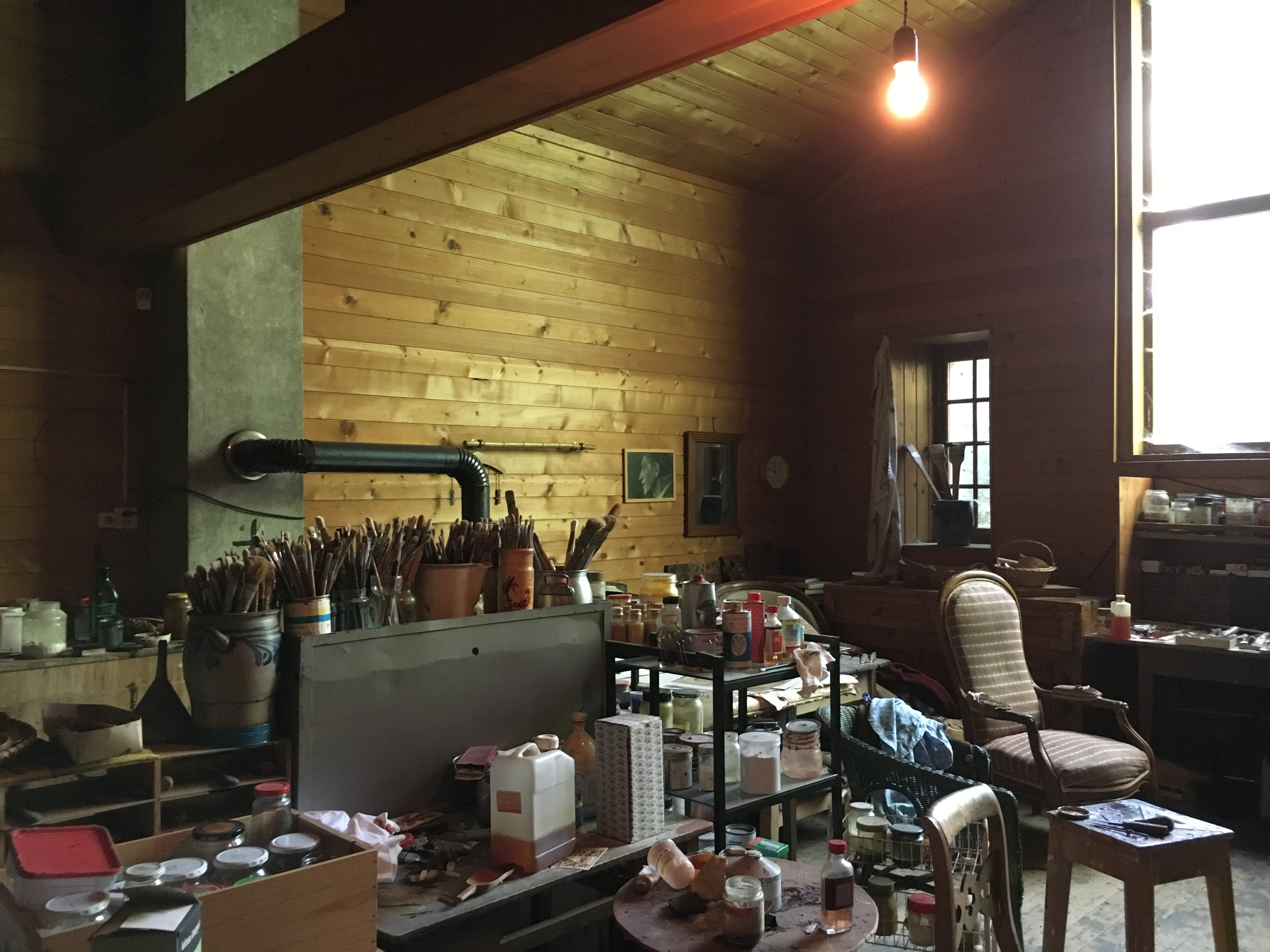
The studio of Balthus in one of the outbuildings of the Grand Chalet in 2018. Balthus died here on 18 February 2001, in the presence of his wife Setsuko and his daughter Harumi. After Balthus's death, everything was left as it was at the time of his death. On the wall hangs a photograph of Balthus's friend Alberto Giacometti. "Alberto is always with me when I paint", Balthus on Giacometti's photograph.

Over time, the Grand Chalet became a place of pilgrimage for countless admirers of Balthus's work. Many personalities visited the Grand Chalet, such as: The diplomat and senior international official Prince Sadruddhin Aga Khan, the investment banker Lord Jacob Rothschild, the photographers Kishin Shinoyama, Henri Cartier-Bresson and his wife, the portrait photographer Martine Franck, the painter Renato Guttuso, the gallerists and patrons Pierre Matisse, Alice Pauli and Ernst Beyeler, the actors Philippe Noiret, Tony Curtis, Richard Gere and Sharon Stone, the film director and photographer Wim Wenders, the film director and screenwriter Federico Fellini, the poet and essayist Claude Roy, the journalist and television presenter Gero von Boehm, the musicians Bono and Mick Jagger, the industrialists Gianni Agnelli and Gunter Sachs, the Dalai Lama, the secretary-general of the United Nations Kofi Annan, the philanthropist and art collector Simon Sainsbury, the models Elle Macpherson and Inès de La Fressange, the Italian businessman, art dealer and husband of Inès de La Fressange Luigi d'Urso (1951–2006), the fashion muse and accessory and jewellery designer Loulou de la Falaise, who was married to Thadée Klossowski de Rola (born 1944), the younger son of Balthus, and classical musicians such as Riccardo Muti and Zubin Mehta.

"Since we are near Gstaad, that gave us access to an international social life."

— Setsuko, Comtesse Klossowska de Rola, about the Gstaad Society, to which many guests of the Grand Chalet belonged.

=== David Bowie's interview with Balthus ===
Another visitor was David Bowie, who, like Joan Miró, Pablo Picasso and Alberto Giacometti, was also an art connoisseur and friend of Balthus. Bowie conducted an interview with Balthus in the summer of 1994, which was published in Modern Painters. Bowie had asked Balthus for an interview, after he had joined the editorial board of Modern Painters that same year. For Bowie, however, this was not just an interview. For him it was "the interview with the least known great painter of the 20th century", as he said. And the stage where it was to take place was the legendary Grand Chalet. Bowie's plan worked. For the interview, Balthus invited him to lunch at the Grand Chalet. Bowie also lived in Switzerland at that time, not far from Balthus. The two had met at a gallery opening for Balthus's wife Setsuko. Bowie later said he was in awe: Both of the famous artist Balthus and of the task he had set himself of conducting this interview. He said: "I was so petrified, I nearly turned back three times." The interview and the introductory text by Bowie are considered extraordinary.

=== 1993 Mouton Rothschild label ===
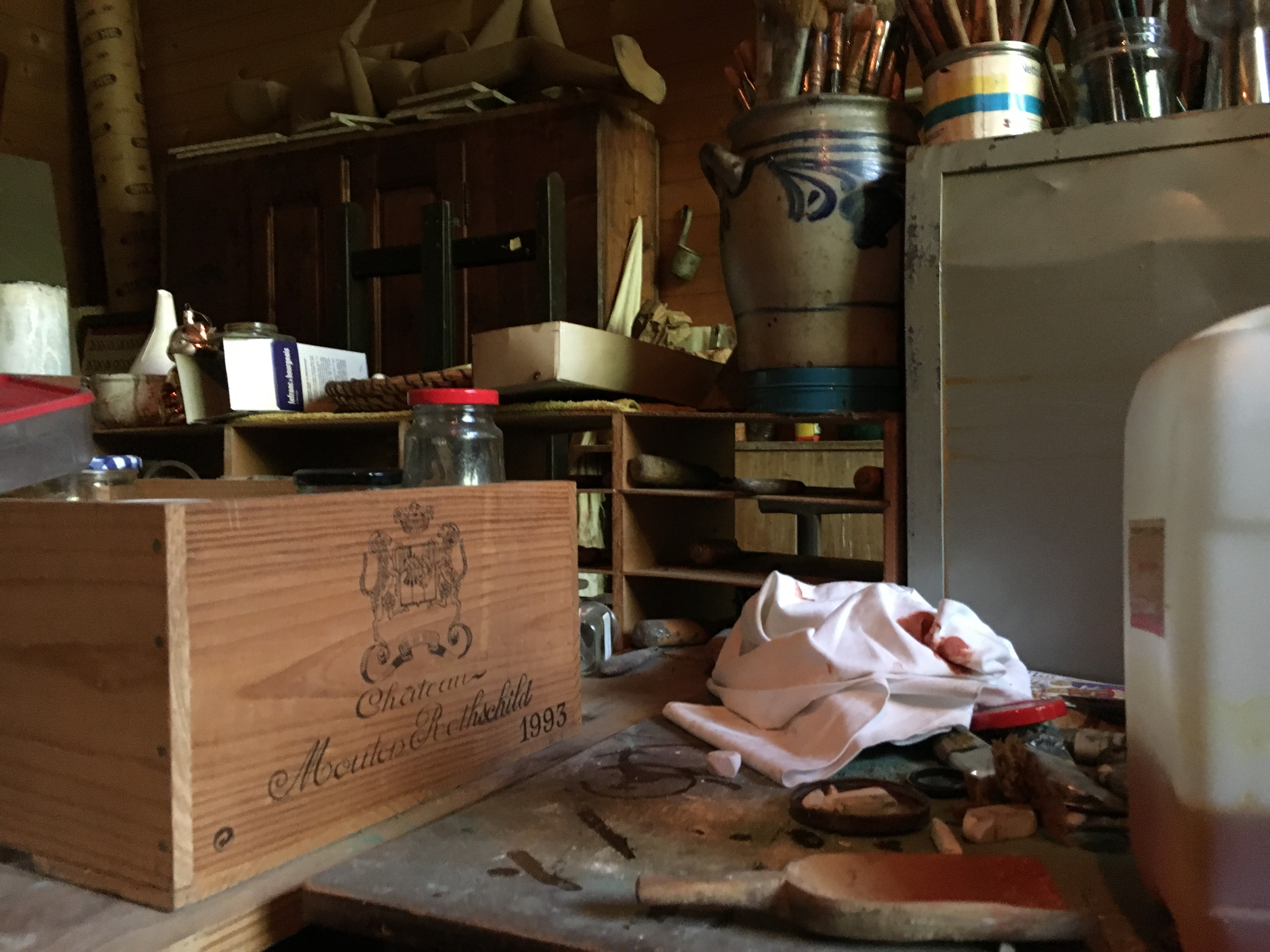
An empty case of Château Mouton Rothschild wine, vintage 1993, in Balthus's studio. Balthus designed the bottle label for this vintage. It caused a scandal in the US and became a collector's item.

Philippine Mathilde Camille, Baroness de Rothschild, was another friend and regular guest at the Grand Chalet. The baroness often stayed in Switzerland, usually residing at the family-owned Château de Pregny, near Geneva. From there, it was not far to Rossinière. Balthus also knew this area very well. After World War II, he had lived for some time in the Villa Diodati, also near Geneva.

For the Baroness de Rothschild's winery, Château Mouton Rothschild, Balthus had designed the bottle label for the 1993 vintage. The design depicts a nude reclining nymphet. However, the label caused a scandal in the US and was banned there. Since it was the Baroness de Rothschild personally who had approved the bottle label for the 1993 vintage Château Mouton Rothschild, it was also the baroness who made the decision to withdraw the label from the US market when she heard of complaints about it. The interesting fact, however, is that the label was approved for use in the US by the Treasury Department's Bureau of Alcohol, Tobacco, Firearms and Explosives. The result was that for the US market the label was made with a blank space where the image should have been. Both versions of the 1993 vintage are now extremely sought after by collectors.

=== Richard Gere's interview with Balthus ===
The last memorable interview Balthus gave also took place at the Grand Chalet. Like David Bowie in 1994, the interviewer was a global star: Richard Gere. For this interview, Gere travelled to Rossinière in December 2000 and spent two days at the Grand Chalet. It was Verde Visconti (born 1969), a cousin of the director Luchino Visconti (he was her great-granduncle), who introduced the two to each other many years ago. Nine weeks after this interview, Balthus died in his studio in Rossinière on 18 February 2001. As if he had anticipated it, Gere called the interview "The Farewell". The interview was published in the July 2001 issue of Vogue.

=== Legacy ===
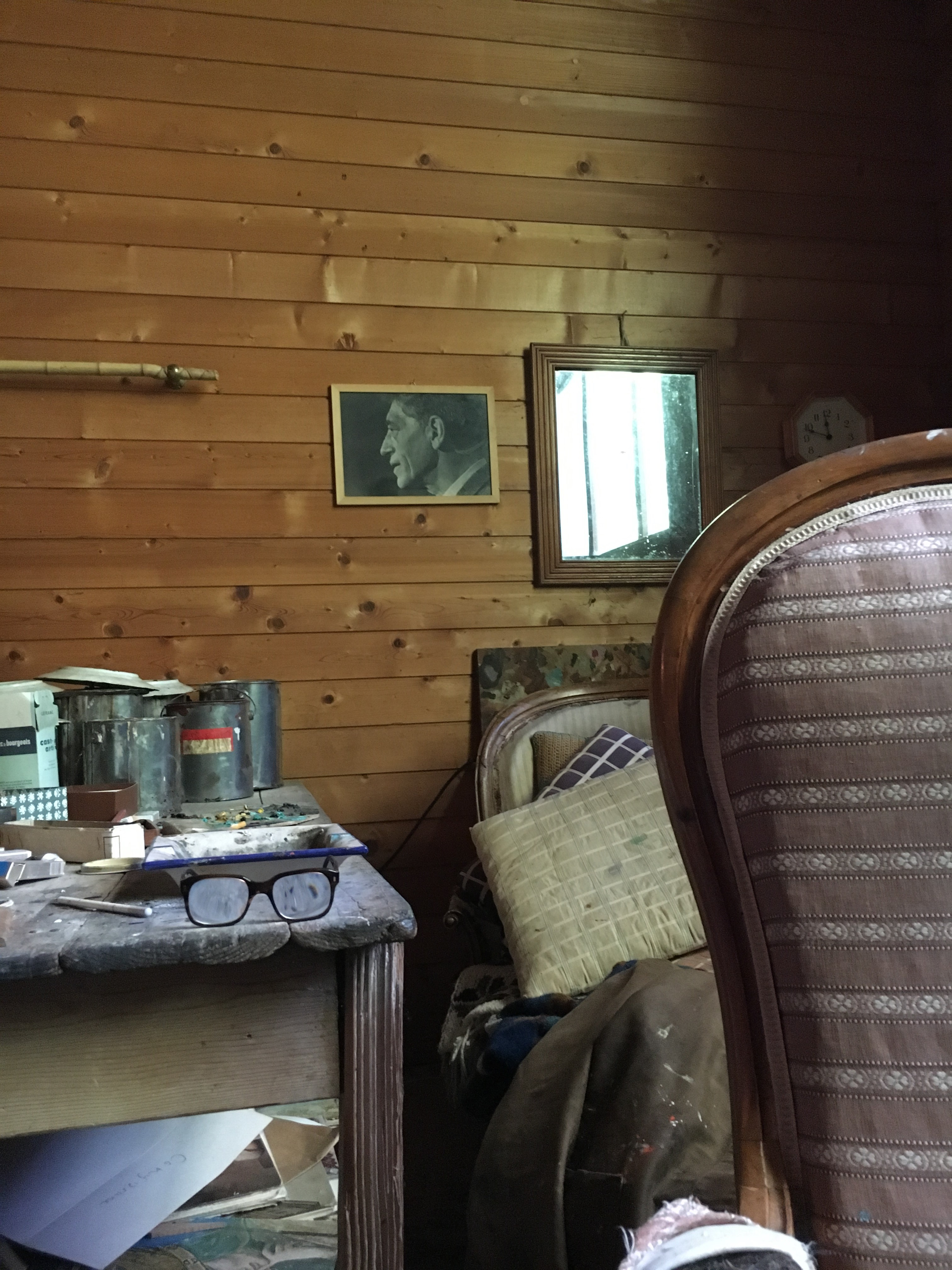
Balthus's glasses in his studio as he left them on the day of his death. In the background, behind the armchair, is the chaise longue with the pillows on which he died on 18 February 2001. Before he died, Balthus continually repeated: "I should continue, I should continue."

With Balthus's funeral on 24 February 2001, the Grand Chalet's grand era also came to an end. Balthus's friends gathered at the Grand Chalet one last time to bid farewell to the great artist. Among them were Prince Sadruddhin Aga Khan, Elle Macpherson and Bono, who is Harumi Klossowska de Rola's godfather. The Irish singer, guitarist and songwriter of the rock band U2 sang at Balthus's funeral.

The appreciation for Balthus was also expressed by the fact that three countries sent official delegations to his funeral: France, Italy and Switzerland. Switzerland was represented by Federal Councillor Ruth Dreifuss.

Furthermore, tributes poured in from the worlds of art and politics for Balthus. The president of the French Republic, Jacques Chirac, called him "an artist of exceptional talent both in drawing and painting." And the French president added in his press release that Balthus was "one of the most important artists of the 20th century. A profound, unique and subtle personality who hated banality above all else." Chirac and his wife Bernadette were close friends with Setsuko and Balthus, who were welcome guests at the Palais de l'Élysée. During his state visit to Switzerland on 28 and 29 October 1998, Chirac also met with Balthus and Setsuko. Balthus and Setsuko were explicitly mentioned in the French president's official address in Bern, which addressed diplomatic, cultural and economic relations between France and Switzerland. Jacques Chirac said: "I would like to acknowledge the presence among us of one of the most remarkable men of our century, Balthus." Following the official state visit, the president of the French Republic stayed privately in Switzerland for a few days.

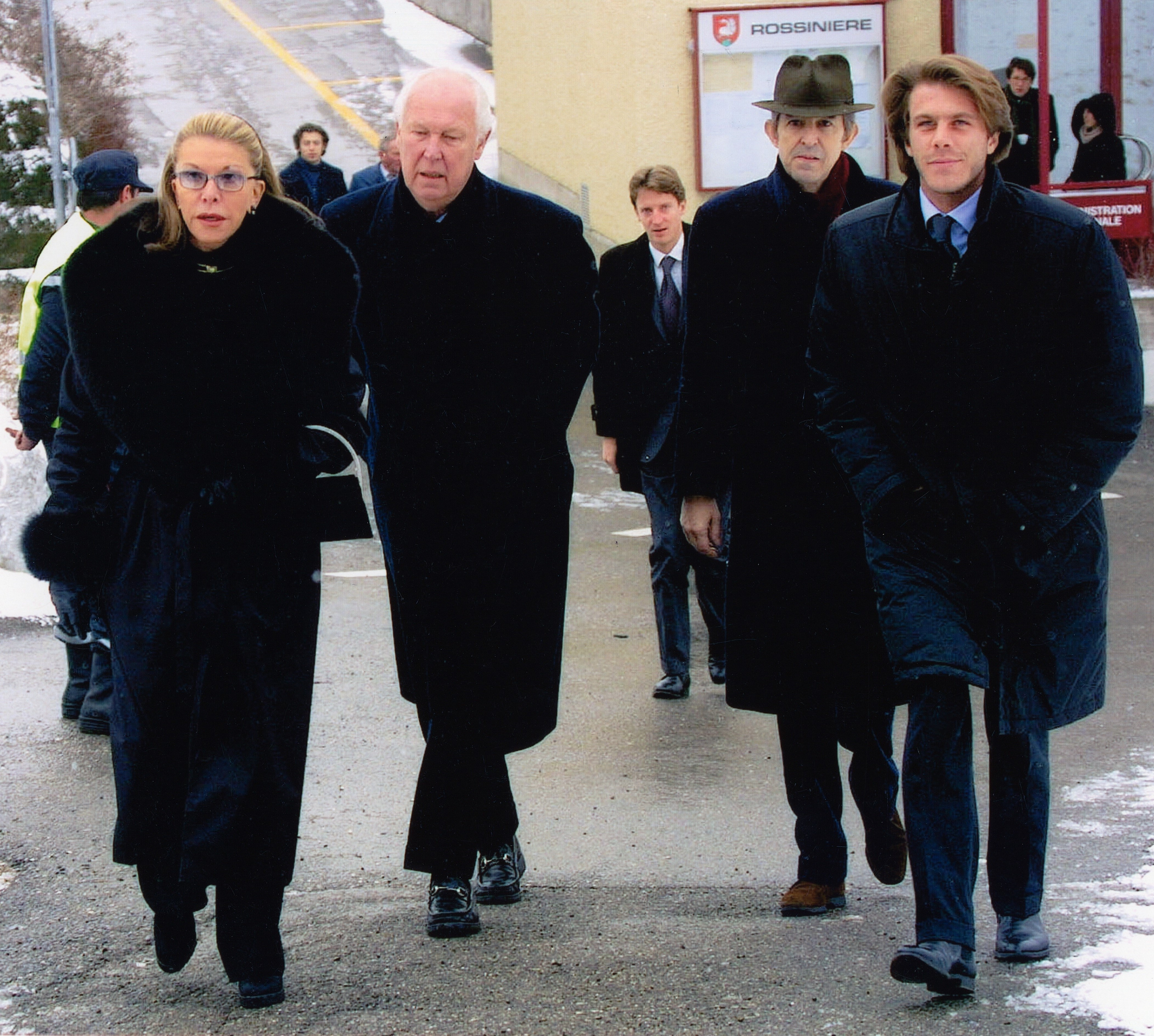
24 February 2001 – Rossinière: The Italian royals en route to Balthus's funeral. From left to right: Marina Doria, Principessa di Savoia; Vittorio Emanuele, Principe di Savoia; and Emanuele Filiberto, Principe di Savoia (far right), whom Balthus portrayed as a child. The former Italian royal family still owns a chalet in Gstaad, as do many members of Balthus's former social circle. Some members of this social circle have known each other since their days at the Institut Le Rosey.

In addition, Vittorio Emanuele, Principe di Savoia, and his wife Marina Doria, Principessa di Savoia, as well as their son, Emanuele Filiberto, Principe di Savoia, came to the funeral in Rossinière and paid their last respects to Balthus. Balthus had painted a portrait drawing of Emanuele Filiberto di Savoia when the prince was still a child. Because Balthus painted slowly, the prince had to wait years for his portrait.

There were paintings that Balthus worked on for up to 10 years before finally painting over them because he wasn't satisfied with them. His gallerist, Pierre Matisse, showed a lot of patience and understanding. Balthus's complete oeuvre comprises approximately 350 paintings. The family only owns five of them. The maintenance of the Grand Chalet is expensive and Balthus's painting style was slow. Therefore, the finished paintings always had to be handed over to the gallerists almost immediately so that the bills could be paid.

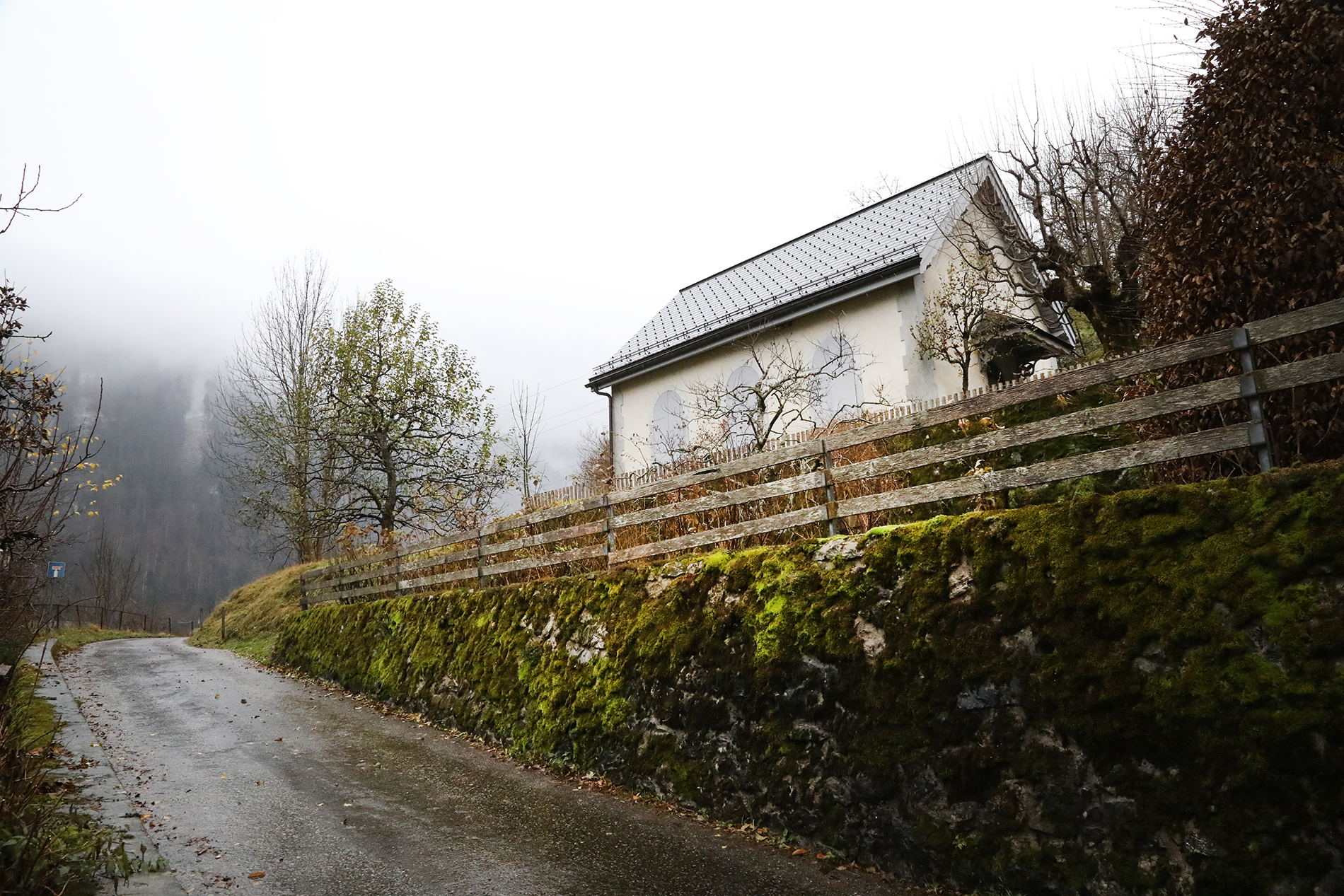
The Balthus Chapel in Rossinière, next to which Balthus's grave is located.

At the Grand Chalet, Balthus entertained artists, collectors, patrons and friends from across the art world. Through Balthus's far-reaching network, the Grand Chalet also became a place where a discreet form of diplomacy unfolded. Swiss Ambassador Nicolas Bideau, during his visit to the Grand Chalet on 12 October 2018, remarked: "The Grand Chalet is a place where the arts flourish. The arts have long played an essential role in diplomacy, while cultural diplomacy transcends borders and opens doors."

The painter's simple grave lies under shady trees next to the Balthus Chapel in Rossinière. "Simplicity and purity", said Balthus, "are the essence from which everything emerges: the beautiful as well as the cruel." Balthus's widow, Setsuko Klossowska de Rola, continues to cultivate Balthus's legacy and is committed to preserving the Grand Chalet as a cultural landmark.

=== Balthus's studio ===
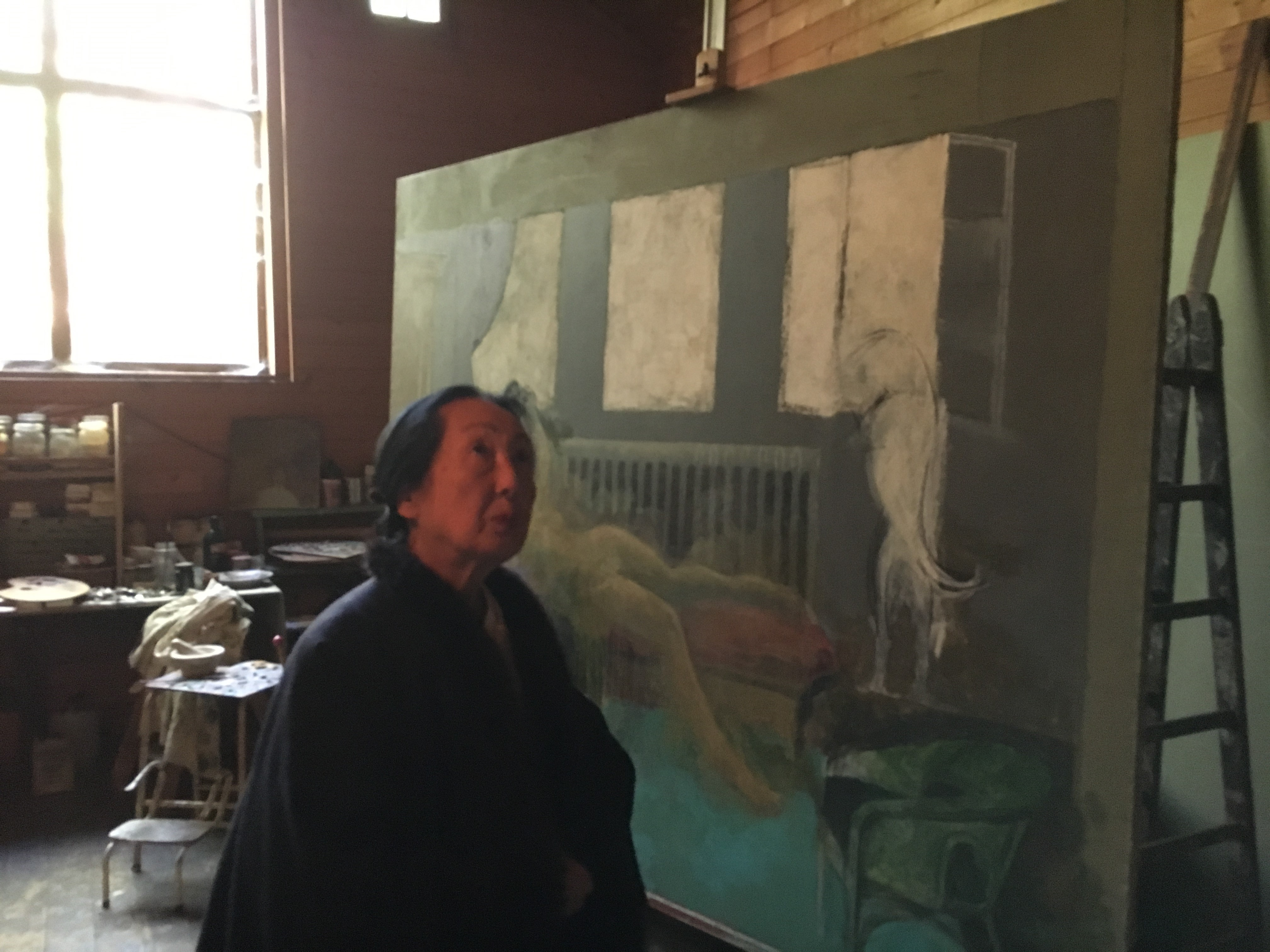
Balthus's widow Setsuko in Balthus's studio in front of one of the unfinished works in 2018.

A particularly impressive room is Balthus's former studio. It is located in the former garage, which dates back to the time when the Grand Chalet was still a hotel.

This room, resembling a monk's cell and also reminiscent of a temple, contains his last, unfinished works. It was here that, in February 2001, Balthus spent his last night on a chaise longue with his wife Setsuko and daughter Harumi.

"We hardly spoke, but there was something very beautiful about those moments."

— Setsuko Klossowska de Rola, Balthus's widow, about her last hours with her husband in his studio in 2001

After Balthus's death, everything in the studio was left exactly as it was at the time of his death. The studio has been preserved as a time capsule to this day.

=== The King of Cats ===
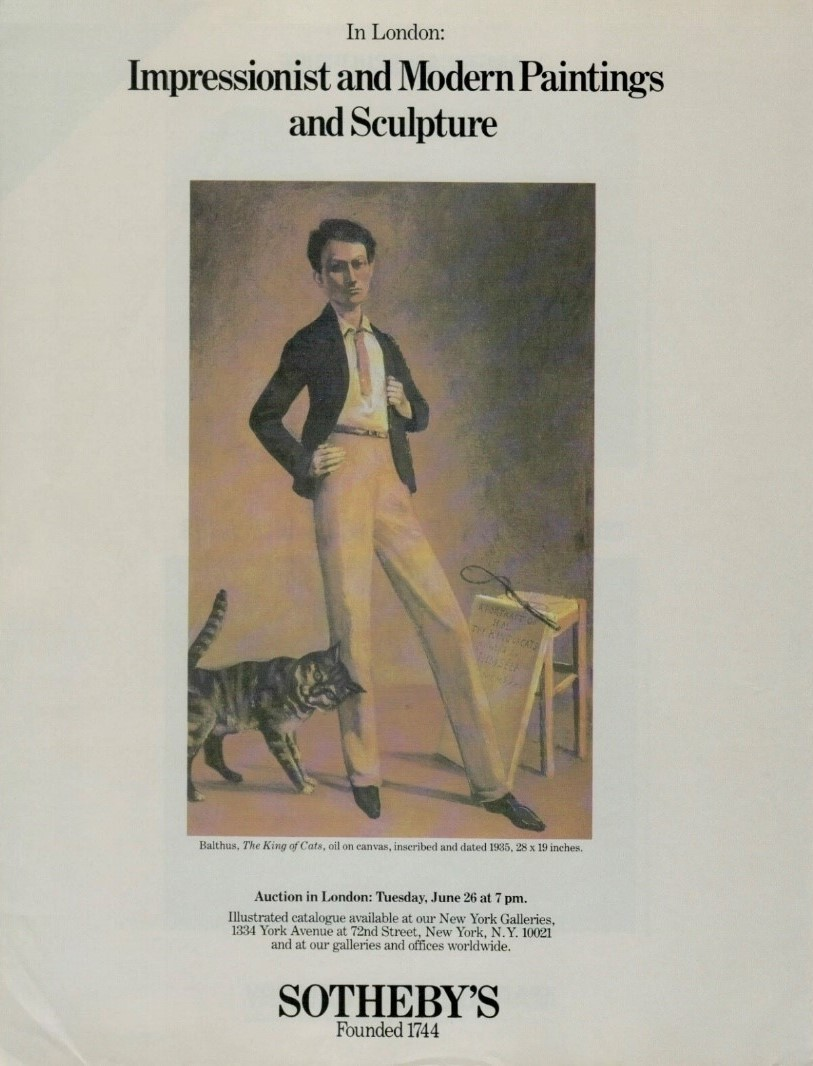
Balthus: The King of Cats (1935), self-portrait.

With Mitsou (1921), the picture story of a cat found and immediately lost again, Balthus, at the age of eleven, began a lifelong relationship with cats, which since the Romanticism have embodied both freedom and the inner world of creative people. According to Balthus's son Thadée Klossowski de Rola (born 1944), Balthus used to say: "I must smell funny. Because whenever there is a cat around it comes and loves me."

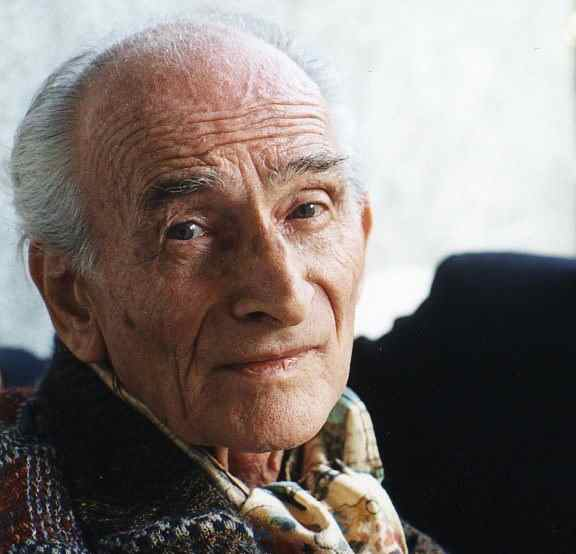
Balthus at the Grand Chalet in 1996, photographed by Damian Pettigrew during the filming of Balthus Through the Looking Glass.

In 1935, the year Balthus painted his portrait The King of Cats, he adopted the title King of Cats, which he used to sign his letters to his future first wife, Rose Alice Antoinette von Wattenwyl (1912–1997). The portrait bears the inscription: "A Portrait of H. M. The King of Cats, painted by Himself, MCMXXXV". The self-portrait thus represents a painter-monarch at the head of an empire populated by cats, exactly the situation that was also found at the Grand Chalet, which was home to Balthus's many cats. Unlike humans, the cats had unrestricted access to every room at the Grand Chalet, which of course also had a practical reason: The cats hunt the mice. In such large, old buildings as the Grand Chalet, there are numerous hiding places where mice can hide. Balthus's obsession with cats would last throughout his lifetime.

"And Balthus was a cat lover. He painted many pictures in which the cat is a kind of self-portrait."

— Sabine Rewald, curator of the exhibition Balthus: Cats and Girls at the Metropolitan Museum of Art in New York (25 September 2013 – 12 January 2014)

== L'Atelier de Balthus ==
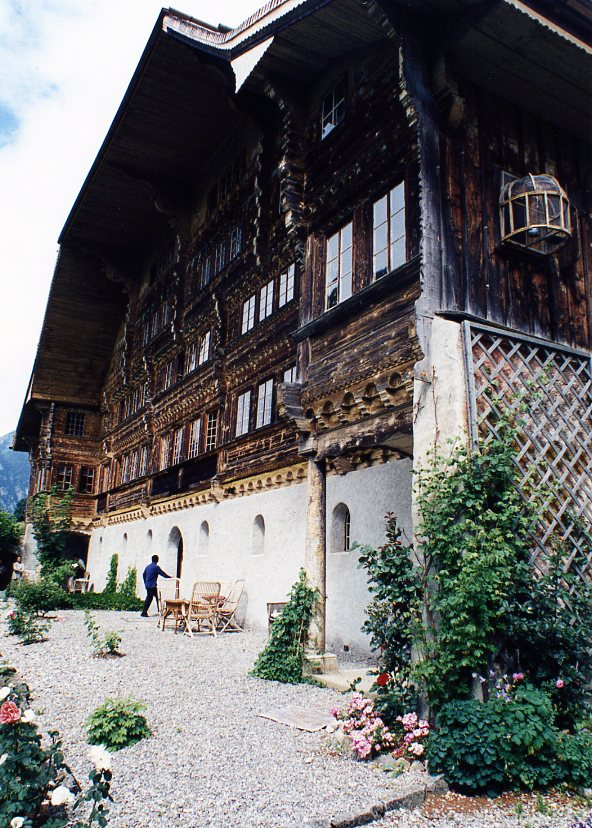
The south façade of the Grand Chalet with the birdcage on the side in 1996.

Following Balthus's passing, the Balthus Foundation was established at the Grand Chalet to preserve his legacy.

In 2018, the heritage of the Balthus Foundation was entrusted to the Cantonal Museum of Fine Arts (MCBA), giving rise to the Atelier de Balthus Association, which seals and strengthens the links between Balthus, the Municipality of Rossinière and the Canton of Vaud.

The association manages the cultural activity between the Balthus Chapel (a living museum on the life of the painter, open year-round), the Balthus Studio, and the Grand Chalet—the family home.

Notable activities of the Balthus Foundation related to the Grand Chalet:

- Bijoux et aquarelles d'Harumi – 22 February 2002
- La Jeunesse de Balthus – 21 September to 16 November 2003
- Henri Cartier-Bresson et Martine Franck – 4 July to 3 October 2004
- Les Dessins de Balthus – 26 June to 30 October 2005
- La Magie du Paysage – 2 July to 17 September 2006
- Le Mystère des Chats – 14 July to 16 September 2007
- Memorial Day – Ceremony for 100 years of Balthus – 29 February 2008

== Documentaries ==
In alphabetical order

- Irene Loebell, Le Grand Chalet de Balthus (53', Digi Beta, ARTE G.E.I.E./SRF, SRG, SSR, 2003). Dokumentation über das vermutlich grösste Holzhaus in den europäischen Alpen
- Damian Pettigrew, Balthus Through the Looking Glass (72', Super 16, PLANETE/CNC/PROCIREP, 1996). Documentary on and with Balthus filmed at work in his studio in Rossinière and in conversation at the Grand Chalet. Shot over a 12-month period in Switzerland, Italy, France and the Moors of England
- Gero von Boehm, Balthus – Geheimnisse eines Malers, ZDF, 1996
