= James Lord (author) =

American writer (1922–2009)

- Born: November 27, 1922; Englewood, New Jersey, U.S.
- Died: August 23, 2009 (aged 86); Paris, France
- Occupations: Writer, essayist
- Partner: Gilles Roy-Lord

James Lord (November 27, 1922 – August 23, 2009) was an American writer. He was the author of several books, including critically acclaimed biographies of Alberto Giacometti and Pablo Picasso. He appeared in the documentary films Balthus Through the Looking Glass (1996) and Picasso: Magic, Sex, Death (2001). Lord is also noted for being the subject of one of Giacometti's last portraits, an experience he documented in his 1965 memoir.

== Life and career ==
Lord was born in Englewood, New Jersey, and grew up there, the son of Louise and Albert Lord. His father was a stockbroker, and until the Wall Street crash the family lived, as Lord put it, in "the lower echelons of the upper classes". He graduated from Englewood School for Boys (now Dwight-Englewood School) in 1940.

Lord attended Wesleyan University, though he never earned a degree. He served in the United States Army during World War II and was part of the Ritchie Boys who specialized in Military Intelligence. Following the liberation of Paris, he remained in the city and gained entry into the artistic circles of Montparnasse. He developed acquaintances with figures such as Jean Cocteau, Dora Maar, Gertrude Stein and Alice B. Toklas.

He wrote about his wartime experiences in his book, My Queer War which discusses keeping his homosexuality carefully hidden.

Lord died of a heart attack in Paris, at the age of 86.

== Association with Alberto Giacometti ==
Approximately eighteen months before Alberto Giacometti's death, Lord agreed to sit for a portrait. While Lord initially anticipated the process would require only one or two sittings, it evolved into eighteen gruelling sessions in the artist's Paris atelier. During this time, Lord observed Giacometti's struggle with his work, witnessing the artist repeatedly destroying and rebuilding the image in an attempt to capture what he saw. Lord secretly transcribed Giacometti's commentary during their sessions and, fearing the painting would never be finished or that he would not acquire it, requested permission to photograph the canvas at the end of each day.

These notes and photographs became the basis for Lord's 1965 book, A Giacometti Portrait. The book chronicles the creation of the artwork and the artist's psychological state. Giacometti's brother, Diego Giacometti, wrote a prologue for the volume, stating that the text captured his brother's spirit.

Following the publication of the memoir, Lord spent fifteen years researching and writing a comprehensive biography of Giacometti. Despite his extensive work on the artist's legacy, Lord was prevented from purchasing the original portrait for which he had sat. Giacometti's widow, Annette, blocked the purchase, angered by the intimacies revealed in Lord's writings which she felt distorted her husband's image.

== In popular culture ==
The 2017 movie Final Portrait retells the story of his friendship with the painter Alberto Giacometti. Lord is played by Armie Hammer.

== Selected bibliography ==
=== Biographies and novels ===
- No Traveler Returns. John Day Company. 1956. ASIN B002DGC9J4.
- The Joys of Success. John Day Company. 1958. ASIN B0007E5806.
- A Giacometti Portrait. Forgotten books. 1965. ISBN 978-1528340182.
- Giacometti: A Biography. Farrar, Straus and Giroux. 1985. ISBN 978-0374525255.
- Picasso and Dora: A Personal Memoir. Weidenfeld & Nicolson. 1993. ISBN 978-0297813835.
- Six Exceptional Women. Farrar, Straus and Giroux. 1994. ISBN 978-0374528362.
- Making Memoirs. Elysium Press. 1995. ISBN 978-0964039940.
- Some Remarkable Men. Farrar, Straus and Giroux. 1996. ISBN 978-0374266554.
- A Gift for Admiration. Further Memoirs. Farrar, Straus and Giroux. 1998. ISBN 978-0374281922.
- Stories of Youth. Elysium Press. 2001.
- My Queer War. Farrar, Straus and Giroux. 2010. ISBN 978-0374532758.

=== Essays ===
- "Regard vers l'invisible". Derrière le miroir. No. 226. Paris: Maeght. December 1977. ISBN 2-85587-038-0.
