= Astier de Villatte =

French home goods company

Astier de Villatte is a home goods company based in Paris founded in 1996. It produces collections of candles, cutlery, ceramics, perfume, glassware, furniture, and stationery.

== History ==
Benoît Astier de Villatte spent his early childhood in Rome, residing there until age five while his father, Pierre Carron, served as an artist-in-residence at the French Academy in Rome at the Villa Medici, along with sculptor Georges Jeanclos. Upon the family's relocation to Paris, Carron became a professor at the École des Beaux-Arts, where his son subsequently pursued his studies under Jeanclos. Pericoli moved from Italy to Paris to live with his father when he was thirteen after the death of his mother. He met Astier de Villatte and his siblings at this time. He studied painting at the École des Beaux-Arts under Jeanclos and Carron. During this period, Pericoli became very close to Carron's whole family. With friends and members of the Carron family, Astier de Villatte and Pericoli formed a loose collective of artists who focused on making furniture and ceramics.

In 1996, Astier de Villatte was founded by Benoît Astier de Villatte, his sister Mathilde Carron-Astier de Villatte, and Ivan Pericoli. The ceramics sold well, leading to an article in Marie Claire, which led to their pieces featured at the Maison et Objet design exhibition. The business quickly grew with investment of money and assistance from Astier de Villatte's family. The company opened its first store in 2000.

According to Pericoli, they "are inspired by the old and forgotten, and are as touched by the beauty of something found in the trash as an artwork in the Louvre."

In October 2024, Astier de Villatte sold a majority stake to the investment fund Vesper. Pericoli and Benoît Astier de Villatte retained a "significant stake" in the company and continued as creative leaders.

== Stores ==
The company operates a flagship store on the Rue Saint-Honoré in Paris, which was formerly the shop of the goldsmith Martin-Guillaume Biennais. It is, according to Benoît, the only shop interior in Paris which survives from Napoleonic France. It has another store in the city on the Rue de Tournon which opened in 2016. The store expanded to Seoul in 2021, and Milan and Tokyo in 2024.

== Products ==
The company's ceramics are made from black terracotta, a material more often used in sculpture, formed with plaster molds and then covered with a white glaze. The pieces have a distinctive look showing their handmade nature with an unevenness and interruptions in the glaze showing the terracotta underneath. The ceramics workshop is located on Boulevard Masséna. It is staffed mostly by employees who originate from Tibet.

In 2008, Astier de Villatte started selling perfume and candles. Their first three scents were by Françoise Caron of Takasago. In 2023, the company revived historic perfumes by partnering with master perfumer Dominique Ropion and perfume historian Annick Le Guérer using old recipes and modern technology. They revived a kyphi, an ancient Egyptian incense, Artaban, a perfume of Parthian kings that was a favorite of ancient Roman nobility, and Les Nuits, the perfume of George Sand.

The company produces notebooks and stationery, with their signature notebook covered in a trompe-l'oeil print of cubes. In 2015, it acquired Société des Ateliers et Imprimeries Graphiques (SAIG), a linotype printing firm located in the suburbs of Paris. In 2016, they published through the firm the book Ma Vie à Paris, a guidebook which covers Ivan and Benoît's favorite shops of Paris.

== Collaborations ==
The company has collaborated with numerous designers, including Dana Wyse, John Derian, Nathalie Lété, Patch NYC, Setsuko Klossowska de Rola, and Grace Coddington, who in 2024 partnered with the company on a collection of cards and ceramics with cat motifs.
