= Setsuko Klossowska de Rola =

Japanese painter (born 1942)

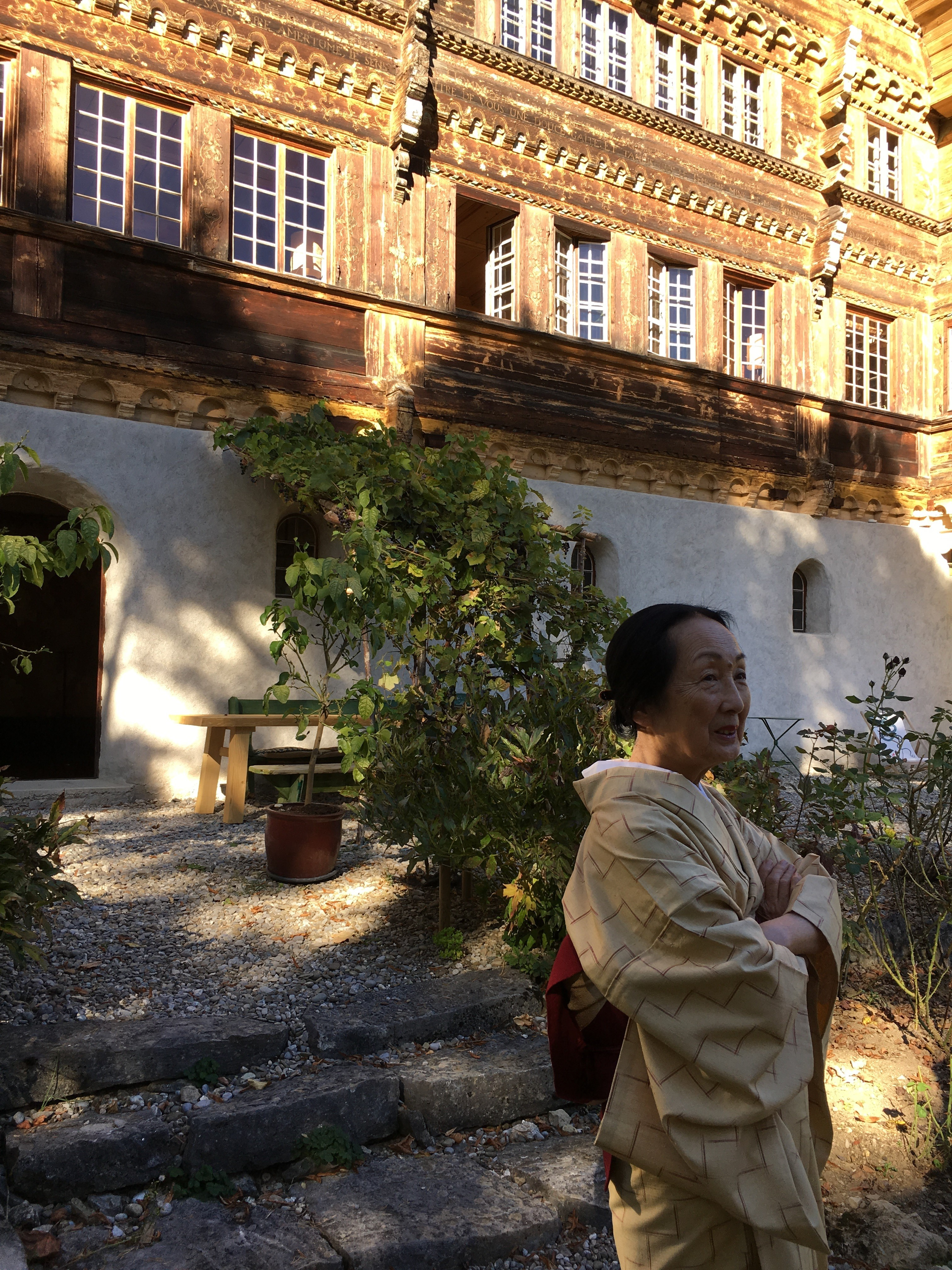
- Comtesse Setsuko Klossowska de Rola in front of the Grand Chalet (garden side)
- Born: Setsuko Ideta; 1942 (age 83–84); Tokyo, Japan
- Education: Sophia University, Tokyo
- Known for: Painting, writing
- Spouse: Balthus (Balthasar Klossowski de Rola)

Setsuko Klossowska de Rola (born January 1, 1942) is a Japanese painter. She has exhibited her work internationally, and is also a writer. She became UNESCO's Artist For Peace in 2005. She is the widow of the French painter, Balthus, and is honorary president of the Balthus Foundation.

== Biography ==
Setsuko was born Setsuko Ideta in Tokyo, in 1942. She graduated from Tokyo Morimura Gakuen High School in 1961 and entered the department of French language at Sophia University in Tokyo. As a university student, she met the painter Balthus who was visiting Japan for the first time in 1962. Setsuko became Balthus's second wife in 1967. Setsuko lived with Balthus at the Villa Medici, where he presided as director of the French Academy in Rome. In 1968, she gave birth to a son, Fumio, who died aged two years and six months. In 1973, a daughter, Harumi, was born. In 1977, Setsuko and Balthus left the French Academy and moved to Le Grand Chalet in Rossinière, Switzerland, where she still lives with her daughter Harumi, her son-in-law, photographer Benoît Peverelli, and her two grandchildren. Balthus died in 2001.

Setsuko's art has been exhibited in, among other places, Rome, New York, Paris, London and Tokyo. In 2002 she was Cultural Patron of the 2002 Venice Congress. She collaborates with French ceramics maker Astier de Villatte. Her Paris studio is within the workshops in Astier de Villatte ceramic factory.
