= Harumi Klossowska de Rola =

Swiss contemporary artist and designer

- Born: 1973 (age 52–53); Geneva
- Known for: Sculpting, jewelry design
- Partner: Benoît Peverelli
- Children: 2
- Website: http://harumiklossowska.com/

Harumi Klossowska de Rola is a French artist based in Rossiniere, Switzerland, contemporary artist and designer.

She was born in 1973, in Geneva, as the daughter of Balthasar Klossowski de Rola, known as Balthus, a Polish-French modern artist, and Setsuko Klossowska de Rola, a Japanese painter.

Harumi spent her early childhood at Villa Medici, the residence of the French Academy in Rome, which was at the time run by her father. In 1977, they moved to Grand Chalet in Rossinière where she still lives with her partner, photographer Benoît Peverelli, their two children, and her mother Setsuko.

== Biography ==
As a child, Harumi made small animal sculptures from the stones she collected in the gardens of Villa Medici. Every Sunday, her mother gave her lessons in calligraphy, which later helped her with drawing. As a teenager, she started making jewelry by adding semi-precious stones to handmade silk Chinese buttons from her mother's collection. In her early twenties, she started as an intern to John Galliano and his team and quickly rose to the role of a PR assistant. Soon after that, she started designing fine jewelry inspired by Italian Pre–Renaissance art. She often cites Antoinette de Watteville, her father's first wife and mother of her two half-brothers, and her sister-in-law Lulu de la Falaise as great influences in her jewelry design.

She designed jewelry for Boucheron and Chopard before expanding her practice into sculpture and unique decorative objects. She draws inspiration from various sources including nature (wild animals, plants, and trees), Greek, Roman, and Egyptian mythology, African art, and Japanese philosophy of wabi-sabi.

== Exhibitions ==
Her notable solo shows include Retour d'Expedition, Van Cleef & Arpels's L'Ecole des Arts Joailliers in 2017, "Yakushima", the Mystic Island at Galerie Yves Gastou, Paris, in 2023, and Hayawan at Robilant+Voena New York gallery in 2023, which was her first solo show in the United States. In February and March 2025, Harumi had a solo exhibition at Acquavella Galleries in Palm Beach.
