= Balthus =

French artist (1908–2001)

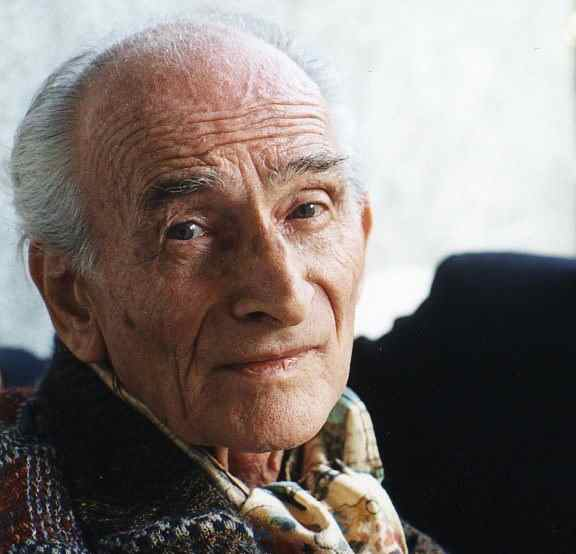
- Balthus by Damian Pettigrew (1996)
- Born: Balthasar Klossowski; February 29, 1908; Paris, France
- Died: February 18, 2001 (aged 92); Rossinière, Switzerland
- Known for: Painting, drawing, watercolor
- Notable work: The Street (1933–1935); The Mountain (1937); Nude Before a Mirror (1955)
- Spouse: Antoinette de Watteville (m. 1937; div. 1966) Setsuko Klossowska de Rola (m. 1967)
- Children: 4, including Harumi Klossowska de Rola
- Relatives: Pierre Klossowski (brother)
- Awards: Praemium Imperiale

Balthasar Klossowski (French: [klɔsɔfski]; February 29, 1908 – February 18, 2001), also known as Balthus (French: [baltys]), was a Polish-French modern artist. He is known for his erotically charged images of young girls and the dreamlike quality of his imagery.

Balthus rejected the usual conventions of the art world. Insisting that his paintings must be seen rather than read, he resisted attempts to build a biographical profile. Late in life, he was interviewed by neurobiologist Semir Zeki, in Rossinière, Switzerland, and at the Palazzo Farnese in Rome. The interviews were published in 1995 under the title La Quête de l'essentiel. In these conversations, he discussed some of his views on art, painting, and his contemporaries.

== Biography ==
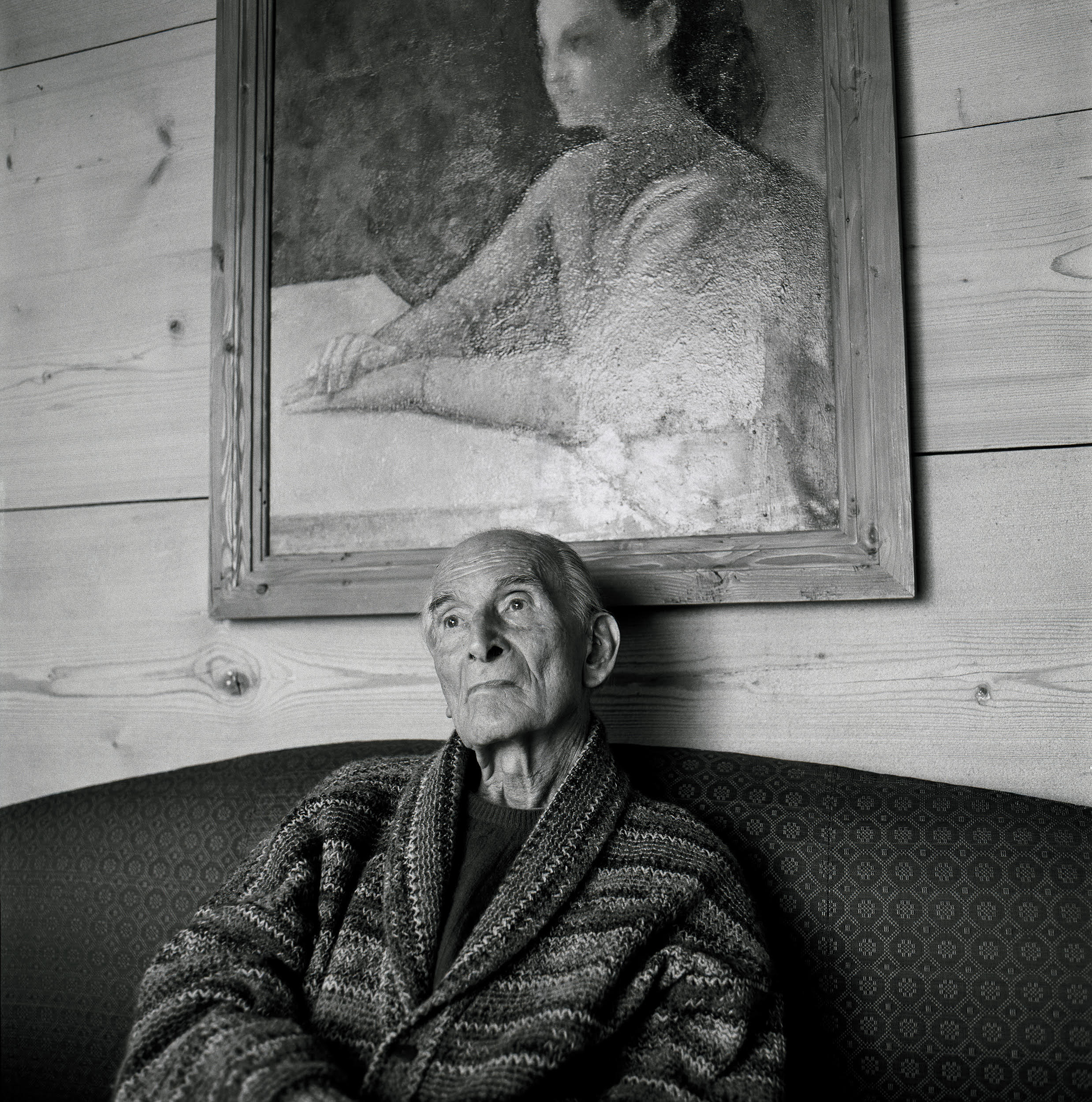
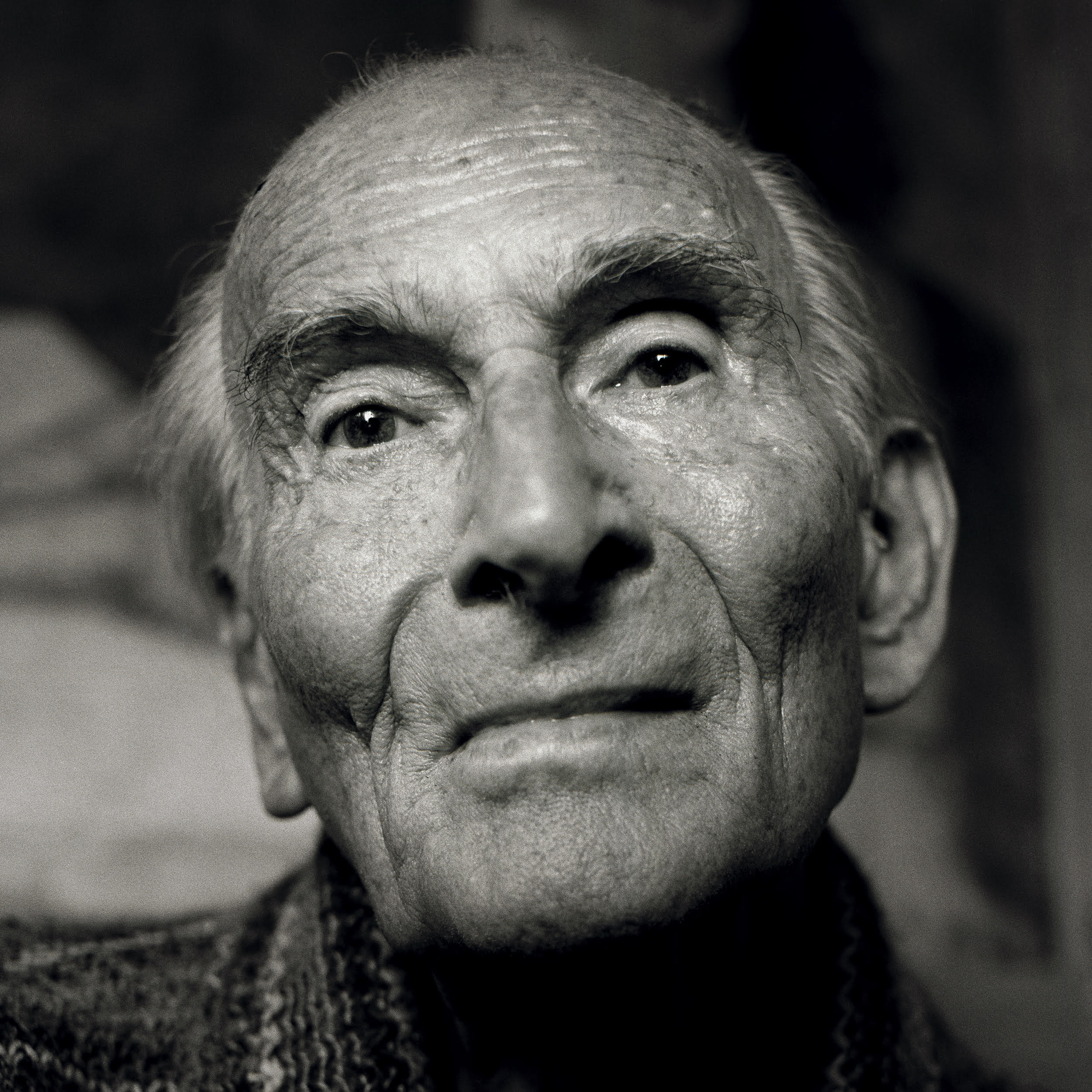
Balthus portraits by Oliver Mark, Rossinière 2000

=== Early years ===
Balthus, originally Balthasar Klossowski, was born in Paris in 1908 to the Prussian expatriates Erich Klossowski, a painter and art historian, and Elisabeth Dorothée Spiro Klossowska (known as Baladine Klossowska). The sobriquet "Balthus" was rooted in the artist's childhood nickname, which can be alternately spelled Baltus, Baltusz, Balthusz or Balthus.

His father Erich grew up in the town of Ragnit (now Neman) in East Prussia, currently part of Kaliningrad Oblast, Russia. Balthus claimed that his father belonged to the former Polish petty nobility (the drobna szlachta) and that his family bore the Rola coat of arms. The artist later elaborated on his family background, opting to use the surname "Klossowski de Rola", and adding the term "count" to this title. Balthus had the Rola arms embroidered onto many of his kimonos, in the style of a Japanese kamon.

Baladine was descended from Lithuanian Jews who had emigrated to East Prussia. In the catalogue of the Metropolitan Museum of Art's 1984 Balthus exhibition, she was described as the daughter of a cantor from Korelitz in Novogrudok district in the Russian Empire. However, Balthus told his biographer Nicholas Fox Weber that this was erroneous, and that his mother came "apparently from a Protestant family in the south of France". According to Weber, however, this was false. In fact, Balthus would often embellish the story of his mother's ancestry, saying that she was also related to the Romanovs and the Narischkins. In another confabulatory twist, Weber reports that Baladine's lover, the poet Rainer Maria Rilke, had said that the Spiros were descended from one of the richest families of Sephardic Jews, that is that they were of Spanish, not Eastern European origin. Weber also doubted this story, noting that Balthus's son Fumio, born in the late 1960s, had Tay–Sachs disease, a genetic disorder commonly associated with Eastern European Jewish populations.

Nude with arms raised, oil on canvas, 1951, by Balthus

Balthus's older brother Pierre Klossowski (1905–2001) became a noted writer and philosopher.

The Klossowski children grew up in an artistic environment, with frequent visits to their household by famous artists and writers, including Rainer Maria Rilke, André Gide (who mentored Pierre), and Jean Cocteau (who would depict the family in scenes of his 1929 novel Les Enfants Terribles). The artists Maurice Denis and Pierre Bonnard were also visitors. The children had a Scottish nanny, and Balthus would later say that his first language was English, although his parents spoke German to one another.

Overall, Balthus had an idyllic memory of his childhood years, which were disrupted when, shortly after the First World War began in 1914, the family was forced to leave Paris in order to avoid deportation due to their German citizenship. They settled first in Switzerland and later in Berlin.

In 1917 his parents separated, and his mother moved with the two boys to Geneva. They lived in a modest flat at 11, rue Pré-Jérôme. About a year later his mother became the lover of Rilke. Rilke was very impressed with the young Balthus’ artistic talent, and helped him to publish his first work in 1921 at the age of 13. This was a wordless novel titled Mitsou, which included forty drawings by Balthus and a preface by Rilke. The comic-book-style pictures depict the story of a young boy who loses his beloved cat. The themes of the story foreshadowed Balthus's lifelong fascination with cats, along with a feeling of loss or disappearance.

Because of financial difficulties, Baladine moved with her children to her brother's house in Berlin in 1921.

=== Young adulthood ===
In 1926, Balthus visited Florence, where he copied many frescos by the Renaissance master Piero della Francesca. This inspired an early work of his: the tempera wall paintings of the Protestant church of the Swiss village of Beatenberg which he created in 1927.

From 1930 to 1931, Balthus served in the French army in Morocco. He was drafted into the Moroccan infantry in Kenitra and Fes, worked as a secretary, and sketched his painting La Caserne (1933).

In 1933, he moved to Paris, taking a studio in the Rue de Furstemberg. Later he would move to another studio at the nearby Cour de Rohan. Balthus showed limited engagement with modernist styles such as Cubism. His paintings were realistic but introverted, in the manner of the second generation of Surrealist painters such as Salvador Dalí, who often used realistic techniques to depict psychological motifs or dream images. Balthus frequently depicted adolescent subjects in compositions that have been described as erotic or voyeuristic by critics. One of the most notorious works from his first exhibition in Paris was The Guitar Lesson (1934), which caused controversy due to its sadistic and sexually explicit imagery. The painting depicts a young girl arched on her back over the lap of her female teacher, whose hands are positioned on the girl as if to play her like a guitar: one hand near her exposed vulva, and the other hand grasping her hair. Viewers were troubled not only by the painting's eroticism, but also by a suspicion of blasphemy in the composition's similarity to that of a famous French religious work, the Pietà of Villeneuve-lès-Avignon. Other works from the same exhibition included The Street (1933), Cathy Dressing (1933) and Alice (1933).

Balthus, Guitar Lesson, 1934, oil on canvas

Early on his work was admired by writers and fellow painters, especially by André Breton and Pablo Picasso. His circle of friends in Paris included the novelists Pierre Jean Jouve, Antoine de Saint-Exupéry, Joseph Breitbach, Pierre Leyris, Henri Michaux, Michel Leiris and René Char, the photographer Man Ray, the playwright and actor Antonin Artaud, and the painters André Derain, Joan Miró and Alberto Giacometti (one of the most faithful of his friends). In 1948, another friend, Albert Camus, asked him to design the sets and costumes for his play L'État de Siège (The State of Siege, directed by Jean-Louis Barrault). Balthus also designed the sets and costumes for Artaud's adaptation for Percy Bysshe Shelley's The Cenci (1935), Ugo Betti's Delitto all'isola delle capre (Crime on Goat-Island, 1953) and Barrault's adaptation of Julius Caesar (1959–1960).

In 1937 he married Antoinette de Watteville, who was from an aristocratic family from Bern. He had met her as early as 1924, and she was the model for the aforementioned Cathy Dressing and for a series of portraits. Balthus had two children from this marriage, Stanislas (born 1942) and Thaddeus Klossowski (born 1944), who recently published books on their father, including the letters by their parents. Stanislas, known as "Stash", became a figure in swinging London and Paris in the 1960s.

=== Champrovent to Chassy ===
In 1940, with the invasion of France by German forces, Balthus fled with his wife Antoinette to Savoy to a farm in Champrovent near Aix-les-Bains, where he began work on two major paintings: Landscape near Champrovent (1942–1945) and The Living Room (1942). In 1942, he escaped from Occupied France to Switzerland, first to Bern and in 1945 to Geneva, where he became a friend of the publisher Albert Skira as well as the writer and member of the French Resistance, André Malraux. Balthus returned to France in 1946 and a year later traveled with André Masson to Southern France, meeting figures such as Picasso and Jacques Lacan, who eventually became a collector of his work. With Adolphe Mouron Cassandre in 1950, Balthus designed stage decor for a production of Mozart's opera Così fan tutte in Aix-en-Provence. Three years later he moved into the Chateau de Chassy in the Morvan, living with his step-niece Frédérique Tison and finishing his large-scale paintings La Chambre (The Room 1952, possibly influenced by Pierre Klossowski's novels) and Le Passage du Commerce Saint-André (1954).

=== Later years ===
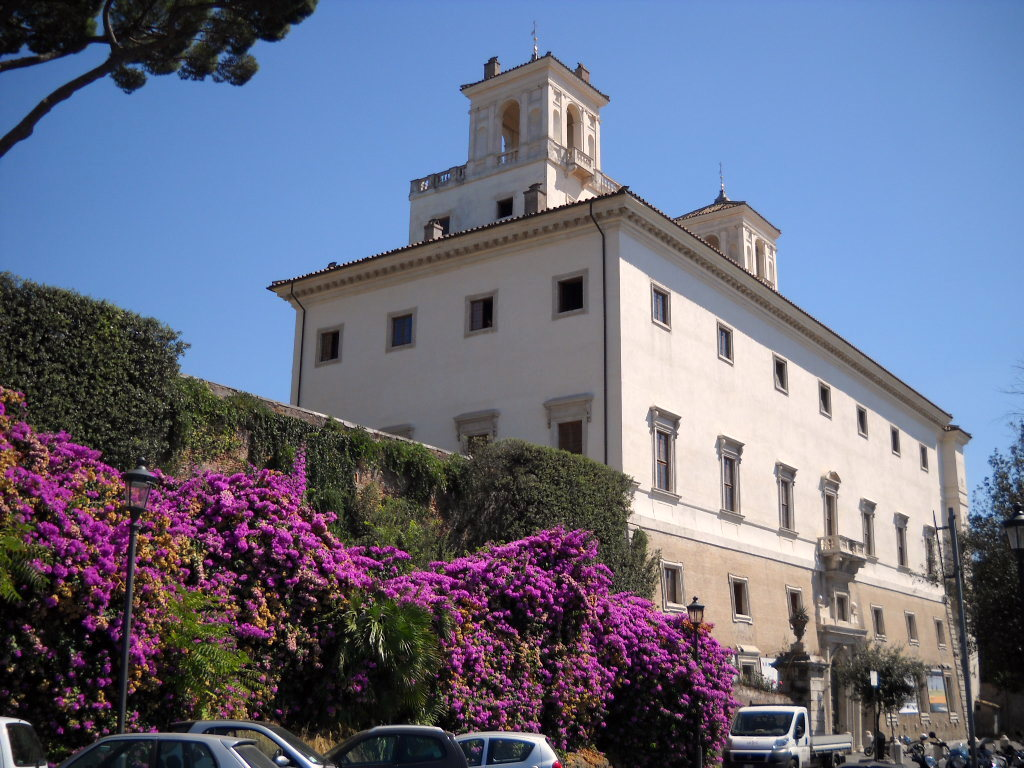
In the 1960s and 70s he lived at, and restored, the Villa de Medici while director of the French Academy in Rome

International fame grew with exhibitions in the gallery of Pierre Matisse (1938) and the Museum of Modern Art (1956) in New York City. In 1961, he moved to Rome where he presided over the Villa de Medici as director (appointed by the French Minister of Culture André Malraux) of the French Academy in Rome. He became a friend of the filmmaker Federico Fellini and the painter Renato Guttuso.

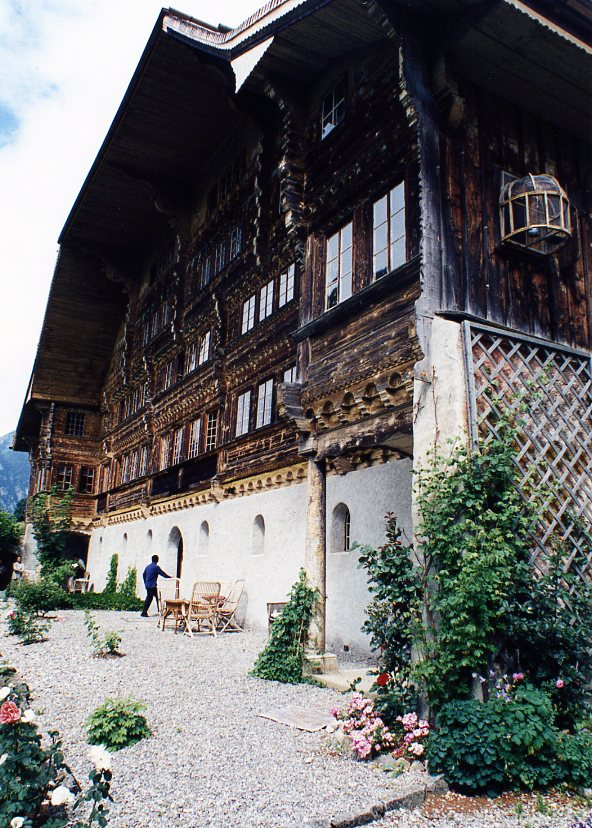
Balthus's Grand Chalet in Rossinière

In 1977, he moved to Rossinière, Switzerland. He married Setsuko Ideta in 1967, after meeting her in Japan during a diplomatic mission initiated by Malraux. The pair had a son, Fumio, who was born in 1968 but died two years later.

The photographers and friends Henri Cartier-Bresson and Martine Franck (Cartier-Bresson's wife) both portrayed the painter and his wife and their daughter Harumi (born 1973) in his Grand Chalet in Rossinière in 1999.

Balthus was one of the few living artists to be represented in the Louvre, when his painting The Children (1937) was acquired from the private collection of Pablo Picasso.

He co-authored a book of dialogues with the neurobiologist Semir Zeki, entitled La Quête de l'essentiel.

He died in Rossinière, Switzerland, in February 18, 2001. Bono, lead singer of U2, sang for the hundreds of mourners at the funeral, including the President of France, the Prince Sadruddhin Aga Khan, supermodel Elle Macpherson, and Cartier-Bresson.

=== Style and themes ===
Balthus's style is primarily classical. His work shows numerous influences, including the writings of Emily Brontë, the writings and photography of Lewis Carroll, and the paintings of Masaccio, Piero della Francesca, Simone Martini, Poussin, Jean-Étienne Liotard, Joseph Reinhart, Géricault, Ingres, Goya, Jean-Baptiste-Camille Corot, Courbet, Edgar Degas, Félix Vallotton and Paul Cézanne. Although his technique and compositions were inspired by pre-Renaissance painters, there also are eerie intimations of contemporary surrealists like de Chirico. Painting the figure at a time when figurative art was largely ignored, Balthus created a body of work that, according to Philippe de Montebello, "commands its own chapter in the history of twentieth-century art."

Many of his paintings show young girls in an erotic context. However, Balthus insisted that his work was not erotic, but that it recognized the discomforting facts of children's sexuality. In 2013, Balthus's paintings of adolescent girls were described by Roberta Smith in The New York Times as both "alluring and disturbing". In its transgressive themes and treatment of sexual taboo, his art has been compared to the work of the contemporary philosopher Georges Bataille (a friend of his brother Pierre Klossowski).

== Influence and legacy ==
His work has influenced several contemporary artists, notably Duane Michals and Émile Chambon. He has also influenced the filmmaker Jacques Rivette of the French New Wave, whose film Hurlevent (1985) was inspired by Balthus's drawings made at the beginning of the 1930s: "Seeing as he's a bit of an eccentric and all that, I am very fond of Balthus (...) I was struck by the fact that Balthus enormously simplified the costumes and stripped away the imagery trappings (...)".

His widow, Setsuko Klossowska de Rola, heads the Fonds Balthus, the archives of the painter, which is accessible to scholars as a long term deposit in the Museum of Fine Arts in Lausanne.

A reproduction of Balthus's Girl at a Window (a painting from 1957) prominently appears in François Truffaut's film Domicile Conjugal (Bed and Board, 1970). The two principal characters, Antoine Doinel (Jean-Pierre Léaud) and his wife Christine (Claude Jade), are arguing. Christine takes down from the wall a small drawing of about 25×25 cm and gives it to her husband: Christine: "Here, take the small Balthus." Antoine: "Ah, the small Balthus. I offered it to you, it's yours, keep it."

During December 2017, a public petition was circulated requesting that Balthus's painting Thérèse Dreaming be removed from display at the Metropolitan Museum of Art in New York due to its alleged explicit content and suggestive portrayal. Philip Kennicott, writing for The Washington Post on 5 December 2017, in an article titled "This painting might be sexually disturbing. But that's no reason to take it out of a museum", summarized the museum's long-standing position against censorship. The painting had previously been on display at the Museum Ludwig in Cologne, Germany, in 2007 without incident.

== In popular culture ==
- South African novelist Christopher Hope wrote My Chocolate Redeemer around a painting by Balthus, The Golden Days (1944), which appears on the book jacket.
- Stephen Dobyns's book The Balthus Poems (Atheneum, 1982) describes individual paintings by Balthus in 32 narrative poems.
- Harold Budd's 1988 album The White Arcades includes a track titled "Balthus Bemused by Color".
- Robert Dassanowsky's book Telegrams from the Metropole: Selected Poems 1980–1998 includes "The Balthus Poem".
- Thomas Harris's book Hannibal (1999, Delacorte Press) says that the character Hannibal Lecter, a psychiatrist, cannibal, and genius, is Balthus's cousin.
- William Minor's book The Balthus Poems (Coracle, 2018) is a minimalist, absurdist approach to his life and work.
- Joyce Carol Oates's 2018 book Beautiful Days: Stories contains the story "Les beaux jours," which contains lyrical descriptions of Balthus's paintings and imagines the life of an eleven-year-old model of Balthus.
- Maya Hawke's 2022 single "Thérèse" from her second studio album Moss was inspired by "Thérèse Dreaming", with Hawke identifying herself with the girl in the painting.
- The UK print edition of Philip Pullman's short work The Collectors features Portrait de la jeune fille en costume d'amazone (1932) as a cover image and inside print. The UK adult cover of Northern Lights features another work by Balthus, Girl in Green and Red (1944).
- Momus (musician) wrote a song titled The Guitar Lesson inspired by Balthus's painting of the same name.

== Exhibitions ==
Balthus held his first exhibition at Galerie Pierre, Paris, in 1934. Following the ensuing scandal, he exhibited at the Pierre Matisse Gallery, New York, from 1938 to 1977, although he never visited the United States. Balthus's first major museum exhibition was at the Museum of Modern Art in 1956. Other museum exhibitions of note include Musée des Arts Decoratifs, Paris (1966); Tate Gallery, London (1968); La Biennale di Venezia (1980); Museum of Contemporary Art, Chicago (1980); Musée cantonal des beaux-arts de Lausanne (1993); Musée d'Art Moderne de la Ville de Paris (1984, traveled to Metropolitan Museum, Kyoto); Metropolitan Museum of Art, New York (1984); and Palazzo Grassi, Venice (2001). "Balthus: Cats and Girls: Paintings and Provocations" at the Metropolitan Museum of Art (September 25, 2013 – January 12, 2014) was the first U.S. museum survey of the artist's work in 30 years. A major retrospective overseen by the artist's wife, Ideta Setsuko, was held in 2014 at the Tokyo Metropolitan Art Museum. An exhibition of Polaroid photographs taken by Balthus at the Museum Folkwang in Essen, Germany, was canceled over accusations of pedophilia. The German newspaper Die Zeit called the images, which depict a model named Anna from ages eight to 16, "documents of pedophile greed." Since then, despite attempts, no planned exhibition of Balthus’s work was censored or cancelled for such allegations.

A retrospective exhibition took place in 2018–2019 at the Beyeler Foundation in Basel and the Museum Thyssen-Bornemisza in Madrid.

== Films on Balthus ==
- Damian Pettigrew, Balthus Through the Looking Glass (72', Super 16, PLANETE/CNC/PROCIREP, 1996). Documentary on and with Balthus filmed at work in his studio and in conversation at his Rossinière chalet. Shot over a 12-month period in Switzerland, Italy, France and the Moors of England.
- Balthus the Painter (Mark Kidel): A film exploring the eroticism, violence, and landscape themes in his paintings
- Inspired/Featured Film Cycle (Thyssen-Bornemisza Museum):
  - In the City of Sylvia (En la ciudad de Sylvia, 2007): Brings to life the atmosphere of a Balthus painting
  - Wuthering Heights (1985): Visually inspired by Balthus’s illustrations for the novel.
  - A Ay (1988): A documentary included in film cycles about the artist.

== Bibliography ==
- Aubert, Raphaël (2005). Le Paradoxe Balthus. Paris: Éditions de la Différence
- Balthus (2001). Correspondance amoureuse avec Antoinette de Watteville: 1928–1937. Paris: Buchet/Chastel
- Clair, Jean and Virginie Monnier (2000). Balthus: Catalogue Raisonné of the Complete Works. New York: Harry N. Abrams, Inc.
- Davenport, Guy (1989). A Balthus Notebook. New York: Ecco Press
- Neret, Gilles (2003). Balthus. New York: Taschen
- Klossowski de Rola, Stanislas (1996). Balthus. New York: Harry N. Abrams, Inc.
- Rewald, Sabine (1984). Balthus. New York: Harry N. Abrams, Inc. ISBN 0-8109-0738-0 / ISBN 0-87099-366-6 (pbk.)
- Roy, Claude (1996). Balthus. Paris: Gallimard
- Vircondelet, Alain (2001). Mémoires de Balthus. Monaco: Editions du Rocher
- Von Boehm, Gero (author) and Kishin Shinoyama (photographer) (2007). The Painter's House. Munich: Schirmer/Mosel
- Weber, Nicholas Fox (1999). Balthus, a Biography. New York: Alfred A. Knopf. ISBN 0-679-40737-5
