= William Minor =

William Minor is the name of:

- William Chester Minor (1834–1920), American surgeon, prolific contributor to the Oxford English Dictionary
- William J. Minor (1808–1869), American planter and banker in the Antebellum South
- William T. Minor (1815–1889), American politician
- William Minor (New York City), New York assemblyman
- William Minor (poet) (born 1969), American minimalist poet
- Bill Minor (1922–2017), American journalist and columnist

== See also ==
- William H. Miner (c. 1862–1930), American entrepreneur, industrialist, pioneer and philanthropist
- William Mynors, English sea-captain who named Christmas Island
