= Alexander Mohr =

German painter and artist (1892–1974)

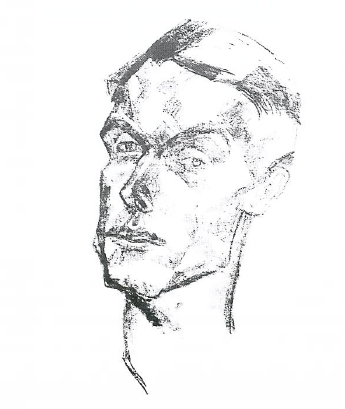
Alexander Mohr: self-portrait, lithograph (around 1920) (City Museum Simeonstift Trier)

Alexander Mohr (1892–1974) was a German Expressionist artist.

== Life and work ==
Mohr was born in Frankenberg, Germany, to affluent parents who hailed from an aristocratic background. Mohr commenced his formal artistic training in 1905 in Koblenz, Germany under the tutelage of German expressionist William Straube (1871–1954), who was a student of Henri Matisse. His formal training was interrupted by World War I where he served as a Cavalry Officer from 1914 to 1918 in the war's eastern front.

With the war behind him, in 1919 Mohr studied under expressionist Adolf Holzel (1853–1934) in Stuttgart and executed his works in the circle of the Rhenish Expressionists in Düsseldorf.

In 1919, he illustrated a book for famed German expressionist writer Carl Maria Weber and later rendered avant-garde illustrations for other publications. Commencing in 1920 Mohr began a lifelong friendship with the French-German writer Joseph Breitbach (1903–1980).

In 1922, Mohr participated in the First International Art Exhibition in Düsseldorf. Later that year Mohr transitioned to Berlin where he became a member of the expressionist November Group and developed an acquaintance with art-handlers Alfred Flechtheim and Wilhelm Uhde.

From 1925 to 1931, Mohr both studied and worked in Paris with three one-man exhibitions in 1927, 1929 and 1930. Through his acquaintance with expressionist Max Jacob, Mohr gained access to Pablo Picasso, with further references from his author friend Joseph Breitbach. While in Paris, Mohr was comfortable and frequently seen with the bon vivant literary elite of Paris, including Jean Schlumberger, André Gide and Julien Green.

Many believe that Mohr's finest expressionist paintings were executed during his Paris years and represented bucolic, mythological scenes influenced by the writings of Virgil, Horace and Ovid as the three canonical poets of Latin literature.

On occasion during 1925 to 1930 Mohr journeyed to Hungary, Spain, Italy and Switzerland to advance his expressionist agenda. In Rhenish Expressionism1932, Mohr visited Greece where he met and married Elsa Kahn, who would remain his lifelong partner. (Elsa's uncle was investment banker Otto Kahn (1867–1934) who built a 127-room mansion on Long Island, the second largest private residence in the United States, after George Vanderbilt's Biltmore Estate in Asheville, North Carolina.)

For the next decade, Mohr worked mostly in Germany, favoring his family homes in Trier and also Merzig, but also with frequent stays in Paris and Greece, inclusive of exhibitions in both Germany and Greece. His last one-man exhibition in Paris was in 1939 as the rumblings of World War II became louder. Mohr recognized the signs of conflict and opted to reside in Greece from 1942 to 1949.

From the mid-1930s, Mohr's artistic style migrated from expressionism to a more abstract form of the German expressionist movement, albeit some characterize this period as a transition to cubism by Mohr. While both expressionism and cubism are forms of modern art, cubism is based much less on the expression of emotion than it is on an intellectual experiment with structure and few would argue that emotion is lacking in Mohr's works. His paintings exude expressive emotion and are executed with quintessential German exactitude. Mohr was a wizard in catching an expression as elusive as thought. A master of expressionist painting, Mohr latched on to the brash and angular. We can only imagine Mohr propped on his studio stool, well-groomed yet smug as he lays evanescent highlights onto the implastic background of the canvas of his early expressionistic work and on another occasion wondering if we will identify the blended nuances, all but hidden, in his later abstract expressionist works.

From 1950 to 1953, Mohr once again migrated to Paris and worked from a studio provided by the Schlumberger family and remained in close contact with his friend Joseph Breitbach.

Beginning in the mid-1950s, Mohr resumed his peripatetic travel rhythm and his lifelong expressionist painting passion became a more casual endeavor. On February 8, 1974, Mohr died after a short illness in Athens, Greece and was interred there.

Several retrospective exhibitions of Mohr's works were held in the following decades. His life is described in Alexander Mohr–Der Maler mit den Flügelschuhen a 410-page illustrated monograph written by Christl Lehnert-Leven and published in 1996 in Germany.

== Exhibitions ==
- 1919 Cologne, Cologne Art Association, Society of the Kunste, November
- 1922 Düsseldorf, Leonhard Tietz AG, First International Art Exhibition, 28 May to 3 July
- 1922 Berlin, Gallerie Alfred Flechtheim, One-man exhibition, October
- 1924 Trier, Artist's home, Christmas exhibition, December
- 1927 Paris, Galerie Zborowski, One-man exhibition, 7 to 22 January
- 1927 Trier, Paulusplatz, College exhibition, April
- 1928 Essen, Folkwang Museum Exhibition, January
- 1928 Düsseldorf, Kunstpalast, German art exhibition, May to October
- 1929 Paris, Galerie aux Quatre Chemins, One-man exhibition, 16 to 30 November
- 1930 Paris, Galerie Klienmann & Cie., One-man exhibition, 31 October to 14 November
- 1930 Trier, Kornmarkt, Annual exhibition, 30 November to 14 December
- 1931 Trier, Bezirk, Annual exhibition, 6 to 20 December
- 1931-1932 Athens, Galerie Parnassos, One-man exhibition, 20 December to 4 January
- 1932 Luxembourg, Galerie Menn, One-man exhibition, 16 April to 4 May
- 1932 Trier, Bischof-Korum house, Rhenish exhibition, 18 to 20 June
- 1932 Trier, Kornmarkt, Annual exhibition, December
- 1932-1933 Athens, Galerie Studio, One-man exhibition, 18 December to 18 January
- 1933 Cologne, Cologne Art Association, One-man exhibition, 1 to 26 December
- 1934 Stuttgart, Wurttembergischer Art Association, One-man exhibition, 6 January to 4 February
- 1934 Athens, Galerie D’Art Geo, One-man exhibition, 19 November to 15 December
- 1935 Cologne, Cologne Art Association, One-man exhibition, September
- 1935 Saarbrücken, National Museum, One-man exhibition, 20 October to 20 November
- 1936 Trier, Paulusplatz, Exhibition, August to September
- 1938 Athens, Galerie Stratigopoulos, One-man exhibition, 2 to 19 February
- 1939 Paris, Galerie Poyet, One-man exhibition, 17 March to 5 April
- 1939 Trier, Konstantinplatz, Christmas exhibition, 15 November to 16 December
- 1941 Berlin, Kunstdienst Exhibition, 28 September to 26 October
- 1941 Trier, Konstantinplatz, Christmas exhibition, December
- 1942 Posen, Kaiser Friedrich Museum, Exhibition, 21 March to 19 April
- 1942 Breslau, Station der Vorgen, Exhibition, 21 June to 19 July
- 1942 Trier, Palastmuseum, Exhibition, July
- 1942 Luxembourg, Kunsthaus, Exhibition, December
- 1943 Luxembourg, Kunsthaus Exhibition, 17 October to 19 December
- 1944 Trier, Palastmuseum Exhibition, July
- 1944 Luxembourg, Fruhjahrsausstellung, Exhibition, March
- 1946 Trier, Paulusplatz, Exhibition, 22 September to 12 October
- 1947 Trier, Paulusplatz, Christmas exhibition, December
- 1950 Mettlach, Abteigebaude, One-man exhibition, 7 to 21 May
- 1954 Saarlouis, French Consulate, One-man exhibition, July and August
- 1958 Athens, Goethe Institute, One-man exhibition, 27 March to 9 April
- 1958 Saarbrücken, Galerie van Hees, One-man exhibition, 23 October to 7 November
- 1961 Wurgendorf, Heimhoftheater, One-man exhibition, 11 to 23 November
- 1961 Koblenz, Kurfurstliches Schloss, One-man exhibition, 10 to 23 December
- 1962 Marseille, Goethe Institute, One-man exhibition, 5 to 17 February
- 1962 Bonn, Bucherstube, One-man exhibition, 9 to 29 March
- 1962 Krefeld, Galerie Carl Uhrig, One-man exhibition, April
- 1962 Nauheim, Kurhaus, Exhibition, May
- 1962 Giessen, Universitatsbibliothek, One-man exhibition, 23 June to 11 July
- 1962 Wetzlar, Exhibition Hall, One-man exhibition, July and August
- 1962 Bad Ems, Kursaalgebaude, One-man exhibition, 1 to 14 September
- 1962 Koblenz, Kurfurstliches Schloss, Exhibition, 22 September to 22 October
- 1962 Frankfurt, Dornbuschaus, One-man exhibition, 3 to 22 November
- 1964 Düsseldorf, Verein-Malkasten, One-man exhibition, 17 March to 8 April
- 1966 Ploermel, Galerie les Marmousets, One-man exhibition, 3 to 31 December
- 1976 Trier, Stadtisches Museum Simeonstift, Exhibition, 12 March to 19 April
- 1977 Merzig, Hilbringen, Exhibition, 18 to 22 February
- 1993 Bonn, August Macke House, Rhenish expressionism exhibition, 28 February to 2 May
- 1996 Trier, Stadtisches Museum Simeonstift, Exhibition, 29 April to 1 September
- 1996-1997 Trier, Stadtisches Museum Simeonstift, Retrospective, 16 December to 31 March
- 1997 Koblenz, Mittelrhein-Museum, Retrospective, 30 April to 1 June
- 1999-2000 Newport Beach, The Pacific Art Foundation, Retrospective, 15 November to 15 May
