= Champrovent =

Village in Savoie, France

Coordinates: 45°40′43″N 5°48′52″E

Champrovent (French pronunciation: [ʃɑ̃pʁɔvɑ̃]) is a small village located in Savoie, France on the western foot of a mountain called Mont du Chat. It is located on the territory of the commune of Saint-Jean-de-Chevelu.

From Chambéry, the main city of Savoie, to join Champrovent, you should drive on the road to Lyon by the Chat tunnel. After crossing the tunnel, you should turn left in a village called Chevelu where a sign indicated Vernatel and Champrovent. This last village is located a few hundred meters away.

Champrovent is famous due to the stay there of the French painter Balthus during World War II. The main building in the village is a farm built in the 17th century. When the northern part of France was invaded by Germany, in June 1941, he decided to live there, where he painted Paysage de Champrovent and two versions of Le Salon. Balthus left Champrovent to Switzerland in late 1941, or early 1942; one version of Le Salon was sold by Sotheby's in 2019 for $3.5 million.

The first version is located in the Minneapolis Institute of Arts and the second is in the collections of MOMA in New York.
