= Biltmore Mound =

North Carolina archaeological site

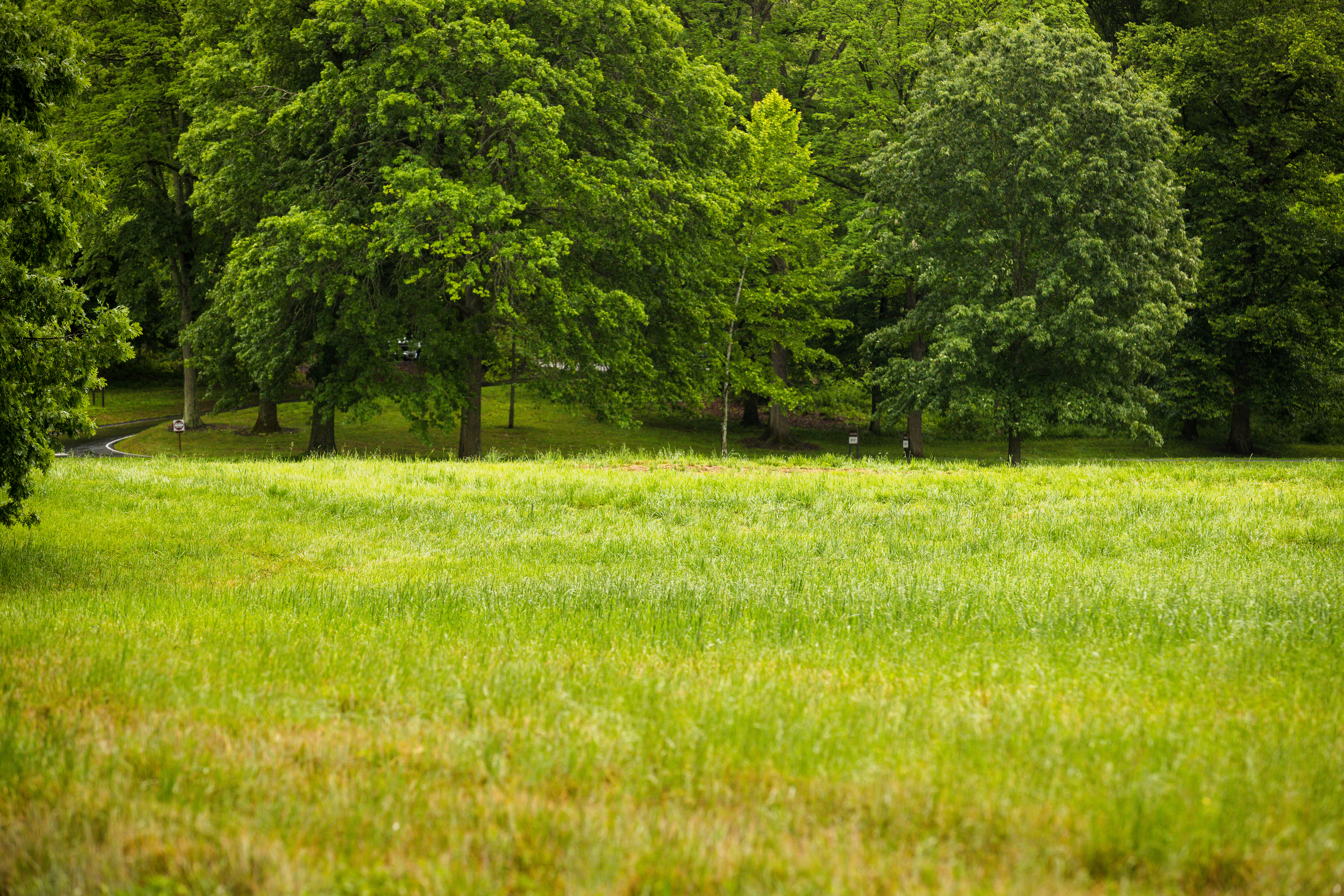
- Landscape view of the Biltmore Mound
- Type: Platform mound
- Cultures: Connestee people, Hopewell tradition
- Location: Biltmore Estate, North Carolina

History
- Built: 400-600

Site notes
- Material: Earth
- Height: 2 meters (6 ft 7 in) (originally)
- Diameter: 30 meters (98 ft)
- Discovered: 1984

The Biltmore Mound is a historical and archaeological site on the Biltmore Estate in Asheville, North Carolina.

== Description ==
The Biltmore Mound is a platform mound which was originally 2 meters tall and 30 meters in diameter. There are 62 postholes on the mound, where ritual posts were once placed. These posts were removed, and the holes were filled with sediment before the mound was abandoned. It originally served as a substructure for wooden buildings used as civic or religious sites by nearby settlements. These buildings may have included an earthen Great House, approximately 25 meters in diameter. The site is very well preserved which makes it extremely valuable to archaeologists. It was encircled by a large village which has also been excavated.

== History ==
The site was used during the Middle Woodland Period and is associated with the Connestee people, ancestors of the Cherokee. It is a place of importance in Cherokee historical memory. Native American presence in the area dates to as early as 8,000 BC.

The mound was built over an older settlement dating to about AD 300. The beginning of the mound's construction is dated to between AD 400 and 550. It is one of the earliest mounds in the Appalachian Summit along with the similarly aged Garden Creek Mound, both of which are in the French Broad River watershed. The latest phase of construction occurred between 580 and AD 600. Nine distinct phases of occupation and use have been identified by archaeologists. Towards the end of the period, a large ditch was dug around the mound.

It is considered to be a part of the Hopewell tradition of Native American cultural networking. Evidence of wide-reaching trade, including copper possibly from the Ohio River Valley and mica possibly from Macon County, has been found there. The site was used intensively for ceremonial activity and communal feasting. Numerous artifacts, including pottery, seashells, quartz crystals, minerals and metal items, have been found there. Large amounts of seeds and faunal remains were also deposited at the site, probably from feasting.

== Archaeology ==
The first modern archaeologist to report the site was David Warren, who performed an archaeological survey of the Biltmore Estate in 1984. Archaeologists from Appalachian State University began excavating the site in 2000.
