= Vie et Mort de l'Ordre du Temple Solaire =

1994 book by Carl-A. Keller and Raphaël Aubert

- Cover of the first edition
- Author: Carl-A. Keller; Raphaël Aubert
- Language: French
- Subject: Order of the Solar Temple
- Publisher: Éditions de l'Aire
- Publication date: December 1994
- Publication place: Switzerland
- Pages: 125
- ISBN: 2-88108-372-2
- OCLC: 1442517906
- Dewey Decimal: 289.9

Vie et Mort de l'Ordre du Temple Solaire (transl. Life and Death of the Order of the Solar Temple) is a 1994 book about the Order of the Solar Temple, written by Carl-A. Keller and Raphaël Aubert. The Solar Temple was a notorious group active in Switzerland in the 1990s, known for the mass suicides of several of its members throughout the 1990s. The book was published in December 1994 by Éditions de l'Aire, just two months after the first deaths. It was the first book about the group.

The first section written by Aubert summarizes the events and facts that were known then, while Keller's section analyzes the religious beliefs and documentation of the OTS, placing them in the context of western esotericism. It also includes several of the OTS's own texts in the book. It received a mixed reception, with some reviews praising its analysis but others accusing it of being too sympathetic to the group.

== Background ==
The Order of the Solar Temple was a religious group active in several French speaking countries. 53 of its members died in a mass suicide in Switzerland in October 1994. In the immediate aftermath there was mystery about what had led to the deaths and much press interest.

The book was written by Carl-A. Keller and Raphaël Aubert. Keller was a Swiss theologian and professor, known for his previous writings on comparative religion. Aubert was a journalist for Radio Suisse Romande. Aubert stated he did not want to "sensationalize" the story and enlisted Keller (a former professor of his) to analyze the group through a religious lens. The authors said they wished to "retrace the black novel of the Order of the Solar Temple, if only for the sake of historical memory".

== Contents ==
The book is split into three parts, the first of which is a beginning section written by Aubert that recounts the facts and background details of the group that were then known. The second section is a collection of primary source documents written by the OTS, followed by a third part written by Keller that analyzes them and their beliefs.

Aubert recounts the facts and known sequence of events of the discovery of the deaths, sourcing this from media accounts. He discusses what is known about the leaders (Luc Jouret and Joseph Di Mambro) and their history together. Keller's section analyzes the religious dimension of the group. Focusing on the theological rather than material aspects, it attempts to give an objective look at the beliefs of the group, which it places in the context of western esotericism. Keller does not discuss them primarily as a cult, but as a religious group, saying that "to try to understand is to refrain from judging". Keller argues that by committing mass suicide, the members ended the "material" existence of the OTS, but that in their theology "beings who belong to the spirit world cannot die". He analyzes what the documents may have meant to the group, as well as the symbolism and ideas they expressed. He compares the beliefs to Christian thought, contrasting its lack of the Christian concepts of grace and forgiveness.

They disregard popular theories that were being circulated at the time, involving external involvement in the case, though note that future evidence could change this. The book argues that the financial problems and interests of the group were not what led to the deaths, and it was instead fueled by their religious beliefs. It also criticizes the anti-cult movement, partially blaming it for the events that occurred: "valiant anti-cult warriors are never innocent when the fortunes of a marginal community turn to disaster".

== Publication ==
The book was published by Éditions de l'Aire. It was published just two months after the first deaths, and was the first book about the group. Keller stated it was the largest of his theology books, and that he expected a large print run. Five months following the book's publications, several conferences were given by Keller alongside a former member of the OTS, where he discussed the ideas he proposed in the book.

== Reception ==
Anna Lietti, writing for Le Nouveau Quotidien, praised the book, saying its merit lay in Keller's willingness to confront the questions raised by the OTS affair. Describing Keller as "treating [the OTS's texts] as documents as worthy of respect as the Bible" in his analysis, she said its "intellectual approach deserves to be applauded". She said its thesis was "explosive" in that Keller did not merely not pass judgement on the OTS but argue that its theology could teach lessons to Christians – but said that Keller ultimately concluded that the OTS lack of the Christian concept of grace and forgiveness was a fundamental difference between the two. Lietti noted it was likely the first of many books about the OTS.

La Tribune complimented the book as a "valuable tool" for those wishing to look into the organization, noting its appeal to those who wanted more information that was not otherwise available. La Gruyère said the book did not answer questions, but that instead Keller "raises new ones and creates doubt", and that for answers one would have to wait for another book to be published; it described Aubert's section as not adding new information to the case, though described its intention as "commendable" in allowing the reader to follow the sequence of events. It described Keller's analysis as "interesting and fascinating", but said that it must be taken "with a grain of salt", given that the analysis was based on documents whose authorship and circumstances of creation were uncertain, and that while the theory of mass suicide worked for some victims others had bullet wounds, which were not adequately explained by Keller's theories.

Pierre Huguenin of L'Hebdo criticized the book. He described it as being a "tribute" to the group's two leaders, condemning the anti-cult movement instead of the OTS. Huguenin criticized its theological positions as too sympathetic to the group, saying "how can we evaluate grace, recognize the chosen ones, when we refuse to consider evil, when we dismiss the devil?" He noted Keller's personal history testifying in favor of the Unification Church, which he ties to the broader treatment of the word "cult" as a pejorative, though concludes by stating that "without freedom of assembly and speech, granted to cults and their opponents alike, there is no freedom at all." A response to this article written by a vicar who Huguenin had noted as using the term "new religious movements" instead of "cult" also criticized the book, and defended himself by saying he was willing to "call what is a "cult" a cult" but that it was important to not demonize everything. A description in the publication Domaine Public described it as an "unseemly absolution" of the OTS.

Jean-Luc Chaumeil, a French specialist in neo-Templarism, disagreed with Keller's theories, asserting that the supposed OTS documents were not actually written by the group and were designed to manipulate investigators. Le Nouveau Quotidien described Chaumeil's ideas as conspiracy theories. A former member of the OTS described the book as "honestly analyzing" the group, and expressed that they wished it was more well known than the more surface-level literature popular with the media. Le Matin said the book was a "prelude to the flood of books, testimonies, investigations and TV films which will feed, in the months and years to come, on the ashes of Cheiry and Salvan."
