= Nude Before a Mirror =

1955 painting by Balthus

- Artist: Balthus
- Year: 1955
- Medium: Oil on canvas
- Dimensions: 190 cm × 164 cm (75 in × 64.5 in)
- Location: Metropolitan Museum of Art; New York City
- Accession: 1975

Nude Before a Mirror (originally known as Nu devant une cheminée) is a 1955 painting by Polish-French artist Balthus.

The painting depicts a nude woman before a mirror, which is a typical subject for Balthus, a fact that caused controversy in his early career. This painting is also referred to as Nude in Front of a Mantel.

It is part of the collection of the Metropolitan Museum of Art, and was donated to the museum by art collector and banker Robert Lehman in 1975.
