= The Last Castle (book) =

2017 book

- Author: Denise Kiernan
- Language: English
- Genre: Non-fiction
- Published: 2017
- Publication place: United States

The Last Castle is a 2017 book by Denise Kiernan about the creation of the Biltmore Estate in North Carolina.

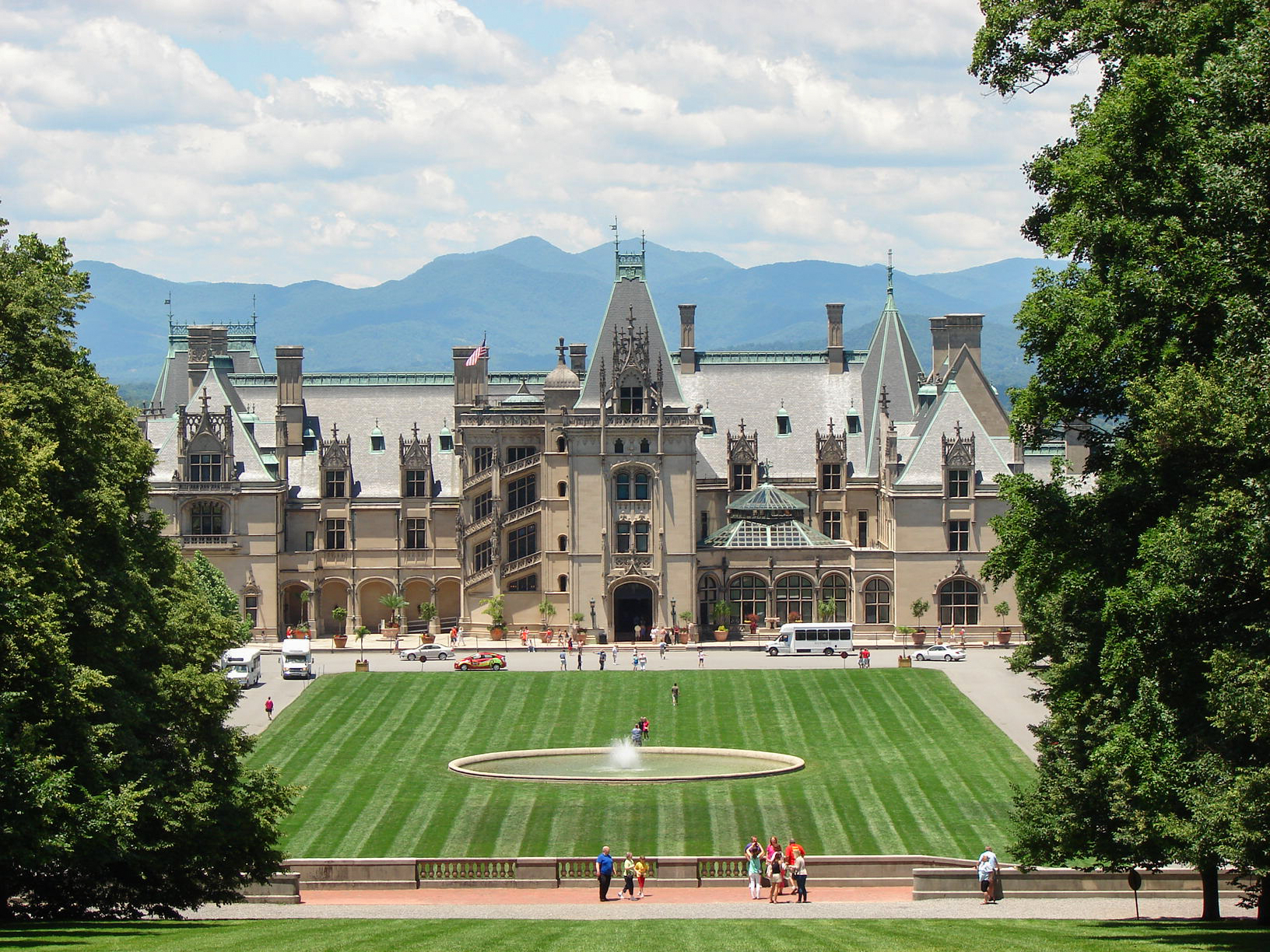
Photo of the Biltmore Estate

== Synopsis ==
The book covers the life of George Washington Vanderbilt II, an American shipping heir who commissioned the Biltmore Estate, and his wife Edith Stuyvesant Gerry.

== Audiobook ==
An audiobook, narrated by Kiernan, was produced by Brilliance Audio.

== Reception ==
Vicky Ward, in a review for The New York Times, wrote that "Kiernan's wider lens on the Gilded Age compensates for her protagonists' insipidness. The book's vitality lies in the details she reveals about the architects, writers, artists and peers of the Vanderbilts who spent time at Biltmore." Kirkus Reviews gave the book a mixed review, writing that "One-dimensional characters undermine the potential drama of life within a castle." Stuart Ferguson of The Wall Street Journal called it an "affectionate portrait of Biltmore and its sometimes turbulent history".
