= Raphaël Aubert =

Swiss writer and essayist

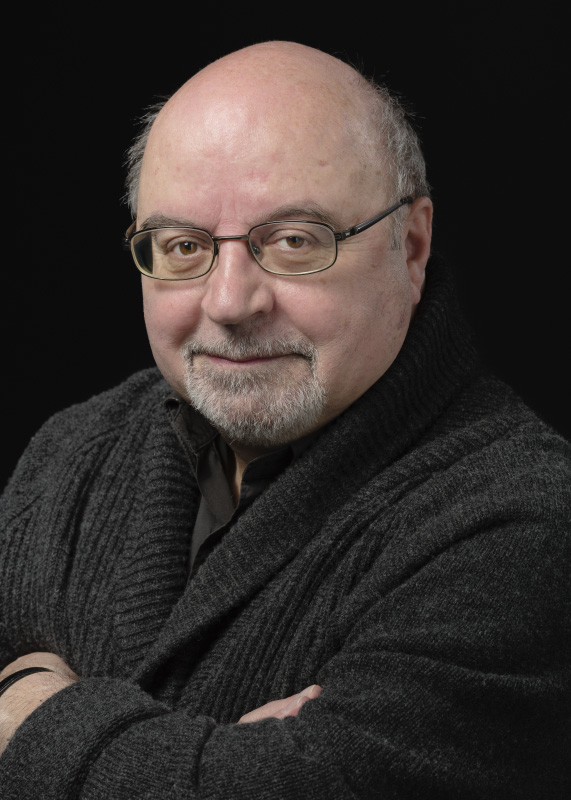
Raphaël Aubert

Raphaël Aubert (born 1953 in Lausanne, Switzerland) is a Swiss writer and essayist.

== Biography ==
=== Early life and education ===
Raphaël Aubert was brought up in a family of artists. He studied in the Faculty of Arts and Theology at University of Lausanne and in Paris.

=== Career ===
His first book Proche de l’argile ou la Remontée, a collection of poems, was published in 1975. He has since then published ten books including short stories and some novels, especially La bataille de San Romano (The Battle of San Romano), the action of which starts at the Louvre and questions the mysteries of Paolo Uccello's famous painting, and La Terrasse des éléphants (Elephants's terrace), novel of the encounter and destiny during the last years of the Vietnam's war.

As a journalist for Radio Télévision Suisse, he has travelled to Russia and various eastern countries, the Near East, the United States and Asia.

His essays include studies of André Malraux and Salman Rushdie, the latter titled L’affaire Rushdie (The Rushdie Affair), which garnered interest as it was the first study in French on the Indo-British author. In Le Paradoxe Balthus (The Balthus Paradox), he develops an iconoclastic argument based on Balthus’s famously controversial painting, La Leçon de guitare (The Guitar Lesson).

Aubert contributes to various reviews in Switzerland and in France, among which art press and Le Passe Muraille. He is one of the Swiss correspondents of the "Research and Information Circle André Malraux" and he contributed to the André Malraux Dictionary (Paris, CNRS Editions, 2011 ISBN 978-2-271-06902-3).

In 2014, he received the State of Vaud Literature Prize and in 2015, he was knighted in Arts and Letters by the French Ministry of Culture and Communication.

== Selected works ==
- L'Absolu et la métamorphose, Genève, Labor et Fides, 1985 (ISBN 2-8309-0043-X)
- L'Affaire Rushdie, Paris, Le Cerf, 1990 (ISBN 2-204-04193-9)
- Aubert, Raphaël; Keller, Carl-Albert (1994). Vie et mort de l'Ordre du Temple Solaire. Editions Jouvence. Vevey: Ed. de l'Aire. ISBN 978-2-88108-372-3.
- La Bataille de San Romano, Vevey, L'Aire bleue, 2006 (ISBN 2-88108-769-8)
- Malraux ou la Lutte avec l'ange, Genève, Labor et Fides, 2001 (ISBN 2-8309-1026-5)
- Le Paradoxe Balthus, Paris, La Différence, 2005 (ISBN 2-7291-1585-4)
- Dieu est-il violent? Paris, Bayard, 2008 (ISBN 978-2-227-47753-7)
- La Terrasse des éléphants Vevey, L'Aire, 2009 (ISBN 2-88108-894-5); L'Aire bleue, 2011, 2015 (ISBN 9782881088940)
- Chronique des treize lunes. Journal 2008, Vevey, L'Aire, 2009 (ISBN 2-88108-893-7)
- Malraux & Picasso Une relation manquée, Paris/Gollion, Infolio, 2013 (ISBN 978-2-88474-892-6)
- Cet envers du temps. Journal 2013, Vevey, L'Aire, 2014 (ISBN 978-2-94053-720-4)
- Le Voyage à Paris. Un carnet de Pierre Aubert, Lausanne, art&fiction, 2017 (ISBN 978-2-940570-25-6)
- Balthus L'Antimoderne, Paris/Gollion, Infolio, 2019 (ISBN 978-2-88474-430-0)
