= Biltmore Estate =

Historic house in North Carolina, US

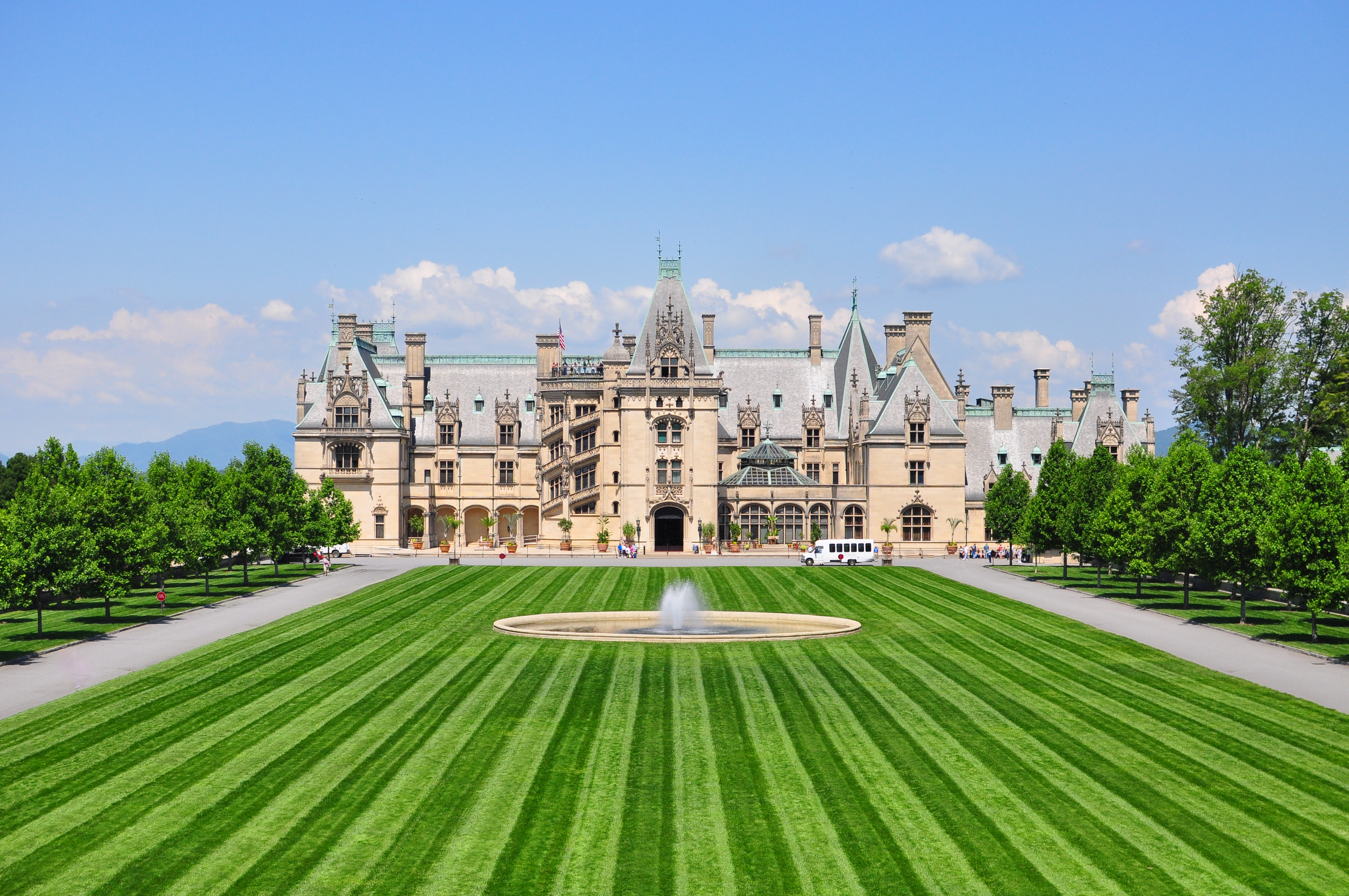
- The estate's Biltmore Mansion in 2013

General information
- Architectural style: Châteauesque
- Location: Buncombe County, North Carolina, U.S.
- Coordinates: 35°32′24″N 82°33′07″W
- Year built: 1889–1895
- Construction started: 1889
- Completed: 1895

Design and construction
- Architects: Richard Morris Hunt (house); Frederick Law Olmsted (landscape)

Website
- www.biltmore.com
- Biltmore Estate
- U.S. National Register of Historic Places
- U.S. National Historic Landmark District
- NRHP reference No.: 66000586
- Added to NRHP: October 15, 1966

Biltmore Estate is a historic house museum and tourist attraction in Asheville, North Carolina, United States. The main residence is the Biltmore House (or Biltmore Mansion), a Châteauesque-style mansion built for George Washington Vanderbilt II between 1889 and 1895. It is the largest privately owned house in the United States at 178,926 sq ft (16,622.8 m^{2}) of floor space and 135,280 sq ft (12,568 m^{2}) of living area. It is still owned by George Vanderbilt's descendants and remains one of the most prominent examples of Gilded Age mansions.

== History ==
George Washington Vanderbilt II began to make regular visits with his mother Maria Louisa Kissam Vanderbilt to the Asheville area in the 1880s, at the height of the Gilded Age. He loved the scenery and climate so much that he decided to build a summer house in the area which he called his "little mountain escape". His older brothers and sisters had built luxurious summer houses in places such as Newport, Rhode Island, the Gold Coast of Long Island, and Hyde Park, New York.

=== Development ===
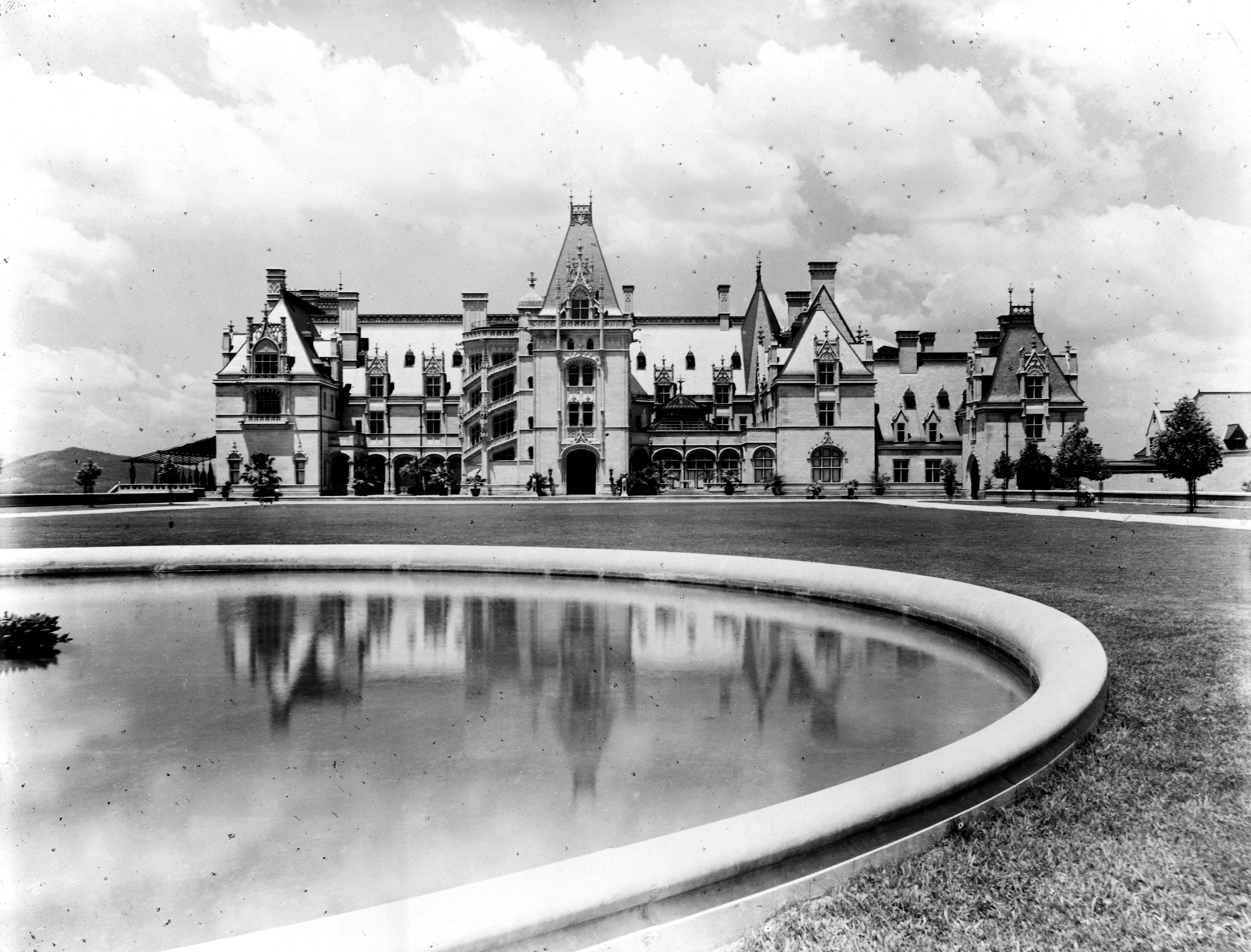
c. 1900

Vanderbilt named his estate Biltmore, combining De Bilt (his ancestors' place of origin in the Netherlands) with more, an open, rolling land. He eventually bought 125,000 acres (51,000 ha) composing nearly 700 parcels, including over 50 farms and at least five cemeteries. A portion of the estate was once the community of Shiloh. A spokesman for the estate said that much of the land had been "in very poor condition, and many of the farmers and other landowners were glad to sell."

Construction of the house began in 1889. A woodworking factory and brick kiln were built on site, and a 3-mile (5 km) railroad spur was constructed to bring materials to the building site. Construction on the main house required the labor of about 1,000 workers and 60 stonemasons. Vanderbilt made extensive trips overseas during construction to purchase thousands of furnishings, including tapestries, carpets, prints, linens, and decorative objects dating from the 15th century to the late 19th century. Among the few American-made items were the more practical oak drop-front desk, rocking chairs, walnut grand piano, and bronze candlesticks.

=== 1890s to 1950s ===
Vanderbilt opened his opulent estate on Christmas Eve of 1895 to family and friends from across the country who were encouraged to enjoy leisure and country pursuits. The Gilded Age mansion reportedly cost $5 million (equivalent to about $194 million today) to construct. Guests to the estate over the years included novelists Edith Wharton and Henry James, ambassadors Joseph Hodges Choate and Larz Anderson, and U.S. presidents. Vanderbilt married Edith Stuyvesant Dresser in 1898 in Paris, France. Their only child, Cornelia Stuyvesant Vanderbilt, was born at Biltmore in the Louis XV room in 1900 and grew up at the estate.

Vanderbilt initiated the sale of 87,000 acres (350 km^{2}; 35,000 ha) to the federal government, stressed by Congressional passage of income tax and the expensive maintenance of the estate. He died unexpectedly in 1914 of complications from an emergency appendectomy, and his widow completed the sale. She carried out her husband's wish that the land remain pristine and that property become the nucleus of the Pisgah National Forest. She then began consolidating her interests, selling Biltmore Estate Industries in 1917 and Biltmore Village in 1921. She intermittently occupied the house, living in an apartment created in the former Bachelors' Wing, until the marriage of her daughter Cornelia to John Francis Amherst Cecil in April 1924. The Cecils had two sons who were born at Biltmore in the same room where their mother was born.

Cornelia and her husband opened Biltmore to the public at the request of the City of Asheville in March 1930, in an attempt to bolster the estate's finances during the Great Depression. The city hoped to revitalize the area with tourism.

Biltmore closed from 1941 to 1945 during World War II. In 1942, 62 paintings and 17 sculptures were moved to the estate by train from the National Gallery of Art in Washington, D.C. to protect them in the event of an attack on the United States. The Music Room on the first floor was never finished, so it was used for storage until 1944, when the possibility of an attack became more remote. Among the works stored were the Gilbert Stuart portrait of George Washington and works by Rembrandt, Raphael, and Anthony van Dyck. Gallery director David Finley was a friend of Edith Vanderbilt and had stayed at the estate.

The Cecils divorced in 1934. Cornelia left the estate never to return, but John Cecil maintained his residence in the Bachelors' Wing until his death in 1954. Their eldest son George Henry Vanderbilt Cecil occupied rooms in the wing until 1956. At that point, Biltmore House ceased to be a family residence and was operated as a historic house museum. Their younger son William A. V. Cecil Sr. returned to the estate in the late 1950s and partnered with his brother to manage its financial trouble. They worked to create the profitable and self-sustaining enterprise that their grandfather had envisioned.

=== 1960s to present ===
William Cecil inherited the estate upon the death of his mother Cornelia in 1976. His brother George inherited the more profitable dairy farm, which was spun off as Biltmore Farms.

William Cecil turned over control of the company to his son William A. V. Cecil Jr. in 1995, while celebrating the estate's centenary. The Biltmore Company is privately held. Of the 8,000 acres (3,200 ha) that make up Biltmore Estate, only 1.36 acres (5,500 m^{2}; 0.55 ha) are within the city limits of Asheville, and the Biltmore House is not part of any municipality.

The estate was designated a National Historic Landmark in 1963, and remains a major tourist attraction in western North Carolina, with around 1.4 million visitors each year.

William A. V. Cecil died in October 2017, and his wife Mimi died the following November. Their daughter Dini Pickering is board chairman, and their son Bill Cecil is chief executive officer. The house is assessed at $157.2 million, although county property taxes are paid on only $79.1 million due to an agricultural deferment.

The estate was temporarily closed after Hurricane Helene in September 2024. The group sales office was destroyed, but the Biltmore House, conservatory, and several structures survived without serious damage. The estate's operators subsequently pledged $2 million for hurricane recovery efforts in Western North Carolina. Biltmore Estate reopened in November 2024.

== Architecture ==
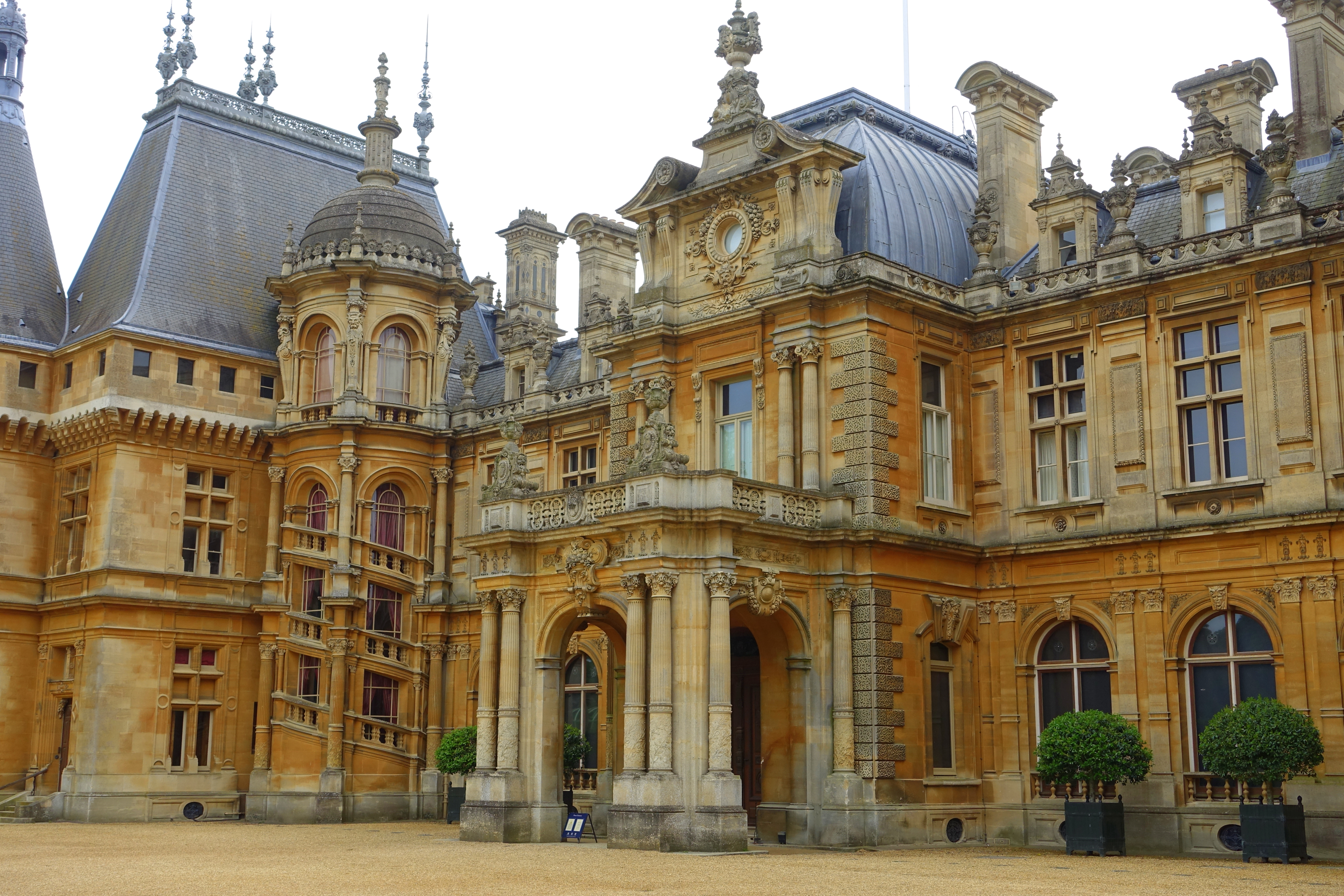
Waddesdon Manor in Buckinghamshire was a principal source of inspiration for the east elevation

Vanderbilt commissioned prominent New York architect Richard Morris Hunt, who had previously designed houses for various Vanderbilt family members, to design the house in the Châteauesque style. Hunt used French Renaissance châteaux as inspiration. Vanderbilt and Hunt had visited several in early 1889, including Château de Blois, Chenonceau and Chambord in France and Waddesdon Manor in England. These estates shared steeply pitched roofs, turrets, and sculptural ornamentation.

=== Form and facade ===
Hunt sited the four-story Indiana limestone-built home to face east, with a 375-foot (114 m) facade to fit into the mountainous topography behind. The facade is asymmetrically balanced with two projecting wings connecting to the entrance tower: an open loggia is to the left side and a windowed arcade to the right, which holds the Winter Garden that was fashionable during the Victorian era. The entrance tower contains a series of windows with decorated jambs that extend from the front door to the most decorated dormer at Biltmore on the fourth floor. The carved decorations include trefoils, flowing tracery, rosettes, gargoyles and, at prominent lookouts, grotesques. The staircase is one of the more prominent features of the east facade, with its three-story, highly decorated winding balustrade with carved statues of St. Louis and Joan of Arc by the Austrian-born architectural sculptor Karl Bitter.

External videos
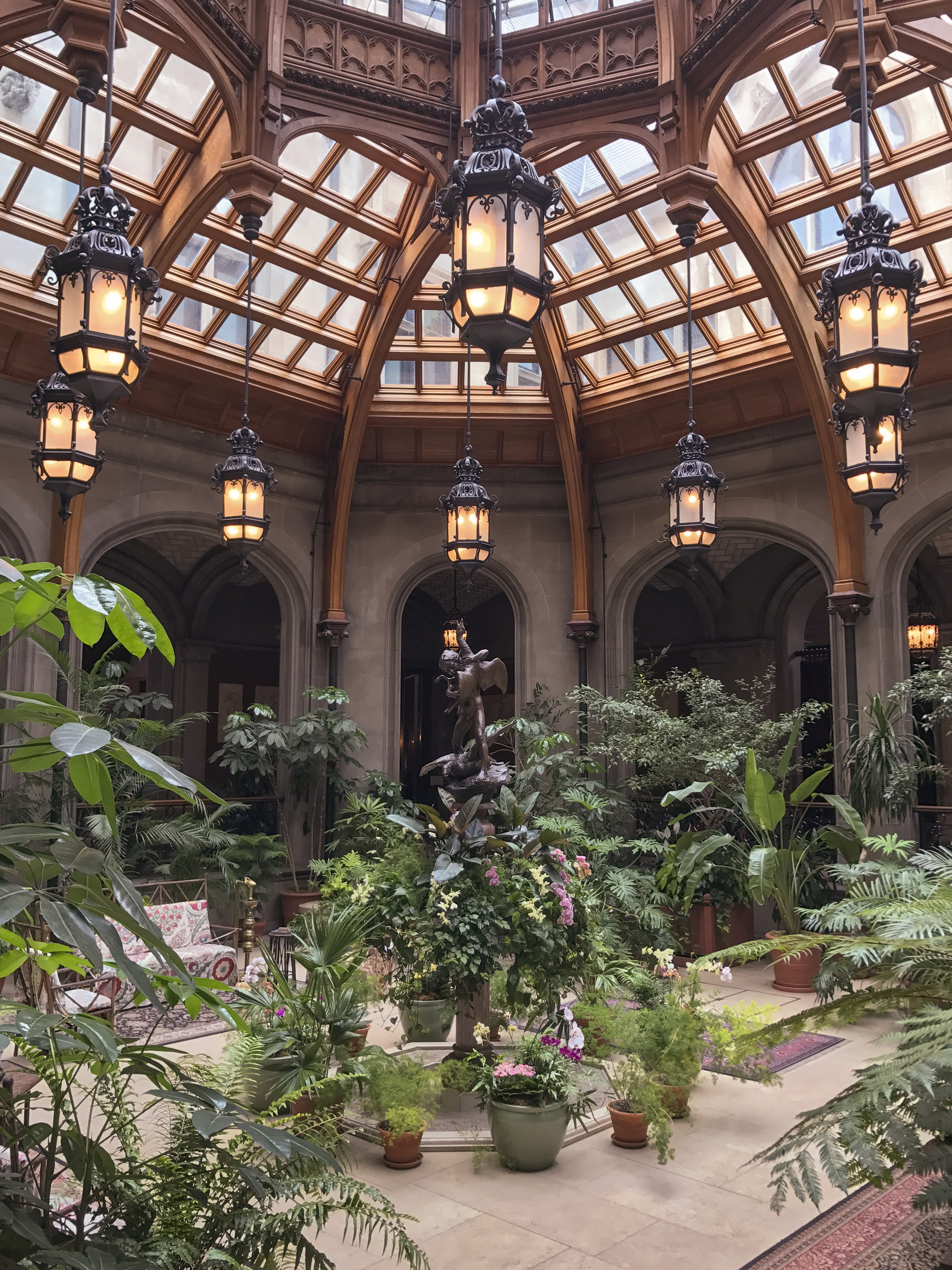
- Biltmore, 24:36, C-SPAN

The south facade is the house's smallest and is dominated by three large dormers on the east side and a polygonal turret on the west. An arbor is attached to the house and is accessed from the library, which is located on the ground floor. On the north end of the house, Hunt placed the attached stables, carriage house and its courtyard to protect the house and gardens from the wind. The 12,000 sq ft (1,100 m^{2}) complex housed Vanderbilt's prized driving horses. The carriage house opposite the stables stored his twenty carriages in addition to any of his guests' carriages.

The rear western elevation is less elaborate than the front facade, with some windows not having any decoration at all. Two matching polygonal towers in the center are connected to the polygonal south turret by an open loggia that opens the main rooms of the house to the views of the Blue Ridge Mountains in the distance. The loggia is decorated overhead with terracotta tiles set in a herringbone pattern. The self-supporting ceramic tile vault and arch system was used extensively inside and outside of Biltmore, and was patented by Rafael Guastavino, a Spanish architect and engineer who personally supervised the installation. The limestone columns were carved to reflect the sunlight in aesthetically pleasing and varied ways per Vanderbilt's wish. The rusticated base is a contrast to the smooth limestone used on the remainder of the house.

The steeply pitched roof is punctuated by sixteen chimneys and covered with slate tiles that were affixed one by one. Each tile was drilled at the corners and wired onto the attic's steel infrastructure. Copper flashing was installed at the junctions to prevent water from penetrating. The fanciful flashing on the ridge of the roof was embossed with George Vanderbilt's initials and motifs from his family crest, though the original gold leaf no longer survives.

=== Interiors ===
Biltmore has 4 acres (1.6 ha) of floor space and 250 rooms in the house, including 35 bedrooms for family and guests, 43 bathrooms, 65 fireplaces, three kitchens and 19th-century novelties such as an electric Otis elevator, forced-air heating, centrally controlled clocks, fire alarms and a call bell system. Biltmore House had electricity from the time it was built, though initially it received direct current electricity due to Vanderbilt's friendship with Thomas Edison. With electricity less safe and fire more of a danger at the time, the house had six separate sections divided by brick fire walls.

==== First floor ====
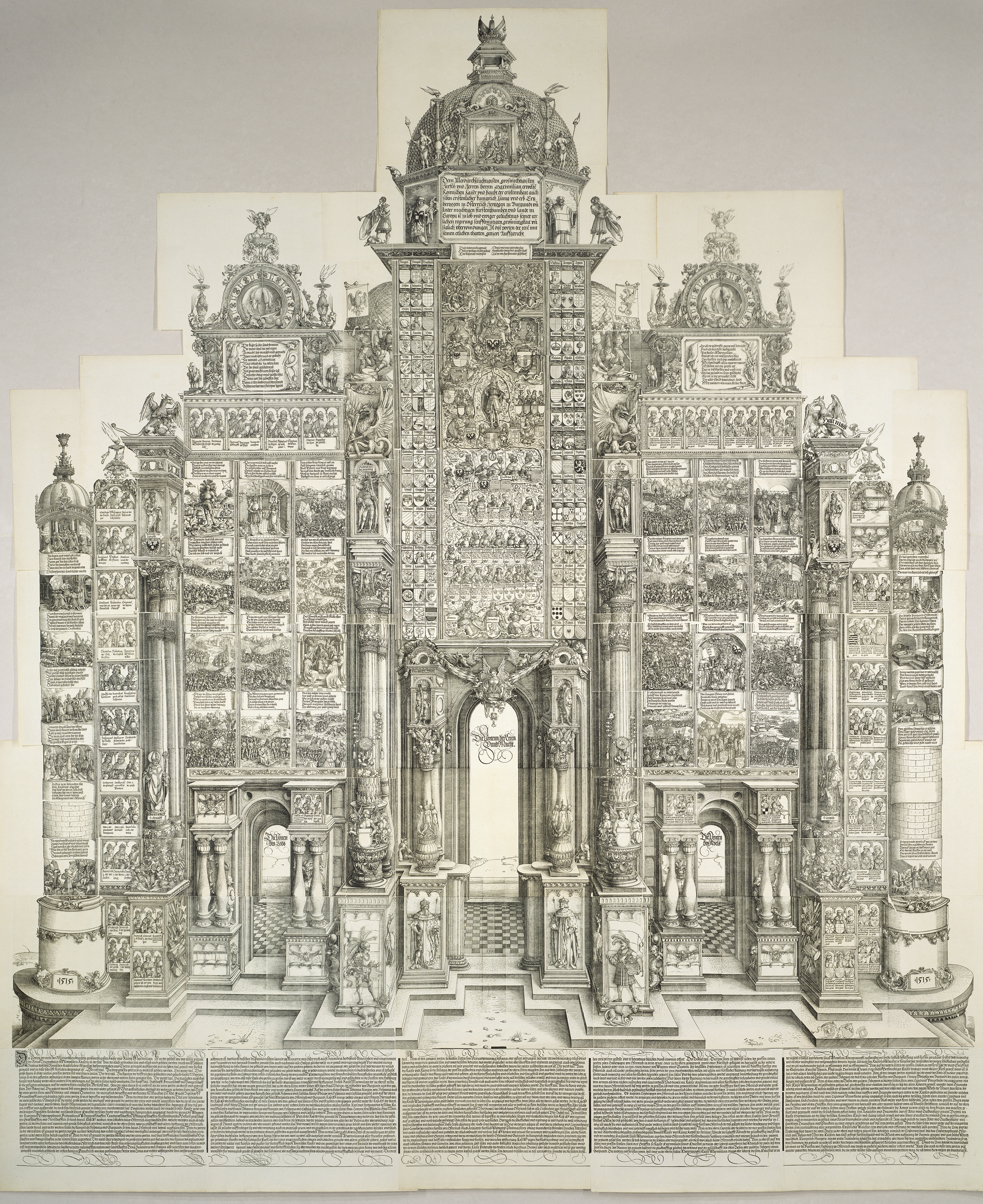
A print of the Triumphal Arch hangs above a mantel at Biltmore

The principal rooms of the house are located on the ground floor. To the right of the marbled Entrance Hall, the octagonal sunken Winter Garden is surrounded by stone archways with a ceiling of architecturally sculptured wood and multifaceted glass. The centerpiece is a marble and bronze fountain sculpture titled Boy Stealing Geese, created by Karl Bitter. On the walls just outside the Winter Garden are copies of the Parthenon Frieze. The Banquet Hall is the largest room in the house, measuring 42 ft × 72 ft (13 m × 22 m), with a 70-foot (21 m) high barrel-vaulted ceiling. The table can seat 64 guests and is surrounded by rare Flemish tapestries and a triple fireplace that spans one end of the hall. On the opposite end of the hall is an organ gallery that houses a 1916 Skinner pipe organ. Left unfinished with bare brick walls, the Music Room was not completed and opened to the public until 1976. It showcases a mantel designed by Hunt, and a print of the large engraving by Albrecht Dürer called the Triumphal Arch, commissioned by Holy Roman Emperor Maximilian I. The mantel had been stored in the stable for over 80 years.

To the left of the entrance hall is the 90-foot (27 m) long Tapestry Gallery, which leads to the Library, featuring three 16th-century tapestries representing The Triumph of Virtue Over Vice. Elsewhere on the walls are family portraits by John Singer Sargent, Giovanni Boldini, and James Whistler. The two-story Library contains over 10,000 volumes in eight languages, reflecting George Vanderbilt's broad interests in classic literature as well as works on art, history, architecture, and gardening. The library also houses a concealed passageway that leads to the guest rooms.

The second-floor balcony is accessed by an ornate walnut spiral staircase. The Baroque detailing of the room is enhanced by the rich walnut paneling and the ceiling painting, The Chariot of Aurora, brought to Biltmore by Vanderbilt from the Palazzo Pisani Moretta in Venice, Italy. The painting by Giovanni Antonio Pellegrini is the most important work by the artist still in existence.

==== Second floor ====
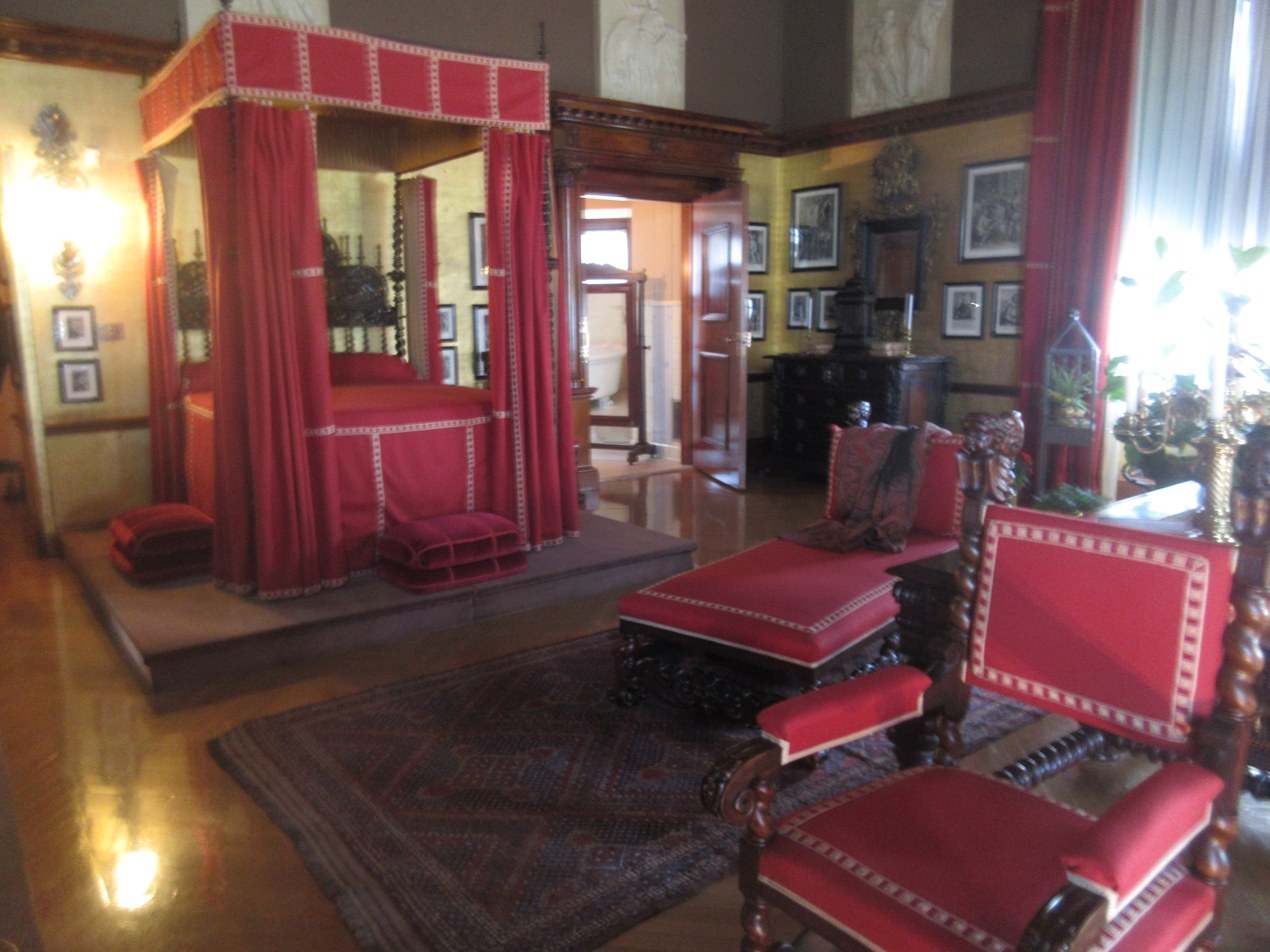
Master bedroom of George Vanderbilt

The second floor is accessed by the cantilevered Grand Staircase of 107 steps spiraling around a four-story, wrought-iron chandelier holding 72 light bulbs. The second-floor Living Hall is an extension of the grand staircase as a formal hall and portrait gallery, and was restored to its original configuration in 2013. Several large-scale masterpieces are displayed in the hall, including two John Singer Sargent portraits of Biltmore's architect, Richard Morris Hunt, and landscaper, Frederick Law Olmsted, both commissioned for the home by Vanderbilt. Located nearby in the south tower is George Vanderbilt's gilded bedroom with furniture designed by Hunt. His bedroom connects to his wife's Louis XV-style, oval-shaped bedroom in the north tower through a Jacobean carved oak paneled sitting room with an intricate ceiling.

The suite of rooms includes:

- the Damask Room, with silk damask draperies and distinct damask-style wallpaper;
- the Claude Room, named after one of Vanderbilt's favorite artists, Claude Lorrain;
- the Tyrolean Chimney Room, featuring an overmantel made from a Kachelofen, a type of tile oven that stored large amounts of heat, then released it slowly over a long period; and
- the Louis XV Room, the most grand, so named due to its architectural scheme and furnishings that were very popular in the late nineteenth century. The suite was restored and opened to the public for the first time in 100 years in 2011.

==== Third and fourth floors ====
The third floor has a number of guest rooms with names that describe the furnishing or artist that they were decorated with. The fourth floor has 21 bedrooms that were inhabited by housemaids, laundresses, and other female servants. Also included on the fourth floor is an Observatory with a circular staircase that leads to a wrought iron balcony with doorways to the rooftop where Vanderbilt could view his estate. Male servants were not housed here, however, but instead resided in rooms above the stable and complex.

==== Bachelors' Wing ====
The Billiard Room is decorated with an ornamental plaster ceiling and rich oak paneling and was equipped with both a custom-made pool table and a carom table (table without pockets). The room was mainly frequented by men, but ladies were welcome to enter as well. Secret door panels on either side of the fireplace led to the private quarters of the Bachelors' Wing where female guests and staff members were not allowed. The wing includes the Smoking Room, which was fashionable for country houses, and the Gun Room, which held mounted trophies and displayed George Vanderbilt's gun collection.

==== Basement ====
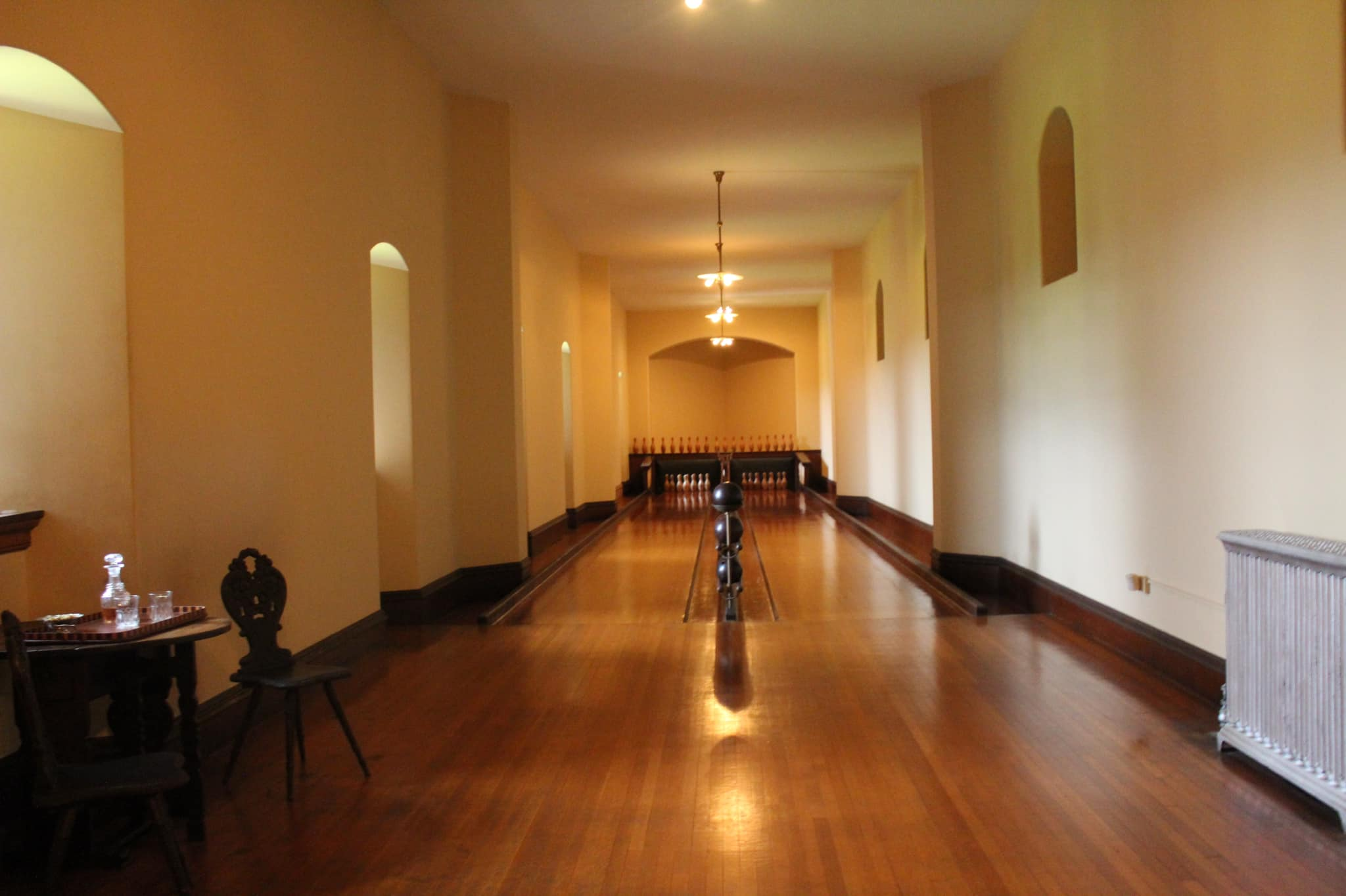
The bowling alley in the basement of Biltmore

The basement level featured activity rooms, including an indoor, 70,000 U.S. gallons (260,000 L; 58,000 imp gal) heated swimming pool with underwater lighting, a bowling alley, and a gymnasium with once state-of-the-art fitness equipment. The service hub of the house is also found in the largest basement in the country. It holds the main kitchen, pastry kitchen, rotisserie kitchen, walk-in refrigerators that provided an early form of mechanical refrigeration, the servants' dining hall, laundry rooms, and additional bedrooms for staff.

==== Conservatory ====
In the conservatory, which has many flowers and trees growing in it, there is also an elevated model railway.

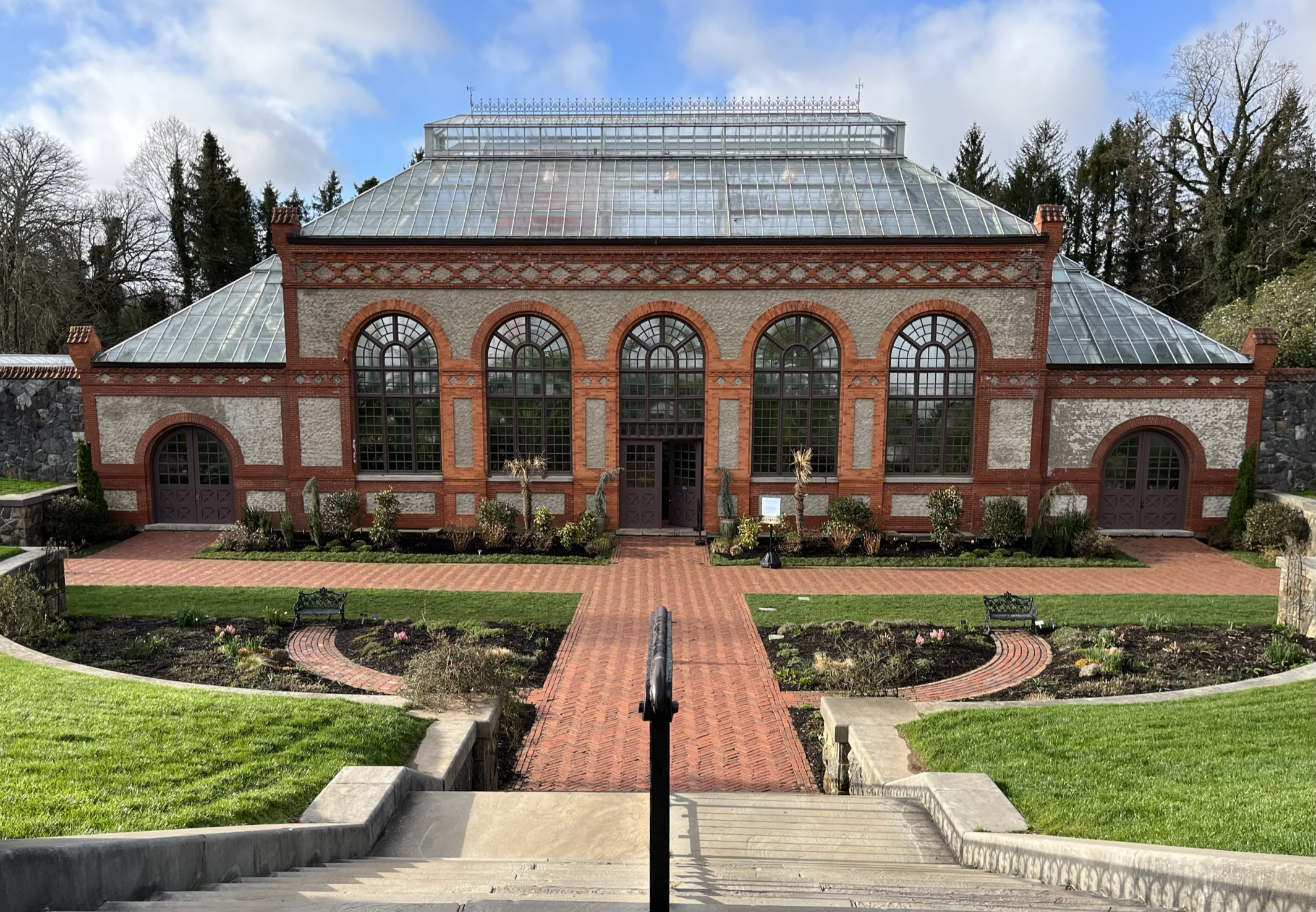
Conservatory in 2023

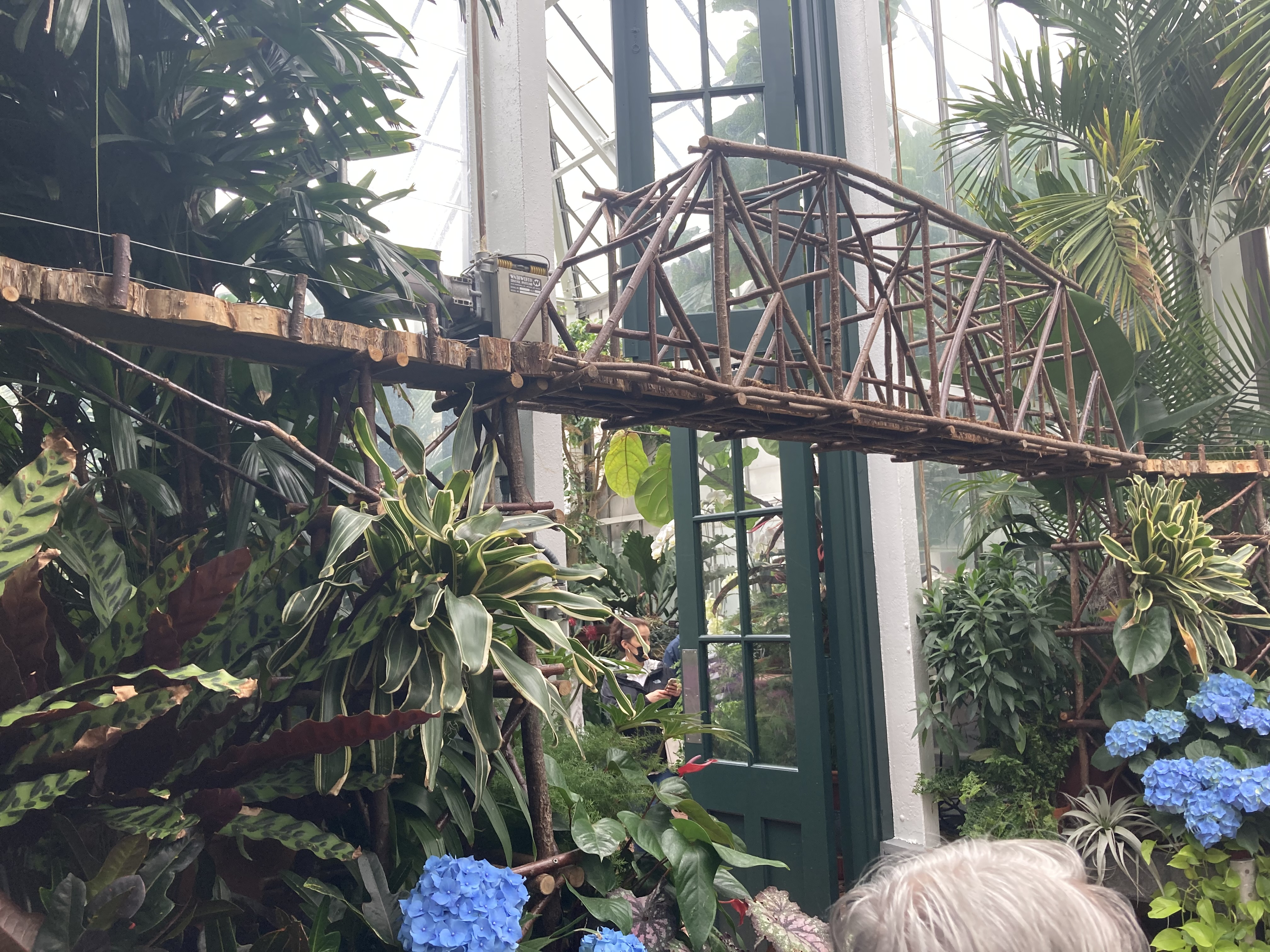
Model railway

== Park and landscape ==
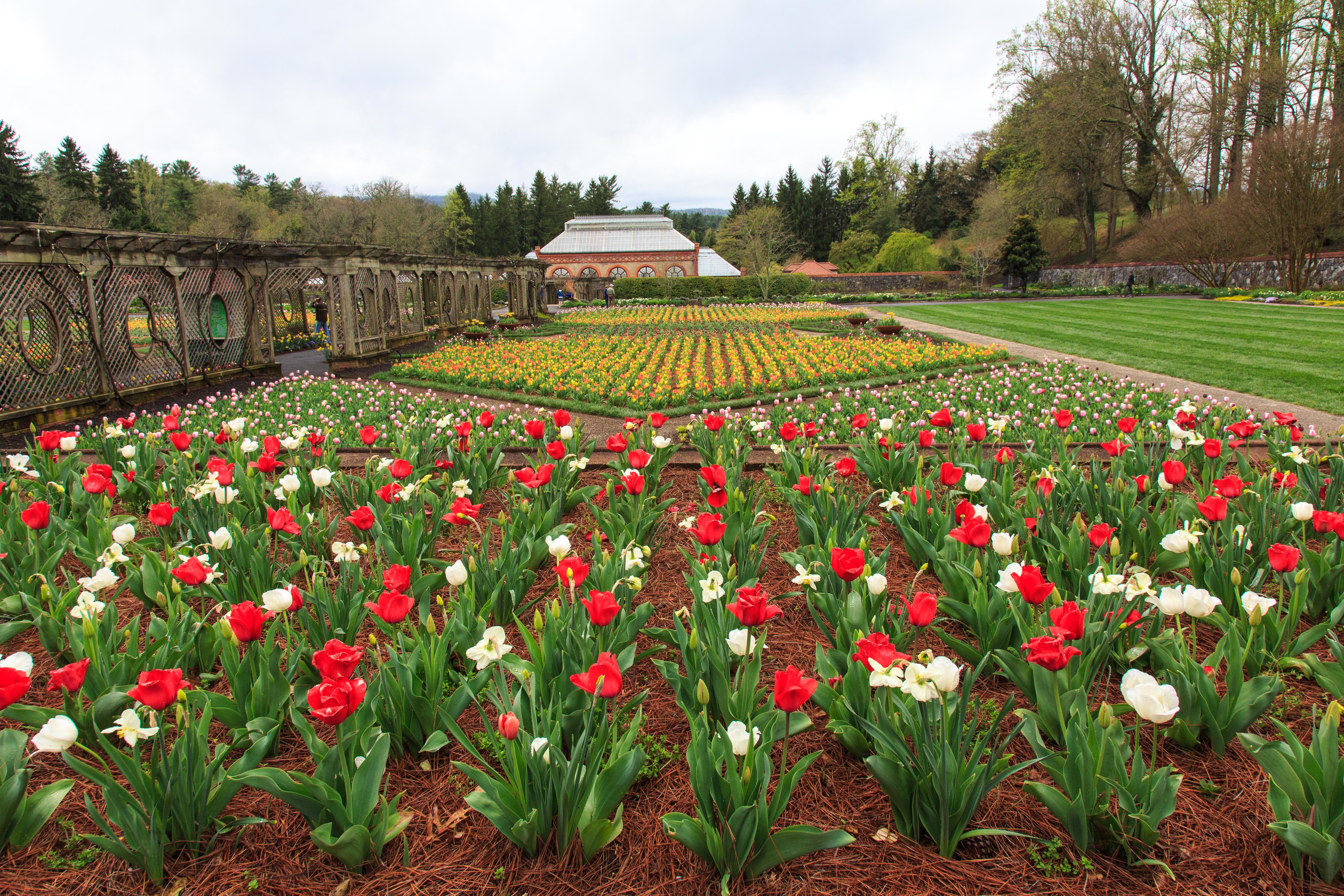
Part of the gardens

Vanderbilt envisioned a park-like setting for his home and employed landscape architect Frederick Law Olmsted to design the grounds. Olmsted was not impressed with the condition of the 125,000 acres (195 sq mi; 510 km^{2}) and advised having a park surround the house, establishing farms along the river, and replanting the rest as a commercial timber forest, a plan to which Vanderbilt agreed. Gifford Pinchot and later Carl A. Schenck were hired to manage the forests, with Schenck establishing the first forestry education program in the U.S. in 1898, the Biltmore Forest School, on the estate grounds.

Another important aspect of the landscaping was the intentionally rustic four-mile (5 km) approach track that began at the brick quoined and pebbledash stucco Lodge Gate at the edge of Biltmore Village and ended at the sphinx-topped stone pillars at the Esplanade. In between, the lane was densely planted along the borders with natural and uncultivated-looking foliage and shrubbery to provide a relaxing journey for guests. Olmsted made sure to incorporate 75 acres (30 ha) of formal gardens, which had been requested by Vanderbilt for the grounds directly surrounding the house. He constructed a Roman formal garden, a formal garden, a bush and tulip garden, water fountains, and a conservatory with individual rooms for palms and roses. There was also a bowling green, an outdoor tea room, and a terrace to incorporate the European statuary that Vanderbilt had brought back from his travels. At the opposite end of the Esplanade is the Rampe Douce (French for "gentle/soft ramp"), a graduated stairway zigzagging along a rough-cut limestone wall that leads to the grassy slope known as the Vista, topped with a statue of Diana, the goddess of the hunt.

Water was an important aspect of Victorian landscaping, and Olmsted incorporated two elements for the estate: the Bass Pond created from an old creek-fed millpond and the Lagoon. Each was used for guest recreation such as fishing and rowing. To supply water for the estate, Olmsted engineered two reservoirs. One was a spring-fed man-made lake on nearby Busbee Mountain. The other was a man-made, brick-lined reservoir, located behind the statue of Diana in the Vista, at an elevation of approximately 266 ft (81 m) above the Esplanade.

== Estate ==
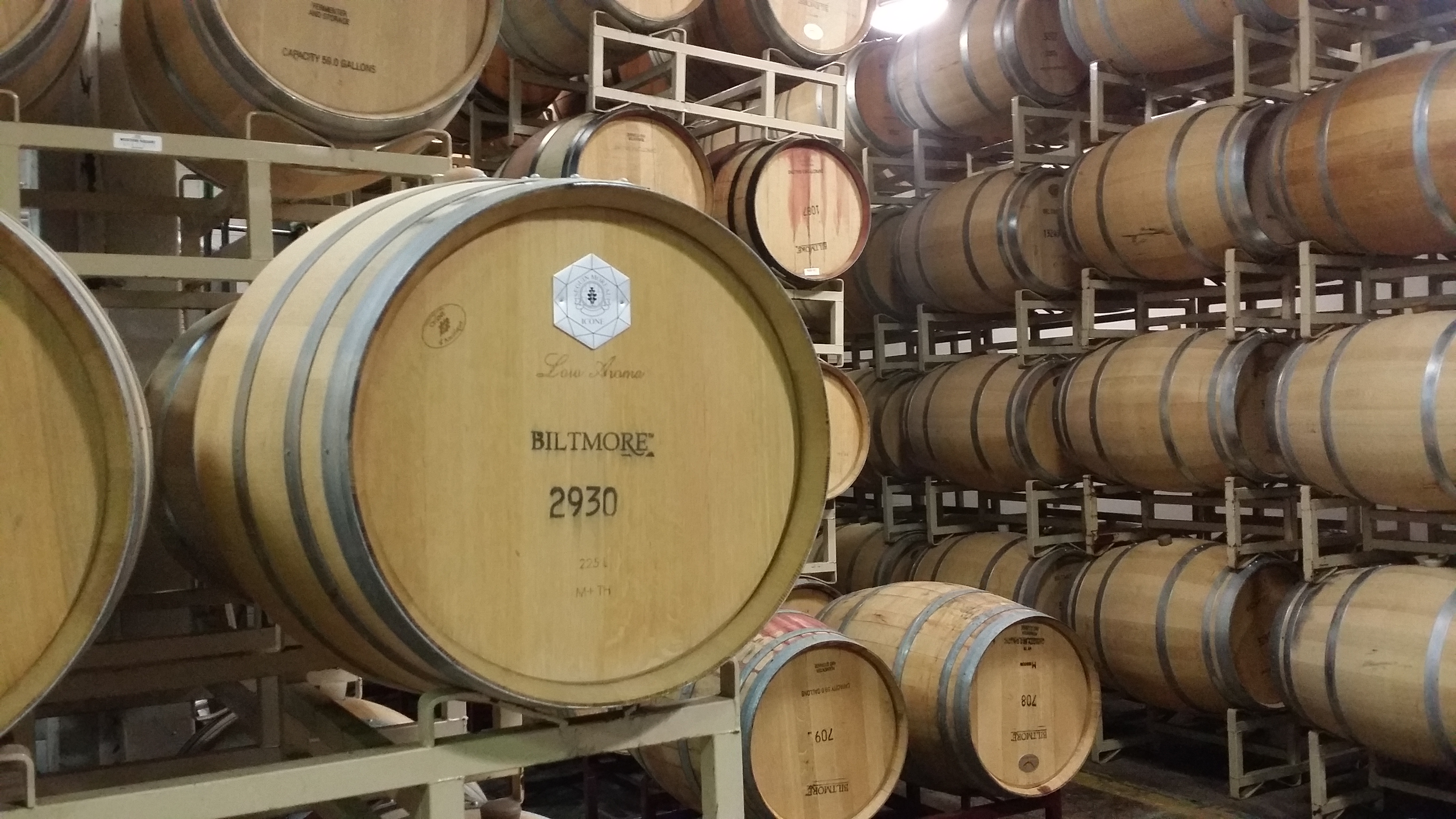
Storage facility in the Biltmore Winery, 2017

Vanderbilt's idea was to replicate the working estates of Europe. He asked Richard Morris Hunt and Frederick Law Olmsted to design a village with architecturally compatible buildings and picturesque landscaping. He intended it to be a source of income through rental cottages, a place to help carry out philanthropic programs, and an easy point of access between the estate and the train station. The result was Biltmore Village. The village was mostly designed by Richard Sharp Smith, supervising architect of Biltmore, included rental cottages complete with plumbing and central heating, a post office, shops, doctor's office, school, and a church, known today as the Cathedral of All Souls.

Intending the estate to be self-supporting, Vanderbilt set up scientific forestry programs, poultry farms, cattle farms, hog farms, and dairy. His wife, Edith, also enthusiastically supported agricultural reform and promoted the establishment of a state agricultural fair. In 1901, the Vanderbilts provided financial assistance to Biltmore Industries, started by Biltmore Village resident Eleanor Vance, which taught young people how to make hand-carved furniture, woven baskets, homespun wool fabric, and more.

The estate today covers approximately 8,000 acres (13 sq mi; 32 km^{2}) and is bisected by the French Broad River. The estate is overseen by The Biltmore Company, a trust set up by the family; as of the end of 2025, William A.V. Cecil, Jr. serves as President and CEO of The Biltmore Company, and his wife Virginia Cecil oversees the equestrian center at the estate and is on the Biltmore board of directors. The company is a large enterprise that is one of the largest employers in the Asheville area. Restaurants were opened in 1979, 1987, and 1995, and four gift shops in 1993. The former dairy barn was converted into the Biltmore Winery in 1985. The 210-room luxury hotel, named The Inn on Biltmore Estate, opened in 2001. In 2010, the estate opened Antler Hill Village, consisting of shops and restaurants, as well as a remodeled winery, and connected farmyard. In 2015, the Village Hotel on Biltmore Estate, a more casual option to The Inn with 209 rooms, was opened in Antler Hill Village.

== In popular culture ==
The estate has been used on numerous occasions as a filming location for movies and television shows. These have included The Swan (1956), Being There (1979), The Private Eyes (1980), Mr. Destiny (1990), The Last of the Mohicans (1992), Forrest Gump (1994), Richie Rich (1994), My Fellow Americans (1996), Patch Adams (1998), Hannibal (2001) and The Odd Life of Timothy Green (2012).

The Hallmark Channel movie A Biltmore Christmas was filmed at Biltmore House in January 2023, and was first aired the following November, being the first movie to be set at Biltmore House. The 2017 non-fiction book The Last Castle by Denise Kiernan details the estate's history.

== See also ==
- List of Gilded Age mansions
- Biltmore Mound
