= Joseph Breitbach =

French-German playwright, novelist and journalist

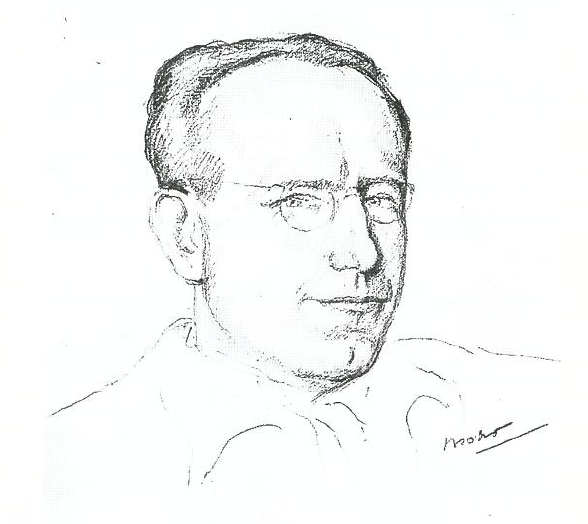
- Portrait by Alexander Mohr
- Born: 1903; Koblenz
- Died: 1980 (aged 76–77); Munich
- Known for: Bericht über Bruno

Joseph Breitbach (1903–1980) was a French-German playwright, novelist and journalist. He was born in Koblenz and died in Munich. He is best known for his novel Bericht über Bruno (Report on Bruno).

The Joseph-Breitbach-Preis is named after him.
