= Denise Kiernan =

American journalist, producer and author (born 1968)

- Kiernan at the 2026 Texas Book Festival
- Born: July 31, 1968 (age 58)
- Education: New York University (BA, MA)
- Occupations: Journalist, author
- Spouse: Joseph D'Agnese
- Writing career
- Notable work: The Girls of Atomic City
- Website: www.denisekiernan.com

Denise Kiernan (born July 31, 1968) is an American journalist, producer and author who lives in Asheville, North Carolina. She has authored several history titles, including Signing Their Lives Away, Signing Their Rights Away and The Girls of Atomic City.

== Education ==
Kiernan graduated from the North Carolina School of the Arts with an emphasis in music. She earned a BA degree from New York University in 1991 and an MA from the Steinhardt School of Culture, Education, and Human Development of New York University in 2002.

== Biography ==
Kiernan started out in journalism, and as a freelance writer, her work appeared in The New York Times, The Village Voice, The Wall Street Journal, and Ms. Magazine amongst other publications. She served as the head writer for Who Wants to Be a Millionaire during its first season. She has produced pieces for ESPN and MSNBC. Additionally, she has authored several popular history titles and has ghost written books for athletes, entrepreneurs and actresses. Her most recent book, The Girls of Atomic City: The Untold Story of the Women Who Helped Win World War II, traces the story of the women who worked on the Manhattan Project, unknowingly helping to create the fuel for the world's first atomic bomb. The Girls of Atomic City became a New York Times best seller in its first week of publication.

== Personal life ==
Kiernan is married to author, historian and journalist Joseph D'Agnese, with whom she co-authored several books including Signing Their Lives Away, Signing Their Rights Away and Stuff Every American Should Know.

== Books ==
- The Girls of Atomic City: The Untold Story of the Women Who Helped Win World War II (Touchstone, 2013) ISBN 978-1451617528
- Stuff Every American Should Know (Quirk Books, 2012) co-authored with Joseph D'Agnese ISBN 978-1594745829
- Signing Their Rights Away (Quirk Books, 2011) co-authored with Joseph D'Agnese ISBN 978-1594745201
- The Money Book for Freelancers, Part-Timers, and the Self-Employed (Three Rivers Press, 2010) co-authored with Joseph D'Agnese ISBN 978-0307453662
- Signing Their Lives Away (Quirk Books, 2009) co-authored with Joseph D'Agnese ISBN 978-1594743306
- The Indiana Jones Handbook (Quirk Books, 2008) co-authored with Joseph D'Agnese ISBN 978-1594742217
- The Last Castle (Touchstone, 2017) ISBN 978-1476794044
