= William Minor (poet) =

American poet (born 1969)

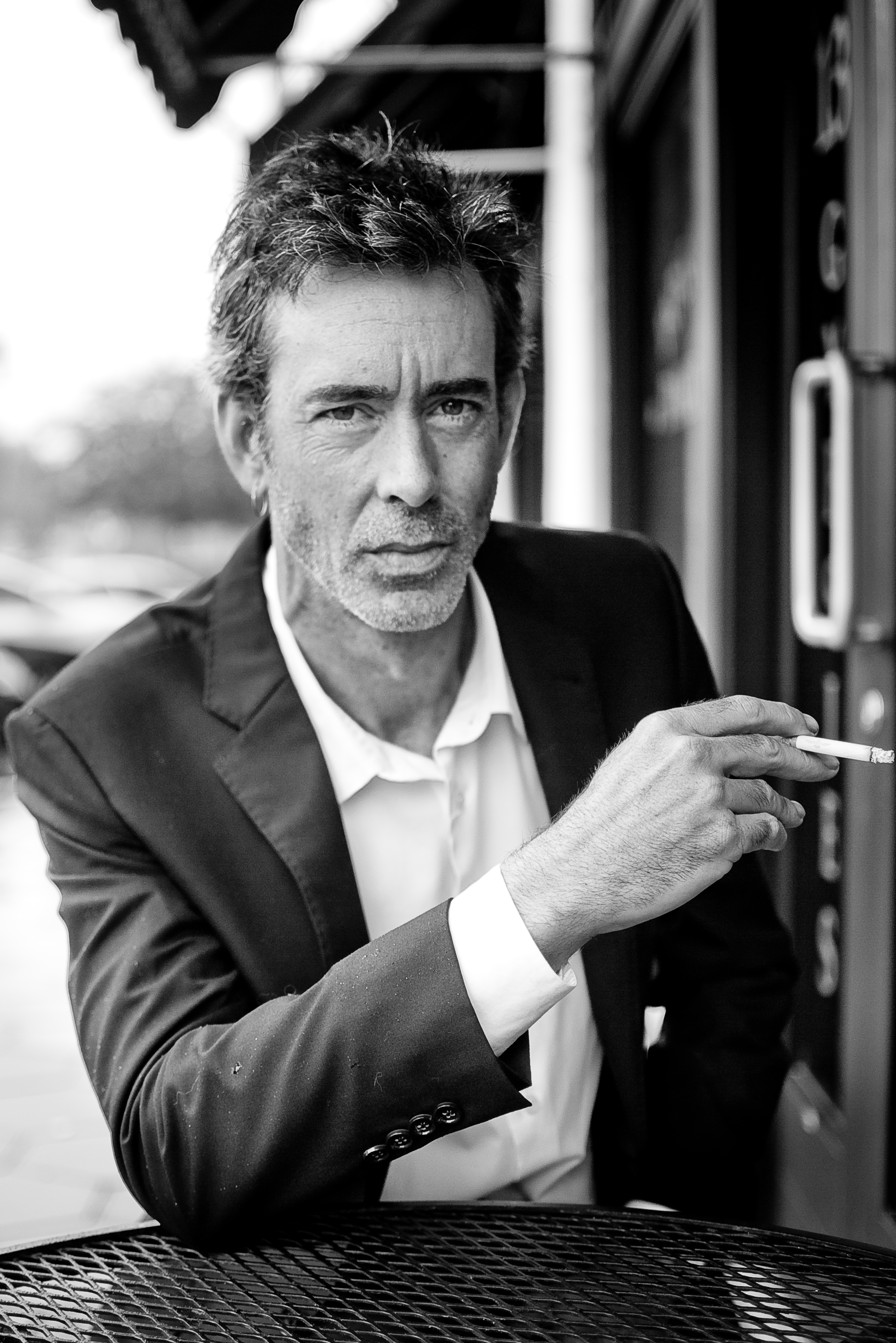
- Born: 2 December 1969 (age 56); Jacksonville, Florida
- Occupation: Poet
- Writing career
- Genre: Poetry
- Literary movement: Minimalism, Absurdism

William Minor (born December 2, 1969) is an American poet. His first book, Tree on the Outside, was published by Coracle in 2010, followed by Pigeons and Pussy (2013), The Balthus Poems (2018), Pieces in the Form of a Pear (2020), Flabby Preludes for a Dog (2024), and Sketches and Exasperations of a Big Wooden Dummy (2025). His poems have also appeared in ditch, Dusie, and 6x6, among others. He lives in Los Angeles.

== Poems online ==
- Selections from pigeons and pussy (via Shearsman)
- 5 poems (via Poetry Pacific)
