= List of tallest buildings in Asheville =

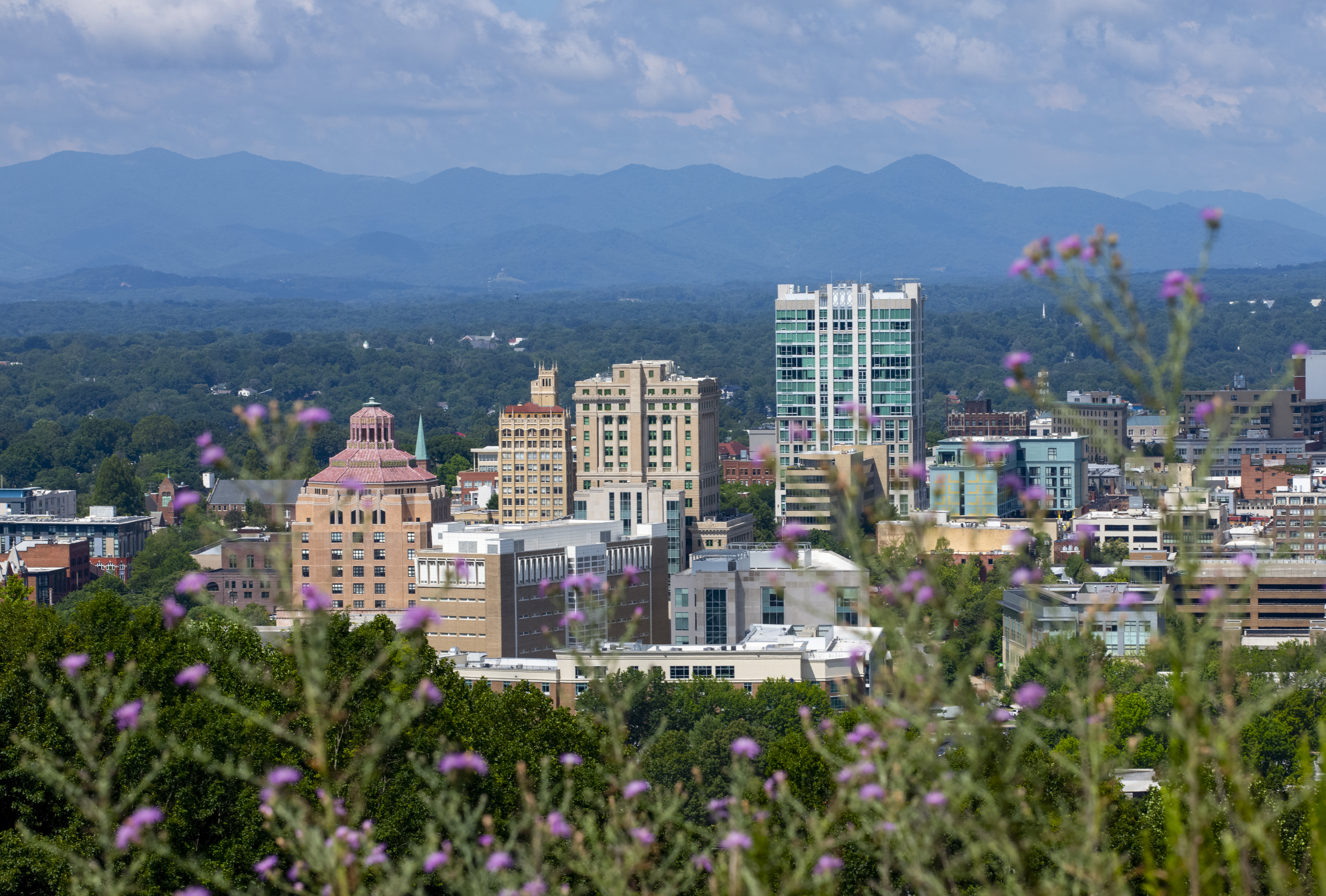
The skyline of Asheville in July 2023.

Asheville is the 12th-largest city in the U.S. state of North Carolina, it also is the county seat of Buncombe County. The city has a population of 95,311 people as of February 2026. The city has 12 high-rises that stand 130 ft (40 m) tall. As of February 2026, the tallest building in Asheville is the 230 ft (70 m) tall Buncombe County Courthouse, which was built in 1928.

The most recently completed high-rise is the 136 ft (41 m) tall Cambria Hotel, which was built in 2017.

== Tallest buildings ==
This list ranks buildings in Asheville that stand at least 130 ft (40 m) tall. Spires and other architectural details are included in the height of a building, however, antennas are excluded.

Tallest building in Asheville upon completion

Rank	Name	Image	Location	Height	Floors	Year	Purpose	Notes	References
1	Buncombe County Courthouse	Buncombe_County_Courthouse,_Asheville,_NC_(46691736112)	35°35′45″N 82°32′55″W	230 ft (70 m)6	16	1928	Government	Tallest building in Asheville.	
2	The Arras	The_Arras,_Asheville_(March_2023)_13	35°35′43″N 82°33′08″W	228 ft (69 m)	18	1965	Residential, Hotel, formerly Office	Originally known as the Northwestern Building. Renovated in 2019.	
3	Jackson Building		35°35′42″N 82°33′02″W	215 ft (66 m)	15	1925	Office	Tallest building in Asheville from 1925 to 1928.	
4	Asheville City Hall		35°35′44″N 82°32′54″W	191 ft (58 m)	9	1927	Government	Building features murals by Clifford Addams.	
5	Hotel Indigo	Hotel_Indigo_Asheville_1	35°35′48″N 82°33′30″W	169 ft (52 m)	13	2009	Hotel, Residential		
6	Battery Park Apartments	Battery_Park_Hotel_and_Grove_Arcade_buildings,_Asheville_NC_Feb_2019	35°35′47″N 82°33′25″W	157 ft (48 m)	14	1924	Residential	Tallest building in Asheville from 1924 to 1925.	
7	Renaissance Asheville Hotel	Renaissance_Hotel,_Asheville,_NC_(46019890984)	35°35′52″N 82°33′01″W	144 ft (44 m)	12	1973	Hotel		
8	Buncombe County Detention Center	Buncombe County Detention Center Asheville North Carolina Skyline July 2023 (cropped)	35°35′46″N 82°32′52″W	138 ft (42 m)	10	1995	Prison	Designed by O'Brien-Atkins.	
9	Cambria Hotel	Cambria_Suites_Hotel,_Asheville,_NC_(31801752907)	35°35′44″N 82°33′21″W	136 ft (41 m)	12	2017	Hotel	Tallest building in Asheville built in the 2010s.	
10	Vanderbilt Apartments	George_Vanderbilt_Hotel,_Asheville_NC_postcard_1920s	35°35′49″N 82°33′19″W	132 ft (40 m)	9	1924	Residential		
11	Public Service Building	Public_Service_Building_Asheville_1	35°35′40″N 82°33′20″W	130 ft (40 m)	9	1929	Office		
12	Flatiron Building	Flatiron_building_in_Asheville_North_Carolina_as_seen_from_the_roof_of_the_Woolworth_Building	35°35′42″N 82°33′19″W	130 ft (40 m)	8	1926	Hotel, formerly Office	Designed by Albert C. Wirth.	

== Timeline of tallest buildings ==
Name	Image	Years as tallest	Height	Floors
Battery Park Apartments	Battery_Park_Hotel,_Asheville,_NC_(46690362912)	1924-1925	157 ft (48 m)	14
Jackson Building		1925-1928	215 ft (66 m)	15
Buncombe County Courthouse	Buncombe_County_Courthouse,_Asheville,_NC_(46019892304)	1928-Present	230 ft (70 m)	16

== See also ==
- List of tallest buildings in North Carolina
- List of tallest buildings in Charlotte
- List of tallest buildings in Greensboro
- List of tallest buildings in Raleigh
- List of tallest buildings in Winston-Salem
