= Sunset Stampede =

The Sunset Stampede is an annual set of races hosted by the town of Asheville, North Carolina as part of its Mountain Sports Festival. It is sponsored by Asheville's Mission Hospital.
