= The Arras =

Tallest building in Asheville, North Carolina. Built in 1965

Coordinates: 35°35′43″N 82°33′08″W

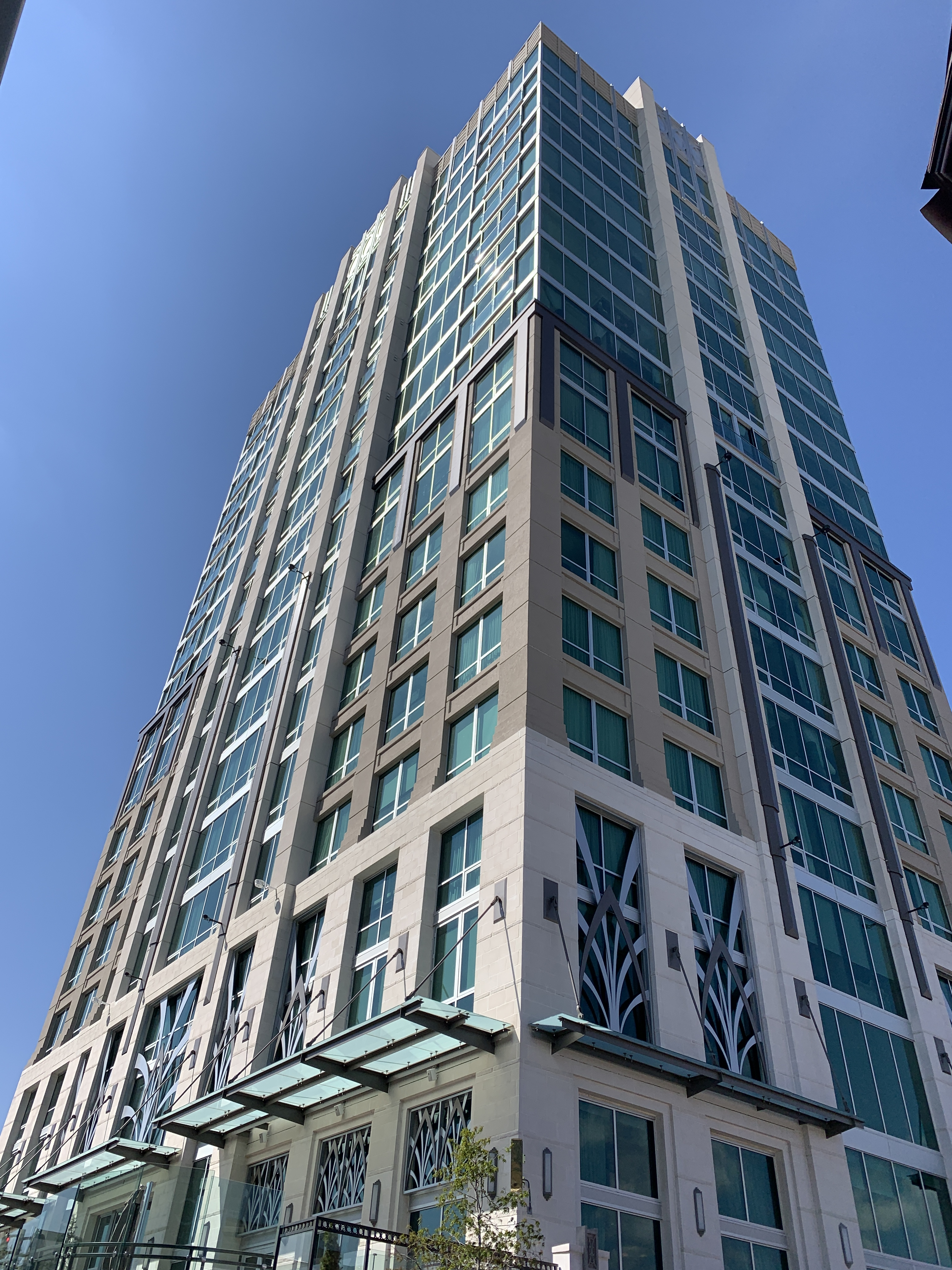
The Arras, after renovation of the original (1965) exterior.

The Arras (/ˈærəs/ ARR-əs) is the second tallest building (Note: News coverage said tallest) in Asheville, North Carolina with 19 stories and 201,000 square feet. It was built in 1965 as the Northwestern Bank Building and was later called the BB&T Building. In 2019, it reopened as the Art Deco style Kimpton Hotel Arras on floors 1 to 9, and Arras Private Residences condominium complex on floors 10-19 after a major renovation. The building is 228 feet tall.

== History ==
=== Office tower ===
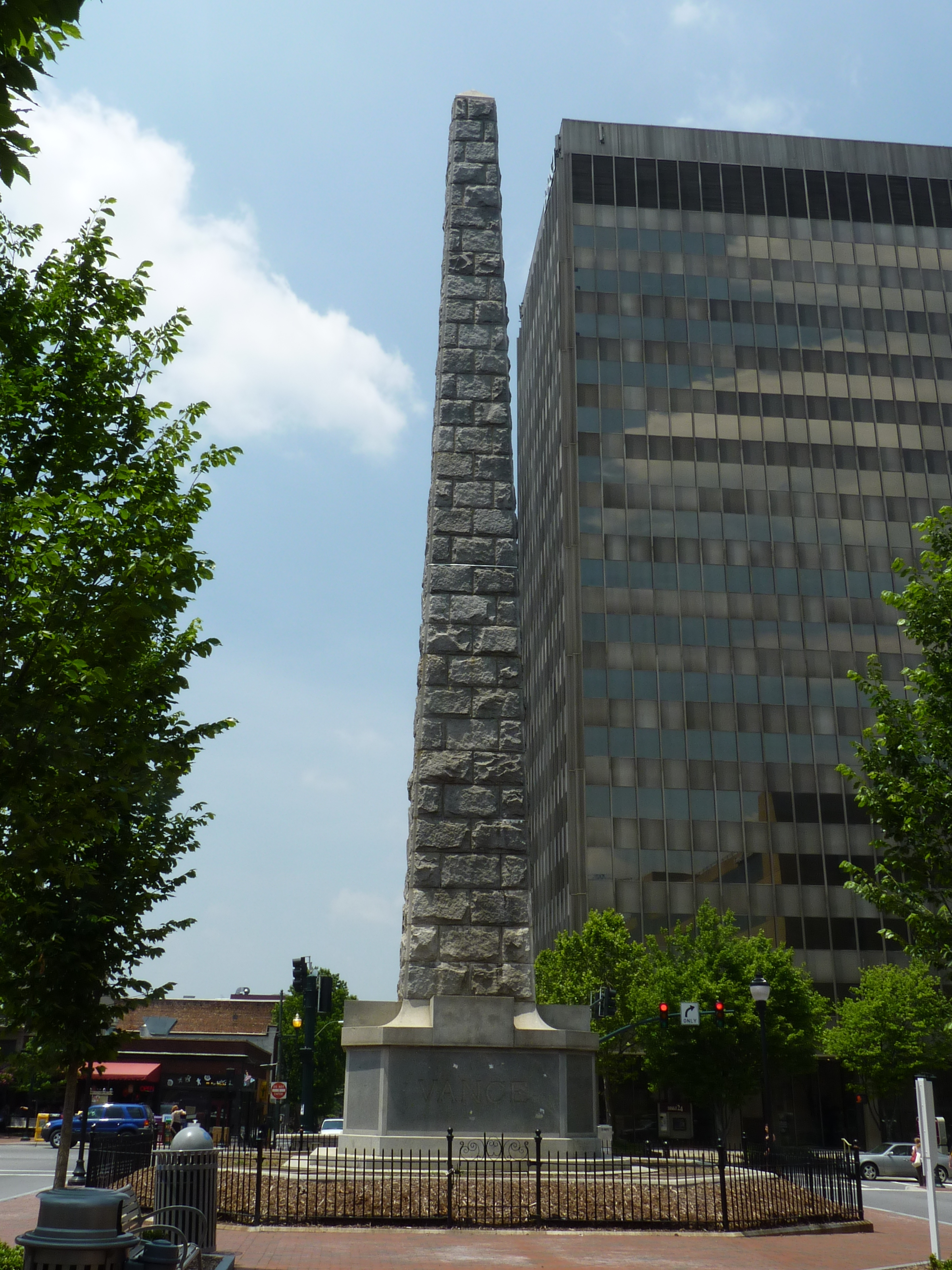
Zebulon Vance Monument in 2011 with The Arras in background, while still the BB&T Building, with original anodized aluminum curtain wall exterior in background

Groundbreaking took place in February 1964, with hundreds of people witnessing the start of one of the city's few major projects since the Great Depression. The Northwestern Bank Building opened October 23, 1965 as the state's tallest building west of Charlotte. (Note: According to this source) A newspaper account referred to the "anodized aluminum curtain wall" and called it "unique and aesthetically pleasing", and the building was considered a "construction milestone." Built like many skyscrapers of the time, the Northwestern Bank Building resembled the Seagram Building in New York City and IBM Plaza in Chicago, both designed by Ludwig Mies van der Rohe. A 2017 Asheville Citizen-Times article said "the opening of such a modern, imposing edifice was a source of pride for many in Asheville." On the other hand, an entire block had to be torn down, including the eight-story Langren Hotel built in 1912 and five other buildings. Glenn Wilcox Sr.'s Wilcox Travel and World Tours was an original tenant and remained in the building for 51 years. The City Club occupied the 16th floor.

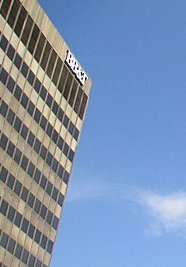
BB&T sign, when still the BB&T Building

When First Union Corp. took over Northwestern Financial Corp. in 1985, Northwestern had to sell some of its branches. Branch Banking & Trust Co. (BB&T) bought the Asheville branch and branches in Maggie Valley, Fletcher and Old Fort. By this time, according to a 2012 report on the city's architectural inventory, the building was considered "a substantial eyesore" and it was eventually referred to as "Big Brown & Tall". With significant problems such as leaks and heating system failure, it was considered "a symbol of Asheville's declining fortunes." BB&T located its regional office in the tower in September 1988 and the building's name changed to the BB&T Building. Asheville Building Associates filed for Chapter 11 bankruptcy and in November 1988 Wilcox and two partners bought the building for $6.8 million. Occupancy was at 70 percent as the former owners had done little to keep the building in good shape. The new owners formed Tower Associates and made renovations inside, but the exterior would have cost too much to update. Many considered the modern building to be out of place in Asheville, especially since it was so large. Still, occupancy increased to over 90 percent.

=== Hotel ===
On April 28, 2015, McKibbon Hotel Group chairman John McKibbon announced plans for an "upper-upscale" hotel called Vandre Hotel using six floors, with the building being renamed Nouveau Tower when the project was complete in 2017. The hotel would be McKibbon's fifth in Asheville. As of 2016, the renovation plan included a complete change in the exterior using steel, glass and synthetic stone, and elements of Art Deco that would help the building match other buildings downtown. The former office building would have 140 hotel rooms and 39 condominiums, also adding 35,300 square feet of parking. Glenn Wilcox and John McKibbon were partners in the project. The Asheville City Council approved the necessary rezoning January 12, 2016.

In September 2016, John McKibbon announced plans for a 128-room boutique hotel to be called The Arras, with two restaurants and 54 condominiums. The Kimpton Hotel Arras opened in November 2019, owned by Atlanta-based McKibbon Places, started earlier in the year, and managed by Tampa-based McKibbon Hospitality.
