= Asheville Zombie Walk =

The Asheville Zombie Walk started in October 2006 as a flash mob. Several hundred participants gathered in a cemetery in Asheville, North Carolina following prompts from MySpace and flyers. Throughout the years, the walk grew into the family-friendly Ashtoberfest, a program featuring additional events like zombie-themed bands and games.

During the 2008 presidential campaign between Barack Obama and John McCain, vice presidential candidate Sarah Palin made a campaign appearance in Asheville on World Zombie Day. Hundreds of zombie marchers broke off from the Zombie Walk to protest Palin's appearance at the town's civic center.

Founder Dan Burrello understood that Palin's appearance and the Zombie Walk might clash and was able to address the situation beforehand. Burrello said, “I mean, when you see 700 shambling dead zombies walking toward the Civic Center up the bridge, it would probably get the Secret Service's attention. So we gave them a heads up on it to make sure they know we're not doing any kind of protest or (are a) threat in anyway.”

The Asheville zombie Palin protestors appeared in several national media programs, including “Countdown with Keith Olbermann” on MSNBC.

In October 2011, the Zombie Walk moved from downtown Asheville to the Biltmore Square Mall on the outskirts of the city. Burello said having the walk at a mall was an homage to the 1978 classic zombie film “Dawn of the Dead.” One performer of note in 2011 was Secret Agent 23 Skidoo, who appears on the Grammy Award-winning album “All About Bullies. . . Big and Small.”

The Zombie Walk was discontinued as of 2017.
