= Flood Gallery Fine Arts Center =

- Established: 2005
- Location: Asheville, North Carolina
- Website: www.floodgallery.org

Flood Gallery Fine Arts Center is a non-profit contemporary art institution in the River Arts District in Asheville, North Carolina. It has made significant contributions to the region by cultivating a strong exhibitions program bringing in artists both national and international, and through its expansive arts in education programs.

== History ==
The Flood Gallery and Fine Arts Center is housed inside the Historical Phil Mechanic Studios Building (circa 1923). It was built originally as the Pierce-Young-Angel Food Storage Warehouse located near the French Broad River and Norfolk Southern Railroad in the industrial area currently known as the River Arts District. The Mechanic family purchased the building in the 70's, and it became a construction company. When Phil Mechanic died in the late 1990s, his son, Mitch Mechanic, inherited the building. Mitch and his wife, Jolene, converted the building into ateliers, or art studio spaces. After a massive upgrade to bring the 90-year-old building up to city code compliance, the place became Phil Mechanic Studios. In 2005, Jolene Mechanic, and popular local artist Sean "Jinx" Pace, collaborated and became co-founders and created the non-profit Flood Gallery and Fine Art Center. The Flood Gallery Fine Arts Center is currently directed by Carlos Steward the Editor in Chief of the Black Mountain Press.

Today, Phil Mechanic Studios has become a hub for art and science. They currently house two art galleries – the Flood Gallery and the Pump Gallery showcasing an ambitious exhibitions program for both local artists as well as national and international artists; artist studios, and a library featuring more than 1,000 books and films and internet capability for the artists in residence. In 2017 they moved to 850 Blue Ridge Rd in Black Mountain East of Asheville, NC.

== Exhibitions ==
The Flood Fine Arts Center opened its exhibition space in 2005, with international artist H.K. Zamani (a.k.a. Habib Kheradyar Zamani). Zamani has shown his work in Prague, the Czech Republic; Lublin, Poland; Graz, Austria; Frankfurt, Germany; Amsterdam, The Netherlands; Bangkok, Thailand; London, England; and now resides in Los Angeles, California where he shows work regularly. In the past five years, The Flood Fine Arts Center has hosted other internationally acclaimed artists including Jim Buonaccorsi, Nava Lubelski, Mike Estabrook, Cory Bradley, Mike Calway-Fagen, Allen Leper Hampton, Porge Buck, Heinz Kossler, and James Esber.

== Collections ==
The Flood Fine Arts Center houses 146 posters from the Iranian Revolution of 1979. This collection opens October 5, 2013 in four venues in Asheville, NC before traveling to galleries in Los Angeles, San Francisco, Seattle, Chicago, New York City and London. The exhibit catalogue is authored by Hamid Dabashi, of Columbia University with a foreword by Courtyard Gallery Director, Carlos Steward. This catalogue was published by the Black Mountain Press.
