= Buncombe County Courthouse =

Historic courthouse in North Carolina, US

- U.S. National Register of Historic Places
- U.S. Historic district – Contributing property
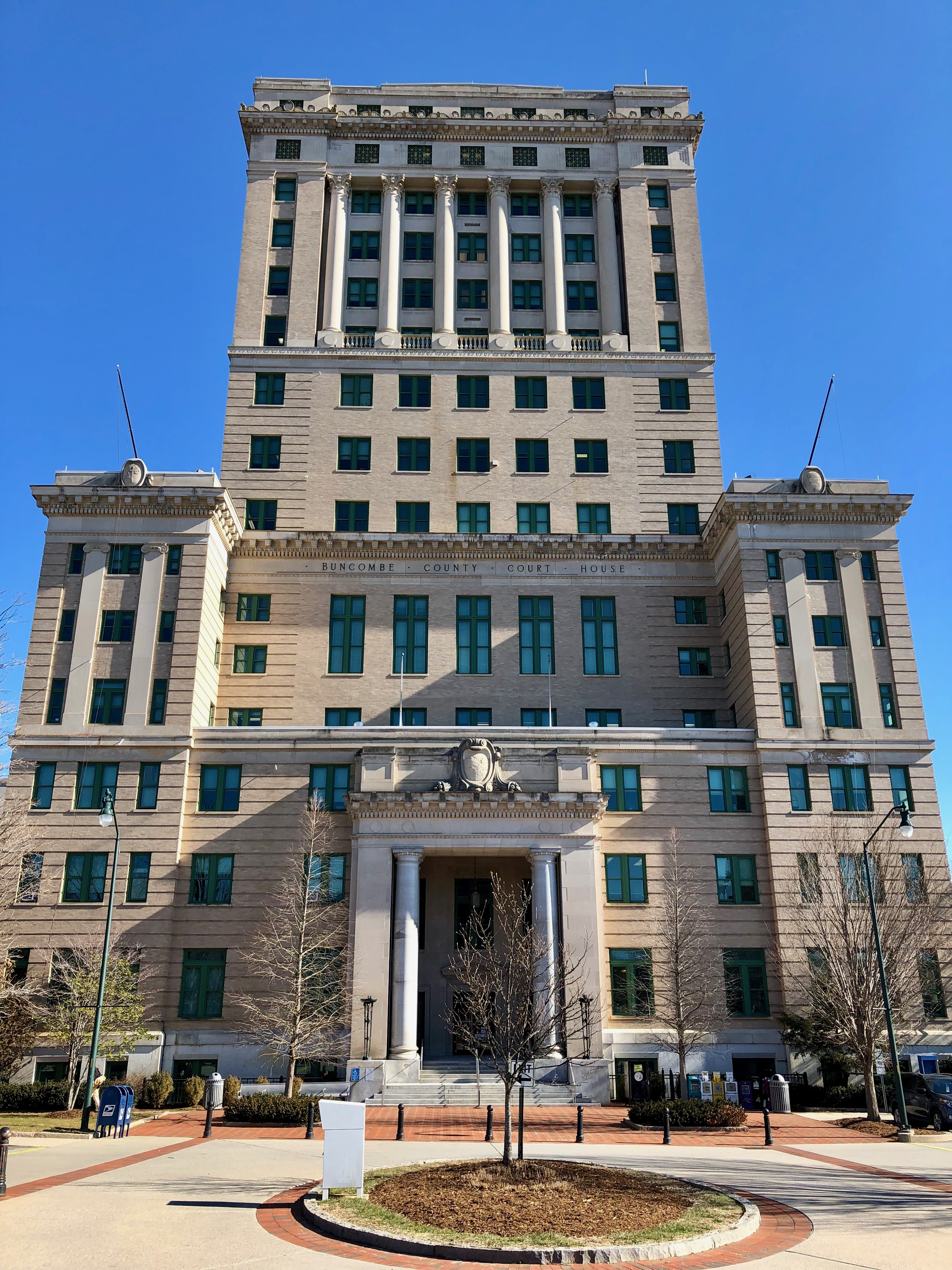
- Buncombe County Courthouse, January 2019

- Location within North Carolina Location within the United States
- Location: College and Davidson Sts., Asheville, North Carolina
- Coordinates: 35°35′45″N 82°32′55″W
- Area: less than one acre
- Built: 1924-1928
- Architect: Milburn, Frank
- Architectural style: Classical Revival, Skyscraper
- MPS: North Carolina County Courthouses TR
- NRHP reference No.: 79001674
- Added to NRHP: May 10, 1979

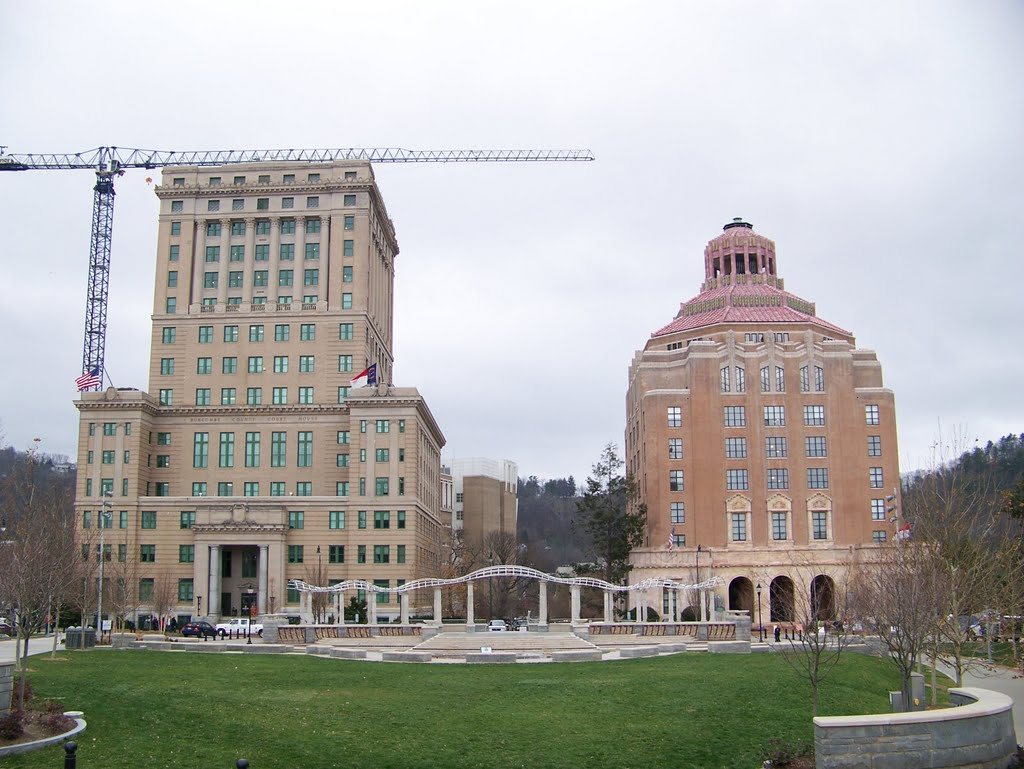
Buncombe County Courthouse & Asheville City Hall, 2012

Buncombe County Courthouse is a historic courthouse building located at Asheville, Buncombe County, North Carolina. It was designed by architect Frank Pierce Milburn and built between 1924 and 1928. It is a 17-story, steel frame skyscraper sheathed in brick and ashlar veneer. It features complex setbacks and an extravagant overlay of Neo-Classical Revival ornament.

It was listed on the National Register of Historic Places in 1979. It is located in the Downtown Asheville Historic District.
