= Asheville, North Carolina =

City in North Carolina, United States

- City
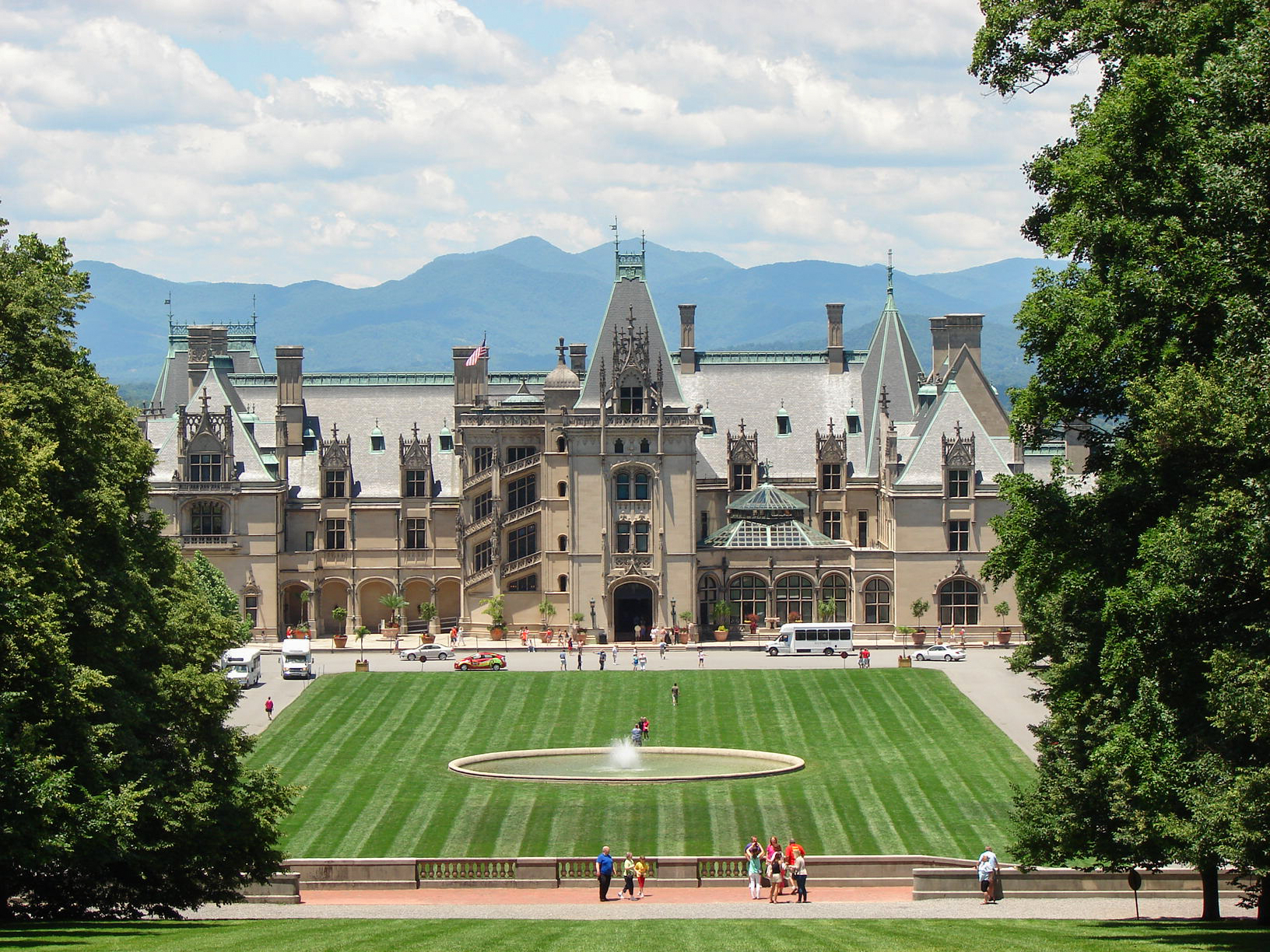
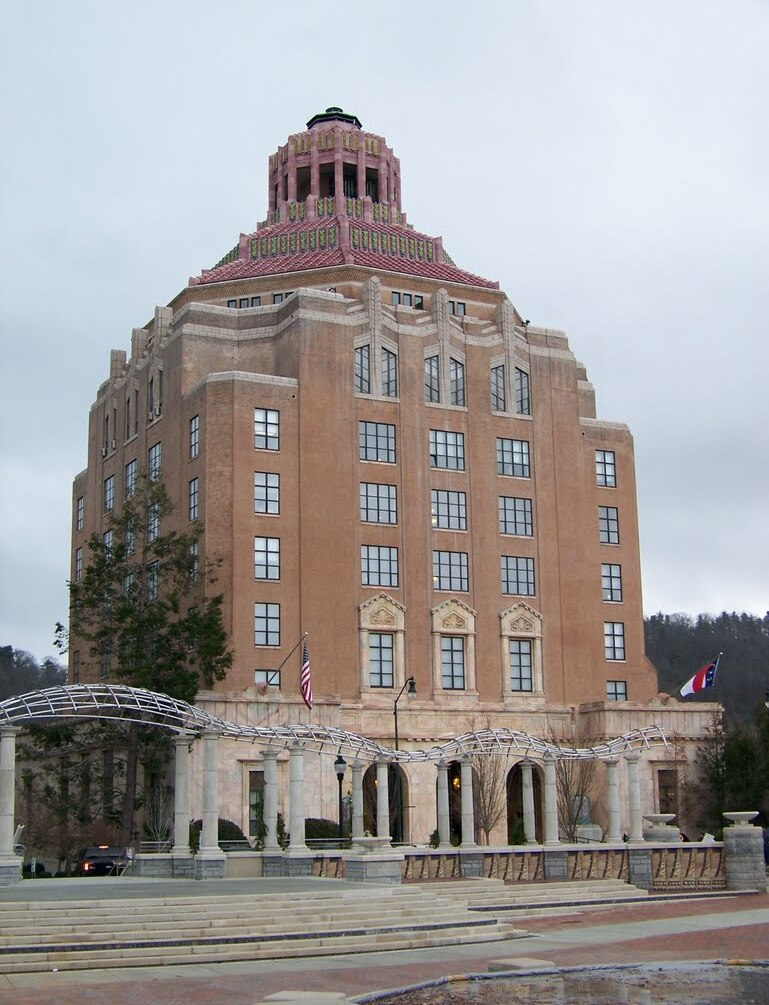
- Downtown Asheville in 2025, looking north Biltmore Estate Asheville City Hall

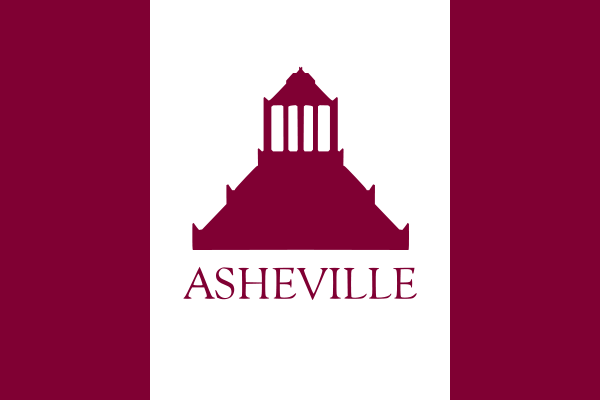
- Flag Seal Logo
- Nicknames: AVL, Land of the Sky
- Motto: "Quality of Service, Quality of Life"
- Interactive map of Asheville, North Carolina
- Location within North Carolina Location within the United States
- Coordinates: 35°35′44″N 82°33′07″W
- Country: United States
- State: North Carolina
- County: Buncombe
- Incorporated: 1797
- Named for: Governor Samuel Ashe

Government
  - Type: Council–manager
  - Body: Asheville City Council
  - Mayor: Esther E. Manheimer (D)
  - Council: Members: S. Antanette Mosley (vice mayor); Kim Roney; Sheneika Smith; Sage Turner; Maggie Ullman; Bo Hess

Area
  - Total: 45.85 sq mi (118.76 km^{2})
  - Land: 45.47 sq mi (117.77 km^{2})
  - Water: 0.39 sq mi (1.00 km^{2}) 0.85%
- Elevation: 2,130 ft (650 m)

Population (2020)
  - Total: 94,589
  - Estimate (2025): 93,523
  - Rank: 11th in North Carolina
  - Density: 2,080.2/sq mi (803.18/km^{2})
  - Urban: 285,776 (US: 141st)
  - Urban density: 1,150/sq mi (443.9/km^{2})
  - Metro: 417,202 (US: 131st)
- Demonym: Ashevillan
- Time zone: UTC−5 (Eastern)
  - Summer (DST): UTC−4 (EDT)
- ZIP Codes: 28801–28806, 28810, 28813–28816
- Area code: 828
- FIPS code: 37-02140
- GNIS feature ID: 1018864
- Website: ashevillenc.gov

Asheville (/ˈæʃ.vɪl/ ASH-vill) is a city in Buncombe County, North Carolina, United States. Located at the confluence of the French Broad and Swannanoa rivers, it is the county seat of Buncombe County. It is the most populous city in Western North Carolina and the state's 11th-most populous city with a population of 94,589 at the 2020 census. The three-county Asheville metropolitan area has an estimated 422,000 residents.

== History ==
=== Origins ===
Before the arrival of the European Colonists, the land where Asheville now exists lay within the boundaries of the Cherokee Nation, which had homelands in modern western North and South Carolina, southeastern Tennessee, and northeastern Georgia. A town at the site of the river confluence was recorded as Guaxule by Spanish explorer Hernando de Soto during his 1540 expedition through this area. His expedition comprised the first European visitors, who carried endemic Eurasian infectious diseases that killed much of the native population.

The Cherokee had traditionally used the area by the confluence for open hunting and meeting grounds. They called it Untokiasdiyi or Tokiyasdi (ᏙᎩᏯᏍᏗ in Cherokee), meaning "Where they race", until the middle of the 19th century.

European Americans began to settle in the area of Asheville in 1784, after the United States gained independence in the American Revolutionary War. In that year, Colonel Samuel Davidson and his family settled in the Swannanoa Valley, redeeming a soldier's land grant from the state of North Carolina made in lieu of pay. Soon after building a log cabin at the bank of Christian Creek, Davidson was lured into the woods and killed by a band of Cherokee hunters resisting white encroachment. Davidson's wife, child, and female slave fled on foot overnight to Davidson's Fort (named after Davidson's father General John Davidson) 16 miles away.

In response to the killing, Davidson's twin brother Major William Davidson and brother-in-law Colonel Daniel Smith formed an expedition to retrieve Samuel Davidson's body and avenge his murder. Months after the expedition, Major Davidson and other members of his extended family returned to the area and settled at the mouth of Bee Tree Creek.

The U.S. Census of 1790 counted 1,000 residents of the area, excluding the Cherokee Native Americans as a separate nation. Buncombe County was officially formed in 1792. In the 1800 US Census, some 107 settlers in the county were enslavers, owning a total of 300 slaves. Total county population was 5,812.

The county seat, named "Morristown" in 1793, was established on a plateau where two Indian trails crossed. In 1797, Morristown was incorporated and renamed "Asheville" after North Carolina Governor Samuel Ashe.

In the 1800s, James McDowell established land for burial of slaves belonging to his and the Smith families in Asheville. His son William Wallace McDowell continued this practice, setting aside about two acres of land for this purpose.

=== Civil War ===
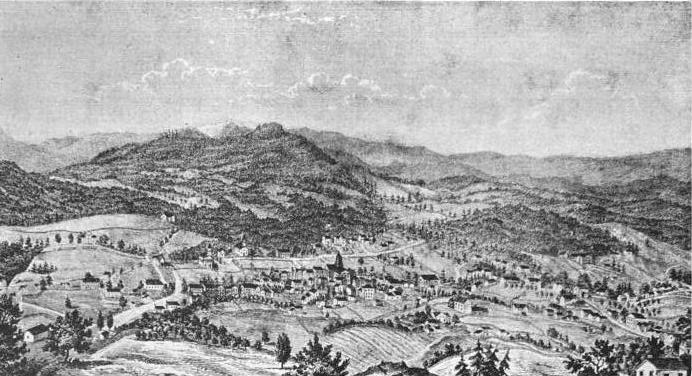
Asheville, 1854

On the eve of the Civil War, James W. Patton, son of an Irish immigrant, was the largest enslaver in the county, and had built a luxurious mansion, known as The Henrietta, in Asheville. Buncombe County had the largest number of prominent enslavers in Western North Carolina, many in the professional class based in Asheville, numbering a total of 293 countywide in 1863.

Asheville, with a population of about 2,500 by 1861, remained relatively untouched by battles of the Civil War. The city contributed companies to the Confederate States Army and to the Union Army. For a time, an Enfield rifle manufacturing facility was located in the town.

The war did not reach Asheville until early April 1865, when the "Battle of Asheville" was fought at the present-day site of the University of North Carolina at Asheville. Union forces withdrew to Tennessee, which they had occupied since 1862. They had encountered resistance in Asheville from a small group of Confederate senior and junior reserves, and recuperating Confederate soldiers in prepared trench lines across the Buncombe Turnpike. The Union force had been ordered to take Asheville only if they could accomplish it without significant losses.

An engagement was fought later that month at Swannanoa Gap, as part of the larger Stoneman's Raid throughout western North Carolina, Virginia, and Tennessee. Union forces retreated in the face of resistance from Brig. Gen. James Green Martin, commander of Confederate troops in western North Carolina. Later, Union forces returned to the area via Howard's Gap and Henderson County. In late April 1865, North Carolina Union troops from the 3rd North Carolina Mounted Infantry, under the overall command of Union Gen. George Stoneman, captured Asheville. After a negotiated departure, the 2,700 troops left town, accompanied by "hundreds of freed slaves".

Later, the federal troops returned and plundered Asheville, burning a number of Confederate supporters' homes in Asheville.

George Avery was among 40 enslaved people known to have traveled with the troops to Tennessee. There he enlisted in the U.S. Colored Troops. He returned to Asheville after being discharged in 1866. After the war, he was hired by his former enslaver William W. McDowell to manage the South Asheville Cemetery, a public place for black burials. This is the oldest and largest black public cemetery in the state. By 1943, when the last burial was conducted, it held remains of an estimated 2,000 people.

=== 1880s ===
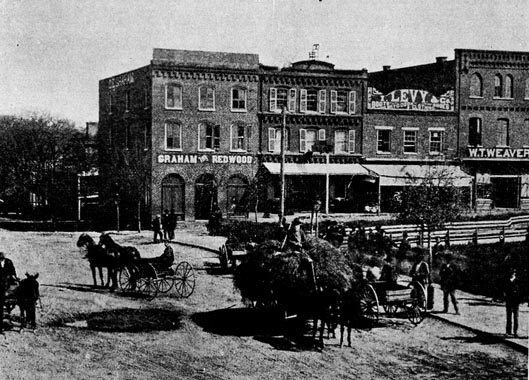
Downtown Asheville, 1888

On October 3, 1880, the Western North Carolina Railroad completed its line from Salisbury to Asheville, the first rail line to reach the city. Almost immediately it was sold and resold to the Richmond and Danville Railroad Company, becoming part of the Southern Railway in 1894. With the completion of the first railway, Asheville developed with steady growth as industrial plants increased in number and size, and new residents built homes. Textile mills were built to process cotton from the region, and other plants were set up to manufacture wood and mica products, foodstuffs, and other commodities.

The 21-mile (34 km) distance between Hendersonville and Asheville of the former Asheville and Spartanburg Railroad was completed in 1886. By that point, the line was operated as part of the Richmond and Danville Railroad until 1894 and controlled by the Southern Railway afterward.

Asheville had the first electric street railway lines in the state of North Carolina, the first of which opened in 1889. These were replaced by buses in 1934.

Three people were lynched in Asheville in the 1880s and 90s: John Humphries (1888), Hezekiah Rankin (1891), and Bob Brackett (1897). The three men were memorialized with historic markers in 2021 through a project launched by the Equal Justice Initiative.

=== 1900s ===
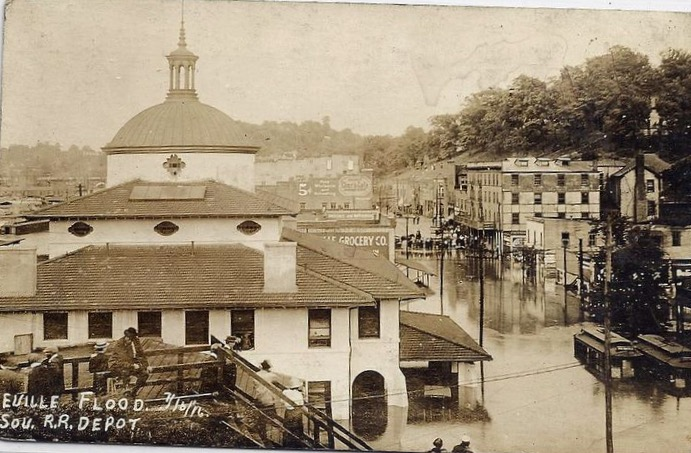
Depot Street in the Great Flood of 1916

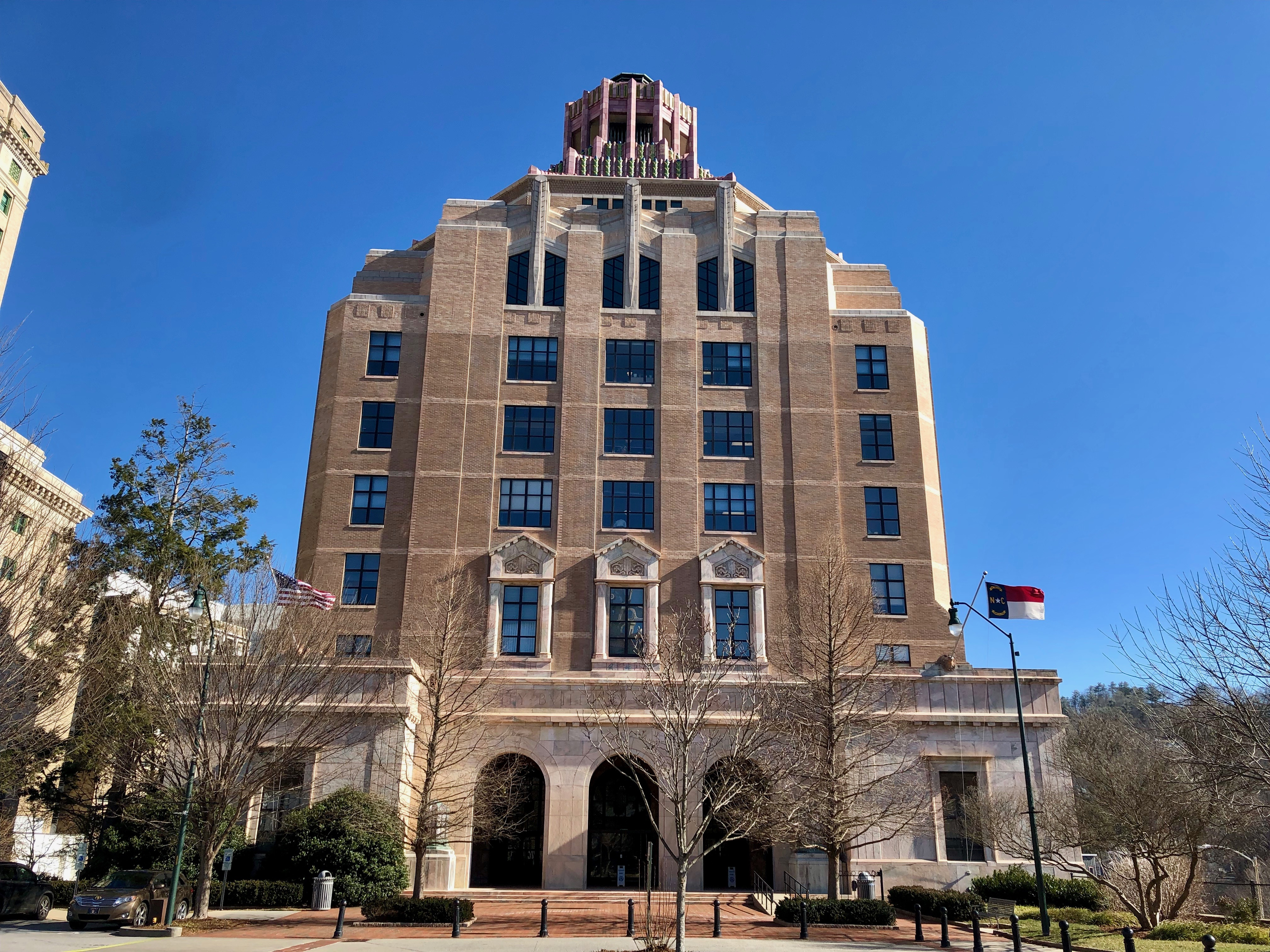
Asheville City Hall, designed by Douglas Ellington, in the Art Deco style of the 1920s

In 1900, Asheville was the third-largest city in the state, behind Wilmington and Charlotte. Asheville prospered in the decades of the 1910s and 1920s. During these years, Rutherford P. Hayes, son of President Rutherford B. Hayes, bought land, and worked with the prominent African-American businessman Edward W. Pearson Sr. to develop his land for residential housing known as the African-American Burton Street Community. Hayes also worked to establish a sanitary district in West Asheville, which became an incorporated town in 1913, and merged with Asheville in 1917.

The Asheville Masonic Temple was constructed in 1913, under the direction of famed architect Richard Sharp Smith, a Freemason. It was the meeting place for local Masons through much of the 20th century.

On July 15–16, 1916, the Asheville area was subject to severe flooding from the remnants of a tropical storm which caused more than $3 million in damage. Areas flooded included part of the Biltmore Estate, and the company that ran it sold some of the property to lower their maintenance costs. This area was later developed as an independent jurisdiction known as Biltmore Forest, which is now one of the wealthiest in the country.

Asheville, North Carolina Southern Depot during the flood of 1916

A city planning document said Asheville had about 28,500 people in 1922, a third of which were black.

The Great Depression hit Asheville quite hard. On November 20, 1930, eight local banks failed. Only Wachovia remained open with infusions of cash from Winston-Salem. Because of the explosive growth of the previous decades, the per capita debt owed by the city (through municipal bonds) was the highest in the nation. By 1929, both the city and Buncombe County had incurred over $56 million in bonded debt to pay for a wide range of municipal and infrastructure improvements, including City Hall, the water system, Beaucatcher Tunnel, and Asheville High School. Rather than default, the city paid those debts over a period of fifty years.

From the start of the depression through the 1980s, economic growth in Asheville was slow. During this time of financial stagnation, most of the buildings in the downtown district remained unaltered. As a result, Asheville has one of the most impressive, comprehensive collections of Art Deco architecture in the United States.

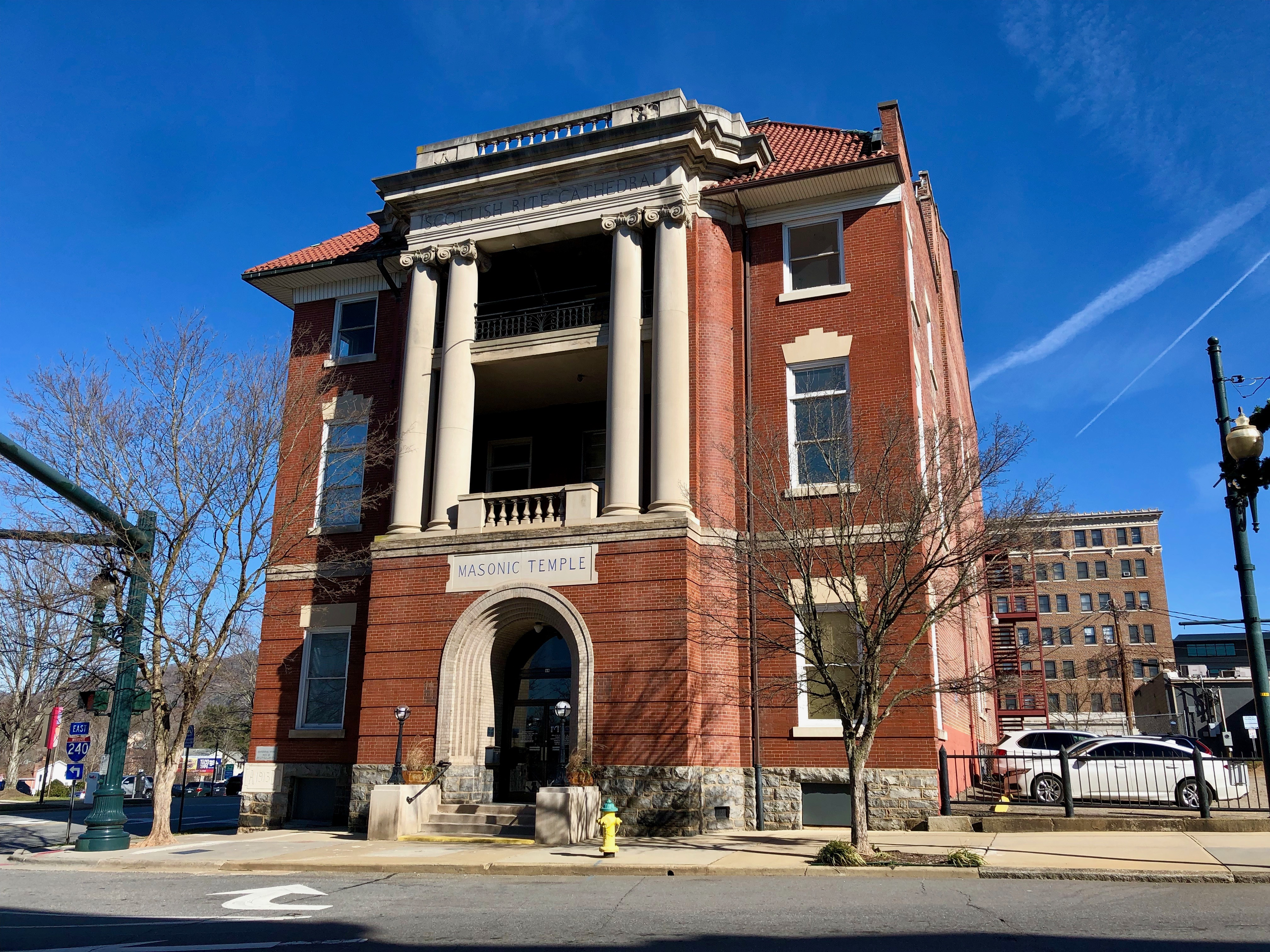
Asheville Masonic Temple Scottish Rite Cathedral

In 1959, the City Council purchased property partially located in neighboring Henderson County for the development of Asheville Regional Airport. The North Carolina General Assembly passed a bill to redraw the boundaries of Buncombe and Henderson counties to include the proposed airport property entirely in Buncombe, allowing Asheville to annex the complete site.

The last passenger train to serve Asheville, a coach-only remnant of the Southern Railway's Carolina Special, made its last run on December 5, 1968.

From the 1950s to the 1970s, urban renewal displaced much of Asheville's African-American population. 1,300 buildings were lost in the 425-acre East Riverside project. 1,250 families, more than half the city's black population, were forced to move. Asheville's neighborhoods of Montford and Kenilworth, now mostly white, used to have a majority of black home owners. The city's black population has dropped significantly since 1922, declining from a third to a tenth a hundred years later.

Since the late 20th century, there has been an effort to maintain and preserve the South Asheville Cemetery, in the Kenilworth neighborhood. It is the largest public black cemetery in the state, holding about 2000 burials, dating from the early 1800s and slavery years, to 1943. Fewer than 100 of the graves are marked by tombstones.

=== 2000s to present ===
In 2003, Centennial Olympic Park bomber Eric Robert Rudolph was transported to Asheville from Murphy, North Carolina, for arraignment in federal court.

In September 2004, remnants of Hurricanes Frances and Ivan caused major flooding in Asheville, particularly at Biltmore Village. In 2006, the Asheville Zombie Walk was organized for the first time, starting a tradition that lasted until 2016.

In July 2020, the Asheville City Council voted to provide reparations to Black residents for the city's "historic role in slavery, discrimination and denial of basic liberties". The resolution was unanimously passed, and Asheville committed to "make investments in areas where Black residents face disparities". Also in 2020, efforts were made to remove or change several monuments in the city that celebrated the Confederate States of America or slave owners. In June 2021, Asheville Mayor Esther Manheimer was one of 11 U.S. mayors to form Mayors Organized for Reparations and Equity (MORE), a coalition of municipal leaders dedicated to starting pilot reparations programs in their cities.

==== Hurricane Helene ====
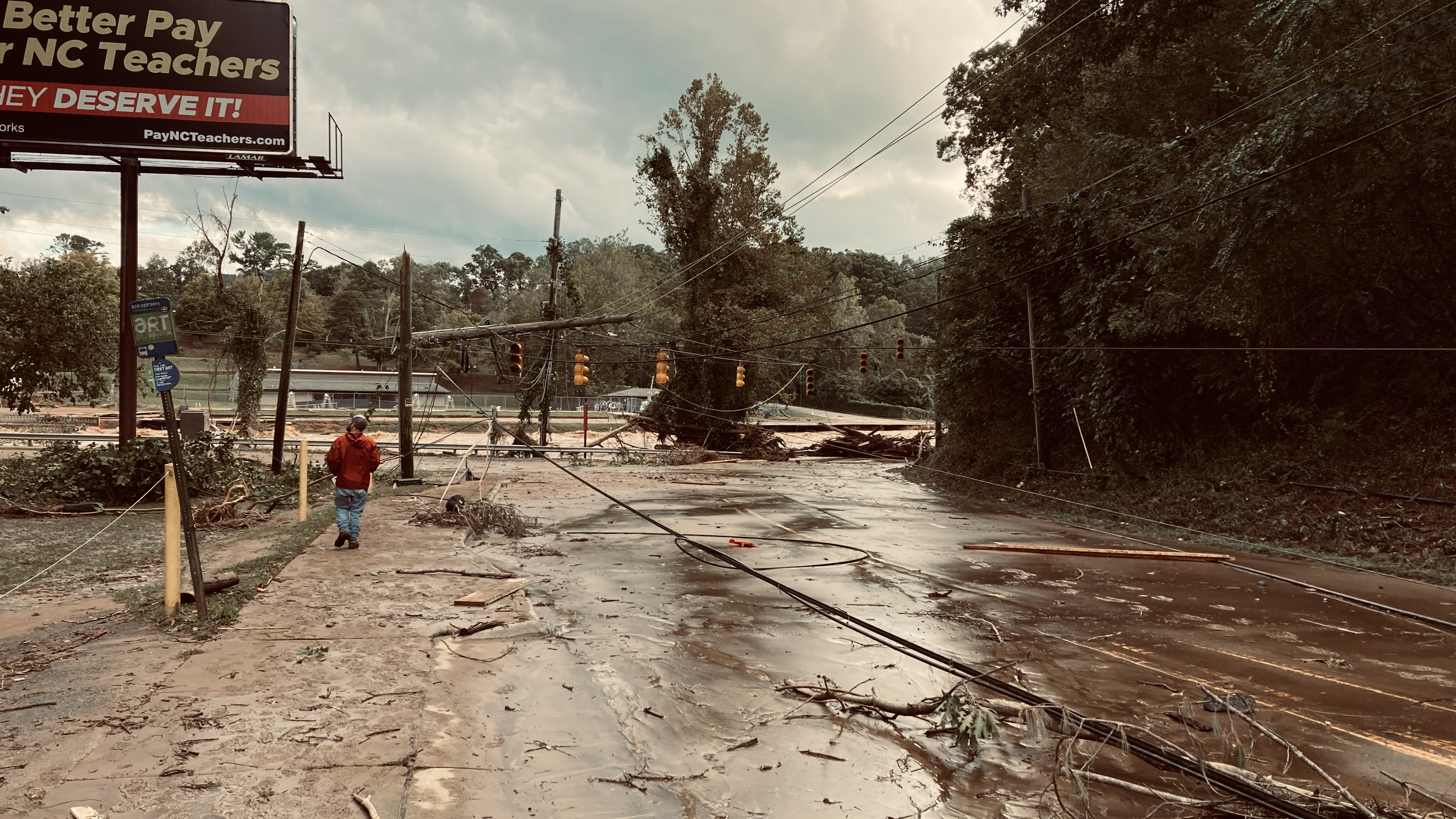
Damage from Hurricane Helene

In September 2024, Hurricane Helene caused catastrophic, record-breaking flooding of the French Broad and Swannanoa rivers, devastating Asheville and surrounding areas of Western North Carolina. The full extent of the damage was difficult to gauge in the immediate aftermath due to loss of critical infrastructure, including electrical, cellular telephone, and other communications services. Early reports indicated hundreds of downed trees, damaged homes, and blocked local roads. The municipal water system was catastrophically damaged, leaving most of Asheville without running water. Buildings and bridges were washed away and landslides cut off access to several major interstates including I-40 and I-26, leaving the area largely isolated from the outside.

In Helene's aftermath, Buncombe County lost over 3,000 jobs, the majority of which were in accommodation and food services. A representative for the North Carolina Department of Commerce said federal funding made available did not seem like it would meet the full need in Western North Carolina.

== Geography ==
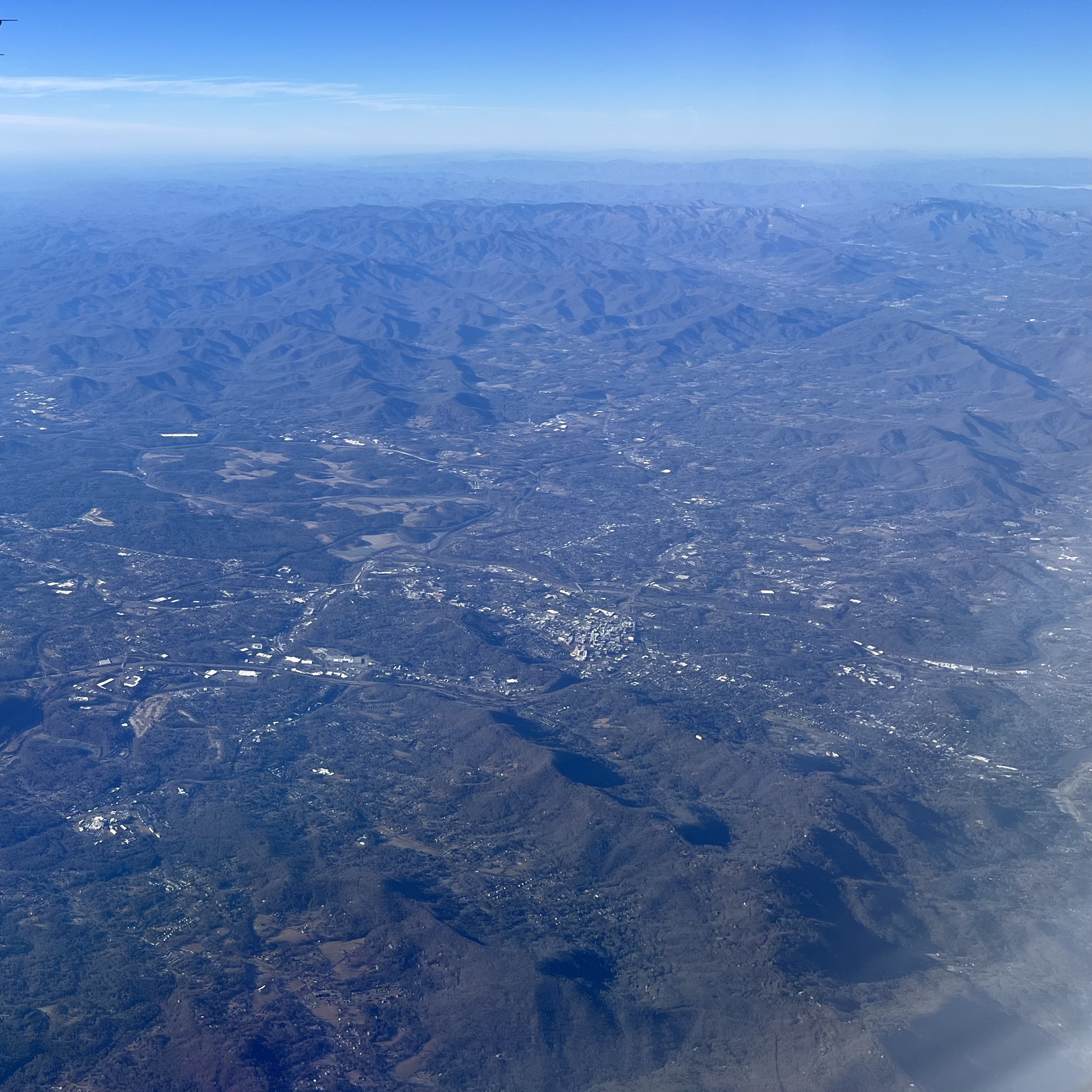
Aerial view in 2024

Asheville is located in the Blue Ridge Mountains at the confluence of the Swannanoa River and the French Broad River. According to the United States Census Bureau, the city has a total area of 45.86 square miles (118.8 km^{2}), of which 45.47 square miles (117.8 km^{2}) is land and 0.39 square miles (1.0 km^{2}) (0.85%) is water.

Asheville is west of Hickory, northwest of Charlotte, and southwest of Winston-Salem.

=== Climate ===
Asheville features a climate that borders between a humid subtropical climate (Köppen: Cfa) and an oceanic climate (Trewartha: Do) with noticeably cooler temperatures than the rest of the Piedmont region of the Southeast due to the higher elevation; it is part of USDA Hardiness zone 7a. The area's summers in particular, though warm, are not as hot as summers in cities farther east in the state, as the July daily average temperature is 73.8 °F (23.2 °C) and there is an average of only 9.4 afternoons with 90 °F (32.2 °C)+ highs annually; (Note: The record number of annual 90 °F or 32.2 °C readings is 32 in 1952, which would be lower than average in most cities in the southeast U.S.) the last time a calendar year passed without a single 90 °F (32.2 °C) reading was as recently as 2009. Moreover, warm mornings where the low remains at or above 70 °F or 21.1 °C are much less common than 90 °F or 32.2 °C afternoons. Winters are cool, with a January daily average of 37.1 °F (2.8 °C) and highs remaining at or below freezing on 5.5 afternoons.

Official record temperatures range from −16 °F (−26.7 °C) on January 21, 1985 to 100 °F (37.8 °C) on August 21, 1983; the record cold daily maximum is 4 °F or −15.6 °C on February 4, 1895, while, conversely, the record warm daily minimum is 77 °F or 25 °C on July 17, 1887. Readings as low as 0 °F (−17.8 °C) or as high as 95 °F (35 °C) rarely occur, the last occurrences being January 7, 2014 and July 1, 2012, respectively. The average window for freezing temperatures is October 17 to April 18, allowing a growing season of 181 days.

Asheville is located in the Appalachian temperate rainforest and precipitation is relatively well spread, though the summer months are slightly wetter, and averages 49.6 in (1,260 mm) annually, but has historically ranged from 22.79 in (579 mm) in 1925 to 79.48 in (2,019 mm) in 2018. Snowfall is sporadic, averaging 10.3 inches or 0.26 metres per winter season, but actual seasonal accumulation varies considerably from one winter to the next; accumulation has ranged from trace amounts in 2011–12 to 48.2 inches or 1.2 metres in 1968–69. Freezing rain often occurs, accompanied by significant disruption. Hail is not uncommon during the spring and summer, accompanied by intense severe thunderstorms but the number of days with thunderstorms varies dramatically from year to year ranging from as few as 15 days in 2008 to as many as 44 in 2018. The month that usually experiences the most thunderstorms in Asheville is in July but number of days with thunderstorms in July has ranged from as many as 18 days in 2016 to as few as two days in 2008.

Climate data for Asheville Regional Airport, North Carolina (1991–2020 normals, (Note: Mean monthly maxima and minima (i.e. the expected highest and lowest temperature readings at any point during the year or given month) calculated based on data at said location from 1991 to 2020.) extremes 1876–present) (Note: Official precipitation records for Asheville were kept at Aston Park from March 1869 to July 1876, various locations in the city from August 1876 to August 1964, and at Asheville Regional Airport since September 1964. Snow and temperature records began December 18, 1869, and November 1, 1876, respectively. For more information, see ThreadEx.)
Month	Jan	Feb	Mar	Apr	May	Jun	Jul	Aug	Sep	Oct	Nov	Dec	Year
Record high °F (°C)	80 (27)	80 (27)	87 (31)	90 (32)	93 (34)	98 (37)	99 (37)	100 (38)	95 (35)	91 (33)	83 (28)	81 (27)	100 (38)
Mean maximum °F (°C)	67.0 (19.4)	69.3 (20.7)	76.7 (24.8)	82.5 (28.1)	86.2 (30.1)	89.4 (31.9)	91.0 (32.8)	90.1 (32.3)	86.9 (30.5)	81.3 (27.4)	73.8 (23.2)	66.9 (19.4)	92.0 (33.3)
Mean daily maximum °F (°C)	48.9 (9.4)	52.9 (11.6)	59.8 (15.4)	69.4 (20.8)	76.3 (24.6)	82.5 (28.1)	85.3 (29.6)	84.0 (28.9)	78.7 (25.9)	69.6 (20.9)	59.5 (15.3)	51.5 (10.8)	68.2 (20.1)
Daily mean °F (°C)	38.7 (3.7)	42.1 (5.6)	48.4 (9.1)	57.0 (13.9)	64.8 (18.2)	71.8 (22.1)	75.1 (23.9)	74.0 (23.3)	68.3 (20.2)	57.9 (14.4)	47.8 (8.8)	41.4 (5.2)	57.3 (14.1)
Mean daily minimum °F (°C)	28.6 (−1.9)	31.2 (−0.4)	37.0 (2.8)	44.6 (7.0)	53.2 (11.8)	61.1 (16.2)	64.9 (18.3)	64.0 (17.8)	57.9 (14.4)	46.2 (7.9)	36.1 (2.3)	31.3 (−0.4)	46.3 (7.9)
Mean minimum °F (°C)	9.9 (−12.3)	15.5 (−9.2)	20.3 (−6.5)	29.3 (−1.5)	37.7 (3.2)	49.4 (9.7)	56.5 (13.6)	54.5 (12.5)	44.2 (6.8)	30.0 (−1.1)	21.6 (−5.8)	16.3 (−8.7)	7.6 (−13.6)
Record low °F (°C)	−16 (−27)	−9 (−23)	2 (−17)	20 (−7)	28 (−2)	35 (2)	44 (7)	42 (6)	30 (−1)	20 (−7)	1 (−17)	−7 (−22)	−16 (−27)
Average precipitation inches (mm)	4.13 (105)	3.46 (88)	3.80 (97)	4.17 (106)	4.13 (105)	4.79 (122)	4.67 (119)	5.04 (128)	4.13 (105)	3.37 (86)	3.72 (94)	4.18 (106)	49.59 (1,260)
Average snowfall inches (cm)	3.6 (9.1)	1.9 (4.8)	1.9 (4.8)	0.2 (0.51)	0.0 (0.0)	0.0 (0.0)	0.0 (0.0)	0.0 (0.0)	0.0 (0.0)	0.0 (0.0)	0.2 (0.51)	2.5 (6.4)	10.3 (26)
Average precipitation days (≥ 0.01 in)	10.5	9.8	11.9	10.6	11.5	13.4	13.9	13.1	9.2	7.8	8.8	10.0	130.5
Average snowy days (≥ 0.1 in)	1.6	1.5	1.0	0.2	0.0	0.0	0.0	0.0	0.0	0.0	0.2	1.1	5.6
Average relative humidity (%)	72.6	69.8	68.4	66.2	75.3	78.6	81.6	83.5	84.1	78.4	74.8	74.1	75.7
Average dew point °F (°C)	26.1 (−3.3)	27.1 (−2.7)	34.7 (1.5)	41.7 (5.4)	52.9 (11.6)	61.0 (16.1)	65.3 (18.5)	64.9 (18.3)	59.4 (15.2)	46.8 (8.2)	37.6 (3.1)	30.4 (−0.9)	45.7 (7.6)
Mean monthly sunshine hours	175.9	181.2	223.5	252.3	264.1	267.0	257.5	227.8	207.5	219.6	178.8	167.2	2,622.4
Percentage possible sunshine	56	59	60	64	61	61	58	55	56	63	58	55	59
Source: NOAA (relative humidity and dew point 1964–1990, sun 1961–1990)

=== Neighborhoods ===
- North – includes the neighborhoods of Albemarle Park, Beaverdam, Chestnut Hills, Colonial Heights, Five Points, Grove Park, Hillcrest, Kimberly, Klondyke, Montford, and Norwood Park. Chestnut Hill, Grove Park, Lakeview Park, Montford, and Norwood Park neighborhoods are listed in the National Register of Historic Places. Montford and Albemarle Park have been named local historic districts by the Asheville City Council.
- East – includes the neighborhoods of Kenilworth, Beverly Hills, Chunn's Cove, Haw Creek, Oakley, Oteen, Reynolds, Riceville, and Town Mountain.
- West – includes the neighborhoods of Camelot, Wilshire Park, Bear Creek, Deaverview Park, Emma, East-West Asheville, Hi-Alta Park, Lucerne Park, Malvern Hills, Sulphur Springs, Burton Street, Haywood Road, and Pisgah View.
- South – includes the neighborhoods of Ballantree, Biltmore Village, Biltmore Park, Oak Forest, Royal Pines, Shiloh, and Skyland. Biltmore Village has been named a local historic district by the Asheville City Council.

=== Architecture ===
Notable architecture in Asheville includes its Art Deco Asheville City Hall, and other unique buildings in the downtown area, such as the Battery Park Hotel, the original of which was 475 feet long with numerous dormers and chimneys; the Neo-Gothic Jackson Building, the first skyscraper on Pack Square; Grove Arcade, one of America's first indoor shopping malls; and the Basilica of St. Lawrence. The S&W Cafeteria Building is also a fine example of Art Deco architecture in Asheville. The Grove Park Inn is an important example of architecture and design of the Arts and Crafts movement.

Asheville's recovery from the Depression was slow and arduous. Because of the financial stagnation, there was little new construction and much of the downtown district remained unaltered.

The Montford Area Historic District and other central areas are considered historic districts and include Victorian houses. Biltmore Village, located at the entrance to the famous Biltmore Estate, showcases unique architectural features. It was here that workers stayed during the construction of the estate. The YMI Cultural Center, founded in 1892 by George Vanderbilt in the heart of downtown, is one of the nation's oldest African-American cultural centers.

=== Metropolitan/combined statistical area ===
Asheville is the largest city in the Asheville, NC Metropolitan Statistical Area, as well as the Asheville-Waynesville-Brevard, NC Combined Statistical Area, which includes Buncombe, Haywood, Henderson, Madison, and Transylvania counties, which had a combined population of 513,720 in 2023, as estimated by the United States Census Bureau.

== Demographics ==
Historical population
Census	Pop.	Note	%±
1800	38		—
1850	502		—
1870	1,400		—
1880	2,616		86.9%
1890	10,235		291.2%
1900	14,694		43.6%
1910	18,762		27.7%
1920	28,504		51.9%
1930	50,193		76.1%
1940	51,310		2.2%
1950	53,000		3.3%
1960	60,192		13.6%
1970	57,929		−3.8%
1980	54,022		−6.7%
1990	61,607		14.0%
2000	68,889		11.8%
2010	83,393		21.1%
2020	94,589		13.4%
2025 (est.)	93,523	▼	−1.1%
U.S. Decennial Census

Asheville first appeared in the 1800 U S. Census with "Ashville" as the spelling. Only 38 inhabitants were recorded.

Asheville did not appear again until the 1850 U.S. Census with "Ashville" once again as the spelling. The population recorded was 502. Asheville did not report separately in 1860.

Asheville is the larger principal city of the Asheville-Waynesville-Brevard, NC Combined Statistical Area that includes the Asheville, NC Metropolitan Statistical Area (Buncombe, Haywood, Henderson, and Madison counties) and the Brevard, NC Micropolitan Statistical Area (Transylvania County), which had a combined population of 469,015 at the 2020 census.

Asheville's East End/Valley Street stands as the oldest and most culturally significant black community in the city. Between this neighborhood and downtown is The Block, which was the black business district. The Block includes the YMI Cultural Center, which began in 1893 as the Young Men's Institute. In 2025, the YMI completed a $6.5 million renovation.

=== Racial and ethnic composition ===
Asheville, North Carolina – racial and ethnic composition Note: the US Census treats Hispanic/Latino as an ethnic category. This table excludes Latinos from the racial categories and assigns them to a separate category. Hispanics/Latinos may be of any race.
Race / ethnicity (NH = non-Hispanic)	Pop 2000	Pop 2010	Pop 2020	% 2000	% 2010	% 2020
White alone (NH)	52,340	63,508	70,252	75.98%	76.16%	74.27%
Black or African American alone (NH)	12,054	11,024	9,752	17.50%	13.22%	10.31%
Native American or Alaska Native alone (NH)	227	217	200	0.33%	0.26%	0.21%
Asian alone (NH)	630	1,130	1,504	0.91%	1.36%	1.59%
Native Hawaiian or Pacific Islander alone (NH)	39	123	255	0.06%	0.15%	0.27%
Other race alone (NH)	108	160	654	0.16%	0.19%	0.69%
Mixed-race or multiracial (NH)	902	1,776	4,315	1.31%	2.13%	4.56%
Hispanic or Latino (any race)	2,589	5,455	7,657	3.67%	6.54%	8.10%
Total	68,889	83,393	94,589	100.00%	100.00%	100.00%

=== 2020 census ===
As of the 2020 census, Asheville had a population of 94,589 in 43,216 households and 18,902 families. The median age was 39.4 years. 17.1% of residents were under the age of 18 and 19.4% of residents were 65 years of age or older. For every 100 females there were 89.8 males, and for every 100 females age 18 and over there were 87.0 males age 18 and over.

100.0% of residents lived in urban areas, while 0.0% lived in rural areas.

There were 43,216 households in Asheville, of which 21.5% had children under the age of 18 living in them. Of all households, 33.1% were married-couple households, 22.0% were households with a male householder and no spouse or partner present, and 35.4% were households with a female householder and no spouse or partner present. About 38.2% of all households were made up of individuals and 14.7% had someone living alone who was 65 years of age or older.

There were 47,606 housing units, of which 9.2% were vacant. The homeowner vacancy rate was 1.5% and the rental vacancy rate was 6.4%.

Racial composition as of the 2020 census
Race	Number	Percent
White	71,669	75.8%
Black or African American	9,938	10.5%
American Indian and Alaska Native	357	0.4%
Asian	1,512	1.6%
Native Hawaiian and Other Pacific Islander	268	0.3%
Some other race	3,917	4.1%
Two or more races	6,928	7.3%
Hispanic or Latino (of any race)	7,657	8.1%

=== 2000 census ===
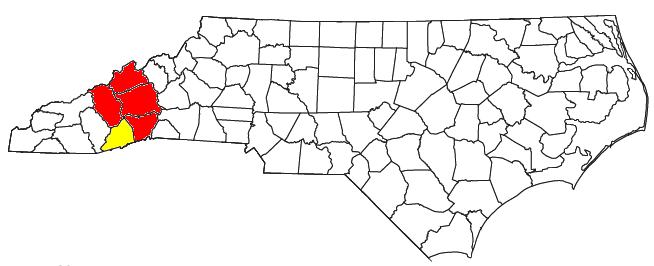
Location of the Asheville-Brevard CSA and its components: Asheville Metropolitan Statistical Area Brevard Micropolitan Statistical Area

At the 2000 census, there were 68,889 people, 30,690 households and 16,726 families residing in the city. The population density was 1,683.4 inhabitants per square mile (650.0/km^{2}). There were 33,567 housing units at an average density of 820.3 per square mile (316.7/km^{2}). The racial composition of the city was: 77.95% White, 17.61% Black or African American, 3.76% Hispanic or Latino American, 0.92% Asian American, 0.35% Native American, 0.06% Native Hawaiian or Other Pacific Islander, 1.53% some other race, and 1.58% two or more races.

There were 30,690 households, of which 22.2% had children under the age of 18 living with them, 38.1% were married couples living together, 13.0% had a female householder with no husband present, and 45.5% were non-families. 36.8% of all households were made up of individuals, and 13.8% had someone living alone who was 65 years of age or older. The average household size was 2.14 and the average family size was 2.81.

Age distribution was 19.6% under the age of 18, 10.3% from 18 to 24, 28.7% from 25 to 44, 23.1% from 45 to 64, and 18.3% who were 65 years of age or older. The median age was 39 years. For every 100 females, there were 87.8 males. For every 100 females age 18 and over, there were 84.9 males.

The median household income was $32,772, and the median family income was $44,029. Males had a median income of $30,463, and $23,488 for females. The per capita income for the city was $20,024. About 13% of families and 19% of the population were below the poverty line, including 24.9% of those under age 18 and 10.1% of those age 65 or over.

=== Religion ===
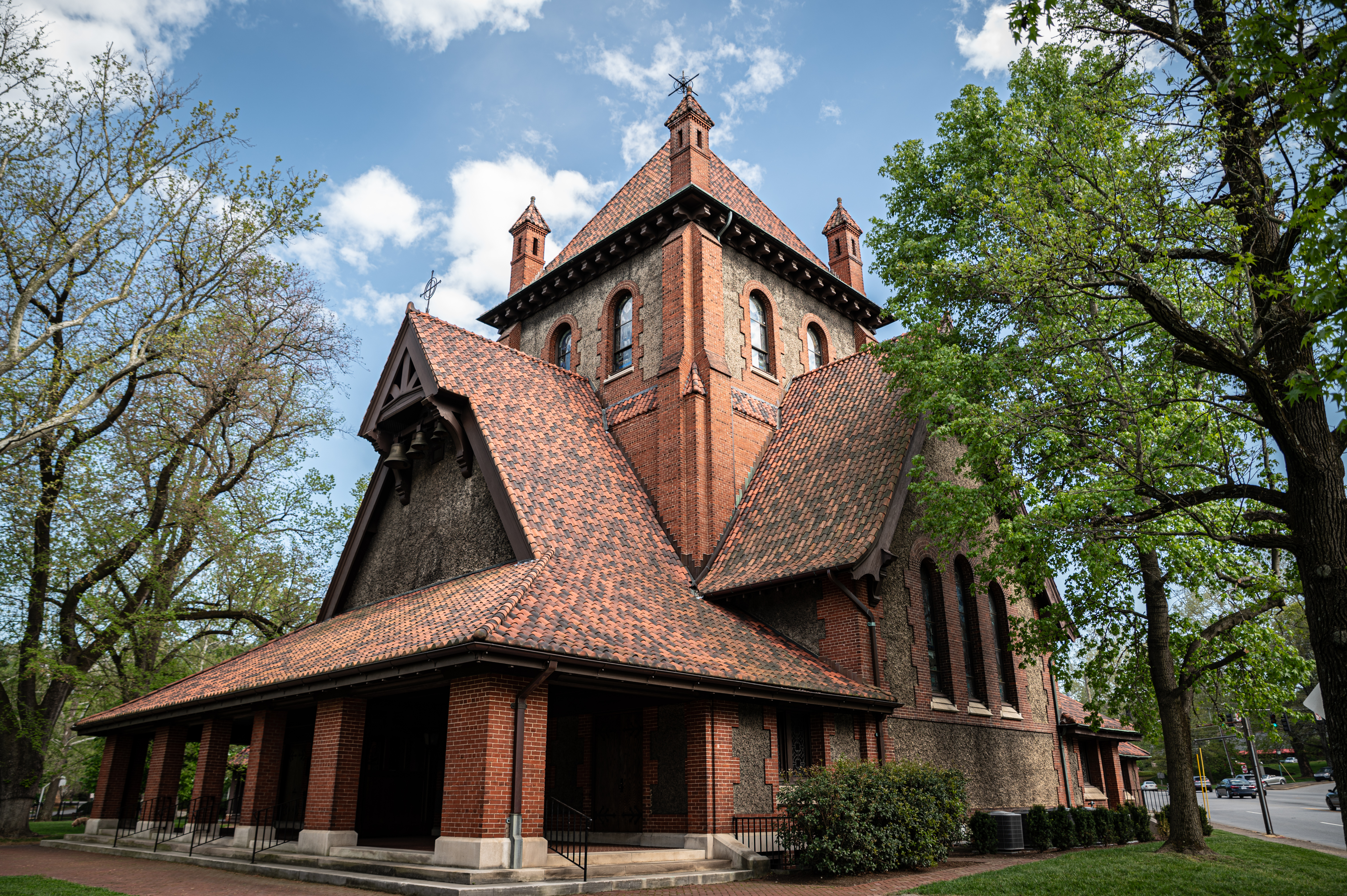
Cathedral of All Souls in Asheville

There are a number of Baptist churches, Roman Catholic, Methodist, Lutheran, Presbyterian, and Churches of Christ, as well as a few non-Christian places of worship, such as Urban Dharma, a Tibetan Buddhist center of the Drikung Kagyu school. Asheville is the headquarters of the Episcopal Diocese of Western North Carolina, which is seated at the Cathedral of All Souls. Asheville is an important city for North Carolinian Catholics, who make pilgrimages to the Basilica of St. Lawrence. There are several historical churches located throughout the city, including the First Baptist Church of Asheville.

Asheville is also home to a number of atheist, humanist, and ethical culture organizations.

== Economy ==
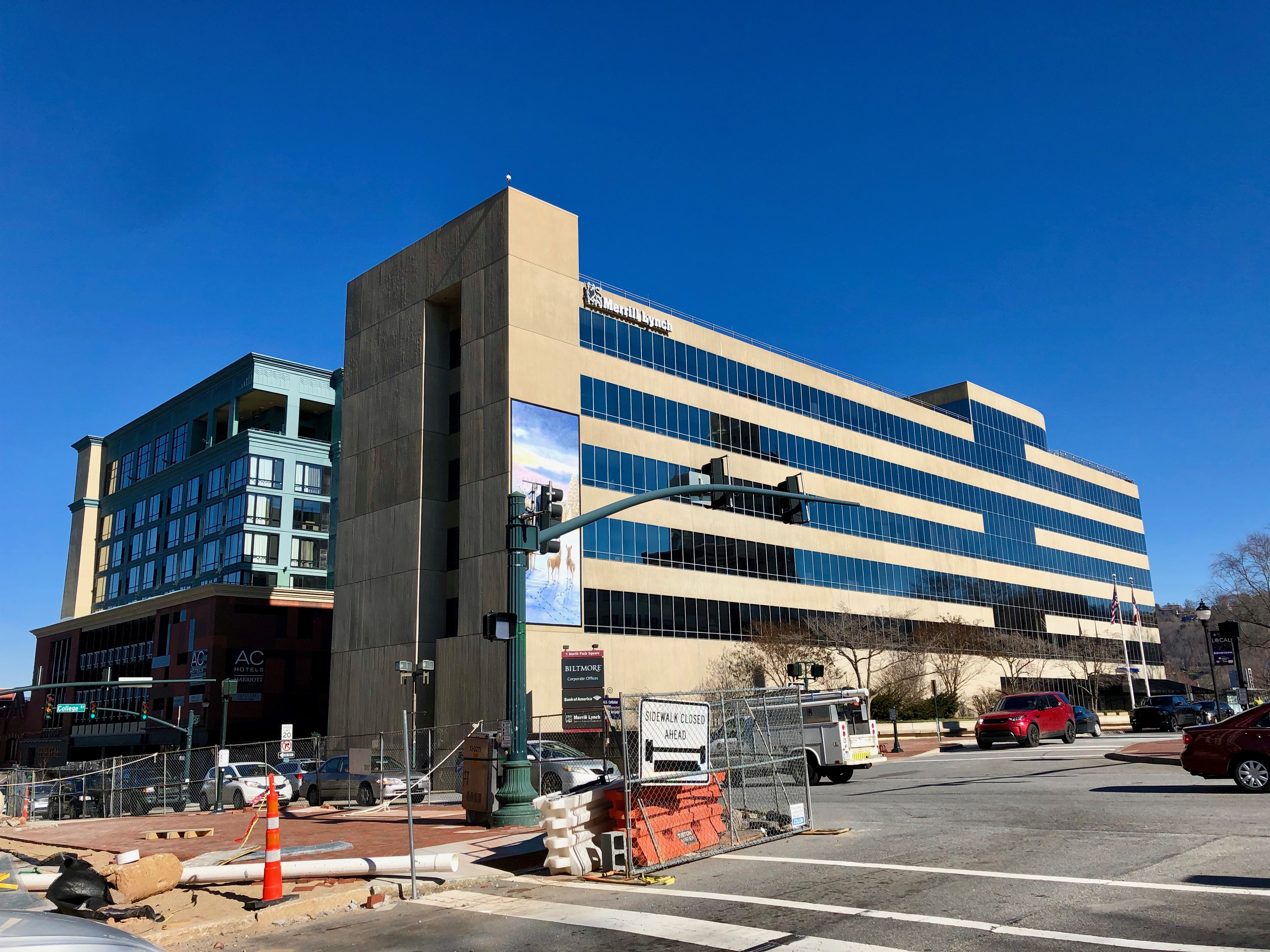
The Merrill Lynch building in downtown Asheville, designed by I.M. Pei

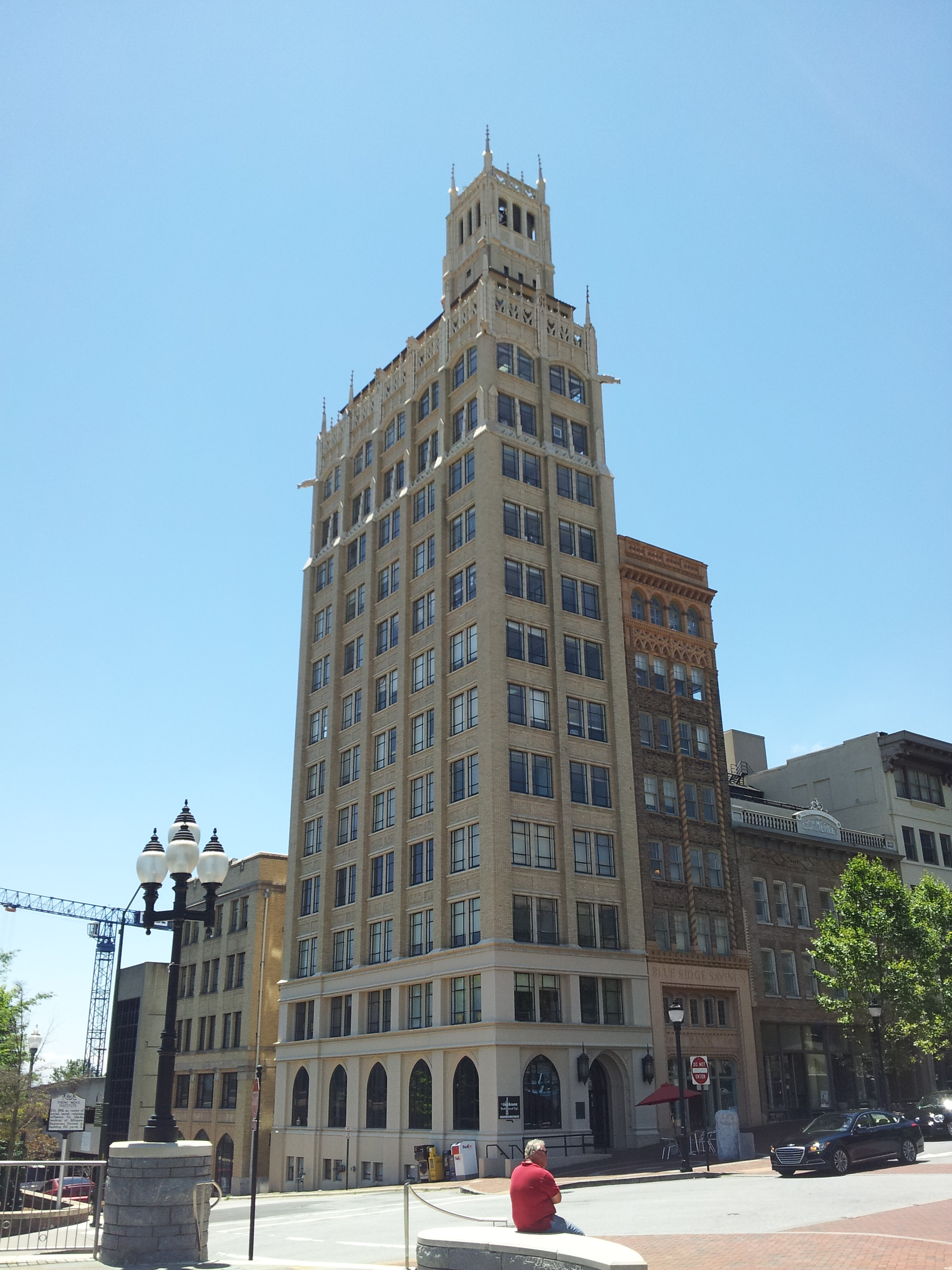
The Jackson Building, the first skyscraper in Asheville

Major corporations headquartered in the Asheville area include HomeTrust Bancshares, Ingles, Earth Fare, The Biltmore Company, Moog Music and the eastern headquarters for Sierra Nevada Brewing Company and New Belgium Brewing Company. Creative industries (arts and culture, inclusive of historic sites such as the Biltmore Estate) also play significant roles in Asheville's tourism-driven economy, with 13,560 people employed in creative industry roles as of 2019, according to the Asheville Area Arts Council. These industries were significantly impacted by COVID-19 in 2020 and Hurricane Helene in 2024.

=== Largest employers ===
According to the city's 2009 Comprehensive Annual Financial Report, the largest employers in the city are:

#	Employer	# of employees
1	Mission Health System	3,000+
2	Buncombe County Schools System	3,000+
3	Ingles Markets, Inc.	3,000+
4	The Biltmore Company	2,000+
5	State of North Carolina	1,000+
6	Buncombe County	1,000+
7	Asheville VA Medical Center	1,000+
8	City of Asheville	1,000+
9	Wal-Mart	1,000+
10	Asheville–Buncombe Technical Community College	1,000+
11	Eaton	1,000+
12	Grove Park Inn	500–999
13	Asheville City Schools	500–999
14	Community CarePartners	500–999
15	United States Postal Service	500–999
16	BorgWarner Turbo Systems	500–999
17	Thermo Fisher Scientific	500–999
18	Arvato Digital Services	500–999
19	Employment Control	500–999
20	Volvo Construction Equipment (now closed)	500–999

=== Sustainability and environmental initiatives ===
The city of Asheville is home to a Duke Energy Progress coal power plant near Lake Julian. This power plant is designated as having Coal Combustion Residue Surface Impoundments with a High Hazard Potential by the EPA. In 2012 a Duke University study found high levels of arsenic and other toxins in North Carolina lakes and rivers downstream from the Asheville power plants coal ash ponds. Samples collected from coal ash waste flowing from the ponds at the Duke Energy Progress plant to the French Broad River in Buncombe County contained arsenic levels more than four times higher than the EPA drinking water standard, and levels of selenium 17 times higher than the agency's standard for aquatic life. In March 2013 the State of North Carolina sued Duke Energy Progress in order to address similar environmental compliance issues. In July 2013 Duke Energy Corp. and North Carolina environmental regulators proposed a settlement in the lawsuit that stated coal ash threatened Asheville's water supply. The settlement called for Duke to assess the sources and extent of contamination at the Riverbend power plant in Asheville. Duke was to be fined $99,100. However, following the coal ash spill in Eden, North Carolina, the North Carolina DENR cancelled all previous settlements with Duke Energy.

The city of Asheville claims a clear focus on sustainability and the development of a green economy. For Asheville, this goal is defined in their Sustainability Management Plan as: "Making decisions that balance the values of environmental stewardship, social responsibility and economic vitality to meet our present needs without compromising the ability of future generations to meet their needs." As part of the Zero Waste AVL initiative, which began in 2012, each resident receives "Big Blue", a rolling cart in which they can put all of their materials unsorted. Residents can recycle a great variety of materials and "in this first year of the program 6.30% of waste was diverted from the landfill for recycling."

The Asheville City Council's goal is to reduce the overall carbon footprint 80% by 2030. This means 4% or more reduction per year. In 2009 the reduction was made when the "City installed over 3,000 LED street lights, managed its water system under ISO 14001 standards for environmental management, improved the infrastructure and management of many of its buildings, and switched many employees to a 4-day work week (which saves emissions from commuting)." Asheville is recognized by the Green Restaurant Association as the first city in the U.S. to be a Green Dining Destination (significant density of green restaurants).

== Arts and culture ==
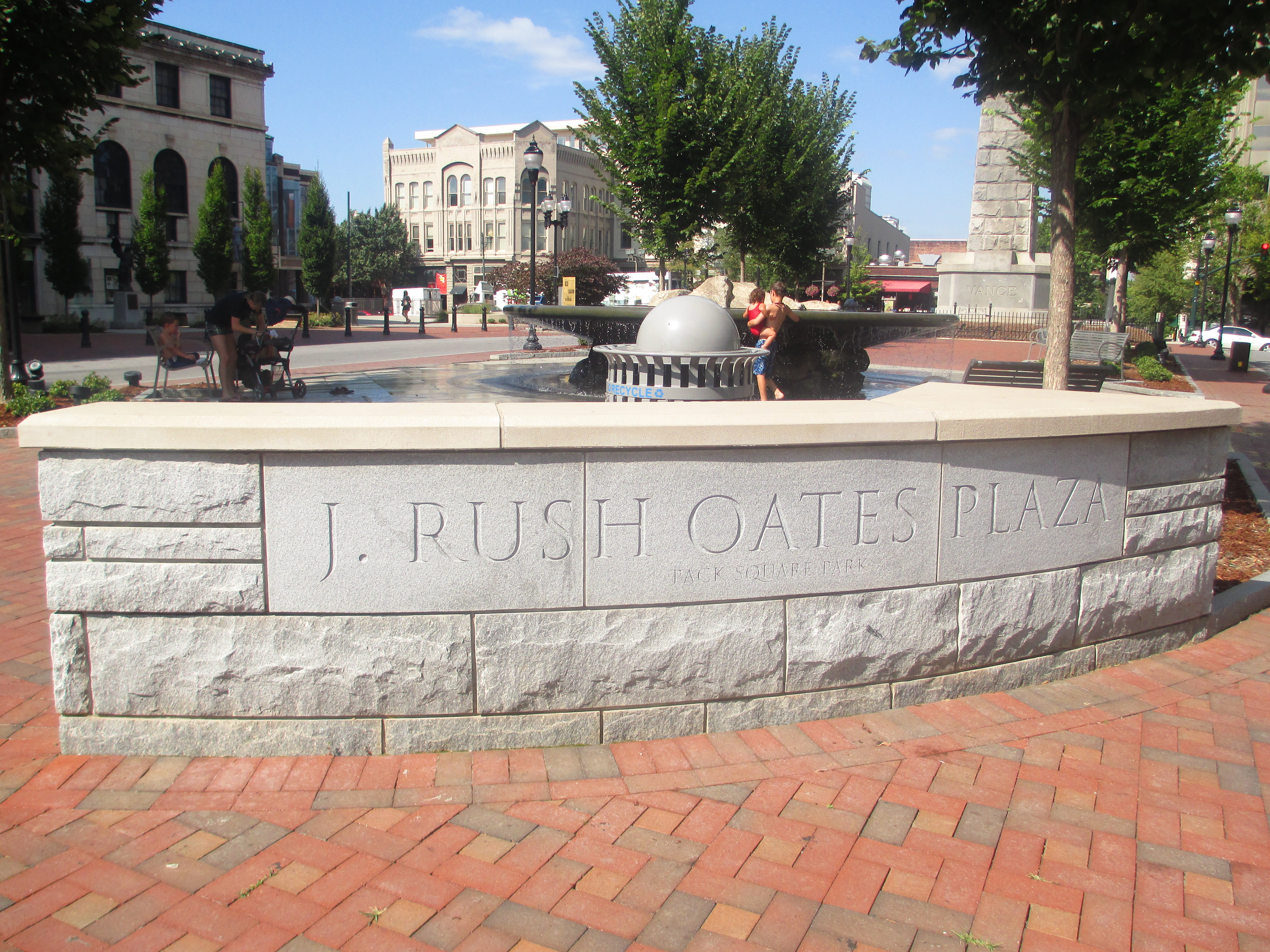
J. Rush Oates Plaza

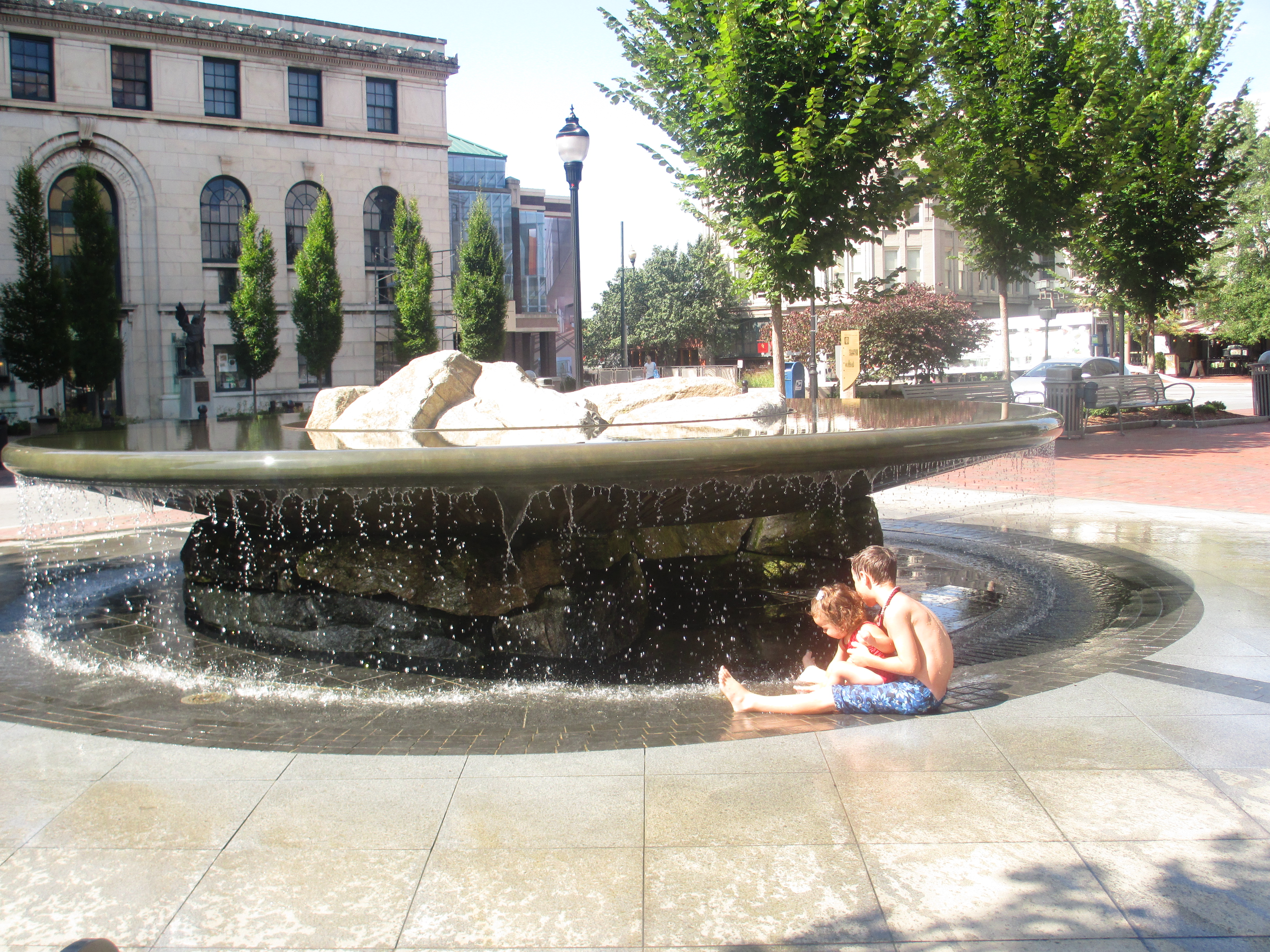
Fountain in Pack Square

=== Music ===
Live music is a significant element in the tourism-based economy of Asheville and the surrounding area. Seasonal festivals and numerous nightclubs and performance venues offer opportunities for visitors and locals to attend a wide variety of live entertainment events.

Asheville has a strong tradition of street performance and outdoor music, including festivals, such as Bele Chere and the Lexington Avenue Arts & Fun Festival (LAAFF). One event is "Shindig on the Green", which happens Saturday nights during July and August on City/County Plaza. By tradition, the Shindig starts "along about sundown" and features local bluegrass bands and dance teams on stage, and informal jam sessions under the trees surrounding the County Courthouse. The "Mountain Dance & Folk Festival" started in 1928 by Bascom Lamar Lunsford is said to be the first event ever labeled a "folk festival". Another popular outdoor music event is "Downtown After 5", a monthly concert series held from 5 pm until 9 pm that hosts popular touring musicians as well as local acts. A regular drum circle, organized by residents in Pritchard Park, is open to all and has been a popular local activity every Friday evening.

Asheville is also home of the Moog Music Headquarters and the museum of the Bob Moog Foundation.

Asheville plays host to The Warren Haynes Christmas Jam, an annual charity event which raises money for Habitat For Humanity, and features notable musicians. DJ music, as well as a small, but active, dance community are also components of the downtown musical landscape. The town is also home to the Asheville Symphony Orchestra, the Asheville Lyric Opera, the Land of the Sky Symphonic Band, the Asheville Jazz Orchestra, the Smoky Mountain Brass Band, and the Asheville Community Band. There are a number of bluegrass, country, and traditional mountain musicians in the Asheville area. A residency at local music establishment the Orange Peel by the Smashing Pumpkins in 2007, along with the Beastie Boys in 2009, brought national attention to Asheville. The rock band Band of Horses have recorded two albums at Echo Mountain Studios in Asheville, as have the Avett Brothers (who have also traditionally played a New Year's Eve concert in Asheville). Christian vocal group the Kingsmen originated in Asheville.

=== Performing arts ===
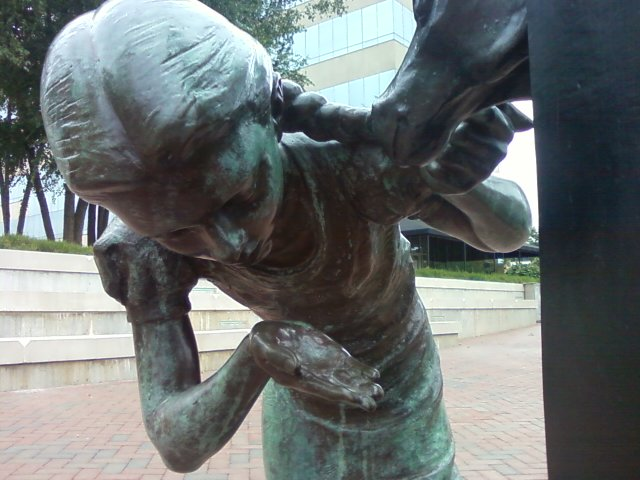
Sculpture in Downtown Asheville of a girl drinking from a fountain shaped like a horse

The Asheville Community Theatre was founded in 1946, producing the first amateur production of the Appalachian drama Dark of the Moon. Soon after, the young actors Charlton Heston and wife Lydia Clarke took over the small theatre. The current ACT building has two performance spaces – the Mainstage Auditorium (and named the Heston Auditorium), and the more intimate black box performance space 35below.

The Asheville Lyric Opera celebrated its tenth anniversary in 2009 with a concert featuring Angela Brown, David Malis, and Tonio Di Paolo, veterans of the Metropolitan Opera. The ALO has typically performed three fully staged professional operas for the community in addition to its vibrant educational program.

The Fringe Arts Festival features alternative performances.

=== Visual arts ===
- Asheville Art Museum, located on Pack Square in downtown Asheville, which reopened on November 14, 2019, after a $24 million renovation.
- Black Mountain College Museum + Arts Center, located on Pack Square in downtown Asheville, which presents exhibitions, performances and other public programs related to the history and influence of Black Mountain College.
- Flood Gallery Fine Art Center, a non-profit contemporary art institution formerly located in Asheville's River Arts District, downtown Asheville, and the nearby Town of Black Mountain before moving (after Hurricane Helene) to East Asheville
- The River Arts District, a formerly industrial section of Asheville along the French Broad River which began to house artist studios in the 1980s. By 2024, prior to Hurricane Helene, the RAD included 26 warehouses and 300 artists.
- The Southern Highland Craft Guild's Folk Art Center, dedicated to Appalachian craft traditions.
- The YMI Cultural Center, exhibiting art related to the heritage of African Americans in the area.

=== Film and television ===
Several brief-lived film festivals have been held in Asheville. The Asheville Film Festival was first held in 2003, but the City of Asheville ceased funding it in 2010. From 2011 to 2014, filmmakers Sandi and Tom Anton relaunched the defunct Asheville Film Fest as Asheville Cinema Fest. From 2016 to 2018, A-B Tech hosted an independent Asheville Film Festival without city sponsorship. The Asheville Jewish Film Festival began in 2009 and was most recently (as of 2024) held in 2019.

Currently active film and multimedia events in Asheville include the 48-Hour Film Project, which the city participates in annually; Cat Fly Fest, founded in 2017; Connect Beyond Festival, launched in 2018; and the Twin Rivers Media Festival, which held its 30th annual event in 2024.

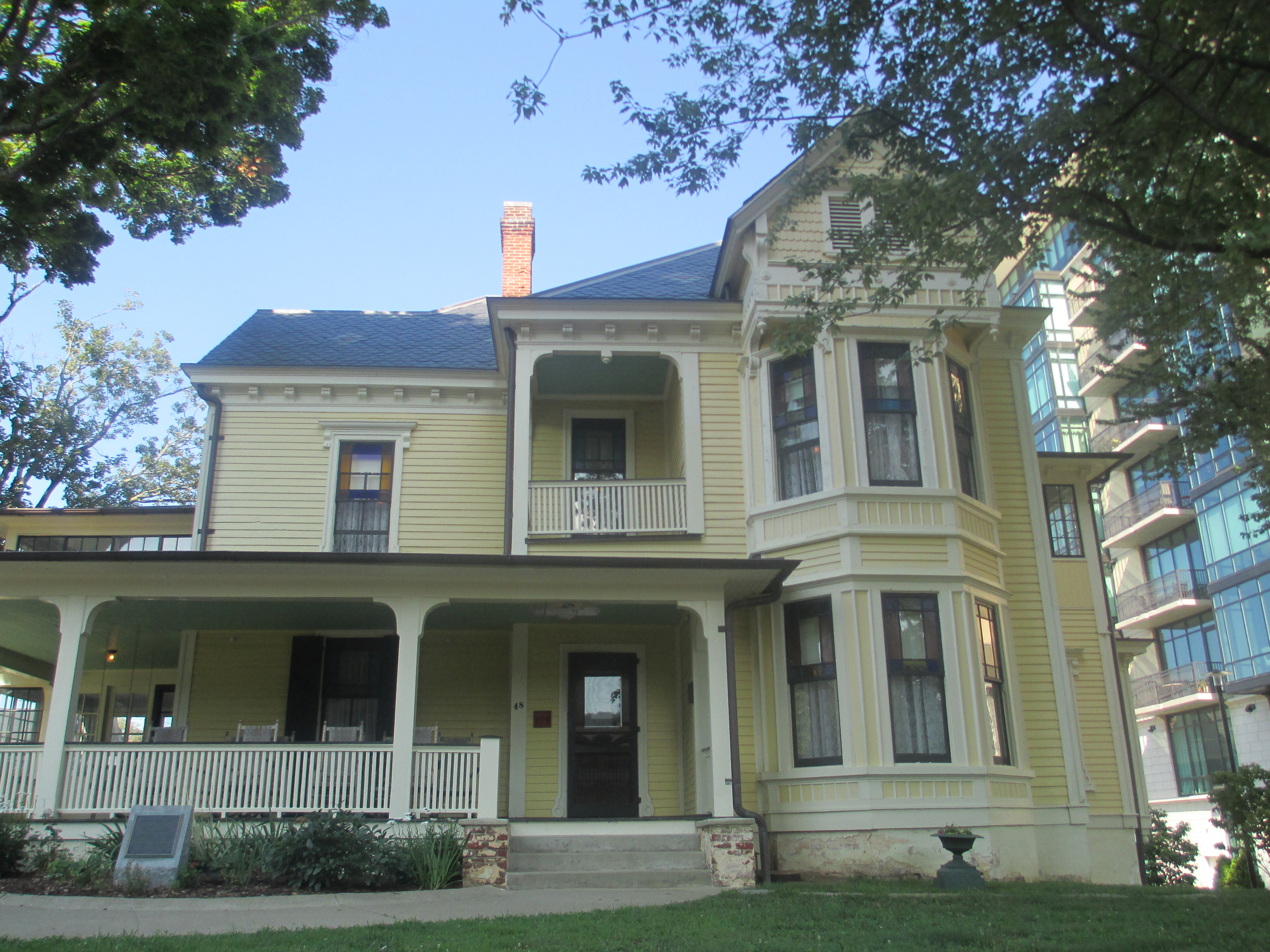
Thomas Wolfe House in downtown Asheville

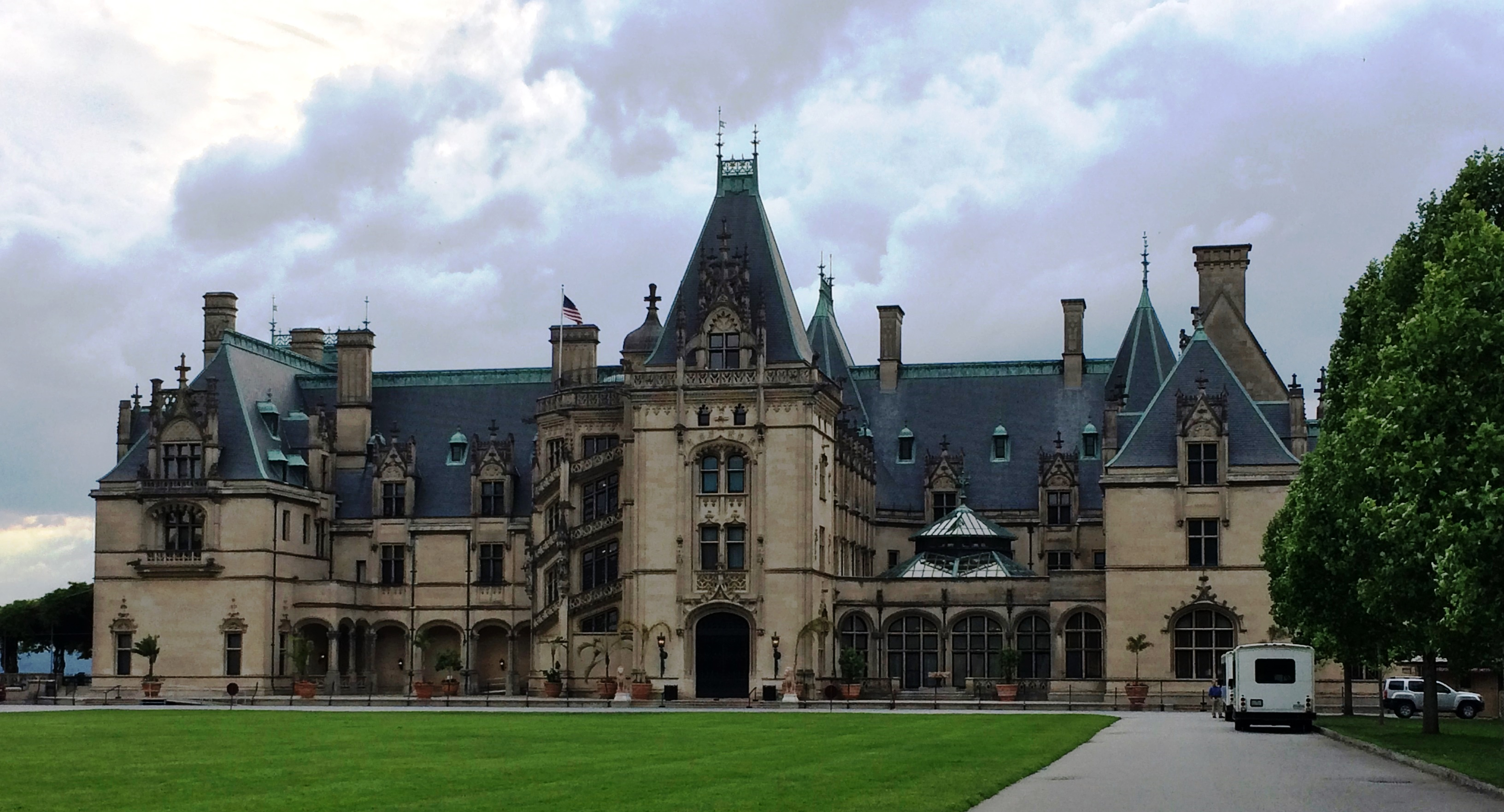
The Biltmore House on Biltmore Estate, the largest private residence in the United States

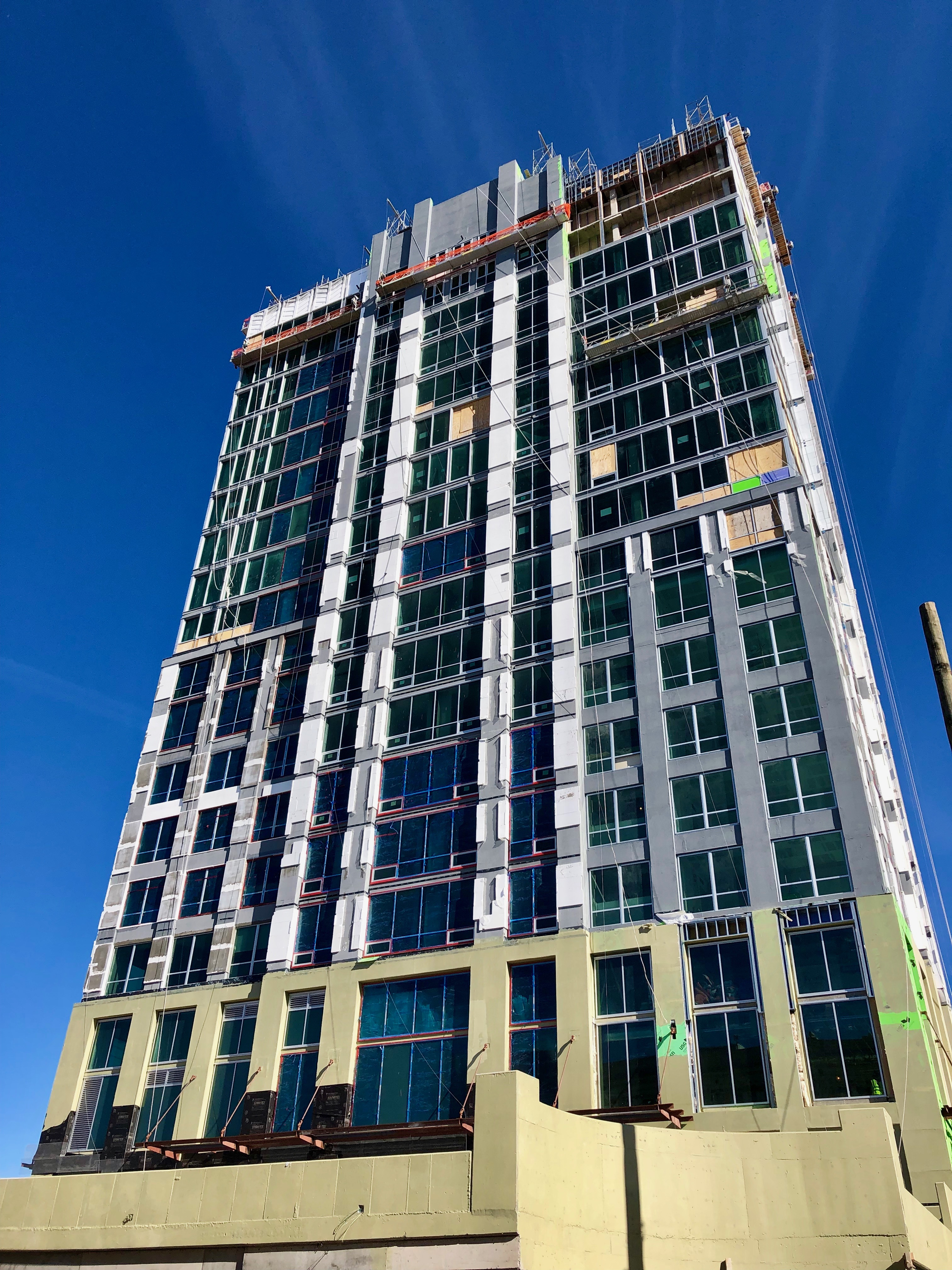
The Arras, formerly the BB&T Building

=== Places of worship ===
Places of worship in Asheville include the Roman Catholic Basilica of St. Lawrence, the Episcopal Cathedral of All Souls and St. Luke's Church, and the Jewish Congregation Beth Israel.

=== Restaurants ===
Asheville was the first U.S. city recognized by the Green Restaurant Association as a Green Dining Destination (significant density of green restaurants).

In 2022, two Asheville restaurants were given the James Beard Award. Chai Pani received Outstanding Restaurant and Cúrate received the award for Outstanding Hospitality. Asheville is also home to Cantonese chef J. Chong, who was a finalist on the HBO cooking competition The Big Brunch.

In 2025, three Asheville restaurants received Michelin Bib Gourmand awards: Luminosa, Little Chango, and Mother. Luminosa was also recognized with a Green Star for sustainability.

=== Points of interest ===
- The Arras, tallest structure in Asheville
- Biltmore Estate, largest privately owned house in the United States, and listed as U.S. National Historic Landmark
- Blue Ridge Parkway, a national parkway noted for its scenic beauty, known as "America's Favorite Drive"
- Botanical Gardens at Asheville, non-profit botanical gardens initially designed by Doan Ogden
- Demens-Rumbough-Crawley House, "Hanger Hall", built by Peter Demens, listed on the National Register of Historic Places
- Grove Park Inn, hotel listed on U.S. National Register of Historic Places
- HomeTrust Park, one of the oldest minor-league stadiums still in regular use
- Jackson Building, first skyscraper in western North Carolina
- North Carolina Arboretum, arboretum and botanical garden located within the Bent Creek Experimental Forest
- Smith-McDowell House, the city's first mansion and oldest surviving house, and the oldest brick structure in Buncombe County
- Thomas Wolfe House, boyhood home of author Thomas Wolfe, and a U.S. National Historic Landmark

== Sports ==
=== Current teams ===
Club	Sport	Founded	League	Venue
Asheville Tourists	Baseball	1897	South Atlantic League	HomeTrust Park
Asheville City SC	Soccer	2016	USL League Two	Greenwood Soccer Field at UNC Asheville
Asheville City SC (women's team)	Soccer	2017	USL W League	Greenwood Soccer Field at UNC Asheville

=== Previous teams ===
Club	Sport	Founded	League	Venue	Years in Asheville
Asheville Smoke	Ice hockey	1991	United Hockey League	Asheville Civic Center	1998-2002
Asheville Aces	Ice hockey	2004	Southern Professional Hockey League	Asheville Civic Center	2004-2005
Asheville Altitude	Basketball	2001	National Basketball Developmental League	Asheville Civic Center	2001-2005

=== Other sports ===
Area colleges and universities, such as the University of North Carolina at Asheville, compete in sports. UNCA's sports teams are known as the Bulldogs and play in the Big South Conference. The Fighting Owls of Warren Wilson College participate in mountain biking and ultimate sports teams. The college is also home of the Hooter Dome, where the Owls play their home basketball games. The Blue Ridge Rollergirls, Asheville's first women's flat-track roller derby team, was established in 2006.

== Parks and recreation ==
Asheville is a major hub of whitewater recreation, particularly whitewater kayaking, in the eastern US. Many kayak manufacturers have their bases of operation in the Asheville area. Some of the most distinguished whitewater kayakers live in or around Asheville. In its July/August 2006 journal, the group American Whitewater named Asheville one of the top five US whitewater cities.

Asheville is also home to numerous disc golf courses.

Soccer is another popular recreational sport in Asheville. There are two youth soccer clubs in Asheville, Asheville Shield Football Club and HFC.

The Asheville Hockey League provides opportunities for youth and adult inline hockey at an outdoor rink at Carrier Park. The rink is open to the public, and pick-up hockey is also available. The Asheville Civic Center has held recreational ice hockey leagues in the past.

== Government ==
=== Local government ===
The City of Asheville operates under a council–manager government, via its charter. A mayor and a six-member city council are elected at-large for staggered four-year terms. The city council appoints a city manager, a city attorney, and a city clerk. The city council appoints a vice-mayor from among its members. In the absence or disability of the mayor, the vice-mayor performs the mayoral duties. The city council determines the needs to be addressed and the degree of service to be provided by the administrative branch of city government.

The Governor of North Carolina maintains an official secondary residence, the North Carolina Governor's Western Residence, in Asheville.

In 2005 Mayor Charles Worley signed the U.S. Conference of Mayors Climate Protection Agreement and in 2006 the City Council created the Sustainable Advisory Committee on Energy and the Environment. In 2007 the Council became the first city on the East Coast to commit to building all municipal buildings to LEED Gold Standards and to achieve 80 percent energy reduction of 2001 standards by 2040. Also in 2007 the Council signed an agreement with Warren Wilson College stating the intent of the city and college to work together toward climate partnership goals.

Following President Donald Trump's decision to remove the United States from the Paris Agreement, Mayor Esther Manheimer was one of the original 61 mayors to commit to uphold the agreement in the city.

On July 14, 2020, the Asheville City Council voted unanimously to approve reparations to the city's Black citizens. The move came during the 2020 George Floyd protests. The resolution called for increased investment in Black communities in the city. The Buncombe County Board of Commissioners soon followed the adoption of the measure. The protest also started a move to remove and replace the Vance Monument in the city, concluding in its removal in May 2021.

The mayor is Esther Manheimer.

==== Controversy ====
In 2009, a group of Asheville citizens challenged the legitimacy of Cecil Bothwell's election to the City Council, citing the Constitution of North Carolina, which does not permit atheists to hold public office. Bothwell has described himself as a "post theist" rather than an atheist, and is a member of a local Unitarian Universalist congregation. The opponents to his election never filed suit. In response to the charge, legal scholars explained that the U.S. Supreme Court held in Torcaso v. Watkins that religious tests for political office are unconstitutional.

Bothwell served his four-year council term and was re-elected in 2013. He was defeated in the primary when he ran for a third term in 2017.

While the city council elections are non-partisan, party politics may enter into play, as Republican and Democratic party members back their registered members' candidacy. An effort by the council to return to partisan elections was defeated by voters in a referendum held in November 2007.

=== Law enforcement ===
The Asheville Police Department (APD) was created in 1849. It has been accredited by the Commission on Accreditation for Law Enforcement Agencies since 1994.

=== State government ===
In the North Carolina Senate, most of Asheville is in the 49th district, represented by Julie Mayfield (D), and a small portion of the eastern part of the city is in the 46th district, represented by Warren Daniel (R). In the North Carolina House of Representatives, Asheville is split between the 114th, 115th, and 116th districts, represented by J. Eric Ager (D), Lindsey Prather (D), and Caleb Rudow (D), respectively.

=== Federal government ===
In the 2012 presidential election, Barack Obama won the entirety of Buncombe County with 55% of the vote. Obama visited the city on a few occasions. In April 2010, he and his family vacationed in the city.

In the United States presidential election of 2016, Hillary Clinton won 54% of the vote in Buncombe County and Donald Trump 40%, according to the North Carolina State Board of Elections. In 2020, Joe Biden won 59.74% of the vote in Buncombe County and Donald Trump 38.63%.

Asheville is a college town that, similar to many other American college towns, has seen its partisan lean since 2000 shift from Republican leaning to solidly Democratic — where George W. Bush won the county by 11 points in 2000, Joe Biden won the county by 21 points in 2020 — a 32-point swing in two decades.

North Carolina is represented in the United States Senate by Thom Tillis (R–Huntersville) and Ted Budd (R–Advance). The city of Asheville is located in North Carolina's 11th congressional district, which is currently represented by Chuck Edwards (R–Flat Rock).

== Education ==
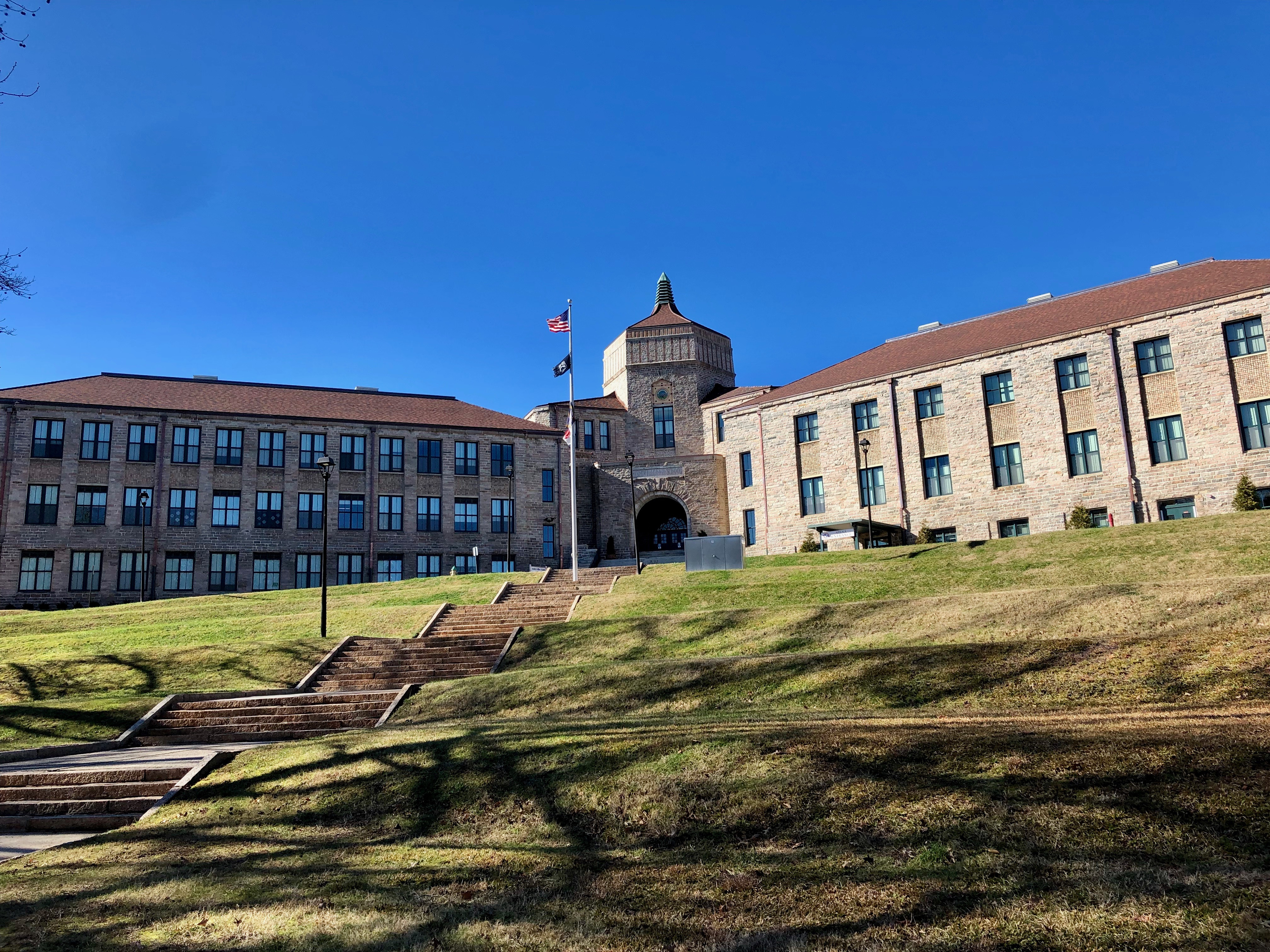
Asheville High School, designed by Douglas Ellington

Students (K–12) are assigned to one of two public school systems in the city of Asheville, Buncombe County Schools or Asheville City Schools, based on address.

Public Asheville City Schools include Asheville High School (known as Lee H Edwards High School 1935–1969), School of Inquiry and Life Sciences at Asheville, Asheville Middle School, Claxton Elementary, Randolph Learning Center, Hall Fletcher Elementary, Isaac Dickson Elementary, Ira B. Jones Elementary, and Lucy Herring Elementary.

The Buncombe County Schools System operates high schools, middle schools and elementary schools both inside and outside the city of Asheville. North Buncombe High School, T. C. Roberson High School and A. C. Reynolds High School are three Buncombe County schools located in Asheville.

Asheville was formerly home to one of the few Sudbury schools in the Southeast, Katuah Sudbury School. It is also home to several charter schools, including Francine Delany New School for Children (one of the first charter schools in North Carolina), ArtSpace Charter School, Invest Collegiate Imagine, and Evergreen Community Charter School, an Outward Bound-Expeditionary Learning School, recognized as one of the most environmentally conscious schools in the country.

Two private residential high schools are located in the Asheville area: the all-male Christ School (located in Arden) and the co-educational Asheville School. Other private schools include Carolina Day School, Veritas Christian Academy, Asheville Catholic School, Canongate Catholic High School, and Asheville Christian Academy.

=== Colleges ===
Asheville and its surrounding area have several institutions of higher education:

- Asheville–Buncombe Technical Community College
- Lenoir–Rhyne University, center for Graduate Studies of Asheville
- South College (Asheville campus)
- University of North Carolina at Asheville

== Media ==
Asheville is in the "Greenville-Spartanburg-Asheville-Anderson" television DMA and the "Asheville" radio ADI for the city's radio stations.

The primary television station in Asheville is WLOS Channel 13, an affiliate of ABC with MyNetworkTV on its second digital subchannel. Studios for WLOS are in Biltmore Park and a transmitter for the station is on Mount Pisgah as of 2024. Other stations licensed to Asheville include WUNF, a PBS (UNC-TV) member station on Channel 33 and independent station WYCW on Channel 62. Asheville is also served by the Upstate South Carolina stations of WYFF Channel 4 (NBC, with CBS on DT3), WSPA-TV Channel 7 (The CW), WHNS-TV Channel 21 (FOX), WMYA Channel 40 (Roar) and W41BQ Channel 41 (3ABN). PBS member stations from the Upstate of South Carolina (via South Carolina Educational Television) are generally not carried on cable systems in the North Carolina portion of the DMA, though are accessible via an HD antenna in some areas.

The Asheville Citizen-Times is Asheville's daily newspaper, which covers most of Western North Carolina. The Mountain Xpress is the largest weekly in the area, covering arts and politics in the region. The Asheville Daily Planet is a monthly paper. Asheville Watchdog is an online-only publication.

The Biltmore Beacon is a weekly newspaper specifically written to be of interest to residents and businesses in the various Biltmore communities including Biltmore Forest, Biltmore Park, Biltmore Lake, and Biltmore Village.

WCQS: Blue Ridge Public Radio is Asheville's public radio station. It airs National Public Radio news and other programs, classical and jazz music. WYQS (BPR News) is the sister station to WCQS, offering local news and NPR programming.

Friends of Community Radio created WSFM-LP, a volunteer-based, grassroots community radio station. The station is licensed under the "Free Form" format. There are also a variety of broadcasts dedicated to poetry, interviews, selected topics, children's radio, and comedy. The staff have remote broadcast many local concerts including Monotonix from Israel, JEFF the Brotherhood from Nashville, Screaming Females from New Jersey, and local acts.

== Infrastructure ==
=== Transportation ===
Asheville is served by Asheville Regional Airport in the southernmost portion of the city, and by Interstate 40 (east-west), Interstate 240 (north loop from I-40), and Interstate 26 (north-south). Additional major roadways providing access to Asheville include U.S. routes 19 and 74, and North Carolina state routes 191 and 280. Passenger rail service is not available for the city.

The Norfolk Southern Railway passes through the city, but passenger service is no longer available in the area. The city was last served in 1975 by the Southern Railway's Asheville Special (New York–Washington–Asheville, ended, 1970; Asheville–Salisbury, ended, 1975). Before that, it was served by the Southern's Skyland Special (Asheville-Columbia-Jacksonville, ended, 1959) and Carolina Special (Cincinnati-Goldsboro and Charleston branches, ended, 1968). In 1968, passenger service shifted from Asheville's station to the nearby Biltmore station. The Asheville station, built in 1905, was demolished.

Asheville offers public transit through the ART (Asheville Rides Transit) bus service that operates across the city and to the town of Black Mountain. ART's sixteen lines originate from a central station located at 49 Coxe Avenue.

The North Carolina Department of Transportation has proposed the restoration of train service between Asheville and Salisbury, as has Amtrak.

=== Public services and utilities ===
The residents of Asheville are served by the Buncombe County Public Libraries, consisting of 11 branches located throughout the county; the headquarters and central library, Pack Memorial Library, is located in downtown Asheville. The system includes a law library in the Buncombe County Courthouse and a genealogy and local history department located in the central library.

Drinking water in Asheville is provided by the Asheville water department. The water system consists of three water treatment plants, more than 1,600 miles (2,600 km) of water lines, 30 pumping stations and 27 storage reservoirs.

Sewer services are provided by the Metropolitan Sewerage District of Buncombe County, power provided by Duke Energy, and natural gas is provided by PSNC Energy.

=== Healthcare ===
Mission Hospital, an 815-bed hospital and Level I trauma center operated by HCA Healthcare, is the only hospital in Asheville. State lawmakers have expressed concern over HCA's monopoly on hospital services in the Asheville area. Currently under construction are a 67-bed hospital by AdventHealth in Weaverville and a 34-bed hospital by Novant Health on the South Asheville/Arden border. As of 2026, UNC Health has proposed a new hospital in West Asheville, and all extant and under construction hospitals have proposed expansions.

== Sister cities ==
Asheville's sister cities are:

- Birnam, Scotland
- Dunkeld, Scotland
- Karpenisi, Greece
- Osogbo, Nigeria
- San Cristóbal de las Casas, Mexico
- Saumur, France
- Valladolid, Mexico
- Vladikavkaz, Russia

== In popular culture ==
Author Thomas Wolfe (d. 1938) was born and grew up here, writing about the city; he and O. Henry (d.1910) are buried in Riverside Cemetery. Other authors with Asheville ties include Charles Frazier (Cold Mountain), Chicago poet Carl Sandburg (d.1967 in his home in Flat Rock), and F. Scott Fitzgerald (who wrote while staying at the Grove Park Inn).

Thomas Wolfe's debut novel Look Homeward, Angel (1929) is set largely in Asheville and features a protagonist recognizably similar to the author; the town is named Altamont in the book.

The 2008 film Anywhere, U.S.A. was locally produced, and won a Special Jury Prize for Spirit of Independence at the 2008 Sundance Film Festival. The character Harrison Shepherd, the narrator and protagonist of Barbara Kingsolver's 2009 novel The Lacuna, lived in Asheville. Asheville is featured as a location in the 2009 novel One Second After by William R. Forstchen (an area resident).

The 2012 film The Hunger Games was filmed near Asheville, as was the 2017 film Three Billboards Outside Ebbing, Missouri. The North Carolina tourism board has developed a guide for visitors interested in sites used in the film.

In 2025, the musician Glaive released a song named after Asheville as the lead single for his third studio album, Y'all.

== See also ==
- Sunset Stampede
