= Jackson Building (Asheville, North Carolina) =

Building in North Carolina, United States

Coordinates: 35.5949°N 82.5505°W

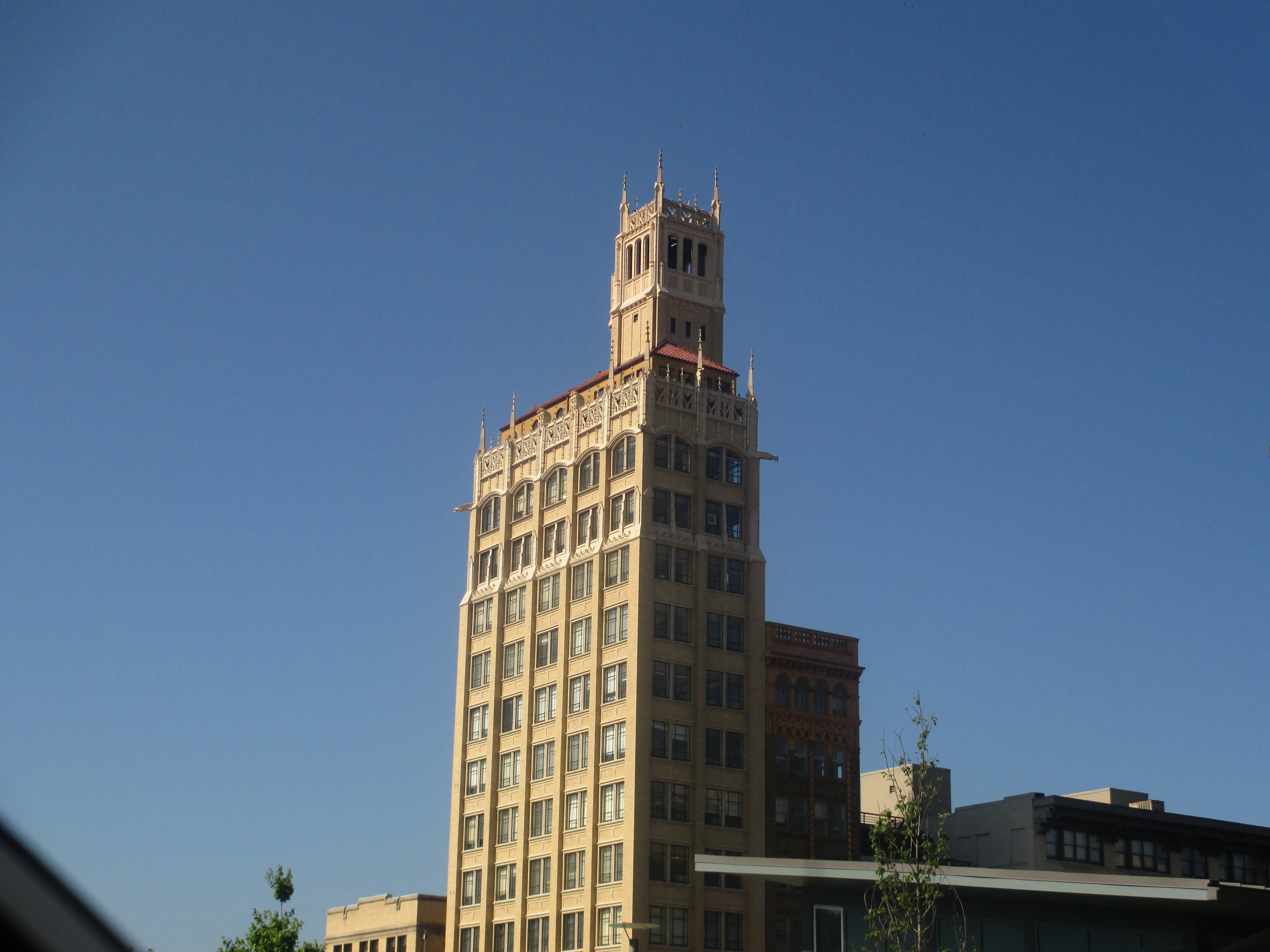
Jackson Building opened in 1924 in Asheville, North Carolina.

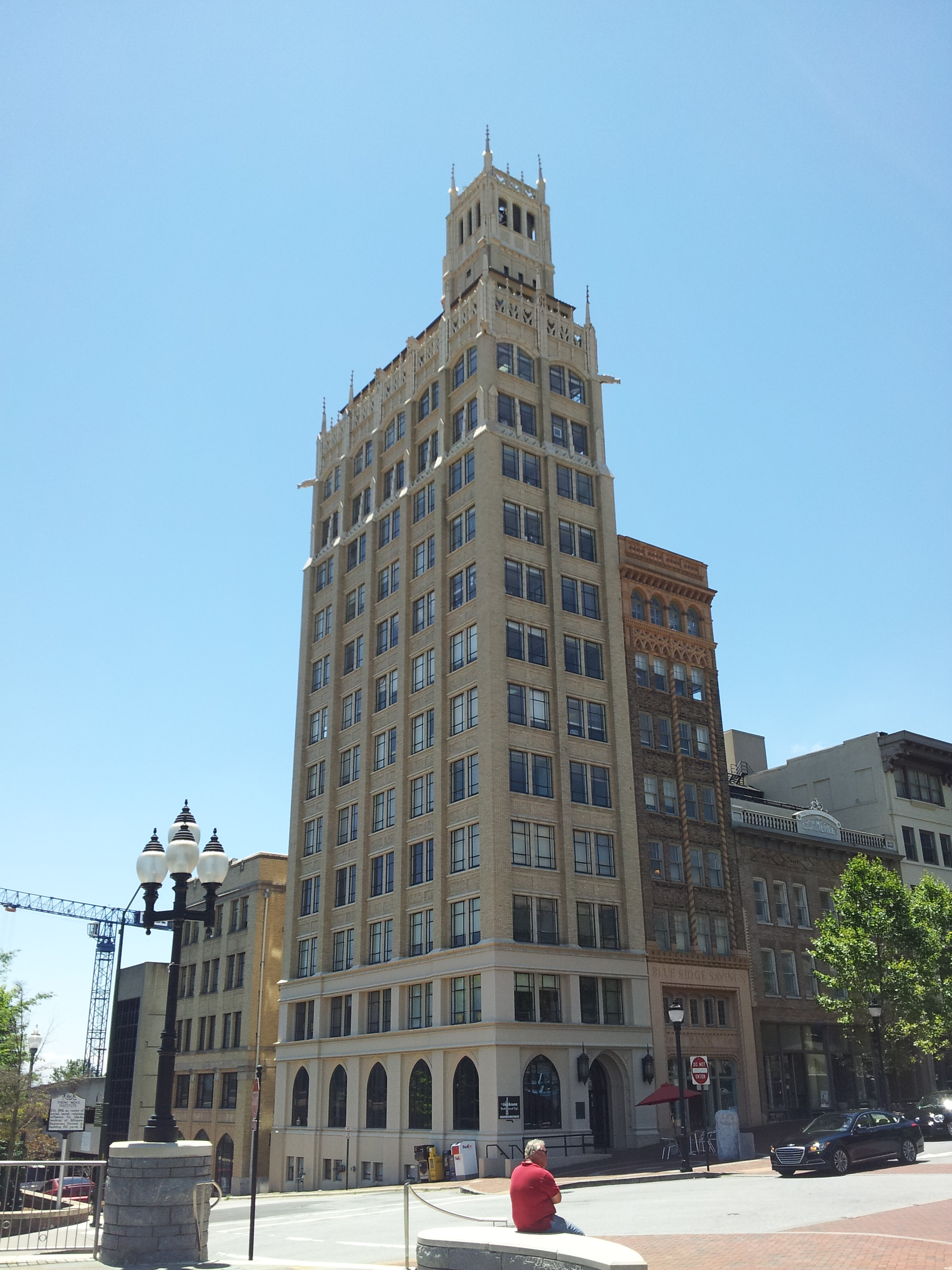
Jackson Building in Asheville, NC.

The Jackson Building is a 140 ft (43m) 15-story building in downtown Asheville, North Carolina, which was completed in 1924 in Pack Square. It was the first skyscraper in western North Carolina.

== History ==
The site chosen by developer Lynwood B. Jackson for western North Carolina's first skyscraper was previously that of the tombstone business operated by Thomas Wolfe's father. It was only 27 by 60 feet and believed to be too small for a skyscraper, but it now holds the record for tallest building on the smallest lot. Jackson hired architect Ronald Greene. Jackson built the city's first skyscraper because he believed in Asheville's real estate market. The foundation had to be dug deeper than usual and Jackson and his brother Winston stayed there for three nights making sure it did not cave in. Jackson put his office on the top floor and his sister Alberta claimed he kept a rope to climb down in case of fire.

The Neo-Gothic building was fully occupied when it opened in 1924. The observation tower had a 400x telescope and an 18 million candlepower searchlight intended to attract tourists. The grotesques on each corner are not functional; there are small holes in the mouths to let water escape and not freeze in the terracotta. Next to the Jackson Building was the 8-story Westall Building, also designed by Greene which was not large enough for its own elevator. For this reason, the two buildings have the same elevator system.

Pack Square Investors LLC and others bought the Jackson Building and other properties for $15 million in 2004 and sold them to Pack Square Property (Wicker Park Capital Management of Savannah, Georgia) for $28.3 million in 2017.
