= Henry Salem Hubbell =

American painter

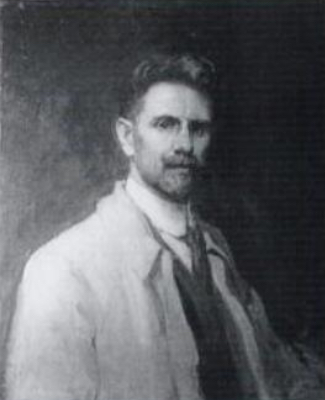
- Self-Portrait of the Artist (1913)
- Born: December 25, 1870; Paola, Kansas, U.S.
- Died: 1949; Miami, Florida, U.S.
- Education: Art Institute of Chicago, Académie Julian, Académie Carmen
- Known for: Painter
- Movement: American Impressionism, Portrait
- Spouse: Rose Strong Hubbell (m. 1895–1944)
- Awards: Paris Salon, 1901 (prize), 1904 (med.), 1906, 1908; PAFA, 1902, 1905-11, 1931; WMA, 1905 (prize); Corcoran Gal., 1907-08, 1910; AIC, 1910 (med.); Miami Pub. Lib., 1950 (memorial); Lowe AM, 1975 (retrospective); McKissick Mus., Univ. of South Carolina, Columbia, 1998, Spencer Art Museum, 2019

Henry Salem Hubbell (December 25, 1870 – 1949) was an American Impressionist painter who studied under William-Adolphe Bouguereau and James Abbott McNeill Whistler. In France, he became known for his figural works before returning to America to teach and travel the country working as a portrait artist, for which he received a number of estimable commissions, including from Presidents Herbert Hoover and Franklin D. Roosevelt. His paintings can be found in museums around the world, including the National Portrait Gallery, the Harvard Art Museums, and the Smithsonian American Art Museum.

== Life and career ==
=== Formative years ===
Henry Salem Hubbell was born on Christmas Day in Paola, Kansas. He moved with his family to Lawrence, Kansas at the age of four. In 1886, at just sixteen-year-old, he graduated from Lawrence High School.

Upon graduating, Hubbell moved to Chicago, where he began work as sign painter. A year later, he began studying at the School of the Art Institute of Chicago. While in Chicago, Hubbell learned under William Merrit Chase, Dennet Grover, and John Vanderpoel. In 1895, Hubbell was married to fellow art student, Nellie Rose Strong.

=== Education in Europe ===
Hubbell and his wife moved to Paris, France in the Autumn of 1898, where he studied at the Académie Julian under William-Adolphe Bouguereau, Jean-Joseph Benjamin-Constant, and Jean-Paul Laurens. Hubbell's first known work, "Mère et l'enfant apres W. Bouguereau" commonly referred to as "Mother and Child," was modeled after the paintings of Bouguereau, and featured smooth, barely visible brushstrokes and lifelike imagery. "Mother and Child after W. Bouguereau" was exhibited at Académie Julian to much fanfare, but Hubbell quickly left the school to study under James Abbott McNeill Whistler upon the opening of Académie Carmen.

Hubbell learned much from his new teacher, and Whistler considered Hubbell one of his best students, stating, "one day you will be called a great colorist." Whistler's influence, and especially his use of color can be seen in the first paintings that brought Hubbell international acclaim.

=== Worldwide recognition ===
Hubbell burst onto the international art scene upon receiving the Honorable Mention at the 1901 Paris Salon for "Une belle occasion. Une petite cuisine." Hubbell's subsequent works, "The Long Seam" and "The Coachman (Paris Cabman)" were reviewed favorably in the Paris press, with d'Arcy Moreil writing in the Paris American that: "This vigorous attempt to copy nature line by line seems an attempt to follow the example of the French master, Jules Bastien-Lepage." Hubbell exhibited paintings at the Paris Salon throughout the 1910s. In 1908, Hubbell joined the American Impressionists colony in Giverny, France, where he became friends with Claude Monet. In 1908-1909 he painted two of his masterworks, "By the Fireside" and "The Orange Robe" which were both exhibited in the 1909 Paris Salon to much fanfare, solidifying his place as a leading American Impressionist. French art critic Henry Austy wrote that "The Orange Robe" showed "a happy daring in the arrangement of the tones, a harmony in the composition, and a beautiful sentiment of intimacy and elegance.

In December 1909, Hubbell had five new paintings unveiled to the International Society of Painters, Sculptors and Gravers. He sold four paintings the afternoon the show opened. The French government purchased the fifth painting the following week.

=== Return to America ===
Despite his success in France, Hubbell longed to return to America, and did so in 1910, moving briefly to Chicago and then New York until he was hired to head the Painting Department at Carnegie Institute of Technology (now Carnegie Mellon University). In 1924, Hubbell and his family moved permanently to Miami, Florida, where he lived out the rest of his days.

In America, Hubbell became the leading portrait artist of his generation, capturing the likenesses of the fellow artist Harry Siddons Mowbray, U.S. Secretary of the Interior Harold Ickes, Supreme Court Justice Harlan F. Stone, and President Herbert Hoover and Franklin D. Roosevelt. Hubbell had a stroke in June, 1946, and after which he never painted again. In 1948, he donated one of his most celebrated paintings, By the Fireside, to Lawrence High School in Kansas, hoping the gift would inspire the growth of the arts in his hometown. He died a year later, in 1949.

== Notable works ==
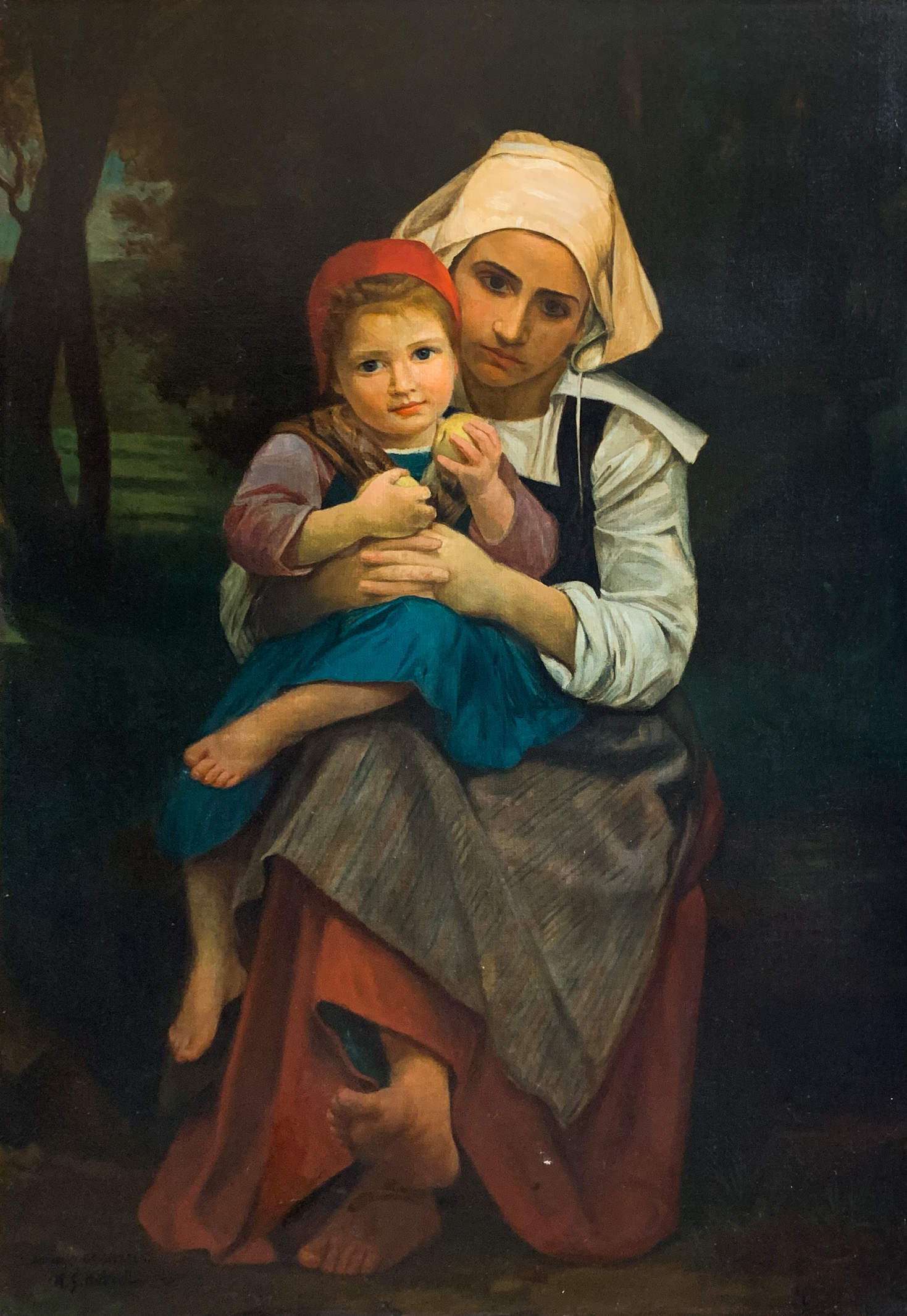
Mother and Child after W. Bouguereau (1898) Original French: Mère et l'enfant apres W. Bouguereau

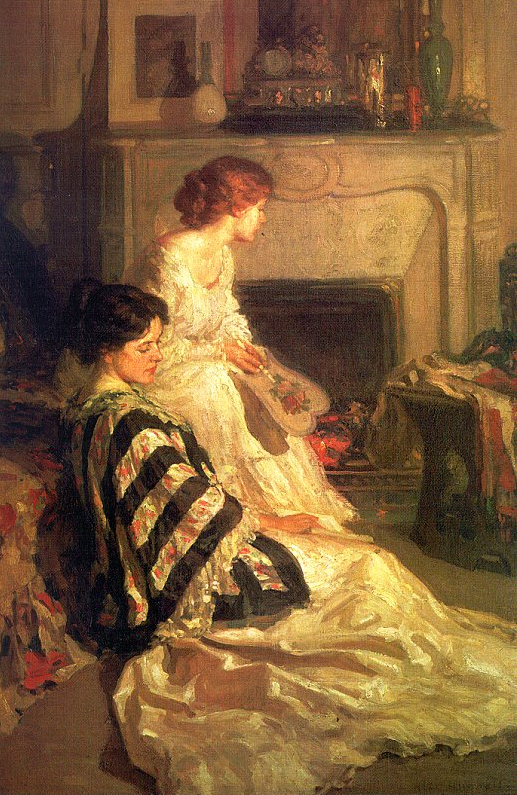
By the Fireside (1908)

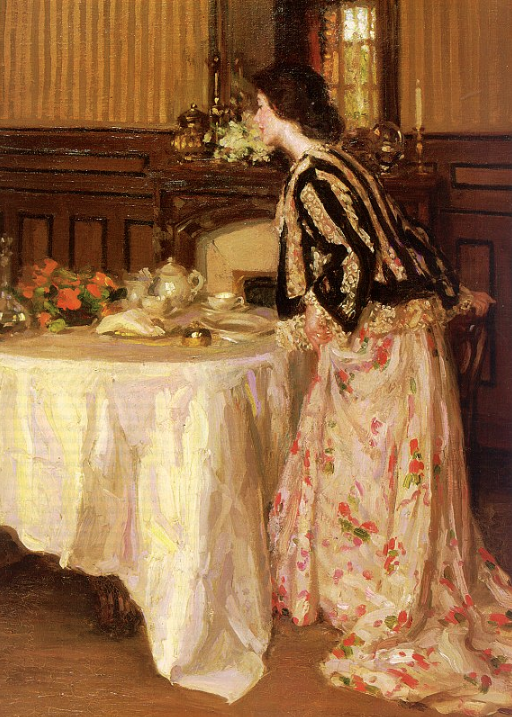
Tea Time (1909)

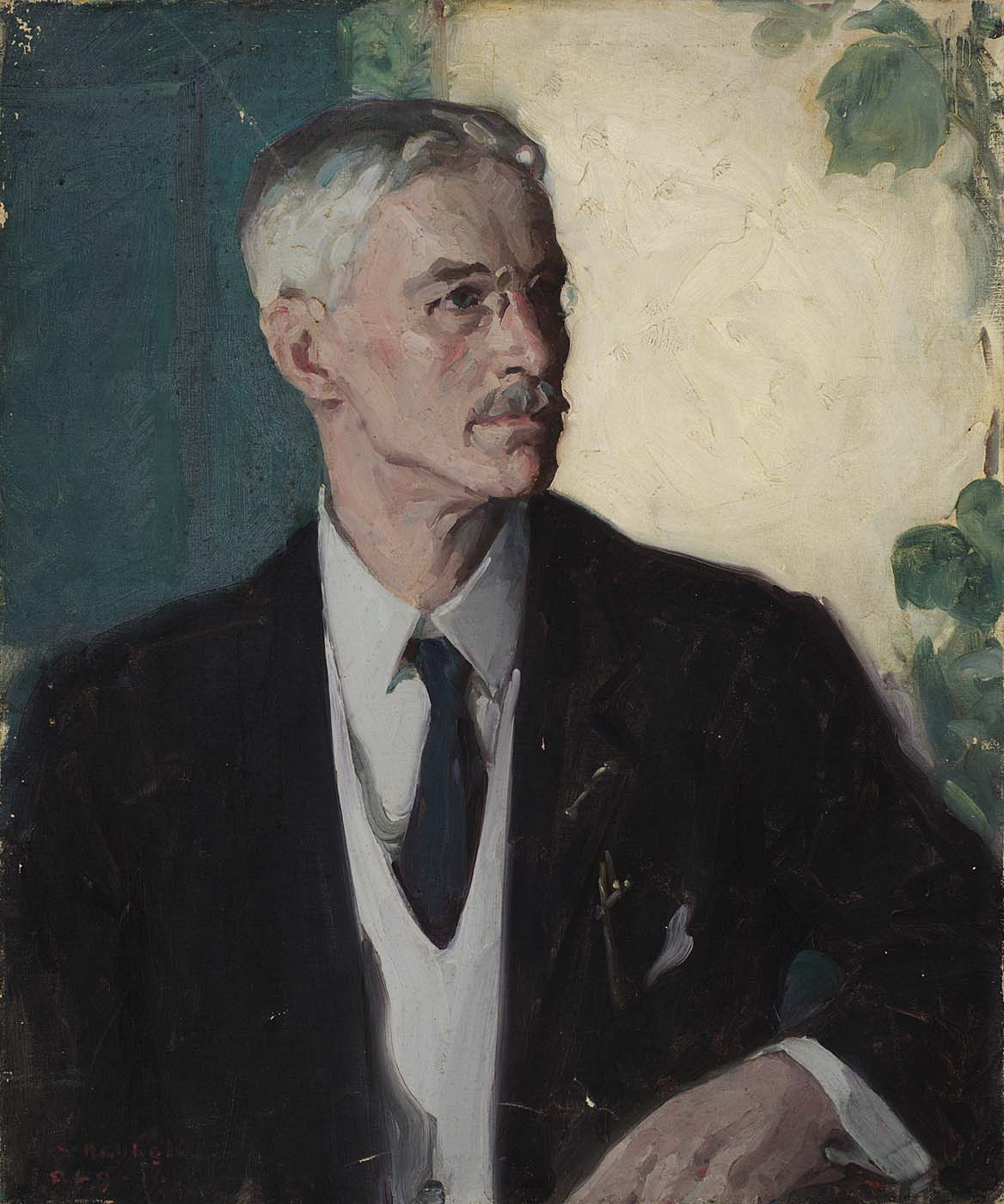
Portrait of H. Siddons Mowbray (1910)

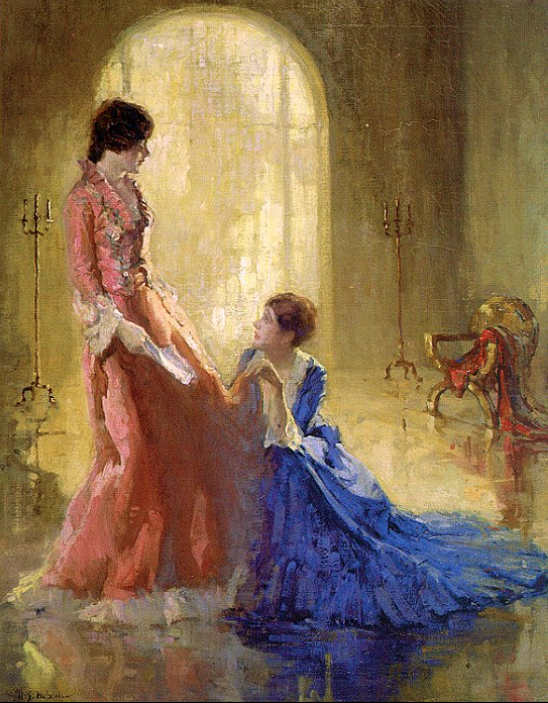
Luminous Reflection (1913)

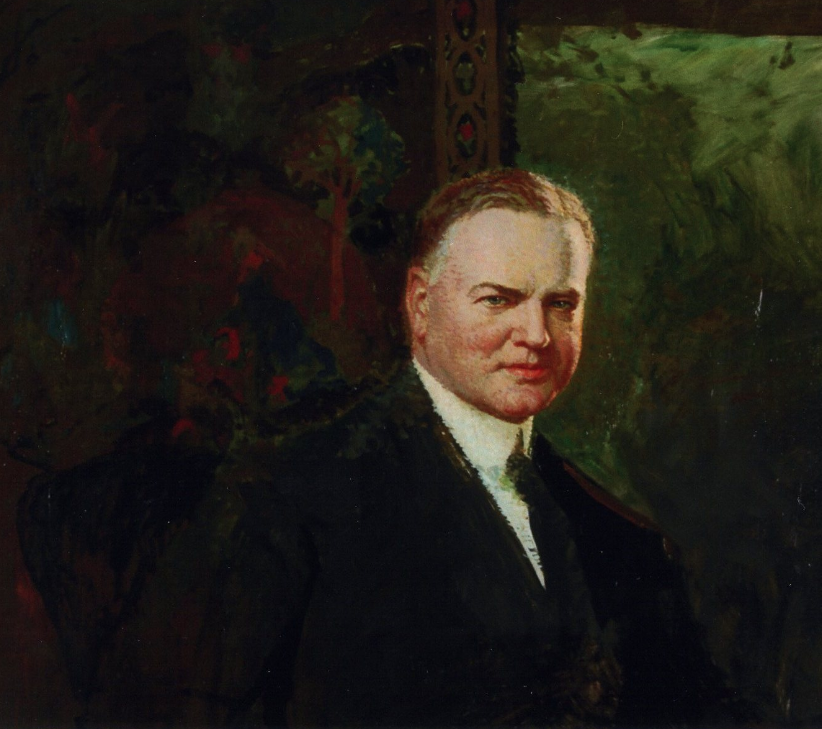
Herbert Hoover (1928)

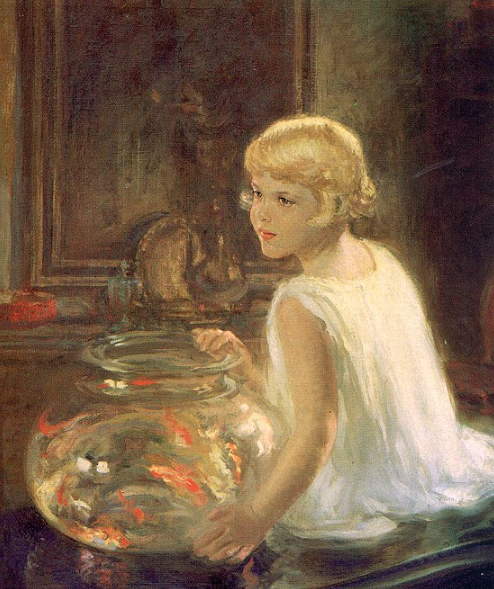
Rosemary and the Goldfish (1930)

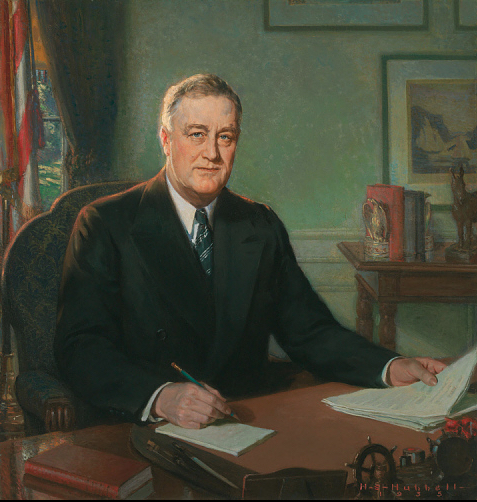
Franklin D. Roosevelt (1935)
