= Louise Elizabeth Garden MacLeod =

American painter

- Born: Louise Elizabeth Garden; April 25, 1857; London, England
- Died: 1944 (aged 86–87); Los Angeles, California, U.S.
- Other name: Louise MacLeod
- Education: Académie Carmen, Royal School of Art
- Spouse: Malcolm MacLeod (m. 1890–1914; his death)

Louise Elizabeth Garden–MacLeod (1857–1944) was an English-born American artist and arts educator. In 1887, she co-founded the Los Angeles School of Art and Design with Mrs. J. Dalton Bond, this was the first art school in the area.

== History ==
Louise Elizabeth Garden was born in London, England, on 25 April 1857. She began studying art at a young age and by the time she was a teenager she attended London's Royal School of Art in South Kensington. It was at the Royal School of Art she studying under N. G. Green, an instructor to the British royal family, as well as a pupil of George Dunlop Leslie, William Henry Fisk, Richard Eschke, and Leandro Ramón Garrido. She also studied at Whistler's School (also known as Académie Carmen) in Paris, France.

In 1887, she moved from London to Los Angeles, California in hopes that the milder weather would improve her health. That same year, co-founded the Los Angeles School of Art and Design with Mrs. J. Dalton Bond, this was the first art school in the area.

In 1890, she wed Malcolm MacLeod, a Scottish inventor who helped her with running the art school. They were married until MacLeod's death in 1914.
