= Mère et l'enfant apres W. Bouguereau =

1898 painting by Henry Salem Hubbell

Mother and Child after W. Bouguereau
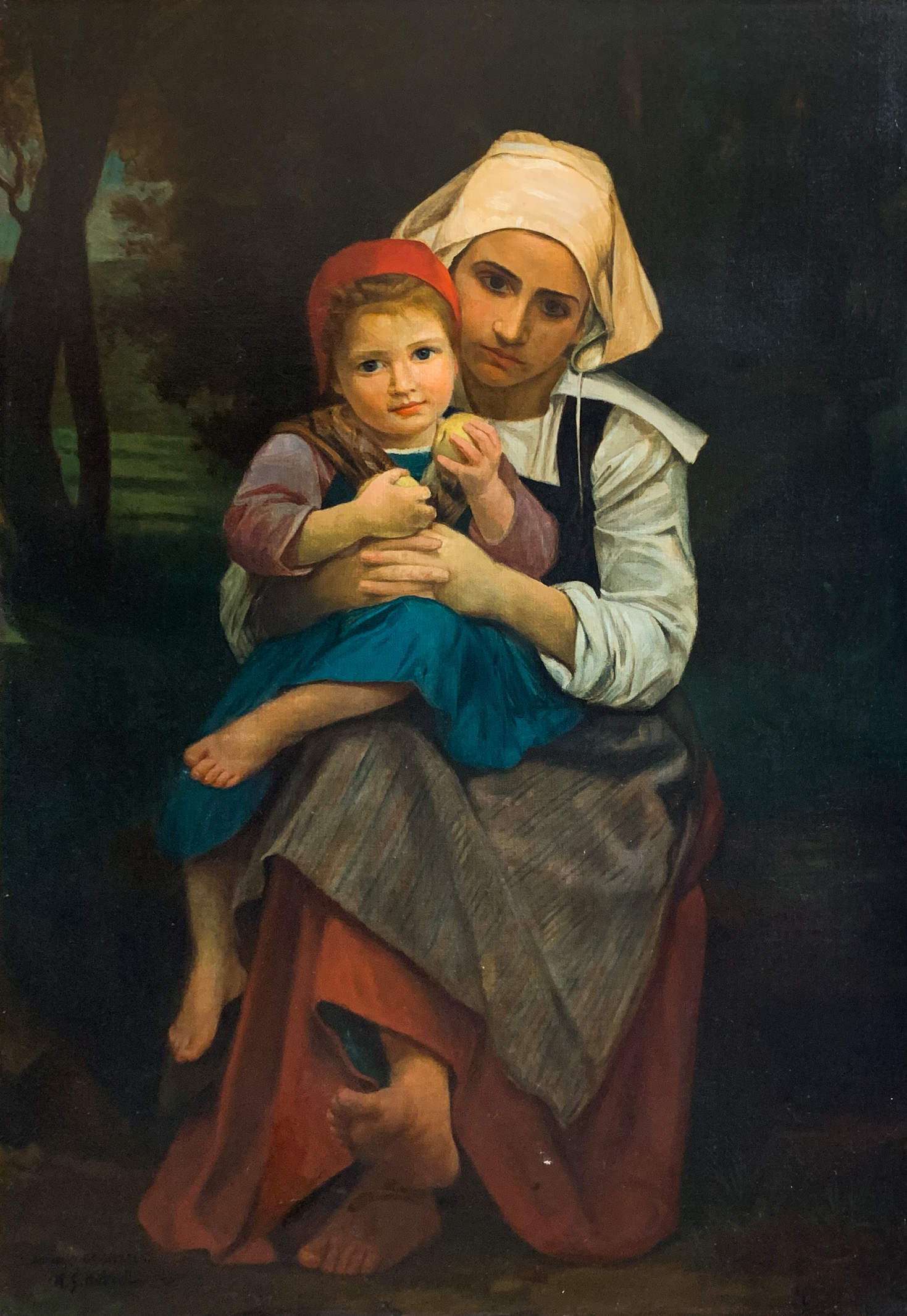
- Artist: Henry Salem Hubbell
- Year: 1898
- Medium: oil on canvas
- Dimensions: 82.55 cm × 55.88 cm (32.50 in × 22.00 in)

Mère et l'enfant apres W. Bouguereau (English name: "Mother and Child after W. Bouguereau") is an oil painting on canvas by Henry Salem Hubbell, completed in 1898, and is his earliest known work. Hubbell had moved to Paris, France to study painting at the Académie Julian under William-Adolphe Bouguereau, Jean-Joseph Benjamin-Constant, and Jean-Paul Laurens. He painted and exhibited Mother and Child before leaving to study with James Abbott McNeill Whistler at the Académie Carmen, and it is painted in the style of Bouguereau, featuring smooth, barely visible brushstrokes and lifelike imagery. It also features a female subject, head to toe, dressed in flowing clothes, which would become a staple of his style in the years to come.
