= Eugene Paul Ullman =

American painter (1877–1953)

Eugene Paul Ullman (March 27, 1877 – April 30, 1953) was an American Impressionist painter.

== Biography ==
He was the youngest of the five children of chemist and manufacturer Sigmund Ullman and Pauline Wimpfheimer. Ullman was born and grew up in New York City, and attended the Columbia Grammar & Preparatory School. He studied under William Merritt Chase at the Chase School, where he was later an instructor. He studied further in Paris, under James McNeill Whistler at the Académie Carmen.

Ullman married fellow artist Alice Woods in Belgium in 1903. They lived in Paris, and had two sons, both of whom became artists. The Ullmans were part of the intellectual circle of Leo and Gertrude Stein, and friends with Arnold Bennett, Ezra Pound, Alan Seeger, and Booth Tarkington. Ullman painted portraits of several members of the group.

Ullman worked in a military hospital during World War I. He and his wife separated in 1917, and divorced in 1921.

Ullman married Suzanne Lioni in 1927, and they had a son Pierre (b. 1929). The couple and Pierre, along with son Paul and his family, fled from Paris to the United States in 1940, to escape the Nazi occupation of France. Paul volunteered as an ambulance driver for the American Field Service during World War II, and secretly worked as a spy. Paul parachuted behind enemy lines prior to the June 1944 Normandy Invasion, and was shot and killed by the Gestapo. Ullman accepted France's Croix de Guerre on Paul's behalf.

After the war, Ullman and his family settled in Westport, Connecticut. He returned to France after his wife's death in 1950. He died in Paris in 1953.

=== Exhibitions, honors and awards ===
Ullman exhibited at the National Academy of Design, beginning in 1902. He exhibited regularly at the Pennsylvania Academy of the Fine Arts from 1902 to 1913, and was awarded PAFA's 1906 Temple Gold Medal for his Portrait of Madame Fisher. He was awarded a bronze medal at the 1904 World's Fair in St. Louis; and a silver medal at the 1915 Panama–Pacific International Exposition in San Francisco.

He was a member of the Salmagundi Club in New York City.

His works are in the collections of the Brooklyn Museum, the Indianapolis Museum of Art, the Tampa Museum of Art, the Musée National de la Coopération Franco-Américaine in Blérancourt, France, The University of Wisconsin Art History Gallery, The Milwaukee Public Central Library, and other museums.

== Selected works ==
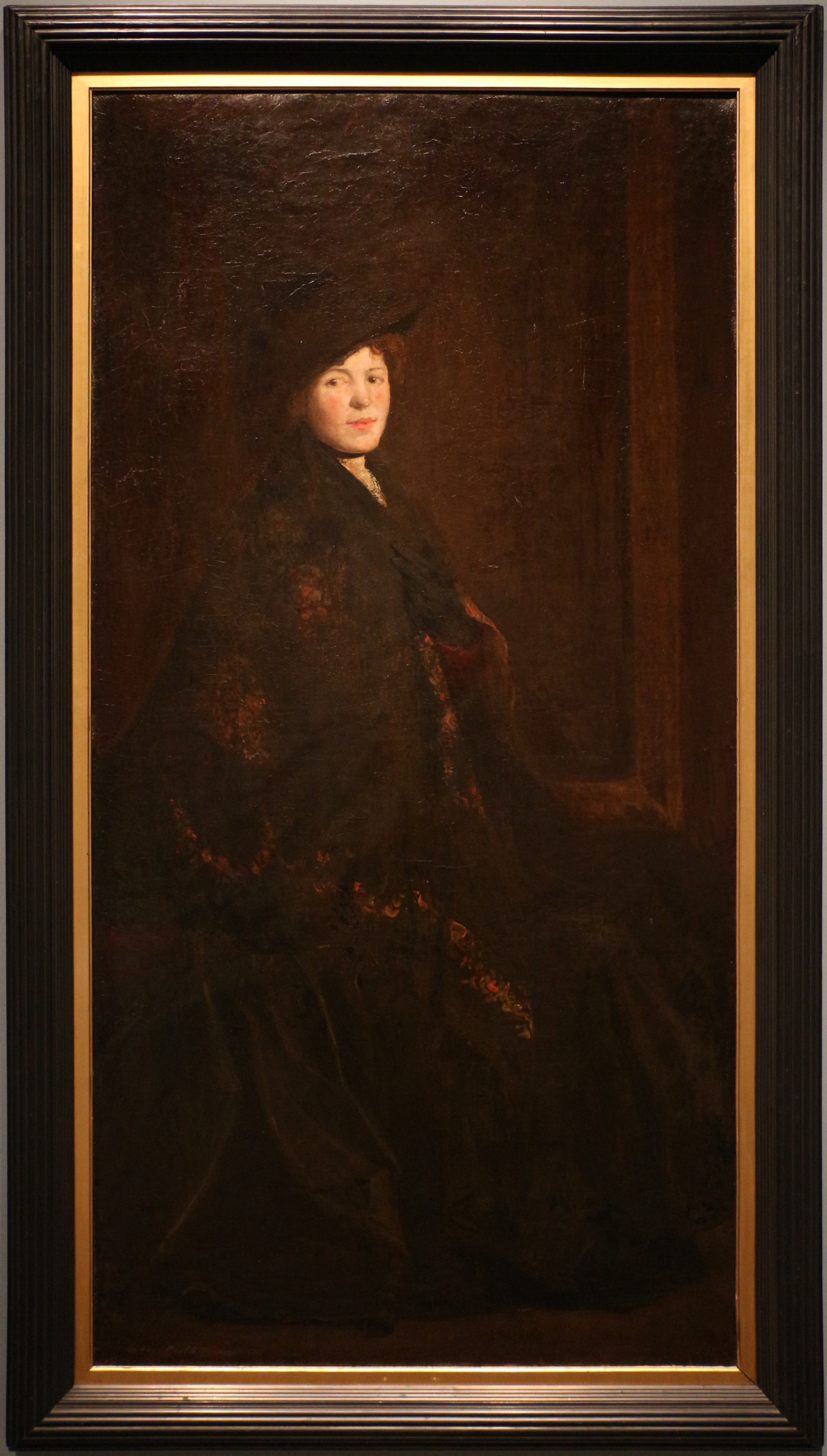
Portrait of Madame Fisher (ca.1904), Indianapolis Museum of Art

- Portrait of William Merritt Chase (1903), Musée National de la Coopération Franco-Américaine, Blérancourt, France
- The Arnold Bennetts at Home in Fontainebleau (1903)
- Portrait of Madame Fisher (c.1904), Indianapolis Museum of Art, Indianapolis, Indiana. Winner of PAFA's 1906 Temple Gold Medal
- Lady at the Buffet (1906), Emile H. Mathis Gallery, University of Wisconsin–Milwaukee, Wisconsin
- Portrait of Mrs. Booth Tarkington (1906), unlocated
- Portrait of Hanako San (c.1908), Guild Hall, East Hampton, New York
- The Sea (1909), Indianapolis Museum of Art, Indianapolis, Indiana
- Portrait of Ezra Pound (1911), unlocated
- Portrait of Margaret Cravens (1911), unlocated
- After the Carnival (1911), Emile H. Mathis Gallery, University of Wisconsin–Milwaukee, Wisconsin
- Portrait of Gertrude Stein, unlocated
- Wounded Zouaves in the American Ambulance Hospital (1915), Musée National de la Coopération Franco-Américaine, Blérancourt, France
- The Bath (1924), Brooklyn Museum, Brooklyn, New York City
- Seated Woman with Cat (1920s), Heckscher Museum of Art, Huntington, New York
- Provence Landscape (1920s), Heckscher Museum of Art, Huntington, New York
- Nude before Antique Screen (c.1938), Tampa Museum of Art, Tampa, Florida
- Portrait of Abraham Walkowitz (1943), Newark Museum, Newark, New Jersey
