= Alice Woods Ullman =

American painter (1871–1959)

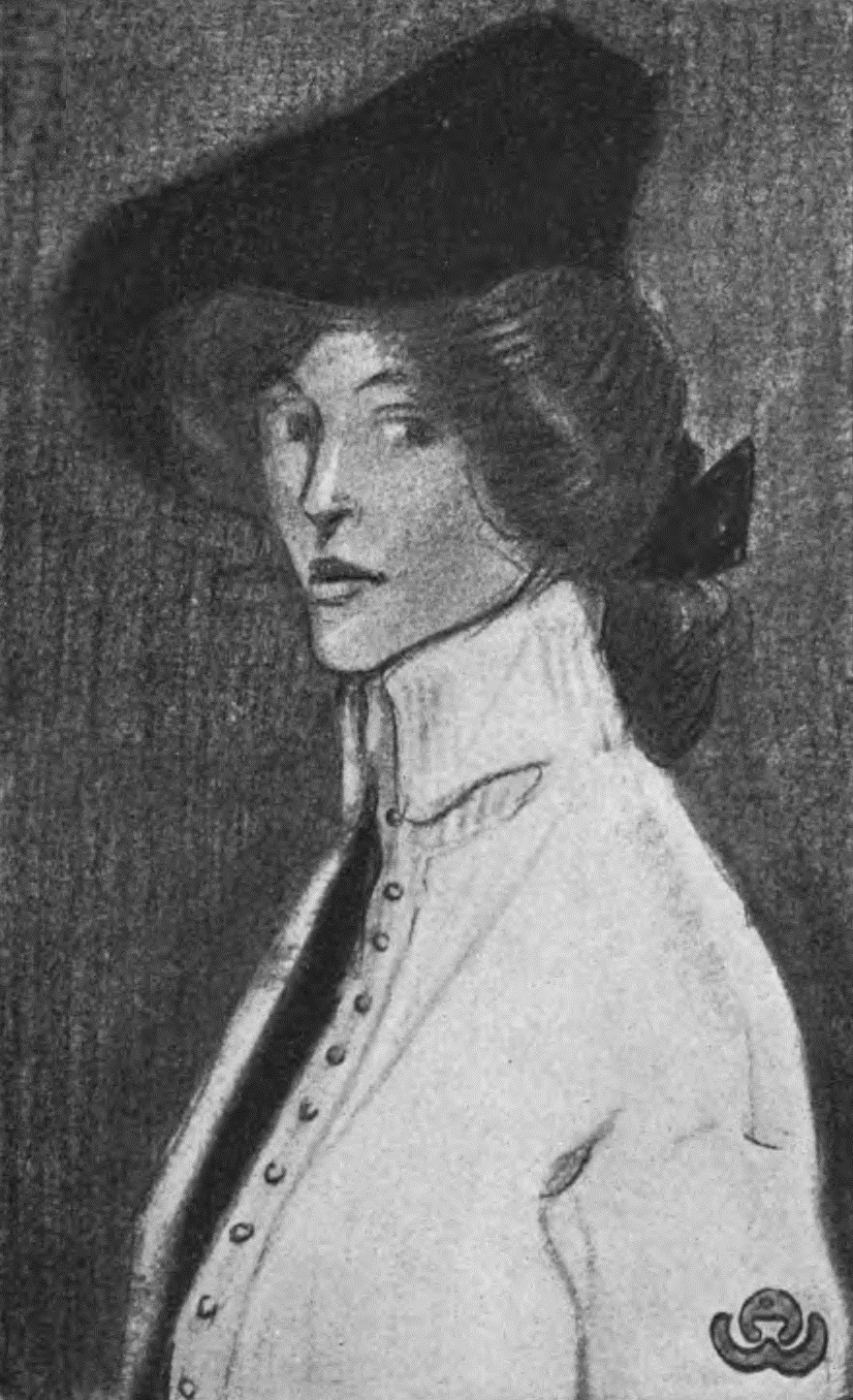
- Self-portrait
- Born: Alice Newton Woods; November 22, 1871; Goshen, Indiana, U.S.
- Died: July 24, 1959 (aged 87); New York City, U.S.
- Known for: Painting; Writing
- Spouse: Eugene Paul Ullman (m. 1903–1921)

Alice Newton Woods Ullman (November 22, 1871 – July 24, 1959) was an American painter, illustrator, and writer.

== Life and career ==
Ullman was born in Goshen, Indiana, the daughter of future federal judge William Allen Woods. She received her earliest education at the Girls Classical School of Indianapolis. In the mid-1890s she studied art at the second Indiana School of Art in Indianapolis, following this with a stint at the Shinnecock Hills Summer School of Art, run by William Merritt Chase in 1891. From 1897 to 1898 she was at the Art Students League of New York, and from 1898 to 1903 she was at the New York School of Art; she also spent time in Paris at the Académie Colarossi and Académie Carmen. When in Paris she rented a large studio for herself in order to work from home - during this time she met and became friends with Mina Loy who was also studying in Paris. Her instructors included Chase, T. C. Steele, and William Forsyth. While in Paris she came to know Margaret Cravens, Gertrude Stein, Ezra Pound, and other members of the American expatriate arts community.

From 1903 to 1921 Ullman was married to the artist Eugene Paul Ullman, with whom she had two sons, sculptor Allen and artist Paul. The couple married in Paris and lived abroad, but after their separation she returned to the United States, where from 1917 until 1925 she was active in Provincetown, Massachusetts. There she befriended Eugene O'Neill, at whose wedding to Agnes Boulton she would serve as the sole witness. She exhibited widely after her return, largely in Indiana, and belonged to a number of organizations including the National Association of Women Painters and Sculptors and the National Arts Club. Ullman wrote and illustrated six books dealing with women's liberation between 1902 and 1927; one of these, the 1912 novel Fame Seekers, was based on her time as a student in Paris. She also contributed short pieces to such magazines as The Century, McClure's, Pearson's, The Smart Set, and others.

Ullman died in New York City.

== Works ==
=== Novels ===
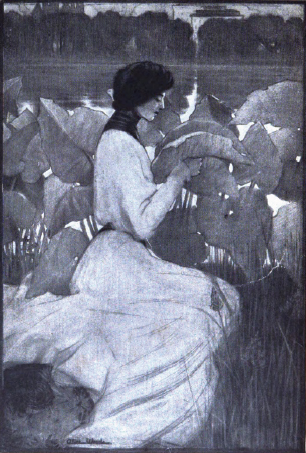
The frontispiece of her 1904 novel, A Gingham Rose was her own creation.

- Edges (1902)
- A Gingham Rose (1904)
- Fame Seekers (1912)
- The Thicket (1913)
- The Hairpin Duchess (1924)
- The Gilded Caravan (1927)

from

=== Plays ===
- The Devil's Glow (1918)
