= Clifford Addams =

American painter and etcher

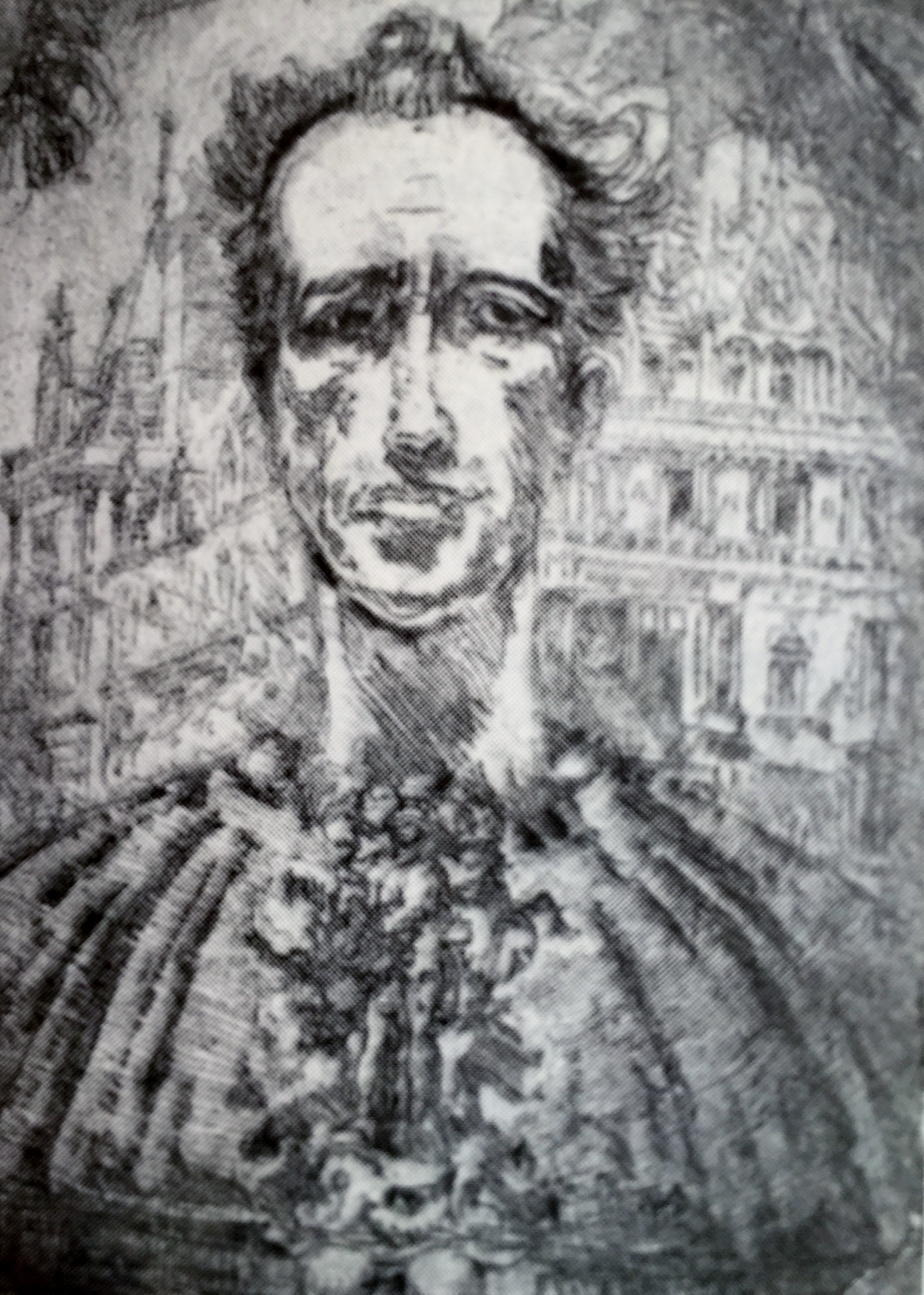
Etching: Self-Portrait (1927)

Clifford Isaac Addams (May 25, 1876 – November 7, 1942) was an American painter and etcher, and a protégé of James McNeill Whistler.

== Biography ==
Addams was born in Woodbury, New Jersey, the son of Quaker wool merchant Wellington Isaac Addams and Sarah Neff Addams. He had an older brother Robert and a younger sister Florence.

Addams studied architecture at the Drexel Institute, then attended the Pennsylvania Academy of the Fine Arts. He won an 1899 traveling scholarship from PAFA, which enabled him to study in Europe. The prior year, Whistler opened an art school in Paris—the Académie Carmen, operated by the artist's former model, Carmen Rossi. Addams enrolled, and became a favored pupil of the celebrated artist.

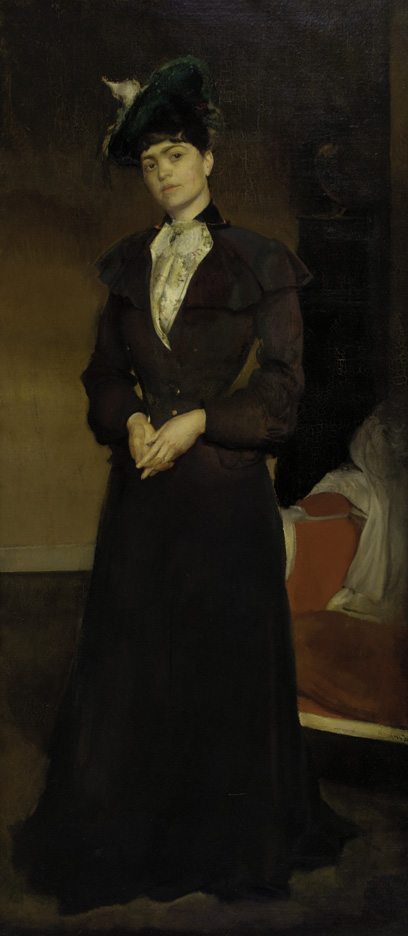
Portrait of Inez Eleanor Bate (1906), Pennsylvania Academy of the Fine Arts

Addams met fellow student Inez Eleanor Bate, and they married in London on June 27, 1900. They helped to run the school and care for Whistler, who was in failing health. After the school closed its doors in 1901, the couple settled in London. They had four children: Dianne (b. 1901) – Whistler was her godfather, twins James and Anthony (b. 1904), and Martin (b. ). Addams painted portraits and figure works, and made etchings of London and other European cities. He served in the Royal Navy from 1914 to 1919, during World War I. In 1920, he separated from his wife and family, citing her "extreme cruelty" in divorce proceedings. He returned to the United States, while she raised their children in Hendon, London. He settled in the Greenwich Village section of Lower Manhattan, where he died in 1942.

=== Painter ===
John Sloan commented on one of the works Addams exhibited at PAFA's 1907 annual exhibition: "Clifford Addams is a theme of interest. His nude in the show is a fine thing. If Whistler had done it, it would be a great Whistler." After meeting him, Sloan wrote: "Clifford Addams seems to be not at all the weird eccentric we have heard him described during the last six years. Either he has changed or Dame Rumor is a liar, the last most likely."

Addams exhibited sporadically at PAFA from 1907 and 1937. His Odalisque, exhibited in 1913, is fully clothed and coolly appraises the viewer. His At Play, a scene of a young woman in a kimono playing with a pet bird, was a traditionalist subject, but Addams painted it with modernist brushwork. It was exhibited at the Corcoran Gallery of Art in 1922, at PAFA in 1923, and at the National Academy of Design in 1924, where it was awarded the Thomas B. Clark Prize (best figure work by an American artist painted in the United States). PAFA awarded him its 1925 Temple Gold Medal for Washington Square, New York.

The Clark Galleries in Manhattan hosted a one-man show of Addams's works in April 1910. The Arlington Galleries in Manhattan hosted a one-man show of his works in December 1923.

Addams exhibited five oil portraits (including a self-portrait), two war sketches, and a watercolor at the 1926 Sesqui-Centennial Exposition in Philadelphia.

In 1928, Addams completed five murals for the City Council Chamber of City Hall in Asheville, North Carolina. "These depict the story of the Indians and the early white settlers."

His paintings are in the collections of the Pennsylvania Academy of the Fine Arts, the Art Institute of Chicago and private collections.

=== Etcher ===
Addams was a superb draftsman, and became a master etcher, manipulating his copper plates with variated inkings and wipings. Etchings such as An Obscure Turning, Venice come in daylight and night time versions, depending upon how Addams chose to apply the inks. He visited Venice for the first time in 1913, and had a triumphant London exhibition of the resulting etchings in Spring 1914. He joined the Royal Navy later that year, and sketches he made during his service were adapted into etchings of ships and naval battles, after the war.

Addams's exhibition of 46 etchings at the 1915 Panama–Pacific International Exposition in San Francisco was awarded a bronze medal. The Baltimore Museum of Art hosted a one-man show of his paintings and etchings in 1923. He exhibited 50 etchings at the 1926 Sesqui-Centennial Exposition in Philadelphia.

His etchings are in the collections of the Metropolitan Museum of Art, the National Gallery of Art, the Smithsonian American Art Museum, and other museums. A posthumous exhibition of his etchings and drypoints was held at a London art gallery in 1984.

== Selected works ==
=== Paintings ===
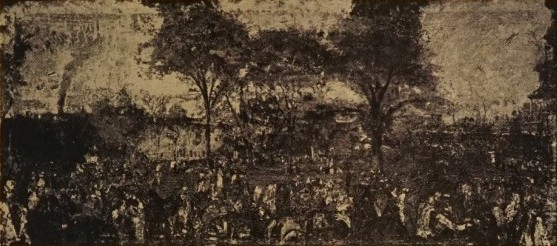
Washington Square, New York (c.1925), unlocated

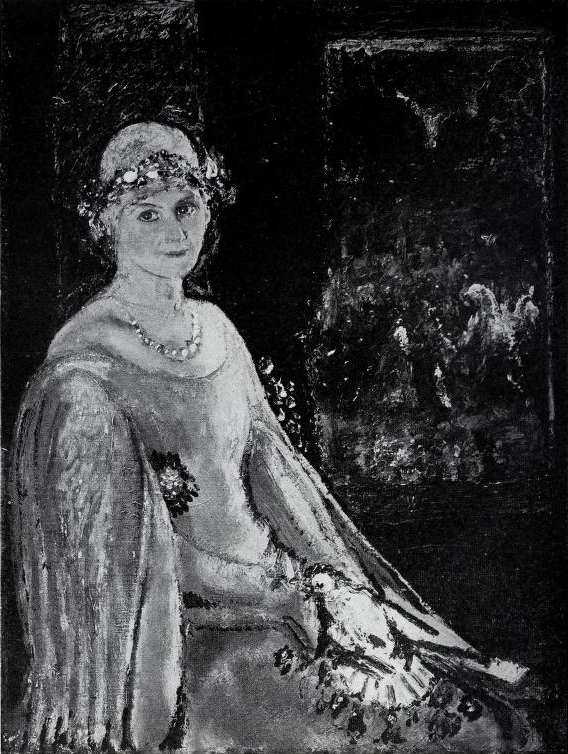
The Black Rosette (c.1926), unlocated

- Cottage in Wales (c.1900), watercolor, Art Institute of Chicago
- Inez Eleanor Bate: Portrait of the Artist's Wife (1906), Pennsylvania Academy of the Fine Arts
- View in Surrey (c.1910), unlocated. Exhibited at the Royal Society of British Artists
- Decoration (c.1912), Pennsylvania Academy of the Fine Arts
- Odalisque (c.1913), unlocated
- At Play (c.1922), unlocated
- Bohemienne (c.1922), unlocated. Awarded the Art Institute of Chicago's 1922 Harris Silver Medal
- Tranquility (c.1923), unlocated
- Washington Square, New York (c.1925), unlocated. Awarded PAFA's 1925 Temple Gold Medal
- Self-Portrait (c.1926), unlocated. Exhibited at the 1926 Sesqui-Centennial Exposition
- The Black Rosette (c.1926), unlocated. Exhibited at the 1926 Sesqui-Centennial Exposition
- Union Square (c.1928), unlocated

=== Etchings ===
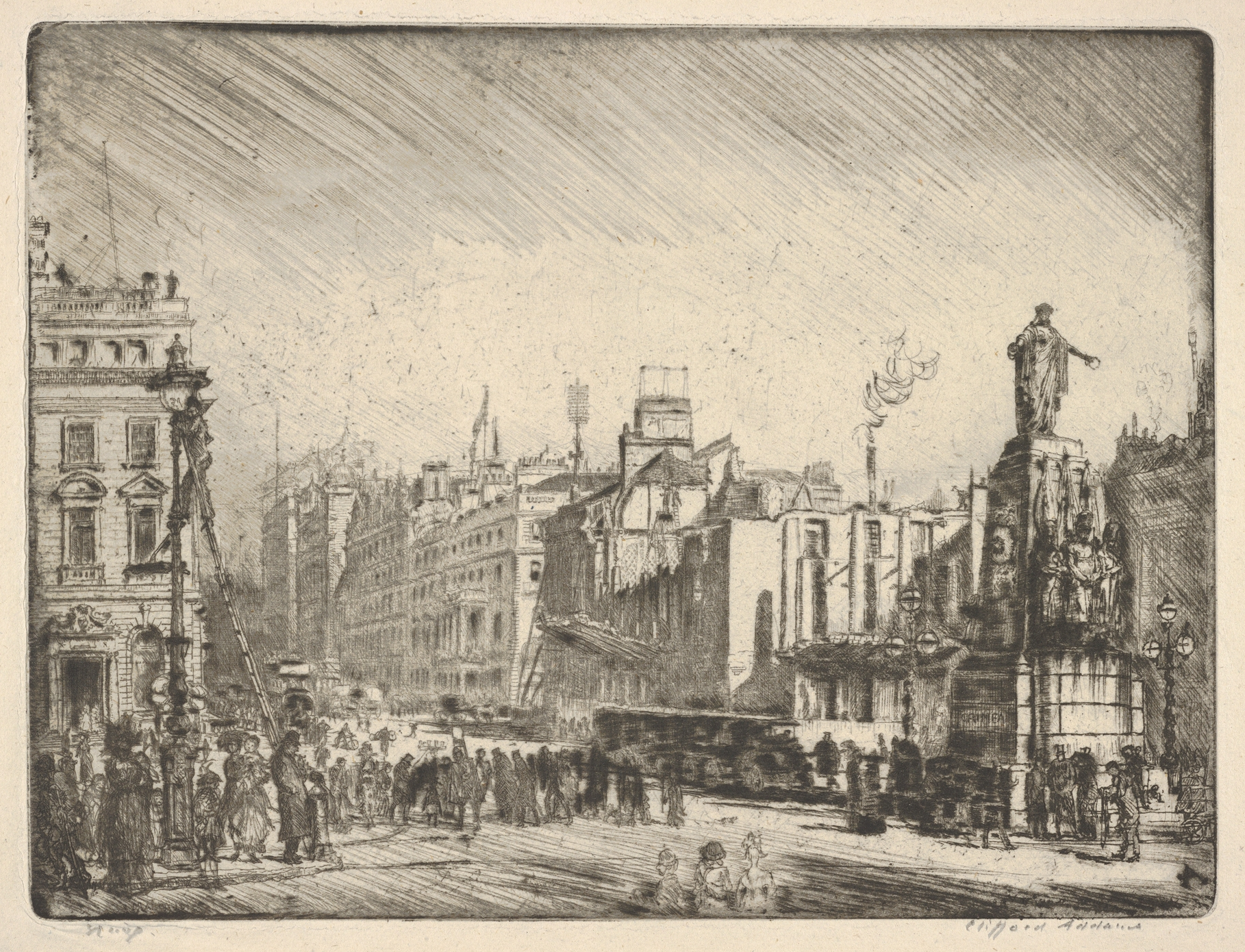
Etching: Waterloo Place (1912)

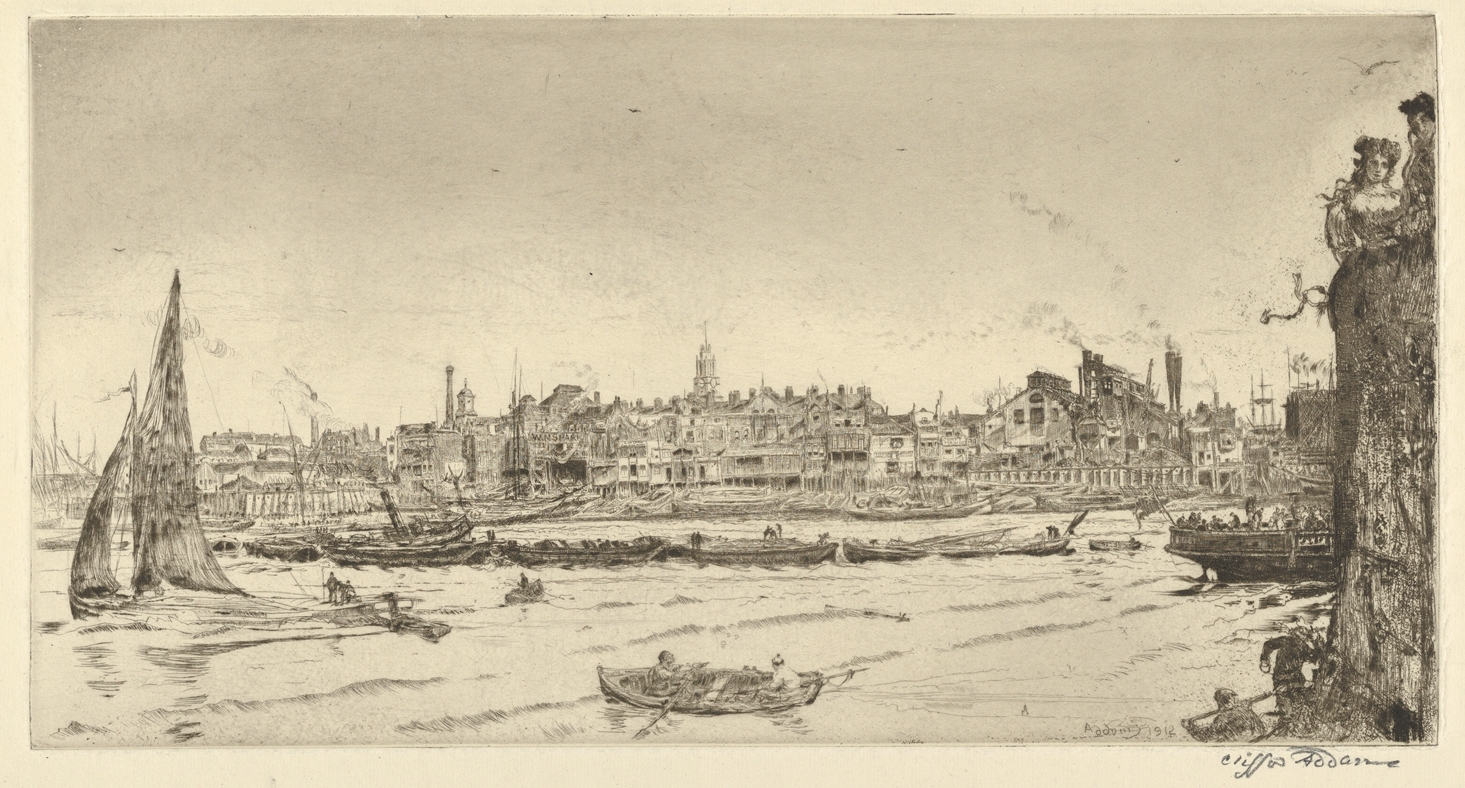
Etching: Limehouse (c.1912)

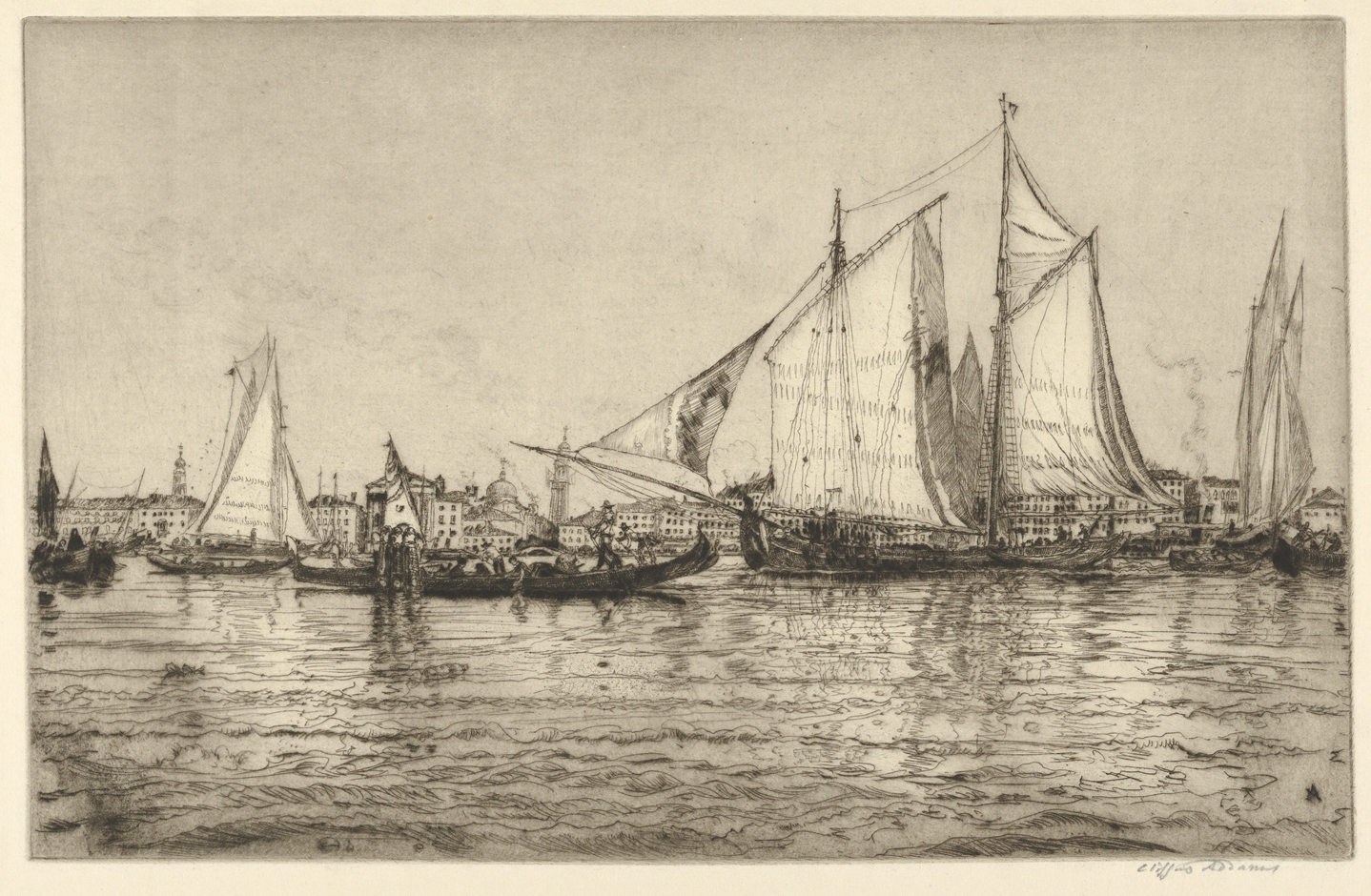
Etching: Venetian Craft (c.1913)

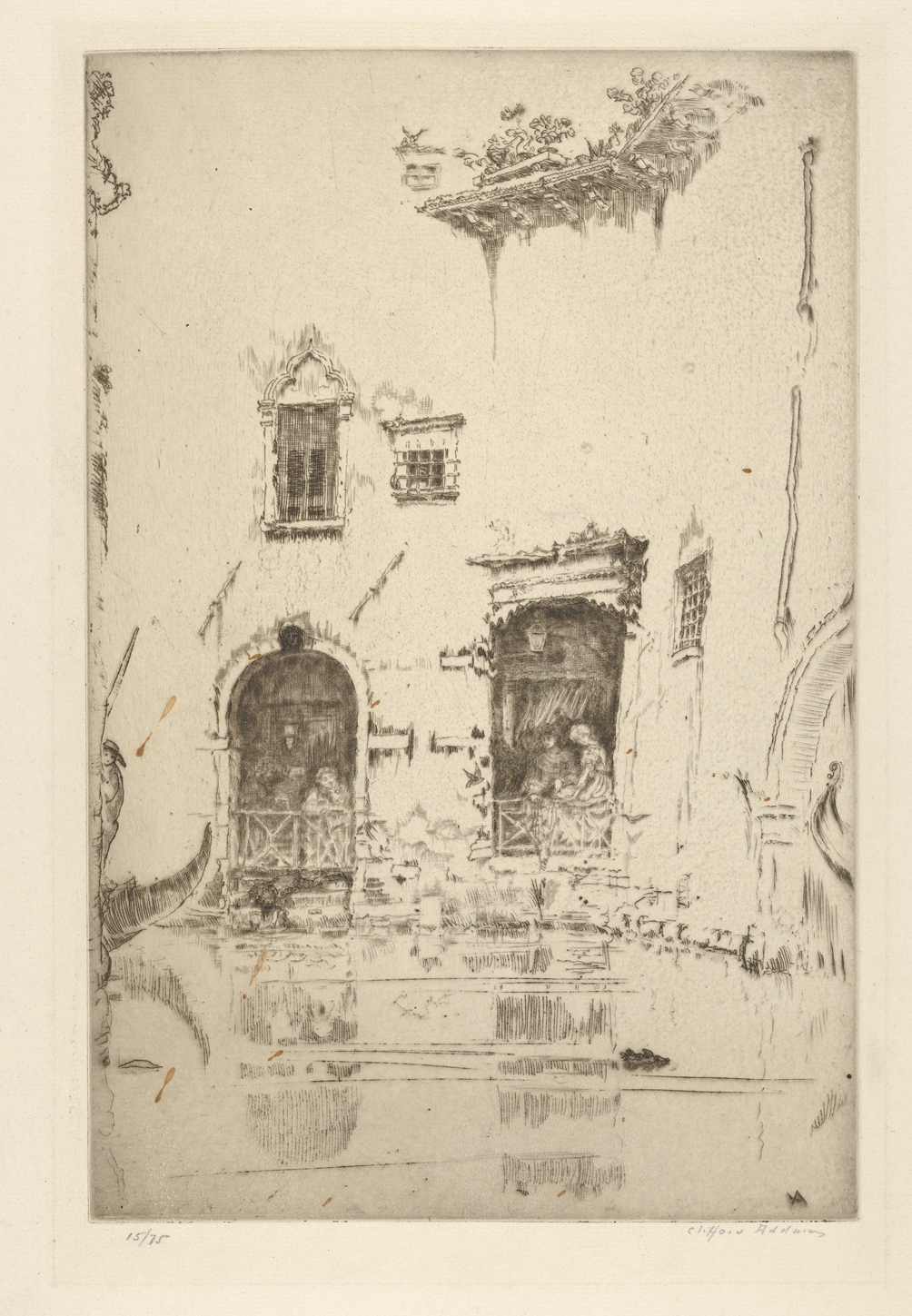
Etching: An Obscure Turning, Venice (c.1914)

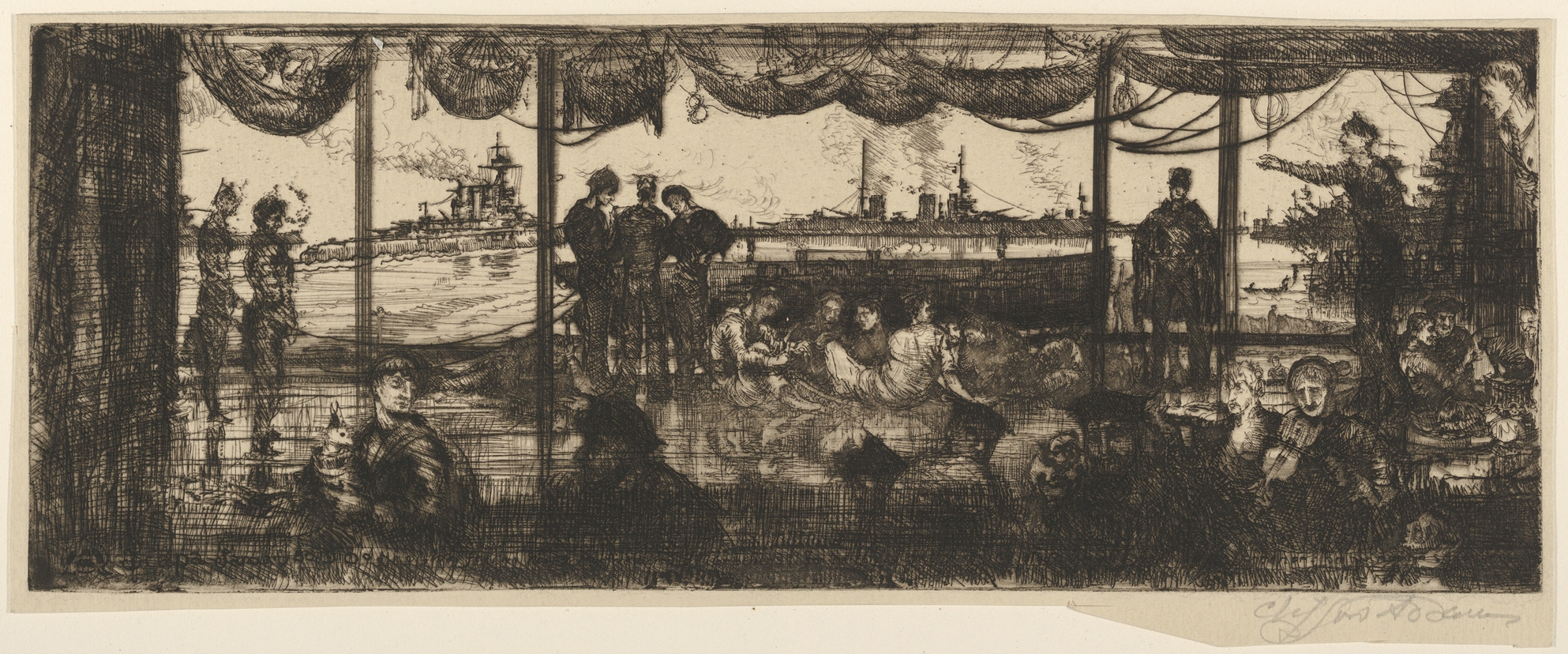
Etching: On Deck, HMS Princess Royal (c.1920)
