= By the Fireside (Hubbell) =

Painting by Henry Salem Hubbell

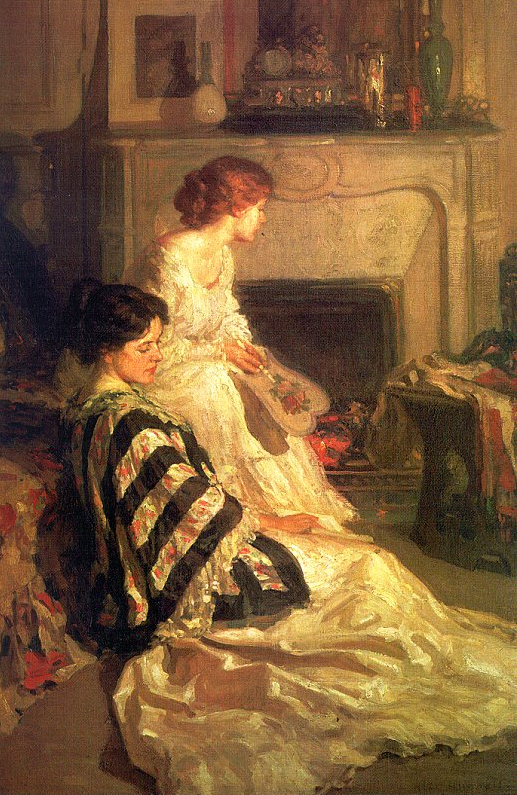
- Artist: Henry Salem Hubbell
- Year: 1908
- Medium: oil on canvas
- Dimensions: 210.185 cm × 149.225 cm (82.750 in × 58.750 in)
- Owner: Liberty Memorial Middle School (Lawrence, KS)

By the Fireside is a painting by American impressionist Henry Salem Hubbell, completed in 1908. Hubbell painted the work while living in Giverny, France as a part of the American Impressionism movement that had taken up residence there, alongside Claude Monet. The models for the painting were Marjory Gane and Grace Southwick, two acquaintances of Hubbell's who visited Giverny during the winter of 1908 to 1909. It displays Hubbell's Impressionistic use of loose brushstrokes and masterful colorwork in an appreciable evolution from his first known painting, Mother and Child after W. Bouguereau.

The painting premiered at the 1909 Paris Salon, receiving critical acclaim. While learning under James Whistler, his teacher had stated that "one day you will be called a great colorist," and the Paris press agreed that Hubbell had reached that pinacle with this work.

By the Fireside was one of Hubbell's favorite works, and he kept it for himself during his lifetime. A year before his death, he donated the painting in 1948 to his high school in Lawrence, Kansas, now Liberty Memorial Central Middle School, "to inspire future growth of the arts" there.
