= Emmi Walther =

German painter (1860–1936)

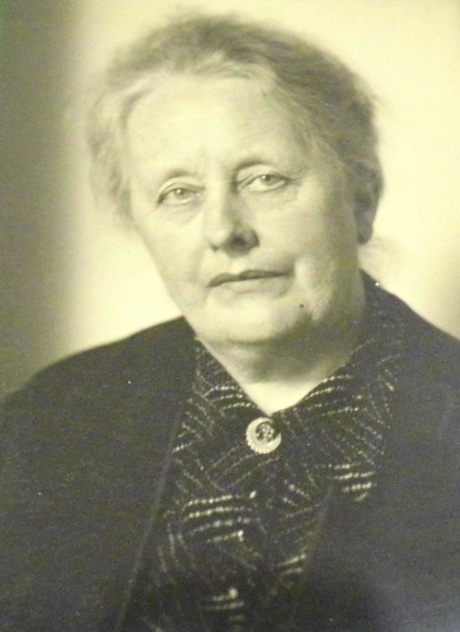
Emmi Walther (date unknown) The Jack Daulton Collection, Los Altos Hills, California.

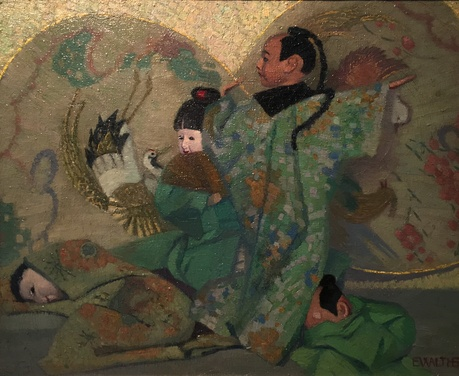
Japanese Dolls, oil on canvas, 35.5 x 44 cm, The Jack Daulton Collection, Los Altos Hills, California.

Emmi Louise Walther (30 October 1860 – 11 September 1936) was a German painter, graphic artist and watercolorist. Most of her works are in the Art Nouveau or Symbolist styles.

== Biography ==
She was born in Hamburg to a middle-class family and received her first art training from the landscape painter Friedrich Schwinge. Later, she studied in Hannover, but did not become seriously interested in an artistic career until she was thirty. In 1896, she went to Munich, where she enrolled in the private painting school operated by Ludwig Schmid-Reutte.

After completing her studies there, she moved to the artists' colony at Dachau and worked with Adolf Hölzel. While there, she became friends with Emil Nolde and travelled to Paris with him, by way of Amsterdam, where she took classes at the short-lived Académie Carmen; making friends with Alphonse Mucha, Paula Becker and Clara Westhoff. After 1900, she spent time at the artists' colonies in Concarneau and Worpswede, staying with Becker, who had married the painter Otto Modersohn.

After 1916, she became a permanent resident of Dachau. Three years later, she was one of the founding members of the Künstlervereinigung Dachau (Artists' Association), which still exists. Walther died in Dachau in 1936. A street there has been named after her.

== Writings ==
- Heimat der Seele (Home of the Soul) – Stimmungen in Wort u. Bild, 1922, Kostanz, R. Walther und Leipzig, H. G. Wallmann
- Von Tag zu Tage (From Day to Day) – Stimmungen in Wort u. Bild, 1925, Kostanz, R. Walther
