= Friedrich Schwinge =

German painter

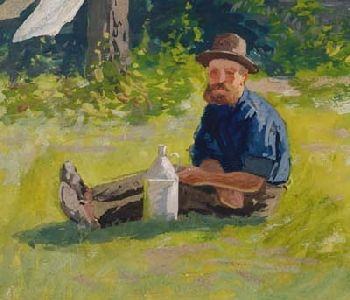
Self-portrait in the Garden

Friedrich Wilhelm Andreas Schwinge (30 March 1852, Hamburg - 22 October 1913, Hamburg) was a German landscape and seascape painter; associated with the Düsseldorfer Malerschule.

== Biography ==
He was born to Hermann Diedrich Schwinge, a greengrocer, and his wife, Caroline Maria Dorothea née Hansen. After completing his primary education, he served an apprenticeship as a Woodcutter. He was unable to find suitable work, so he sang and acted in small parts at theaters in Kiel. During his free time, he practiced painting and drawing; copying artworks at the local museum. Later, some of this was done on commission. In 1879, the quality of his work led to his being presented with a stipendium, to cover the cost of formal lessons.

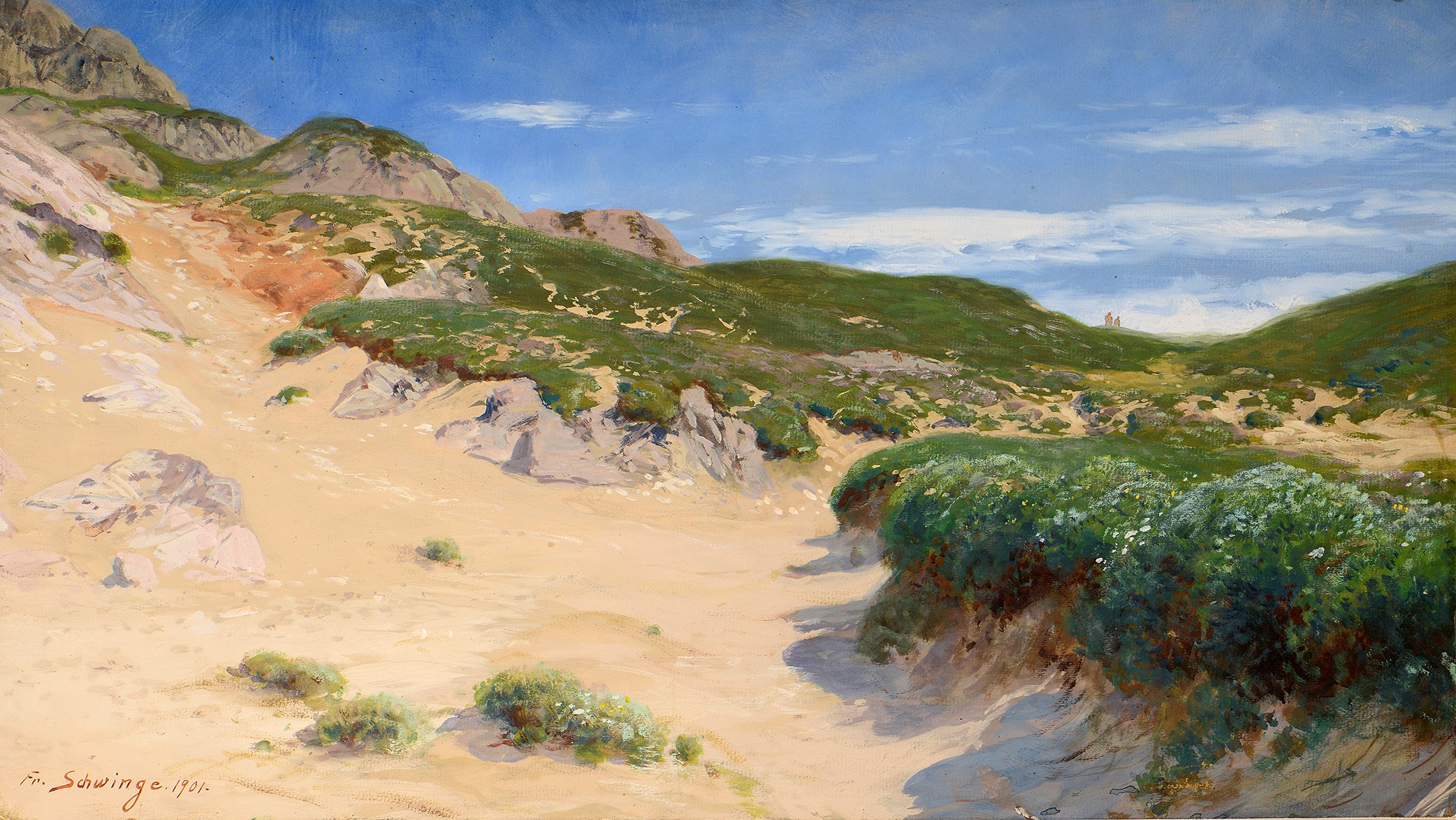
Landscape with Dunes

From 1879 to 1884, he was enrolled at the Kunstakademie Düsseldorf, where he studied with Johann Peter Theodor Janssen, Eugen Dücker, Hugo Crola and Heinrich Lauenstein. While there, he was awarded an additional scholarship. He sold his first painting at an exhibition in 1882. After graduating, he returned to Hamburg. In 1886, he married the widow, Fernanda Georgine Wilhelmine Brügmann, née Durchbach. She had a son from her first marriage, and they had a son together; Kurt, who would become an amateur filmmaker.

Also in 1886, the Kunstverein in Hamburg bought several of his watercolors for their annual raffle. They would do so again on several occasions. He became a member in 1896, and was elected to their governing committee the following year. The year 1897 also saw the creation of one of his largest projects: a series of dioramas for the "Vegetationshalle" at the Internationale Gartenbauausstellung (International Horticultural Exhibition), held at Hamburg's Planten un Blomen park. They were called the "Vegetationsgalerie", consisting of ten scenes with natural foregrounds and painted backgrounds. He was assisted by the panoramic landscape artist, Robert Gleich (1855-1928), and the sculptor, Max Meißner (1859–1942).

He began to have marital difficulties in 1898, after Fernanda's son, Edgar, died at the age of twenty-three. The divorce was finalized in 1904. A few months later, he married Martha Christine Margarethe Hüttmann, the daughter of a coal dealer, who was twenty-five years his junior.

In August, 1913, as many as twenty of his paintings were stolen from the Alsterthor Art Salon. Shortly after, the police apprehended a former servant of the salon's owner, who was in possession of three paintings. He had already sold two, but refused to make a statement about any of the others that were missing. He was apparently responsible for several other smaller thefts involving Schwinge's paintings that had occurred over the previous months. In October, Schwinge died of a heart attack. There has been some speculation that it was stress-induced.

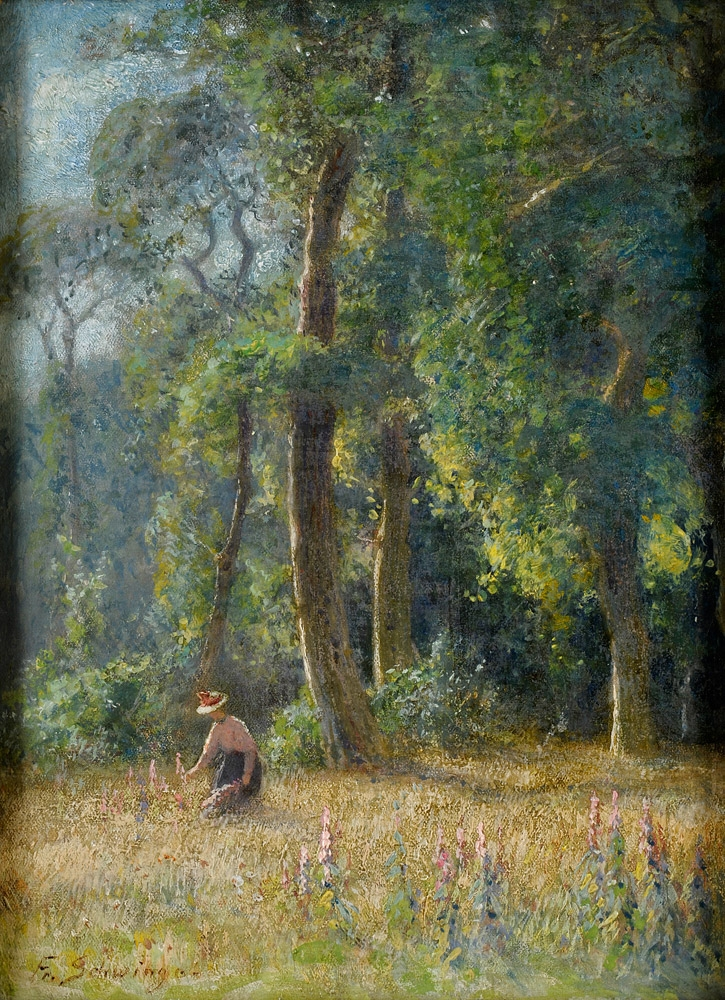
The Flower Meadow

A memorial exhibition and sale was held the following month. The borough of Altona purchased a statue of a shepherd that was intended for his grave, and placed it in a city park. A street in Hamburg's Groß Flottbek district was named after him. In addition to his painting, he accepted some students; mostly schoolgirls. A few would become well known, such as Clarita Beyer, Helene Lübbers-Wegemann, Emmi Walther, and Mary Warburg.
