= Lillian Genth =

American artist (1876–1953)

- Born: 1876; Philadelphia, Pennsylvania, U.S.
- Died: March 28, 1953 (aged 76); New York City, U.S.
- Education: Philadelphia School of Design for Women
- Occupation: Artist
- Parent(s): Samuel Adam; Matilda Caroline Rebscher

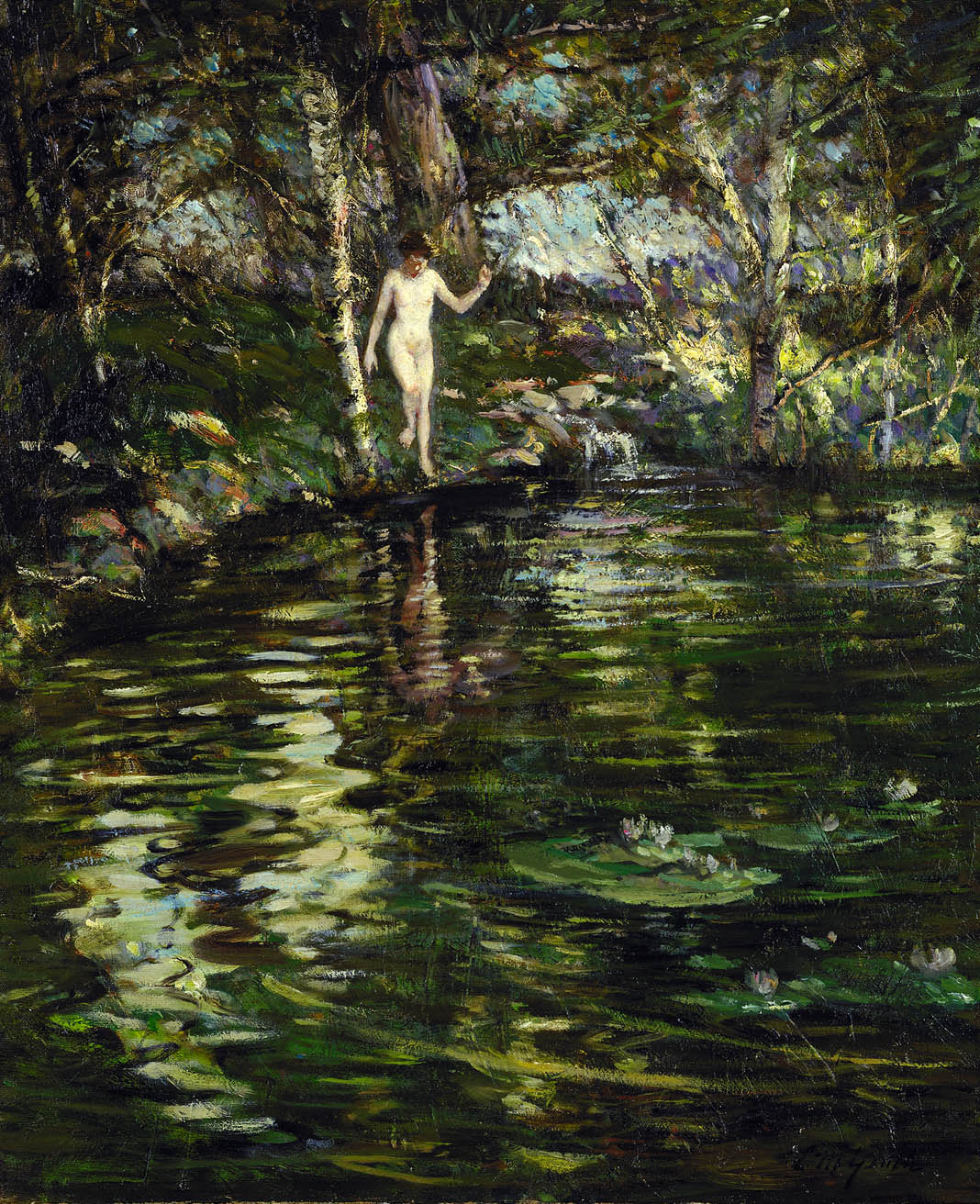
Depths of the Woods (1900–1910) at the Smithsonian American Art Museum

Lillian Mathilde Genth (1876 – March 28, 1953) was an American impressionist artist. She is best known for her depiction of female nudes in landscape settings. However, in the middle of her career she swore off painting female nudes and began painting more conservative paintings inspired by her travels. In about 30 years Genth appeared in 233 exhibitions, and while well renowned for her paintings while alive, her story and artwork have been lost in the retelling of American art history.

== Early life and education ==
Lillian Mathilde Genth was born in Philadelphia, Pennsylvania, the daughter of Matilda Caroline Rebscher and Samuel Adam. Genth began her art career by attending the Philadelphia School of Design for Women in Pennsylvania on scholarship. During her schooling years she worked to help support herself as a dress designer. At the Philadelphia School of Design for Women her primary teacher was Elliott Daingerfield. Daingerfield greatly influenced her style, which can be seen in the similar tonalist and coloristic qualities of her landscape scenes. Genth graduated from Philadelphia School of Design for Women in 1900. She received the William L. Elkins European fellowship for attainment in art from the Philadelphia School of Design, which sponsored her to paint in Europe for a year.

== Early career ==
=== Paris, France ===
During her time in Europe, Genth first settled in Paris, France in October 1900 where she enrolled in art classes at the Académie Carmen, an art school run by James McNeill Whistler. Whistler became a large influence on Genth’s work and she was known to be a favorite pupil of his. During one of Whistler’s visits to the school in 1900, he was so impressed by Genth’s work that he gave her a paint palette; an honor that she used and treasured for the rest of her career. This was an incredible compliment from Whistler, who rarely accepted women painters.

Genth’s style is typically attributed to Whistler because of her paintings' tonalist qualities and because he taught her to see her paintings as a whole instead of in individual parts. After the Academie Carmen closed in 1901, Genth stayed in Europe for three more years. During this time she worked on painting landscapes, genre scenes, and waterfronts; her nudes would not begin for a few more years.

=== New York ===
In 1904 Genth returned to the United States and was living in New York City. It was at this point that her career began to flourish. In 1904 Genth showed at three exhibitions: the National Academy of Design, Art Club of Philadelphia, and Worcester Museum. In October of that same year she appeared in her first individual show at the Pennsylvania Academy of Fine Arts. Also in 1904 Genth received the Mary Shaw Prize for the best landscape in the show for her work Peasant Houses, Normandy at an exhibition at the Pennsylvania Academy of Fine Arts. Critics and the general public began noticing and appreciating Genth’s work during this beneficial year.

Through the next couple of years Genth continued to show at the nation’s most important art galleries, museums, and art clubs. In 1906 Genth developed her interest in the female nude. She quit drawing her European-inspired landscapes and focused on the female form. She quickly developed skills in drawing the nude female form and established her style that depicts nude females in landscape settings. When Genth was asked why she changed her form she responded, “Because to me the most beautiful thing in the world is the human figure outdoors. In Brittany, one day I took a model out and posed her in the open and I was at once filled with resentment at all the beauty I had been missing.”

The conservative Victorian society was not ready to accept Genth’s nude figures and at first her paintings were often rejected by exhibitions and advisors told her to abandon her new iconography. However, Genth, known for her fierce personality, persevered through these setbacks. In 1908 her painting, The Lark, won her the Shaw Memorial Prize at the 83rd Annual Exhibition of the National Academy of Design. The Lark depicts a full female nude strolling through the woods with her head turned looking toward the sky as if she just heard a lark, as the title suggests. This painting successfully demonstrates Whistler’s influence on Genth through the integration of the nude form and the landscape. The success of the painting relies on the focus of the painting as a whole to make the nude form grounded in the landscape instead of looking out of place.

Also in 1908, Genth was elected into the National Academy of Design as an Associate. She was the youngest woman ever elected to this position at the academy. From 1910 until 1929 Genth appeared in at least 164 exhibitions. During these years she experienced a lot of success, popularity, and wealth. She split her time between her two residences; one is an apartment in New York City, and the other is a large estate in the Berkshire Mountains in Connecticut, which she named Hermitcliff. Hermitcliff was an estate of 70 acres of woodland and it was here that Genth was able to paint her models uninterrupted. She loved coming to Hermitcliff and used it well throughout the years. She said about her beloved estate, “The things I have learned have come from the soil in the depths of my woods in Connecticut.”

After overcoming preliminary obstacles and achieving success in her nude forms, Genth began exploring other art forms.

== Late career ==
On August 12, 1928, Genth announced that she would no longer paint female nudes. She released a press release that said: “Miss Genth begs to announce that she has definitely discontinued painting nudes. In the future, she will devote herself to Spanish and Oriental themes exclusively.”

Genth's reasoning to stop painting nudes is still a mystery, although several of her friends revealed that Genth had become very religious. They said her new friends of the church convinced her to stop painting her nude figures. However, these accounts go against Genth’s strong-willed and determined personality. She was not the type of woman so succumb to accepted societal norms, as seen in her earlier career when she persevered with her nude paintings.

=== Spain ===
Throughout the 1920s Genth made multiple trips to Spain and became enamored with the sun and culture of the exotic country. She wrote an article on her travels throughout Spain called “Castles in Spain” in which she wrote, “No one knows the glamour of Spain unless you have lived there—the glorious sunlight and flowers.” Between 1926 and 1927 she traveled throughout Spain. Her paintings from this time show her passion and admiration for Spanish culture and include images of powerful women. Her paintings use vibrant colors and portray her women as strong, beautiful, and courageous.

One of her most famous paintings from this time is Las Abanicas, which depicts four women in brightly colored garments participating in the Seville Fair, a festival in Sevilla, Spain. The painting consists of many patterns, colors, and brushstrokes coming together to create a beautiful and bright composition. Another aspect of Spanish culture that intrigued Genth was bullfighting and she created two notable paintings surrounding this theme: La Novia del Torero and Bull Fight.

=== North Africa ===
During her 1926 travels, Genth also stopped in North Africa to paint in the major cities. Genth was a curious woman and determined to find new and interesting subjects to paint and explore. She travelled alone and carried all of her materials and paintings with her and her time in North Africa was short but hectic. The art she made during these travels depicted a variety of different scenes of everyday life and portraits of the local women. In Genth’s own article “A Painting Trip in North Africa” she writes about stories from the trip and the experiences and hardships painting on the road. She discusses the vibrant markets and the foreign culture, but mainly describes the beautiful yet unique colors of the cities.

=== The Orient ===
In 1931 Genth returned from a trip to Asia and announced that she would cease painting European and African subjects and focus on the Orient. When asked her reasoning, she simply said, “People live in cycles”. One of the main reasons for her trip was a commission from King Pradjadhipok, the King of Siam.

Genth first stopped in Japan to watch and paint sumo wrestling. While in Japan she also painted a series of Tokyo cityscapes, one of the most notable paintings being Theatre Street, Tokyo.

Genth then travelled to Hong Kong, China where she painted Hong Kong at night, a beautiful painting that contrasts the light and dark of the city from afar.

Next Genth travelled to Siam, which is present day Thailand, to paint for the king. In Bangkok, Thailand she created the painting, The Royal Barge, which depicts the king and his boats during the Water Festival.

Genth’s favorite stop in Asia was Papua because the island was very remote and fairly untouched by outsiders; a ship had not landed there in over four years. In Papua she painted Papuan Wedding (Port Morsby), which captures a vibrant marriage ceremony with strokes of earth tones.

After Papua she traveled to Fiji, Bali, and Pago-Pago before returning to New York City.

== Later years and death ==
Genth lived the rest of her life in New York City and showed in a few more exhibitions during the 1930s, but her shows became increasingly less frequent. In her later years she was driven to upstate New York every fall to witness the leaves change and painted small landscape sketches.

She died on March 28, 1953, at her home in New York City at age 76.

== Collections ==
Genth's work is held in the permanent collections of many institutions, including the Hickory Museum of Art, the Frye Art Museum, the New Britain Museum of American Art, the University of Michigan Museum of Art, the Cheekwood Estate and Gardens, the Salisbury House, and the Smithsonian American Art Museum.
