= Leandro Ramón Garrido =

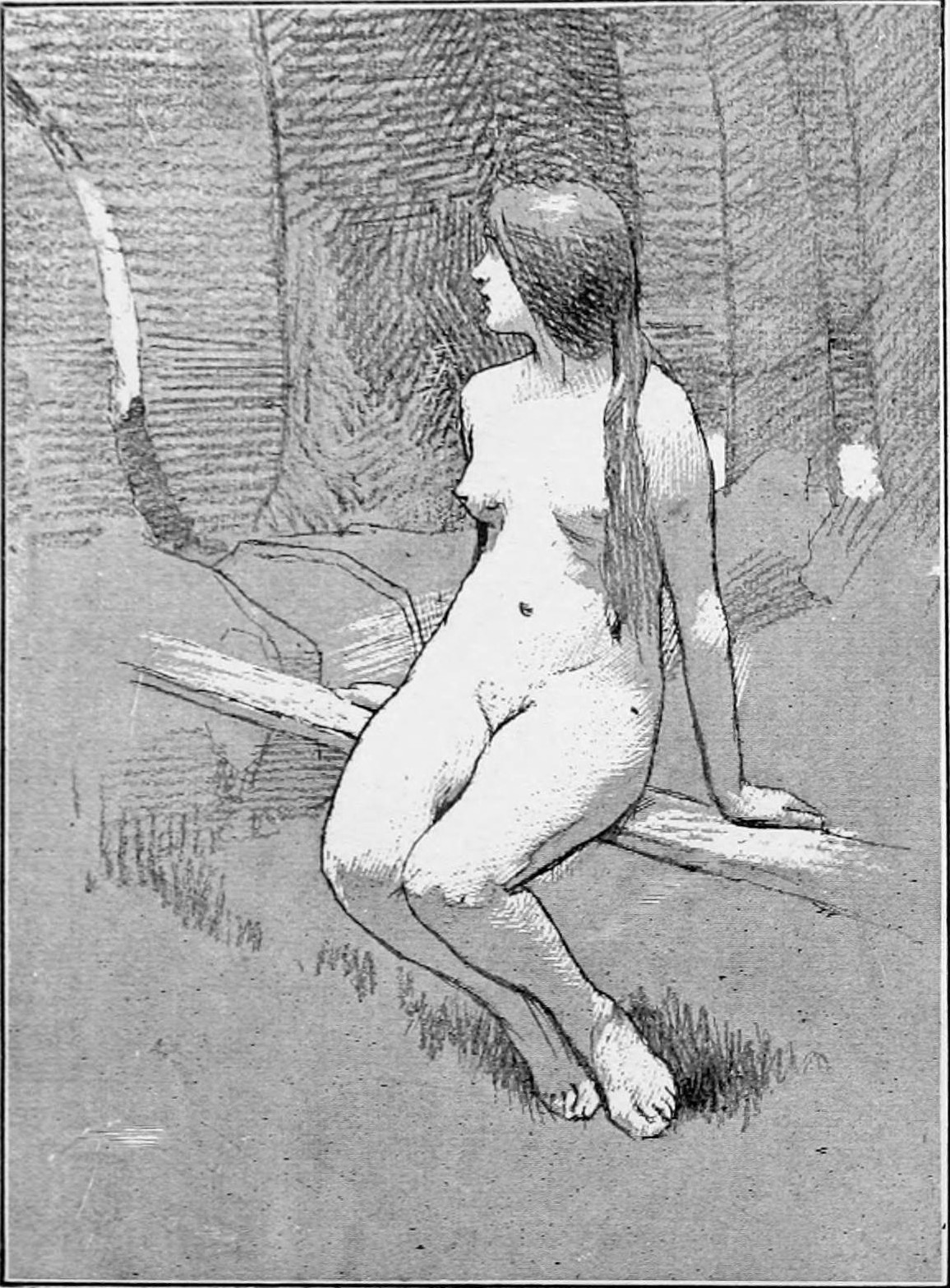
Le Soir (1894) by Leandro Ramon Garrido

Leandro Ramón Garrido, also known as Leandro Garrido (1868–1909) was an English–Spanish painter born in France. He was known for his Costumbrismo paintings, literary or pictorial interpretation of local everyday life.

== History ==
He was born 27 September 1868 in Bayonne, France, to an English mother, Elizabeth Allsop and a Spanish father, Fernando Garrido. Garrido spent his childhood in Paris and later Great Britain. He studied painting in Paris with Gustave-Claude-Etienne Courtois and Paul-Elie Delaunay.

His work is found in many public art collections including Victoria and Albert Museum, Walker Art Gallery, Glasgow Museums Resource Centre (GMRC), Brighton and Hove Museums and Art Galleries, Musée d'Orsay, and Pannett Art Gallery in Whitby, England.

== Bibliography ==
- Quigley, Jane (1913). Leandro Ramon Garrido, His Life and Art. London, England: Duckworth and Company.
- Catalogue of the Beardsley-Garrido-Goff exhibition from December 12th, 1914, to January 9th, 1915. Brighton, England: The Dolphin Press. 1914.
