= Académie Carmen =

Former art school in Paris, France

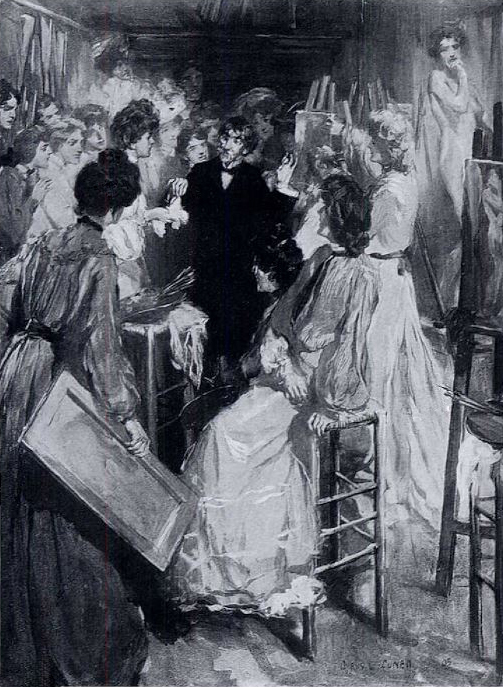
"He never had a more ardent lot of followers than the girl students; they adored him." (1906) by Cyrus Cuneo

Académie Carmen, also known as Whistler's School, was a short-lived Parisian art school founded by James McNeill Whistler. It operated from 1898 to 1901.

== History ==
The school opened in October 1898 in a large house and stable at No. 6 Passage Stanislas, near the Rue Notre Dame du Champs. The business side of the school was handled by Whistler's former model Carmen Rossi, for whom the school was named, and her musician husband. The number of students was limited to forty, most of whom were women. More than half of them were American, "with several also coming from England, Ireland, and Scotland." Instructors for the first year were Whistler (painting) and American sculptor Frederick William MacMonnies (life drawing). Whistler taught without pay as a "visiting professor," and appeared once a week to offer criticism.

Initially, all the students met in a single class. Whistler made his first appearance at the beginning of the second week, and, at his insistence, the students were separated into women's and men's classes. Experienced students were appointed teaching assistants. The women's class was led by Irish painter Inez Eleanor Bate for the length of the school's tenure. The men's class was led by a series of assistants—American painter Earl Stetson Crawford, Czech painter Alphonse Mucha, Italian painter Cyrus Cuneo, and lastly, American painter Clifford Addams. With a dearth of sculpture students, MacMonnies left after the first year.

In a 1906 magazine article, Cuneo described Whistler's eccentricities, his inability to communicate effectively as a teacher, and his strong favoritism toward the women's class: "Instead of sitting down in the usual French fashion and giving each pupil in turn a clear and matter-of-fact criticism, Whistler airily picked his way amongst the easels, glancing here and there, ignoring some canvases altogether, greeting others with 'Yes—yes.' " "Whistler's methods and manner confused the average students who came, but his faith in his system was as great as the students' unbelief." Despite the prestige of his fame and reputation, many of the students dropped out. The frustration of the male students was expressed in a poem Whistler found scrawled on a wall of the men's studio:

I bought a palette just like his,
His colours and his brush.
The devil of it is, you see,
I did not buy his touch.

The frustration turned to resentment in the second year. Whistler's apprentice Inez Eleanor Bate recalled: "[A]t the latter part of the season he often refused to criticize in the men's class at all. He would call sometimes on Sunday mornings [when the school was empty], and take out and place upon easels the various studies that had been done by the men the previous week, and often he would declare that nothing interested him among them and that he should not criticize that week, that he could not face the 'blankness' of the atelier." By the third year, the men's life class was cancelled due to lack of students.

Whistler was not always in good health, which may have accounted for many of his absences. His doctors recommended convalescence in a warmer climate, and he sent New Year's greetings for 1901 to the students from Corsica. The school continued to struggle, and descended into quarrels and mistrust. "In the end, the want of confidence in him, his illness, and his absence broke up the school." Whistler announced its closing in a letter sent from Corsica, and read aloud to the students on April 6, 1901.

Whistler's hopes of establishing an art school in London under the management of apprentices Inez Eleanor Bate and Clifford Addams, who married in 1900, were defeated by his continued poor health. He died in London on July 17, 1903, at age 69.

== Students ==
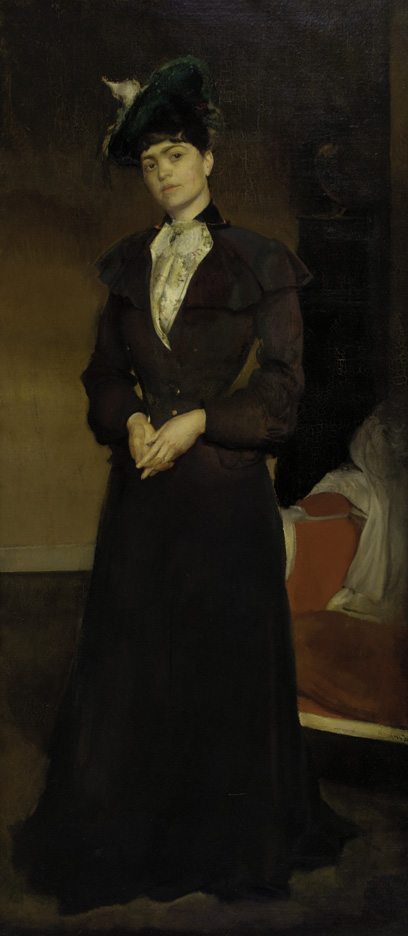
Inez Eleanor Bate (1906), by Clifford Addams

- Lucien Abrams United States
- Clifford Addams (tutor) United States
- Alice Pike Barney United States
- Frederic Clay Bartlett United States
- Inez Eleanor Bate (tutor) Ireland
- Carlotta Blaurock United States
- Simon Bussy France
- Blendon Reed Campbell United States
- Alson S. Clark United States
- Earl Stetson Crawford (tutor) United States
- Cyrus Cuneo (tutor) Italy
- Edward Dufner United States
- Mary Foote United States
- Frederick Carl Frieseke United States
- Louise Elizabeth Garden MacLeod England
- Lillian Genth United States
- Mary Hughitt Halliday United States
- Paul Henry Ireland
- Ilka Howells United States
- Henry Salem Hubbell United States
- Louise Williams Jackson United States
- John Christen Johansen Denmark
- Gwen John Wales
- Lydia Longacre United States
- Will Hicok Low United States
- Alphonse Mucha (tutor) Czechoslovakia
- Mary Augusta Mullikin United States
- Ida Nettleship England
- Anna Ostroumova-Lebedeva Russia
- Lawton S. Parker United States
- Ambrose McCarthy Patterson Canada
- Hugh Ramsay Australia
- Gwen Salmond England
- William Otis Swett United States
- Nell Marion Tenison England
- Eugene Paul Ullman United States
- Mary van der Veer United States
- Hans Albrecht von Harrach Germany
- Marie von Rietgenstein Germany
- Emmi Walther Germany
- Charles Henry White Canada
- Alice Woods United States
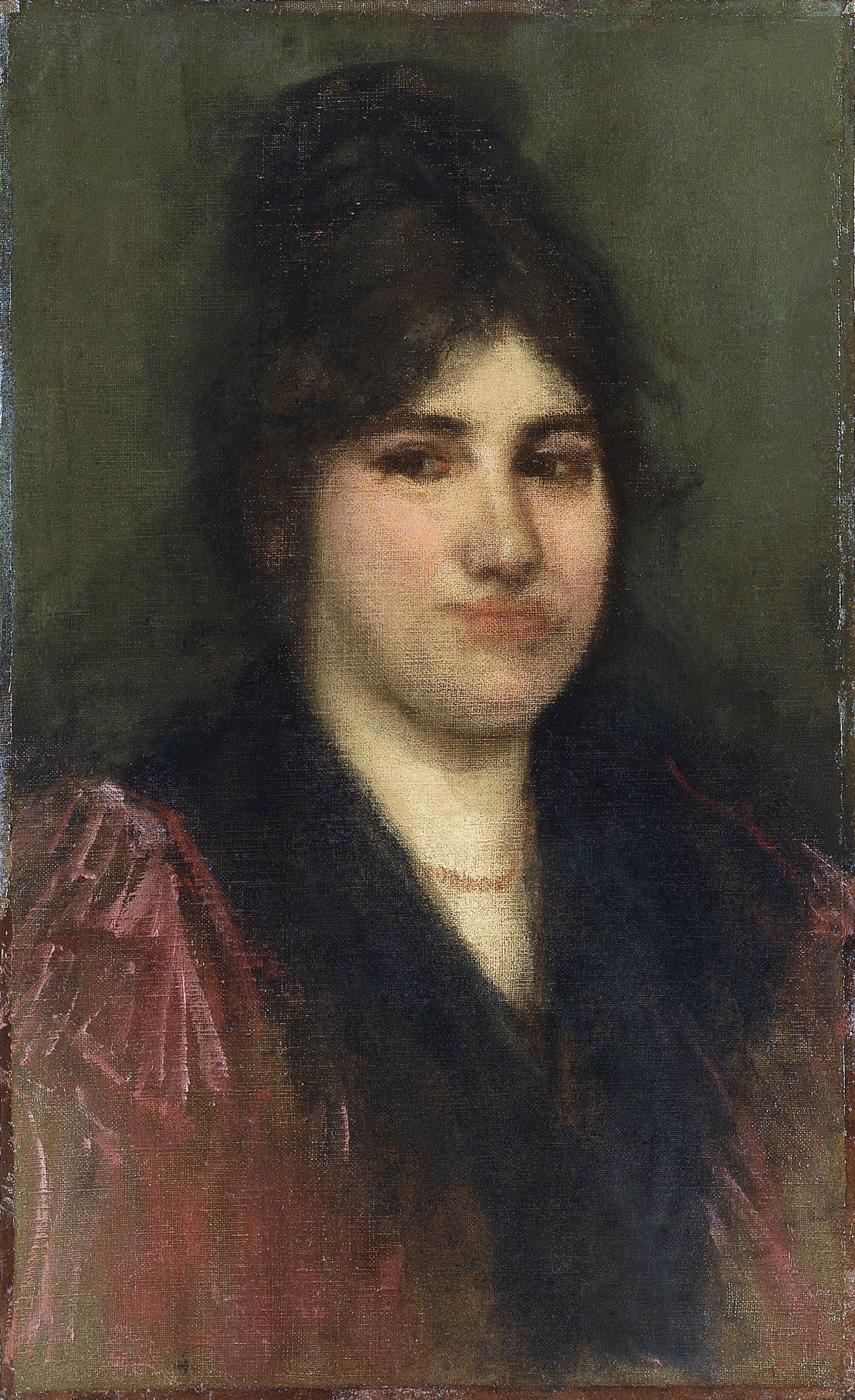
La Napolitana – Carmen Rossi (c.1897) by James Whistler

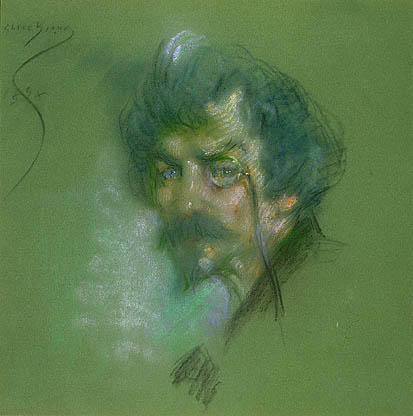
James Whistler (1898) by Alice Pike Barney

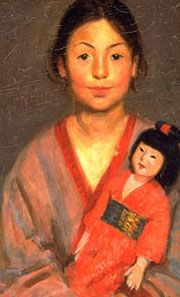
Japanese Girl with Doll (c.1898–1901) by Mary Foote

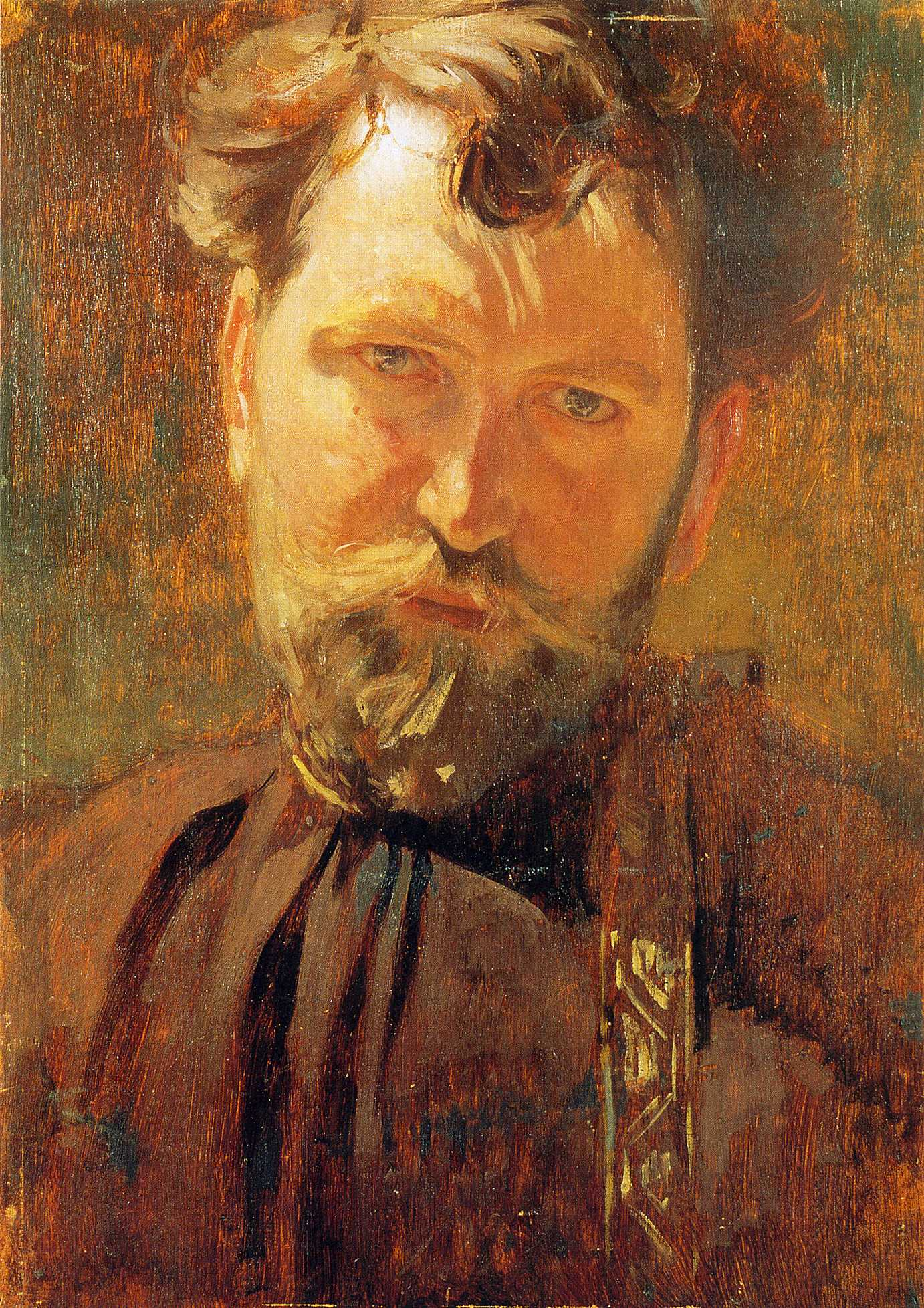
Self-Portrait (1899) by Alphonse Mucha

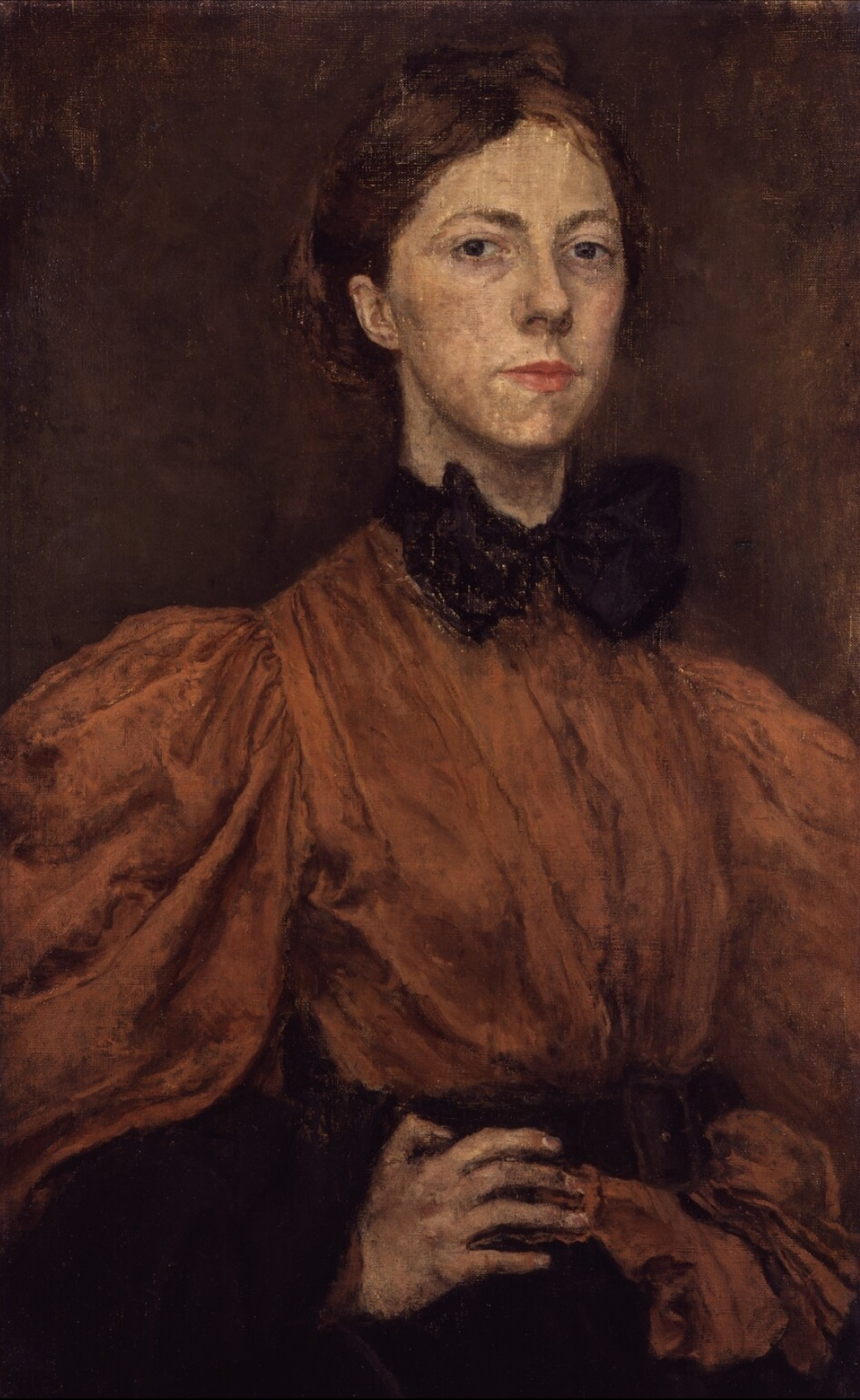
Self-Portrait (c.1900) by Gwen John

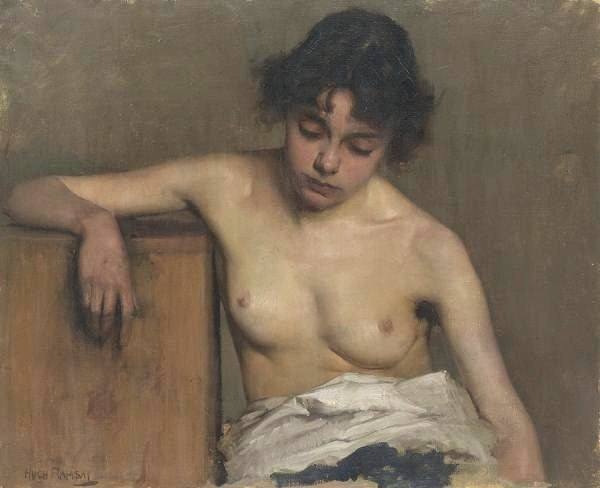
Nude (c.1900) by Hugh Ramsay

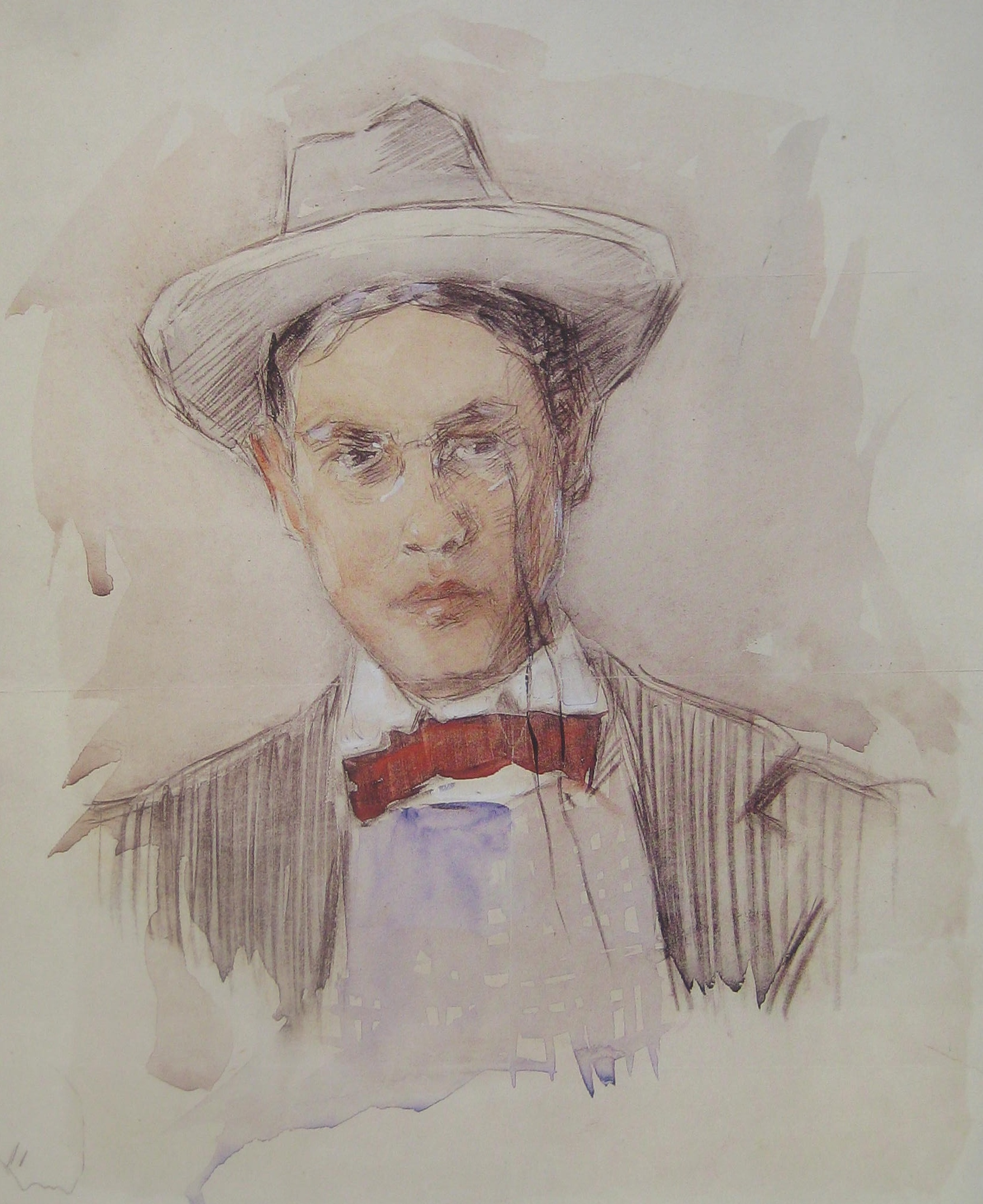
Self-Portrait (1901) by Frederick Carl Frieseke

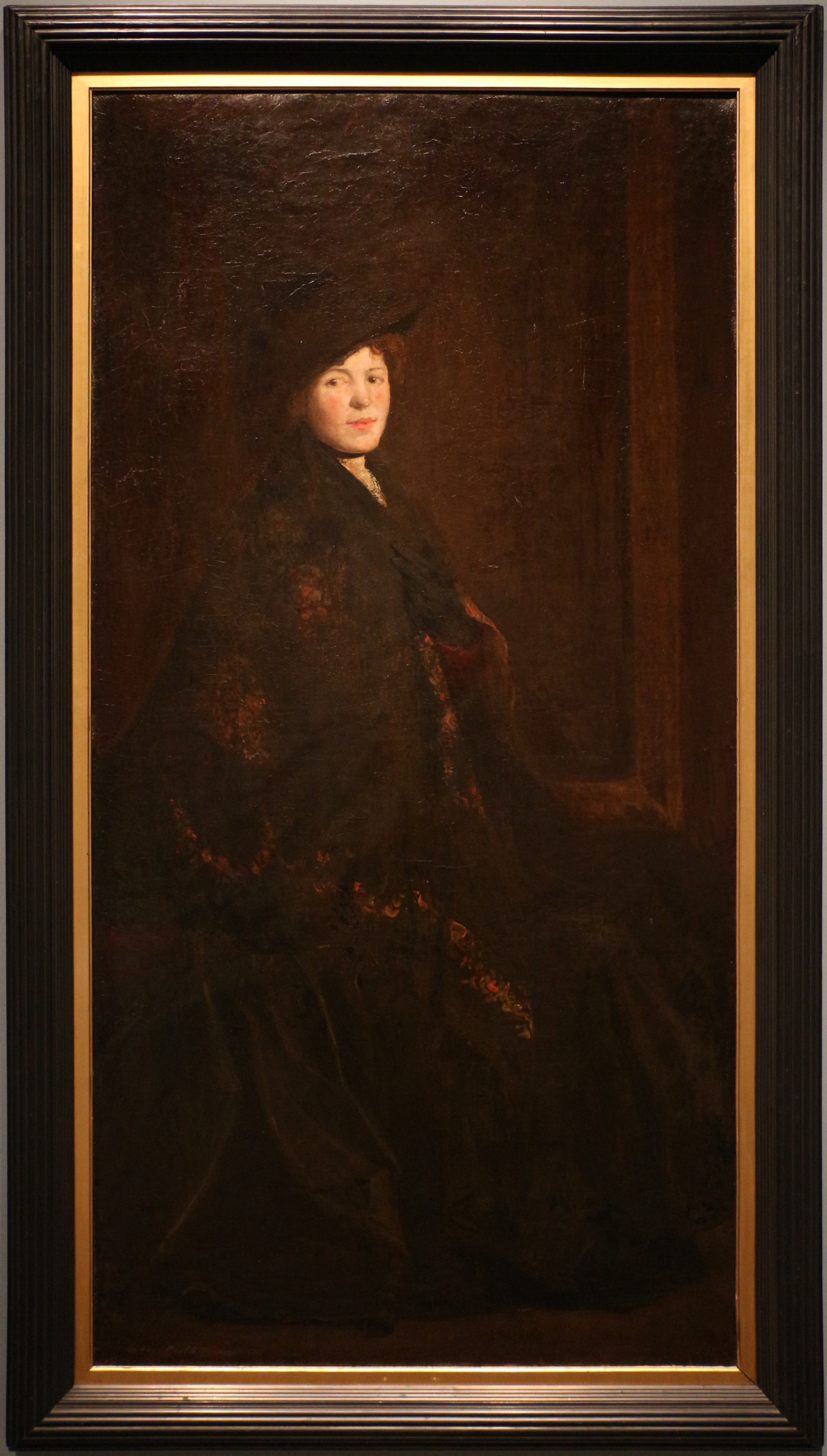
Madame Fisher (c.1904) by Eugene Paul Ullman
