= List of people from Asheville, North Carolina =

This is a list of notable persons who were born in and/or have lived in the American city of Asheville, North Carolina.

== Architecture ==
- Douglas Ellington (1886–1960), architect
- Rafael Guastavino (1842–1908), builder and engineer; buried at the Basilica of St. Lawrence, Asheville
- Doan Ogden (1908–1989), nationally noted landscape architect during the 20th century
- Richard Sharpe Smith (1853–1924), supervising architect of Biltmore Estate

== Art ==
- Murphy Anderson (1926–2015), comics artist
- James Barnhill (born 1955), artist and sculptor
- Aubrey Vanderbilt Cecil (born 1990), jewelry designer
- Andrea Clark (1945–2025), photographer
- Evan Dahm (born 1987), webcomic creator
- James Daugherty (1889–1974), modernist painter, muralist, children's book author and illustrator
- Spencer Herr (born 1974), artist
- Hope Larson (born 1982), Eisner Award-winning illustrator, cartoonist, and author of graphic novels Salamander Dream and Chiggers
- Greg London (born 1966), musician Las Vegas headliner
- George Masa (1881–1933), professional large-format photographer
- Kenneth Noland (1924–2010), abstract painter, one of the best-known American Color Field painters
- Isaiah Rice (1917–1980), documentary photographer
- Stone Roberts (born 1951), painter
- Donald Sultan (born 1951), painter, sculptor, and printmaker
- George Washington Vanderbilt II (1862–1914), art collector, founder of the Biltmore Estate

== Business ==
- George Henry Vanderbilt Cecil, owner and chairman of Biltmore Farms
- William Amherst Vanderbilt Cecil, operator of the Biltmore Estate through his company, The Biltmore Company
- John Fleer, chef, cookbook author, and restaurateur
- Edwin Wiley Grove (1850–1927), patent medicine inventor, builder and owner of the Grove Park Inn
- Howard Kester (1904–1977), author and organizer of the Southern Tenant Farmers Union
- Howard W. Mattson, executive vice president of the Institute of Food Technologists and director of corporate public relations for Monsanto Company
- George Willis Pack, lumberman, philanthropist, and railroad president
- Irving Jacob Reuter, general manager and president of Oldsmobile
- Fred L. Seely, built the Grove Park Inn with his father-in-law Edwin Wiley Grove
- Ashleigh Shanti, chef
- David Webb (1925–1975), jeweler and founder of the David Webb company
- George Francis Willis, founder of International Proprietaries, Inc., who made a fortune selling a patent medicine called Tanlac

== Education ==
- Elizabeth Barnes, professor of philosophy at the Corcoran Department of Philosophy, University of Virginia
- Rebel A. Cole, professor of finance in the College of Business at Florida Atlantic University
- Jane Sherron De Hart (born 1936), feminist historian and women's studies academic
- Sarah Ann Douglas, professor of computer and information science and a member of the Computational Science Institute at the University of Oregon
- Edythe J. Gaines (1922–2006), educator and school superintendent
- Matthew Hughey, professor of sociology at the University of Connecticut
- R. P. Hunnicutt, one of the founders of the U.S. Army Ordnance Museum at Aberdeen Proving Ground and historian
- Kenneth Lieberthal, professor and political scientist known as an expert on China's elite politics
- Edward Hart Lipscombe, professor at Shaw University
- Robert Allen Phillips, professor in Business Ethics, professor of Strategic Management and Public Policy at the Schulich School of Business; York University
- Emily Wheelock Reed, director of the Alabama Public Library Service Division during the civil rights movement
- John Andrew Rice, founder and first rector of Black Mountain College
- Debbie Ricker (born 1965), reproductive biologist and interim president of Hood College
- Richard M. Weaver, scholar who taught English at the University of Chicago
- Luigi Zande, stonemason, educator, and builder who contributed to the settlement school movement of the early 20th century

== Entertainment ==
- Harry Anderson (1952–2018), actor, starred in NBC's Night Court
- Clint Basinger (born 1986), YouTuber
- Ira Bernstein, dancer and teacher
- Mark Boswell (born 1960), film director
- Joe Bowman (1925–2009), bootmaker and marksman of American West entertainment; grew up in Asheville but left for Houston, Texas, in 1937
- Chris Chalk, television, film, and theater actor, born in Asheville and graduated from Asheville High School
- Jim David, stand-up comedian and playwright, both in Asheville
- Jim Eason (born 1935), radio talk show host
- Jennifer Ehle, actress
- Maria Fletcher (born 1942), Miss America 1962
- Eileen Fulton (born 1933), actress, starred on the CBS soap As the World Turns, 1960–2010; born in Asheville
- Joel Goffin (born 1981), film composer, music producer
- Flamy Grant (born 1982), drag queen and Christian singer
- Perla Haney-Jardine (born 1997), actress
- Dorothy Hart (1922–2004), screen actress, known mostly for supporting roles
- William S. Hart (1864–1946), cowboy actor in early Hollywood; resided in Asheville around 1900 and coached shows at the Asheville Opera House
- Shirley Hemphill (1947–1999), stand-up comedian and actress, best known for What's Happening!!, 1976–79
- Alina María Hernández, better known in the entertainment world as "Cachita", Cuban transgender television actress
- Charlton Heston (1923–2008), Oscar-winning actor, managed the Asheville Community Theatre with his wife Lydia in 1947
- Sam Irvin, film and television director, producer, and screenwriter
- Taras Kulakov (born 1987), YouTuber
- Daliah Lavi (1942–2017), German singer who lived the last 27 years of her life in Asheville
- Barbara Loden, actress and director of film and theater
- Stephen Andrew Lynch, early motion picture industry pioneer
- Andie MacDowell (born 1958), actress, lived for several years in Biltmore Forest, a suburb of Asheville
- Sierra McCormick (born 1997), actress
- Caelynn Miller-Keyes, television personality, model, and beauty pageant titleholder
- Caleb Pressley (born 1992), blogger, podcaster, and interviewer for the sports and pop culture blog Barstool Sports
- Margaret Qualley, actress
- Marjorie Rambeau (1889–1970), Hollywood actress; was married to Francis A. Gudger, a resident of Asheville; resided in Asheville in the winter from 1932 to the mid-1940s
- Adam Reed (born 1970), voice actor, animator, screenwriter, television producer and television director
- Chase Rice, country music singer, songwriter, and contestant on Survivor: Nicaragua
- Eric Rosen, theater director and playwright
- Paul Schneider (born 1976), actor
- Angela Shelton (born 1972), actress and producer
- Drew Starkey (born 1993), actor, Outer Banks
- Threadbanger, YouTube DIY duo consisting of Corinne Leigh and Rob Czar, who reside and own an art gallery in Asheville
- Duncan Trussell (born 1974), actor and comedian
- Bellamy Young (born 1970), actress, co-star of television series Scandal; born and raised in Asheville
- Collier Young, film and television writer and producer

== Government ==
- Lewis M. Branscomb, head of the National Bureau of Standards
- Moe Davis, director of the Air Force Judiciary
- Julius Patton, superintendent of the Dahlonega Mint
- Reuben B. Robertson Jr., U.S. deputy secretary of defense
- William J. Trent, part of U.S. President Franklin Delano Roosevelt's Black Cabinet, serving as adviser on Negro Affairs

== Law ==
- Fred H. Caplan, former justice of the Supreme Court of Appeals of West Virginia
- Judy Clarke, criminal defense attorney
- Harry Martin, associate justice of the North Carolina Supreme Court

== Literature and journalism ==
- Edward Johnston Alexander, author known by the pen name Katie Gallagher
- Sarah Addison Allen, New York Times bestselling author
- Alfred Horatio Belo, founder of The Dallas Morning News
- Ruth and Latrobe Carroll (1899–1999; 1894–1996), children's authors and illustrators
- Nancy Sales Cash, novelist
- Andrea Long Chu, writer and critic
- C. A. Conrad (born 1966), poet and author
- Olive Tilford Dargan (1869–1968), proletarian novelist of the 1930s under the pen name Fielding Burke
- Gavin Geoffrey Dillard, poet, author, and songwriter
- Pamela Duncan, novelist
- Wilma Dykeman (1920–2006), author
- John Ehle (1925–2018), author
- Zelda Fitzgerald (1900–1948), writer and wife of F. Scott Fitzgerald; died in a fire with eight other women at Highland Hospital, an Asheville mental institution in the Montford district
- Charles Frazier (born 1950), author
- Gail Godwin (born 1937), novelist, spent her early years in Asheville
- Ward Greene, writer, editor, journalist, playwright, and comic strip writer
- O. Henry (1862–1910), pen name of author William Sydney Porter; lived for a while in Asheville and is buried in Riverside Cemetery
- Denise Kiernan, journalist, producer and author
- Horatio Sheafe Krans, writer and editor
- Grey Wolfe LaJoie, writer and O. Henry Award recipient; born in Asheville
- Michael McFee, poet
- Berniece Baker Miracle (1919–2014), writer and half-sister of Marilyn Monroe
- William Dudley Pelley, fascist activist, journalist, writer and occultist
- Stephanie Perkins, novelist
- Marisha Pessl, novelist
- Terry Roberts, novelist and writer
- Jonathan Williams (1908–1929), poet and publisher
- Michael G. Williams, novelist
- Allan Wolf, poet and young adult author
- Thomas Wolfe (1900–1938), author, born and raised in Asheville, buried in Riverside Cemetery

== Medicine and science ==
- Dorothy Hansine Andersen, physician; first person to identify cystic fibrosis; inducted into National Women's Hall of Fame in 2002 for scientific work
- Elizabeth Blackwell (1821–1910), the first recognized woman doctor in the United States
- Lena Northern Buckner, pioneer in social work at the Oteen Veterans Administration Hospital
- Betty Collette, veterinary pathologist
- John E. Exner, psychologist
- William Glenn, cardiac surgeon who co-created an early version of an artificial heart
- Madelon Battle Hancock, nurse during World War I and the "most decorated woman of World War One"
- Hal Herzog, anthrozoologist
- J. Larry Jameson, interim president of University of Pennsylvania
- Howard W. Mattson

== Military ==
- Donald V. Bennett (1915–2005), former commanding general of the US Army Pacific Command
- Kathleen M. Gainey (born 1956), retired US Army lieutenant general
- Hugh B. Hester (1895–1983), retired Army general who opposed the Vietnam War and the Cold War
- Homer W. Kiefer (1898–1976), US Army major general
- Dorothy Swain Lewis, aviator who trained Navy pilots and flew with the Women Airforce Service Pilots (WASP) program during World War II
- Homer I. Lewis, major general in the United States Air Force who served as commander of the United States Air Force Reserve Command
- Robert Morgan (1918–2004), pilot of the Memphis Belle, the famed World War II B-17 bomber
- Kiffin Rockwell (1892–1916), aviator; pilot in the Lafayette Escadrille; first American to shoot down an enemy aircraft
- John E. Sloan (1887–1972), US Army major general, commanded 88th Infantry Division in World War II
- Francis Bowditch Wilby, major general in the United States Army; 39th superintendent of the United States Military Academy
- Zachary Taylor Wood (1860–1915), assistant commissioner of North-West Mounted Police and commissioner of Yukon Territory
- Robert Nicholas Young, lieutenant general in the United States Army

== Musicians ==
- Eric Bachmann, musician and producer
- Noah Bendix-Balgley, classical violinist
- Lisa Bevill (born 1961), contemporary Christian musician
- Greg Cartwright (born 1970), rock musician; relocated to Asheville
- Luke Combs (born 1990), country music singer-songwriter, graduated from A.C. Reynolds High School
- Indigo De Souza (born 1997), musician
- Jermaine Dupri (born 1972), rapper
- Backwards Sam Firk (1943–2007), country blues singer, fingerstyle guitarist, songwriter, and record collector
- Roberta Flack (1937–2025), Grammy Award-winning singer, born in Asheville
- Sallie Ford, of Sallie Ford and the Sound Outside, singer
- Rayna Gellert (born 1975), fiddler, acoustic guitarist, singer, and songwriter specializing in old-time music
- River Guerguerian, multi-percussionist and composer
- Ash Gutierrez (born 2005), musician, rapper
- Talib Rasul Hakim (1940–1988), composer
- Warren Haynes (born 1960), guitarist, member of The Allman Brothers Band, spent formative years in Asheville
- Steven Heller, composer and producer
- Malcolm Holcombe (1955–2024), singer-songwriter
- David Holt (born 1946), folk musician, lives near Asheville
- Don Howland, underground musician
- Caleb Johnson (born 1991), American Idol Season 13 winner
- Billy Jonas, singer-songwriter, percussionist, and multi-instrumentalist
- Gary Jules (born 1969), singer-songwriter, known for their rendition of "Mad World" for the film Donnie Darko
- Christine Kane, folk singer-songwriter and acoustic guitarist
- Bascom Lamar Lunsford (1882–1973), folklorist, musician, folk festival founder
- Mary Lattimore (born 1980), harpist
- MJ Lenderman (born 1999), singer-songwriter and multi-instrumentalist
- Valorie Miller, singer-songwriter
- Bill Monroe (1911–1996), musician, known as "the father of bluegrass"; lived in Asheville; had a show on a local radio station in 1939
- Robert Moog (1934–2005), pioneer of electronic music, inventor of the Moog synthesizer
- Cameron Moore (born 1994), singer-songwriter
- Rex Nelon (1932–2000), gospel singer
- Frances Nero (1943–2014), soul and jazz singer
- Angel Olsen (born 1987), musician
- Squire Parsons (born 1948), singer and songwriter
- Rainey Qualley (born 1989), singer under the name Rainsford
- Tyler Ramsey, singer-songwriter
- Chase Rice (born 1985) country music singer, songwriter, and contestant on Survivor: Nicaragua,
- Jimmie Rodgers, singer, known as "the father of country music"; lived in Asheville; had a show on a local radio station in 1927
- Chris Rodrigues (born 1989), contemporary Christian music singer, songwriter, multi-instrumentalist
- Jonathan Scales (born 1984), steel pannist and composer
- Chris Sharp (born 1973), singer-songwriter
- Nina Simone (1933–2003), jazz singer, attended Allen Home School for Girls in Asheville
- Arthur Lee "Red" Smiley (1925–1972), bluegrass and country musician
- Root Boy Slim, aka Foster Mackenzie III (1945–1993), blues musician
- Moses Sumney (born 1992), singer-songwriter
- Bryan Sutton, flatpicking acoustic guitar player
- John Widman, luthier who makes high-end, hand-built guitars
- David Wilcox (born 1958), folk musician and singer-songwriter
- Kat Williams, blues singer

== Politics ==
- Terry Bellamy, mayor of Asheville
- Cecil Bothwell, Asheville City Council
- Charles Robin Britt, U.S. representative
- William Jennings Bryan (1860–1925), United States secretary of state and U.S. representative
- Alice A. W. Cadwallader (1832–1910), philanthropist and temperance activist
- Madison Cawthorn (born 1995), U.S. House of Representatives
- Mark B. Childress (born 1959), former United States ambassador to Tanzania and former deputy chief of staff for Planning in the administration of President Obama
- R. L. Clark, North Carolina Senate
- James M. Clarke, U.S. representative
- Lillian Exum Clement, first woman elected to the North Carolina General Assembly
- Marie Colton (1922–2018), first female speaker pro tempore of the North Carolina House of Representatives
- H. K. Edgerton (1948–2026), neoconfederate activist and president of the Asheville, North Carolina chapter of the NAACP
- Joe Felmet, civil rights activist
- Susan C. Fisher, North Carolina House of Representatives
- D. Bruce Goforth, North Carolina House of Representatives
- V. Lamar Gudger, United States House of Representatives
- Bill Hendon (1944–2018), author, POW/MIA activist, and two-term U.S. congressman from North Carolina
- Patricia Hollingsworth Holshouser (1939–2006), First Lady of North Carolina
- Herbert Hyde, North Carolina Senate and North Carolina House of Representatives
- Bill Jackson, Georgia State Senate and Georgia House of Representatives
- Horace R. Kornegay, U.S. House of Representatives
- Helen Morris Lewis, suffragist, first woman in North Carolina to seek elected office
- Esther Manheimer, mayor of Asheville
- Julie Mayfield, North Carolina Senate
- Floyd McKissick, lawyer and civil rights activist who led the Congress of Racial Equality for a time and founded Soul City, North Carolina
- Dan K. Moore (1906–1986), 66th governor of North Carolina 1965–1969
- Martin Nesbitt, North Carolina Senate
- Mary Cordell Nesbitt (1911–1979), served in the North Carolina House of Representatives
- Leonard Outerbridge, lieutenant governor of Newfoundland
- Richmond Pearson, U.S. representative
- William Dudley Pelley (1890–1965), leader of the "Silver Shirt" fascist movement in the 1930s and 1940s
- Loula Roberts Platt (1863–1934), suffragist and first woman to run for a seat in the North Carolina Senate
- Lindsey Prather, North Carolina House of Representatives
- J. E. Rankin (1845–1928), mayor of Asheville and chair of the Buncombe County Commissioners for 26 years
- James W. Reid (1917–1972), served as the mayor of Raleigh, North Carolina
- Robert R. Reynolds (1884–1963), U.S. senator of isolationist sympathies in World War II
- Michael Robinson (1924–2006), American Reform rabbi and civil rights activist
- Jim Roddey, chief executive of Allegheny County, Pennsylvania
- Caleb Rudow, North Carolina House of Representatives
- Thomas A. Rymer, Maryland House of Delegates and judge of the Calvert County Circuit Court
- Wilma M. Sherrill, North Carolina General Assembly
- George A. Shuford, U.S. representative and North Carolina House of Representatives
- Charles Manly Stedman, U.S. representative and lieutenant governor of North Carolina
- John Shorter Stevens, North Carolina House of Representatives
- Brian Turner, North Carolina House of Representatives
- Joseph Tydings (1928–2018), lawyer and politician
- Terry Van Duyn, North Carolina Senate
- Robert Brank Vance, U.S. House of Representatives
- Zebulon Vance, governor of North Carolina and United States senator
- Lewis Whitworth, Florida House of Representatives and Miami-Dade County circuit court judge
- William Winkenwerder Jr. (born 1954), assistant secretary of Defense for Health Affairs (2001–2007)

== Religion ==
- Kevin S. Brown, bishop of the Episcopal Diocese of Delaware
- Franklin Graham, Christian evangelist and missionary
- George Way Harley, Methodist medical missionary
- Lewis Pease, Methodist clergyman
- Michael Robinson, reform rabbi, civil rights activist, and human rights activist known for his association with Martin Luther King Jr.
- G. Porter Taylor, Episcopal bishop of Western North Carolina

== Sports ==
=== Baseball ===
- Jack Alexander, minor league baseball player and college football coach
- Tom Bradley, professional baseball player and coach
- Bob Chakales, professional baseball player
- Dave Cheadle, professional baseball player
- Harry Courtney, professional baseball and football player
- Braxton Davidson, professional baseball players
- Darren Holmes (born 1966), MLB player for eight teams
- Mel Ingram, professional baseball player
- Hughie Jennings (1869–1928), Major League Baseball player and manager, 1891–1925
- Johnny Lanning, professional baseball players
- Cameron Maybin (born 1987), Major League Baseball player with Los Angeles Angels; born and raised in Asheville
- Larry McCall, professional baseball player
- Joel McKeithan, professional baseball coach
- Dorothy Montgomery (1924–2009), All-American Girls Professional Baseball League player
- Chris Narveson (born 1981), MLB pitcher
- Buck Redfern, professional baseball player
- Mike Roberts, professional baseball player and college baseball coach
- Sammy Stewart, professional baseball player
- Don Thompson (1923–2009), Major League Baseball player for the Brooklyn Dodgers
- Joe West (born 1952), MLB umpire for record-breaking 40 seasons
- Pete Whisenant, professional baseball player

=== Basketball ===
- Brad Daugherty (born 1965), retired NBA basketball player, 5-time All-Star, ESPN NASCAR analyst
- Harry Hartsell, head football and basketball coach at North Carolina State University
- Loyd King (born 1949), professional basketball player
- Henry Logan, college basketball player who won the gold medal in the 1967 Pan American Games
- Rhonda Mapp (born 1969), WNBA player
- Rashad McCants (born 1984), NBA basketball player for Minnesota Timberwolves and Sacramento Kings; former Erwin High School basketball player
- Rashanda McCants (born 1986), WNBA player
- Christian Moody, college and professional basketball player
- Buzz Peterson (born 1963), former director of player personnel for NBA's Charlotte Bobcats; former men's head basketball coach at UNC Wilmington, University of Tennessee, Appalachian State University, University of Tulsa, and Coastal Carolina University; born and raised in Asheville
- Roy Williams (born 1950), University of North Carolina at Chapel Hill basketball coach, raised in Asheville

=== Football ===
- LeRoy Abernethy, college football player
- Jack Alexander, college football coach and minor league baseball player
- John Avery (born 1976), football player in NFL, XFL, and CFL; attended Asheville High School
- Kent Briggs, college football coach
- Crezdon Butler (born 1987), NFL cornerback for Pittsburgh Steelers; born and raised in Asheville; led Asheville High School to 2006 state championship
- Joey Clinkscales, professional football player and executive
- Harry Courtney, professional football and baseball player
- Jonathan Crompton, professional football player
- Rico Dowdle (born 1998), NFL running back
- Claude "Hoot" Gibson, professional football player
- Harry Hartsell, head football and basketball coach at North Carolina State University
- Dan Hill, college football player and All-American
- Martese Jackson, professional gridiron football player
- Ralph James, college football coach
- Ben Johnson, professional football coach
- Charlie "Choo Choo" Justice (1924–2003), professional football player
- Eku Leota, professional football player
- Leonard Little (born 1974), NFL football player with St. Louis Rams; born and raised in Asheville
- Eddie McGill, professional football player
- Harold Olson, professional football player
- Jeoffrey Pagan, professional football player
- Ray Roberts (born 1969), retired NFL player
- James Rosecrans, professional football player
- Jonathan Rush (born 1989), college football player
- Bill Russo, college football coach
- Red Sanders, college football coach
- George Stephens, college football player
- Brett Swain (born 1986), NFL player for Green Bay Packers
- Aydan White, college football player
- Johnny White, professional football player

=== Racing ===
- Jack Ingram, retired NASCAR driver
- Stephen Leicht (born 1987), NASCAR driver
- Robert Pressley (born 1959), retired NASCAR driver, born in Asheville
- Ronnie Silver (born 1951), NASCAR driver
- Roy Trantham, stock car racing driver

=== Soccer ===
- Hunter Gilstrap, professional soccer player
- Nate Torbett (born 1994), professional soccer player for Coomera Colts SC and coach

=== Swimming ===
- Mary Montgomery, swimmer
- Stephen Rerych (born 1946), Olympic gold medalist in swimming

=== Professional wrestling ===
- Karl Anderson, professional wrestler; signed to WWE
- Adam "Edge" Copeland (born 1973), professional wrestler, author, relocated to Asheville
- Eddie Golden (born 1973), professional wrestler, resides in Asheville
- Evan Golden (born 2000), professional wrestler, born and raised in Asheville
- Beth Phoenix (born 1980), real name Elizabeth Copeland; retired professional wrestler, four-time women's champion, and commentator; relocated to Asheville
- K. C. Thunder, professional wrestler, promoter and trainer
- Cash Wheeler (born 1987), real name Daniel Wheeler; professional wrestler for All Elite Wrestling; born and raised in Asheville, where he currently resides

=== Other ===
- Stacey Bentley, competitive bodybuilder
- Joe Bowman, marksman
- Matt Carpenter, ultramarathoner as a trail runner and in high altitude marathons
- Cameron Cogburn, cyclist
- Jennifer Pharr Davis (born 1982), long-distance hiker; unofficial record holder of fastest through-hike of Appalachian Trail
- Lawson Duncan (born 1964), former Grand Prix tennis tour player
- Kelly Grieve, member of the United States women's national softball team she won 2011 World Cup of Softball
- Willow Koerber, mountain biker
- Rachel Kuehn, amateur golfer
- Frank Messer, sportscaster, known for his eighteen seasons announcing New York Yankees baseball games

== Other ==
- Ella Henrietta Davidson Morrison, philanthropist and North Carolina state regent of the Daughters of the American Revolution
- Cornelia Stuyvesant Vanderbilt, heiress of the Biltmore Estate

== See also ==
- List of people from North Carolina
