= Helen Lewis =

Helen Lewis may refer to:

- Helen Morris Lewis (1852–1933), American suffragist
- Helen Lewis (chemist) (1896–?), American chemist
- Helen Lewis (film editor) (1898–?), Canadian film editor
- Helen Block Lewis (1913–1987), American psychiatrist and psychoanalyst
- Helen Lewis (choreographer) (1916–2009), dance teacher and choreographer
- Helen Matthews Lewis (1924–2022), American sociologist, historian, and activist
- Helen Lewis (journalist) (born 1983), English journalist
- Helen Lewis (politician) (died 1938), American politician
