= Torbett =

Torbett is a surname. Notable people with the surname include:

- John Torbett (born 1956), American politician from North Carolina
- Nate Torbett (born 1994), American soccer player and coach
