= North Buncombe High School =

Location
- 890 Clarks Chapel Road; Weaverville, North Carolina 28787; United States; 35°44′23″N 82°33′27″W

Information
- Type: Public
- Established: 1954 (72 years ago)
- School district: Buncombe County Schools
- CEEB code: 344220
- Teaching staff: 54.04 (FTE)
- Grades: 9–12
- Enrollment: 896 (2024-2025)
- Student to teacher ratio: 16.58
- Colors: Black and white
- Mascot: Blackhawk
- Website: nbhs.buncombeschools.org

North Buncombe High School is a public high school in Weaverville, North Carolina accommodating over 900 students in grades 9–12. The school's mascot is the Black Hawk and the school principal is Kevin Yontz.

== History ==
North Buncombe High School was opened after the decision to build larger schools and a $5.5 million bond that county voters approved. William B. Brackett designed the original $658,000 building housing 200 students, which opened August 26, 1954 on 31 acres, the first to open under the new plan. Barnardsville, Flat Creek, Red Oak, French Broad High Schools became K–8 schools and Weaverville High School became Weaverville Middle School (grades 5-8). In 1987, a new school opened on the former site of Asheville-Weaverville Speedway. The old high school building then became North Buncombe Middle School.

North Buncombe High School houses the DeBruhl theatre. The marching band has won numerous awards.

== Notable alumni ==
- Chris Rodrigues, Contemporary Christian music singer, songwriter, multi-instrumentalist
- Nate Torbett, professional soccer player
- Karlyn Pickens, Tennessee softball pitcher. 2x SEC Pitcher of the Year (2024 and 2025) and 3x first-team All-American (2024-26)
