= Krans =

Krans is a surname. Notable people with the surname include:

- Horatio Sheafe Krans (1872–1952), American author and editor
- Olof Krans (1838–1916), Swedish-American folk artist
