= Chris Rodriguez =

Chris Rodriguez may refer to:

- Chris Rodriguez (singer) (born 1960), singer/songwriter
- Chris Rodriguez (baseball, born 1976), baseball manager
- Chris Rodriguez (pitcher) (born 1998), baseball pitcher
- Chris Rodriguez Jr. (born 2000), American football player
- Chris Rodriguez, fictional character in the Percy Jackson & the Olympians series

== See also ==
- Chris Rodrigues (born 1989), American Contemporary Christian music singer
