= Terry Roberts =

Terry Roberts may refer to:

- Terry Roberts (politician) (1946–2006), Australian politician
- Terry Roberts (educator) (born 1956), American author and educator
- Terry Roberts (basketball) (born 2000), American professional basketball player

== See also ==
- "My Name is Terry Roberts", a song by Pete Seeger
- Terrence Roberts (disambiguation)
