= Gibson Bros. =

American garage rock band

Background information
- Origin: Columbus, Ohio, US
- Genres: Psychobilly; garage rock; punk blues
- Years active: 1984–1993
- Labels: Sympathy for the Record Industry; Positive Music; Homestead
- Spinoffs: '68 Comeback; Bassholes; Boss Hog; Ego Summit; Monster Truck Five; Pussy Galore
- Past members: Jeffrey Evans; Don Howland; Jeff Evans; Dan Dow; Ellen Hoover; Rob Kennedy; Scott Jarvis; Jon Spencer; Christina Martinez

The Gibson Bros. was an American garage rock band formed in Columbus, Ohio, in 1984 by singer, songwriter, and musicologist Jeffrey Evans. Formed in 1984 as a quartet, the band serves as the origin of various garage rock bands including '68 Comeback, the Workdogs, and the Bassholes.

== History ==
The Gibson Bros. were formed in 1984 as a quartet with the lineup consisting of Don Howland, vocalist/guitarist; Jeffrey Evans, vocalist/guitarist; Dan Dow, guitarist; Ellen Hoover, drummer. The four remained consistent in the band's first three studio albums: Build a Raft (1986), Big Pine Boogie (1988), and Dedicated Fool (1989). Their debut album, Build a Raft, was only issued on cassette tape.

In the Gibson Bros.' fourth album, Punk Rock Truck Driving Song of a Gun, Howland and Evans were billed with the Workdogs, including bassist Rob Kennedy and drummer Scott Garvis. Their following album, The Man Who Loved Cough Dancing, they alternated between home recordings and live shots, with Jon Spencer and Christina Martinez being involved in the production. With their sixth and final album recorded at Sun Studio, Memphis Sol Today!, Spencer returned to be involved in the production of the album, and the Gibson Bros. broke up after the release of the album. By the time of the breakup, they were involved with their respective bands, with Evans in '68 Comeback and Howland in the Bassholes.

== Discography ==
=== Singles ===
- "Emulsified" b/w "Broke Down Engine" (Siltbreeze Records) SB 03. Vinyl recording. (1991)
- Keepers (OKra Records) OK 45001/104553. Vinyl recording. (1986) Songs: "My Young Life"; "Parchman Farm"; "Dirt".
- "Knock Down My Blues" b/w "I'm Driftin'" (In the Red) ITR 009. Vinyl recording. (1992)
- Mean Mistreater (Homestead Records) HMS 170–7. Vinyl recording. (1992) Songs: "Cat Drug In"; "Girl Can't Help It"; "Soul Deep".
- "My Huckleberry Friend" b/w "Old Devil". (Giant Claw) GCS 002. Vinyl recording. (1991)
- Southbound (Glitterhouse Records) GR 0152. Vinyl recording. (1991) Songs: "Big Pine Boogie"; "Arkansas"; "Mississippi Bo Weevil"; "Southbound"; "Tongue-Tied Jill".
- Who's Black and Who's Not? (Sympathy for the Record Industry) SFTRI 162. Vinyl recording. (1991) Songs: "White Nigger"; "Minnie the Moocher".

=== Albums ===
- Build a Raft (Old Age). Old Age 007. Cassette recording. (1986)
- Big Pine Boogie (OKra Records) OK 33002. Vinyl recording. (1988)
- Big Pine Boogie (Homestead Records) HMS 119–1. Vinyl recording. (1987)
- Dedicated Fool (Homestead Records) HMS 141–1. Vinyl recording. (1989) ^{Mehr}
- Gibson Bros. & Workdogs, Punk Rock Truck Driving Song of a Gun (Homestead Records) HMS 154–1. Vinyl recording. (1990)
- The Man Who Loved Couch Dancing (Homestead Records) HMS 163-1/2. Vinyl recording. (1991)
- Memphis Sol Today! (Sympathy for the Record Industry) SFTRI 176. Vinyl recording. (1993)
- Columbus Soul 85 (In the Red) ITR 034. Vinyl recording. (1996)

=== Compilations ===
- Various artists, A History of Memphis Garage Rock: The '90s (Shangri-La Records) Shangri-La 037. Vinyl recording. (2003) Song: "Emulsified"
- Various artists, Killed by the Blues (P-Vine) PCD 5486. Vinyl recording. (1999) Songs: "I'm Drifting"; "Mississippi Bo Weevil".
- Various artists, Brain Blo (Casting Couch) CCR 009. Vinyl recording. (1992) Song: "Not Fade Away".
- Various artists, Love Is My Only Crime (Intercord) IRS 964.966. Vinyl recording. (1993) Song: "I Don't Wanna Forget How to Jive".
- Various artists, Root Damage (Sympathy for the Record Industry) SFTRI 713. Vinyl recording. (2003) Song: "Memphis Chicken".
- Various artists, Tard & Further'd: Siltbreeze Singles Compilation (Siltbreeze Records) SB 52. Vinyl recording. Song: "Broke Down Engine".
- Various artists, Their Sympathetic Majesties Request: Volume 1: A Decade of Obscurity and Obsolescence, 1988–1998 (Sympathy for the Record Industry) SFTRI 200. Vinyl recording. (1998) Song: Barbara.
