= Terrence Roberts (disambiguation) =

Terrence Roberts may refer to:

- Terrence Roberts (born 1941), member of Little Rock Nine
- Terrence Roberts (basketball) (born 1984), former Syracuse Orange basketball player

== See also ==
- Terence Roberts, mayor of Anderson, South Carolina, beginning in 2006
- Terence Roberts, pen name of Ivan T. Sanderson
- Terry Roberts (disambiguation)
