= Don Howland =

American underground musician

Don Howland is an American underground musician best known for his work in the punk-blues duo the Bassholes beginning in 1992. Prior to the Bassholes, Howland played guitar and sang with the Gibson Bros., a Columbus, Ohio-based demented roots rock band that included Monsieur Jeffrey Evans, Dan Dow, Ellen Hoover, and later Jon Spencer and Rich Lillash. Lillash, Lamont "Bim" Thomas and James Owen have all drummed with the Bassholes in recent years. Howland also was a member of Wooden Tit and a Burning Bus. Howland participated in the Ego Summit project in 1997, which brought together longtime Columbus underground performers including Jim Shepard and Mike (Amrep) Rep, Tommy Jay (Jones) and Ron House. He has recorded for many independent labels including Matador, In the Red, Sympathy for the Record Industry, Hate Records (IT), Dead Canary, Revenant, Siltbreeze, Columbus Discount Records, and 12XU. He hosts a 20th-century classical music radio show on WSFM-LP, a community station.

== Discography ==
=== Gibson Bros. ===
Albums

- Build A Raft. (Old Age). Old Age 007. Cassette. (1987)
- Big Pine Boogie. (OKra Records) OK 33002. Vinyl. (1987)
- Big Pine Boogie. (Homestead Records) HMS 119-1. Vinyl. (1987)
- Dedicated Fool. (Homestead Records) HMS 141-1. Vinyl. (1989)
- The Man Who Loved Couch Dancing. (Homestead Records) HMS 163½. Vinyl. (1990)
- Memphis Sol Today! (Sympathy For The Record Industry) SFTRI 176. Vinyl. (1993)
- Columbus Soul 85. (In The Red) ITR 034. Vinyl. (1996)

Singles and E.P.s

- Keepers. (OKra Records) OK 45001/104553. Vinyl e.p. (1986) Songs: My Young Life; Parchman Farm; Dirt.
- Emulsified b/w Broke Down Engine. (Siltbreeze Records) SB 03. Vinyl. (1991)
- Knock Down My Blues b/w I'm Driftin'. (In The Red) ITR 009. Vinyl. (1992)
- Mean Mistreater. (Homestead Records) HMS 170-7. Vinyl e.p. (1992) Songs: Cat Drug In; Girl Can't Help It; Soul Deep.
- My Huckleberry Friend b/w Old Devil. (Giant Claw) GCS 002. Vinyl. (1991)
- Southbound. (Glitterhouse Records) GR 0152. Vinyl e.p. (1991) Songs: Big Pine Boogie; Arkansas, Mississippi Bo Weevil, Southbound, Tongue-Tied Jill.
- White Nigger b/w Minnie The Moocher. (Sympathy For The Record Industry) SFTRI 162. Vinyl. (1991)

=== Bassholes ===
Albums

- Blue Roots. (In the Red Records) Vinyl. (1993)
- Haunted Hill. (In the Red Records) Vinyl & CD. (1995)
- Deaf Mix 3. (In the Red Records) Vinyl & CD. (1997)
- Blue Roots. (Revenant Records) CD reissue. (1997)
- When My Blue Moon Turns Red Again. (In the Red Records) Vinyl (double LP) & CD. (1998)
- Long Way Blues. (Matador Records) Vinyl & CD (1998)
- The Secret Strength of Depression; live at KSPC. (Sympathy for the Record Industry) Vinyl & CD. (2000)
- Broke Chamber Music; 45s and unreleased. (Secret Keeper Records) CD. (2004)
- Bassholes. (Dead Canary Records) Vinyl & CD. (2005)
- ...and without a name. (Columbus Discount Records) Vinyl. (2009)
- Boogieman Stew. (Columbus Discount Records) Vinyl. (2013)

Singles and E.P.s

- 98 Degrees in the Shade b/w Melody for an Unchained Girl, Little Rug Bug (In the Red Records) (1992)
- John Henry b/w Cigarette Blues, Wooden Tit (Sympathy for the Record Industry) (1992)
- Baby Go b/w Hell Blues (Honey Man Records) (1994)
- (She Said I Had a) Problem b/w Changes had to Come (Bag of Hammers) (1995)
- Hey O.J. b/w Rout (In the Red Records) (1995)
- Lion's Share b/w Jesus Book (In the Red Records) (1996)
- Moody b/w Microscope Feeling w/ April March (Sympathy for the Record Industry)
- Interzone b/w Yea Heavy and a Bottle of Bread (Seldom Scene) Vinyl. (1997)
- Out in the Treetops 2x7" (Dead Canary Records) (2003)
- Jack at Night b/w Watch You Go (Solid Sex Lovie Doll Records) (2006)
- I Feel Like Sleeping & Bowling Ball 21st Century b/w (I Went) A Willing Prisoner & Cyclotron (CDR Singles Club, vinyl) (2010)

=== Solo ===
Albums

- The Land Beyond the Mountains. (Birdman) CD (2000)
- The Land Beyond the Mountains. (Secret Keeper) Vinyl (2006)
- Life Is a Nightmare. (12XU) Vinyl (2015)
- endgame. (In the Red Records) Vinyl (2020)

=== Wooden Tit ===
Albums

- Return to Cinder. (Hate Records) Vinyl & CD (2007)

Singles and E.P.s

- Sex Beat b/w Strange Notes (Hate Records) 2006
- Sechs Lieder (Red Lounge Records) Vinyl 6-song 10" e.p. (2008)

=== Misc. ===
Albums

- Ego Summit. (Old Age/No Age) Vinyl. 1998
- Ego Summit. (Old 3C Records) CD reissue. 2006
- a Burning Bus. (In The Red Records) Vinyl. 2020
