= Asheville City Schools =

School district in North Carolina

Address
- 85 Mountain Street Asheville, North Carolina, 28801; United States
- Coordinates: 35.597099°N 82.542030°W

District information
- Type: Public
- Motto: "Learn. Discover. Thrive."
- Grades: Pre-kindergarten – 12
- Established: 1887
- Superintendent: Maggie Fehrman

Students and staff
- Enrollment: 4,137 (2022–23)
- Faculty: 309.68 (FTE)
- Staff: 351.89 (FTE)
- Student–teacher ratio: 13.36

Other information
- Website: ashevillecityschools.net

Asheville City Schools is a local school district in Asheville, North Carolina. The district is responsible for serving large portions of the city of Asheville and as of the 2022–23 school year was responsible for serving 4,137 students.

== History ==
=== Founding and Early history ===
The first school west of the blue ridge mountains in Western North Carolina was built in Asheville in 1790 by Scotch-Irish settlers, and it was located around the area of present-day Biltmore avenue. Most of the early schools in the Asheville area were rudimentary subscription schools that only operated three to four months per year, and charged tuition for their services. Although they did provide education, the short school year and cost-prohibitive tuition limited the effectiveness of these institutions. This began to change, however, in 1887 when voters passed a referendum to allow a property and poll tax increase to pay for the construction and operation of public schools in Asheville. Although the bill eventually passed, it initially faced much opposition from wealthy landowners in the area, who were largely opposed to paying increased property taxes to fund education for the poorer classes. The first public school was opened on present day Orange Street in 1887, and offered grades first through ninth. The first superintendent was Mr. Philander P. Claxton.

The new school system initially faced many issues with overcrowding and finances, and was blighted by these troubles for much of its early history. However, it continued to expand and improve and by 1928 was reportedly recognized by the state superintendent of public education as the number one ranked school district in the state.

In January 2021 the school system voted in favor of renaming Vance Elementary School to Lucy S. Herring Elementary School. The move came following the George Floyd Protests in the summer of 2020. The school was named after Zebulon Vance, a Confederate era governor of North Carolina. Lucy S. Herring was an African-American Asheville City Schools educator. A task force for the City of Asheville and Buncombe County also voted to remove the Vance Monument in the city.

== Administration ==
Asheville City Schools is overseen by the Asheville City Board of Education. The board of education consist of seven members, all of whom are elected as of December of 2024, after historically being appointed by the Asheville City Council. The board typically conducts work sessions on the first Monday of each month and host regular meetings with public comment on the second Monday of each month. Elections are non-partisan and there is a limit of two consecutive four-year terms for board members. According to the City of Asheville website, the board of education is entrusted with "general control and supervision of all matters pertaining to the public schools of the school district" as well as "the authority to enforce the school law". They are also given all powers pertaining to the school system not explicitly conferred to others.

There have been multiple suggestions to combine Asheville City Schools with the larger Buncombe County Schools System since the 1960s. Main reasons for this suggestion of combining districts are the Asheville City Schools budget deficit and large administration costs that would be able to be managed by one system. A comprehensive consolidation study mandated by the North Carolina General Assembly and completed under the authority of Buncombe County government in January 2025 concluded that consolidation would not save money nor improve outcomes for students. The study found that neither school district was in a financial crisis and neither district would be expected to save significant money through combined administration.

== Schools ==
The city of Asheville currently operates eight schools, a preschool program and an alternative program including:

- Asheville High School
- School of Inquiry and Life Sciences Asheville (a designated Innovative Cooperative High School, often abbreviated as SILSA)
- Asheville Middle School
- Claxton Elementary
- Hall Fletcher Elementary
- Ira B. Jones Elementary
- Isaac Dickson Elementary
- Lucy S. Herring Elementary
- William Randolph Campus (alternative program, formerly Montford North Star Academy)
