= Helen Lewis (chemist) =

American chemist

Helen Geneva Lewis (October 22, 1896 – missing) was an American chemist.

== Early life and education ==
Born in New Haven, Connecticut, Lewis attended Mount Holyoke College for her undergraduate education and earned her degree in 1921. She then moved to Yale University as an honorary scholar, and earned her Ph.D. in 1923. She pursued postgraduate education at the University of Paris from 1926 to 1927 and at Claremont College in 1928.

== Career and research ==
Lewis's career began in teaching chemistry. She taught at Connecticut College in 1925 and at Long Beach Junior College from 1928 to 1929. She then moved to Stanford University, where she was a researcher from 1931 to 1934. While at Stanford, she conducted research on protein metabolism, amino acids, and the vapor pressure of salt solutions. However, after four years, she returned to teaching and was a principal, from 1934 to 1935, at Miss Harker's School for girls in Palo Alto, a predecessor of today's Harker School. She was then a mathematics teacher at Beverly Hills High School from 1935 to 1936. After this stint in high schools, she returned to research with the College of Osteopathic Physicians and Surgeons, where she remained for the rest of her career and continued her biochemical research.
