= Eku Leota =

American football player (born 1999)

No. 54 – Arizona Cardinals
- Position: Outside linebacker
- Roster status: Active

Personal information
- Born: May 11, 1999 (age 27); Falefā, Samoa
- Listed height: 6 ft 4 in (1.93 m)
- Listed weight: 257 lb (117 kg)

Career information
- High school: Asheville (Asheville, North Carolina, U.S.)
- College: Northwestern (2018–2020); Auburn (2021–2022)
- NFL draft: 2023: undrafted

Career history
- Carolina Panthers (2023–2024); Pittsburgh Steelers (2024); New Orleans Saints (2025)*; Arizona Cardinals (2025–present)*
- * Offseason or practice squad member only

Awards and highlights
- Third-team All-Big Ten (2020)

Career NFL statistics as of Week 5, 2026
- Total tackles: 16
- Sacks: 1
- Stats at Pro Football Reference

Eku Leota (born May 11, 1999) is a Samoan-American professional football outside linebacker for the Arizona Cardinals of the National Football League (NFL). He previously played for the Carolina Panthers, Pittsburgh Steelers, and New Orleans Saints. He played college football for the Northwestern Wildcats before transferring to Auburn Tigers.

== Early life ==
Leota was born in Falefā, Samoa and moved to Asheville, North Carolina at age 7. He attended Asheville High School.

== College career ==
Leota began his college football career at Northwestern and redshirted his true freshman season. He had 2.5 sacks as a redshirt freshman. Leota was named third-team All-Big Ten Conference during his redshirt sophomore season. He entered the NCAA transfer portal at the end of the regular season.

Leota ultimately transferred to Auburn. He made 23 tackles with ten tackles for loss and seven sacks in his first season with the team. Leota suffered a season-ending pectoral injury in the fifth game of the Tigers' 2022 season.

== Professional career ==
Pre-draft measurables
Height	Weight	Arm length	Hand span	Wingspan
6 ft 3 in (1.91 m)	252 lb (114 kg)	33 1/2 in (0.85 m)	9 1/2 in (0.24 m)	6 ft 7 3/4 in (2.03 m)
All values from NFL Combine

=== Carolina Panthers ===
Leota was signed by the Carolina Panthers as an undrafted free agent on April 29, 2023. On August 29, he was waived for final roster cuts, but signed to the Panthers' practice squad the following day. Leota was promoted to the active roster on November 13.

On September 17, 2024, Leota was waived by the Panthers, and re-signed to the practice squad. He was then released again on September 24.

=== Pittsburgh Steelers ===
On October 1, 2024, Leota was signed to the Pittsburgh Steelers practice squad. He signed a reserve/future contract with Pittsburgh on January 14, 2025. On August 26, Leota was waived by the Steelers as part of final roster cuts.

=== New Orleans Saints ===
On September 2, 2025, Leota was signed to the New Orleans Saints practice squad. He made three appearances for New Orleans as a practice squad elevation, recording one tackle. On November 25, Leota was waived by the Saints.

=== Arizona Cardinals ===
On December 2, 2025, Leota was signed to the Arizona Cardinals' practice squad. He signed a reserve/future contract on January 5, 2026.
