= Jeoffrey Pagan =

American football player (born 1993)

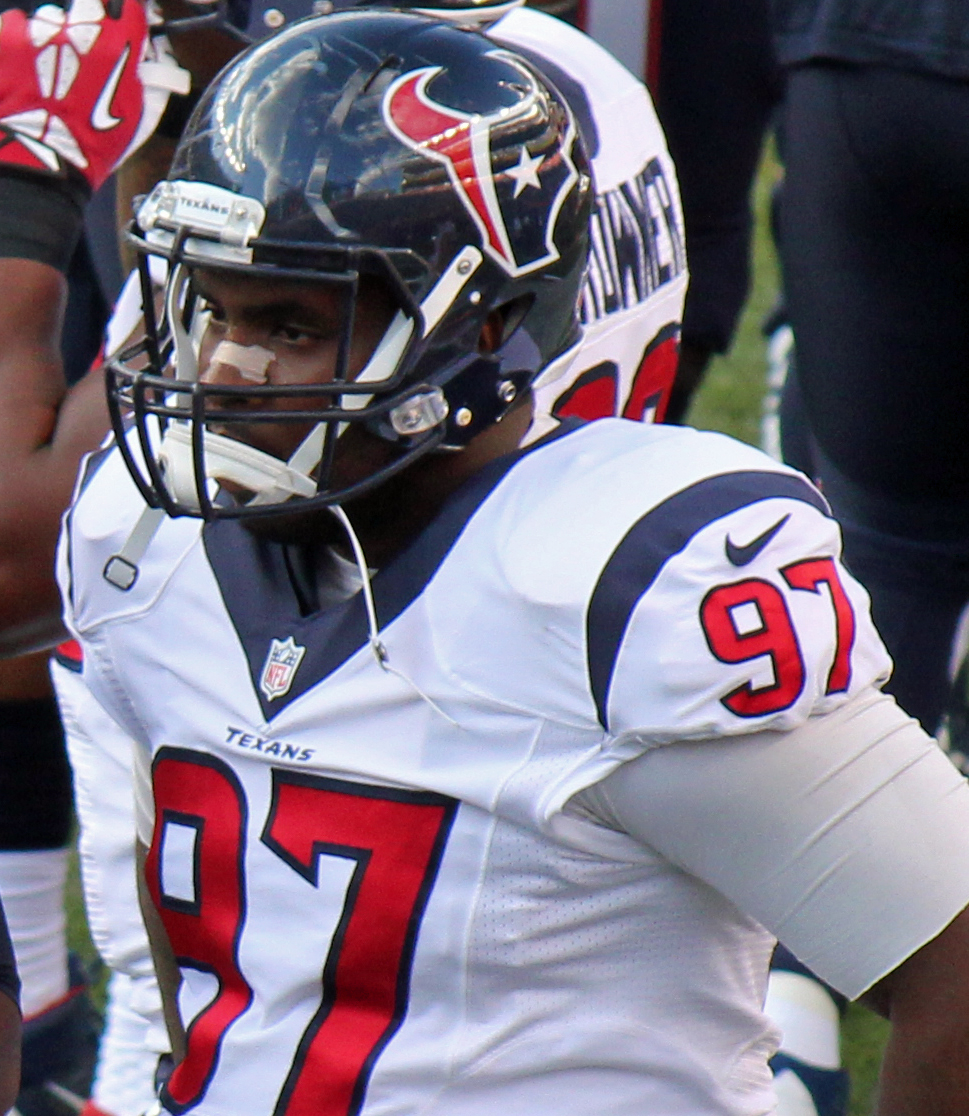
- Pagan with the Houston Texans in 2014

No. 97
- Position: Defensive end

Personal information
- Born: June 10, 1992 (age 34); Asheville, North Carolina, U.S.
- Listed height: 6 ft 3 in (1.91 m)
- Listed weight: 310 lb (141 kg)

Career information
- High school: Asheville
- College: Alabama
- NFL draft: 2014: 6th round, 177th overall pick

Career history
- Houston Texans (2014–2015)

Awards and highlights
- BCS national champion (2011, 2012)

Career NFL statistics
- Total tackles: 11
- Stats at Pro Football Reference

Jeoffrey Pagan (born June 10, 1993) is an American former professional football player who was a defensive end for the Houston Texans of the National Football League (NFL). He was selected by the Houston Texans in the sixth round of the 2014 NFL draft. He played college football for the Alabama Crimson Tide and was a member of their 2011 and 2012 national championship teams.

Pagan played in 22 regular season games for the Texans over two seasons as a backup before being released.

== Early life ==
Jeoffrey Pagan was born on June 10, 1993, in Asheville, North Carolina. He attended Asheville High School.

== College career ==
Pagan was a part of two Alabama teams that won the National Championship in the 2011 and 2012 seasons. His role expanded in the 2013 season. In January 2014, Pagan announced his intention to forgo his senior year and enter the 2014 NFL draft. He was ranked as one of the top defensive end prospects of his draft class.

=== College statistics ===
Year	GP–GS	Tackles				Sacks	Pass defense				Fumbles		Blocked
Year	GP–GS	Solo	Ast	Total	Loss–Yards	No–Yards	Int–Yards	BU	PD	QBH	No–Yards	FF	Kick
2011	6–0	0	4	4	0–0	0–0	0–0	0	0	0	0–0	0	0
2012	14–0	10	13	23	4–17	1.5–6	0–0	0	0	2	0–0	1	0
2013	12–12	17	17	34	3.5–12	2–12	0–0	0	0	4	0–0	0	1
Total		27	34	61	7.5–29	3.5–18	0–0	0	0	6	0–0	1	1

== Professional career ==
Pre-draft measurables
Height	Weight	Arm length	Hand span
6 ft 3 1/2 in (1.92 m)	310 lb (141 kg)	33 in (0.84 m)	9 5/8 in (0.24 m)
All values from NFL Combine

Pagan was selected by the Houston Texans in the sixth round, 177th overall, in the 2014 NFL draft.

As a rookie, Pagan appeared in 16 games in the 2014 season. In the 2015 season, he appeared in six games. On August 30, 2016, Pagan was waived by the Texans.
