= Jeffrey Evans =

- Origin: Memphis
- Occupation: singer/songwriter

Jeffrey Evans is a singer and songwriter best known for his Memphis, Tennessee based bands: '68 Comeback, the Gibson Bros., South Filthy, and his current solo career. Evans' musical style combines elements of rockabilly, blues, garage rock, punk, and rock & roll.

In 2007 a documentary profiling Evans, The Man Who Loved Couch Dancing, was released.

== Discography ==
=== Solo ===
- I've Lived a Rich Life (2001)

=== Monsieur Jeffrey Evans and His Southern Aces ===
- "Spread a Joyful Noise" (2008)

=== Collaborations ===
==== with Walter Daniels and the Oblivians ====
- "Melissa’s Garage Revisited" (2000)

==== with Ross Johnson ====
- Vanity Session (2014)
