= '68 Comeback =

American garage rock band

- Origin: Memphis, Tennessee, United States
- Genres: Rock, garage rock, punk blues
- Years active: 1992—present
- Labels: Sugar Ditch Records, In the Red, Sympathy for the Record Industry, Sub Pop
- Members: Monsieur Jeffrey Evans; Brendan Lee Spengler; George Reyes; Jeff Bouck; Nick Diablo
- Past members: Peggy O'Neil; Darin Lin Wood; Dan Brown; Jack Taylor; Greg Cartwright; Ross Johnson; Walter Daniels; Eric Friedl; Jack Yarber; Jeff Bouck

'68 Comeback is an American garage rock band formed in Memphis, Tennessee, in 1992 by singer, songwriter, and musicologist Jeffrey Evans. For the purposes of the band, Evans is frequently billed as either "Monsieur Evans" or "Monsieur Jeffrey Evans". The group contains a revolving cast of musicians, the only constant member being Evans himself.

== History ==
The initial '68 Comeback lineup consisted of Monsieur Evans on vocals, guitar, and blues harp; Jack Taylor of the Monster Truck Five and Darin Lin Wood of the Red Devils on guitar; ex-Gloryhole member, Dan Brown, on bass; and Peggy O'Neil, formerly of The Gories, on drums. With this lineup the band released a number of well-received 7" singles and then began the first leg of a 60-day, 42-city U.S. tour. The tour immediately ran into problems when drummer Peggy O'Neil was unable to perform, leaving the band without a drummer in the midst of a cross-country tour. This position was eventually filled by then-Compulsive Gamblers and future Oblivians frontman Greg Cartwright.

With the success of their first tour under their belt, the band re-entered the studio, completing their first EP, Paper Boy Blues, in 1993, and their first album, Mr. Downchild, in 1994. The band continued its rigorous release schedule, issuing a number of 7" before heading back into the studio, this time with Walter Daniels and backed by former stand-in drummer Greg Cartwright's Oblivians for what would eventually become the Walter Daniels Plays With Monsieur Jeffrey Evans & The Oblivians At Melissa's Garage EP, later re-released with additional tracks as "Melissa's Garage Revisited."

In 1998, following a number of personnel changes, the band released the 21-track double LP, A Bridge Too Fuckin' Far. The album was dedicated to original guitarist Jack Taylor who had recently died of a drug overdose. This album was followed in 1999 by Love Always Wins, an album primarily of cover songs which is widely considered to be the band's most accessible album to date.

The 2000s saw '68 Comeback on hiatus as Monsieur Evans pursued a solo career, releasing albums with the C.C. Riders, the Porch Ghouls, and eventually reuniting with Walter Daniels and ex-Oblivian, Jack Yarber, in the band South Filthy.

== Discography ==
=== Singles ===
- "3 X Loser" 7" (Sugar Ditch, 1992, SD-003)
- "Memphis" 7" (Sympathy For The Record Industry, 1993, SFTRI 215)
- "It Gets A Little Red" 7" (In The Red, 1993, ITR 016)
- "Peepin' & Hidin'" 7" (Casting Couch, 1993, CCR-010)
- "You Could Call Me Job" 7" (Sub Pop, 1993, SP 216)
- "Flip, Flop and Fly" 7" (Get Hip, 1994, GH-168)
- "Do The Rub" 7" (Bag Of Hammers, 1994, BOH 021)
- "Great Million Sellers "Rocks The Oldies"" 7" (1+2 Records, 1994, 1+2 EP 053)
- "Tobacco Road Part 1" 7" (Sympathy For The Record Industry, 1994, SFTRI 292)
- "High School Confidential" 7" (PCP Records, 1995, PCP-014)
- "Someday My Prince Will Come ...." 2× 7" (Sympathy For The Record Industry, 1996, SFTRI 390)
- "The Annex Sessions, Volume One" 7" (Sympathy For The Record Industry, 1996, SFTRI 450)
- "The Annex Sessions, Volume Two" 7" (Sympathy For The Record Industry, 1997, SFTRI 451)

=== Albums ===
- Paper Boy Blues 10" (Sympathy For The Record Industry, 1993, SFTRI 258)
- Mr. Downchild LP/CD (Sympathy For The Record Industry, 1994, SFTRI 277)
- Golden Rogues Collection CD (Sympathy For The Record Industry, 1994, SFTRI 321)
- Walter Daniels Plays With Monsieur Jeffrey Evans & The Oblivians At Melissa's Garage 10" (Undone, 1995, UDR-0008-10)
- A Bridge Too Fuckin' Far 2xLP/CD (Sympathy For The Record Industry, 1998, SFTRI 422)
- Love Always Wins LP/CD (Sympathy For The Record Industry, 1999, SFTRI 574)
- Melissa's Garage Revisited LP/CD (Sympathy For The Record Industry, 1999, SFTRI 590)

=== Compilations ===
- PCP Generics CD (PCP Records, 1995, PCP-022)
- The Sore Losers Soundtrack 2xLP/CD (Sympathy For The Record Industry, 1997, SFTRI 338)
- Shine On, Sweet Starlet LP/CD (Sympathy For The Record Industry, 1998, SFTRI 537)
- Killed By The Blues CD (P-Vine, 1999, PCD-5486)
- I Hate Music CD (P-Vine, 1999, PCD-5489)
- Their Sympathetic Majesties Request: Volume 2 2xLP/2xCD (Sympathy For The Record Industry, 2003, SFTRI 300)
- A History Of Memphis Garage Rock: The '90s CD (Shangri-La Records, 2003, shangri-la 037)
- Root Damage 2xLP (Sympathy For The Record Industry, 2003, SFTRI 713)
- Root Damage 2xCD (Sympathy For The Record Industry, 2003, SFTRI 713)
