= Nancy Sales Cash =

American novelist

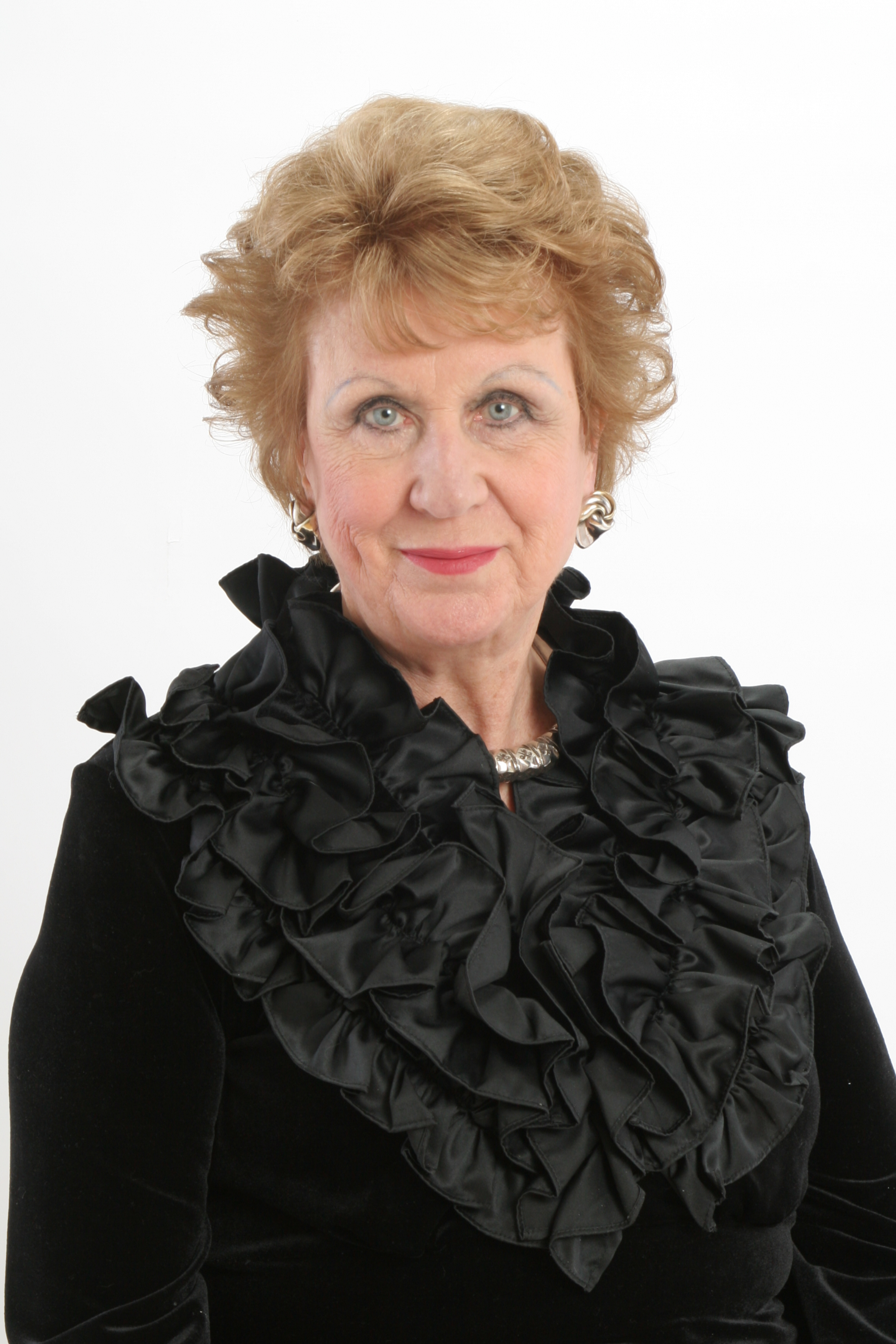
- Nancy Sales Cash
- Born: Nancy Sales; March 28, 1940 (age 85); North Carolina, United States
- Education: University of North Carolina at Chapel Hill (BA)
- Occupations: Novelist; journalist; television producer
- Known for: Dell Publishing, Young & Rubicam, Cash Harmon Television
- Spouse: Don Cash of Cash Harmon Television

Nancy Sales Cash (born March 28, 1940, in North Carolina, United States) is an American novelist, journalist and television producer. A native of North Carolina, her career includes journalism (Dell Publishing Co. Inc.), advertising and public relations (Young & Rubicam Inc.), and television production (Cash Harmon Television) in North Carolina, New York, London and Sydney.

The popular Australian television show Number 96, which Cash Harmon produced, ran for five years, and is still subject of a cult following. It was Australia's highest rated program in 1973 and 1974, and was the first English-language soap opera to be broadcast every weeknight. Nancy took over the company after the death of her husband Don Cash in 1973.

Having lived in Sydney, Australia for over twenty years, she has returned to her native western North Carolina to write novels about the magnificent Great Smoky Mountains and their history, culture and people. Her first novel was published by Pan Macmillan and optioned by an international film company. A graduate of the University of North Carolina at Chapel Hill, with a B.A. in English Literature, she lives in Asheville, North Carolina and Juno Beach, Florida with her husband Charles L. Reid and their cat "Shah."

== Books ==
Novels:

- Murdering Oscar Wilde (2013) ISBN 9781931575829 - Old Mountain Press
- Ritual River (2006) ISBN 9781597150200 Chapel Hill Press INc.
- Patterns of the Heart (1995)

Short Stories and Anthologies:

- Christmas Presence (2002)
- Clothes Lines
- Summer of Love
- Cherokee County, N.C. (2011)
