= Abby the Spoon Lady =

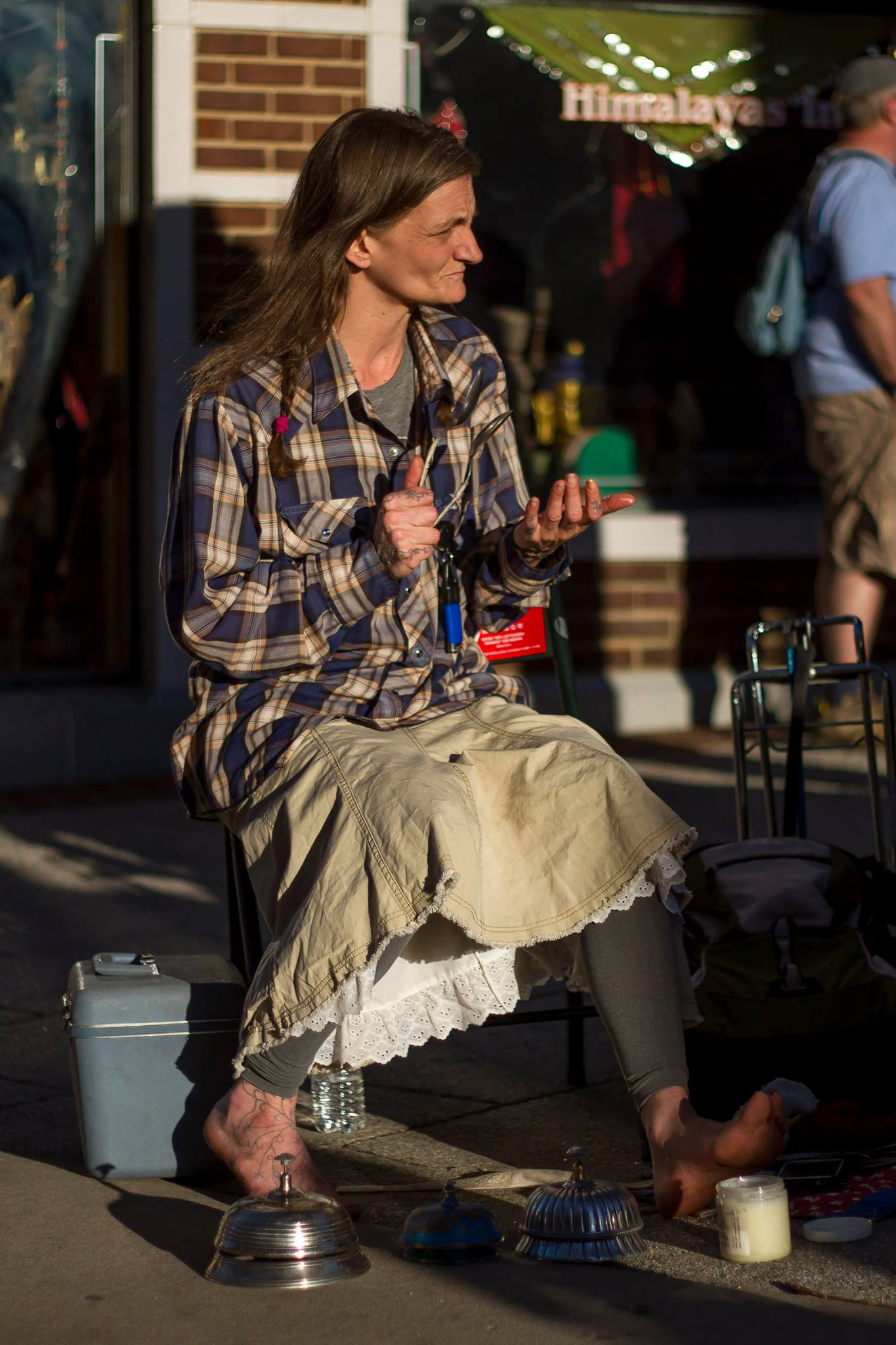
- Abby the Spoon Lady performing in Asheville, North Carolina (2014)

Background information
- Born: Abby Roach; 29 October 1981 (age 44); Wichita, Kansas, United States
- Origin: Wichita, Kansas, United States
- Genres: American folk, American roots
- Occupations: musician; free speech activist; percussionist; storyteller; radio personality
- Instruments: Spoons, musical saw
- Years active: 2002–present
- Website: spoonlady.com

Abby Roach (born October 29, 1981, in Wichita, Kansas), known by her stage name Abby The Spoon Lady, is an American musician, former radio personality, and free speech activist. Her music focuses on the American roots genre.

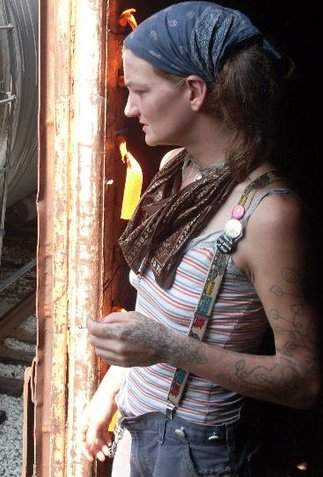
Abby the Spoon Lady on a freight train (2007)

== History ==
Abby first started street performing and busking as a means to make money traveling across the United States, primarily hopping freight trains. She taught herself to play the spoons and traveled all over the United States by hitchhiking and railroad. She states that landing in Asheville, North Carolina, was completely an accident and that she took the wrong train. She also hosted storytelling events, where she discusses the lifestyle of the American hobo. She spent a good amount of her time traveling recording the stories, interviews and songs of other American travelers.

Abby is an advocate for street performance and free speech. In 2014, she was instrumental in developing a group called the Asheville Buskers Collective which advocates for street performance within the city of Asheville, North Carolina. She also recorded buskers through a local Asheville program called Busker Broadcast, which included interviews and songs of travelers passing through Asheville. She has four children, two of whom she put up for adoption. Their names are Alex, Charlotte, Samuel, and Penelope (whose name was later changed to Hope)

In 2012, she was filmed in the horror film Jug Face playing spoons, and in 2015 she was filmed for Buskin' Blues, a documentary about the street performance scene in Asheville.

In 2019, Abby made the decision to leave the area and return to her native Kansas. She cited the transformation of Asheville into a high-end tourist attraction, as the primary motivating factor:

"Since the tourism boom, the majority of our street performers are making half as much as before the tourism boom," she said.

Roach said the final straw came when city leaders approved a measure to turn the historic Flatiron Building, a favorite location for street performers, into a high-end hotel.

"Responsible tourism needs to happen, making sure the locals are taken care of. If you have a giant room full of people begging you not to approve a hotel, then you don't approve it," Roach said, adding the Asheville she knew and loved no longer exists.

"There's been a good amount of street performers who have wanted to create an Asheville home base and couldn't because they could never find anywhere to live. So, it's stopping the flow of new art coming in."

Roach said, while she will always have a connection to Asheville, she will head back to Wichita, Kansas, where she can pursue her creative passions.

=== Radio ===
Abby the Spoon Lady hosted a radio show on WSFM-LP in Asheville, North Carolina called Busker Broadcast, which centered around street performance and public space law.

=== Genre ===
Her repertoire consists of a mix of Americana, early jazz, ragtime for string instruments, country blues, jug band, Western swing, Vaudeville, and Appalachian folk.

=== Influences ===
Musicians who have influenced her include Artis the Spoonman, Jimmie Rodgers, Hank Williams, Bill Monroe, Milton Brown and the Musical Brownies, Sleepy John Estes, Fats Waller, and Emmett Miller.
