= Asheville High School =

Historic school building in North Carolina, United States

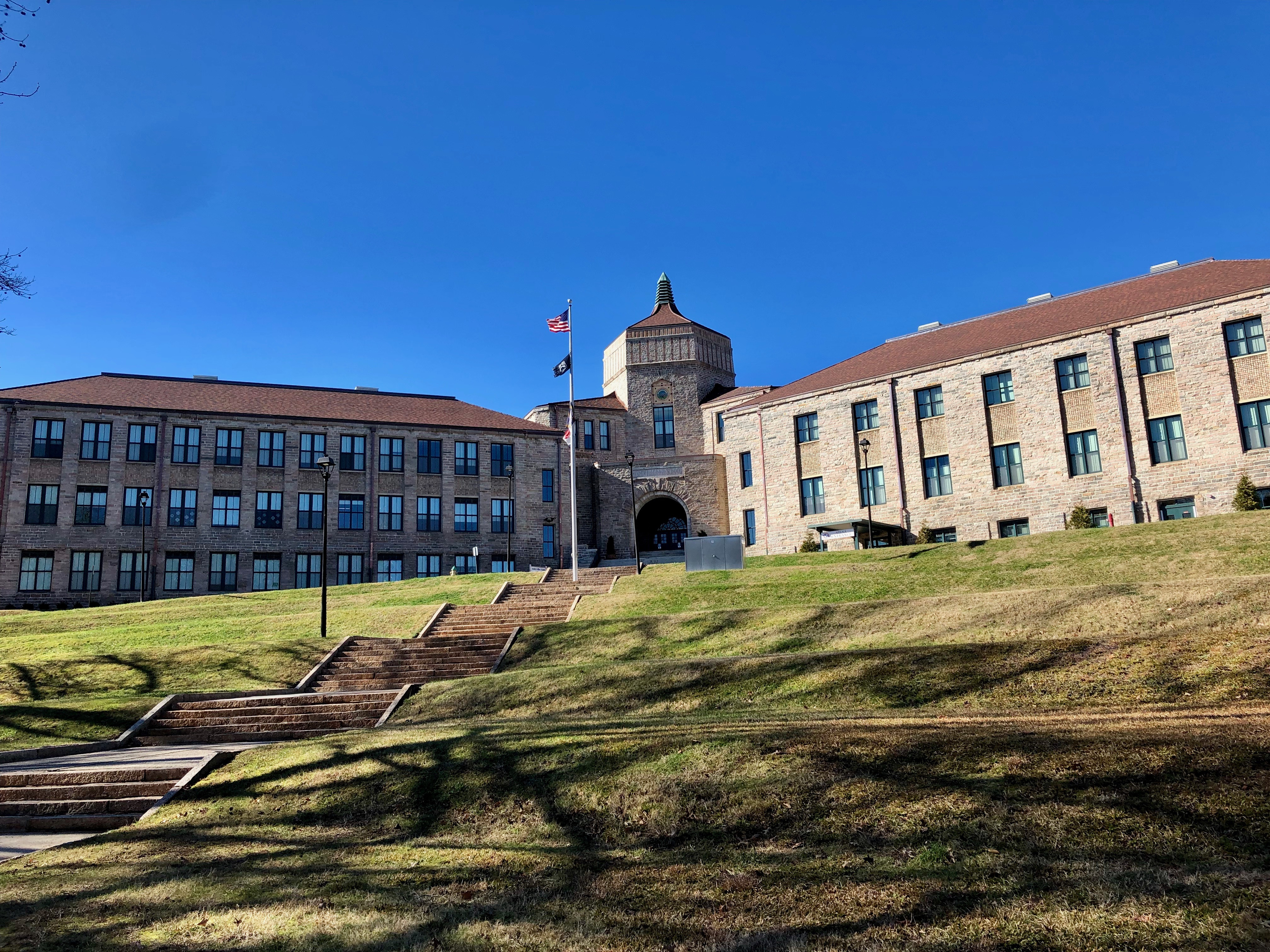
- Asheville High School, January 2019

Location
- 419 McDowell Street; Asheville, North Carolina 28803; United States; 35°34′20″N 82°33′07″W

Information
- Former names: Lee H. Edwards High School (1935–1969)
- Type: Public
- Established: 1929 (97 years ago)
- School district: Asheville City Schools
- CEEB code: 340140
- Teaching staff: 87.87 (FTE)
- Grades: 9–12
- Enrollment: 1,165 (2023–2024)
- Student to teacher ratio: 13.26
- Colors: Cardinal, black, white
- Mascot: Fighting Cougar
- Website: ahs.ashevillecityschools.net
- Asheville High School
- U.S. National Register of Historic Places
- U.S. Historic district
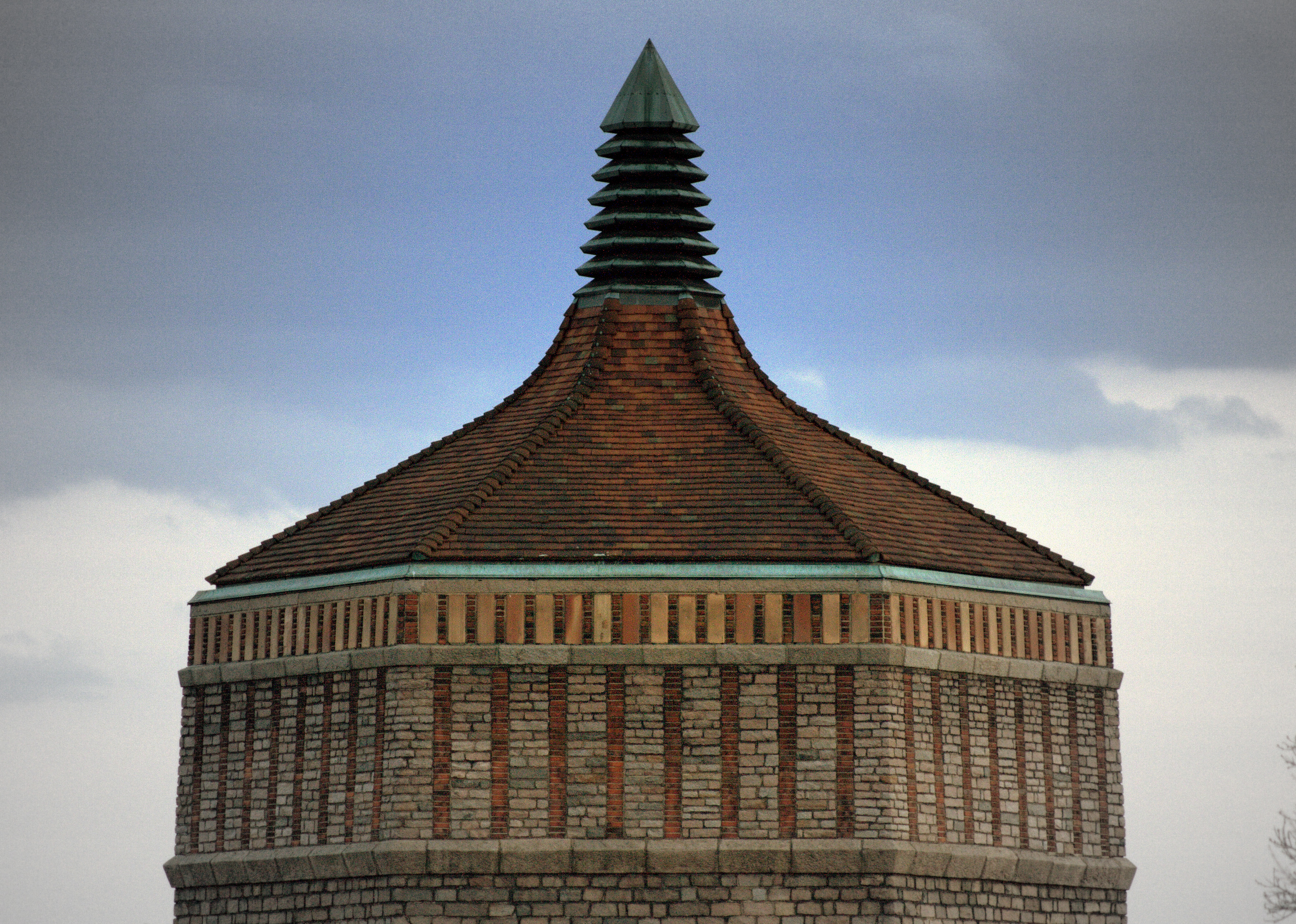
- Spire of the Main Building of Asheville High School

- Location within North Carolina Location within the United States
- Location: 419 McDowell St., Asheville, North Carolina
- Built: 1929
- Architect: Ellington, Douglas; Palmer-Spivey, et al.
- Architectural style: Art Deco, Italian Renaissance
- NRHP reference No.: 96000481
- Added to NRHP: April 26, 1996

Asheville High School is a public high school located in Asheville, North Carolina, United States and is one of two secondary schools in the Asheville City Schools system. Designed by Douglas Ellington, construction of the original building began in 1927 and was completed two years later. The modern addition was built in 1970 and a new cafeteria was finished in 2006. There is a second school located at the same address; the School of Inquiry and Life Sciences at Asheville (SILSA).

== History ==
After the railroad system reached Asheville in 1881, the population of the city grew from 2,000 to 10,000. In response to this population influx, Asheville began a public school system in 1888, which originally consisted of a high school and three elementary schools. The elementary schools were the Orange Street School (currently occupied by NC DOT offices), Queen Carson Elementary School (currently occupied by a bus garage) and Montford Avenue School (replaced by the current William Randolph Elementary in the early 1950s). The high school was located at the corner of Broadway and Woodfin Street, in what had been the private home of Nicholas Woodfin. After use for educational purposes ceased about 1923 this structure was the downtown YMCA until a new structure was built further east on Woodfin about 1970, and the old building torn down. The former high school campus is currently occupied by a bank.

The City of Asheville built two structures in the early 1920s, Hall Fletcher in West Asheville and David Millard, on Oak Street, adjacent to First Baptist Church, which, together, were known as Asheville High School. The David Millard Campus occupied a portion of the grounds of a former girls' school, with the balance of the former school grounds covered by the Church. Athletic teams and extracurricular clubs were drawn from both campuses. The former site of David Millard is currently covered by One Oak Plaza and the extension of Charlotte Street, and the West Asheville campus is currently occupied by a new Hall Fletcher Elementary School. The current University of North Carolina at Asheville began in 1927 as a two-year college, known as Asheville-Biltmore College, using classrooms on the ground floor of David Millard.

The population of Asheville continued to grow in the late 1920s. By 1926 the school board agreed that "a large, central high school plant" was needed. A committee formed to locate a suitable location reported that it found "only one site within the City of sufficient size, and of reasonable price … this tract of land lies between Victoria Road and the new McDowell Street." Out of seven architects submitting proposals for the new high school, Douglas D. Ellington was selected by majority vote. In addition Nickolaus Louis Englehardt of Columbia University was hired as an advisor to the architect. Englehardt had worked a great deal in school planning and design on a national level. Ellington and Englehardt's collaboration made the new Asheville High a model facility in terms of architecture and educational offerings. The former Asheville High School was renamed David Millard Junior High School and, together with Hall Fletcher, served as the city's junior high schools for a time.

With a cost of $1.3 million ($18.8 million in 2016 dollars) Asheville High School opened on February 5, 1929, with a dedication ceremony in the auditorium including as speakers the Mayor of Asheville, the superintendent of Asheville City Schools, Douglas Ellington, Lee H. Edwards, the president of the PTA, the Headmaster of the Asheville School and the president of Duke University. When first opened, Asheville High had a wide variety of vocational programs including automotive mechanics, full print shops (all yearbooks, newspapers, and magazines were printed on-campus), mechanical drawing, and photography, including a darkroom.

When the stock market crashed in October 1929, it took Asheville by surprise. This forced the programming for the schools, and indeed the city's economic well-being, to hit rock bottom. For a time, Asheville High was closed, and students were removed to David Millard and Hall Fletcher. All extras were cut for a time, including much of the school's technical curriculum. In 1935 the school was renamed Lee H. Edwards High School in honor of Principal Edwards, who died unexpectedly that year. The name "Asheville High School" returned with integration in 1969.

In 1949, another vocational facility (known today as the ROTC building) was created across from the original shop wing. This facility was built by students in the vocational program, as a real-world example of construction. In 1968, another larger vocational building was built. In the early 1970s, a media center addition was added to the main building. In 1973, a new gym and athletic facility was attached to the old vocational building. In the early 1990s, a $3.5 million cultural arts building was built. Finally, in 2006, a new $3.1 million cafeteria was added to the campus.

On October 5, 2008, then Senator Barack Obama visited Asheville High School in his race for the White House. Over 25,000 people showed up at the Football Stadium to see Obama deliver his rally speech.

In 2016, city school officials identified $25 million in needed repairs. The biggest problem was the roof, with thousands of clay tiles which would all have to be removed (and possibly replaced afterward) for the work. Jack Thomson, executive director of the Preservation Society of Asheville and Buncombe County, called the building "a master work of Ellington." Over the next few years a $27 million restoration project was undertaken that included repairs to the mortar work, switching out the copper gutters, and replacing the Ludowici roof tiles.

== Notable alumni ==
- Sarah Addison Allen, author
- John Avery, former NFL and CFL running back
- Crezdon Butler, NFL and CFL cornerback
- Chris Chalk, actor in The Newsroom and Homeland
- Dave Cheadle, former MLB pitcher
- Indigo De Souza, musician, singer, songwriter
- Lawson Duncan, former professional tennis player
- H.K. Edgerton, activist
- Joe Felmet, civil rights advocate
- Sallie Ford, lead singer and guitarist for Sallie Ford and the Sound Outside
- Warren Haynes, musician, singer, and songwriter
- Bill Hendon, author, POW/MIA activist, and two-term Republican U.S. Congressman from North Carolina's 11th district
- Charlie "Choo-Choo" Justice, former NFL running back for the Washington Redskins and College Football Hall of Fame inductee
- MJ Lenderman, musician, singer, songwriter
- Eku Leota, NFL linebacker
- Leonard Little, former NFL defensive end and Super Bowl XXXIV champion with the Saint Louis Rams
- Rhonda Mapp, former WNBA player for Charlotte Sting and Los Angeles Sparks
- Rashanda McCants, former WNBA player for the Minnesota Lynx and Tulsa Shock
- Esther Manheimer, lawyer and long-time mayor of Asheville, North Carolina.
- Mary Montgomery, women's swimmer who competed in the 1972 Summer Olympics
- Jeoffrey Pagan, former NFL defensive end and 2x BCS National Champion with Alabama
- Marisha Pessl, author of Special Topics in Calamity Physics
- Buzz Peterson, former North Carolina Tar Heel's basketball player and former head coach of the UNC Wilmington Seahawks men's basketball team
- Adam Reed, voice actor, writer, director and producer
- Ray Roberts, former NFL offensive tackle
- Caleb Rudow, member of the North Carolina House of Representatives
- Charles Thomas, former MLB player
- Johnny White, former NFL and CFL running back
- William Winkenwerder Jr., CEO of Highmark, the eighth largest health insurer in the United States
- Bellamy Young, American actress
