= Dave Cheadle =

American baseball player (1952-2012)

- Pitcher
- Born: February 19, 1952; Greensboro, North Carolina, U.S.
- Died: February 25, 2012 (aged 60); St. Augustine, Florida, U.S.
- Batted: Left Threw: Left

MLB debut
- September 16, 1973, for the Atlanta Braves

Last MLB appearance
- September 25, 1973, for the Atlanta Braves

MLB statistics
- Win–loss record: 0–1
- Earned run average: 18.00
- Innings pitched: 2
- Stats at Baseball Reference

Teams
- Atlanta Braves (1973)

David Baird Cheadle, Jr. (February 19, 1952 – February 25, 2012) was an American professional baseball player. A 6 ft 2 in (1.88 m), 203 lb (92 kg) left-handed pitcher, he appeared in two Major League games pitched for the 1973 Atlanta Braves. He was born in Greensboro, North Carolina, and attended Asheville High School in Asheville, North Carolina. He attended and graduated from the University of North Carolina at Chapel Hill, after his baseball career ended.

== Career ==
Cheadle was drafted in the first round of the 1970 Major League Baseball draft by the New York Yankees and spent almost four seasons in the Bombers' farm system before his inclusion in an August 1973 trade to that sent veteran right-handed pitcher Pat Dobson to New York from the Braves. Cheadle made his Major League debut on September 16, 1973, at Riverfront Stadium in relief against the eventual National League West Division champion Cincinnati Reds. In the extra-inning contest, he pitched a scoreless 11th inning, retiring Reds stars Pete Rose and Joe Morgan, but issued a base on balls to Denis Menke leading off the 12th, then balked him to second base. Menke would later score on a hit given up by Cheadle's successor on the mound, Adrian Devine, tagging Cheadle with the loss. In his next outing, nine days later, Cheadle pitched one inning in relief of Phil Niekro and surrendered a three-run home run to Ron Cey, insurance runs for Los Angeles Dodgers' starting pitcher Don Sutton in a 5–1 Dodger win. Cheadle never saw any Major League action after 1973.

In two MLB innings pitched, Cheadle allowed four hits, four earned runs, and three bases on balls, two of them intentional. He recorded only one strikeout — but it was against all-time hits leader Rose in Cheadle's MLB debut.

Cheadle died on February 25, 2012, in St. Augustine, Florida, six days after his 60th birthday.
