= Jonathan Rush =

American football player (born 1989)

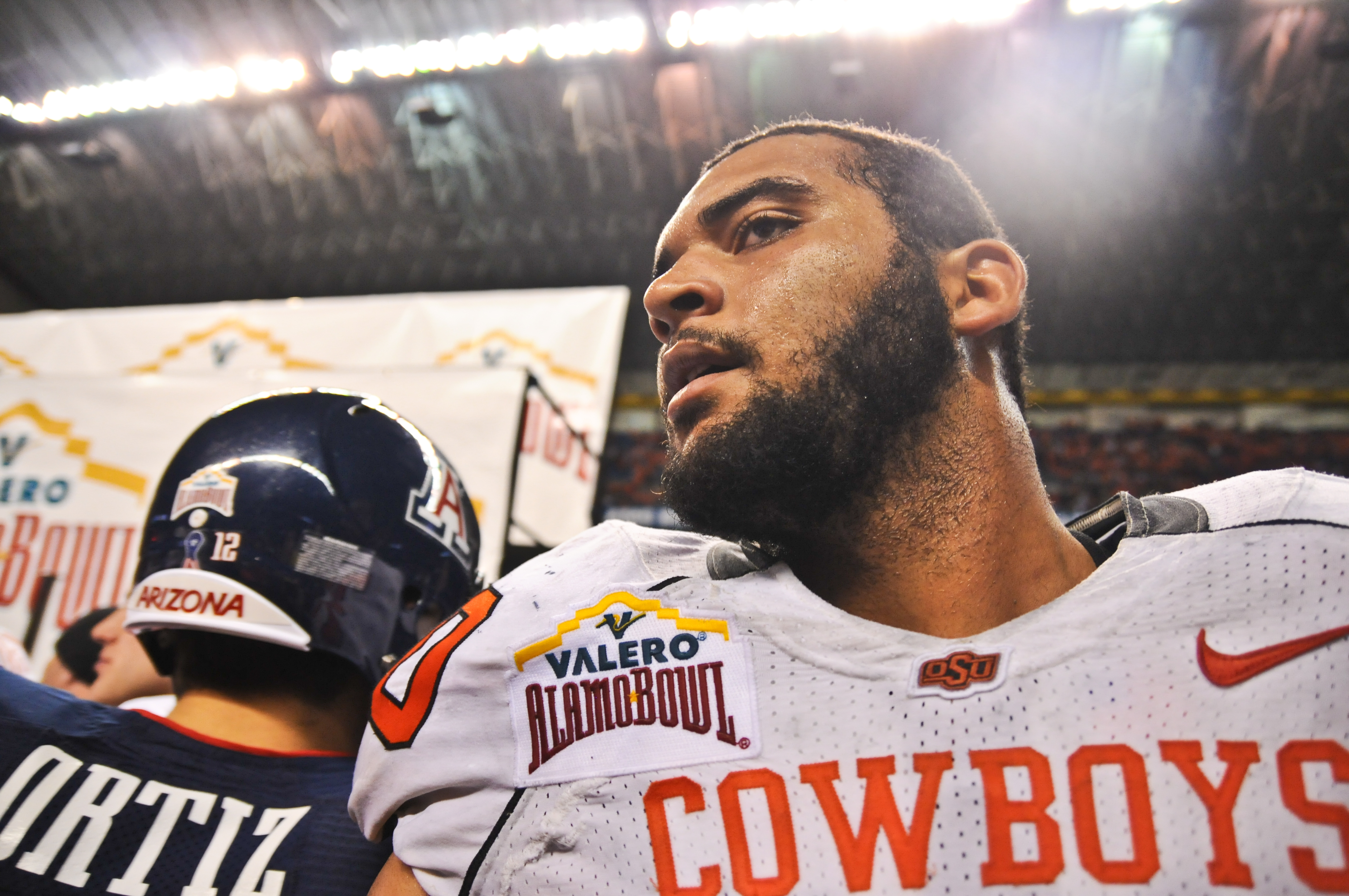

No. 70
- Position: Offensive guard

Personal information
- Born: January 3, 1989 (age 37); Asheville, North Carolina, U.S.
- Listed height: 6 ft 4 in (1.93 m)
- Listed weight: 314 lb (142 kg)

Career information
- High school: Killeen (Killeen, Texas)
- College: Oklahoma State (2007–2011)

Jonathan Rush (born January 3, 1989) is an American former college football player who was an offensive lineman for the Oklahoma State Cowboys.

== Early life ==
Rush was born in Asheville, North Carolina.

Rush attended Killeen High School in Killeen, Texas, where he was Texas Football Magazine's Top 25 Offensive Line Prospect, Scout.com's No. 51 Offensive Tackle Prospect, and 1st Team All District; Jr. season. Rivals.com listed him as the 69th best overall recruit. Considered a three-star prospect by Scout.com, and deemed to have pro-potential by Rivals.com Rush was recruited by a number of schools including Florida and Texas Tech. He committed to Oklahoma State in 2007.

Rush was awarded offensive MVP for Killeen High School after his senior season finishing with 40 pancake blocks and 35 knockdowns.

== College career ==
As a redshirt freshman, Rush played in 5 games in 2008 (Washington State, Missouri State, Troy, Baylor and Iowa State). Rush was set to be a starter for his sophomore season before a pre-camp injury sidelined him for the season.

As a junior in 2010, Rush started all 13 games for the Cowboys including the Alamo Bowl. In week 10, #22 Baylor visited Oklahoma State and Rush made the highlight reel after going downfield for a monster block. During the season, Rush was recognized as the most physical lineman for OSU four times and offensive lineman of the week 3 times (Tulsa, Louisiana-Lafayette, and Baylor). As a result of his solid play throughout the 2010 season, Rush received an honorable mention for All Big 12 by the Associated Press. Rush was part of the offense which finished No. 1 in the nation (not including bowl games) for total offense with 537.6 yards per game. Through the entire 2010 football season, the offensive line only gave up 10 sacks in 13 games which was tied for 8th best in the nation. Oklahoma State also finished 2nd in the nation for total pass offense while averaging 345.85 yards per game through the air and 3rd in scoring averaging 44.23 points per game.

Rush began his senior year as part of an offensive line returning 5 starters. He majored in sociology.
