= Terry Roberts (author) =

American writer and educator (born 1956)

- Born: July 30, 1956 (age 70); Asheville, North Carolina, U.S.
- Occupation: author

Terry Lee Roberts (born July 30, 1956) is an American novelist and educator. He is the author of seven novels, most of which flow out of his heritage in southern Appalachia. He has also written extensively about American public education, specifically the teaching of critical and creative thinking via Socratic discussion. He lives in Asheville, North Carolina with his wife, Lynn.

== Early life and education ==
Roberts was born in Asheville, North Carolina in 1956 and lived near the small mountain town of Weaverville. He went to local public schools and earned degrees from the University of North Carolina at Asheville (BA), Duke University (MAT), and the University of North Carolina at Chapel Hill (PhD). His family has lived in the mountains of Western North Carolina since the American Revolutionary War, farming in Madison County, North Carolina along the French Broad River. The town of Hot Springs in Madison county is a setting in his novels.

== Career ==
After earning an MAT from Duke University in 1979, Roberts taught high school English for nine years before returning to graduate school at the University of North Carolina at Chapel Hill, where he earned a PhD with a dissertation on the fiction of Elizabeth Spencer. He is also a scholar of John Ehle and Thomas Wolfe.

He is the director emeritus of the National Paideia Center, an educational reform institute devoted to creating schools that are both more rigorous and more equitable. During his time as Director of the Paideia Center from 1992 to 2025, Roberts served as a consultant on the role of Socratic seminar dialogue in the classroom, educational leadership, and organizational development. He has written extensively about classroom instruction and, increasingly, about teaching critical and creative thinking in the context of an expanded definition of literacy.

Around 2005, Roberts began to write fiction inspired by the power of the past among people living in the southern Appalachian mountains. His first novel, A Short Time to Stay Here, is set in the mountain community of Hot Springs, North Carolina, during World War I at the time that an internment camp of German detainees was established there, and focuses on the intersection of cultures. A Short Time to Stay Here won the Willie Morris Award for Southern Fiction, and the Sir Walter Raleigh Award for Fiction given annually for the best novel by a North Carolinian. His second, That Bright Land, is set just after the Civil War, and focuses on the deep divisions within a community struggling to recover from the war. It won the Thomas Wolfe Memorial Literary Award and the James Still Award for Writing about the Appalachian South. The Holy Ghost Speakeasy and Revival was published in 2019, and is the story of an evangelist-bootlegger set during prohibition. My Mistress' Eyes Are Raven Black, Roberts' 2021 thriller, is set on Ellis Island in 1920. It continues the story of Stephen Robbins, the narrator of A Short Time to Stay Here. It was a 2022 International Thriller Writers Awards finalist in the Best Paperback Original category. Published in July 2022, The Sky Club, is a novel set in Asheville, North Carolina in the late 1920s and early 1930s at the time of the financial crash.

Roberts' sixth novel, The Devil Hath A Pleasing Shape (2024), continues the story of Stephen Robbins, the narrator of A Short Time To Stay Here and My Mistress' Eyes Are Raven Black. His seventh novel, In the Fullness of Time (2025) is set during the 1960s in Madison County, North Carolina. It was a finalist for the Southern Literary Review Book of the Year for 2025.

In 2019, Roberts was elected to membership in the North Caroliniana Society for his contributions to North Carolina's heritage. The same year, he was appointed President of the Thomas Wolfe Society, an association of scholars of the writer Thomas Wolfe. In 2021, Roberts was named a Director of the North Caroliniana Society and in 2024, became its vice-president.

== Awards ==
- 2012. Willie Morris Award for Southern Fiction for A Short Time to Stay Here.
- 2013. Sir Walter Raleigh Award for fiction for A Short Time to Stay Here.
- 2016. Thomas Wolfe Memorial Literary Award for That Bright Land.
- 2016. Sir Walter Raleigh Award for fiction for That Bright Land.
- 2017. James Still Award for Writing about the American South for That Bright Land.

== Publications ==
=== Novels ===
- Roberts, Terry (2012). A Short Time to Stay Here (softcover) (First ed.). Boone, NC: Ingalls. ISBN 978-1-932158-99-1.
- — (2016) [First published 2012]. A Short Time to Stay Here (hardcover) (2nd ed.). Nashville, TN: Turner. ISBN 978-1-68162-952-0.
- — (2016). That Bright Land (hardcover). Nashville, TN: Turner. ISBN 978-1-63026-976-0. (ISBN 978-1-63026-975-3, paperback).
- — (2019). The Holy Ghost Speakeasy and Revival (hardcover). Nashville, TN: Turner. ISBN 978-1-68442-164-0. (ISBN 978-1-68442-163-3, paperback).
- — (2021). My Mistress' Eyes Are Raven Black (hardcover). Nashville, TN: Turner. ISBN 978-1-68442-695-9. (ISBN 978-1-68442-694-2, paperback).
- — (2022). The Sky Club. Nashville, TN: Turner. ISBN 978-1-68442-852-6.
- — (2024). The Devil Hath A Pleasing Shape (hardcover). Nashville, TN: Turner. ISBN 978-1-68442-035-3.
- — (2025). In The Fullness of Time (hardcover). Nashville, TN: Turner. ISBN 979-8-88798-058-4.

=== Literary criticism ===
- Roberts, Terry (1994) [First published 1994]. Self and Community in the Fiction of Elizabeth Spencer (hardcover). Baton Rouge, LA: LSU Press. ISBN 978-0-80711-879-5.
- — (2001) [First published 2001]. Look Homeward, Angel: Literary Masterpieces (hardcover). Farmington Hills, MI: Gale Studies Group. ISBN 978-0-78765-726-0.
- — (1994). "Character Before the Bar: John Ehle's The Widow's Trial". Studies in the Literary Imagination. Vol. XXVII, No 2. pp. 55–62.
- — (1999). "Within the Green Bowl: Community in the Mountain Fiction of John Ehle". Pembroke Magazine. Vol. 31. pp. 90–98.

=== Education ===
- Roberts, Terry (1998). The Power of Paideia Schools: Defining Lives Through Learning (paperback) (First ed.). Alexandria, VA: ASCD. ISBN 978-0-87120-303-8.
- — (2019). The New Smart: How nurturing creativity will help children thrive (hardcover). Nashville, TN: Turner. ISBN 978-1-68442-372-9. (ISBN 978-1-68442-371-2, paperback).
- —; Billings, Laura (1998). The Paideia Classroom: Teaching for Understanding (paperback). Larchmont NY: Eye on Education. ISBN 978-1-88300-160-5. (ISBN 978-1-13843-982-5, hardcover).
- —; — (2008). Discussing First Freedoms: A discussion guide for teachers (paperback). Washington, DC: Freedom Forum First Amendment Center. ISBN 978-0-9801627-0-7.
- —; — (2012). Teaching Critical Thinking: Using Seminars for 21st Century Learning (hardcover). Larchmont, NY: Eye on Education. ISBN 978-1-13813-013-5. (ISBN 978-1-59667-208-6, paperback).
- —; —; Dougherty, Eleanor (2016). The Better Writing Breakthrough:Connecting Student Thinking and Discussion to inspire great writing (paperback). Alexandria VA: ASCD. ISBN 978-1-41661-884-3.

=== Articles ===
- Roberts, Terry (2020). "Opening up the conversation - and students' thinking". Educational Leadership. Vol. 77, no. 7. pp. 52–57.
- "Fact and Fancy in Historical Fiction". The Great Smokies Review (21). 2019.
- "Webinar: Using Discussion to Inspire Writing". Association for Supervision and Curriculum Development. 2016.
- Roberts, Terry; Billings, Laura (2009). "Speak Up and Listen". Phi Delta Kappan. Vol. 91, no. 2. pp. 81–85.
- —; — (2008). "Thinking is Literacy, Literacy Thinking". Educational Leadership. Vol. 65, no. 5. pp. 32–36.
- —; — (2006). "Planning, Practice, and Assessment in the Paideia Classroom". High School Journal. Vol. 90, no. 1. pp. 1–8.
- —; — (2006). "Asheville Middle School: A 6-8 Community of Conscience and Intellect". Middle School Journal. Vol. 37, no. 5. pp. 31–39.
- — (2004). "The Discipline of Wonder". Education Week, editorial. Vol. September.
- —; Trainor, Audrey (2004). "Performing for Yourself and Others: the Paideia Coached Project". Phi Delta Kappan. Vol. 85, no. 7. pp. 513–519.
- — (2002). "Learn to Care, Care to Learn". Educational Leadership. Vol. 60, no. 1. pp. 45–48.
- — (2001). "His Life a Reminder of our Humanity (eulogy for Mortimer Adler)". Education Week. Vol. September.
- — (1995). "Practicing What We Preach, editorial". Education Week. Vol. February.
- — (2019). "In Memoriam: The Journey of John Ehle". North Carolina Literary Review.
