= Helen Morris Lewis =

American suffragist

Helen Morris Lewis (December 7, 1852 – August 19, 1933) was an American suffragist based in North Carolina. She was the first woman in North Carolina to seek elected office, when she ran for a municipal office in Asheville in 1899.

== Early life ==
Helen Morris Lewis was born in Charleston, South Carolina, one of the ten children of John Williams Lewis and Anna Raven Vander Horst Lewis. She was a descendant of Lewis Morris, signer of the Declaration of Independence, and also of Arnoldus Vander Horst, an eighteenth-century South Carolina governor. During the American Civil War, she fled Charleston for Columbia, South Carolina with her family; her mother died in childbirth during their flight, and the surviving children sought refuge in Aiken. After the war, she attended St. Mary's School.

== Career ==
As a young woman, Helen Morris Lewis gave recitals as an elocutionist in various states, to some critical acclaim, with newspapers noting her "undoubted dramatic talent." Her tour was marred when she was the victim of fraud.

In the 1890s, she and her sister Raven, both unmarried, started a boarding house in Asheville. They also taught music to supplement their income. In 1894, the Lewis sisters gathered several dozen residents of Asheville, men and women, at the mayor's house, and founded North Carolina's first equal suffrage association. Helen Morris Lewis was elected president of the association. The following year she attended the National American Woman Suffrage Association meeting in Atlanta, Georgia, representing North Carolina, and returned in 1896 when the meeting was held in Washington, D. C. She also spoke to the Senate Committee on Woman Suffrage during that trip. "I want to vote because so long as women are prevented from legislation, so long will they be cramped and paralyzed by powers over which they have no control," Lewis said to summarize her motivations for suffrage work.

In 1896, Helen Morris Lewis received five votes for a seat in Congress, despite never having run for the office. She did announce her candidacy in 1899 for Superintendent of Waterworks in Asheville, making her the first North Carolina woman to seek elective office. She received four votes. By 1900, the suffrage association she founded had disbanded.

== Personal life ==
Helen Morris Lewis and her sister left Asheville in 1906, and started an inn near Summerville, South Carolina in 1912. Helen died at a summer house in Asheville in 1933; her remains were interred in Charleston at St. Lawrence Catholic Cemetery. She was 80 years old at the time of her death. Her sister Raven Lewis was her heir.
