= Nate Torbett =

American soccer player and coach

Personal information
- Full name: Nathanael David-Hugh Torbett
- Date of birth: September 4, 1994 (age 32)
- Place of birth: Asheville, North Carolina
- Height: 5 ft 9 in (1.75 m)
- Position: Center midfielder

Team information
- Current team: Port City FC (head coach)

College career
Years	Team	Apps	(Gls)
2013-2014	Winthrop University		
2014–2016	Cape Fear Community College		

Senior career*
Years	Team	Apps	(Gls)
2017-2019	Coomera Colts SC	35	(0)
2021	Wilmington Football Club	8	(0)

Managerial career
- 2020-2021: Cape Fear Community College (assistant)
- 2022–: Port City FC
- * Club domestic league appearances and goals

Nathanael Torbett (born September 4, 1994) is an American soccer coach and former player. He is currently the head coach of Port City FC of the National Premier Soccer League.

== Career ==
=== Youth and college ===
Torbett grew up in Asheville, North Carolina where he played for Highland Football Club and North Buncombe High School, winning the first ever North Carolina State Cup for HFC along with helping guide NBHS to a Conference Championship and was named an All-Conference performer each year. As a senior Nate transferred to one of the best soccer programs in the country in Northwestern High School in Rock Hill, South Carolina along with playing for Discoveries Soccer Club. Nate was an All-State and All-Conference performer along with team MVP and represented NHS in the South Carolina North vs. South All-Star game.

Nate started his college career by joining the Winthrop Eagles in the Big South Conference. As a freshman Nate decided to red shirt. He made appearances in many off-season spring games, along with the exhibition games to start the season. Nate later decided to transfer and moved on to Cape Fear Community College in Wilmington, North Carolina. Nate enjoyed a stellar career at CFCC. Setting the school record for games played along with games started.

=== Professional ===
Torbett signed with the Coomera Colts of the Gold Coast Premier League in December 2016.
