= Horatio Sheafe Krans =

American writer

Horatio Sheafe Krans (1872 in Boston – July 28, 1952 in Asheville, North Carolina) was an American writer and editor.

Krans received his A.B. from Columbia University in 1894 and went on to complete a Ph.D. in 1903. He edited the Lincoln Tribute Book (1909), English Love Poems (1909), The Lost Art of Conversation (1910) and was an associate editor of The World's Wit and Humor (ten volumes, 1906). In 1914 he served as associate editor of the New International Yearbook.

He and his wife (1876-1960) lived in Paris for a time until fleeing at the start of the German occupation. They then moved to New York City and finally to Asheville, North Carolina, where Krans died in 1952.

== Selected bibliography ==
- Irish Life in Irish Fiction (1903)
- William Butler Yeats and the Irish Literary Revival (1904)
- Oliver Goldsmith, a Critical Biography (1907)
