= Chris Rodrigues =

American Contemporary Christian music singer, songwriter, multi-instrumentalist

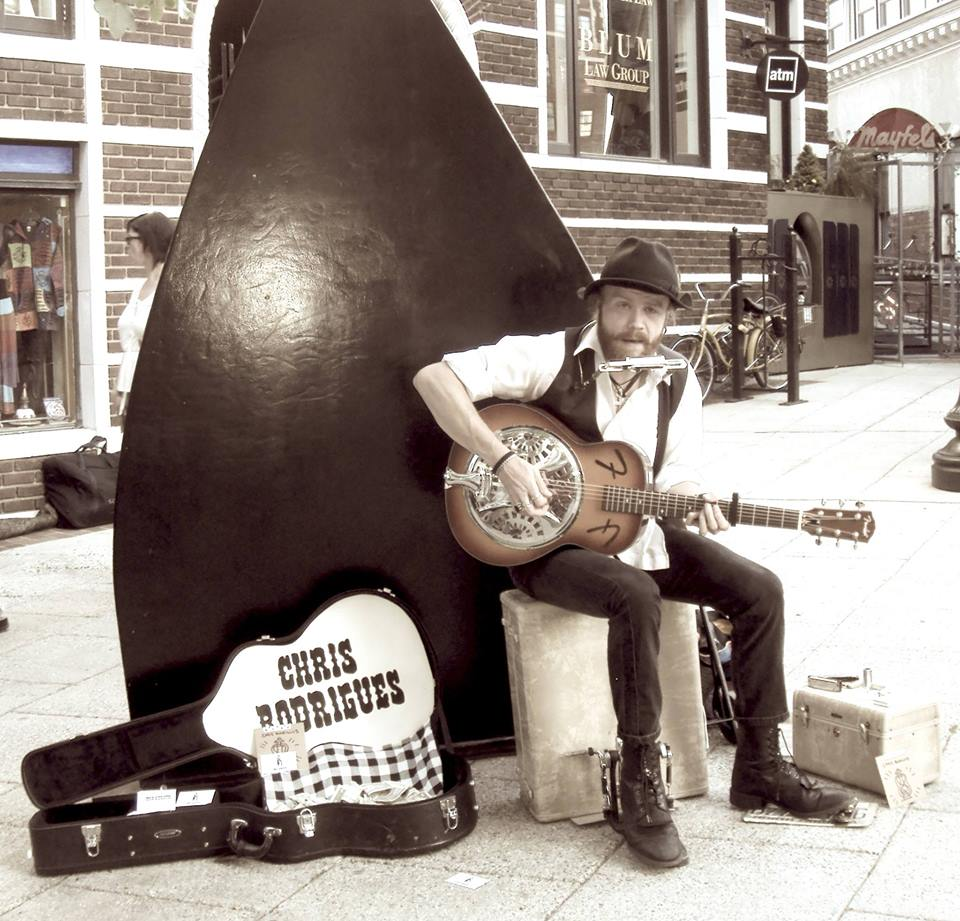
- Chris Rodrigues busking in Asheville NC 2013

Background information
- Born: Chris Rodrigues; June 7, 1989 (age 36); Asheville, North Carolina, U.S.
- Genres: Blues, folk, country, Christian
- Occupation(s): Musician, singer-songwriter
- Instrument(s): Vocals, guitar, banjo, fiddle
- Years active: 2002–present

Chris Rodrigues (born June 7, 1989) is an American Contemporary Christian music singer, songwriter, multi-instrumentalist. He is well known for a viral video titled "Angels in Heaven" with activist and percussionist Abby the Spoon Lady, which reached over 200 million views on Facebook and another ten million views on YouTube.

== Background ==
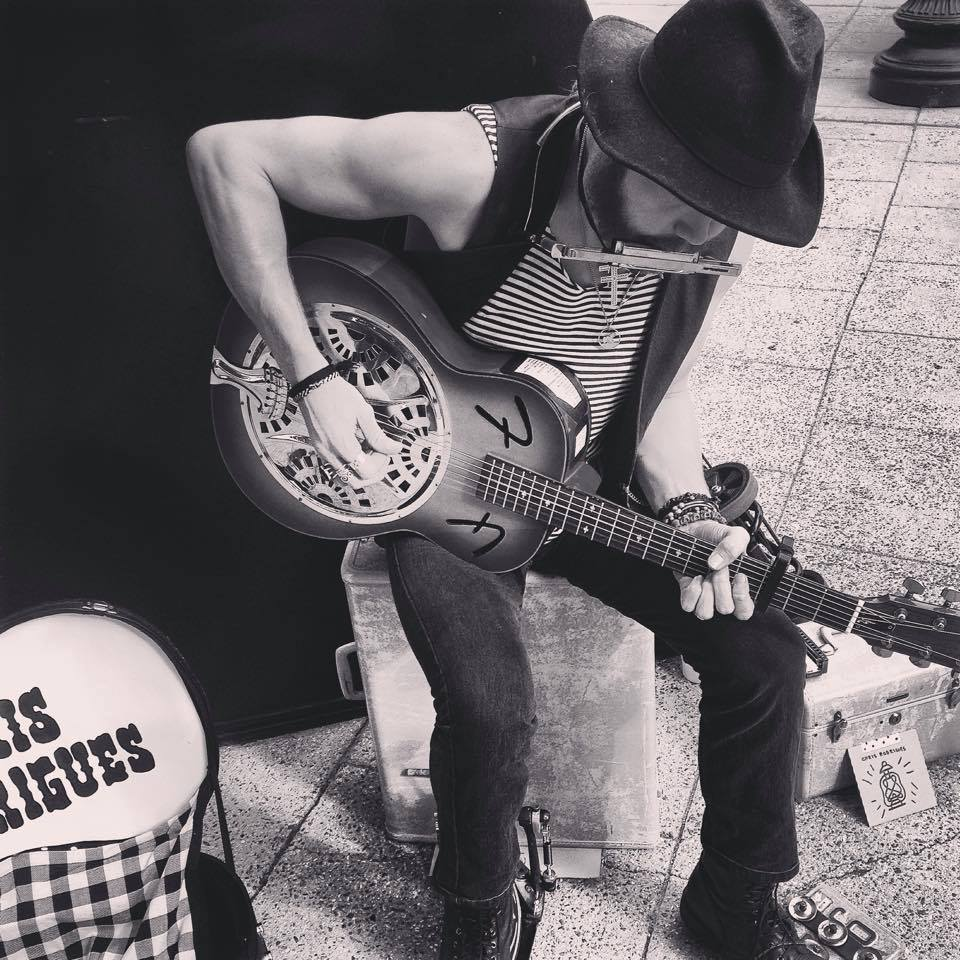
Chris Rodrigues busking in Asheville 2015

Born on June 7, 1989, in Asheville, North Carolina, the son of Teresa Lundsford and Bill Rodrigues. He was raised in the Asheville, North Carolina area and graduated from North Buncombe High School. His father left when he was five years old. He started doing odd jobs, including cleaning, with his mother at a very young age to help her pay the bills. He was given his first guitar as a toddler and learned to play at a very early age. During grade school and high school Chris played with various bluegrass, metal, and rock and roll bands. In an effort to help raise money for bills, Chris Rodrigues eventually took to street performing in Asheville, North Carolina.

Chris Rodrigues started street performing on a more regular basis starting in 2012 and started playing music with Abby the Spoon Lady in the spring of 2013. He released his first solo album I'll Keep My Light Lit on July 8, 2016, and he and Abby the Spoon Lady released their album Working on Wall Street on October 29, 2017.

In 2015, filmmaker Erin Durham released the film Buskin' Blues, a documentary centering around the street performance culture in the Asheville, North Carolina area. The film featured Chris Rodrigues and his performance partner Abby the Spoon Lady. In 2017 filmmaker Justin Johnson directed a short film title Abby the Spoon Lady which chronicles a day in the life of a musician and features Chris Rodrigues.

=== Genre ===
His repertoire consists of a mix of Americana, country blues, jug band, Vaudeville, Appalachian folk and contemporary originals.

=== Influences ===
Musicians that have influenced him include Flatt & Scruggs, Bill Monroe, and the Dixie Hummingbirds, and also LaShun Pace, a gospel singer who originally wrote a song called, "I Know I've Been Changed", which Rodrigues added verses to and released as his own work.

=== Studio albums ===
List of studio albums
Title	Album details
I'll Keep My Light Lit	Released: July 8, 2016; Label: ChrisRodMusic/Spooniversal Studios; Formats: CD, digital download
Working On Wall Street	Released: October 29, 2018; Label: ChrisRodMusic/Spooniversal Studios; Formats: CD, digital download

=== Music videos ===
Title	Year	Album	Source
"Angels in Heaven"	2017	Working on Wall Street	Watch
"Mrs. Jones"	2016	with Abby the Spoon Lady	Watch
"Don't Let The Devil Ride"	2018	with Abby the Spoon Lady	Watch
"Soldier in the Army Of The Lord"	2017	with Abby the Spoon Lady	Watch
"Jesus on the Mainline"	2017	with Abby the Spoon Lady	Watch
"Nobody's Fault But Mine"	2017	with Abby the Spoon Lady	Watch
