= Timeline of Greensboro, North Carolina =

The following is a timeline of the history of the city of Greensboro, North Carolina, USA.

== Prior to 20th century ==
- 1808 – Town of Greensboro established in Guilford County.
- 1824 – First Presbyterian Church of Greensboro founded.
- 1826 – Patriot newspaper begins publication.
- 1827 – Buffalo Presbyterian Church built.
- 1834 – Guilford College chartered.
- 1870 – Population: 497
- 1873 – Bennett College founded.
- 1877 – Chamber of Commerce and Green Hill Cemetery established.
- 1880 – Population: 2,105
- 1889 – Coney Club founded.
- 1890
  - Population: 3,317
  - Daily Record newspaper begins publication.
- 1891
  - State Normal and Industrial School established.
  - Julius I. Foust Building constructed.
- 1895 – Greensboro Industrial and Immigration Association founded.
- 1900 – Population: 10,035.

== 20th century ==
- 1902 – Palmer Memorial Institute founded in nearby Sedalia.
- 1905 – City Board of Health established.
- 1906
  - Greensboro Public Library building constructed.
  - City Fire Commission established.
- 1909
  - Greensboro Daily News begins publication.
  - Greensboro Country Club founded.
- 1910 – Population: 15,895
- 1917 – Guilford Courthouse National Military Park established.
- 1918 – Maplewood Cemetery established.
- 1920 – Population: 19,861.
- 1922 – United Way of Greater Greensboro is founded under the original name "Greensboro Community Chest".
- 1924 – Greensboro Historical Museum established.
- 1926
  - World War Memorial Stadium dedicated.
  - WBIG radio begins broadcasting.
- 1927 – Lindley Field (airfield) established.
- 1928 – Forest Lawn Cemetery established.
- 1930 – Population: 53,569
- 1931 – Paramount Theatre opens.
- 1936 – April: 1936 Cordele–Greensboro tornado outbreak.
- 1940 – Population: 59,319.
- 1949
  - WFMY-TV begins broadcasting.
  - Temple Emanuel active.
- 1950 – Population: 74,389.
- 1955 – The Greensboro Six
- 1957 – June: Simkins v. City of Greensboro decided.
- 1959 – Greensboro Coliseum opens.
- 1960
  - Greensboro sit-ins for civil rights occur.
  - Population: 119,574.
- 1967
  - Greensboro Inner City Ministry established.
  - Carolina Peacemaker begins publication.
- 1968 – Family Life Council and Greensboro Beautiful nonprofit established.
- 1969
  - Jack Elam becomes mayor.
  - May: 1969 Greensboro uprising.
- 1970
  - Circle Drive-In cinema in business.
  - Population: 144,076.
- 1971 – Jim Melvin becomes mayor.
- 1979
  - November 3: Greensboro massacre.
  - Greensboro Hornets baseball team active.
- 1980
  - Guilford County Historic Preservation Commission established.
  - Population: 155,642
- 1981
  - Aggie Stadium opens.
  - John Forbis becomes mayor.
- 1982 – Airport new terminal built.
- 1984 – News & Record newspaper in publication.
- 1987 – June: Ku Klux Klan march and opposing protest.
- 1990 – Population: 183,521.
- 1993 – Carolyn Allen becomes the first female mayor of Greensboro.
- 1997 – City website online (approximate date).
- 1999 – Keith Holliday becomes mayor.
- 2000 – Population: 223,891

== 21st century ==
- 2002– Campus Walk Apartment fire - Janet Danehey sets fire to the Campus Walk apartments.
- 2005 – NewBridge Bank Park (stadium) opens.
- 2007 – Yvonne Johnson becomes the city's first African-American mayor.
- 2008 – Statue of Nathanael Greene by James Barnhill erected in downtown Greensboro
- 2009 – Bill Knight becomes mayor.
- 2010
  - International Civil Rights Center and Museum opens.
  - Population: 269,666.
- 2011 – Robbie Perkins becomes mayor.
- 2013 – Nancy Vaughan becomes mayor.
- 2014 – Jim Westmoreland becomes city manager.
- 2015 – Mark Walker becomes U.S. representative for North Carolina's 6th congressional district.
- 2020 – Population: 299,035
- 2025 - Gate City Guide newsletter begins publication.
- 2026 – Marikay Abuzuaiter becomes mayor.

== See also ==
- Greensboro history
- List of mayors of Greensboro, North Carolina
- Guilford County history
- National Register of Historic Places listings in Guilford County, North Carolina
- Timelines of other cities in North Carolina: Asheville, Charlotte, Durham, Fayetteville, Raleigh, Wilmington, Winston-Salem

== Works cited ==
- Directory of Greensboro, Salem, and Winston. Atlanta, Georgia: Interstate Directory Company. 1884 – via Open Library and University of North Carolina at Greensboro, University Libraries, Digital Collections, Greensboro City Directories, 1884–1963. At Archive.org.
- James W. Albright, ed. (1904). Greensboro, 1808–1904 facts, figures, traditions and reminiscences. Genealogy & local history; LH83. Greensboro, N.C.: J.J. Stone – via HathiTrust.
- Federal Writers’ Project (1939). "Greensboro". North Carolina: A Guide to the Old North State. American Guide Series. Chapel Hill: University of North Carolina Press. p. 203+ – via Open Library.
- Ethel Stephens Arnett. 1955. Greensboro, North Carolina, the county seat of Guilford. Chapel Hill: University of North Carolina Press.
- Hill's Greensboro (Guilford County, N.C.) City Directory. Richmond, Virginia: Hill Directory Co. 1955.
- Samuel M. Kipp III (1977). "Old Notables and Newcomers: The Economic and Political Elite of Greensboro, North Carolina, 1880–1920". The Journal of Southern History. 43 (3): 373–394. doi:10.2307/2207647. JSTOR 2207647.
- George Thomas Kurian (1994), "Greensboro, North Carolina", World Encyclopedia of Cities, vol. 1: North America, Santa Barbara, California: ABC-CLIO, OL 1431653M – via Internet Archive (fulltext)
- Gayle Hicks Fripp (1997). "Brief History of Greensboro". City of Greensboro. Archived from the original on November 21, 2010.
- Otis L. Hairston Jr. (2003). Greensboro, North Carolina. Black America. Charleston, South Carolina: Arcadia.
- Howard E. Covington. 2008. Once upon a city: Greensboro, North Carolina's second century. Greensboro, N.C.: Greensboro Historical Museum, Inc.
- Helen Snow and Tim Cole (2011), "Greensboro", in William S. Powell (ed.), Encyclopedia of North Carolina, University of North Carolina Press
- Raj Chetty; Nathaniel Hendren (2015), City Rankings, Commuting Zones: Causal Effects of the 100 Largest Commuting Zones on Household Income in Adulthood, Equality of Opportunity Project, Harvard University, archived from the original on May 6, 2015, "Rank #98: Greensboro, North Carolina"
