= Timeline of Asheville, North Carolina =

The following is a timeline of the history of the city of Asheville, North Carolina, USA.

== Prior to 20th century ==
- 1792 – Settlement established (approximate date).
- 1793 – Log courthouse built.
- 1797 – Town of Asheville incorporated; named after politician Samuel Ashe.
- 1800 – Population: 38.
- 1824 – Buncombe Turnpike built in vicinity of Asheville.
- 1829 – Vance Circulating Library Society founded.
- 1849 – Asheville News begins publication.
- 1850 – Population: 502.
- 1870
  - North Carolina Citizen newspaper begins publication.
  - Population: 1,400.
- 1879 – Public Library opens.
- 1880 – Western North Carolina Railroad begins operating.
- 1882 – The first organized fire department is created, which will eventually become the Asheville Fire Department.
- 1883 – City of Asheville incorporated.
- 1889
  - Streetcar begins operating.
  - Construction of Biltmore Estate begins near Asheville.
- 1890 – Population: 10,235.
- 1893 – Young Men's Institute Building constructed.
- 1894 – Swannanoa Country Club founded.
- 1895 – Construction of Biltmore Estate is completed.
- 1897 – Zebulon Baird Vance monument erected in Pack Square.
- 1898
  - Manor Hotel in business.
  - Biltmore Forest School established near Asheville.
- 1899 – Appalachian National Park Association formed during a meeting in Asheville.
- 1900 – Future writer Thomas Wolfe born in Asheville.

== 20th century ==
- 1902 – Theodore Roosevelt visited Asheville.
- 1906 – Will Harris's murderous rampage
- 1909
  - St. Lawrence Church built.
  - Palace Theatre in business.
- 1913 – Grove Park Inn in business.
- 1915 – Asheville Masonic Temple built.
- 1916 - The Great Asheville Flood
- 1917 –
  - West Asheville becomes part of the city of Asheville.
  - Nov. 16, a fire at Catholic Hill School for Colored Children killed seven and destroyed the building. Considered to be one of the worst disasters in Asheville history.
- 1920 – Population: 28,504.
- 1922 – Imperial Theatre in business.
- 1924 – Hi-rise Jackson Building constructed.
- 1925 – Memorial Stadium opens.
- 1927
  - WWNC radio begins broadcasting.
  - First Baptist Church built.
- 1928
  - Asheville City Hall and Buncombe County Courthouse built.
  - Dutch-owned Enka rayon manufactory begins operating near city.
- 1929 – Kenilworth becomes part of Asheville.
- 1930
  - Southern Mountain Handicraft Guild founded.
  - Population: 50,193.
- 1934
  - Bus begins operating.
  - Great Smoky Mountains National Park established in vicinity of Asheville.
- 1935 – Blue Ridge Parkway construction begins.
- 1941 – Black Mountain College of art relocates to vicinity of Asheville.
- 1948 – March 10: Highland Hospital fire; Zelda Fitzgerald among the fatalities.
- 1949- The Thomas Wolfe Memorial is established inside the Old Kentucky Home in downtown Asheville.
- 1952 – Western North Carolina Historical Association organized.
- 1953 – WISE-TV (television) begins broadcasting.
- 1954 – WLOS-TV (television) begins broadcasting.
- 1959 – Asheville Industrial Education Center established.
- 1961 – Asheville Regional Airport begins operating.
- 1964 – Asheville Chamber of Commerce donated the North Carolina Governor's Western Residence to the state government
- 1971 – Asheville Mall in business.
- 1976 – Preservation Society of Asheville and Buncombe County organized.
- 1978 – North Carolina Division of Archives and Records "Western Office" headquartered in Asheville.
- 1979 – Old Buncombe County Genealogical Society formed.
- 1980 – Population: 54,022.
- 1983 – James M. Clarke becomes U.S. representative for North Carolina's 11th congressional district.
- 1990 – Sister city agreement established with Vladikavkaz, Russia.
- 1991 – Asheville Citizen-Times newspaper in publication.
- 1994 – Sister city agreement established with San Cristóbal de las Casas, Mexico.
- 1996 – Sister city agreement established with Saumur, France.
- 1998 – City website online (approximate date).

== 21st century ==
- 2000 – Population: 68,889.
- 2003 – Asheville Film Festival begins.
- 2004 – Sister city agreement established with Karpenisi, Greece.
- 2005
  - Terry Bellamy becomes first African-American in city elected mayor.
  - Patrick McHenry becomes U.S. representative for North Carolina's 10th congressional district.
- 2006 – Sister city agreement established with Valladolid, Mexico.
- 2007 – Asheville-Buncombe Libraries changed name to Buncombe County Public Libraries.
- 2008 – Sister city agreement established with Osogbo, Nigeria.
- 2010 – Population: 83,393.
- 2013 – Esther Manheimer becomes mayor.
- 2019 – Population: 92,870.
- 2024 – Asheville, along with the entirety of the western end of North Carolina, sustains catastrophic damage as a direct result of Hurricane Helene.

== See also ==
- List of mayors of Asheville, North Carolina
- Buncombe County history
- National Register of Historic Places listings in Buncombe County, North Carolina
- Timelines of other cities in North Carolina: Charlotte, Durham, Fayetteville, Greensboro, Raleigh, Wilmington, Winston-Salem

== Bibliography ==
- "Buncombe County". Branson's North Carolina Business Directory (6th ed.). Raleigh: Levi Branson. 1884.
- Asheville City Directory. Southern Directory Co. 1887.
- Lindsey's Guide Book to Western North Carolina. Asheville: T.H. Lindsey. 1890.
- Asheville and Vicinity, a Handbook of Information, Containing an Exhaustive History of Asheville. Atlanta: J.D. Eggleston and J.S. McIlwaine. 1897.
- Foster A. Sondley (February 1898), "Asheville's Centenary", Asheville Citizen
- F.H. Richardson (1905). "Asheville, N.C.". Richardson's Southern Guide. Chicago: Monarch Book Company – via Internet Archive.
- "Asheville", United States (4th ed.), Leipzig: K. Baedeker, 1909, OCLC 02338437
- "Asheville" . Encyclopædia Britannica. Vol. 2 (11th ed.). 1910. pp. 731–732.
- John Preston Arthur (1914). "County History: Buncombe County". Western North Carolina: a History (from 1730 to 1913). Raleigh: Edwards & Broughton. pp. 143–159. (Includes information about Asheville)
- "Everybody Helps: Asheville's Unique Method of Raising Money". Town Development: A Magazine for the Man Who Believes in Himself and in His Town. 13. New York. December 1914. OCLC 52158201.
- Asheville, North Carolina City Directory, Commercial Service Co., 1921
- F.A. Sondley; Theodore Davidson (1922). Asheville and Buncombe County. Asheville: The Citizen Co.
- "Asheville Builds a New City". American City Magazine. 35. New York: Civic Press. September 1926. OCLC 29653835.
- Federal Writers’ Project (1939). "Asheville". North Carolina: a Guide to the Old North State. American Guide Series. Chapel Hill: University of North Carolina Press. p. 137+.
- City of Asheville (2003), Asheville 2025 Plan
- Paul T. Hellmann (2006). "North Carolina: Asheville". Historical Gazetteer of the United States. Taylor & Francis. ISBN 1-135-94859-3.
- Chase, Nan K. 2007. Asheville, a history. Jefferson, NC: McFarland & Co.
- Lisa Gregory (2010), "Asheville", in William S. Powell (ed.), Encyclopedia of North Carolina, University of North Carolina Press
- William S. Powell; Michael Hill (2010). "Asheville". North Carolina Gazetteer (2nd ed.). University of North Carolina Press. ISBN 978-0-8078-9829-1.
- "Asheville, NC". U.S. City Open Data Census. Sunlight Foundation and Open Knowledge International. 2018. Archived from the original on November 18, 2018.
