= Timeline of Wilmington, North Carolina =

The following is a timeline of the history of the city of Wilmington, North Carolina, United States.

== 18th-19th centuries ==
- 1733 - James Wimble and three other men begin to sell plots for a settlement under names such as "New Carthage", "New Liverpool", "Newton" or "New Town".
- 1739
  - Town incorporated and renamed "Wilmington" after the Earl of Wilmington, the patron of the governor of North Carolina Gabriel Johnston.
  - New Hanover County seat moves to Newton from Brunswick.
- 1751 - St. James Episcopal Church founded.
- 1756 - Fire.
- 1760 - John Sampson becomes mayor.
- 1764 - Fort Johnston built near Wilmington.
- 1776 - February 27: Battle of Moore's Creek Bridge fought near Wilmington during the American Revolutionary War.
- 1781 - Wilmington occupied by British forces under command of Cornwallis.
- 1820 - Population: 2,633.
- 1830 - Population: 3,791.
- 1840 - Population: 5,335.
- 1844 - Wilmington Journal newspaper begins publication.
- 1849 - April 16: Snowfall.
- 1850 - Population: 7,264.
- 1855 - Oakdale Cemetery and Wilmington Library Association (social library) organized.
- 1860 - Population: 9,552.
- 1862 - Yellow fever epidemic empties out city, befalling over 1600 and killing 654.
- 1864 - December: Wilmington Campaigns by Union forces begin in area during the American Civil War.
- 1865 - February 11–22: Battle of Wilmington fought; Union forces win.
- 1866 - City of Wilmington incorporated.
- 1867
  - Morning Star newspaper begins publication.
  - Wilmington National Cemetery established.
- 1879 - Africo-American Presbyterian newspaper begins publication.
- 1892 - New Hanover County Courthouse built.
- 1898 - November: Wilmington massacre.

== 20th century ==
- 1906 - Public library built.
- 1915 - Royal Theatre in business.
- 1919 - Customs House built.
- 1935 - WMFD radio begins broadcasting.
- 1947 - University of North Carolina at Wilmington established.
- 1954 - WECT (television) begins broadcasting.
- 1955 - Starway Drive-In cinema in business.
- 1956 - Lower Cape Fear Historical Society formed.
- 1966 - Historic Wilmington preservation group founded.
- 1971 - February 6: Bombing of grocery store; racial unrest ensues, eventually leading to controversial conviction of "Wilmington Ten."
- 1976 - Emsley A. Laney High School established.
- 1980 - United States Court of Appeals for the Fourth Circuit overturns "Wilmington Ten" convictions.
- 1981 - Athlete Michael Jordan graduates from Laney High School.
- 1984 - Italian film producer Dino De Laurentiis opens the De Laurentiis Entertainment Group studio complex, now owned by Cinespace Studios.
- 1989 - Old New Hanover Genealogical Society formed.
- 1997 - Mike McIntyre becomes U.S. representative for North Carolina's 7th congressional district.
- 1998 - City website online (approximate date).

== 21st century ==
- 2003 - Star-News in publication.
- 2007 - Bill Saffo becomes mayor.
- 2010 - Population: 106,476.
- 2015 - David Rouzer becomes U.S. representative for North Carolina's 7th congressional district.
- 2018 - Hurricane Florence makes landfall in Wilmington causing major flooding and several deaths

== See also ==
- Wilmington history
- List of mayors of Wilmington, North Carolina
- New Hanover County history
- National Register of Historic Places listings in New Hanover County, North Carolina
- Timelines of other cities in North Carolina: Asheville, Charlotte, Durham, Fayetteville, Greensboro, Raleigh, Winston-Salem

== Bibliography ==
- T. Tuther, Jr., ed. (1860), Wilmington Directory, Geo. H. Kelley
- T.H. Haddock, ed. (1871), Wilmington, N.C., Directory, P. Heinsberger. (Includes city history, pp. 9–24)
- George E. Waring, Jr.; U.S. Department of the Interior, Census Office (1887), "North Carolina: Wilmington", Report on the Social Statistics of Cities: Southern and the Western States, Washington DC: Government Printing Office, pp. 93–94
- "Wilmington (2.)" . Encyclopædia Britannica. Vol. 24 (9th ed.). 1888.
- "New Hanover County". Branson's North Carolina Business Directory. Raleigh, NC: Levi Branson. 1896.
- Lyman Pierson Powell, ed. (1904), "Wilmington", Historic Towns of the Southern States, New York: G. P. Putnam's Sons
- Wilmington, N.C. Directory, Richmond, Virginia: Hill Directory Co., 1905
  - 1911 ed., 1920 ed.
  - 1952 ed., 1963 ed.
- F.H. Richardson (1905). "Wilmington, N.C.". Richardson's Southern Guide. Chicago: Monarch Book Company – via Internet Archive.
- "Wilmington (North Carolina)" . Encyclopædia Britannica. Vol. 28 (11th ed.). 1910. pp. 690–691.
- Federal Writers’ Project (1939). "Wilmington". North Carolina: a Guide to the Old North State. American Guide Series. Chapel Hill: University of North Carolina Press. p. 247+.
- Bulletin, Wilmington, NC: Lower Cape Fear Historical Society, archived from the original on August 11, 2015 1957-
- Diane Cobb Cashman (1982). Cape Fear Adventure: An Illustrated History of Wilmington. California: Windsor. ISBN 0897814142 – via Open Library.
- Alan D. Watson (1992). Wilmington, Port of North Carolina. University of South Carolina Press. ISBN 087249778X.
- John L. Godwin (2000). Black Wilmington and the North Carolina Way: Portrait of a Community in the Era of Civil Rights Protest. Lanham, Maryland: University Press of America. ISBN 978-0-7618-1682-9.
- Alan D. Watson (2003). Wilmington, North Carolina, to 1861. McFarland & Company. ISBN 978-0-7864-8214-6.
- Paul T. Hellmann (2006). "North Carolina: Wilmington". Historical Gazetteer of the United States. Taylor & Francis. ISBN 1-135-94859-3.
- Beverly Tetterton (2006), "Wilmington", in William S. Powell (ed.), Encyclopedia of North Carolina, University of North Carolina Press
