= 2025 Greensboro mayoral election =

- November 4, 2025
Candidate	Marikay; Abuzuaiter	Robbie Perkins
Party	Nonpartisan	Nonpartisan
Popular vote	27,359	17,470
Percentage	60.69%	38.76%
Mayor before election
Nancy Vaughan
Democratic
Elected mayor
Marikay Abuzuaiter
Democratic

The 2025 Greensboro mayoral election was held on November 4, 2025, to elect the mayor for Greensboro, North Carolina. The primary election was held on October 7, 2025, with the filing period for candidates being between July 5 and 18. Incumbent mayor Nancy Vaughan chose not to seek re-election to a fifth term.

== Primary ==
=== Candidates ===
==== Advanced to general ====
- Robbie Perkins, former mayor
- Marikay Abuzuaiter, Mayor pro tem and city councillor

==== Eliminated in primary ====
- Mark Cummings, lawyer and former District Court Judge in Greensboro and candidate for mayor in 2022
- Akir Khan

=== Results ===
2025 Greensboro mayoral primary election results
Candidate	Votes	%
Marikay Abuzuaiter	8,575	39.89%
Robbie Perkins	6,984	32.49%
Mark Cummings	3,838	17.85%
Akir Khan	2,100	9.77%
Total votes	21,497	100.00%

== General election ==
City Council-member and Mayor Pro tem Marikay Abuzuaiter and former mayor Robbie Perkins advanced to the November 4 general election after placing first and second in the nonpartisan blanket primary, with 39.89% and 32.49% of the vote respectively.

=== Results ===
2025 Greensboro mayoral general election results
Candidate	Votes	%
Marikay Abuzuaiter	27,359	60.69%
Robbie Perkins	17,470	38.76%
Write-in	249	0.55%
Total votes	45,078	100.00%
