= List of mayors of Wilmington, North Carolina =

Mayors of the city of Wilmington, North Carolina, USA

The following is a list of mayors of the city of Wilmington, North Carolina, USA.

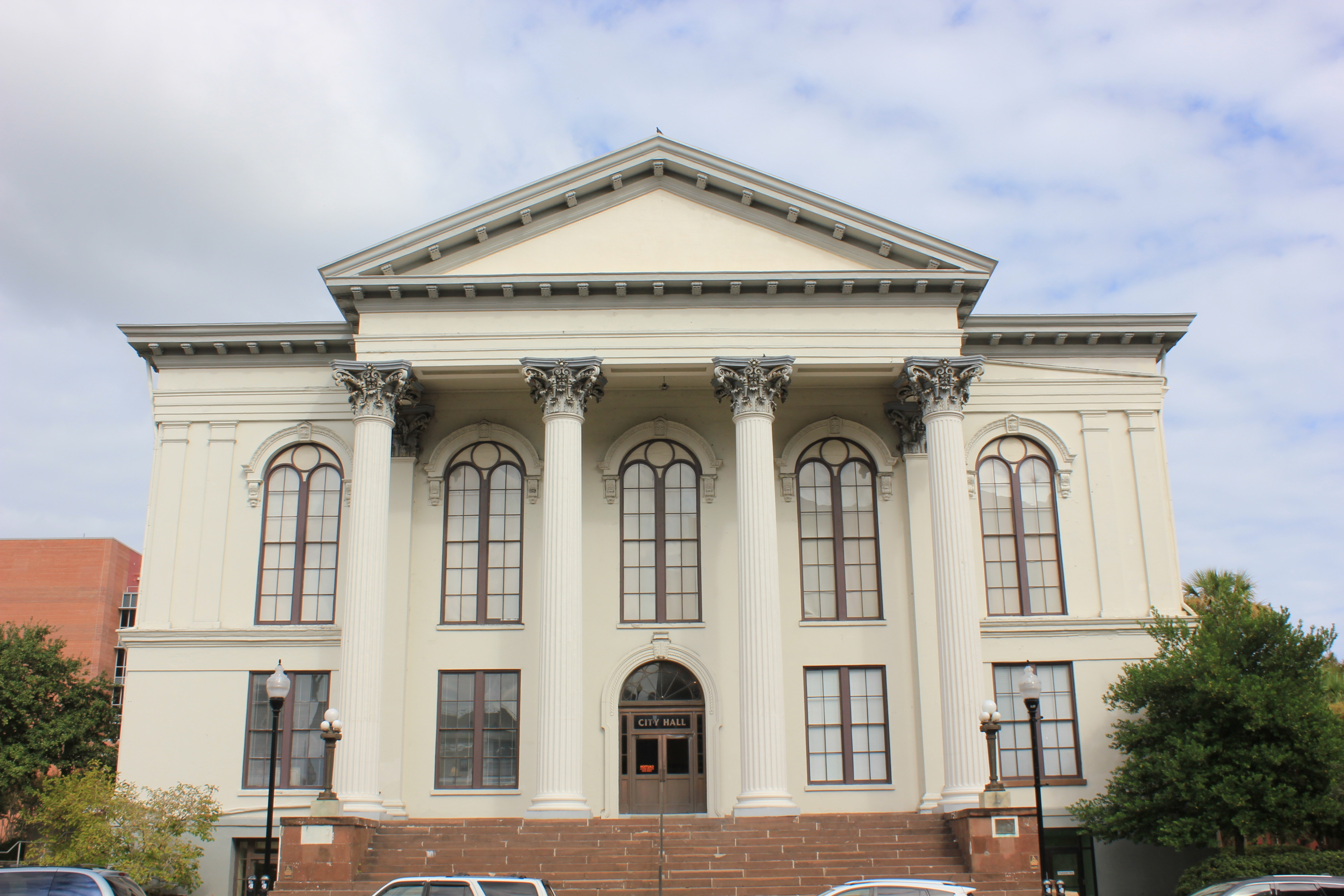
Wilmington City Hall building in North Carolina, United States, in 2017 also is a small town

== Mayors ==
- John Sampson, 1760
- Frederick Gregg, c. 1760s
- Moses John deRosset, c. 1766
- ?
- Hinton James c. 1800s, first student to attend the University of North Carolina
- ?
- William James Harriss, ?–1839, physician, died in office
- Colonel John McRae c. 1855
- A.H. Van Bokkelen, 1866
- John Dawson?–1868
- Joseph H. Neff, 1868–?
- Silas N. Martin, 1871–1872
- S.H. (Solomon Harry) Fishblate 1878–1880, 1893
- Edward Dudley Hall 1883–1887
- A. G. Ricaud, 1891–1893
- Silas P. Wright 1897–1898, resigned at gunpoint and Waddell installed in his place.
- Alfred Moore Waddell, 1898–1906
- William B. Cooper, 1902–1903, as (mayor pro tempore)
- William E. Springer 1907–1910
- Joseph D. Smith, c. 1911
- P.Q. (Parker Quince) Moore, c.1913–1921
- James Cowen, c 1922
- William E. Mayo 1921–1924, died in office
- Katherine Mayo Cowan 1924–1925, assumed her husband's term
- Walter H. Blair, 1926–1937
- Robert E. Cooper 1937–1940
- Hargrove Bellamy 1941–1942
- Edgar Yow, 1942–1943
- Bruce B. Cameron 1943–1944, died in office
- W. Ronald Lane, 1945–1946
- J.E.L. "Hi, Buddy" Wade, 1948 (mayor pro tempore), 1949–1950, 1958–1960
- Royce McClelland 1951
- E.S. Capps 1952–1953, 1960–1961
- E. L. White, c. 1953–1955
- Daniel David Cameron, 1956–1958
- Ogden Allsbrook, 1961–1970
- Hannah Block, c. 1963 (mayor pro tempore)
- Luther M. Cromartie, 1970–1971
- Benjamin David Schwartz, c. 1971–1972
- John Symes, 1972
- Herbert B. Brand, 1973–1975
- Ben Halterman, 1975–1983
- William Schwartz, c. 1983–1985
- Berry Armon Williams, 1985–1987
- Don Betz, 1987–1997
- Hamilton Hicks, 1997–1999
- David L. Jones, 1999–2001
- Harper Peterson 2001–2003
- Spence Broadhurst, 2003–2006
- Bill Saffo, 2007–present

== See also ==
- Wilmington history
- Timeline of Wilmington, North Carolina
