= List of mayors of Asheville, North Carolina =

This is a list of mayors from Asheville, North Carolina. This position was originally called the chairman of the Board of Commissioners but changed to mayor in 1857. Asheville historian Foster Sondley wrote that no reports of elected officials were kept until 1845.

Mayors were traditionally elected in May; however, the term year is typically the year elected rather than the range from June to May. In the early years, mayors were elected for one-year terms. Later, terms were expanded to two years and, then, to four years. In 1915, the Board of Aldermen was changed to the Board of Commissioners.

Year in office	Mayor	Vice or assistant mayor	References
1842	James McConnell Smith		
18xx ?	James Washington Patton (1803–1861)		
1845	Isaac B. Sawyer		
July 24, 1849 – March 28, 1855	James McConnell Smith		(Note: Smith's title was chairman of the Board of Commissioners.)
1857–1858	Isaac B. Sawyer		(Note: In 1857, Sawyer became the first to have the title mayor.)
1860	Edward James Aston		
1861	Isaac B. Sawyer		
1862–1866	Edward James Aston		
1866	Montroville Patton		(Note: Patton resigned before the end of his term.)
1866	J. M. Israel		
1867–1868	Oscar Eastman		(Note: Eastman resigned before the end of his term.)
1868	S. G. Kerr		
1869	Thomas D. Johnston		
1870	M. E. Carter		
1871	John Jones		
1872–1874	J. E. Rankin		(Note: Rankin was elected in 1872 and re-elected in 1873 and 1874.)
1875	W. L. Hilliard		
1876	J. E. Rankin		
1877–1881	A. T. Summey		(Note: Summey was elected in 1877, 1879, 1889, and 1881.)
1882–1883	Virgil S. Lusk		
1884–1886	Edward James Aston		
1887–1888	Herschel S. Harkins		
1889–1893	Charles D. Blanton		
1893–1894	Thomas Walton Patton	Ed Hay	
1895	Theodore Fulton Davidson		
1896	William J. Cocke		
1897	J. E. Rankin		
1898	F. M. Miller		
1899–1900	W. A. Blair		
1901–1902	F. M. Miller		
1903–1904	C. T. Rawls		
1905–1906	Alfred Smith Barnard		
1907–1910	John A. Campbell		
1911–1919	J. E. Rankin		
1919–1923	Edward Gallatin Roberts		
1923–1927	John H. Cathey		
1927– December 11, 1930	Edward Gallatin Roberts		(Note: Roberts resigned before the end of his term.)
December 1930	Harry W. Plummer		
1931–1933	Otis Green		
1933–1934	Wickes Wambolt	A. C. Avery	
1935–December 1938	Robert M. Wells	Holmes Bryson	(Note: Wells resigned before the end of his term to become the solicitor of the 19th District.)
December 1938 – 1941	Holmes Bryson	L. Lyons Lee	
1941–1947	L. Lyons Lee	James E. Divelbiss	
1947–1951	Clarence E. Morgan	Fred L. Seeley Jr. (1947–1948)	
1951–1969	Earl W. Eller		
1969–1971	Wayne S. Montgomery		
1971–1975	Richard A. Wood Jr.	Calvin W. Marshall	
1975–1977	Eugene C. Ochsenreiter	Bill B. Horton	
1977–1983	Roy Trantham	Bill B. Horton (1977–1978)	
1977–1983	Roy Trantham	Ralph D. Morris (1979–1981)	
1977–1983	Roy Trantham	Norma Price (1981–1982)	
1983–1984	Larry McDevitt	Wilhelmina Bratton	
1985–1988	W. Louis Bissette	Mary Lloyd Frank (1985–1986)	
1985–1988	W. Louis Bissette	Kenneth Michalove (1987–1988)	
1989–1992	Kenneth M. Michalove	William G. Moore (1989–1990)	
1989–1992	Kenneth M. Michalove	Eugene W. Ellison (1991–1992)	
1993–1996	Russell Martin	Chris Peterson (1993–1994)	
1993–1996	Russell Martin	Barbara Field (1995–1996)	
1997–2001	Leni Sitnick	Edward C. Hay Jr.	
1997–2001	Leni Sitnick	M. Charles Cloninger (1999–2000)	
2001–2005	Charles Worley	Terry Bellamy (2001–2002)	
2001–2005	Charles Worley	R. Carl Mumpower (2003–2004)	
2005–2013	Terry Bellamy	Holly Jones (2005–2006)	
2005–2013	Terry Bellamy	Jan Davis (2007–December 2010)	
2005–2013	Terry Bellamy	Brownie Newman (December 2010 – 2011)	
2005–2013	Terry Bellamy	Esther Manheimer (2012–2013)	
2013–present (2025)	Esther Manheimer	Marc Hunt (2013–2015)	
2013–present (2025)	Esther Manheimer	Gwen Wisler (2015–2019)	
2013–present (2025)	Esther Manheimer	Sheneika Smith (2021)	
2013–present (2025)	Esther Manheimer	Sandra Kilgore (2022–2023)	

== See also ==
- Timeline of Asheville, North Carolina
