= 2017 Greensboro mayoral election =

Greensboro mayoral election, 2017
- November 7, 2017
| Candidate | Nancy Vaughan | Diane Moffett |
| Party | Nonpartisan | Nonpartisan |
| Popular vote | 19,915 | 9,424 |
| Percentage | 67.06% | 31.73% |
Mayor before election
Nancy Vaughan
Democratic
Elected mayor
Nancy Vaughan
Democratic

The 2017 Greensboro mayoral election was held on November 7, 2017, to elect the mayor of Greensboro, North Carolina. It saw the reelection of Nancy Vaughan.

== Results ==
=== Primary ===
The date of the primary was October 10.

Primary results
| Candidate | Votes | % |
|---|---|---|
| Nancy Vaughan (incumbent) | 10,593 | 61.25 |
| Diane Moffett | 3,747 | 21.66 |
| John T. Brown | 2,909 | 16.82 |
| Total votes | 17,294 | |

=== General election ===
The general election took place on November 7.

General election results
| Candidate | Votes | % |
|---|---|---|
| Nancy Vaughan (incumbent) | 19,915 | 67.06 |
| Diane Moffett | 9,424 | 31.73 |
| Write ins | 358 | 1.21 |
| Total votes | 29,697 | |
