= 2013 Greensboro mayoral election =

Greensboro mayoral election, 2013
- November 5, 2013
| Candidate | Nancy Vaughan | Robbie Perkins |
| Party | Nonpartisan | Nonpartisan |
| Popular vote | 19,841 | 13,521 |
| Percentage | 53.14% | 36.21% |
Mayor before election
Robbie Perkins
Elected mayor
Nancy Vaughan
Democratic

The 2013 Greensboro mayoral election was held on November 5, 2013, to elect the mayor of Greensboro, North Carolina. It saw the election of Nancy Vaughan, who unseated incumbent mayor Robbie Perkins.

== Results ==
=== Primary ===
The date of the primary was October 8.

Primary results
| Candidate | Votes | % |
|---|---|---|
| Nancy Vaughan | 7,632 | 48.30 |
| Robbie Perkins (incumbent) | 6,037 | 38.20 |
| George Hartzman | 1,909 | 12.08 |
| Write ins | 224 | 1.42 |
| Total votes | 15,802 | |

=== General election ===
General election results
| Candidate | Votes | % |
|---|---|---|
| Nancy Vaughan | 19,841 | 53.14 |
| Robbie Perkins (incumbent) | 13,521 | 36.21 |
| Write ins | 175 | 0.46 |
| Total votes | 37,337 | |
