= 2015 Greensboro mayoral election =

Greensboro mayoral election, 2015
- November 3, 2015
Candidate	Nancy Vaughan	Devin R. King
Party	Nonpartisan	Nonpartisan
Popular vote	18,031	2,238
Percentage	87.72%	10.89%
Mayor before election
Nancy Vaughan
Democratic
Elected mayor
Nancy Vaughan
Democratic

The 2015 Greensboro mayoral election was held on November 3, 2015, to elect the mayor of Greensboro, North Carolina. It saw the reelection of Nancy Vaughan.

== Results ==
=== Primary ===
The date of the primary was October 8.

Primary results
Candidate	Votes	%
Nancy Vaughan (incumbent)	6,212	87.59
Devin R. King	518	5.10
Sal Leone	362	7.30
Total votes	7,092	

=== General election ===
General election results
Candidate	Votes	%
Nancy Vaughan (incumbent)	18,031	87.72
Devin R. King	2,238	10.89
Write ins	286	1.39
Total votes	20,555	
