= Virgil Lusk =

American politician

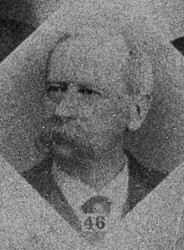
- Lusk c. 1889

Member of the North Carolina House of Representatives
- In office 1895, 1897

Mayor of Asheville, North Carolina
- In office 1882–1883
- Preceded by: A. T. Summey
- Succeeded by: Edward James Aston

Personal details
- Born: Virgil Stuart Lusk
- Party: Republican
- Occupation: Politician, attorney

Military service
- Allegiance: Confederate States of America
- Branch/service: Confederate States Army
- Battles/wars: American Civil War

Virgil Stuart Lusk was a district attorney and political leader in North Carolina. He served as mayor of Asheville, North Carolina. He fought in the Confederate States Army as a cavalry officer and was a prisoner of war during the American Civil War. He became a Republican in 1865.

== Early life ==
Virgil Lusk was born on May 9, 1836 at Spring Creek in Buncombe County. The locale would later become a part of Madison County. The youngest of nine children, he was educated in local schools and in 1860 was licensed to practice law before the Court of Pleas and Quarter Session. The following year, he was licensed to practice in the North Carolina Superior Court.

== Career ==
Following the Civil War, Lusk was appointed solicitor for North Carolina's 12th Judicial District. In that capacity, he prosecuted Ku Klux Klanmen accused of violence in region, garnering their organization's anger. The Asheville Citizen, edited by the Conservative Randolph A. Shotwell, attacked Lusk's performance as district solicitor and printed an unsigned editorial by Asheville Mayor Melvin E. Carter which accused Lusk of abusing his office to promote Republican interests, leading Lusk to publishing a countering piece in the Asheville Pioneer.

The morning Lusk's contribution to the Asheville Pioneer was published, local Klan leaders convened in the offices of The Asheville Citizen to formulate plan to punish him. As a result, Shotwell was chosen to carry out an attack on the solicitor. He saw Lusk speaking with local attorney James H. Merrimon in the city public square, approached him discreetly from behind, and then struck him in the head with a cane. Lusk fell to the ground and Shotwell grabbed him by the collar, hoisted him up, and proceeded to continue striking him around the head and shoulders. Lusk drew a .32 caliber pistol from his pocket and fired two shots, striking Shotwell in his legs. Shotwell raised his hands and declared that he had no weapon and was helped away from the square by friends. A crowd and a local marshal were drawn in by the commotion. The marshal arrested Lusk and escorted him to the mayor's office. Mayor Carter found Lusk guilty of an unlawful discharge of a firearm within city limits and fined him five dollars. The Superior Court sitting in Buncombe County later received a guilty plea from Shotwell for his attack on Lusk.

Lusk continued to serve as a district solicitor until 1871.

As mayor he was involved in water projects.

Lusk served in the North Carolina Senate in 1889 and in the North Carolina House of Representatives in 1895 and 1897. He and fellow Republican Charles Alston Cook were caricatured in the, North Carolinian, a Democratic Party paper in Raleigh, North Carolina.

== Later life ==
Lusk died at his home in Asheville on September 5, 1929 at 94 years of age.

== Works cited ==
- Cheney, John L. Jr., ed. (1981). North Carolina Government, 1585-1979: A Narrative and Statistical History (revised ed.). Raleigh: North Carolina Secretary of State. OCLC 1290270510.
- McKinney, Gordon (1981). "The Klan in the Southern Mountains: The Lusk-Shotwell Controversy". Appalachian Journal. 8 (2): 89–104. JSTOR 40932374.
- Nash, Steven E. (2016). Reconstruction's Ragged Edge: The Politics of Postwar Life in the Southern Mountains. Chapel Hill: The University of North Carolina Press. ISBN 9781469626246.
