= Statue of Minerva (Greensboro, North Carolina) =

Statue in Greensboro, North Carolina

- The statue in 2024
- Artist: James Barnhill
- Completion date: 2003
- Medium: Bronze sculpture
- Subject: Minerva
- Location: Greensboro, North Carolina
- Owner: University of North Carolina at Greensboro

The Statue of Minerva is a bronze sculpture of the Roman goddess Minerva on the campus of the University of North Carolina at Greensboro in Greensboro, North Carolina. The goddess has been the academic symbol of the university since its founding as a women's college. The sculpture was created by alumnus James Barnhill and installed on the campus in 2003. Students leave offerings, mainly apples, at the statue during exams.

== History ==
Minerva, the Roman goddess of wisdom, was recognized as the academic symbol of the State Normal and Industrial School (later UNC Greensboro) as early as 1893 or 1894.

=== Original plaster statue ===
The class of 1907 gifted a 7.5-foot plaster statue of Minerva to the North Carolina State Normal and Industrial College that was installed in the entrance of the Students' Building. The cast was taken from Minerva Giustiniani, located in the Braccio Nuovo of the Musei Capitolini in Rome. The statue stood on a wooden base that was gifted by the class of 1908. It remained in the Students' Building until 1950. Following the demolition of the Students' Building in 1950, the statue was housed in various places on the campus, including Aycock Auditorium and the Elliott University Center, where it was kept in the Cone Ballroom.

In 1965, the Greensboro Garden Club borrowed the statue for their flower show.

In the 1980s, it was stored in the attic of the Alumni House. After sustaining damage various places, the statue was taken to the Virginia Dare room for the 13th Annual Senior Day, but it had disappeared from campus by the 2000s.

=== Bronze statue ===
The class of 1953 commissioned a second statue, sculpted by UNC Greensboro alumnus James Barnhill, graduate of the class of 1982, for the courtyard behind the Elliott University Center, along College Avenue. The sculpture was cast verdigris. This statue, unlike the original plaster version, has the goddess stretching her arms outward.

The 9-foot statue was installed in 2003.

One of the university's traditions includes students leaving offerings to the goddess at the statue. Traditionally, students leave apples at the statue in exchange for good luck on exams and to help them receive good grades at the end of the semester. Over the years, students have also left offerings of daisies (the university's official flower), coins, peaches, and letters.
