= Terry Bellamy =

American politician

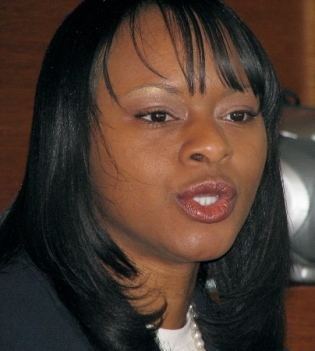

Mayor of Asheville, North Carolina
- In office December 6, 2005 – December 10, 2013
- Vice Mayors: Diana Hollis Jones; Jan Davis; Brownie Newman; Esther Manheimer
- Preceded by: Charles Worley
- Succeeded by: Esther Manheimer

Personal details
- Party: Democratic
- Education: University of North Carolina at Charlotte

Terry M. Bellamy is the former mayor of Asheville, North Carolina. She was first elected to the Asheville City Council in 1999 and won re‑election in 2003. She was elected mayor in November 2005, defeating incumbent Mayor Charles Worley in the October primary. Bellamy became the youngest mayor in North Carolina at the age of 33 and the first African-American Mayor of Asheville. Bellamy, a Democrat, received 10,534 votes (56.8%) to opponent Joe Dunn's 8,004 votes (43.2%). She won re-election in 2009. Bellamy chose not to run for another term in 2013, but instead announced plans to run for the U.S. House of Representatives for a second time.

Bellamy is a native of Asheville and graduated from the University of North Carolina at Charlotte with a degree in English. She is married to Lamont Bellamy and they have two children. Her experience includes over ten years as Marketing Manager for Mountain Housing Opportunities and she is Financial Manager for Diamond Executive Car Transportation Service.

== Highlights as mayor ==
On February 9, 2010, Bellamy voted against providing same-sex partner benefits to city employees.

Bellamy worked with citizens to receive the United States Department of Justice’s Weed and Seed site designation for the West Riverside Neighborhood. She was active at the forefront of the planning of the City of Asheville Youth Leadership Academy. Bellamy was principal in implementing a $40 million in bonds to refurbish the waterline system for the long-term enhancement of community waterlines.

=== Appointments ===
- Selected along with 80 other mayors, to meet with President Barack Obama within the first 60 days of his administration
- Appointed by former Governor Mike Easley to the 21st Century Transportation Committee
- Executive Committee Member of Land of the Sky Regional Council
- Executive Committee Member of North Carolina Metro Mayors Coalition
- Board Member of North Carolina League of Municipalities
- Board Member of Metropolitan Sewerage District of Buncombe County
- Council Liaison for both the Fair Housing Commission and the Parks and Recreation Advisory Board
- Board Member of HUB Community Economic Development and Alliance
- Advisory Board Member of the University of North Carolina at Charlotte College of Arts and Science
- Honorary Chair for the March of Dimes
