= 2022 Greensboro mayoral election =

Mayoral election in Greensboro, North Carolina

- July 26, 2022
- Registered: 203,311
- Turnout: 32,960
Candidate	Nancy Vaughan	Justin Outling
Party	Nonpartisan	Nonpartisan
Popular vote	13,976	13,541
Percentage	42.4%	41.0%
- Precinct results Vaughan: 30–40% 40–50% 50–60% Outling: 30–40% 40–50% 50–60% 60–70% Tie: 50%
Mayor before election
Nancy Vaughan
Democratic
Elected mayor
Nancy Vaughan
Democratic

The 2022 Greensboro mayoral election was held on July 26, 2022, to elect the mayor for Greensboro, North Carolina. Incumbent mayor Nancy Vaughan was reelected, entering a fourth term. After the 2022 election, she did not seek reelection. The election was postponed from 2021 to 2022 due to redistricting delays. The next general election has been scheduled for November 4, 2025, with the primary election scheduled to occur on October 7, with the filing period for candidates being between July 5 and 18.

== Results ==
=== Primary ===
The primary election took place on May 17, 2022.

Candidate	Party	Votes	%
Nancy Vaughan (incumbent)	Nonpartisan	18,089	44.99
Justin Outling	Nonpartisan	14,171	35.24
Mark Timothy Cummings	Nonpartisan	4,116	10.24
Eric Robert	Nonpartisan	3,833	9.53
Total		40,209	100.00
Valid votes		40,209	96.12
Invalid/blank votes		1,623	3.88
Total votes		41,832	100.00
Source: Guilford County Board of Elections

=== General election ===
The general election took place on July 26, 2022.

Candidate	Party	Votes	%
Nancy Vaughan (incumbent)	Nonpartisan	13,976	43.07
Justin Outling	Nonpartisan	13,541	41.73
Write-ins		4,931	15.20
Total		32,448	100.00
Valid votes		32,448	98.45
Invalid/blank votes		512	1.55
Total votes		32,960	100.00
Source: Guilford County Board of Elections
