= James Barnhill (artist) =

American artist (born 1955)

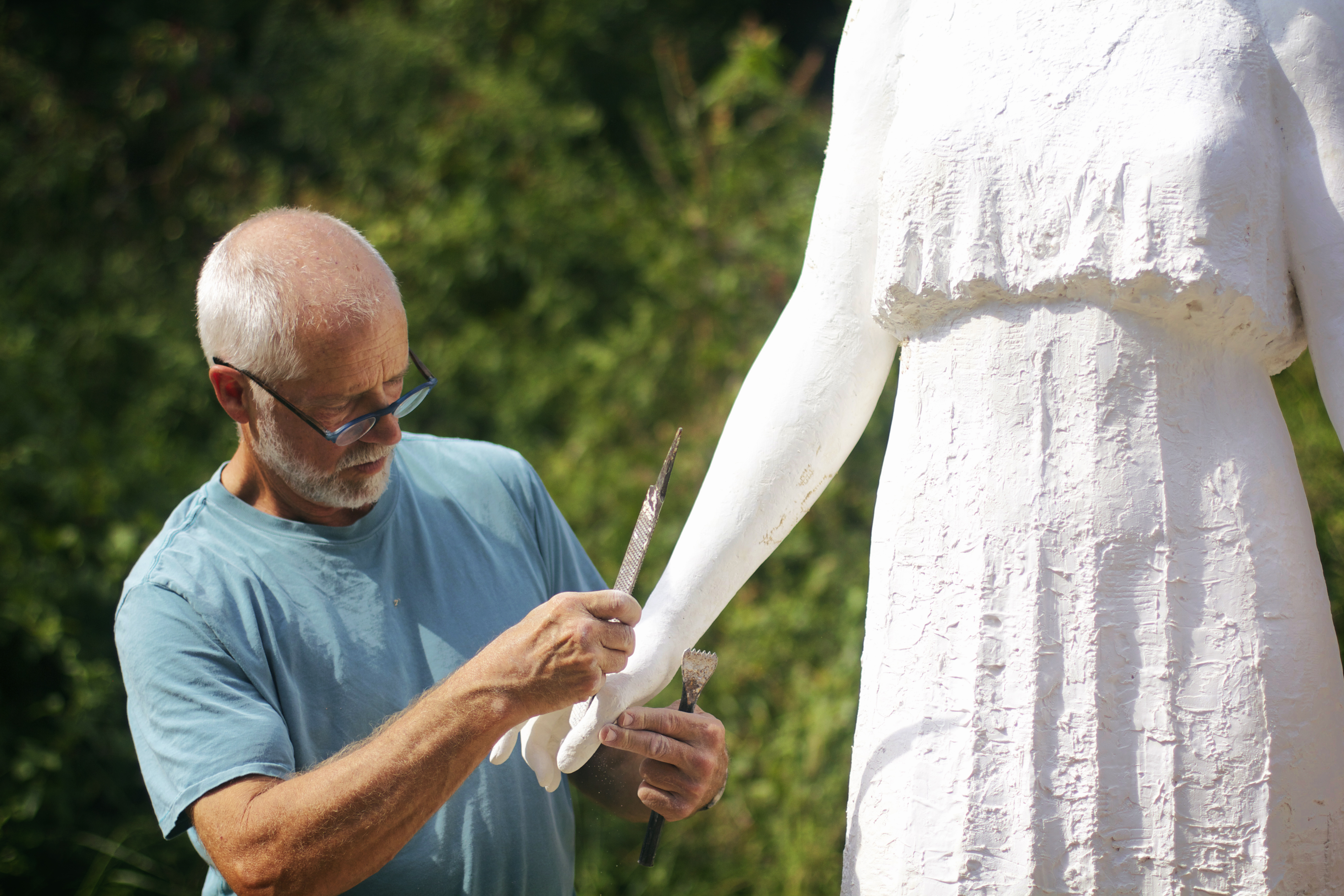
- James Barnhill in 2016
- Born: James Barnhill; 1955 (age 70–71); Asheville, North Carolina, U.S.
- Education: Master of Fine Arts in Sculpture from University of North Carolina at Greensboro (1982); Peter Agostini (professor)
- Known for: Sculpture
- Notable work: February One (2002); Minerva (2003); General Greene (2007); Angel of Montoursville (1999)
- Website: jamesbarnhill.com

James Barnhill (born 1955) is an American artist and sculptor, best known for his commissioned statues and public monuments. He currently lives and works in Greensboro, North Carolina, and is an art professor at the North Carolina Agricultural and Technical State University. His sculpture work spans more than three decades.

== Gallery ==
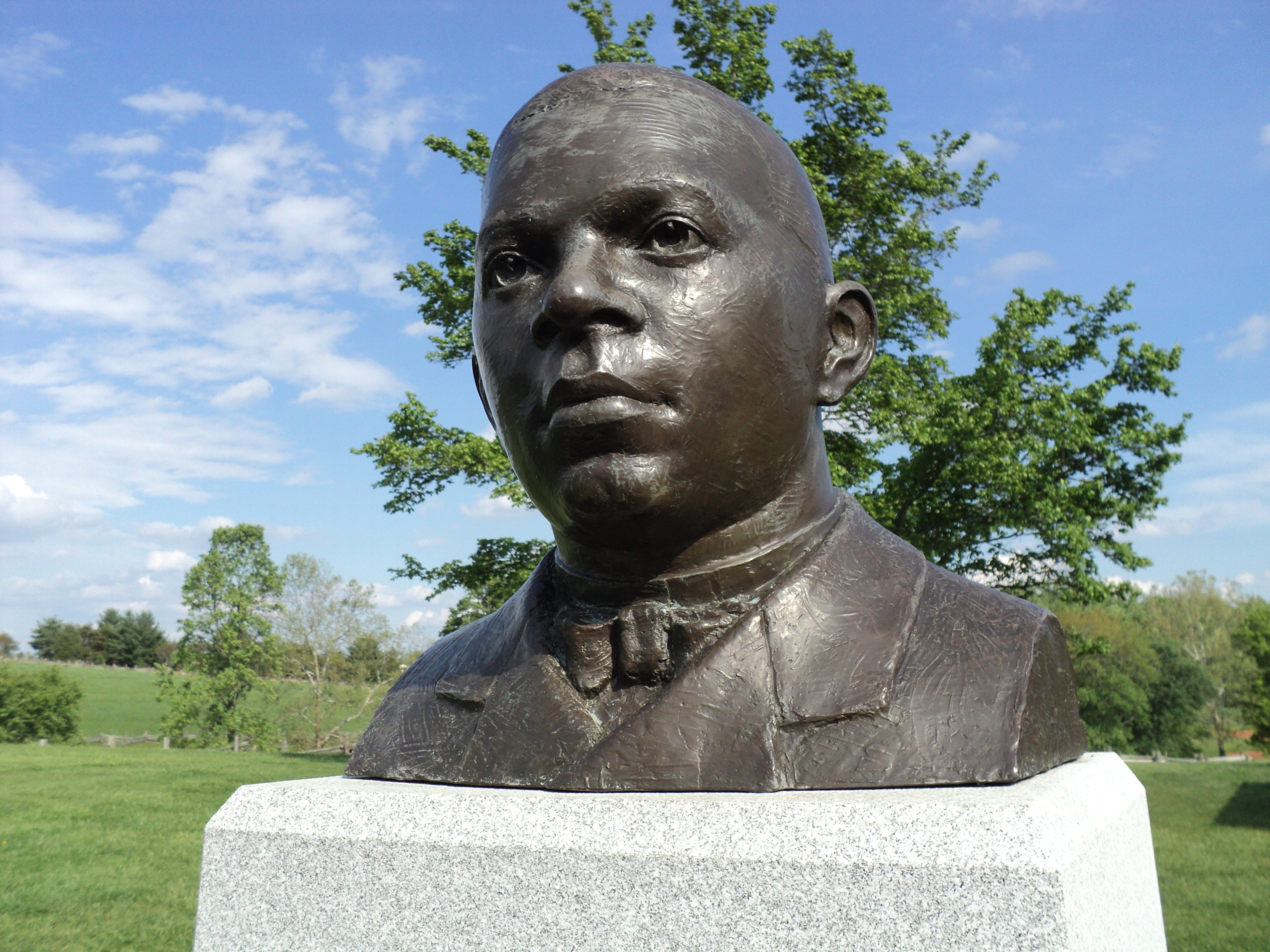
Bust of Booker T. Washington (1996) near Hardy, Virginia at the Booker T. Washington National Monument

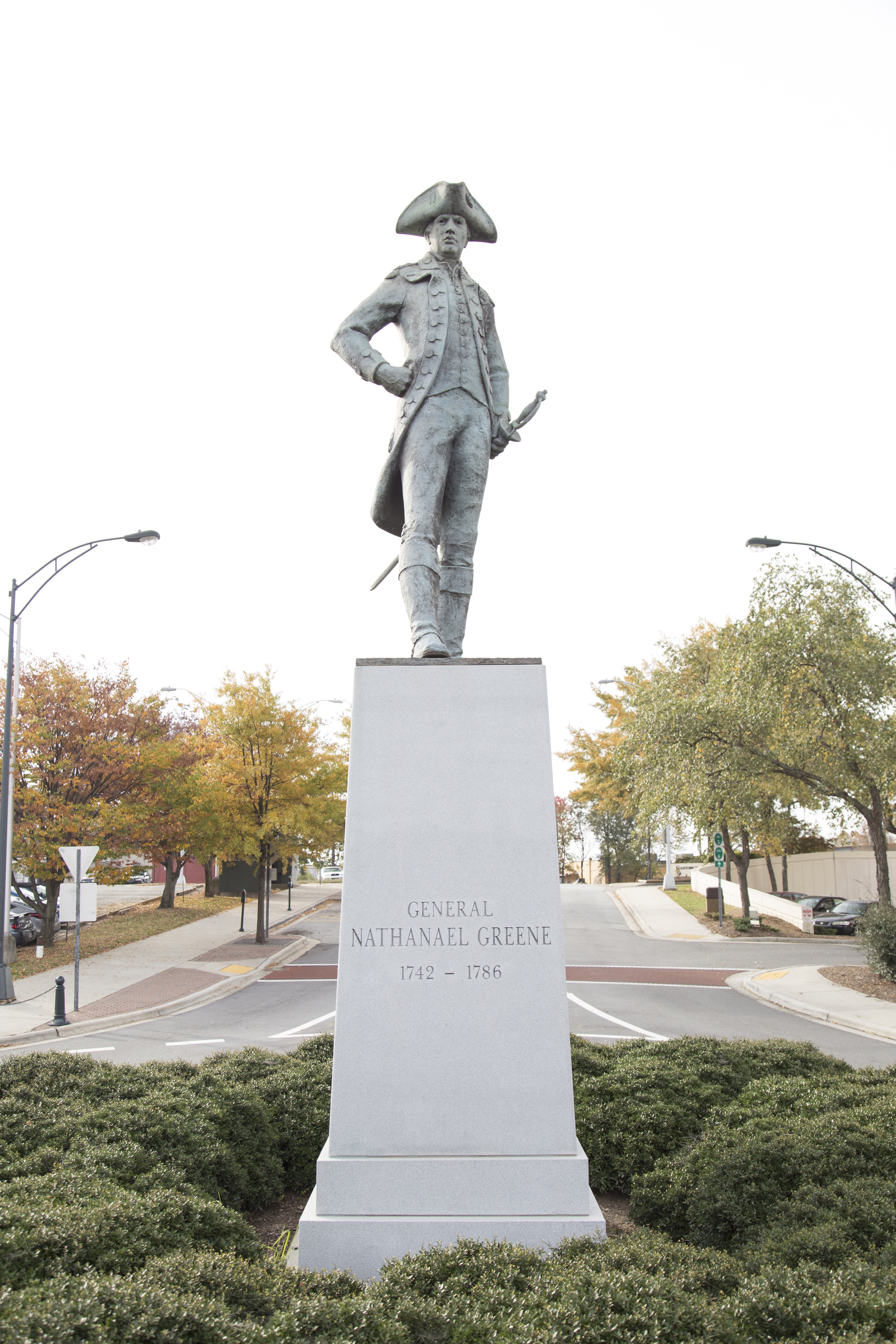
General Greene (2007), in Greensboro, North Carolina

Little Sipper (1994), in Asheville, North Carolina

Minerva (2003), in Greensboro, North Carolina

== Major works ==
Barnhill's website includes many images of his public works. The most notable include:

- General Greene (2007) Greensboro, NC
- Minerva (2003) Greensboro, NC
- February One (also referred to as the A&T Four Monument or the Greensboro Four Monument) (2002) Greensboro, NC
- The Angel of Montoursville (also referred to as the Montoursville Angel or the TWA Crash Memorial) (1999) Montoursville, PA
- The Story (1999) Hickory, NC
- Civitas (1997) Mountain Brook, AL
- Bust of Booker T. Washington (1996) near Hardy, VA at the Booker T. Washington National Monument
- Little Sipper (1994) Asheville, NC
