= J. E. Rankin =

American banker and politician

James Eugene Rankin (April 27, 1845 – February 12, 1928) was an American politician and banker. He was a leading financier in North Carolina and president of the American National Bank and the Blue Ridge Building and Loan, both in Asheville, North Carolina. The Charlotte Observer dubbed him "the dean of North Carolina's bankers".

Rankin was the six-time mayor of Asheville and chairman of the Buncombe County Commissioners for 22 consecutive years, plus two additional two terms. He was a director of the Western North Carolina Railroad and a founder and president of the Asheville Power and Light street car company.

== Early life ==
Rankin was born on April 27, 1845, in Cocke County, Tennessee. His parents were Elizabeth Roadman and William D. Rankin, a prosperous merchant in Newport, Tennessee. His family moved to Asheville when he was one year old. They built a Greek Revival house that survives today in the Montford Area Historic District. Rankin was educated in Buncombe County schools.

During the Civil War, he sided with the Confederacy. He joined Company G of North Carolina 7th Cavalry, or Woodfin's Battalion, on October 7, 1864, with the rank of First Lieutenant. He rose to the rank of captain. In the Fall of 1864, James E. Rankin was made Adjutant of the 14th North Carolina Battalion - Cavalry. He was captured by Union Troops in Franklin, North Carolina.

== Career ==
=== Business ===
After the Civil War, Rankin returned to Asheville and operated his father's mercantile business for twenty years. In 1874, he was the vice president of the Asheville branch of the Southern Life Insurance Company. For many years he was a cashier for the National Bank of Asheville, followed by being a cashier for The Western Carolina Bank. By 1879, he was the vice president of The Bank of Asheville.

In December 1880, he opened J. E. Rankin & Co., a general mercantile in Asheville. In 1891, he formed the Battery Park Bank with Frank Coxe and J. P. Sawyer and served as its cashier. During the Panic of 1896 and 1897, there was a run on the banks in Asheville in July 1897. Rankin met the run with cash and his reputation helped restore confidence in the community's banks; the Battery Park was the only bank to survive the crisis. The bank was purchased by Wachovia Bank and Trust Company in the early 1920s.

Rankin was an organizer of the Blue Ridge Building and Loan, serving as its president for thirty years. He was president and chairman of the American National Bank. He was also a founder and president of the Asheville Power and Light, a street car company later known as Carolina Power and Light Company. He was also a director of the Western North Carolina Railroad.

=== Politics ===
Rankin was a mayor of Asheville, serving one-year terms in 1873, 1874, and 1879. He was appointed chairman of the Buncombe County Commissioners for 22 consecutive years. In 1880, he represented Buncombe County at the Democratic Senatorial Convention. In 1908 and 1910, he was elected chairman of the Buncombe County Commissioners by public vote. In total, he was chair of the Buncombe County Commissioners for 26 years.

He was elected mayor of Asheville for two-year terms in 1911 and 1912, and for a four-year term in 1915, serving in that capacity from 1911 through 1919. Under his leadership, the city migrated to a commission form of government in 1915.

In total, Rankin held fifty public offices. He served on the Asheville and Buncombe County Good Roads Association and represented the group at the Southern Appalachian Good Roads Association convention in 1914. He served as an alderman of Asheville, the city's treasurer, and as the commissioner of public safety. He also served on the board of the Chamber of Commerce.

== Personal life ==
Rankin married Fannie Cocke on October 11, 1867, in Buncombe County, North Carolina. She was the daughter of William Michael Cocke, a congressman from Tennessee who moved to Asheville after the Civil War. Her grandfather was U.S. Senator William Cocke. They had six children, a daughter, Grace, and five sons, Arthur, Clarence, James, Edward. and William. Their home was at 63 Merrimon Avenue in Asheville.

Rankin was a Democrat and a member of the First Presbyterian Church of Asheville. He was a charter member of the Asheville Club. He served on the board of Mission Hospital and the Good Samaritan Mission, the latter of which he helped form. He also served on the Vance Monument Association, to establish a memorial for Governor Zebulon Vance.

On February 11, 1928, newspapers across North Carolina reported that Rankin had been ill for a week and was declining. On February 12, 1928, Rankin died in his home in Asheville at the age of 82 from bronchial pneumonia. His funeral service was held at First Presbyterian Church at 3 p.m. on February 14, 1928. He was buried in Riverside Cemetery in Asheville.

Before his burial, Rankin was laid in state at the Buncombe County Courthouse where thousands came to pay their respects. Hundreds of flower arrangements were sent from cities across North and South Carolina. In addition, the courthouse bell was rung 82 times in honor of the number of years that Rankin lived. For thirty days, the courthouse's flag was flown at half-staff, and its lobby was draped for mourning.

The Superior Court adjourned for the day and construction was halted on the new county building. The Asheville City Hall and all county offices closed for the day. Asheville's banks closed at 1 p.m. in honor of Rankin's service to the banking community. A memorial service was presented in each of Asheville's public schools which were then dismissed so that the students could view his body; hundreds of schoolchildren came through the courthouse. Dr. John E. Calfee, president of the Asheville Normal School, presented a eulogy in Rankin's honor and dismissed the 3 p.m. classes. Rankin's friend, North Carolina's Governor Angus Wilton McLean, said, "Mr. Rankin was an outstanding citizen and a well-known banker. I am very sorry to learn of his death. I had heard of his illness and had hoped he would recover."

== Honors ==
One of Asheville's schools was named in his honor while he was still alive. Rankin Street in Asheville was also named in his honor.

The Buncombe County Commissioners passed a resolution in his honor and ordered that a blank page be placed in the minutes in his memory. The Asheville City Council passed a resolution in his memory. The Asheville Clearing House Association passed a resolution honoring Rankin.
