= Statue of Nathanael Greene (Greensboro, North Carolina) =

Statue in Greensboro, North Carolina

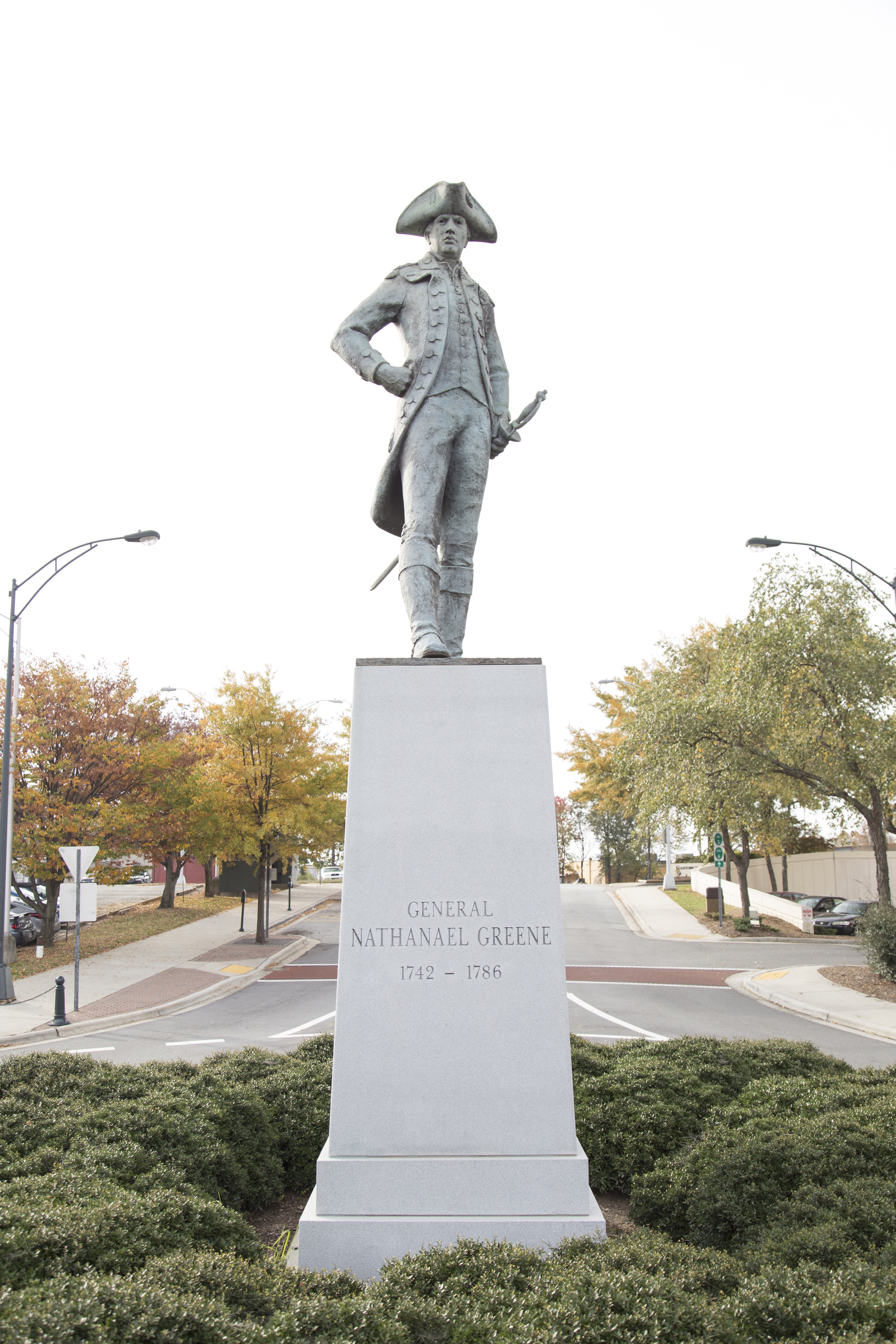
- The statue in 2015
- Artist: James Barnhill
- Year: 2008
- Completion date: 2007
- Medium: Bronze sculpture
- Subject: Nathanael Greene
- Location: Greensboro, North Carolina

The Statue of Nathanael Greene, also known as General Greene, is a sculpture in downtown Greensboro, North Carolina.

== History ==
The statue of American Revolutionary War general Nathanael Greene was designed by James Barnhill. It was installed by the Joseph M. Bryan Foundation on March 26, 2008 in downtown Greensboro, North Carolina at the Greene Street and McGee Street traffic circle. The statue, atop a 10-foot pedestal, stands at a total of 22 feet. The dedication of the statue was part of Greensboro’s Bicentennial celebrations.

The front inscription on the pedestal says "General Nathanael Greene 1712 – 1786". The back side has an inscription that says "A Gift from The Joseph M. Bryan Foundation commemorating Greensboro's Bicentennial / 2008 James Barnhill, Sculptor". On the left side of the pedestal, there is an inscription of a quote by British General Lord Cornwallis following the Battle of Guilford Courthouse, "I never saw such fighting since God made me. The Americans fought like demons." The right side bares the inscription of a quote from the Marquis de Lafayette; "… in the very name Greene are remembered all the virtues and talents which can illustrate the patriot, the statesman, and the military leader."
