= Bill Saffo =

American politician serving as mayor of Wilmington, North Carolina, United States

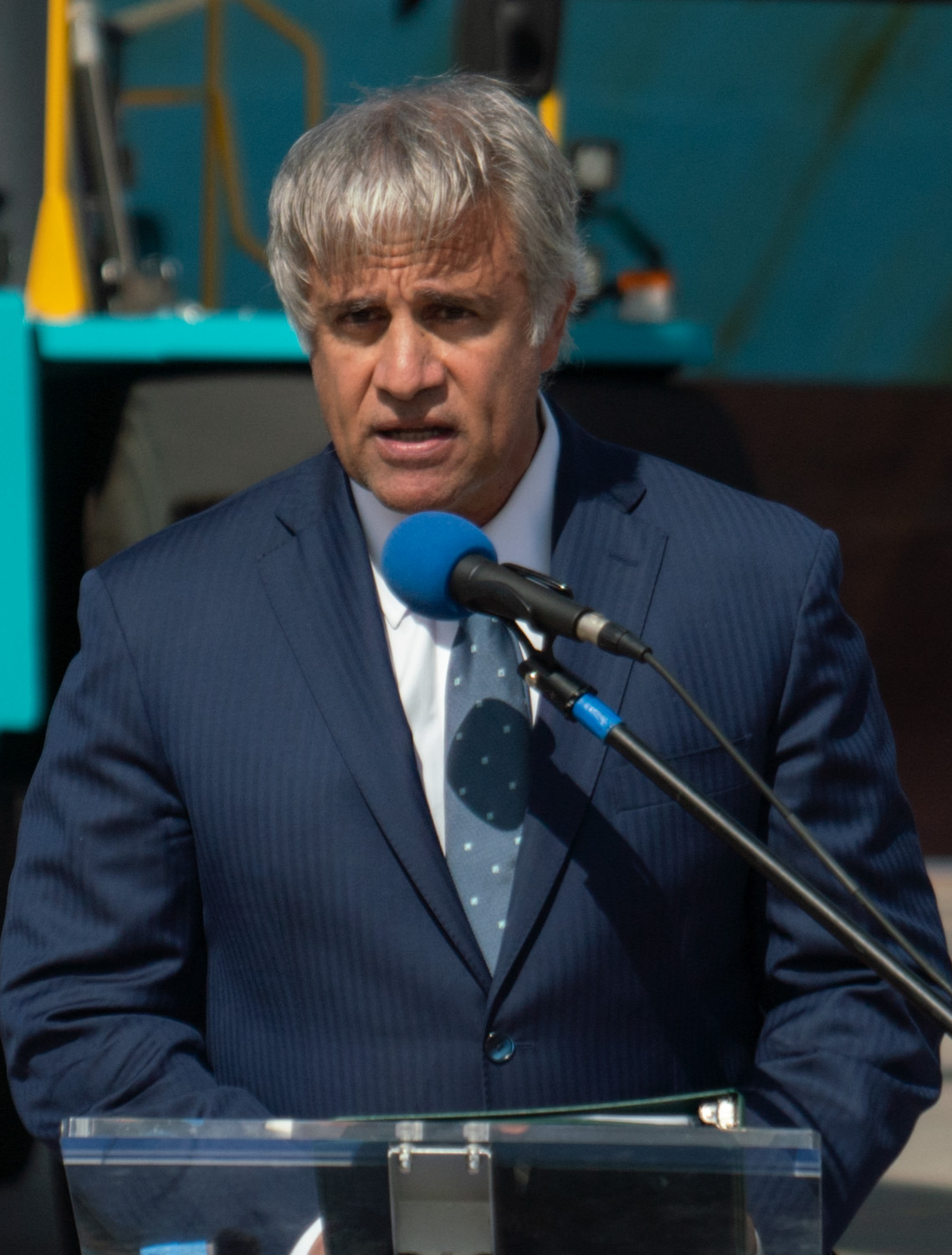
- Saffo speaking at the Port of Wilmington in 2024

Mayor of Wilmington
- Incumbent
- Assumed office June 11, 2006
- Preceded by: Spence H. Broadhurst

Member of the Wilmington City Council
- In office December 2, 2003 – July 11, 2006
- Succeeded by: Joseph C. “J.C.” Hearne II

Personal details
- Born: Vassilios Avgerinos Saffo; August 21, 1960 (age 66) Wilmington, North Carolina, U.S.
- Party: Democratic
- Education: University of North Carolina Wilmington (BA)
- Profession: Real estate businessman

Bill Saffo (born Vassilios Avgerinos Saffo; August 21, 1960) is an American politician and real estate businessman serving as the current mayor of Wilmington, North Carolina. A member of the Democratic Party, he was elected to the Wilmington City Council in November 2003, serving in the role until his appointment as mayor in December 2006.

Consecutively winning every election since assuming Wilmington's mayoralty, Saffo is the longest-serving mayor in the city's history, having last been reelected in 2025.

== Personal life and education ==
Born Vassilios Avgerinos Saffo in 1960, the son of first-generation Greek immigrants, Saffo is a native Wilmingtonian. Graduating from John T. Hoggard High School in 1978, he went on to obtain a Bachelor of Arts in political science from the University of North Carolina Wilmington. Subsequently, Saffo began working at Hanover Realty Group, a real estate firm founded by his father, Doky Saffo, in 1965. In 2010, Hanover Realty merged with Seacoast Realty, Inc., a Coldwell Banker-affiliated company, since operating as Sea Coast Advantage.

As of May 2023, in addition to the mayoralty, Saffo continues to work as a real estate agent with Sea Coast Advantage. He is a member of the St. Nicholas Greek Orthodox Church.

== Political career ==
Saffo first expressed interest in joining the Wilmington City Council in 2003, later successfully campaigning for a seat in November of the same year. In May 2006, nearing the end of Saffo's first term, Mayor Spence Broadhurst announced his upcoming relocation to Greensboro and intention to resign his position. On May 10, Saffo was nominated to fill Broadhurst's unexpired term by Mayor Pro-Tem James Quinn, a motion which was approved unanimously, with Saffo assuming the mayoralty on June 11, 2006.

During his first year in office, Saffo consolidated the city's water and sewage departments; initiated a review of the salaries of municipal employees, cautioning voters that fair salaries would require higher taxes; and began to investigate the economic potential of using revenue from the State's hotel room tax to build a new convention center, with construction underway by 2009. The convention center, which opened in 2010, is regarded as having been successful in expanding the city's convention and tourism business.

Map of the 2019 Wilmington Mayoral Election, which Saffo won narrowly against Devon Scott Legend: | Saffo 50–60% 60–70% 70–80% No Votes | Scott 40-50% 50–60% 60–70% 80–90% |

As mayor, he helped usher in the age of digital television on September 8, 2008, when Wilmington became the first city in the United States to switch over from the previous analog television platform.

Having won every mayoral election since his appointment in 2006, Saffo became Wilmington's longest-serving mayor after he again won reelection on November 7, 2017, surpassing the record set in 1937 by Walter H. Blair, who held the office for 11 years. As of 2023, Saffo is serving his eighth consecutive term as mayor.
