= Esther Manheimer =

American politician and attorney (born 1971)

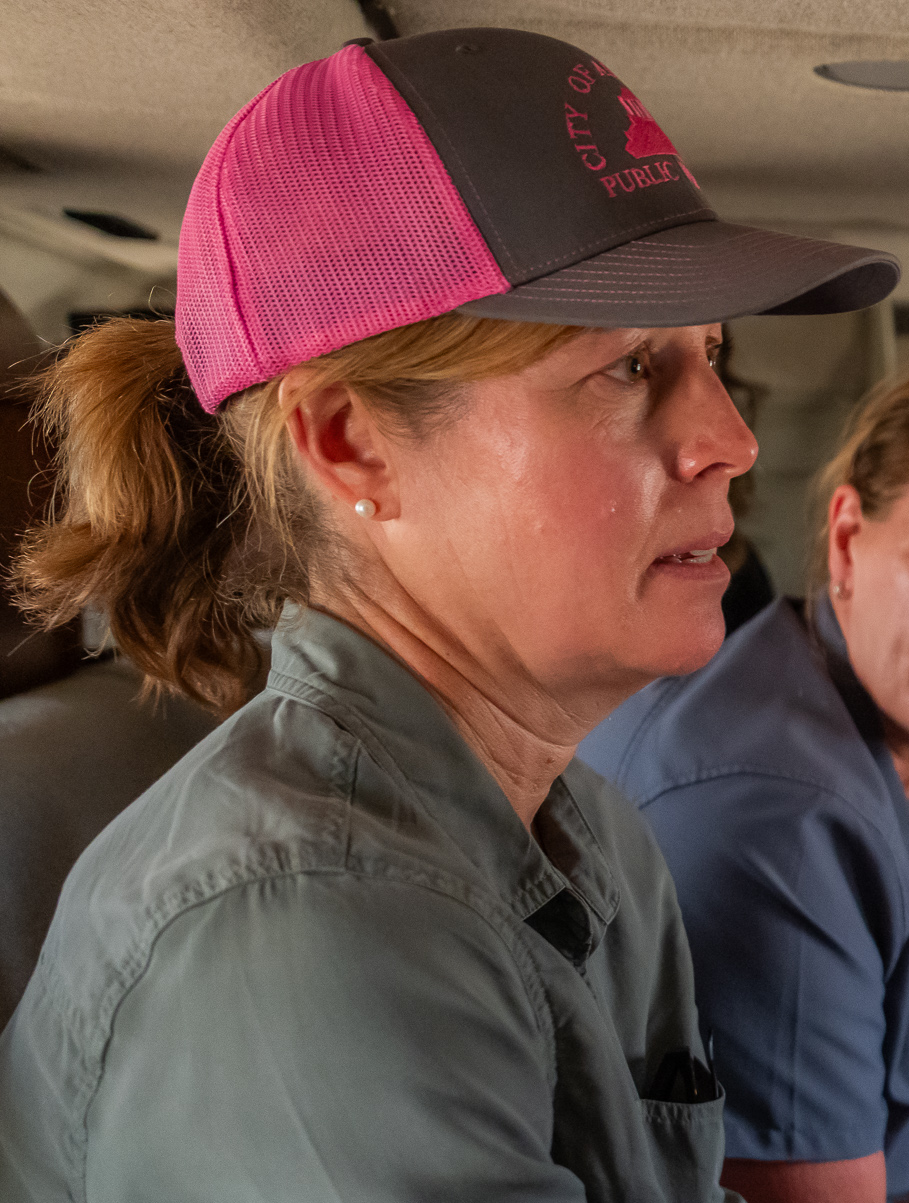
- Manheimer aboard Marine One in 2024

Mayor of Asheville, North Carolina
- Incumbent
- Assumed office December 10, 2013
- Vice Mayor: Sheneika Smith
- Preceded by: Terry Bellamy

Personal details
- Born: Esther Elizabeth Manheimer; July 24, 1971 (age 55) Skyum Bjerge, Thy, Jutland, Denmark
- Party: Democratic
- Spouse: Mark David Harris (m. 1988)
- Children: Levi Harris • Greyson Harris • Asa Harris
- Education: University of Colorado Boulder (BA); University of North Carolina at Chapel Hill (JD, MPA)
- Website: Official Website

Esther Elizabeth Manheimer (born July 24, 1971) is an American politician and attorney. She has served as the mayor of Asheville, North Carolina, since 2013.

== Early life and education ==
Manheimer was born on July 24, 1971, in the hamlet of Skyum Bjerge in Thy, Denmark, to American expat parents. She has two siblings. Her family returned to the United States when she was three, and she lived in San Diego, Olympia and Spokane, Washington, and Bethesda, Maryland before moving to Asheville when she was 17.

Manheimer graduated from the University of Colorado Boulder in 1993, and she served as campus director of the American Movement for Israel and earned a Bachelor of Arts degree in anthropology. She attended the University of North Carolina at Chapel Hill, earning degrees in law and a Master of Public Administration in 1997.

== Career ==
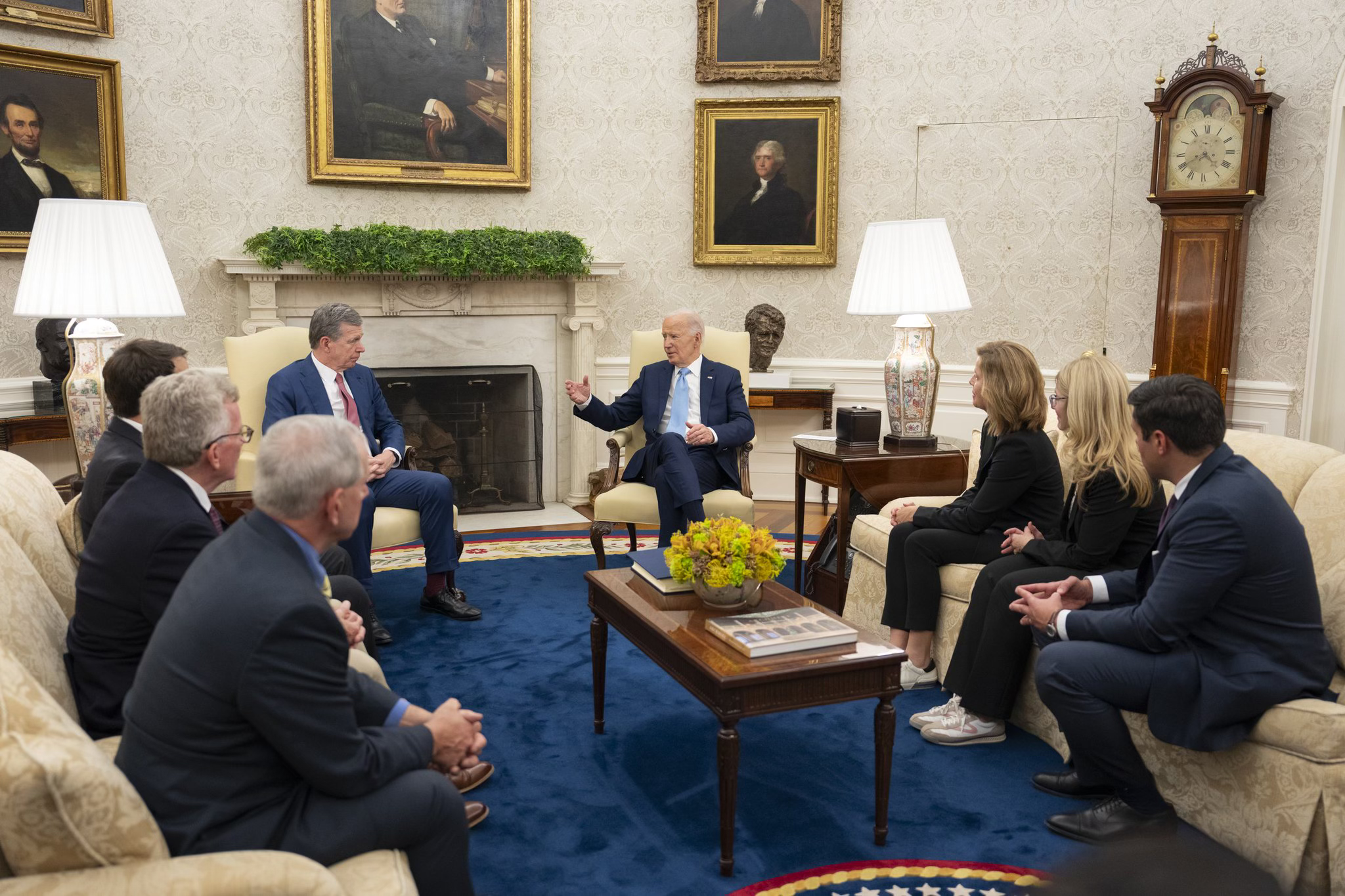
Manheimer attends a meeting in the oval office. Joe Biden, Gov. Cooper, and a Western North Carolina delegation discuss Hurricane Helene relief efforts.

After graduating with a Juris Doctor from University of North Carolina at Chapel Hill in 1998, Manheimer returned to Asheville, North Carolina in 2002, where she joined the Van Winkle Law Firm.

Manheimer is now a principal at Van Winkle and focuses on commercial litigation, land use and land disputes. She was previously an attorney for the North Carolina General Assembly.

She was elected to the Asheville City Council in 2009 and served until 2013. She was elected mayor of Asheville in 2013.

In March 2016, Manheimer spoke out against the controversial Public Facilities Privacy & Security Act, state legislation that eliminated anti-discrimination protections for the LGBTQ community.

In June 2021, Manheimer was one of 11 U.S. mayors to form Mayors Organized for Reparations and Equity (MORE), a coalition of municipal leaders dedicated to starting pilot reparations programs in their cities. Earlier, in July 2020, the Asheville City Council had "voted to approve reparations in the form of investments in areas of disparity for Black residents".

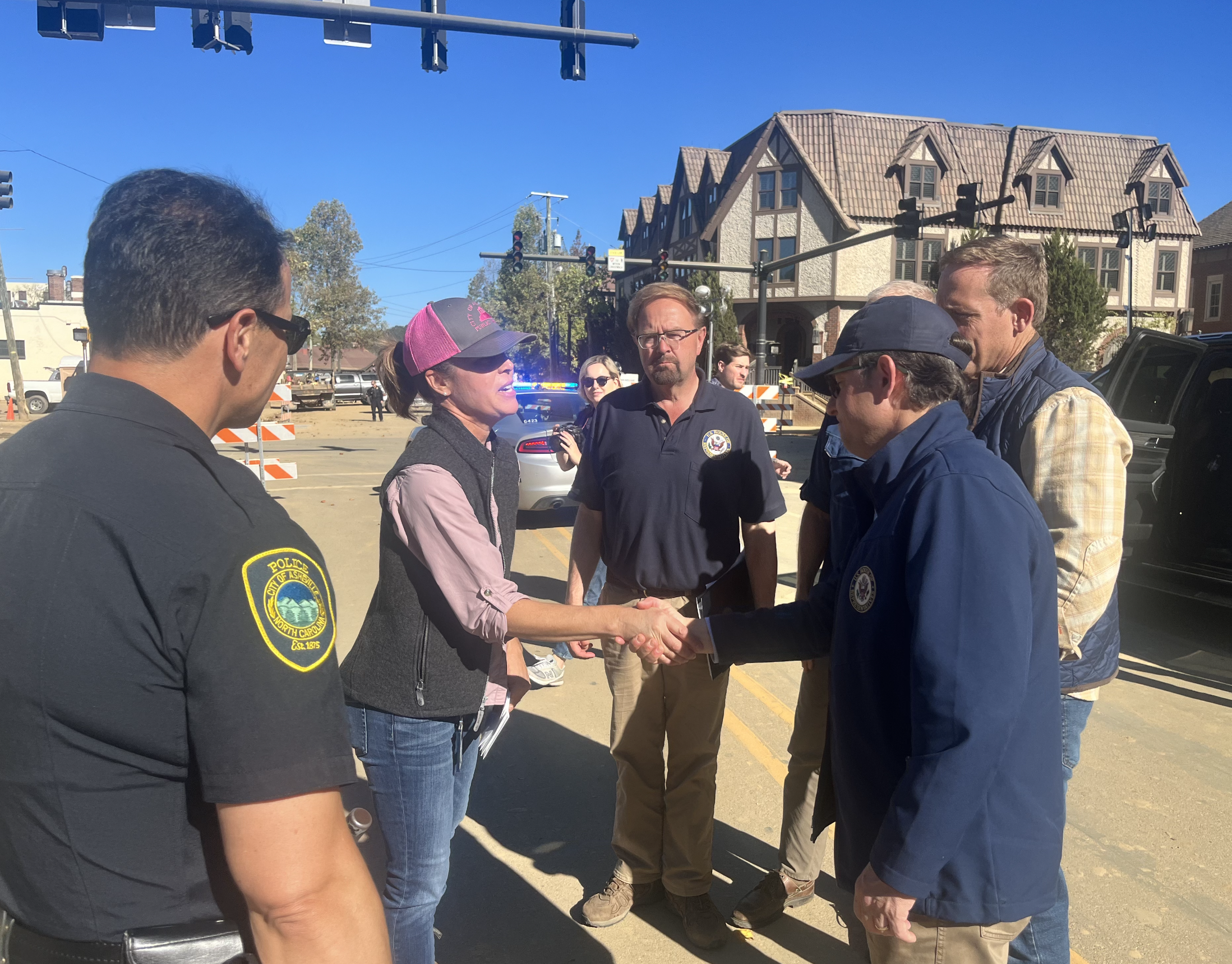
Mayor Manheimer meets speaker Mike Johnson in Biltmore Village .

In September 2024, Manheimer met with then President Joe Biden aboard Marine One alongside North Carolina Gov. Roy Cooper and FEMA Administrator Deanne Criswell to survey damages and discuss disaster relief efforts related to Hurricane Helene.

== Personal life ==
Manheimer is married to Mark Harris, long-time educator and Hall of Fame wrestling coach at Enka High School. They have three sons. She is the third Jewish mayor of Asheville, after Ken Michalove in 1989 and Leni Sitnik in 1997.

== Electoral history ==
Asheville City Council Election, 2009
Party	Candidate	Votes	%
Nonpartisan	Esther Manheimer	6,586	19.2
Nonpartisan	Gordon Smith	6,318	18.5
Nonpartisan	Cecil Bothwell	5,919	17.3
Nonpartisan	Carl Mumpower	4,754	13.9
Nonpartisan	J. Neal Jackson	3,487	10.2
Nonpartisan	Ryan Croft	2,530	7.4
Write-in		4,627	13.5
Total votes		34,221	100.0

Asheville Mayoral Election, 2013
Party	Candidate	Votes	%
Nonpartisan	Esther Manheimer	8,375	68.3
Nonpartisan	John Miall	3,810	31.1
Write-in		71	0.6
Total votes		12,256	100.0

Asheville Mayoral Election, 2017
Party	Candidate	Votes	%
Nonpartisan	Esther Manheimer (incumbent)	13,051	80.7
Nonpartisan	Martin Ramsey	3,009	18.6
Write-in		106	0.7
Total votes		16,116	100.0

Asheville Mayoral Election, 2022
Party	Candidate	Votes	%
Nonpartisan	Esther Manheimer (incumbent)	20,790	54.05
Nonpartisan	Kim Roney	17,677	45.95
Write-in			
Total votes			100.0
