= James Wimble =

English mariner and trader

- Baptised: January 31, 1696
- Disappeared: March 23, 1743 (aged 47)
- Notable work: 1738 Map of North Carolina

James Wimble (fl. January 31, 1696 – c. March 23, 1743) was an English mariner, trader, and landowner who created the premier coastal chart of North Carolina of the 18th century. Wimble sold plots of land for a settlement on the Cape Fear River in North Carolina which would eventually become Wilmington, North Carolina.

== Early life ==
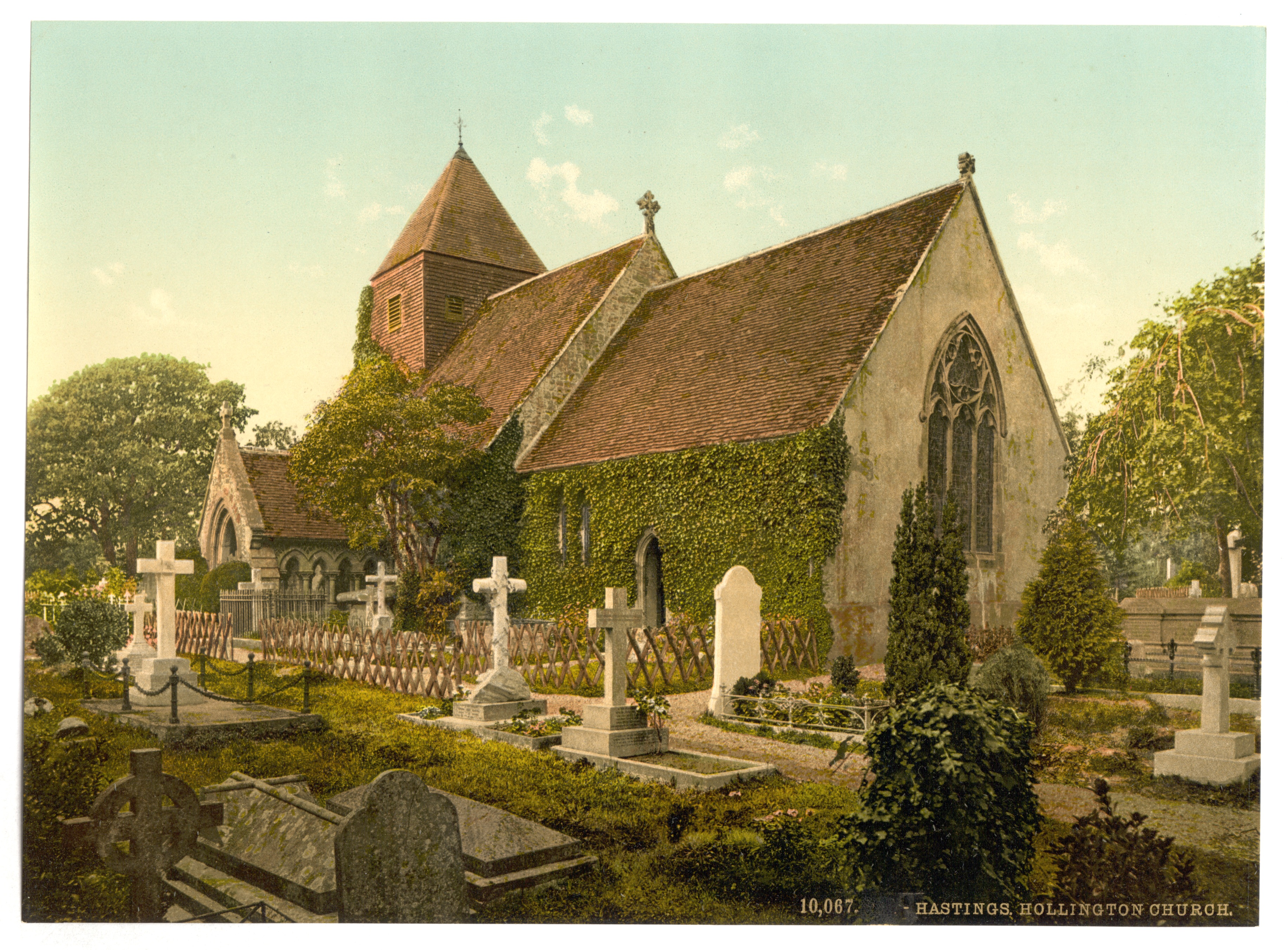
The Hollington Church in the Wood where James Wimble was baptized on January 31, 1696.

Wimble was born in Hollington near Hastings, where he was later baptized in the Hollington Church in the Wood on January 31, 1696, in the Sussex coast of England. He was the second son of James and Anne Wimble and the sixth child of ten. His correspondences throughout his life suggest that he wasn't formally schooled as a child. Wimble was trained as a seaman.

== Journey to North America ==
In 1718, Wimble built a small ship at Hastings with help from a friend and sailed to the West Indies to seek his fortune after his family faced financial hardship. In 1722, he acquired land in the Bahamas which enabled him to begin trading with the English colonies in mainland North America. He also acquired land in North Carolina, which was formally granted to him by George Burrington's council on August 4, 1723.

Wimble later moved to Boston, Massachusetts where he married Rebecca Waters, the daughter of a prominent local, on March 26, 1724. Their first son, James, was born on December 20, 1724. He owned land in the South End which he presumably operated as a distillery. While in Boston, he continued his business of moving trade goods between North Carolina and various British trade posts in the West Indies. This business enabled him to increase his land holdings in North Carolina and purchase a brigantine, which he named "Rebecca" after his wife. In 1732, Wimble lost his ship and all of its cargo to a hurricane after being forced by Governor Woodes Rogers of the Bahamas to use his ship to protect vessels and salt ponds in Rum Cay. Wimble was forced to sell a portion of his belongings, land, and slaves to cover the loss and began the process of trying to collect damages from Woodes Rogers' commandeering of his ship.

== Contributions to North Carolina ==
In 1733, Wimble and three others set out to establish a new settlement beside the Cape Fear River in North Carolina. Wimble acquired 305 acres from a local planter which on April 16, 1733, he began to sell in plots for the settlement of "New Carthage" or "New Liverpool". The settlement came to be known as "New town" or "Newton" before ultimately being officially named Wilmington after the Earl of Wilmington, the patron of North Carolina's governor Gabriel Johnston, on February 25, 1739.

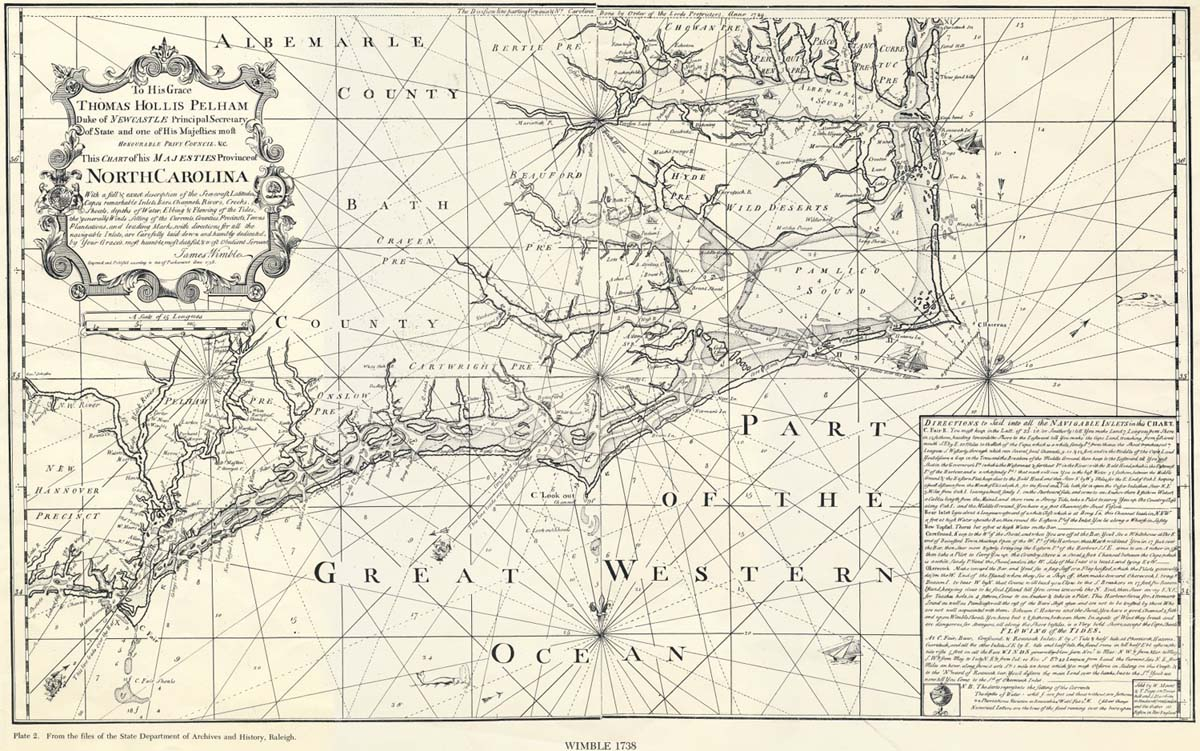
James Wimble's map was the most detailed map of coastal North Carolina during the late eighteenth century.

On the same day that Wimble began selling his acquired land, he produced a map of coastal North Carolina which included remarkable detail of the water features of the province. For the next two years, he continued to sell plots of his acquired land while operating a sloop between North Carolina and Charleston, South Carolina. He encountered further hardship in 1735 due to a lack of plot purchases and suffering raids from Spanish marauders which led to him unsuccessfully appeal for a government position from the Duke of Newcastle Thomas Pelham-Holles. Wimble dedicated an improved map of coastal North Carolina to the Duke of Newcastle which was published by Mount & Page, a renowned English marine chart publisher, in 1738. This map, titled "This Chart of his Majesties Province of North Carolina", was the premier coastal chart of North Carolina during the late eighteenth century and Wimble's permanent accomplishment. The only geographical feature in modern maps to include Wimble's name is Wimble Shoals, a dangerous sandbank north of Cape Hatteras, and is included in this map.

== Attempts to collect compensation ==
In 1737 and early 1738, Wimble began selling plots of his purchased land to fund a trip to London to collect compensation for his lost vessel. Once he arrived in London, he wrote a letter to the Duke of Newcastle requesting his support. The Duke responded to Wimble's plea by writing a letter to the Commissioners for Trade and Plantations on February 22, 1737, requesting them to consider Wimble's petition for compensation for the losses he sustained as a result of Roger's impressment. Despite this plea and supporting documents provided by Wimble, the Commissioners denied Wimble's request due to a lack of evidence. Wimble returned to America and gathered affidavits directly from two men who worked with Rogers to further support his claim. He returned to the Commissioners in the Spring of 1740 with these accounts and a detailed list of his losses, but the Commissioners responded by refusing to reconsider their former decision. The Duke of Newcastle intervened and forced the case to be reopened, but the Commissioners once again dismissed Wimble's request.

Wimble attempted to retrieve his losses through privateering in the War of Jenkins' Ear, but lost a sloop he had purchased and his left arm in an encounter with a Spanish ship.

The last account of Wimble was a report from Newport, Rhode Island on March 23, 1743, that stated that Wimble had lost his vessel "on Cuba". Further information regarding the rest of his life is unknown.

== Bibliography ==
- Cumming, William P. (January 1969). "The Turbulent Life of Captain James Wimble". The North Carolina Historical Review. 46 (1): 1–18. JSTOR 23517928.
