= B. D. Schwartz =

North Carolina politician

Member of the North Carolina Senate
- In office 1978–1980

Member of the North Carolina House of Representatives
- In office 1972–1978

Mayor of Wilmington
- In office 1970s

Personal details
- Born: Berek Schwartzblatt; January 17, 1909 Poland
- Died: July 11, 2001 (aged 92)
- Spouse: Sylvia Wolk (m. 1931; died 1997)
- Education: University of North Carolina in Chapel Hill

Benjamin David Schwartz (born Berek Schwartzblatt; January 17, 1909 – July 11, 2001), also known as B. D. Schwartz, was a businessman and politician in North Carolina. He was Mayor of Wilmington in the 1970s and served in the North Carolina House of Representatives and North Carolina Senate. He moved to the United States from Poland with his family when he was four years old.

Schwartz was in the state house from 1972 to 1978 and in the state senate from 1978 to 1980. Schwartz Hall at UNC Wilmington is named for him. His brother Bill was on Wilmington's city council and as mayor.
