= Yvonne Johnson =

American politician (1942–2024)

46th Mayor of Greensboro
- In office December 2007 – December 2009
- Preceded by: Keith Holliday
- Succeeded by: Bill Knight

Personal details
- Born: October 26, 1942 Greensboro, North Carolina, U.S.
- Died: December 4, 2024 (aged 82)
- Party: Democratic
- Spouse: Walter Johnson
- Education: Bennett College (BA); North Carolina A&T State University (MS)
- Profession: Educator

Yvonne Johnson (October 26, 1942 – December 4, 2024) was an American politician who was the 46th Mayor of Greensboro, North Carolina, from 2007 until 2009. She was previously a member of the Greensboro City Council for 14 years, beginning in 1993 and Mayor Pro-Tem for 6 years. Johnson was the first African-American to serve as Greensboro's mayor.

== Life ==
Johnson grew up in Greensboro, and experienced segregation from a young age. She was a Girl Scout and attended Bennett College, where she became involved in civil rights activism. She participated in sit-ins, once being incarcerated for three days following a demonstration, and walked in the 1963 March on Washington. She graduated from Bennett in 1964, and went on to earn a master's degree in guidance and counseling from North Carolina A&T.

In 1982, Johnson became the leader of local non-profit One Step Further, a United Way Agency in Greensboro that provides mediation and court alternative programs to Greensboro's youth. She served as their executive director until early 2024. Johnson also worked as a workshop facilitator, focusing on topics of diversity and racism.

Johnson joined the Greensboro City Council in 1993, serving until 2007; she was Mayor Pro-Tem of the council from 2001 until 2007. She was the first African-American woman to hold the Mayor Pro-Tem position. As a city council member, she supported the establishment of a civil rights museum in Greensboro's Woolworth's, site of the Greensboro sit-ins, and the Greensboro Truth and Reconciliation Commission, which investigated the events of the 1979 Greensboro massacre.

From 2007 to 2009, she served as mayor of Greensboro, North Carolina, becoming the first African-American to serve as Greensboro's mayor. Johnson lost her reelection bid in 2009 to Republican political newcomer Bill Knight. In 2011, she ran for election again, this time for an at-large city council seat, having garnered the most votes of any candidate in the October 2011 city primary. In the November 2011 election, Johnson won the majority of the at-large vote, reclaiming her city council position of Mayor Pro-Tem.

In February 2010, the Greensboro Economic Development Alliance (GEDA) awarded her with the Stanley Frank Lifetime Achievement Award. Johnson served on the board of directors for Malachi House and was the Women's Resource Center's first president. She also served on boards for Greensboro Housing Coalition, Foster Friends, Sports Dreams and the Greensboro Arts Council.

== Personal life and death ==
Johnson was married to Walter Johnson, who is an attorney; they had four children. She was a member of the Episcopal church.

Johnson died on December 4, 2024, at the age of 82.

== See also ==
- List of first African-American mayors
