= Nancy Vaughan =

American politician

49th Mayor of Greensboro
- In office December 3, 2013 – December 2, 2025
- Preceded by: Robbie Perkins
- Succeeded by: Marikay Abuzuaiter

Mayor pro tempore of Greensboro
- In office 2007–2013

Personal details
- Born: February 26, 1961 (age 65) New Jersey, U.S.
- Party: Democratic
- Spouse: Don Vaughan (divorced)
- Children: 3
- Relatives: Fred Barakat (father)
- Education: Fairfield University

Nancy Vaughan (born Nancy Barakat, and formerly Nancy Mincello) is an American politician who served as the 49th mayor of Greensboro, North Carolina from December 3, 2013 to December 2, 2025. Having previously served on the city council in district 4 and at large, she was elected mayor on November 5, 2013, with 59% of the vote. Vaughan was sworn in on December 3, 2013. She was reelected in 2015, 2017 and 2022.

Vaughan served as the executive director of the Guilford Green Foundation, an LGBT advocacy group, from February 2016 until January 2018.

== Early life ==
Vaughan was born and raised in New Jersey. She is the daughter of Fred Barakat.

== Political career ==
Greensboro first elected Vaughan to city council in 1997 in council district 4. She served two terms before leaving to raise her daughter, Catherine. Before her first council run, she had become known for leading a fight against the city's plans for a tract of land formerly owned by Jefferson Pilot. She was petitioning to stop them from re-zoning for higher density. Her talking points during her first run included expanding the city's landfill and water capacity, and increasing Greensboro's size through annexation.

She ran again at-large in 2007, where she served as Mayor Pro tem until becoming mayor in 2013.

=== Tenure as Mayor ===
Vaughan went under criticism for enforcing an arbitrary code of conduct at city council meetings. These rules prohibit members of the public from speaking on matters "in litigation" or speaking in a way that Vaughan "deem[s] to be an 'attack'" on any city employee during meetings. This move was criticized by citizens, watch groups, and multiple members of city council who say they were not informed of the code of conduct before Vaughan began enforcing it at the October 2 city council meeting.

On March 13, 2020, Vaughan declared a state of emergency in response to the COVID-19 pandemic. On March 27, she issued a stay-at-home order for the city of Greensboro, which expired April 16, after which Greensboro fell under the jurisdiction of the state's stay-at-home order. On June 23, she issued an emergency order requiring all people to wear face coverings in public within Greensboro city limits in order to curb the spread of the pandemic.

In response to protests stemming from the 2020 George Floyd protests, the mayor ordered a city-wide curfew. The ACLU of North Carolina called the order unconstitutional and "overbroad", saying it "gives police too much discretion over whom to arrest and will likely lead to selective law enforcement against communities of color." Local news media drew attention to the contrast in enforcement. The Greensboro Police Department arrested and charged several black men for protesting while carrying firearms, while white men associated with the white supremacist Stokes County Militia group carrying guns and paramilitary gear were not approached by police.

Vaughan announced that she would not seek re-election at the end of her term which ended on December 2, 2025.
