= Mayor of Greensboro, North Carolina =

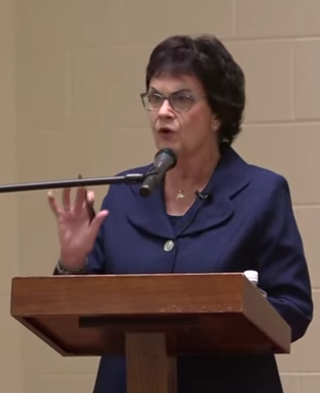
- Incumbent; Marikay Abuzuaiter since December 2, 2025
- Member of: Greensboro City Council
- Seat: Melvin Municipal Office Building, Greensboro, North Carolina
- Term length: Four years
- Constituting instrument: City Charter of Greensboro
- Precursor: Intendant of Police of Greensboro, North Carolina
- Formation: 1857
- First holder: Charles G. Yates

The Mayor of Greensboro, North Carolina is Democrat Marikay Abuzuaiter who took office in December 2025 after the 2025 mayoral election.

Greensboro operates with council-manager government, under which the mayor is elected separately from Greensboro City Council.

Greensboro mayors serve four year terms with no term limits. Elections are held as non-partisan.

== List of mayors ==
#	Mayor	Term start	Term end
1	Charles G. Yates	1857	1861
2	Alexander P. Eckel	1861	1863
3	Richard Sterling	1864	1865
4	William L. Scott	1865	1869
5	R. M. Sloan	1870	1873
6	Cyrus P. Mendenhall	1874	1876
7	S. C. Dodson	1877	1883
8	R. R. King Sr.	1883	1885
9	J. A. Barringer	1887	1888
10	James W. Forbis	1889	1891
11	J. R. Mendenhall	1892	1893
12	John A. Barrninger	1893	1894
13	James E. Boyd	1894	1895
14	J. J. Nelson	1895	1898
15	Z. V. Taylor	1899	1900
16	William H. Osborne	1901	1903
17	T. J. Murphy	1905	1907
18	L. J. Brandt	1907	1909
19	E. J. Stafford	1909	1911
20	T.J. Murphy	1911	1917
21	E. J. Stafford (2 terms)	1917	1921
22	Claude Kiser	1921	1923
23	E. B. Jeffress	1925	1927
24	R. R. King Jr.	1927	1929
25	Paul C. Lindley	1931	1933
26	Roger W. Harrison (resigned)	1933	1937
27	Ralph L. Lewis (resigned)	1939	1940
28	Huger King	1940	1941
29	W. H. Sullivan	1942	1943
30	C. M. Vanstory Jr.	1945	1947
31	Fielding L. Fry	1947	1949
32	Benjamin Cone	1949	1951
33	Robert H. Frazier	1951	1953
34	R. Boyd Morris (resigned)	1955	1956
35	J. Archie Cannon Jr.	1956	1957
36	George H. Roach	1957	1961
37	David Schenck	1961	1965
38	W. L. Trotter Jr.	1965	1967
39	Carson Bain	1967	1969
40	H. J. Elam III	1969	1971
41	Jim Melvin (5 terms)	1971	1981
42	John W. Forbis (3 terms)	1981	1987
43	Vic Nussbaum Jr. (3 terms)	1987	1993
44	Carolyn S. Allen (3 terms)	1993	1999
45	Keith Holliday (4 terms)	1999	2007
46	Yvonne Johnson	2007	2009
47	William H. Knight	2009	2011
48	Robbie Perkins	2011	2013
49	Nancy Vaughan (3 terms)	2013	2025
50	Marikay Abuzuaiter	2025	present

== See also ==
- Timeline of Greensboro, North Carolina
