= Marikay Abuzuaiter =

American politician

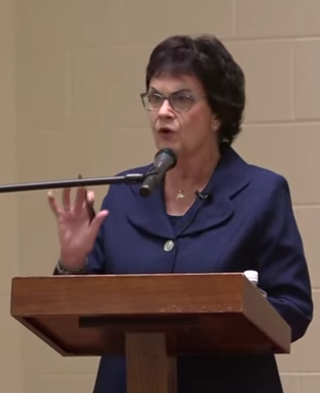
- Marikay Abuzuaiter in 2025

50th Mayor of Greensboro
- Incumbent
- Assumed office December 2, 2025
- Preceded by: Nancy Vaughan

Mayor pro tempore of Greensboro
- In office December 2, 2025 – January 7, 2025

Personal details
- Born: November 11, 1954 (age 71) Greensboro, North Carolina, U.S.
- Party: Democratic
- Spouse: Isa Abuzuaiter
- Children: 2
- Education: Greensboro College

Marikay Abuzuaiter (born November 11, 1954) is an American politician who is serving as the 50th mayor of Greensboro, North Carolina, since December 2, 2025. She previously served as Mayor Pro tem and served on the Greensboro City Council.

== Early life ==
Abuzuaiter was born in Greensboro and raised in Middlesboro, Kentucky. Before entering politics, She was a small business owner in Greensboro for over two decades. She owned and operated Mahi's Restaurant for 22 years.

== Political career ==
Abuzuaiter was first elected to the Greensboro City Council as an At-Large member in 2011. She was later selected by her peers to serve as Mayor Pro Tempore.

In the November 2025 municipal election, Abuzuaiter was elected Mayor of Greensboro, succeeding outgoing mayor Nancy Vaughan, who did not seek re-election. She was officially sworn into office on December 2, 2025.

During her tenure as a council member, she worked to improve public safety, infrastructure, and community collaboration.

Abuzuaiter was involved in the development of the Guilford County Family Justice Center, an organization that coordinates services for victims of domestic violence and abuse. She also supported efforts to increase police officer salaries within the Greensboro Police Department.

As the Chair of the Municipal Planning Organization/Transportation Advisory Committee (MPO/TAC) and the Piedmont Authority for Regional Transportation (PART), she was involved in regional transportation planning, including the Greensboro Urban Loop project.

She supported the city's "Road to 10K" initiative, which aimed to encourage the development of diverse housing options.
