= Asheville Rides Transit =

Public transportation in Asheville, North Carolina

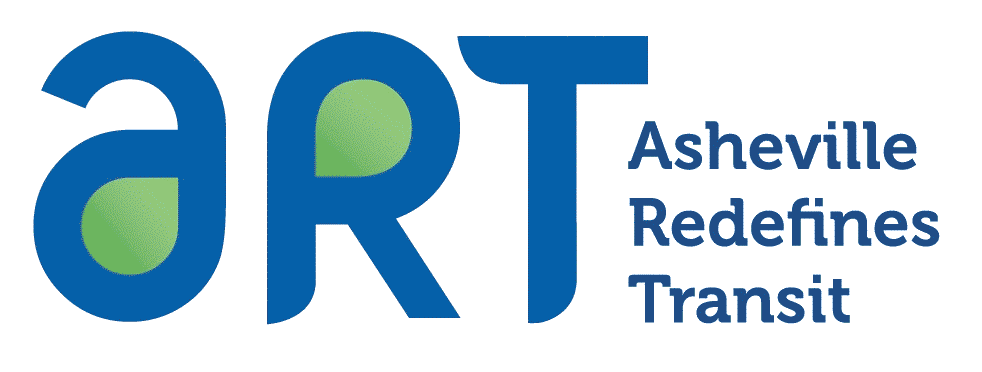

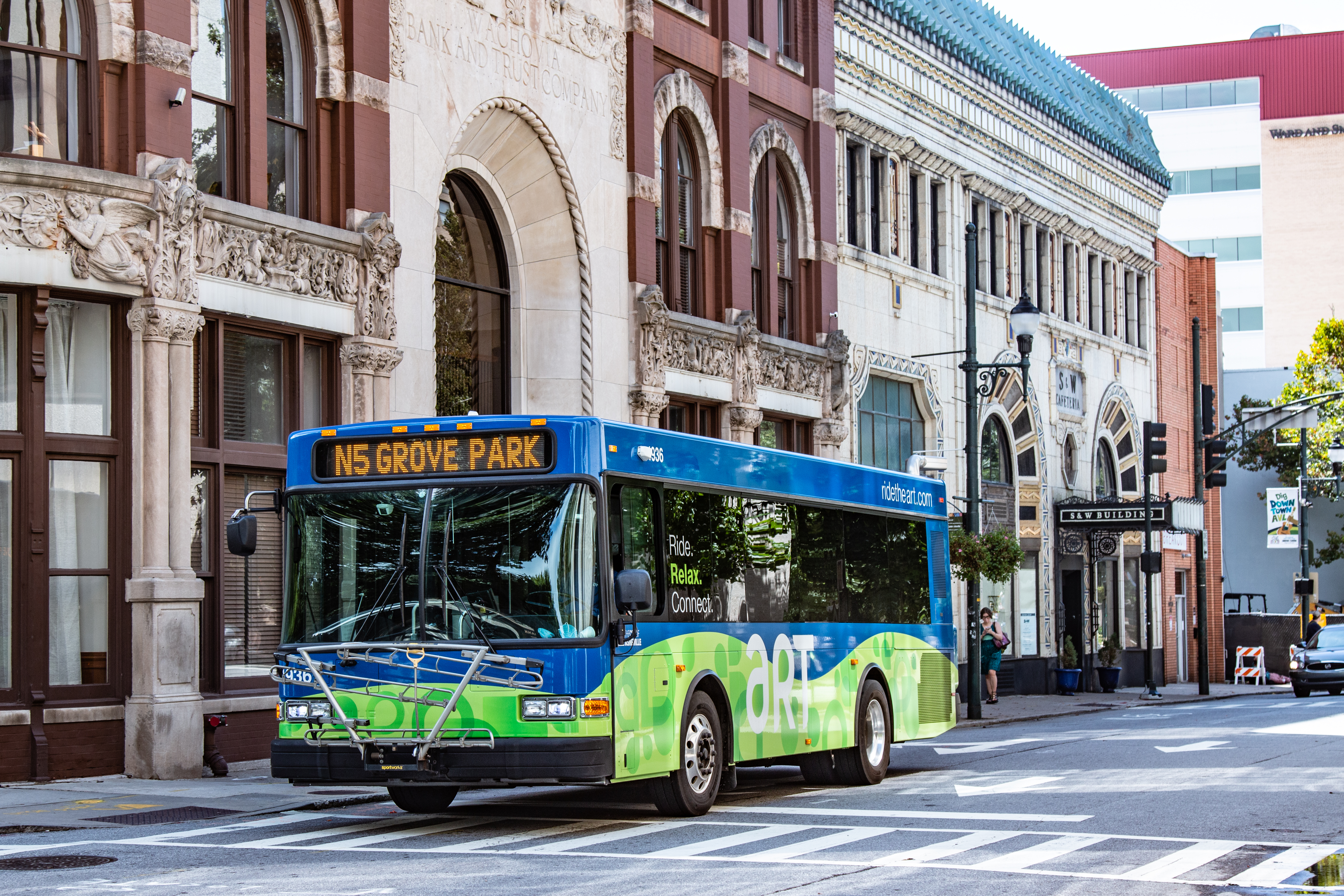
- ART bus in downtown Asheville, 2020
- Headquarters: 360 West Haywood Street, Asheville, North Carolina
- Locale: Asheville, North Carolina
- Service area: Buncombe County, North Carolina
- Service type: Bus service, paratransit
- Routes: 17
- Destinations: Pisgah View Apartments; Hillcrest Apartments; Walmart (on Tunnel); Haywood & Louisiana area; Asheville Mall; Mission Hospital; UNCA
- Stations: 49 Coxe Avenue, Asheville, North Carolina
- Fleet: 21
- Daily ridership: 3,895/day approx
- Annual ridership: 1,421,693/year approx
- Fuel type: Diesel, hybrid, electric
- Operator: RATP Dev
- Website: ridetheart.com

Asheville Rides Transit (ART) is the municipally owned operator of public transportation in Asheville, North Carolina. The agency provides service from 5:30 a.m. to 10:30 p.m. on Monday through Saturday; and from 8:30 a.m. to 6:30 p.m. on Sundays and Holidays. The standard fare is $1. The main and only station is located at 49 Coxe Avenue, Asheville, NC 28801.

== History ==
In 1889, Asheville opened the first electric streetcar system in North Carolina, and the second in the South. Like most streetcar systems, services were provided by private operators. By 1907, more than 3 million rides were taken per year, and the system ran north to Weaverville, North Carolina and west across the French Broad River to West Asheville. However, the system was shuttered by 1934, and in 1942 the tracks were removed, with service replaced with buses. The predecessor to ART came about in 1967, when the City of Asheville purchased the White Transportation Company's equipment and franchise rights, forming the Asheville Transportation Agency.

In 2009, the City of Asheville commissioned a plan for an overhaul of the transit system. The consulting team, HDR, conducted rider surveys and held several public input events. The final report recommended many changes, including adding Sunday service on the most popular routes, removing Saturday service on some routes, and ending the practice of renumbering evening routes.

Route changes began to occur in conjunction with the annual "Strive Not to Drive" week, in late May 2012. The plan also recommended purchasing a few new buses at a time so as to stagger the retirement dates of older buses. In early 2011, several new hybrid buses entered the fleet as the first implementation of this recommendation. As part of the plan, the name of ART was changed from Asheville Redefines Transit to Asheville Rides Transit.

In 2026, RATP Dev was awarded the contract to manage ART.

== Route list ==
#	Route name	Major destinations
N	North	Klondyke, Montford, Downtown, MLK, Charlotte, Grove Park
N1	North 1	ART Station, Merrimon, UNCA, Lakeshore
N2	North 2	ART Station, Merrimon, UNCA, Beaverdam
N3	North 3	ART Station, Chamber, Hillcrest
S1	South 1	ART Station, Biltmore, Hospital, Biltmore Village, London, Shiloh, Caribou, Rock Hill, Sweeten Creek
S2	South 2	ART Station, Biltmore, Hospital, Forest Hill, Kenilworth, Chunns Cove, Social Security
S3	South 3	ART Station, Asheland, McDowell, Biltmore Village, Hendersonville Road, Airport
S4	South 4	ART Station, S. French Broad, Depot, Livingston Heights, AB Tech
S5	South 5	Biltmore Avenue, Biltmore Village, Fairview Road Kohls/Walmart, Wood Ave
S6	South 6	ART Station, McDowell, Biltmore Village, Hendersonville Road, Biltmore Park
E1	East 1	ART Station, Tunnel, Asheville Mall, South Tunnel, Wal-Mart, Swannanoa River, VA
E2	East 2	ART Station, Asheville Mall, Haw Creek, Tunnel
W1	West 1	ART Station, Hilliard, Clingman, Haywood, PVA, Deaverview Area
W2	West 2	ART Station, Hilliard, Clingman, Haywood, PVA, Brevard, Tanger Outlets Asheville
W3	West 3	ART Station, Patton, Goodwill
W4	West 4	ART Station, Patton, New Leicester, Land of Sky
W5	West 5	Patton, North Louisiana, Emma
170	170	ART Station, Tunnel Rd, Warren Wilson, Swannanoa, Black Mountain

Schedule and route changes were made in January 2015.

== Funding ==
For FY 2012-2013, ART's operating budget was $5 million. The entire Transit Fund revenue is derived from three primary sources: federal and state grant funding ($2.8 million), local tax support ($1.2 million), and passenger charges.

== Paratransit Service ==
Asheville contracts with Mountain Mobility to provide paratransit service. This service is provided within 3/4 mile (1.2 km) of fixed ART routes and within the City of Asheville. This service is mandated by the Americans with Disabilities Act.

== Strive Not To Drive ==
Strive Not To Drive is a week-long program in the City of Asheville that promotes multimodal transit and the environment. In 2014, it included such events as a Ride of Silence, a Leadership Ride and a reduced fare promotion.

== Fleet ==
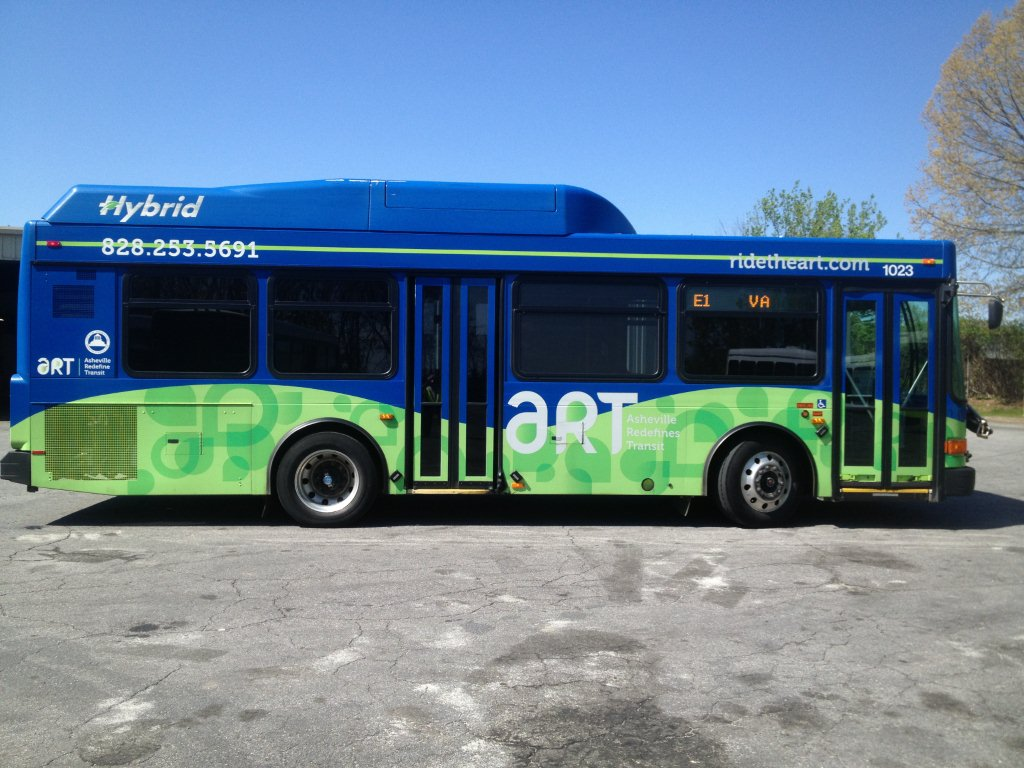
ART bus

ART operates a fleet of buses powered by diesel, hybrid diesel-electric, and fully electric buses made by Gillig and Proterra. In 2019, ART purchased five electric buses from Proterra, with the intention of purchasing more in the future. In 2020, they purchased electric buses from Vicinity Motor Corp.
