= S&W Cafeteria =

- Industry: Restaurant chain
- Founded: 1920
- Defunct: 1990s
- Headquarters: Charlotte, North Carolina
- Key people: Frank Odell Sherrill and Frederick Rufus Webber, founders
- Products: Southern food

S&W Cafeteria was a Charlotte, North Carolina–based chain of cafeteria-style restaurants. The chain specialized in low-cost, Southern-style food. Branches were located in the Southeastern United States from Washington, D.C. to Atlanta, Georgia.

== History ==
The company was organized in 1920 by Frank Odell Sherrill and Fred Weber, who had served as mess sergeants together in World War I. The operation originated at Ivey's department store which was located in Charlotte. The initial restaurant was located at 100 W. Trade Street in downtown Charlotte. By 1934, when the first Washington, D.C. location opened, cafeterias were located in Atlanta, Georgia; Asheville, Charlotte, and Raleigh, North Carolina; Chattanooga and Knoxville, Tennessee; and Roanoke, Virginia. By the early 1950s, locations had opened at Greensboro, North Carolina and at Pittman Plaza, in Lynchburg, Virginia. Many of these locations were designed by noted Charlotte-based architect Martin Evans Boyer.

The original cafeterias were in busy downtown areas, often near theaters and shopping areas. The early locations were quite opulent (designed in the Art Deco style) and served as sites of numerous local business and political gatherings. During the 1960s and 1970s, as suburban shopping centers opened and downtowns declined, S&W followed the trend by closing its downtown locations. In 1964, 16 locations were in operation. Into the 1990s, the mainstay clientele were the elderly who appreciated the home-style meals at low prices.

In the 1960s, Sherrill was under pressure to desegregate the S&W Cafeteria and serve all people equally, regardless of color. In response to this push, Sherrill also received letters supporting the continued segregation of his restaurants. In June 1963, S&W opened its doors to all customers regardless of race.

== Branch locations ==
=== Washington, D.C. ===
The first Washington, D.C., area location opened downtown in 1934: a 27,000-square-foot (2,500 m^{2}) restaurant in the Washington Building at 1425 G Street, NW, on New York Avenue. It was a regular stop for southern members of Congress, including Sen. Richard Russell (D-GA) and Sen. Clyde Hoey (D-NC). During World War II, the cafeteria served up to 9,000 daily. Because of a severe drop in night trade, it closed in May 1964.

Suburban locations operated at Seven Corners Shopping Center, opening in 1956; Landmark Shopping Center, opening in 1964; and a 215,000-square-foot (20,000 m^{2}) restaurant at Washington Science Center in Rockville, Maryland, opening in 1966. A racial ban at the Seven Corners location was lifted in August 1961, after an African official (the mayor of Dar es Salaam, Tanganyika) was refused service and the State Department intervened with a call to S&W owner Frank Sherrill. This location closed in 1976, when the center was upgraded. Its closing spurred protests from longtime patrons, largely elderly, 1,000 of whom relied daily on the cafeteria for low-cost meals. The location reopened in 1980, at 155 Hillwood Ave., in nearby Falls Church; a new $650,000, 13,000-square-foot (1,200 m^{2}) restaurant seating 400. The Falls Church location operated into the 1990s. The Landmark location featured 30-foot (9.1 m) long, 22-foot (6.7 m) high murals and crystal chandeliers, closed in 1986.

=== Asheville, North Carolina ===
- S And W Cafeteria
- U.S. National Register of Historic Places
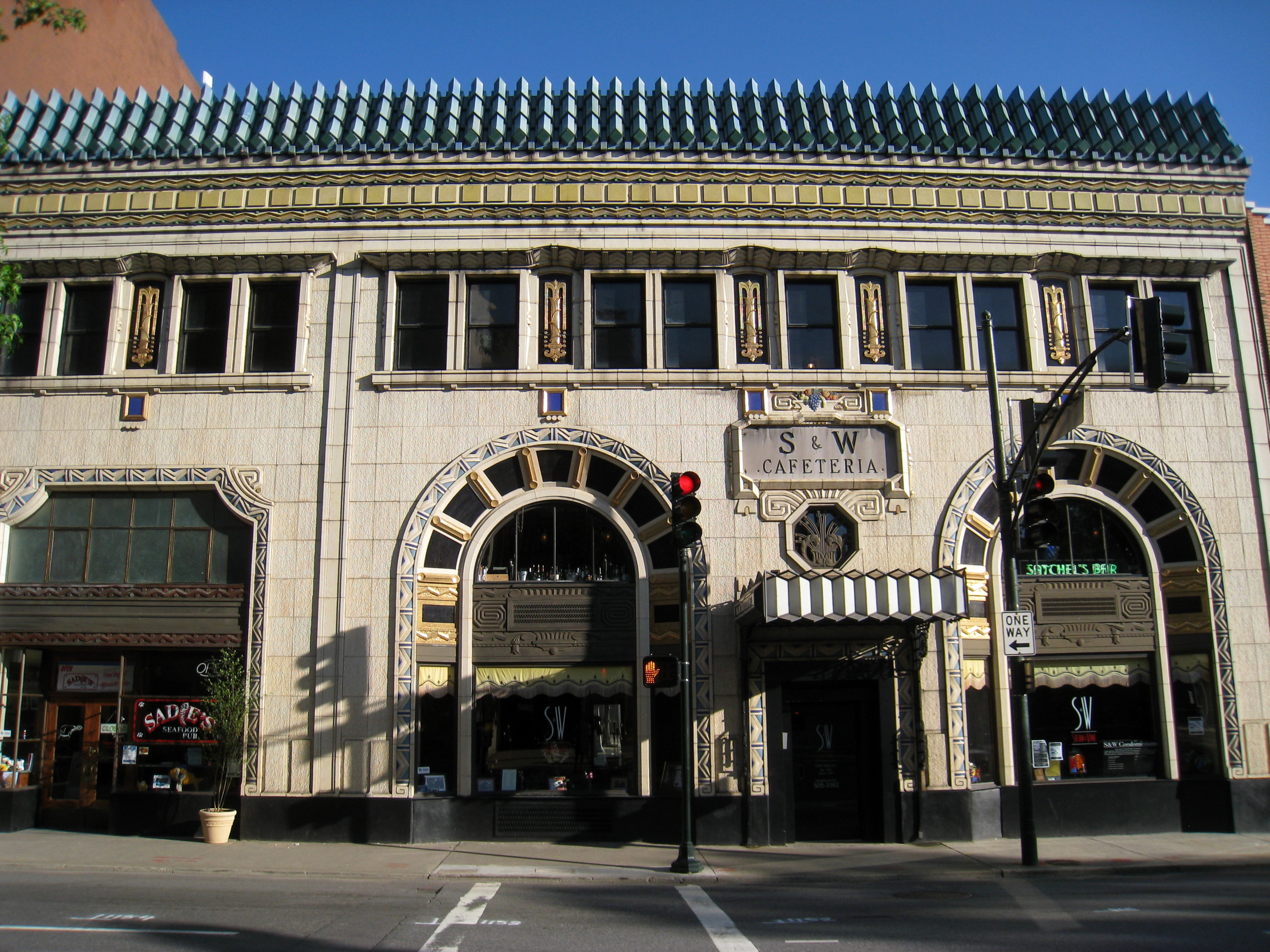
- S&W Cafeteria, Asheville
- Location: Patton Ave., Asheville, North Carolina
- Area: 0 acres (0 ha)
- Built: 1929
- Architects: Ellington, Douglas D.
- Architectural style: Art Deco
- NRHP reference No.: 77000993
- Added to NRHP: March 28, 1977

The downtown Asheville location opened at 60 Patton Avenue in 1929, and closed in 1974. It is in the Art Deco style and was designed by architect Douglas Ellington. In 2007, Steve Moberg purchased and renovated the building and the restaurant S&W Steak and Wine and coffee shop Corner House. The restaurant closed in 2011.

It was added to the National Register of Historic Places in 1977.

=== Charlotte, North Carolina ===
The original S&W operated at 100 W. Trade Street in uptown Charlotte from 1920 until 1970; it was razed in the mid-1980s. Three suburban Charlotte locations operated at Park Road Shopping Center (in 1958, closed ca. 1980), at Charlottetown Mall (in 1959, closed ca. 1980), and at Freedom Village Mall in the 1960s (closed January 1983).

=== Greenville, South Carolina ===
An S&W location opened at Bell Tower Mall on University Ridge (now Greenville County Square, but in the process of being demolished) in 1970, at the front of the mall. It closed in 1979.

=== Knoxville, Tennessee ===
The downtown S&W opened in 1936 and operated at 516-518 South Gay Street until the early 1980s. It is a two-story Art Deco building with a glazed terra cotta exterior and an opulent interior. The area is part of a historic district being actively preserved by the non-profit Knox Heritage. In August 2007, the neighboring Downtown Regal Riviera opened, stimulating redevelopment of the surrounding properties.

The S&W on Gay Street was renovated and officially re-opened for business to the public on October 21, 2009, as the S&W Grand Cafe.

The S&W closed its doors on January 8, 2011. Statement from their Facebook page:

We are taking the opportunity during this slow time of the year to determine the future plan for the S&W Grand in 2011. Effective immediately, we will be closed until further notice. We thank everyone for their support over the past year, and remain hopeful to serve you again in the near future.

=== Roanoke, Virginia ===
The original S&W operated at 412 S. Jefferson Street. In 1964, that location closed and has since been occupied by Davidson's men's store. That store recently underwent a $2 million renovation. The downtown location moved to 16 Church Avenue, SW, in the former Greyhound Bus Terminal. The new two-story location featured Art Deco appointments and made-to-order breakfast for the early downtown crowd. It closed in the 1970s. This location is now the 16 West Marketplace, housing shopping, restaurants, and other businesses.

Richmond, Virginia

There were also two locations in Richmond, Virginia. One was at Willow Lawn Shopping Center, and the other was at Southside Plaza. They closed in the early 1980s.
