= Asheville City Hall =

Historic civic building in North Carolina, US

- U.S. National Register of Historic Places
- U.S. Historic district – Contributing property
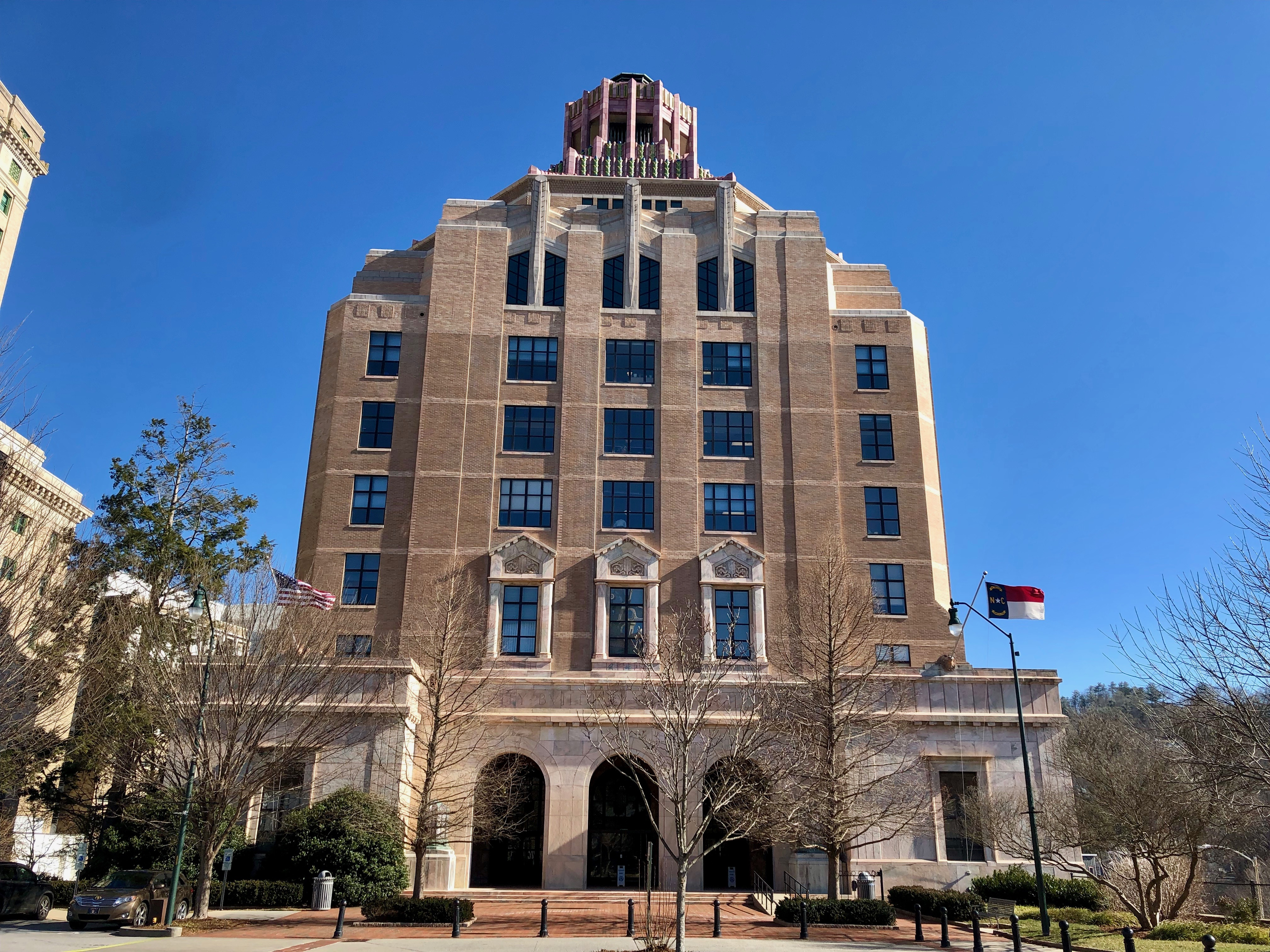
- Asheville's City Hall from Pack Square Park

- Location within North Carolina Location within the United States
- Location: Court Plaza Asheville, North Carolina
- Coordinates: 35°35′44″N 82°32′55″W
- Area: 1 acre (0.40 ha)
- Built: 1926
- Architect: Douglas Ellington
- Architectural style: Art Deco
- NRHP reference No.: 76001307
- Added to NRHP: 1976

Asheville City Hall, is a historic Art Deco brick and stone governmental office building located on Court Plaza in Asheville, North Carolina, United States. It serves as the seat of the government of the City of Asheville. It is located in the Downtown Asheville Historic District and was added to the National Register of Historic Places in 1976. The building's unique shape and colorful exterior have made it an iconic Asheville landmark and a symbol for the city, reflected by the use of its silhouette in the city's seal.

== Current use ==
The building is one of the Art Deco masterpieces of Asheville. It was designed by renowned architect Douglas Ellington, whose other works in the city include Asheville High School and the First Baptist Church of Asheville. It was constructed from 1926 to 1928. While it was intended to be a twin to the new Buncombe County Courthouse, the adjacent courthouse was built in a more conservative and classic style, and much taller than the city hall. A wing connecting them together was planned, but never built. The building still serves the City of Asheville, while the Courthouse has undergone many renovations and expansions.

The City Council Chamber is decorated by five murals by painter Clifford Addams.

== See also ==
- National Register of Historic Places listings in Buncombe County, North Carolina
- List of tallest buildings in Asheville
