= Pack Square Park =

Public square in Asheville, North Carolina

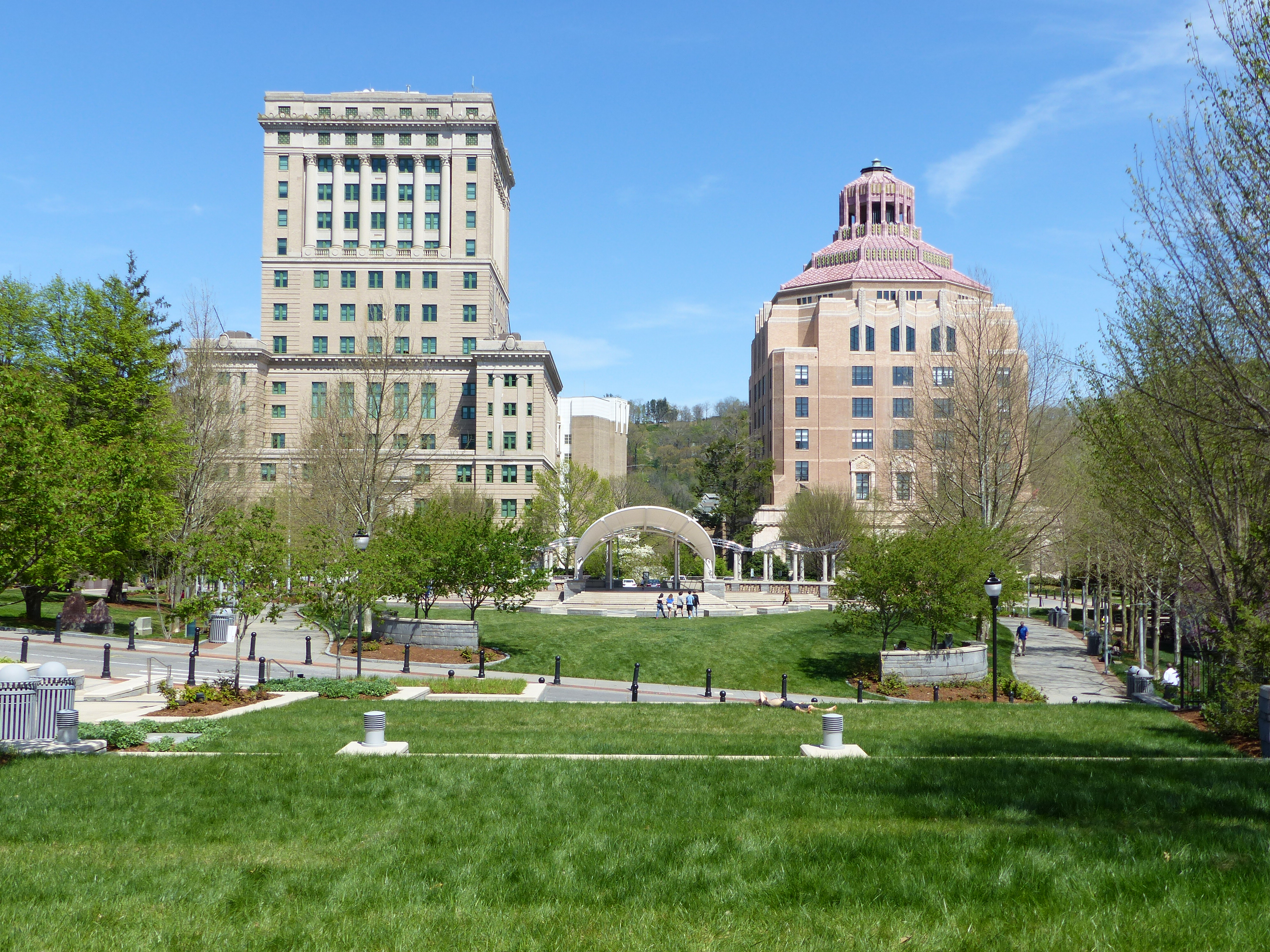
- Asheville City Hall and Buncombe County Courthouse occupy the eastern edge of the park (2009 view)
- Interactive map of Pack Square Park
- Namesake: George W. Pack
- Maintained by: City of Asheville
- Location: Asheville, North Carolina, U.S.
- Postal code: 28801
- Coordinates: 35.5955°N 82.5493°W
- North: College Street
- East: Court Plaza
- South: Marjorie Street
- West: South Spruce Street

Construction
- Completion: 1903 (122 years ago)

Pack Square Park is a public square in Asheville, North Carolina. Situated immediately west of Asheville City Hall and Buncombe County Courthouse and established in 1903, it is bounded by South Spruce Street to the west, College Street to the north, Court Plaza to the east, and Marjorie Street to the south. In 2009, a memorial to Western North Carolina Veterans was installed on the northern side of the square, while a covered stage occupies the eastern side.

The park is named for George W. Pack, who donated the land for its creation in 1901. The earlier courthouse, which occupied the location, was demolished and rebuilt a few yards to the east. The vacated parcel of land was named Pack Square Park in 1903.

In 2009, the park was redesigned under the guidance of Pack Square Conservancy, a non-profit organization. City–County Plaza became Roger McGuire Green and mid-park became Reuter Terrace.

The park should not be confused with Pack Square (or Pack Square Plaza), located around 500 feet (150 m) to the west.

== See also ==
- Hayes and Hopson Building, which overlooks the southwestern corner of the square
