= S & W Cafeteria (Asheville, North Carolina) =

Historic building in North Carolina, US

- U.S. National Register of Historic Places
- U.S. Historic district – Contributing property
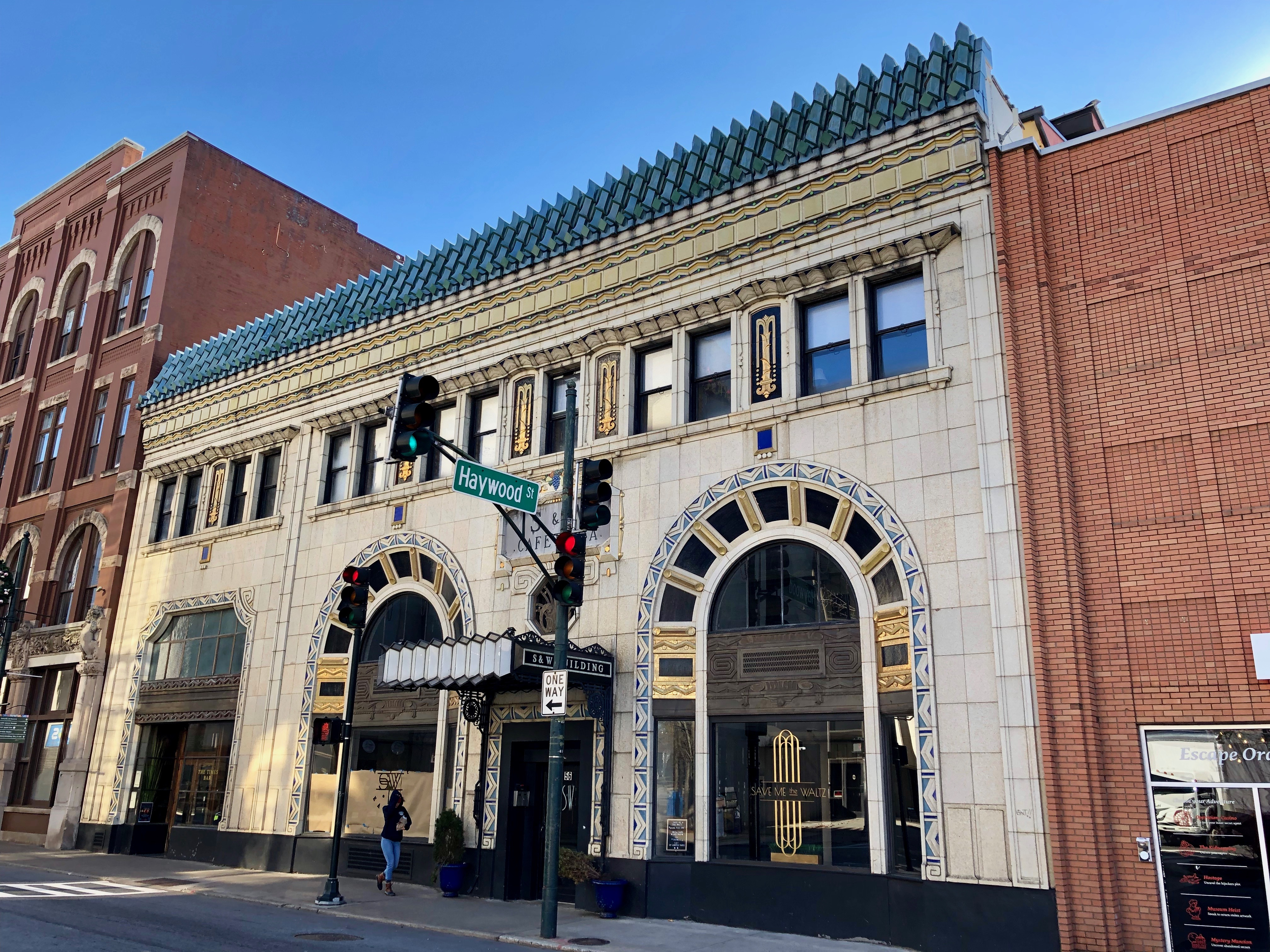
- S & W Cafeteria, January 2019

- Location within North Carolina Location within the United States
- Location: Patton Ave., Asheville, North Carolina
- Coordinates: 35°35′40″N 82°33′14″W
- Built: 1929
- Architects: Ellington, Douglas D.
- Architectural style: Art Deco
- NRHP reference No.: 77000993
- Added to NRHP: March 28, 1977

S & W Cafeteria is a historic S & W Cafeteria building located in the Downtown Asheville Historic District of Asheville, North Carolina, United States. It was designed by the architect Douglas Ellington and built in 1929. A three-story, brick building in the Art Deco style, the facade is sheathed in grey ashlar and features polychrome ornamentation and exotic stylistic motifs. In 1974, S & W Cafeteria moved to the Asheville Mall.

In 2019, renovations began for the historic building to house S & W Market, a food hall and event venue. It opened in June 2021.

The building was listed on the National Register of Historic Places in 1977.
