= Davidson's =

- Industry: clothing
- Founded: 1910
- Headquarters: Roanoke, Virginia
- Products: menswear

Davidson's is a Roanoke, Virginia-based chain of menswear stores. The company was founded in 1910. Its downtown location is at 412 S. Jefferson St., in a former S&W Cafeteria, that it has occupied since 1964. In 2008, the location underwent a $2 million renovation. Other locations are at the Grand Pavilion in Roanoke County across from the Tanglewood Mall, and Westlake Plaza, at Smith Mountain Lake, Hardy, Virginia.
