= Hayes and Hopson Building =

Building in Asheville, North Carolina, United States

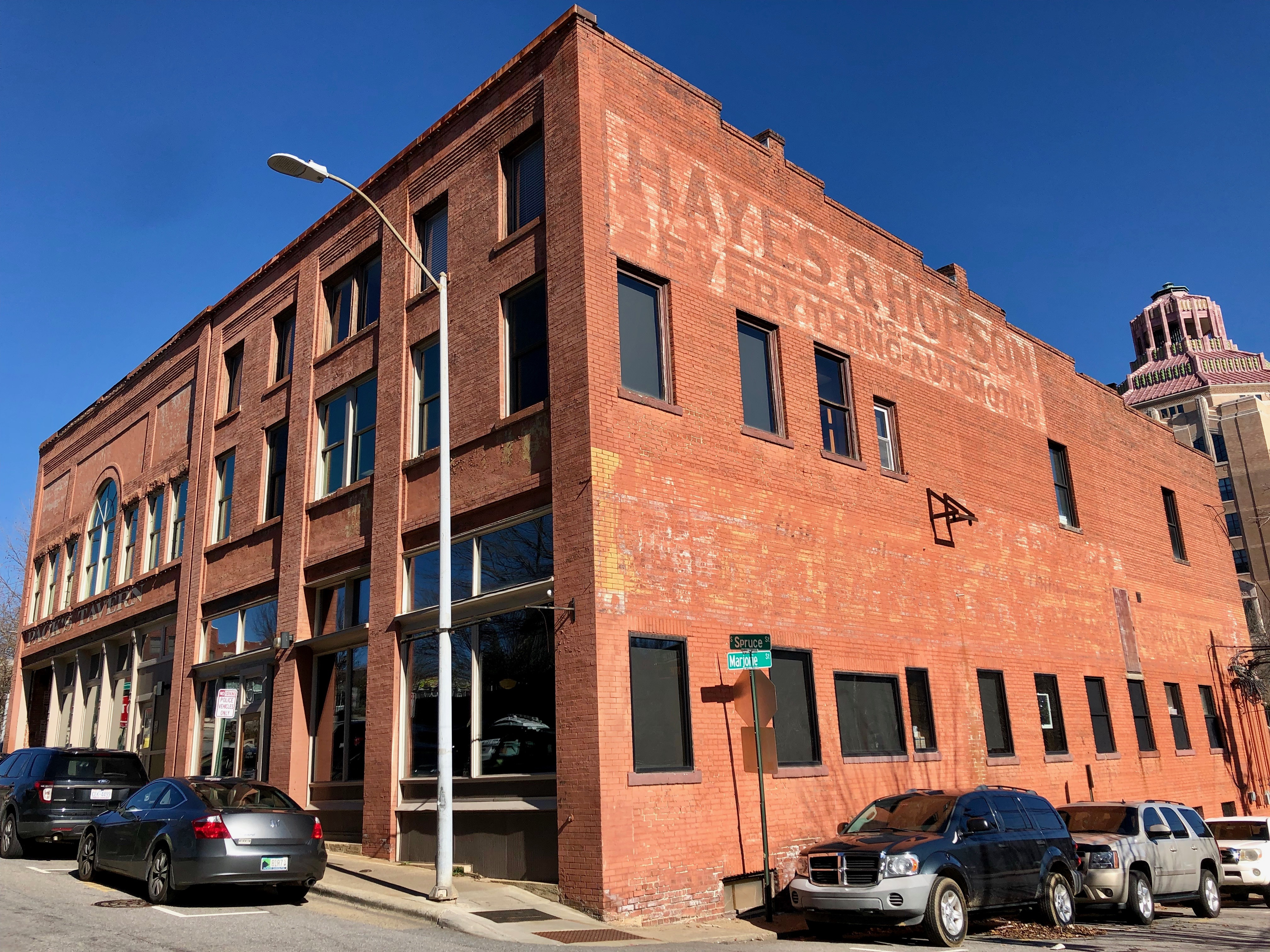
- The southern end of the building in 2019, viewed from the intersection of South Spruce Street and Marjorie Street
- Interactive map of the Hayes and Hopson Building area
- Former names: Westall Building (1907–1942)

General information
- Location: 20–22 South Spruce Street, Asheville, North Carolina, United States
- Coordinates: 35.5951°N 82.5496°W
- Construction started: 1907 (119 years ago)

Technical details
- Floor count: 3

The Hayes and Hopson Building (originally the Westall Building) is a historic three-story structure on South Spruce Street in Asheville, North Carolina. Built in 1907 and expanded in 1912, the building overlooks Pack Square Park. It became an important meeting point during Prohibition, when liquor was exchanged beneath the building via a network of tunnels.

Pack's Tavern occupies the location today.

== History ==
The original (southern) end of the building was completed in 1907 to house a local lumber supply company. Demand quickly grew, and five years later an addition was made on the building's northern side, at today's Court Plaza intersection.

In 1920, after the Prohibition alcohol ban began, a distribution center for moonshine was established in the building's basement. A tunnel was built under Eagle Street, a few yards to the south, to transport the product under cover, an enterprise which lasted over a decade.

After Prohibition ended in 1933, the building became known as the Hayes and Hopson Building in 1942, owned by Max Hayes (1896–1960) and John S. Hopson (1885–1944). They had established Hayes and Hopson Inc., an automotive parts and supply company, in 1923.

The building was purchased by Dr. Wallace N. Hyde and Jack Bryant in 1978. It was Bill Stanley's barbecue restaurant in the 1980s. Stanley later became Buncombe County commissioner, but was removed from office in 2019 after being accused of corruption. His name was also removed from the Family Justice Center on Woodfin Street. Stanley died the following year, aged 91.

There were plans to demolish the building in 2008, to be replaced by a nine-story condominium. The developer, Stewart Coleman, changed his mind after the condominium market "disappeared'; he instead converted the building into today's tavern. Coleman died in 2012, aged 63, after a short illness.

Between 2009 and 2010, extensive renovations were undertaken on the building, undoing several alterations which had occurred when it was used as county offices. The changes returned the building—especially its facade—to closer to its original appearance. New windows were added to the first and second stories on the northern end of the building.

In 2010, the building became the restaurant Pack's Tavern.

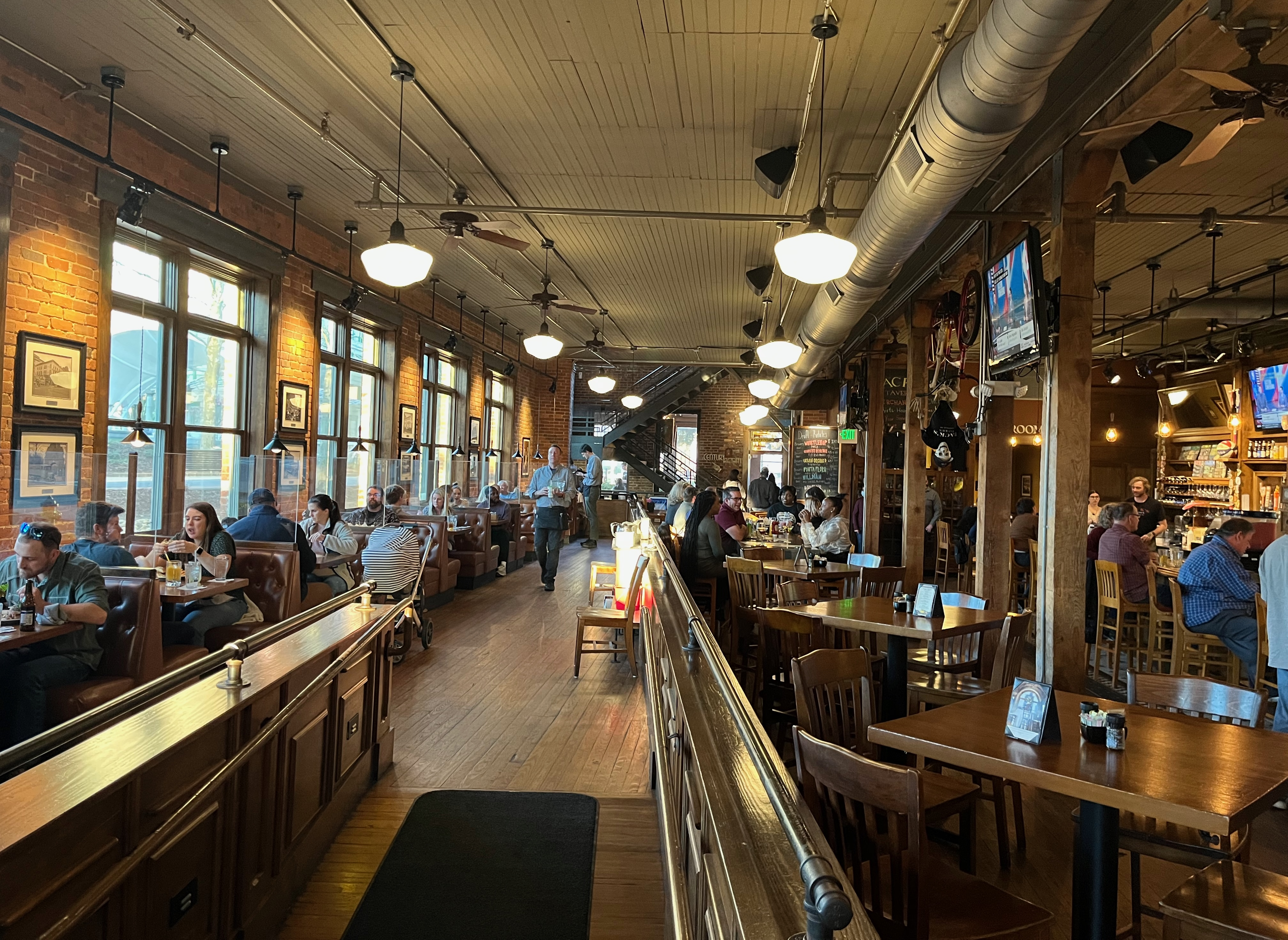
The interior of the northern end of the building

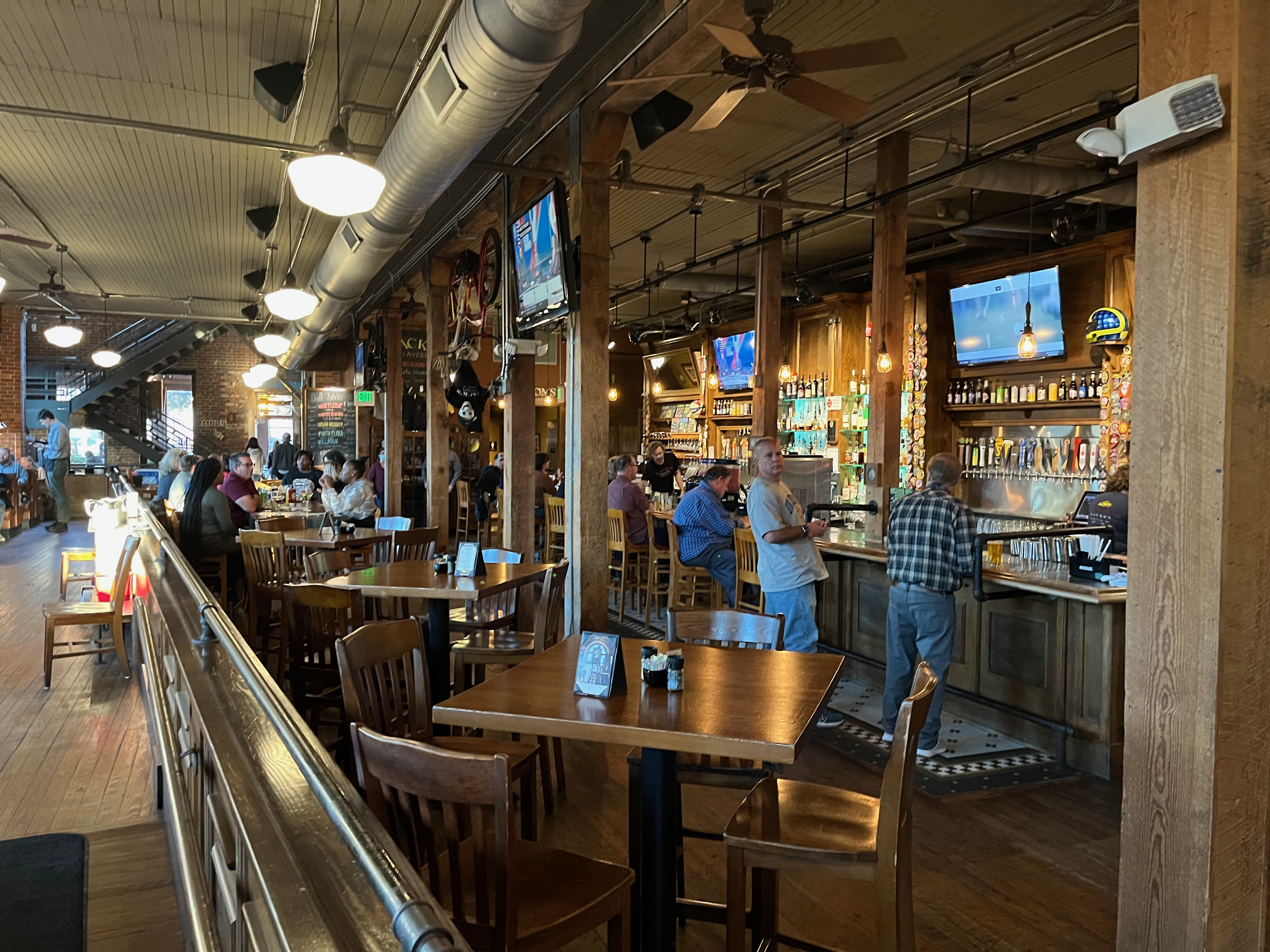
This end is home to Pack's Tavern's bar
