= Douglas Ellington House =

Historic house in North Carolina, United States

- U.S. National Register of Historic Places
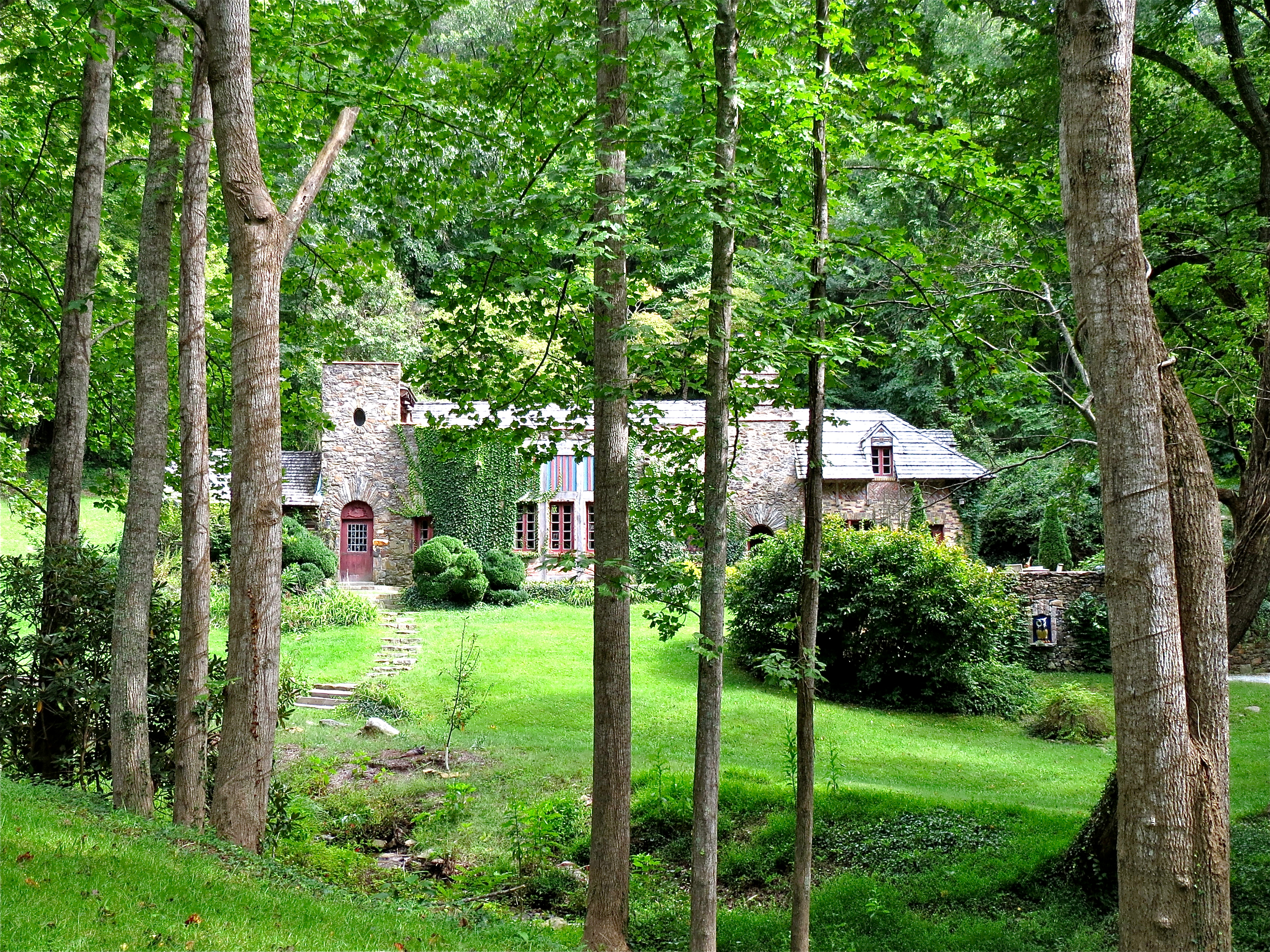

- Location within North Carolina Location within the United States
- Location: 583 Chunns Cove Rd., Asheville, North Carolina
- Coordinates: 35°37′7″N 82°31′24″W
- Area: 8 acres (3.2 ha)
- Built: 1926
- Architect: Ellington, Douglas
- Architectural style: Cottage; Castle style
- NRHP reference No.: 86002881
- Added to NRHP: October 5, 2021

Douglas Ellington House is a historic home located at Asheville, Buncombe County, North Carolina. It was built in 1926 by architect Douglas Ellington, and is an eclectic stone and brick cottage set into its terraced, hillside site. It consists of a two-bay, 1 1/2-story brick "cottage" under a broad-eaved, wood shingled hip roof; a five-bay, uncoursed stone central block; and a traditional, single-room log cabin, said to have been on the property when Ellington's brother, Kenneth Ellington, bought it. They thought it to be over 100 years old.

It was listed on the National Register of Historic Places in 1986.

== Gallery ==
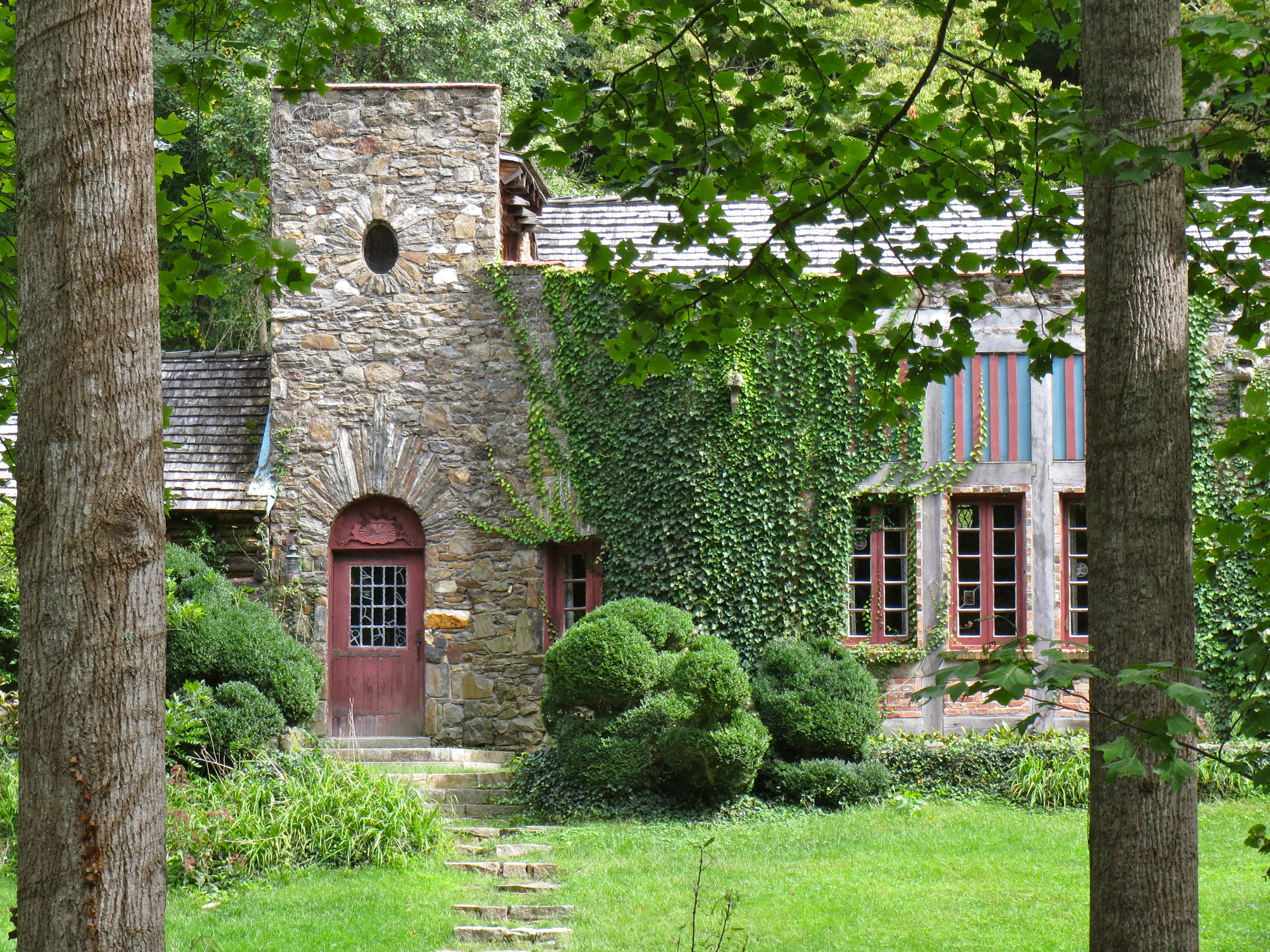
A closer view of the front of the house

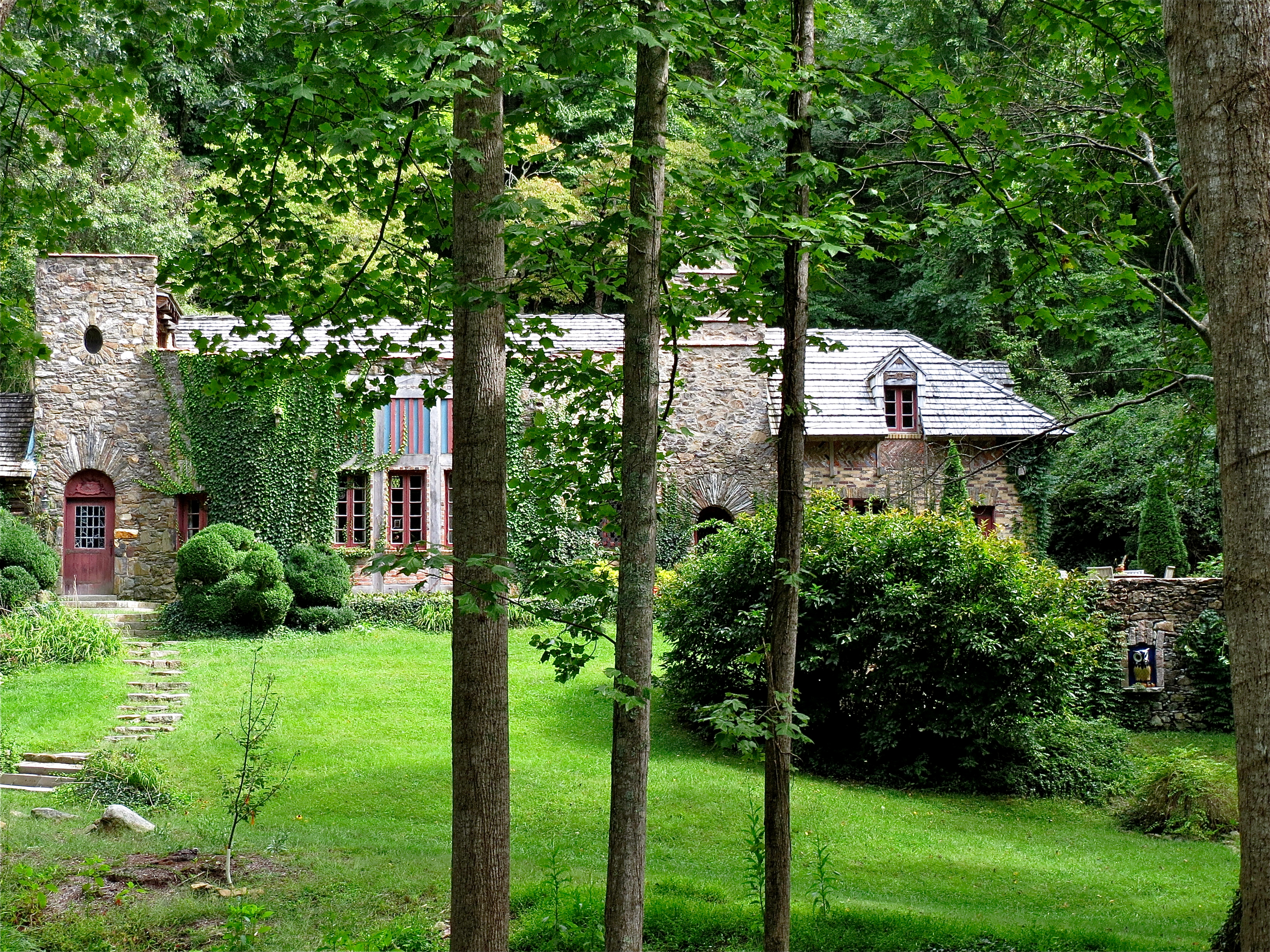
Another view of the house
