= Douglas Ellington =

American architect

Douglas Dobell Ellington
- Born: June 26, 1886; Clayton, North Carolina
- Died: August 27, 1960 (aged 74); Asheville, North Carolina
- Education: Drexel Institute, University of Pennsylvania, École des Beaux-Arts
- Occupation: Architect
- Buildings: S&W Cafeteria, Asheville City Hall, First Baptist Church of Asheville, Asheville High School

Douglas Dobell Ellington (26 June 1886 – 27 August 1960) was an American architect who is noted for his work in the Art Deco style.

== Biography ==
Ellington studied architecture at the Drexel Institute in Philadelphia, the University of Pennsylvania, and the École des Beaux-Arts in Paris. Ellington was the first American to win the Rougevin prize.

After returning from France, he worked as a professor of architecture at Columbia University and then the Carnegie Institute of Technology. During World War I, Ellington worked with the United States Navy, supervising the design of camouflage for ships. Ellington subsequently returned to Pittsburgh where he opened a private architectural practice. In 1929, he designed the S&W Cafeteria location at 60 Patton Avenue in Asheville. While living in Asheville, he also designed notable buildings of the art deco era: Asheville City Hall, First Baptist Church of Asheville, and Asheville High School. During World War II, Ellington designed a housing project in Charleston, South Carolina, which was meant as temporary housing; the Ashley Homes project was constructed on leased land and were expected to be torn down at the end of the war.

He was also the architect for the North Charleston Methodist Church in North Charleston, South Carolina in 1954 and Holmes Avenue Baptist Church in 1958. In 1927, Ellington designed the Sylvan Theatre, now part of the Downtown Sylva Historic District in Sylva, North Carolina.

Ellington died on August 27, 1960, at his self-designed and built summer home, known as the Douglas Ellington House, in Asheville, North Carolina.

== Gallery ==
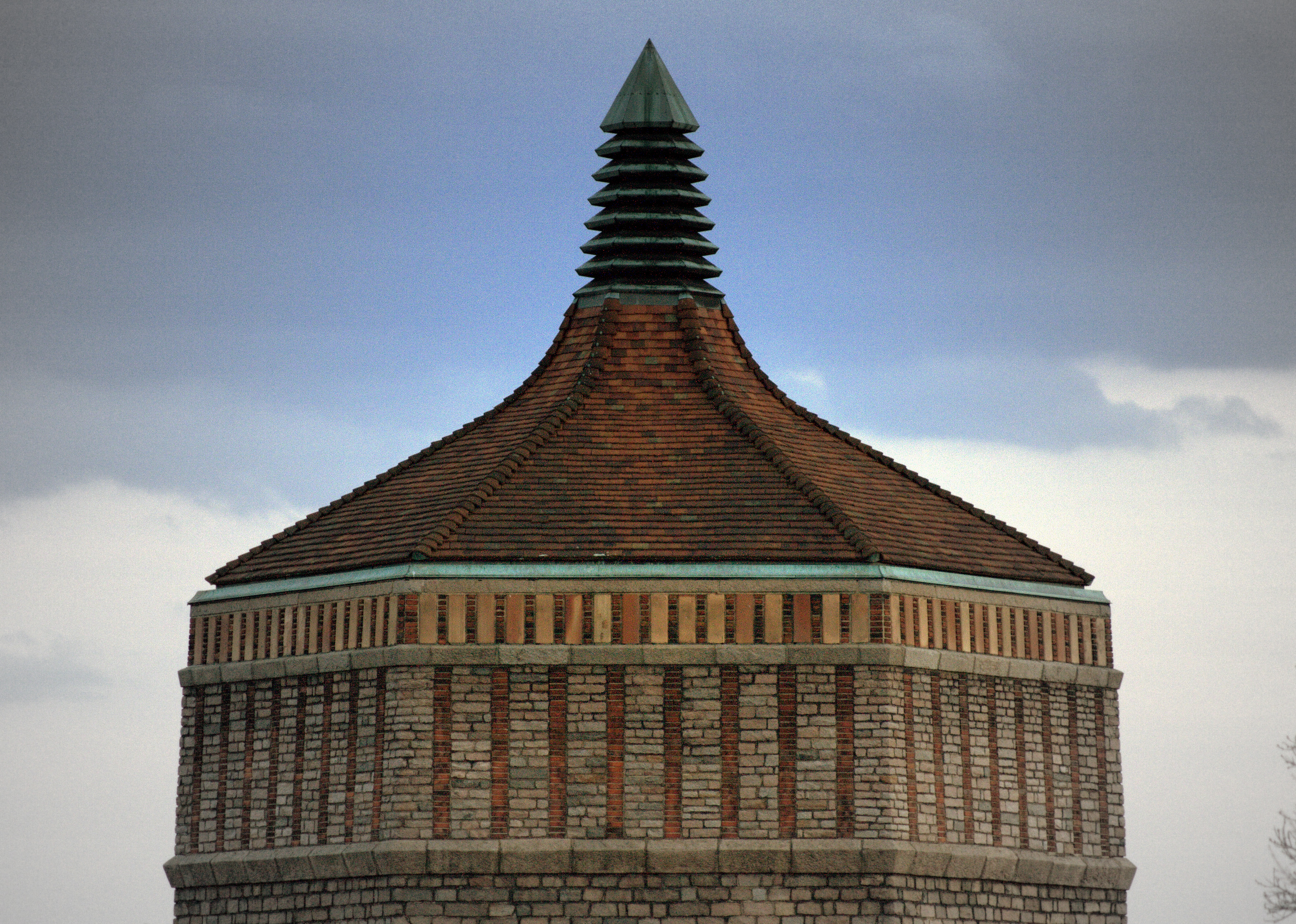
Top of the Asheville High School rotunda, designed by Douglas Ellington in 1929.

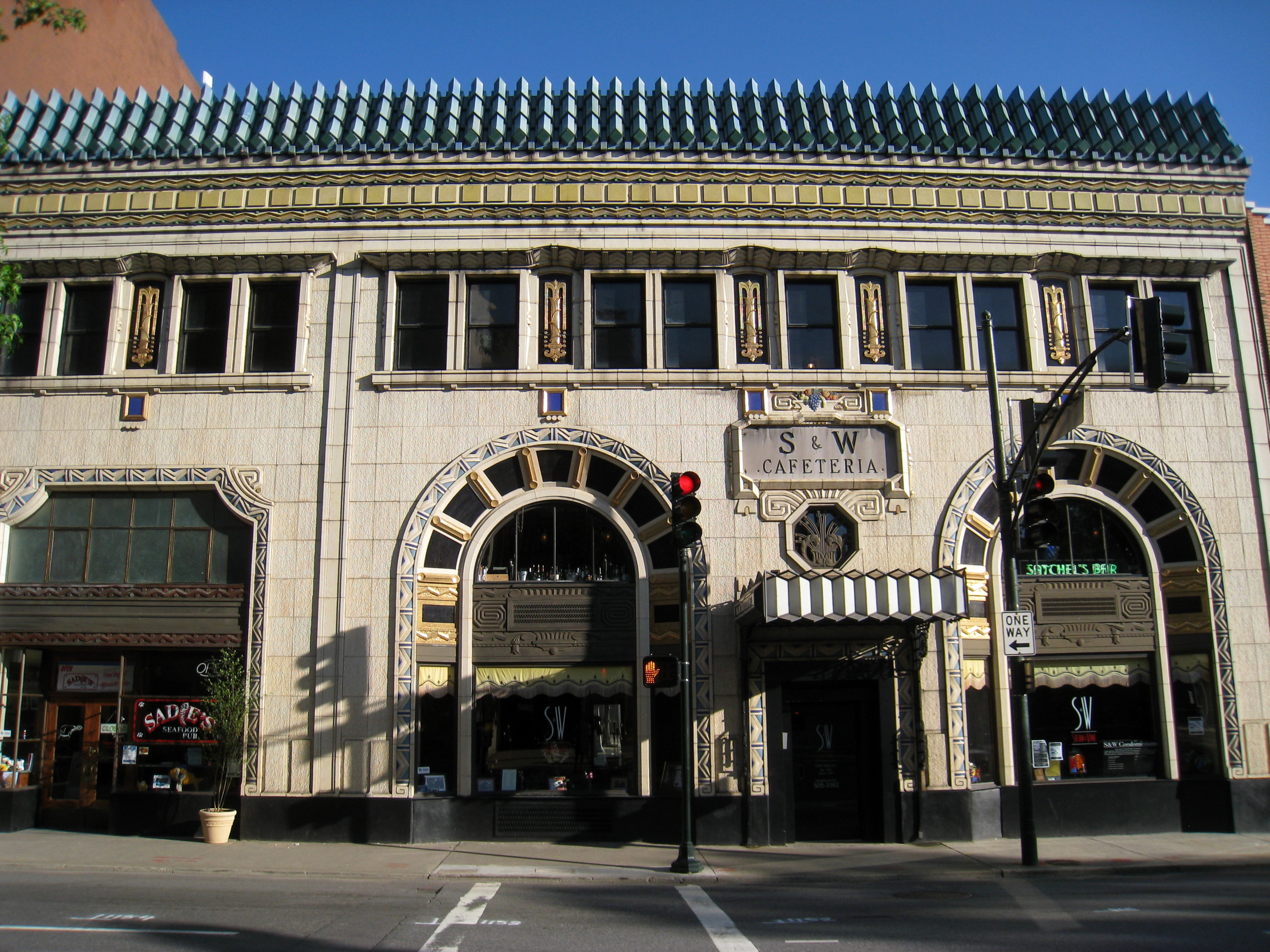
S & W Cafeteria, front facade.

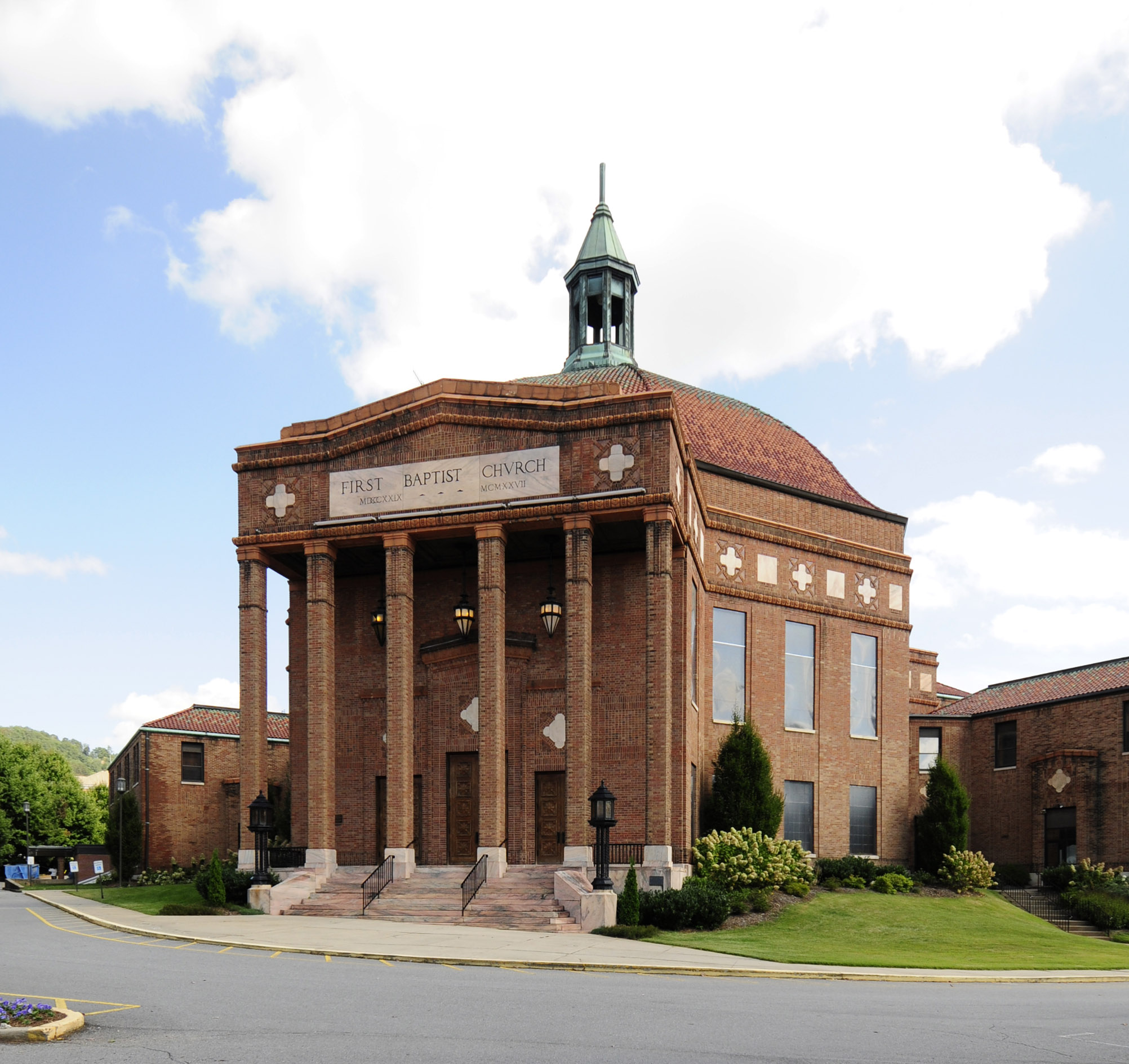
First Baptist Church, Asheville.
