= Asheville Mall =

Regional mall in Asheville, North Carolina

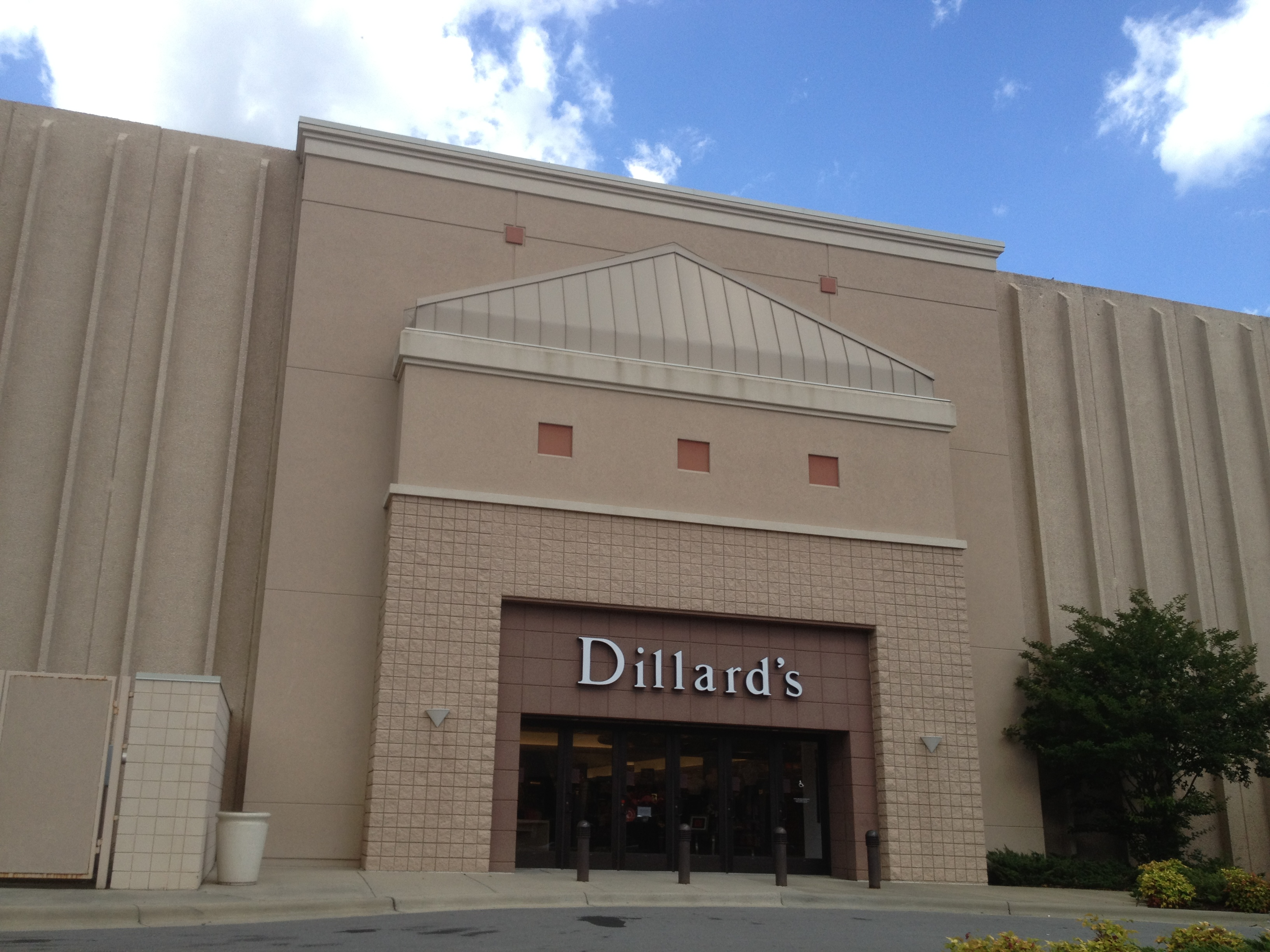
- Exterior of Dillards at Asheville Mall, May 2012
- Location: Asheville, North Carolina, United States
- Coordinates: 35.58056°N 82.526556°W
- Address: 3 South Tunnel Road
- Opened: November 23, 1973; 52 years ago
- Developer: R. L. Coleman
- Owner: Kohan Retail Investment Group; Summit Properties USA
- Num. of stores: 99
- Num. of anchor tenants: 5 (3 open, 1 vacant, 1 coming soon)
- Floor area: 974,399 sq ft (90,524.6 m^{2}). (GLA)
- Floors: 1 (2 in anchors and Barnes & Noble)
- Website: asheville-mall.com

Asheville Mall is a regional mall in Asheville, North Carolina.

Asheville Mall is located off Interstate 240 in eastern Asheville. It is predominantly a one-story mall. Its anchors are Belk and two Dillard's locations. A former anchor store, Sears, closed in July 2018. The space still sits vacant as of 2026. In May 2025, JCPenney closed its store and the former JCPenney is currently under development to become an emergency operations center for a hospital. It has 132 stores and is the largest mall in Western North Carolina. It also dominates the area's retail.

== History ==
Asheville Mall was developed by R. L. Coleman and Company opening in stages beginning with Sears on February 3, 1972 and the rest of the shopping center opening November 23, 1973. The mall's development was met with resistance from city officials and nearby property owners. During site grading a neighbor pulled a shotgun and threatened a bulldozer operator with it. During the construction's final phase a helicopter crashed into roof and had to be removed with a crane. The copter was being used to move air conditioning units onto the roof at the time of the crash. The center's completion is a testament to the negotiation skill and perseverance on Mr. Coleman's part. The original anchors were The Bon Marche, Belk, and Sears. The S & W Cafeteria moved to the Mall from downtown Asheville in 1974. Shortly after the opening, an Ivey's was added in the mid-1970s, along with a minor addition to the mall. In 1989, JCPenney joined the mall, adding onto a wing that had been added earlier in the decade. Montgomery Ward opened in 1994 in the space that housed The Bon Marche, later regional chains Meyers-Arnold and Uptons. After Dillard's purchased Ivey's in the early 1990s, that store was converted to a Dillard's. Belk expanded its store and added a second level in 2000. In the same year the mall added a Food Court.

Chick-fil-A opened the first store in the region in the mid-eighties. This was the only mall location in company history open on Sundays due to mall rules until 1997 when the lease was renegotiated.

The mall also expanded a wing from JCPenney to Belk adding 30 stores. The Coleman family sold the mall in 1997. After Montgomery Ward's closure in 2000, its store became Dillard's Men's, Children's, and Home, with the original Dillard's becoming a women's store.

In 2015, Sears Holdings spun off 235 of its properties, including the Sears at Asheville Mall, into Seritage Growth Properties. Sears closed this location in July 2018 and is planned to be redeveloped into new apartments.

On June 30, 2020, an SEC filing by owner CBL Properties listed Asheville Mall among properties that would likely be foreclosed upon.

September 2024, Summit Properties USA acquired ownership of the mall and assumed management responsibilities.

JCPenney closed on May 25, 2025. In late 2025, it was announced that, development had begun on potentially converting the former JCPenney into an emergency center. Buncombe County officials are now considering purchasing the site, turning it into the county's first standalone emergency operations center and the first emergency operations center within a mall. The six-acre former JCPenney location was chosen because of its central location in the county and its ability to house multiple different agencies. The proposed location will serve as the year-round home for the Emergency Services Department, providing a larger footprint for training, preparedness, and disaster response planning and operations. It is expected to cost $5 million to purchase the JCPenney anchor building.
