= First Baptist Church (Asheville, North Carolina) =

Historic church in North Carolina, United States

- U.S. National Register of Historic Places
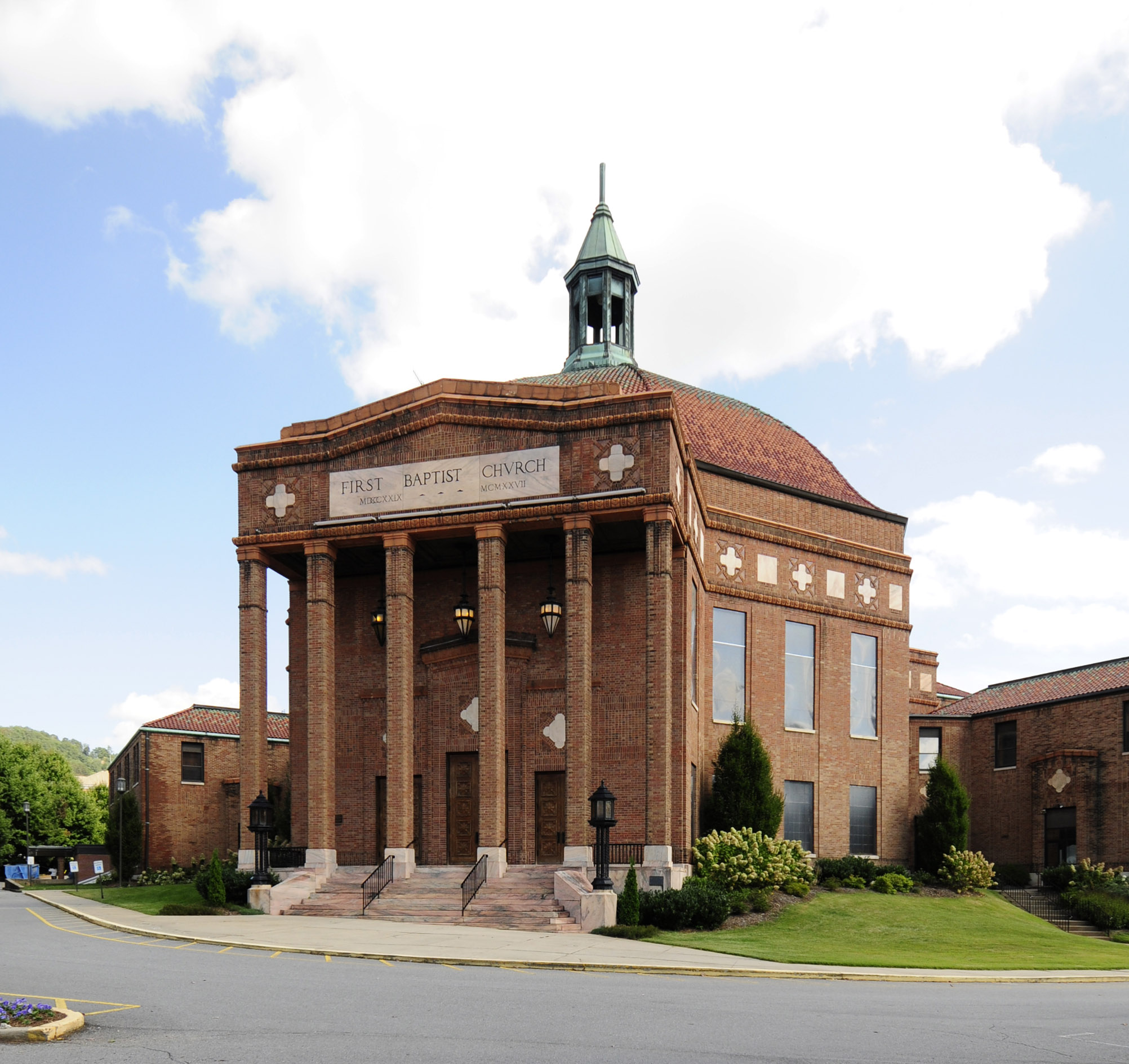
- First Baptist Church, September 2012

- Location within North Carolina Location within the United States
- Location: Oak and Woodfin Sts., Asheville, North Carolina
- Coordinates: 35°35′57″N 82°32′52″W
- Area: 2 acres (0.81 ha)
- Built: 1925-1927
- Built by: Miller Engineering Corp.
- Architect: Douglas D. Ellington
- Architectural style: Beax-Arts, Art Deco
- NRHP reference No.: 76001308
- Added to NRHP: July 13, 1976

First Baptist Church is a historic Baptist church located in Asheville, North Carolina, United States.

== Congregation ==
The First Baptist Church states it contributes to the Cooperative Baptist Fellowship, itself a partner of the National Baptist Convention of America, as well as the Alliance of Baptists, a progressive Baptist denomination. Since 2019, the First Baptist Church has described itself as an inclusive church with regard to gender and sexual orientation.

== Building ==
=== History ===
The church's congregation was believed to have first formed in 1829, dedicating their first church building in 1832. That building had to be sold in 1850 due to financial problems, and for the next ten years the Baptists met in the Buncombe County Courthouse. A new church structure was completed and dedicated in 1871.

The membership of the Baptist congregation grew rapidly during the 1880s, and the group needed more space. In 1891 a new church building was constructed and the 1871 building was sold to a Jewish congregation who renamed it Temple Beth-ha Tephila. The Baptist congregation continued to grow, and by the 1920s it became clear that a larger space would be needed.

Douglas Ellington, an architect who lived near Asheville, was hired to design the present structure, which was built between 1925 and 1927. When the church was completed it was capable of seating 2,000 members, with additional rooms capable of seating 3,000 more. While many were initially skeptical that this capacity would be reached, the church's membership reached 2,720, making it Asheville's largest congregation.

The church building was added to the National Register of Historic Places in 1976.

=== Architecture ===
==== Exterior ====
The church is a four-story, domed, polygonal brick building with a Beaux-Arts form and Art Deco details.

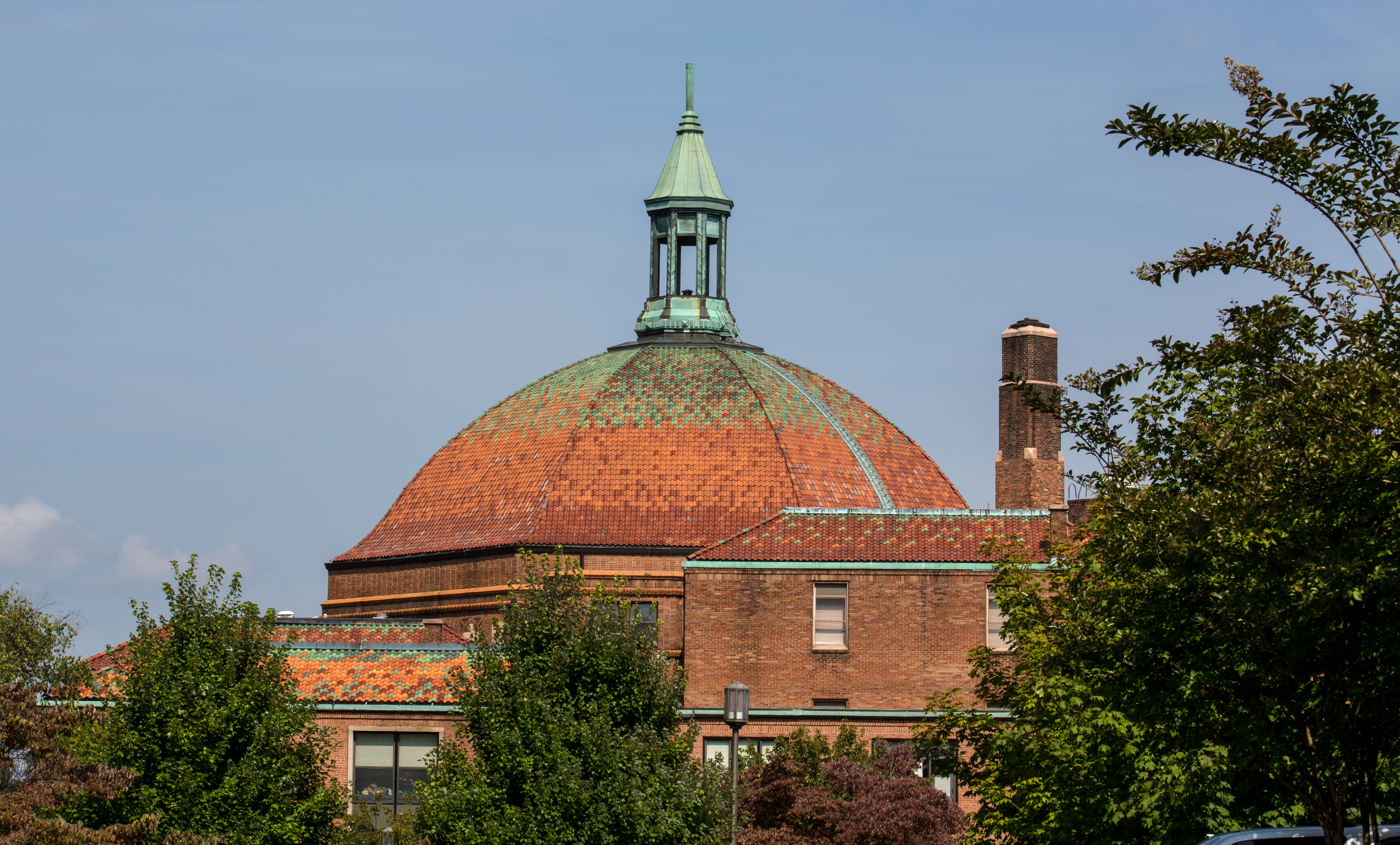
The church's dome, with graduated Ludowici tiles

The front facade features a colossal hectastyle portico and the building's walls are covered with pressed brick laid in a mechanical bond. A monumental triple entrance fronts the building, with a tall central door flanked by two doors at 3/4 its size. Each door is beneath a Greek cross with polygonal apses framed by headers laid in a diamond pattern.

Above the portico's cornice the building is crowned by a massive dome spanning the building's 90 foot diameter, inspired by that of the Florence Cathedral. The dome is covered in Ludowici roof tiles arranged in a graduated color scheme, transitioning from darker reds at the roof's base to a bright shade of green near the apex.

==== Interior ====
Churchgoers enter the building through a large vestibule. The vestibule's southern wall has matching closed-string half-turn staircases with winders that create a spiral effect. The stair has steps made of marble and rounded handrails that terminate in a spiral shape. Another triple doorway bridges the vestibule and auditorium of the church.

The auditorium is a large open space that fills the main bulk of the church building. It has five aisles and four blocks of curved chestnut seats. Balconies, supported partially by posts, line the church's polygonal walls along the rear of the room.

The church underwent extensive renovations in 1955 which altered the color scheme and added panels to conceal television facilities. Additional Art Deco detailing and designs were added in what was believed to be the style of Ellington.

=== Other uses ===
Since 2024, the Asheville Symphony Orchestra has used the First Baptist Church for the majority of their performances. The church seats 900 for orchestral performances, and its acoustics have been spoken of favorably.
