= St. Mary's Episcopal Church (Asheville, North Carolina) =

Historic church in North Carolina, United States

- St. Mary's Church
- U.S. National Register of Historic Places
- U.S. Historic district – Contributing property
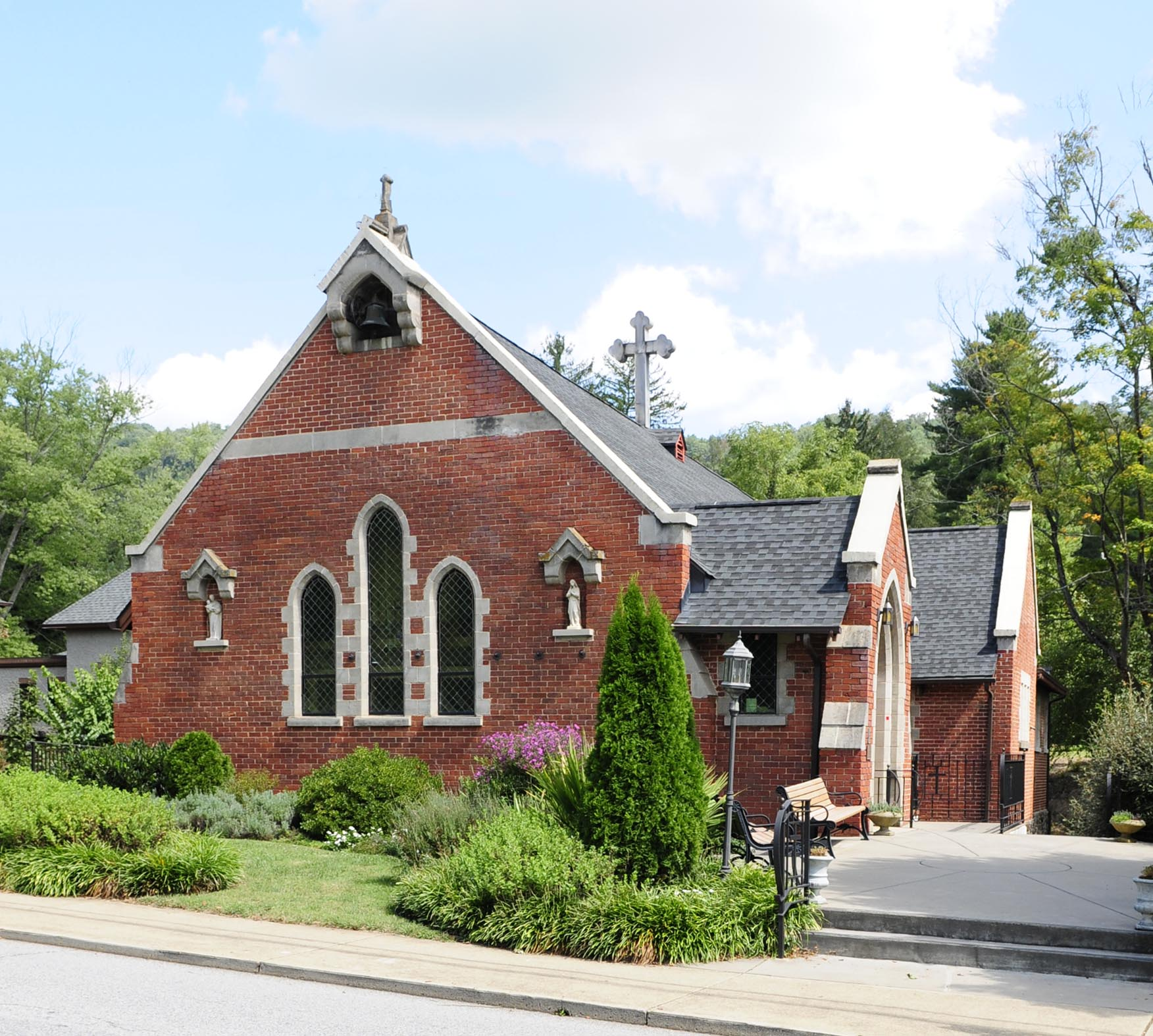

- Location within North Carolina Location within the United States
- Location: 337 Charlotte St., Asheville, North Carolina
- Coordinates: 35°36′39.47″N 82°32′42.13″W
- Built: 1914
- Architect: Smith, Richard S.; Beadle, Chauncey
- Architectural style: Late Gothic Revival
- NRHP reference No.: 94001476
- Added to NRHP: December 23, 1994

St. Mary's Episcopal Church is an Anglo-Catholic Episcopal parish in Asheville, North Carolina, United States, in the Episcopal Diocese of Western North Carolina.

The church reported 188 members in 2016 and 97 members in 2023; no membership statistics were reported in 2024 parochial reports. Plate and pledge income reported for the congregation in 2024 was $158,364 with average Sunday attendance (ASA) of 58 persons.

Its historic redbrick Gothic Revival church was designed by Richard Sharp Smith and Chauncey Beadle and built in 1914. It was listed on the U.S. National Register of Historic Places in 1994. It is located in the Proximity Park Historic District.
