= Dorland Memorial Presbyterian Church =

Historic church in North Carolina, United States

- U.S. National Register of Historic Places
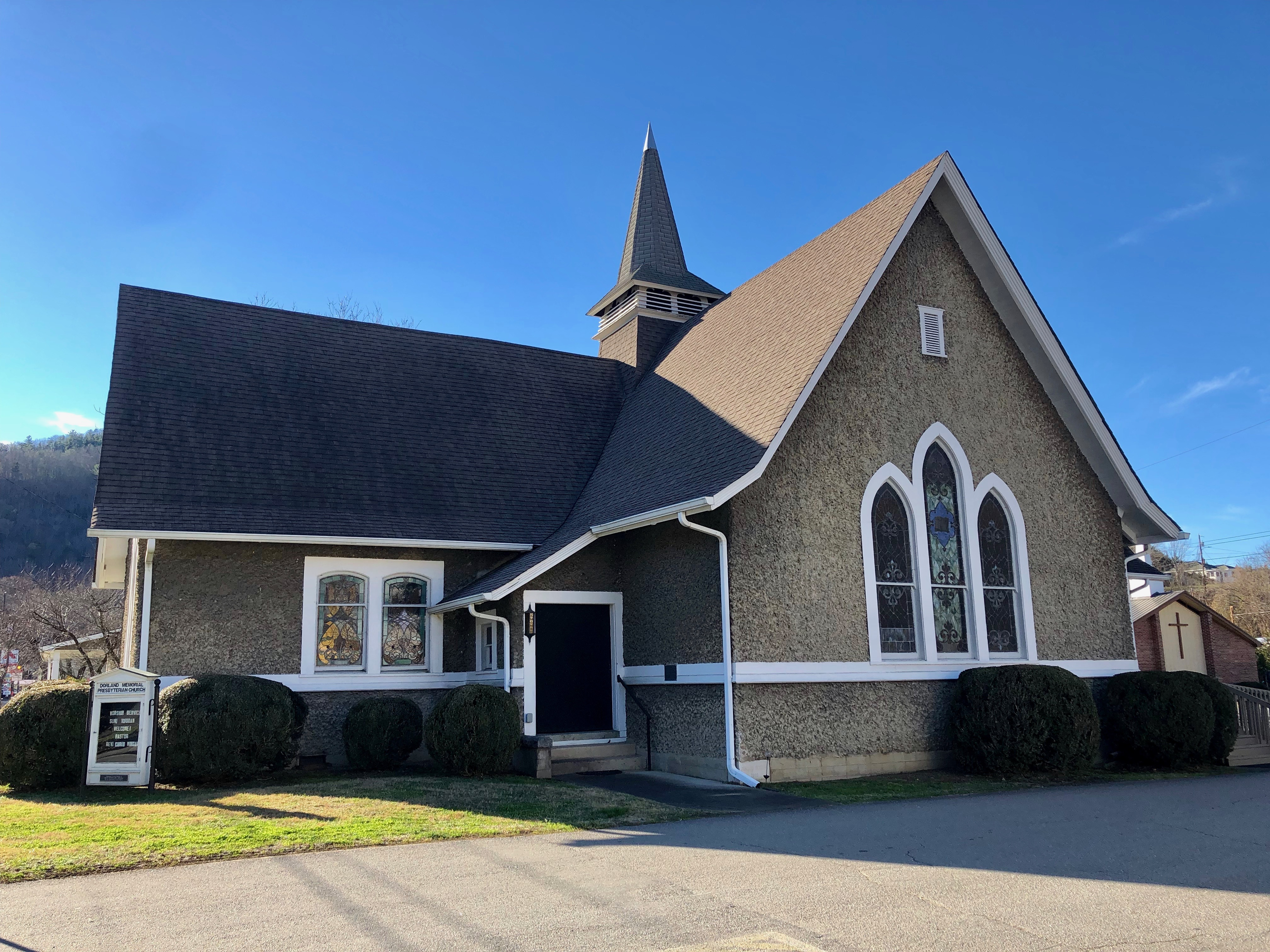
- Dorland Memorial Presbyterian Church, January 2019

- Location within North Carolina Location within the United States
- Location: Bridge St. at Meadow Ln., Hot Springs, North Carolina
- Coordinates: 35°53′32″N 82°49′43″W
- Area: 0.3 acres (0.12 ha)
- Built: 1900
- Built by: Goforth, Zeke
- Architect: Smith, Richard Sharp
- NRHP reference No.: 86001907
- Added to NRHP: July 24, 1986

Dorland Memorial Presbyterian Church is historic Presbyterian church located on Bridge Street at Meadow Lane in Hot Springs, Madison County, North Carolina. It was designed by architect Richard Sharp Smith and built in 1900. It is a cruciform plan church with a splayed, gable roof, pebbledash exterior, and Gothic windows. Atop the roof is a four sided belfry surmounted by an octagonal steeple.

It was added to the National Register of Historic Places in 1986.
