= Mrs. Minnie Alexander Cottage =

Historic house in North Carolina, United States

- U.S. National Register of Historic Places
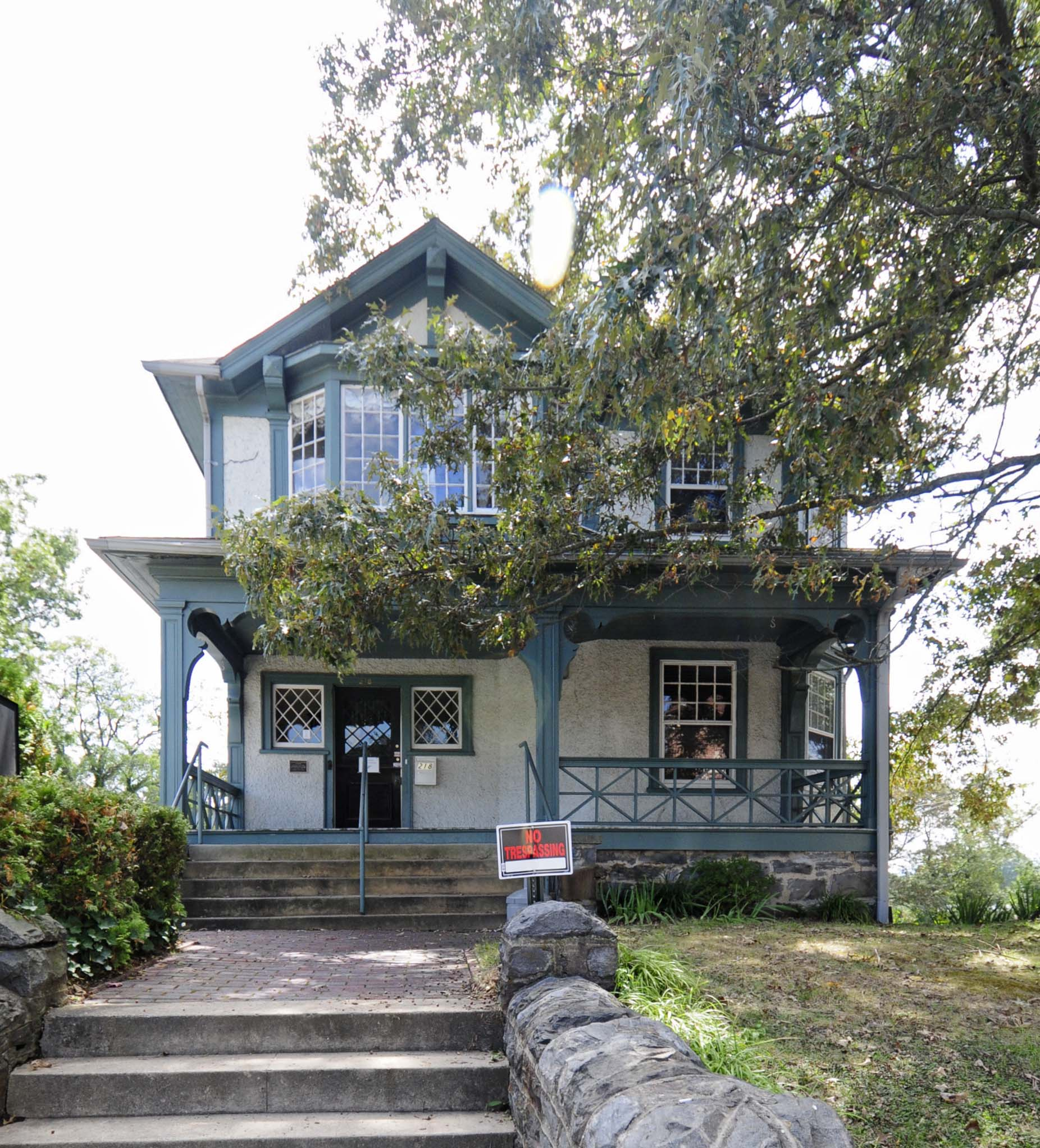
- Mrs. Minnie Alexander Cottage, September 2012

- Location within North Carolina Location within the United States
- Location: 218 Patton Ave., Asheville, North Carolina
- Coordinates: 35°35′34″N 82°33′40″W
- Area: 0.1 acres (0.040 ha)
- Built: c. 1905
- Architect: Smith, Richard Sharp
- Architectural style: Old English Vernacular
- NRHP reference No.: 89002135
- Added to NRHP: December 21, 1989

Mrs. Minnie Alexander Cottage is a historic home located at Asheville, Buncombe County, North Carolina. It was designed by Richard Sharp Smith and built about 1905. It is a two-story, rectangular frame dwelling with a number of projecting bays. The exterior walls are plastered with a roughcast concrete aggregate. It has a hip roof with deep overhanging eaves and brackets. The house has been converted to accommodate offices.

It was listed on the National Register of Historic Places in 1989.
