= Biltmore Village Cottages =

Historic houses in North Carolina, United States

- U.S. National Register of Historic Places
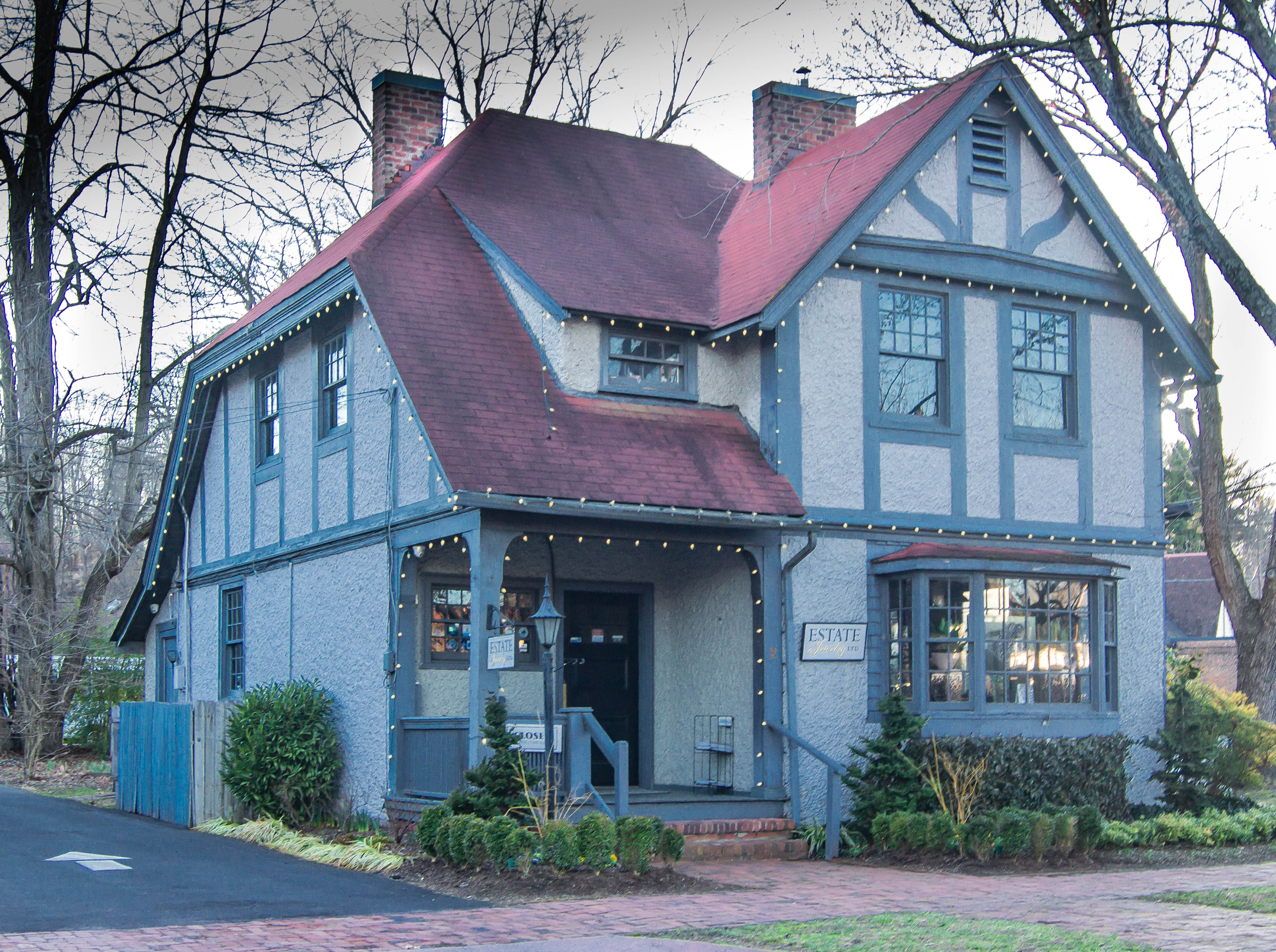

- Location within North Carolina Location within the United States
- Location: 18 Angle St. and 75 Hendersonville Rd., Asheville, North Carolina
- Coordinates: 35°33′58″N 82°32′38″W
- Area: less than one acre
- Built: c. 1900
- Architect: Smith, Richard Sharp
- MPS: Biltmore Village MRA
- NRHP reference No.: 79001672
- Added to NRHP: November 15, 1979

Biltmore Village Cottages are two historic homes formerly located at Biltmore Village, Asheville, Buncombe County, North Carolina. They were designed by Richard Sharp Smith and built about 1900. The dwellings are pebbledash finished half-timbered cottages. They were moved outside the district in August 1983.

It was listed on the National Register of Historic Places in 1979.

== See also ==
- Biltmore Village Cottage District
- Biltmore Village Commercial Buildings
- Biltmore Shoe Store
