= Biltmore Shoe Store =

- U.S. National Register of Historic Places
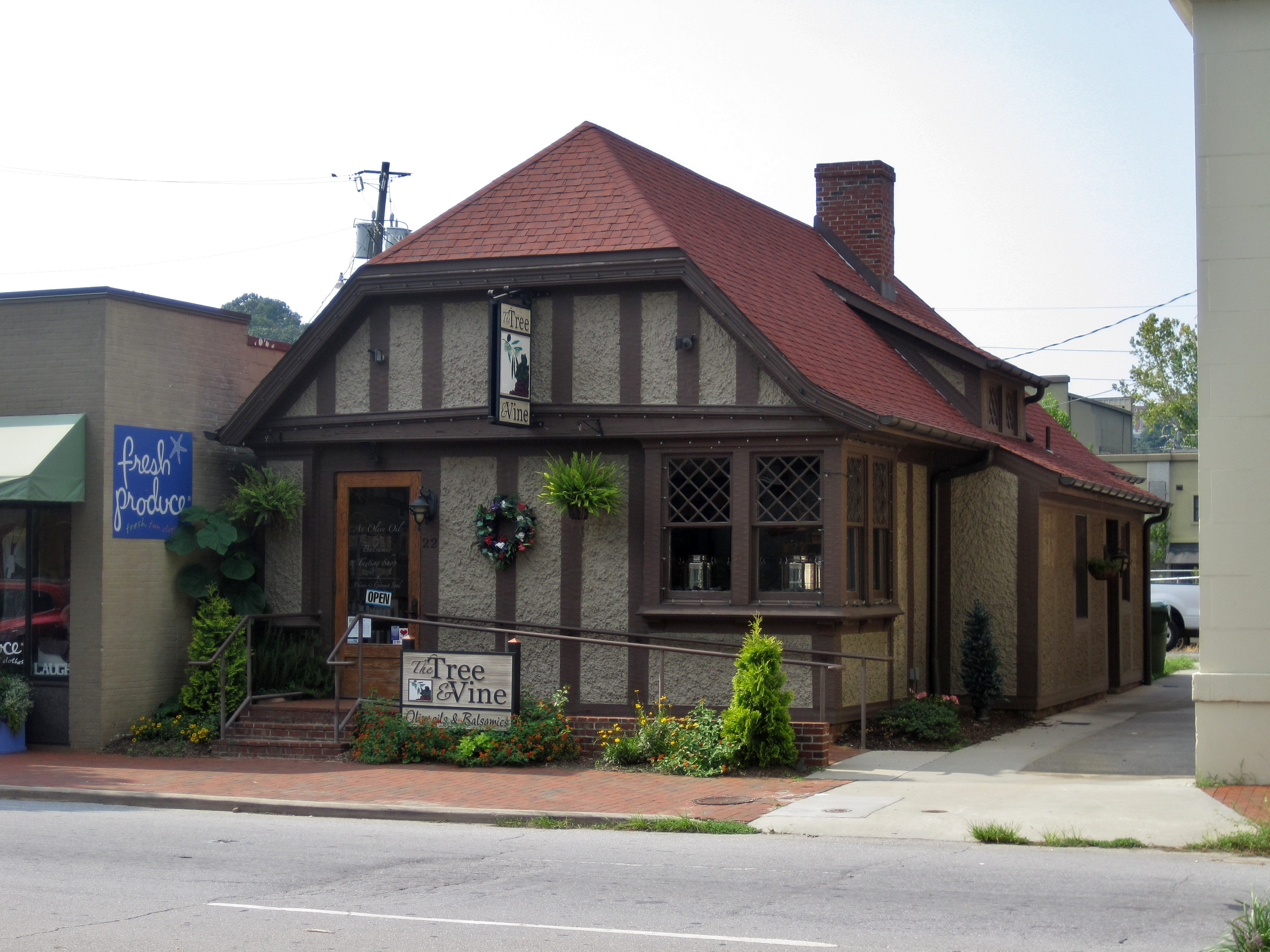
- Biltmore Shoe Store, August 2012

- Location within North Carolina Location within the United States
- Location: 8 Lodge St., Asheville, North Carolina
- Coordinates: 35°34′3″N 82°32′34″W
- Area: less than one acre
- Built: c. 1900
- Architect: Smith, Richard Sharp; Olmsted, Frederick Law
- MPS: Biltmore Village MRA
- NRHP reference No.: 79001669
- Added to NRHP: November 15, 1979

Biltmore Shoe Store is a historic commercial building located at Biltmore Village, Asheville, Buncombe County, North Carolina. It was designed by architect Richard Sharp Smith and built about 1900. It is a small one-story pebbledash-finished building with a clipped gable roof and half-timbering.

It was listed on the National Register of Historic Places in 1979.

== See also ==
- Biltmore Village Cottage District
- Biltmore Village Cottages
- Biltmore Village Commercial Buildings
