= Biltmore Village Commercial Buildings =

- U.S. National Register of Historic Places
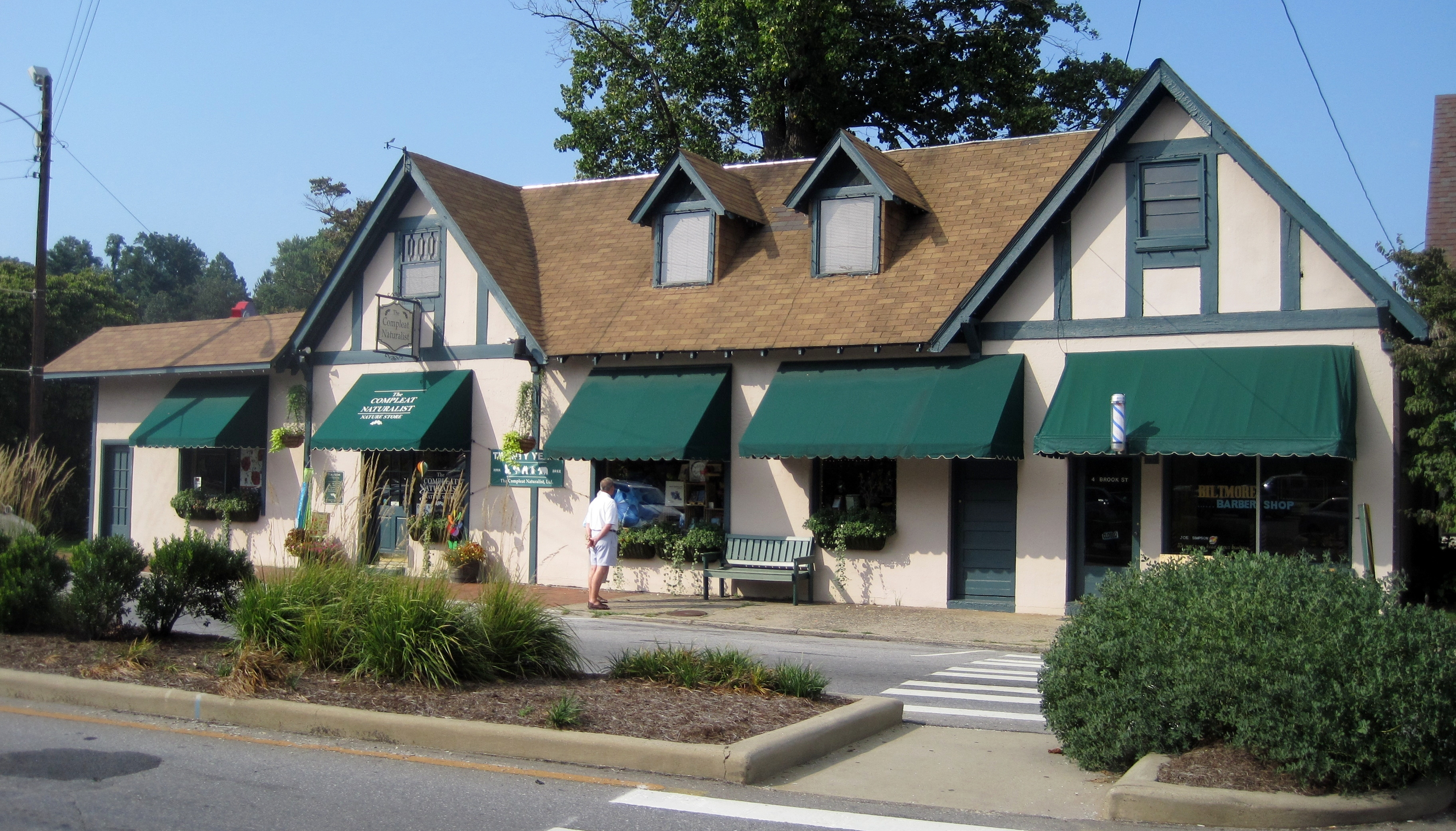
- Biltmore Village Commercial Buildings, August 2012

- Location within North Carolina Location within the United States
- Location: Brook St. and Biltmore Plaza, Asheville, North Carolina
- Coordinates: 35°34′3″N 82°32′34″W
- Area: less than one acre
- Built: c. 1900
- Architect: Smith, Richard Sharp
- MPS: Biltmore Village MRA
- NRHP reference No.: 79001670
- Added to NRHP: November 15, 1979

Biltmore Village Commercial Buildings is a set of two historic commercial buildings located at Biltmore Village, Asheville, Buncombe County, North Carolina. They were designed by architect Richard Sharp Smith and built about 1900. Included is a 1 1/2-story pebbledash finished building with a gable roof and half-timbering and a small one-story building that originally housed the Biltmore Village Post Office.

It was listed on the National Register of Historic Places in 1979.

== See also ==
- Biltmore Village Cottage District
- Biltmore Village Cottages
- Biltmore Shoe Store
