= Black Mountain Downtown Historic District =

Historic district in North Carolina, United States

- U.S. National Register of Historic Places
- U.S. Historic district
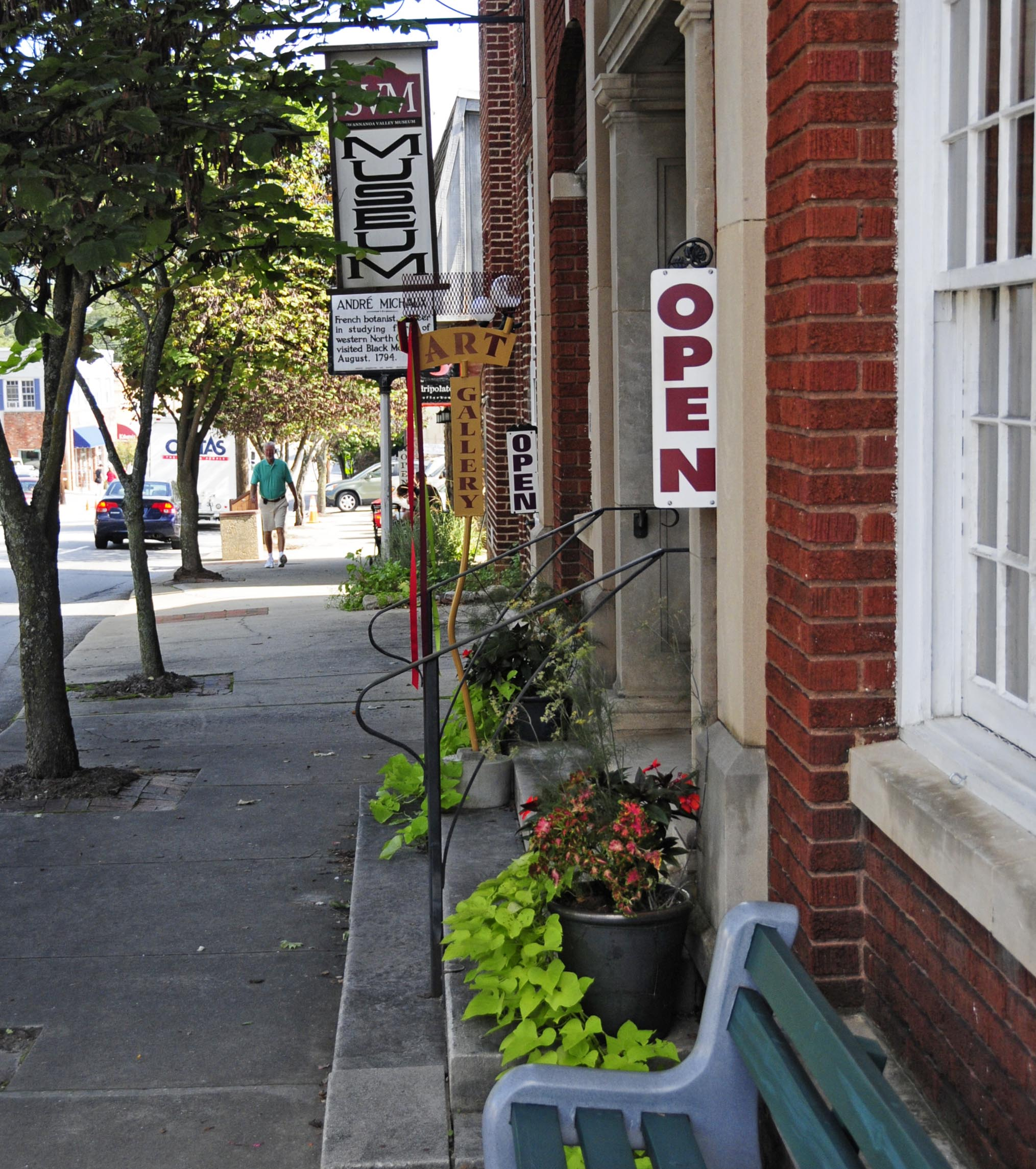
- Black Mountain Downtown Historic District, September 2012

- Location within North Carolina Location within the United States
- Location: Black Mountain Ave., Sutton Ave., Cherry, Broadway and State Sts., Black Mountain, North Carolina
- Coordinates: 35°36′58″N 82°19′14″W
- Area: 14.4 acres (5.8 ha)
- Built: 1909
- Architect: Smith, Richard Sharp
- Architectural style: Early Commercial, Moderne, et al.
- NRHP reference No.: 04000570
- Added to NRHP: June 2, 2004

Black Mountain Downtown Historic District is a national historic district located at Black Mountain, Buncombe County, North Carolina. The district encompasses 56 contributing buildings and 1 contributing structure in the central business district of Black Mountain. The district includes a variety of late-19th and early-20th century commercial and institutional buildings in the Commercial Style, American Craftsman, Classical Revival, Art Deco and Art Moderne. Notable buildings include the George Stepp House (1907), Black Mountain Depot (1909), firehouse (1921) designed by Richard Sharp Smith, town hall (1927), Kaltman Building (1928), and Pure Oil Service Station (c. 1945).

It was listed on the National Register of Historic Places in 2004.

== Gallery ==
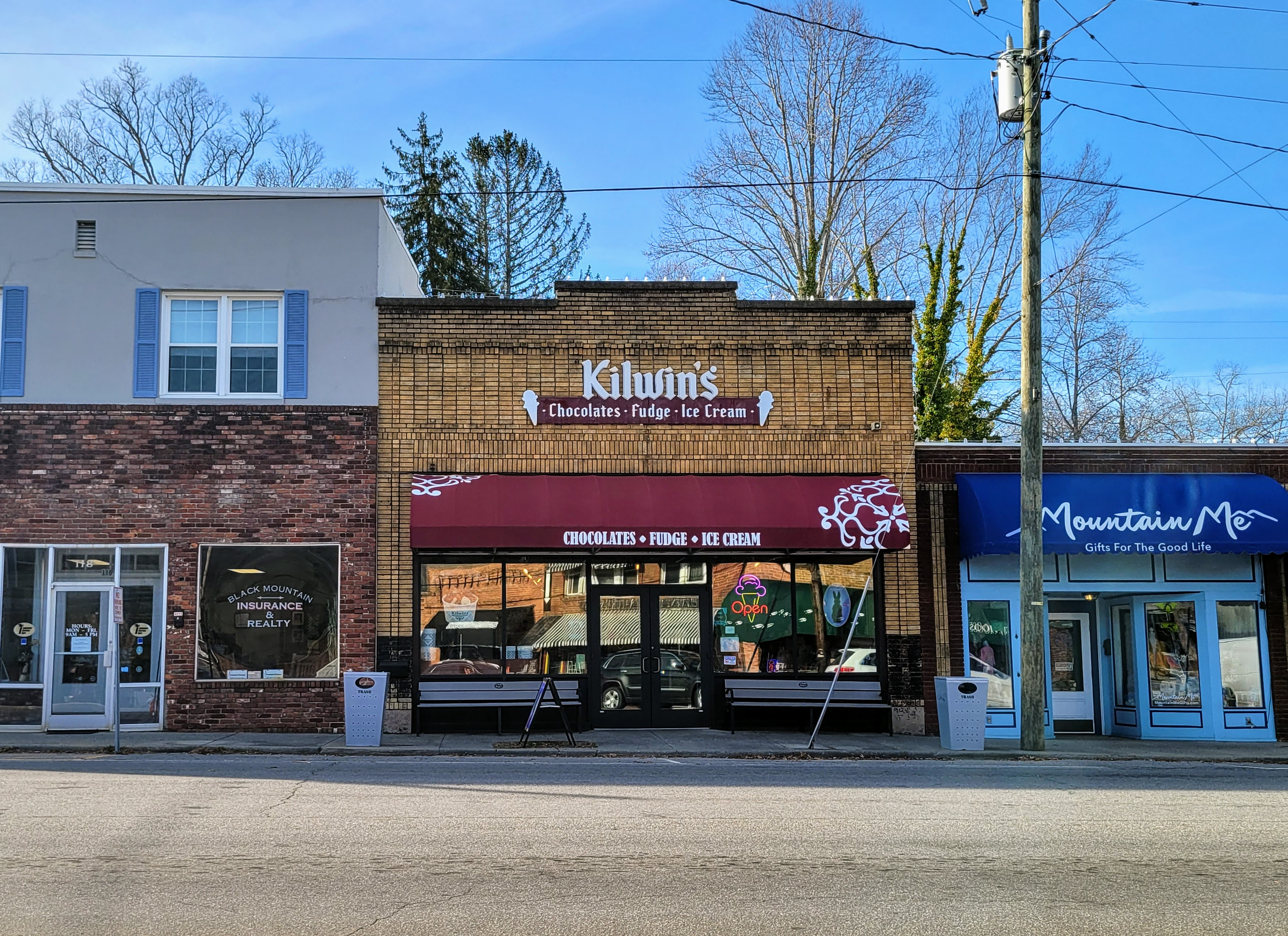
Victory Theater, 2022

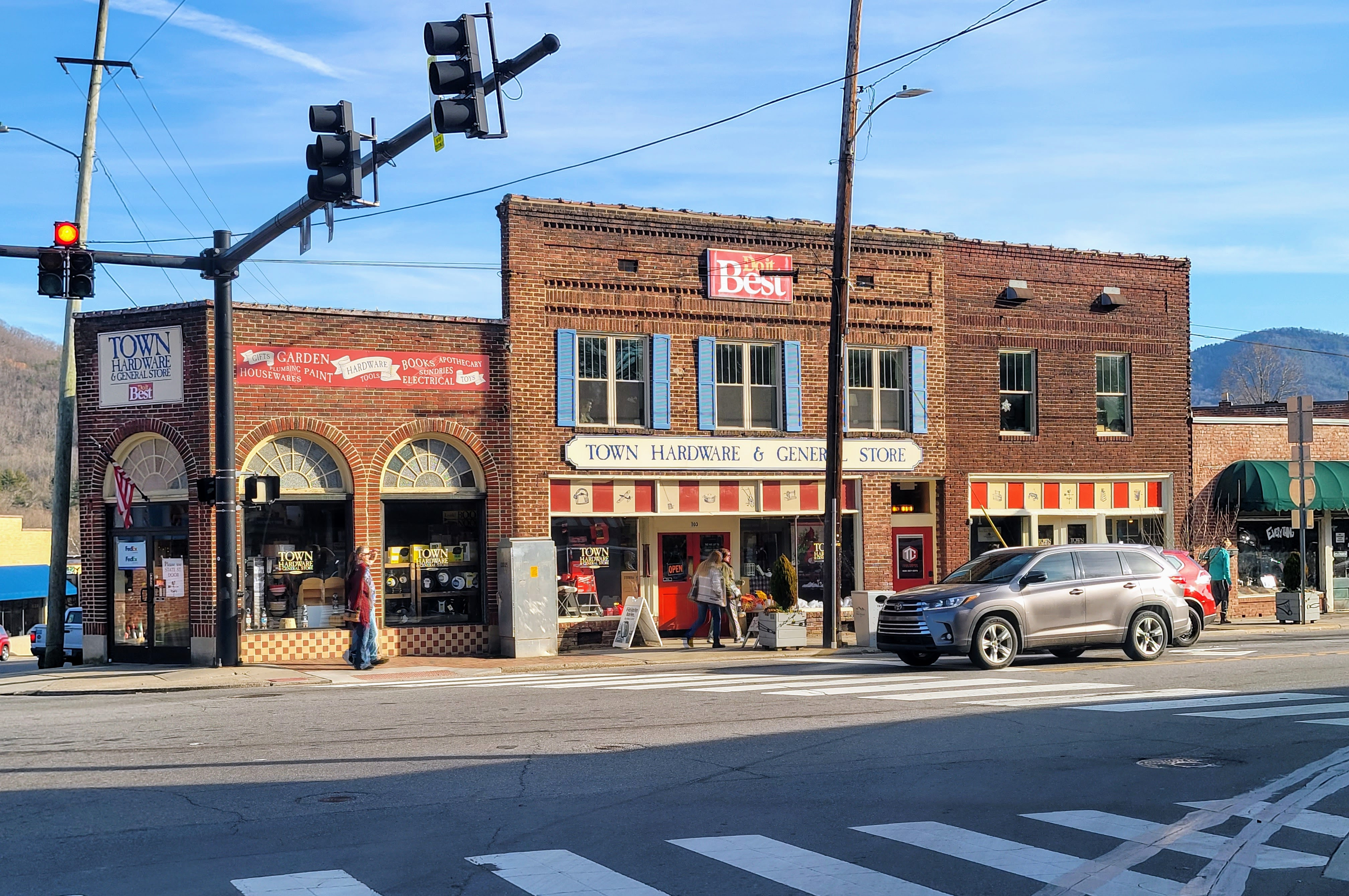
Pharmacy Building, Black Mountain Hardware and Five-and-Dime, 2022

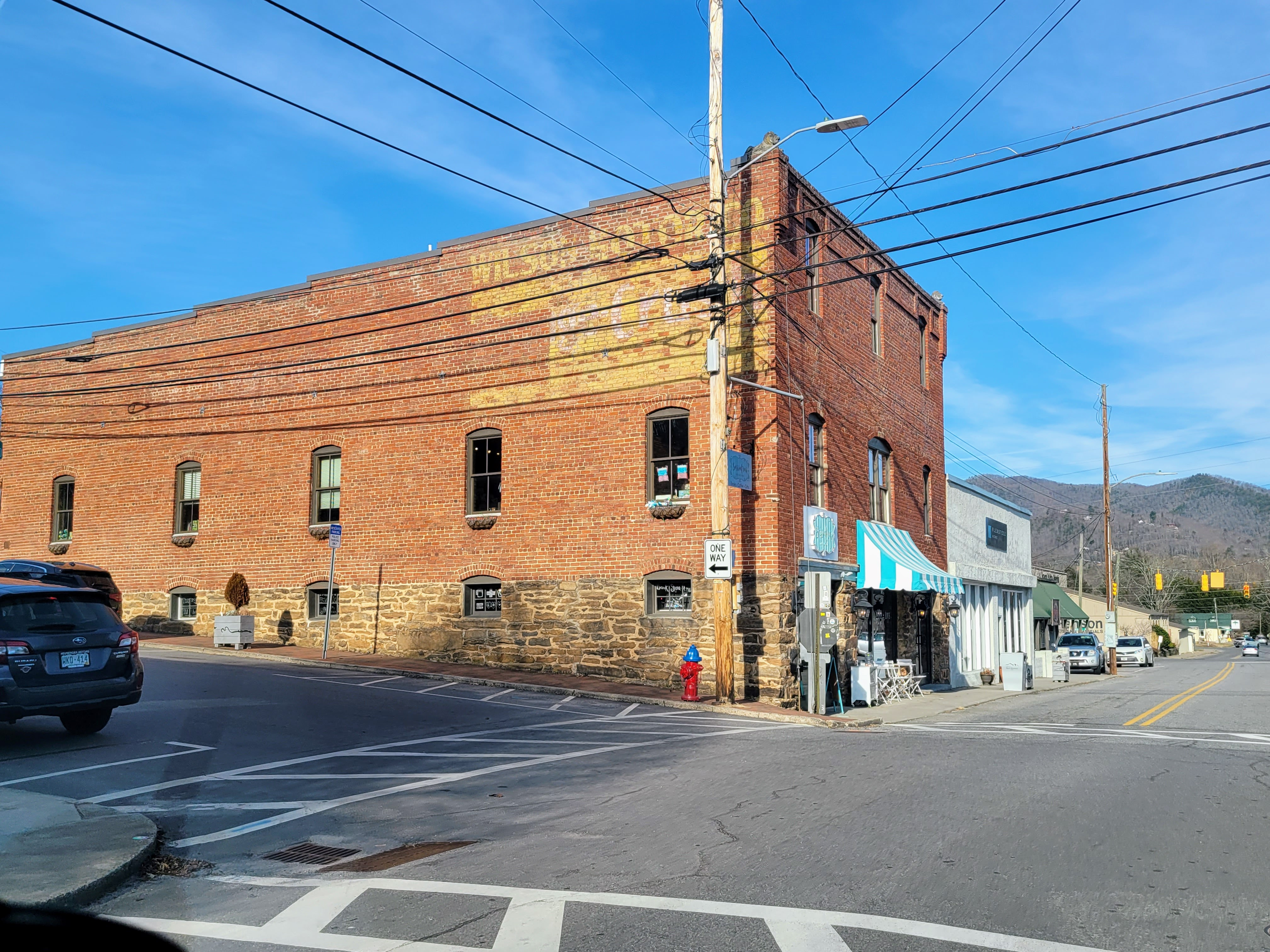
Brown Livery Stable, 2022

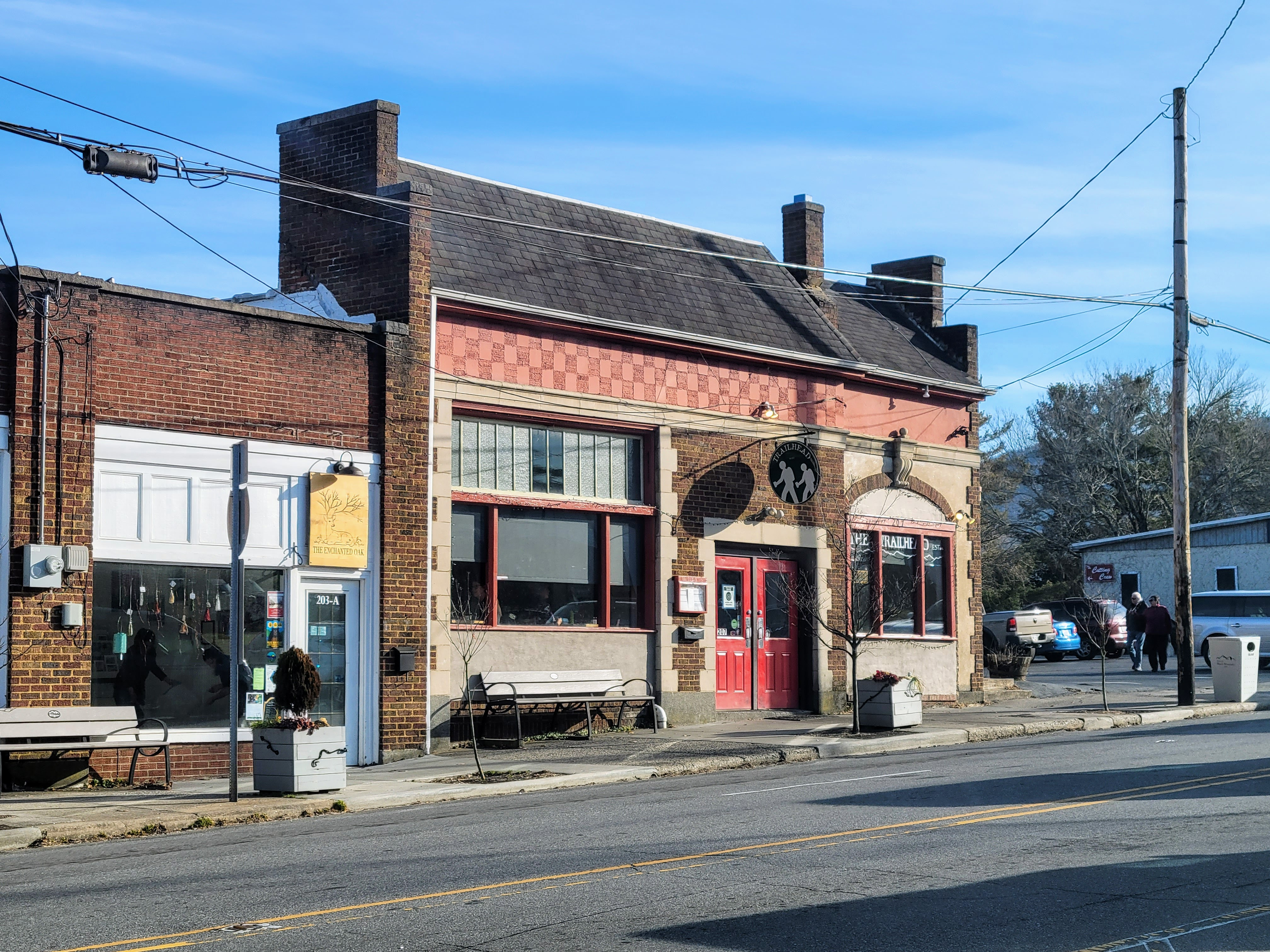
205 West State Street, 2022

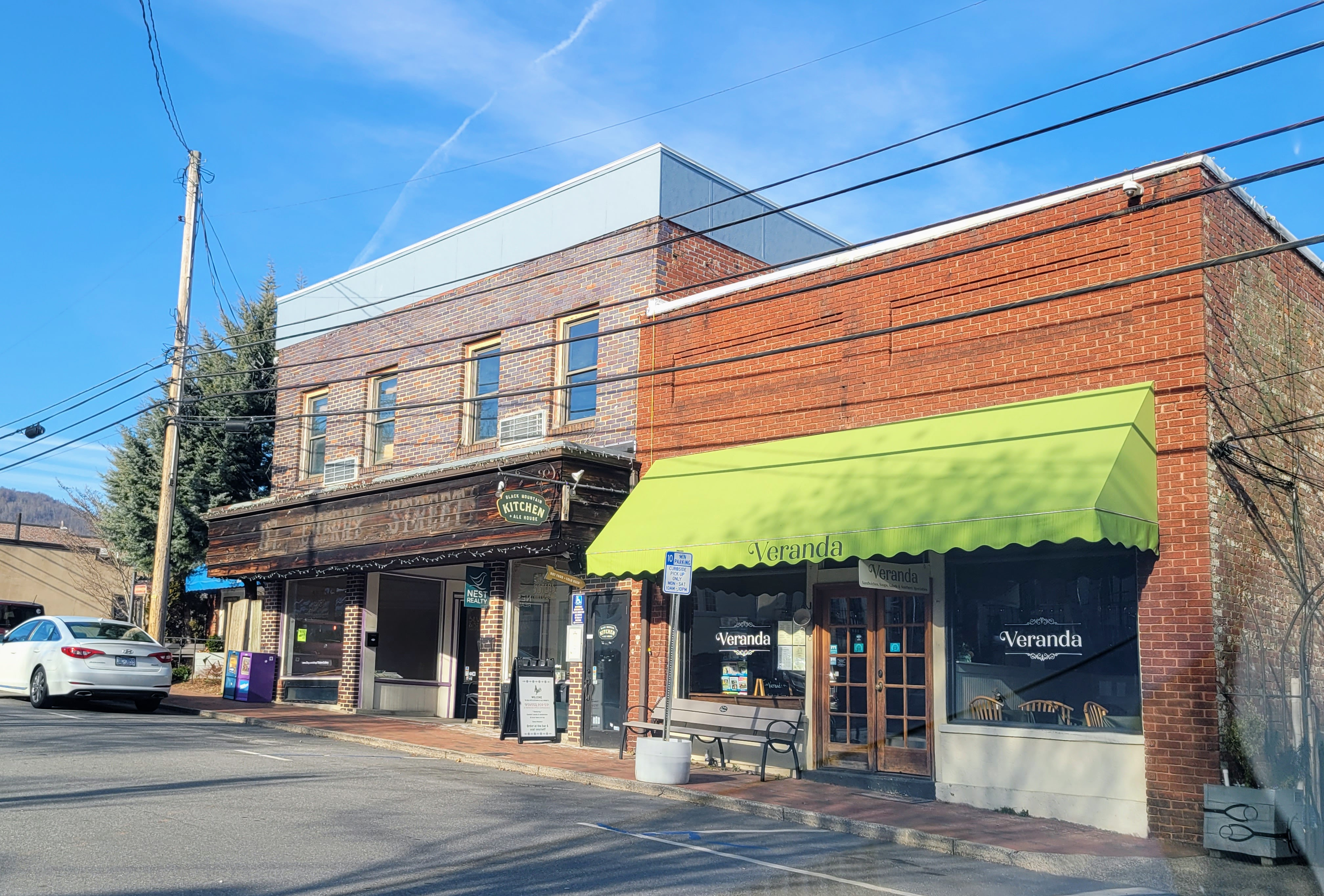
117 Cherry Street and Carolina Feed Store, 2022

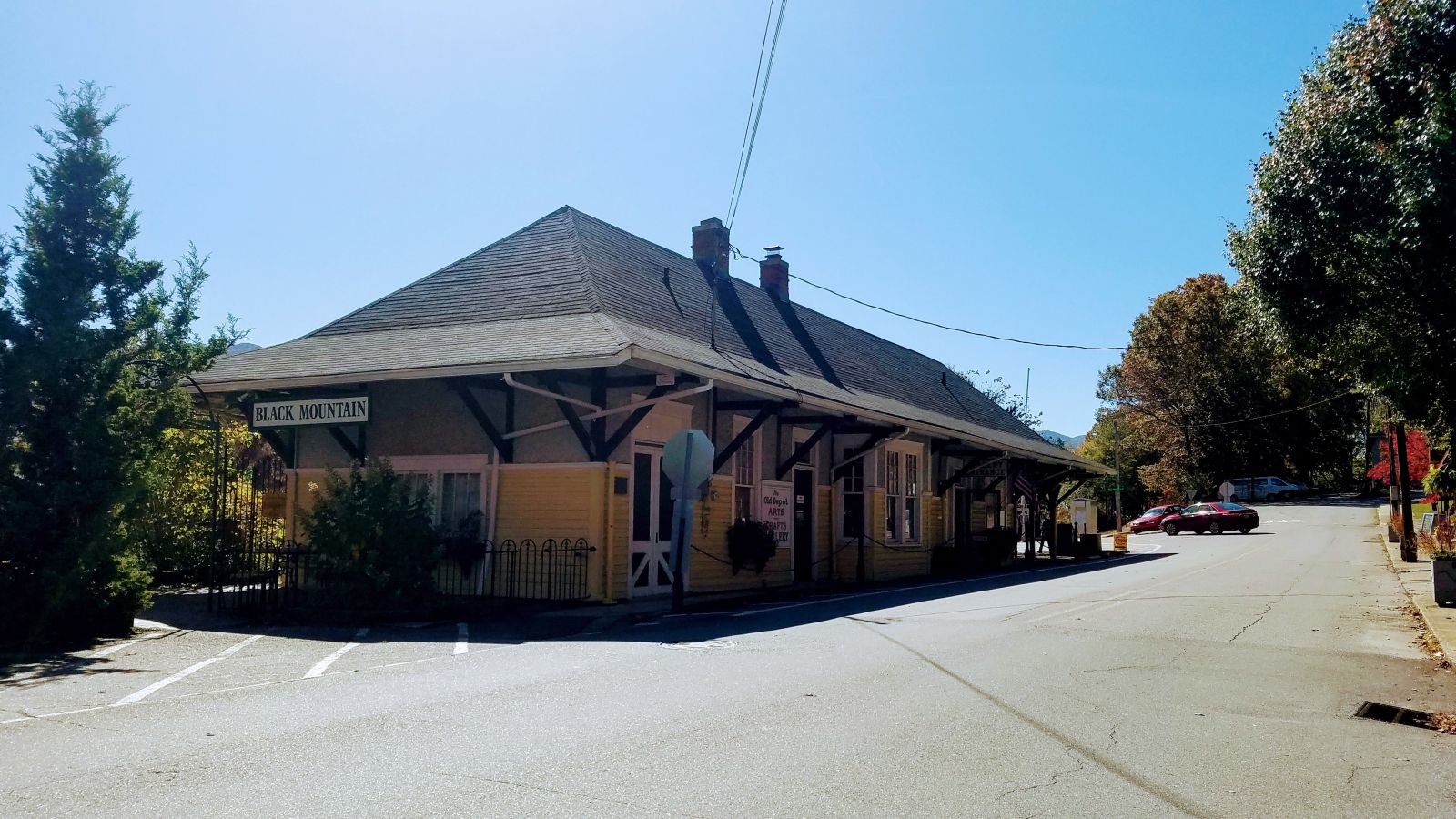
Black Mountain Depot
