= Proximity Park Historic District =

Historic district in North Carolina, United States

- U.S. National Register of Historic Places
- U.S. Historic district
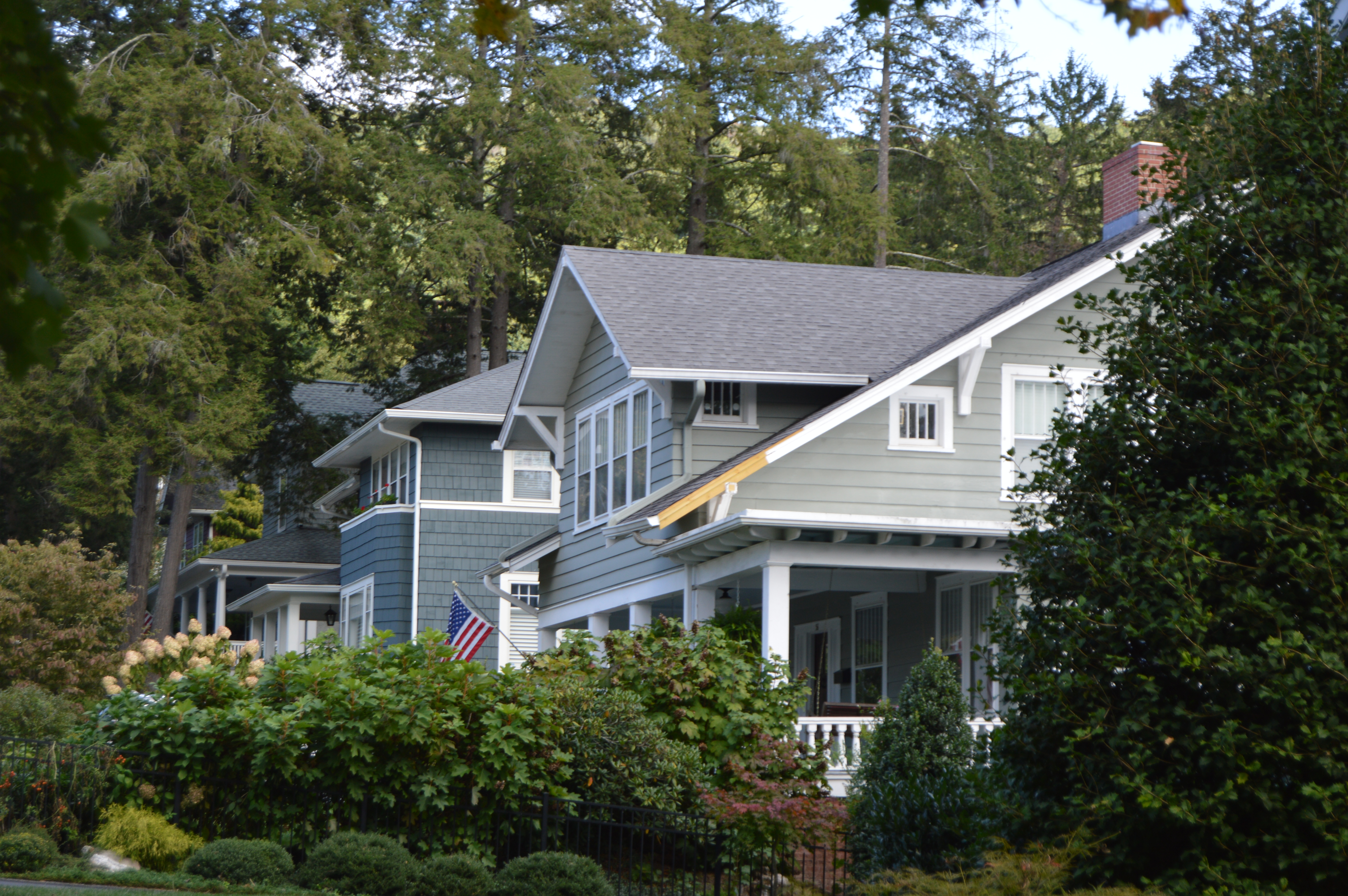
- Houses on Edgemont Road

- Location within North Carolina Location within the United States
- Location: Roughly bounded by Macon Ave., Howland Rd., Woodlink Rd., Charlotte St., and Sunset Trail, Asheville, North Carolina
- Coordinates: 35°36′52″N 82°32′33″W
- Area: 31 acres (13 ha)
- Built: 1907
- Architect: Richard Sharp Smith, et al.
- Architectural style: Bungalow/craftsman, Colonial Revival, Spanish Colonial Revival
- NRHP reference No.: 08000974
- Added to NRHP: October 8, 2008

Proximity Park Historic District is a national historic district located at Asheville, Buncombe County, North Carolina. The district encompasses 62 contributing buildings and 1 contributing site in a predominantly residential section of Asheville. The district was largely developed in early-20th century, and includes representative examples of Colonial Revival, Mission Revival, and Bungalow style dwellings. Located in the district is the separately listed St. Mary's Church (1914) and rectory (1923) designed by architect Richard Sharp Smith.

It was listed on the National Register of Historic Places in 2008.

== Gallery ==
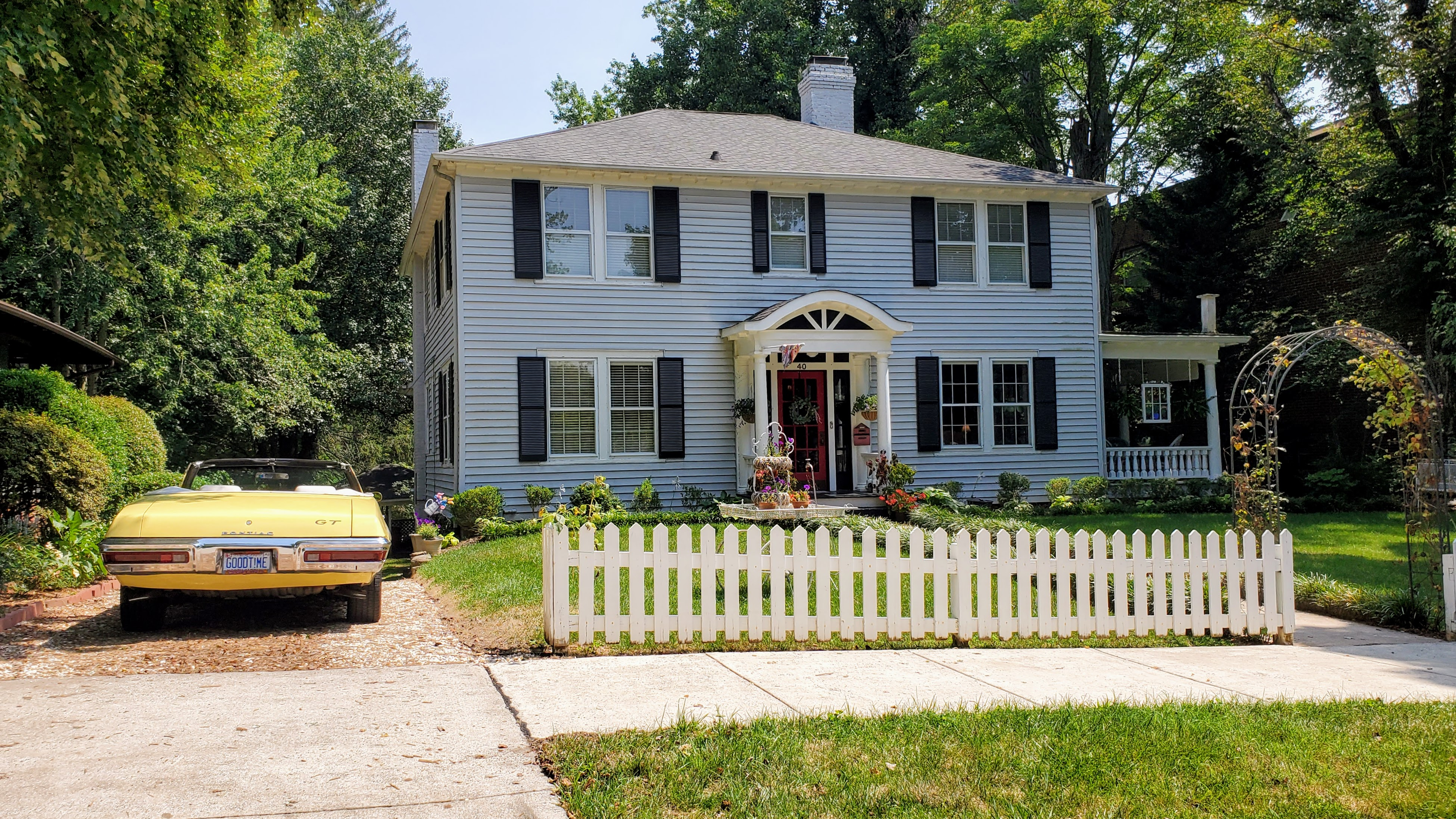
40 Edgemont Road, 2021

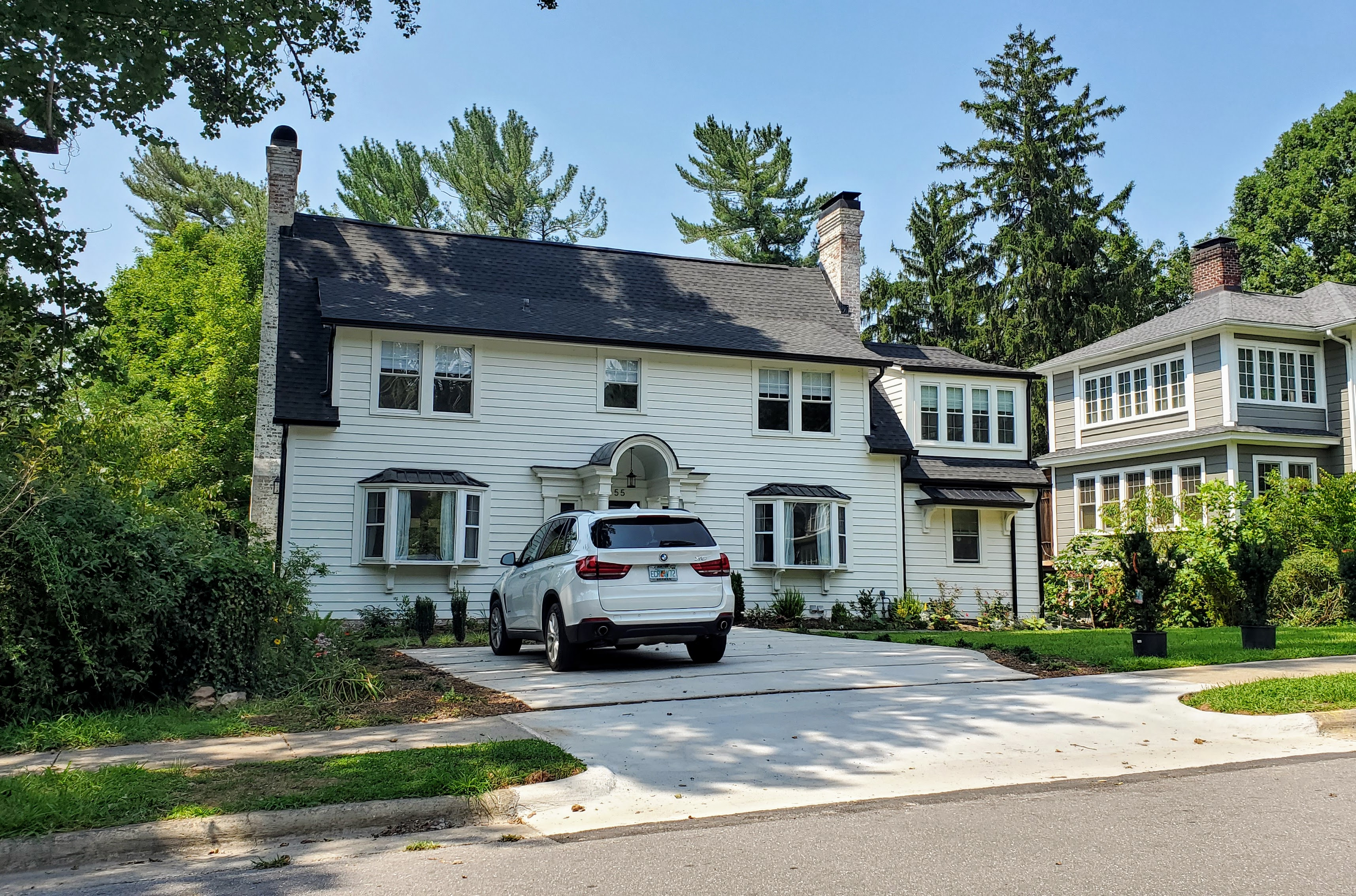
55 Edgemont Road, 2021

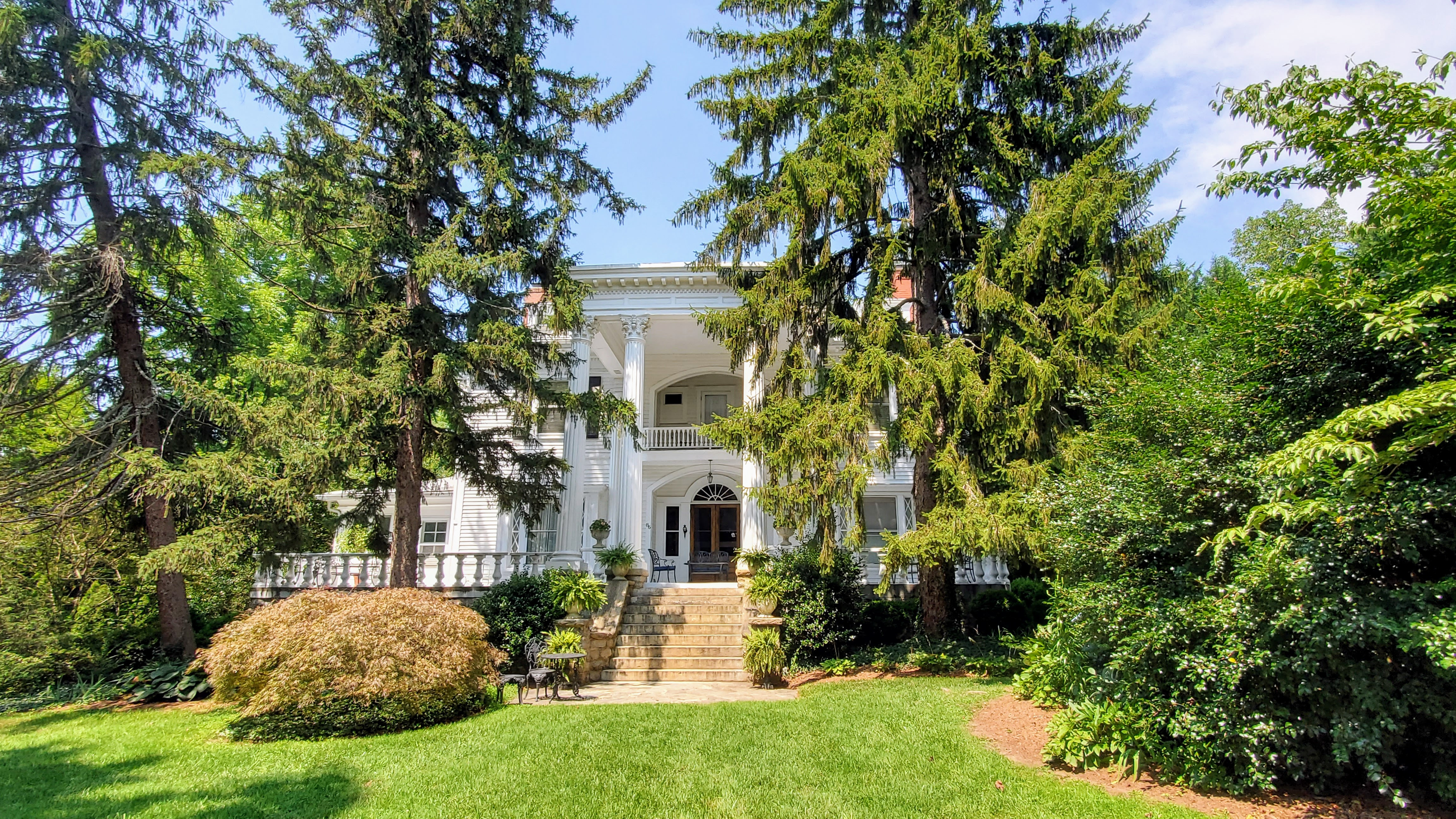
Dr. Carl V. Reynolds House, 2021

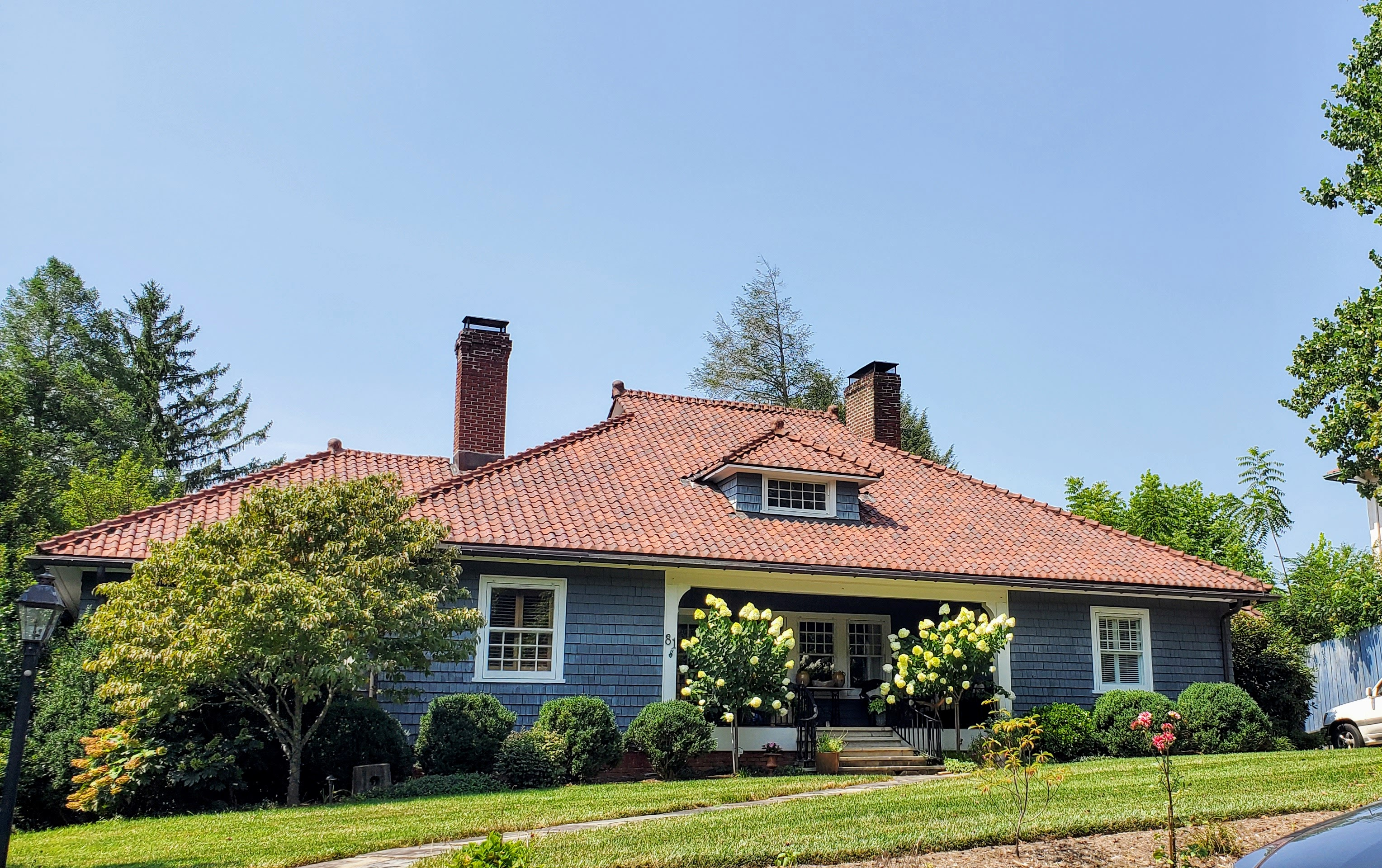
Golf Club House-C. C. Millard House, 2021

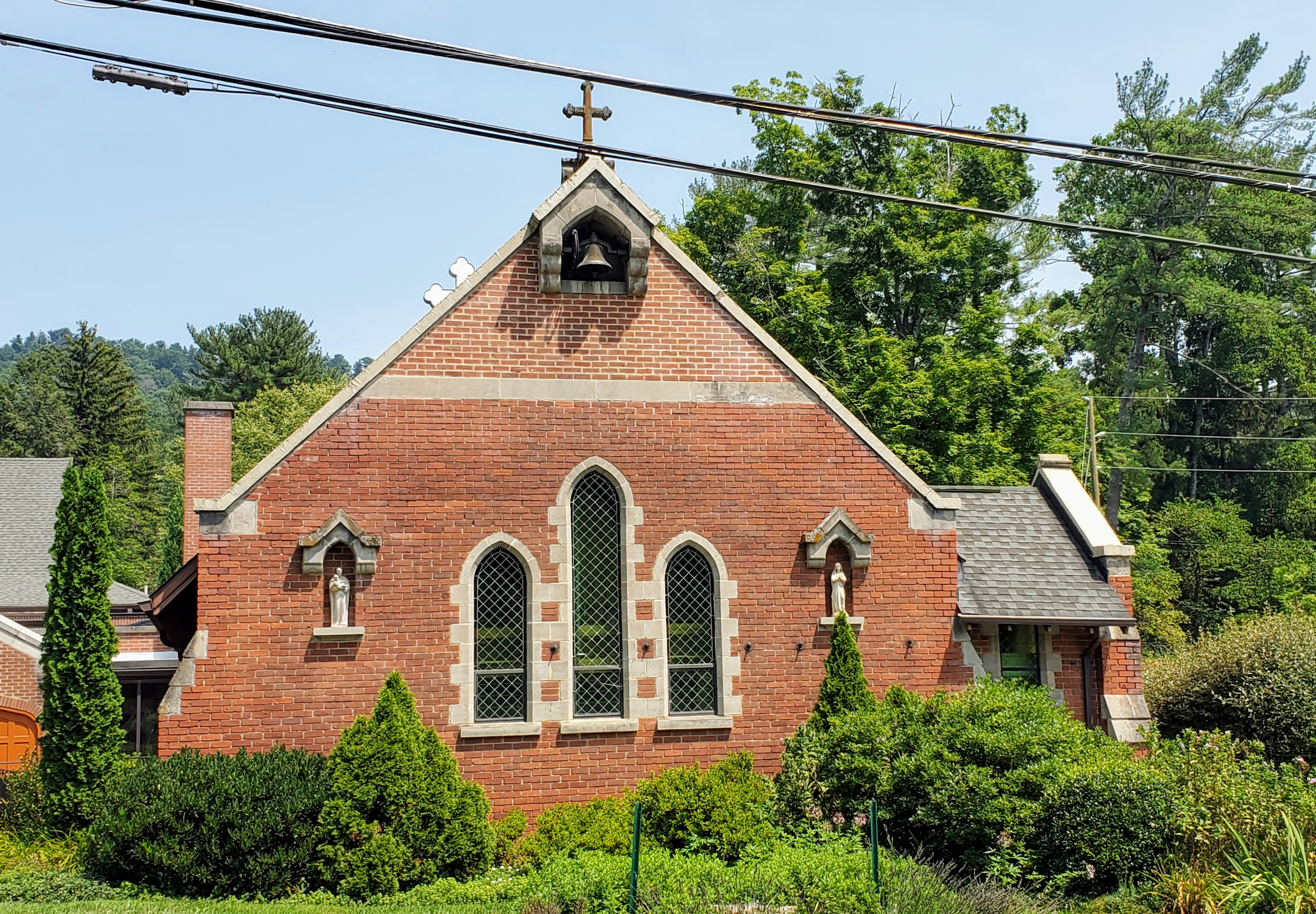
St. Marys Church, 2021
