= Richard Sharp Smith House =

Historic house in North Carolina, United States

- U.S. National Register of Historic Places
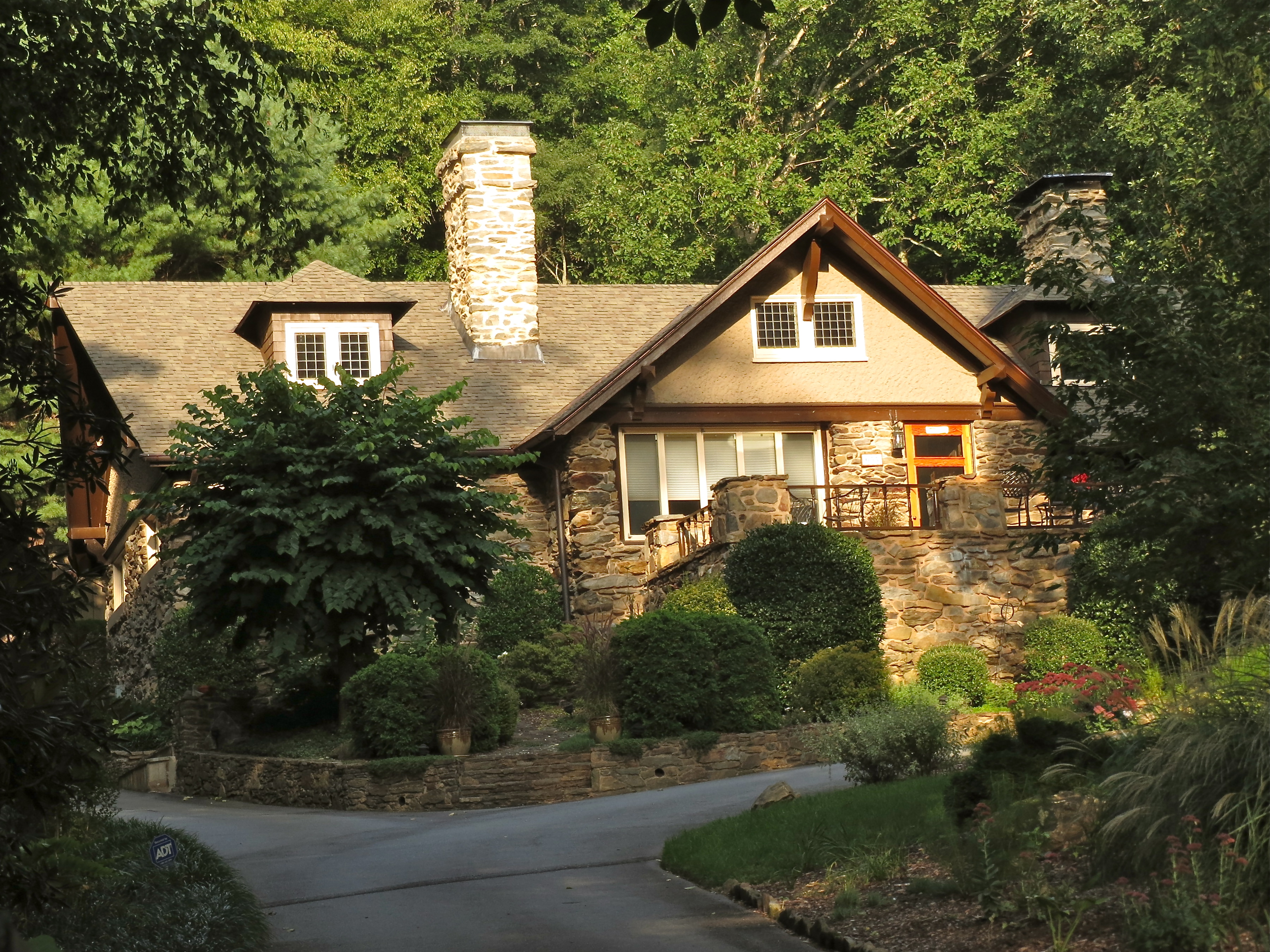

- Location within North Carolina Location within the United States
- Location: 655 Chunns Cove Rd., Asheville, North Carolina
- Coordinates: 35°37′17″N 82°31′9″W
- Area: 2.4 acres (0.97 ha)
- Built: 1902-1903
- Architect: Smith, Richard Sharp
- Architectural style: Bungalow/craftsman
- NRHP reference No.: 08001361
- Added to NRHP: January 22, 2009

Richard Sharp Smith House, now known as Stoneybrook, is a historic home located at Asheville, Buncombe County, North Carolina. It was designed and built by architect Richard Sharp Smith in 1902–1903. It is a 1 1/2-story, stone and stucco American Craftsman / bungalow style dwelling. It features a projecting front gable bay and leaded glass windows.

It was listed on the National Register of Historic Places in 2009.
