= Clarence Barker Memorial Hospital =

- U.S. National Register of Historic Places
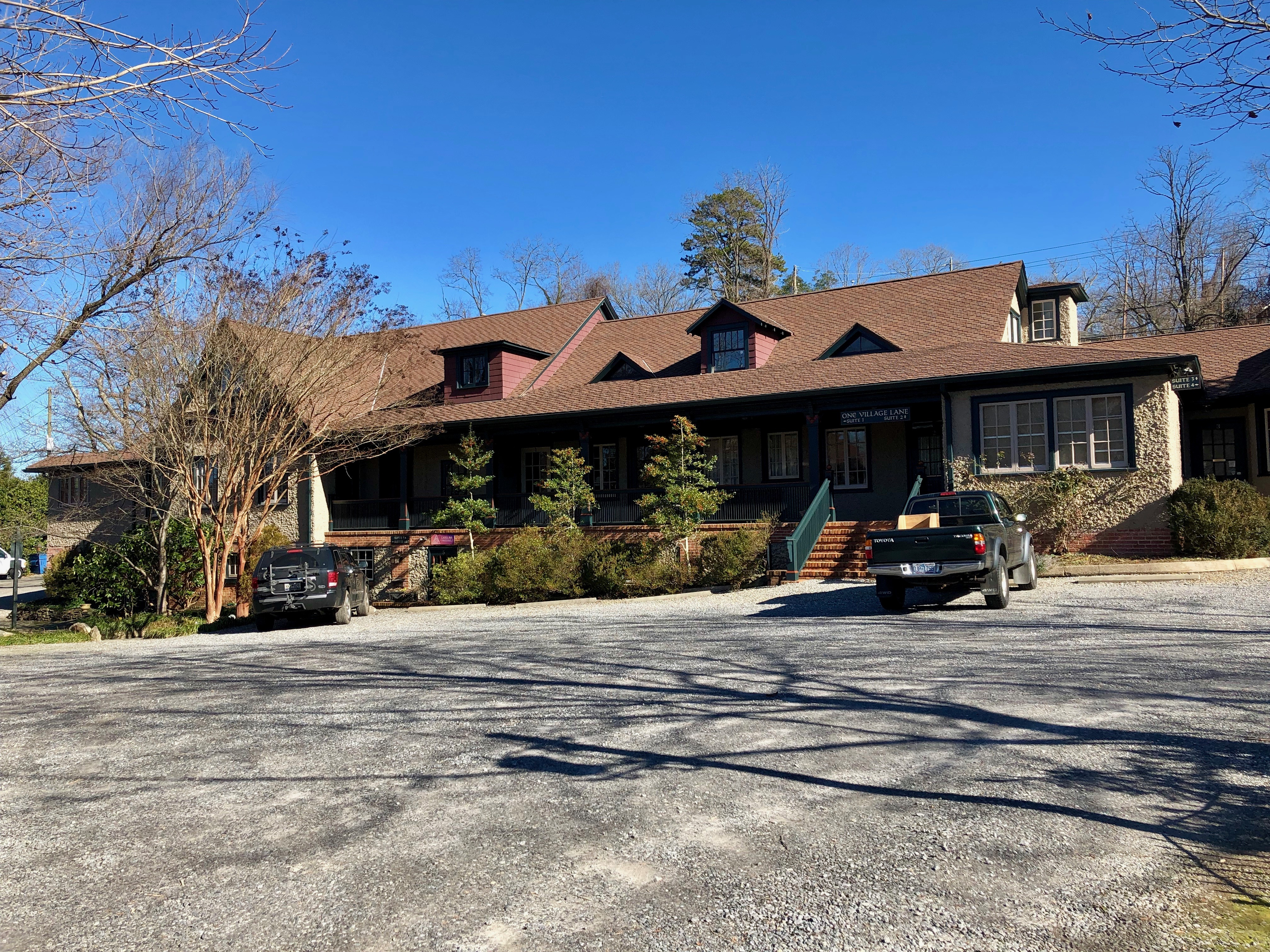
- Clarence Barker Memorial Hospital, January 2019

- Location within North Carolina Location within the United States
- Location: 2-6 Reed St., Asheville, North Carolina
- Coordinates: 35°33′54″N 82°32′28″W
- Area: 1.3 acres (0.53 ha)
- Built: 1907
- Architect: Smith, Richard Sharp
- MPS: Biltmore Village MRA
- NRHP reference No.: 79001667
- Added to NRHP: November 15, 1979

Clarence Barker Memorial Hospital is a historic hospital building located at Biltmore Village, Asheville, Buncombe County, North Carolina. It was designed by architect Richard Sharp Smith and built in 1907. It is a 1 1/2-story, pebbledash finished building with a full-width verandah.

It was listed on the National Register of Historic Places in 1979. It was named after the late cousin of Biltmore Estate owner George Washington Vanderbilt II.
