= Richard Sharp Smith =

British-American architect (1853–1924)

- Born: July 7, 1853; Yorkshire, England
- Died: February 8, 1924 (aged 70); Asheville, North Carolina, US
- Education: Kensington School of Art
- Occupation: Architect
- Practice: Smith & Carrier; Richard S. Smith, Architect; Richard Morris Hunt; Bradford Gilbert; Reed Brothers
- Buildings: Asheville Masonic Temple; Basilica of St. Lawrence; Henderson County Courthouse; Jackson County Courthouse; Madison County Courthouse; Swain County Courthouse; Young Men's Institute
- Projects: Biltmore Estate; Biltmore Village

Richard Sharp Smith (July 7, 1853 – February 8, 1924) was an English-born American architect, noted for his association with George W. Vanderbilt's Biltmore Estate and Asheville, North Carolina. Smith worked for some of America's important architectural firms of the late 19th century—Richard Morris Hunt, Bradford Lee Gilbert, and Reid & Reid—before establishing his practice in Asheville. His most significant body of work is in Asheville and Western North Carolina, including dozens of buildings that are listed on the National Register of Historic Places or are contributing structures to National Register Historic Districts.

While working for Richard Morris Hunt, Smith was the supervising architect for Biltmore. After Smith established his solo practice, Vanderbilt continued working with Smith to create additional buildings for the estate and the surrounding area. Smith designed more than 24 buildings for Biltmore Village for Vanderbilt between 1900 and 1920. During these projects, Smith developed a vernacular style that combined elements of Craftsman, Colonial Revival, English cottage, Shingle, and Tudor Revival architectural styles. This style was reflected in Smith's other house and church designs throughout Asheville in the late 19th and early 20th centuries.

In contrast, Smith used reinforced concrete construction for a significant number of commercial and public buildings in downtown Asheville and courthouses for Henderson, Jackson, Madison, and Swain Counties. Many of his projects were created in collaboration with his business partner, engineer Albert Heath Carrier. This allowed Smith to focus on clients and creative design, while Carrier managed the mechanical and structural engineering aspects of their projects. Their partnership was extremely prolific; between 1905 and Smith's death in 1924, Smith & Carrier designed more than 700 buildings.

Between 1900 and 1920, Smith designed almost every significant building in downtown Asheville, including hotels, medical buildings, office buildings, schools, and theaters. Clay Griffith with the North Carolina State Historic Preservation Office says, "The influence of Richard Sharp Smith’s architecture in Asheville and western North Carolina during the first quarter of the twentieth century cannot be overstated."

== Early life ==
Richard Sharp Smith was born in Yorkshire, England, the son of Saleta (née Watterson) and Jones Smith. He is thought to have studied architecture at the Kensington School of Art in London. He received additional architectural training in the office of George Smith, his cousin. He worked with various firms in Manchester before immigrating to the United States in 1882.

== Career ==
In 1882, Smith became an architect with Reid Brothers, an architectural and engineering firm in Evansville, Indiana. As Reid & Reid, this firm would go on to be one of the most important architectural firms in San Francisco; however, Smith only worked with them for a year. In 1883, he moved to New York City to work with the noted architect Bradford Lee Gilbert. Under Gilbert, Smith supervised the design and construction of railroad stations. However, Gilbert was also working on mansions for New York City's millionaires and a hotel, so Smith was exposed to a range of projects.

=== Biltmore ===
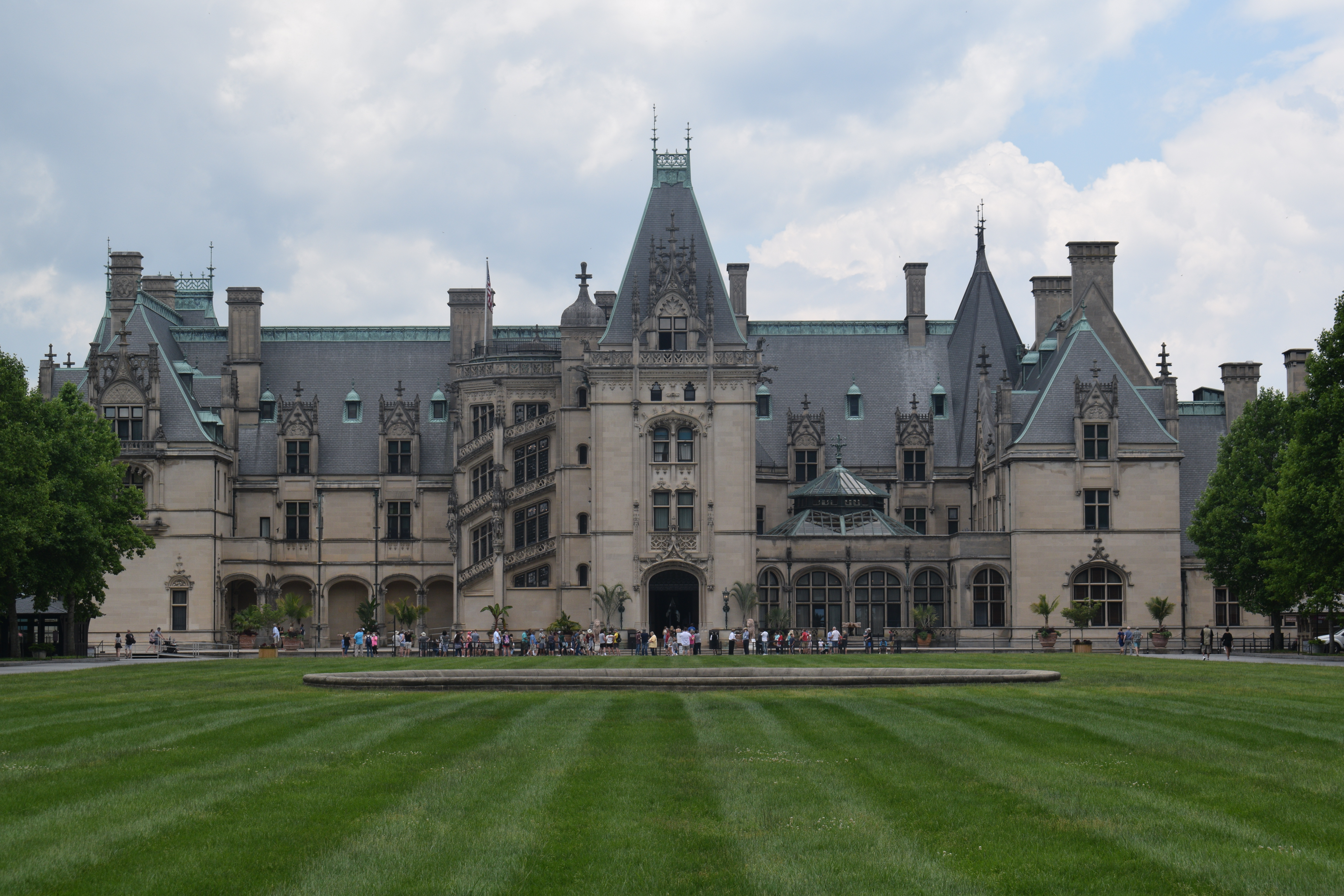
Biltmore, Asheville, North Carolina

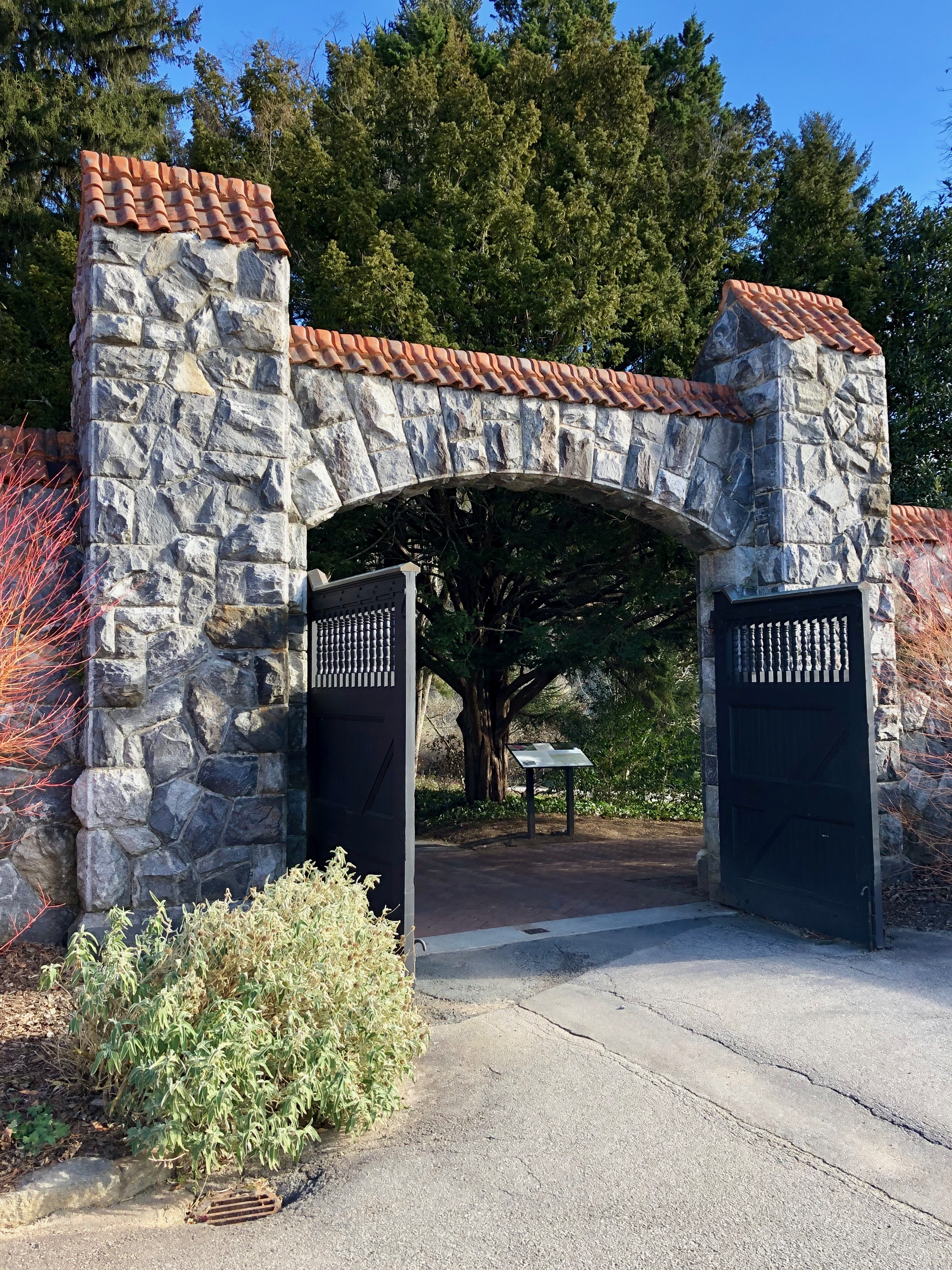
Walled Garden Gate

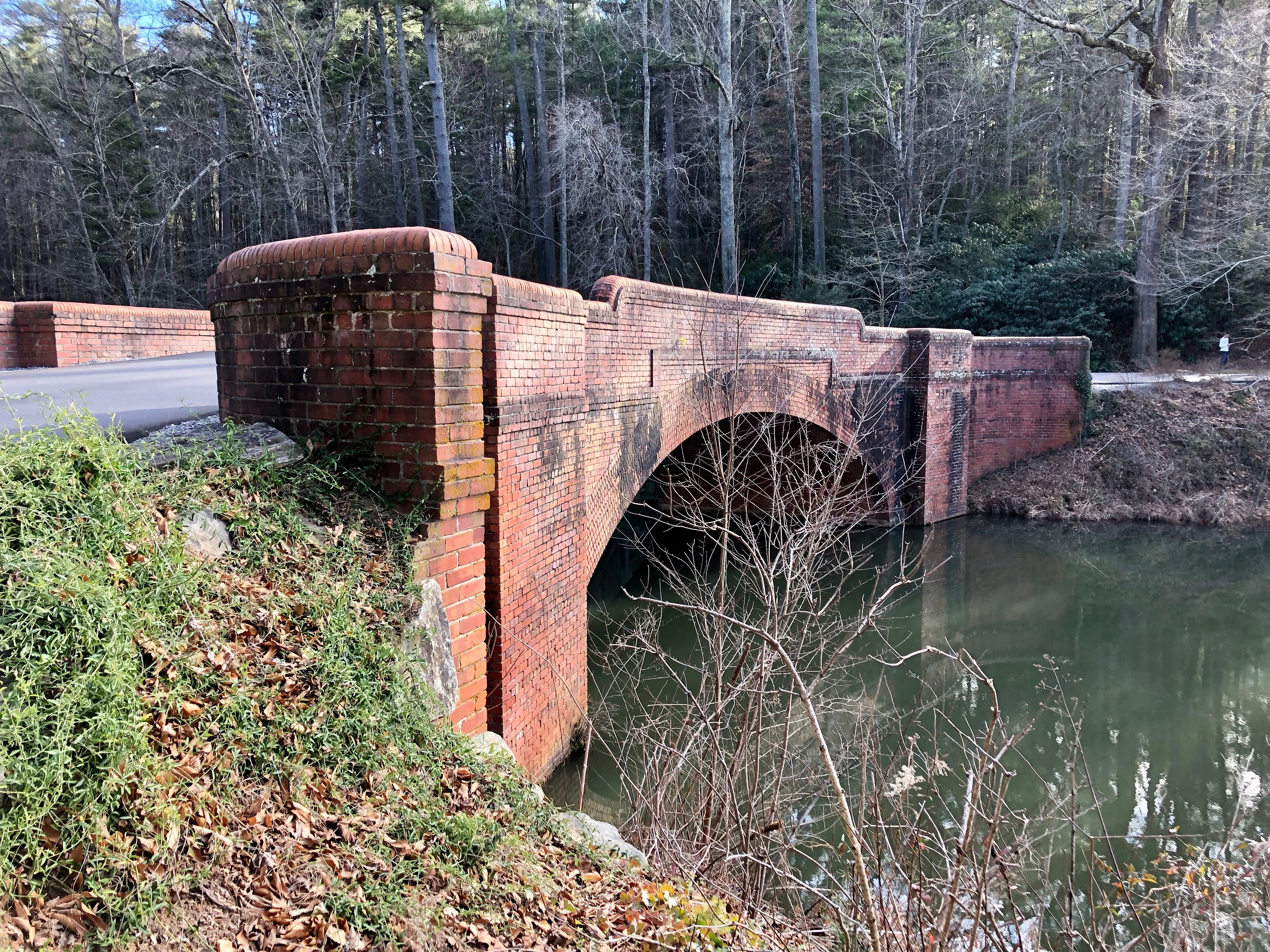
Mill Pond Bridge, Biltmore Estate

In 1886, Smith joined the firm of Richard Morris Hunt, at his New York City office. In 1889, Hunt assigned Smith to be the supervising architect for George W. Vanderbilt's Biltmore in Asheville, North Carolina. Biltmore was planned to be more than the largest home in America; it was also to be a working estate with expansive grounds designed by landscape architect Frederick Law Olmsted.

Smith oversaw the receipt of all materials and Biltmore's construction, along with supervising the principal contractor D. C. Weeks, and the work of carpenters, masons, metalworkers, painters, plasterers, stone carvers, stonecutters, wood carvers, and related craftsmen. He ordered limestone from the Hallowell Stone Company of Bedford, Indiana, and cement from the J. B. Speed Company of Louisville, Kentucky. Smith calculated his weekly orders based on the number of workmen and their skillset, the type of work being done, and the weather.

Smith was more than just a supervising architect; he designed many secondary buildings, cottages, and other structures for the estate while on site. One is the former Mule Stable which is now used as the Deerpark restaurant. He also designed Eastcote, a residence for Chauncey Beadle who was sent by Olmsted to supervise the estate's nursery operations. Eastcote is a two-story traditional-styled house with a pebble-dash finish. Smith also designed River Cliff Cottage in 1892 as a place for Vanderbilt's friends to stay during the construction of the main house. However, the since demolished brick and rough-cast cottage was best known as the temporary residence of Olmsted and his wife. Smith also renovated the Benjamin Julius Alexander Brick Farmhouse, an existing antebellum structure on the property, to serve as Vanderbilt's residence during the construction of Biltmore.

According to Olmsted, the estate's Walled Garden complex was a collaborative design of Olmsted, Hunt, and Smith. On October 30, 1891, Smith wrote Hunt:

This day I send you by express blueprints of Vegetable Garden Walls for your approval. I have also enclosed a copy for Mr. Olmsted should you think it necessary he should see what we are about to do. I don’t think he has been consulted on the changes and additions, viz. setting back of Gardener’s Cottage twelve feet from the entrance and the retreat and tool house northwest corner of garden. These changes seem to meet with Mr. Vanderbilt’s approval.

The last line also indicates that, after a year, Smith worked directly with their client, rather than through Hunt.

Smith also designed the Gardener's Cottage and the gates for the garden. His other grounds-related projects include designing five iconic brick bridges for the estate in the early 1890s; these were constructed of bricks produced by the estate's brickworks and feature a Tudor-arch profile. One spans the stream that feeds the bass pond and includes pedestrian overlooks in its side walls. On April 8, 1892, Smith wrote Hunt, "The bridge plans are nearly completed, and will be sent you early next week. I think a brick arch will answer, the pressure per foot is 6 tons. This should be safe for brick. As to the appearance, stone would be a pleasing change." The cost to excavate and build this brick bridge was $9,570 (equivalent to $311,698 in 2022).

Although Vanderbilt and Smith appear to have discussed designs directly, Smith still sent his work to New York for Hunt's approval and to get the firm's official stamp. In addition, Smith sent Hunt weekly reports and they had a go-between who would come to Asheville periodically, while Hunt worked on other projects. When Hunt died in July 1895, his son Richard Howland Hunt, who had worked on some of the secondary buildings for the estate, took over management of the firm. At this point, Smith hired extra workers, pushing the project toward an end. In the spring of 1896, Smith wrote a letter to an associate indicating his plans to depart Biltmore for a proposed trip to Europe, after which he would return to Asheville and set up his architectural practice. Smith wrote, “So far as Estate work is concerned, I am unable to say as Mr. Hunt wishes me to stay until everything is completed at Biltmore House”.

Smith was on-site at Biltmore from the start of construction in the summer of 1890 through essentially the house's completion in the fall of 1896 However, through his new practice, he would remain Vanderbilt's architect of choice for decades. Biltmore Estate and its related buildings are a National Historic Landmark.

=== R. S. Smith Architect ===
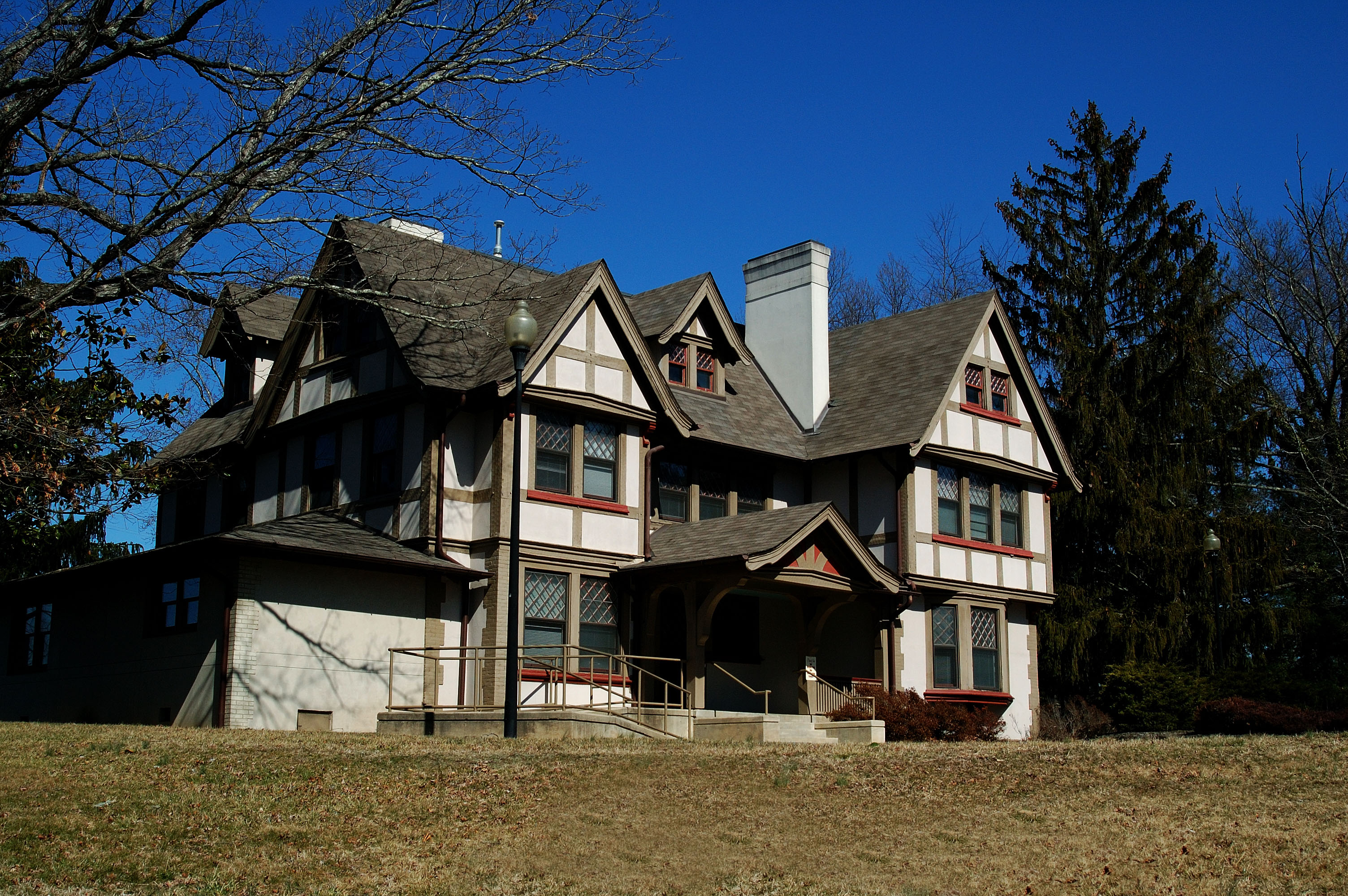
Sunnicrest, Asheville North Carolina

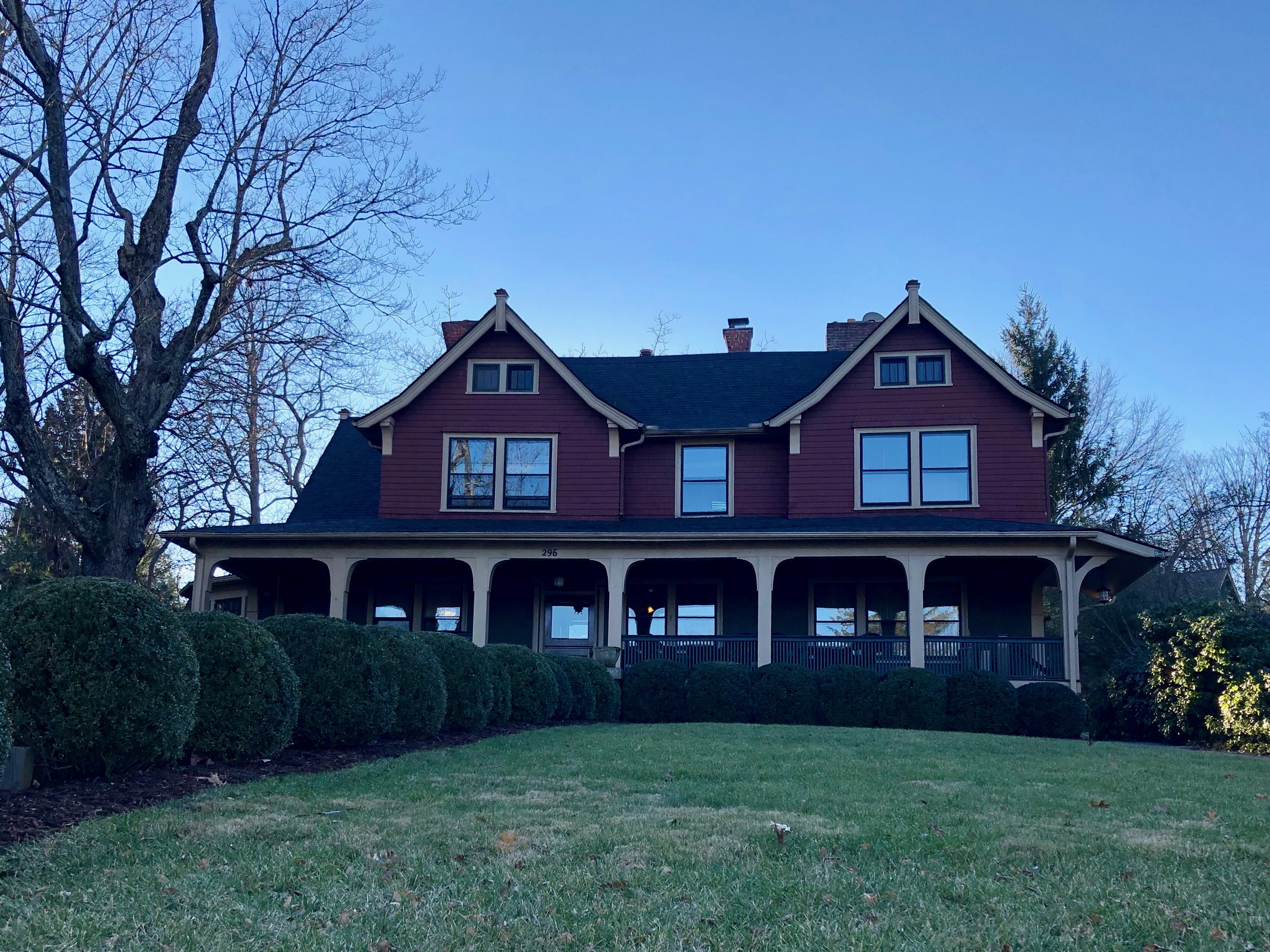
Charles S. Jordan House, Asheville, North Carolina

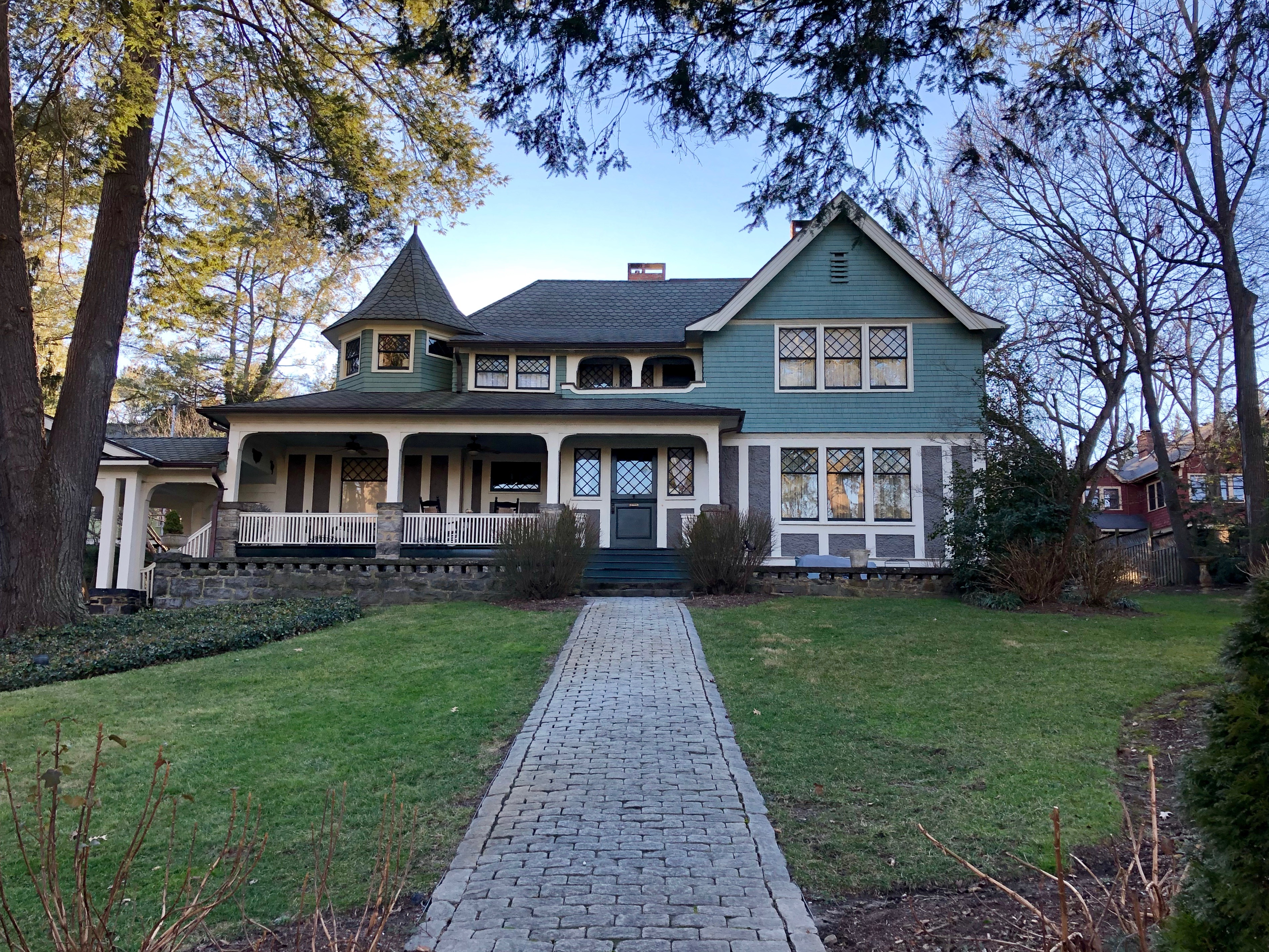
Ottis Green House, Asheville, North Carolina

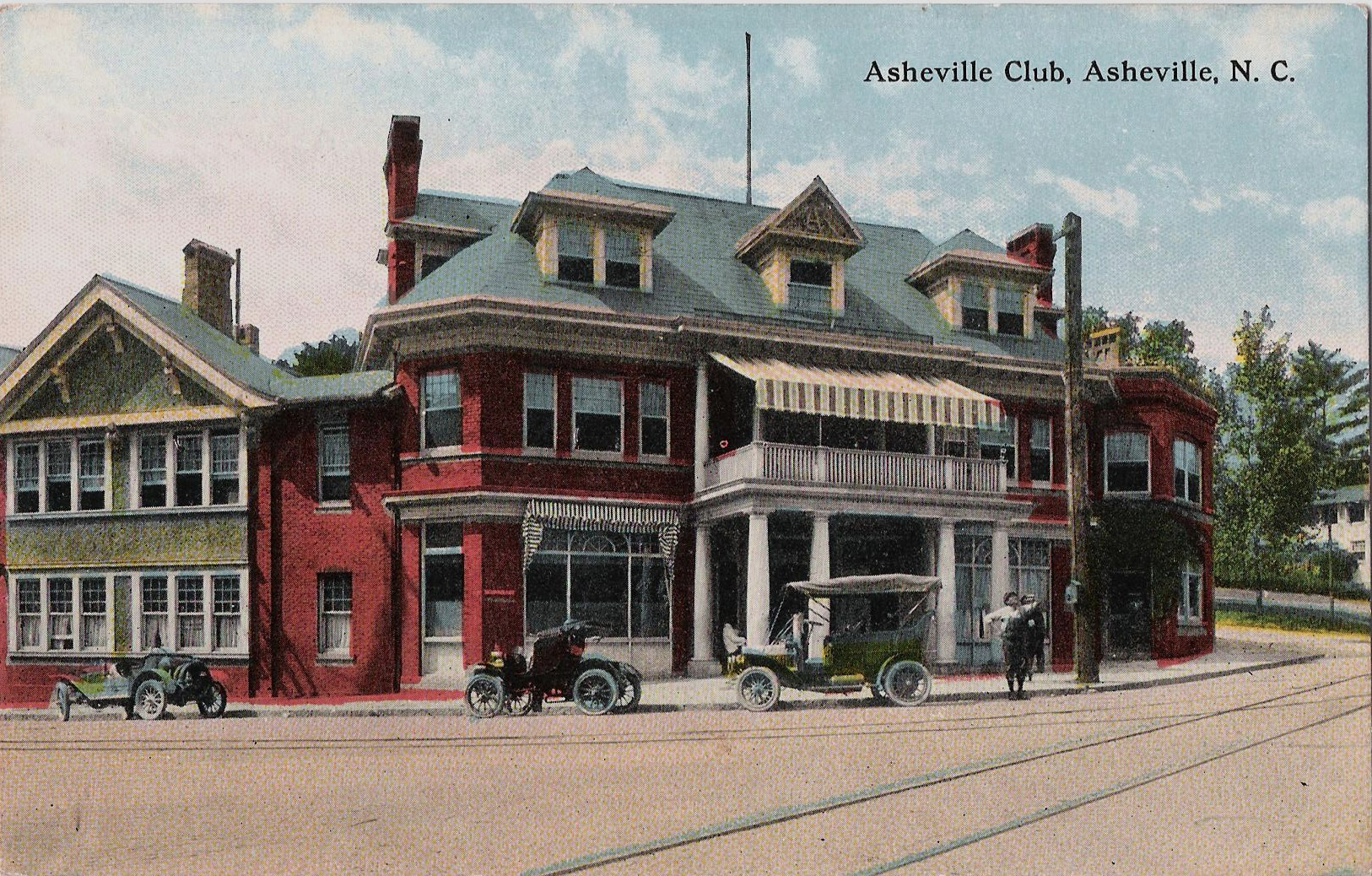
Asheville Club, Asheville, North Carolina

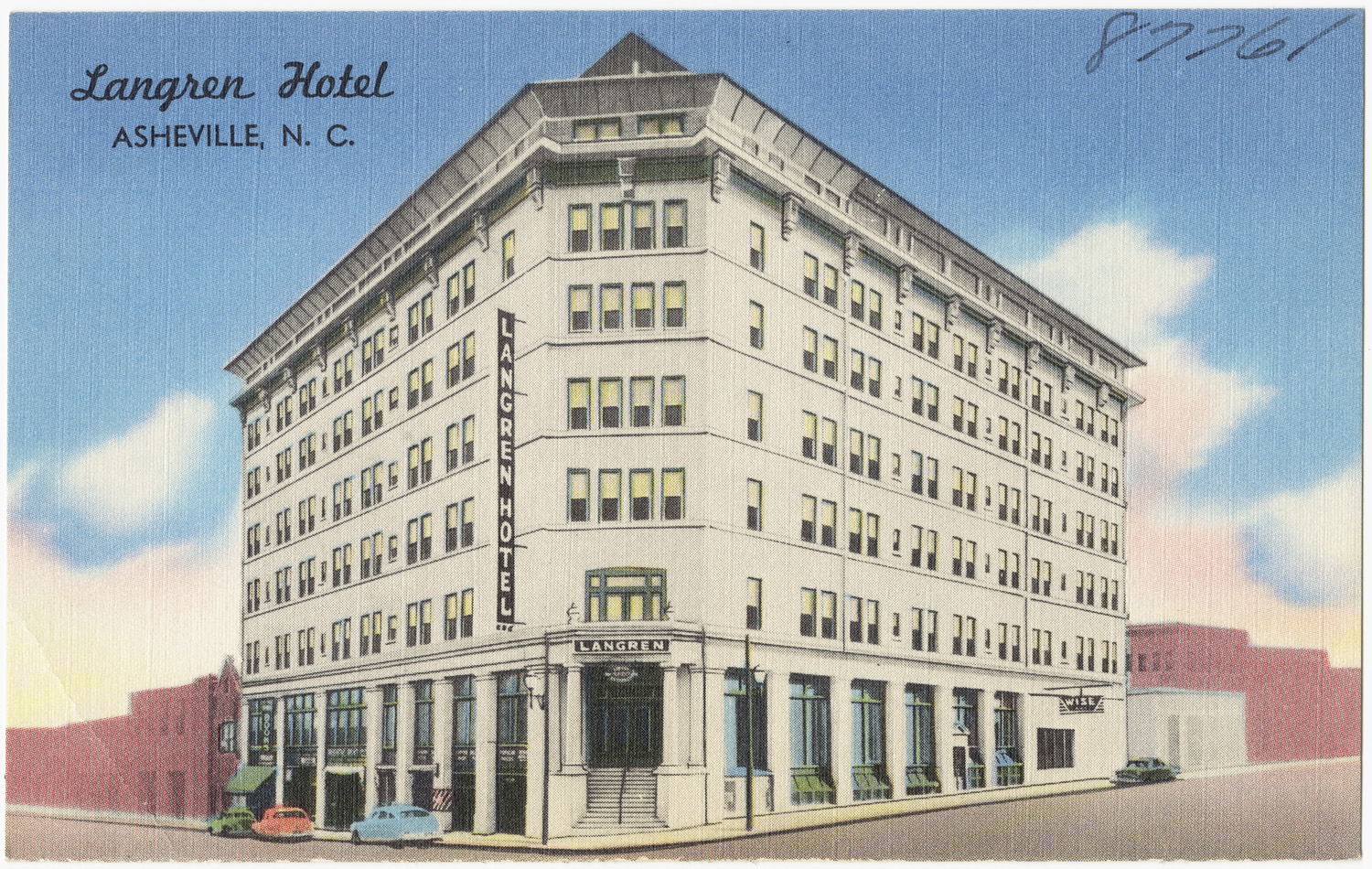
Langren Hotel, Asheville, North Carolina

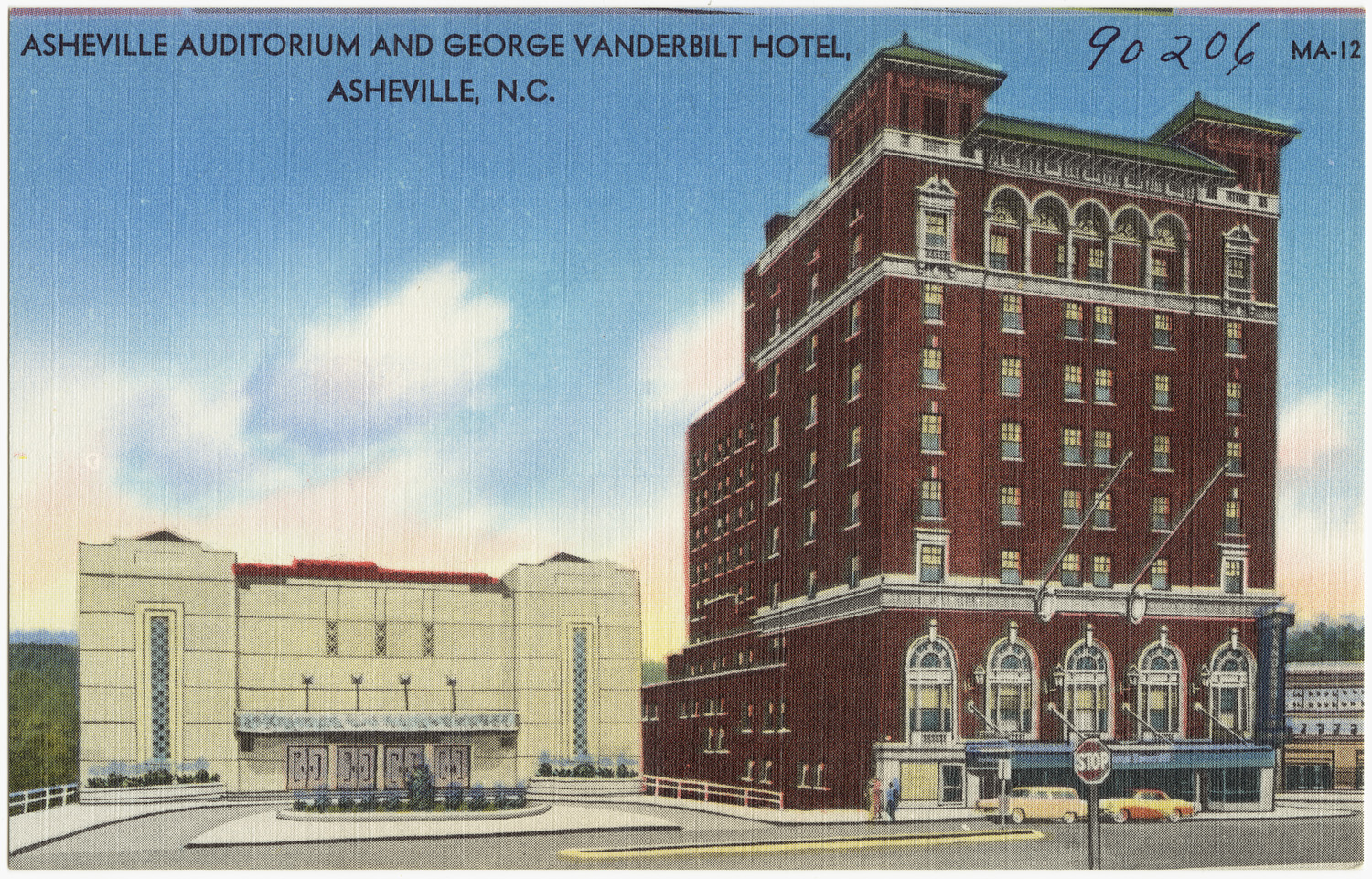
Asheville Auditorium (left), Asheville, North Carolina

In the fall of 1896, Smith established his practice in the Paragon Building in Asheville. He advertised as "R. S. Smith, Architect, Paragon Building. Eight years with the late Mr. R. M. Hunt. Six years resident architect for G. W. Vanderbilt, Esq." During his first five years in practice, 1896 to 1901, Smith received sixty commissions.

Vanderbilt continued to be a client, hiring Smith to design a manorial village outside the entrance to Biltmore. The resulting Biltmore Village included residential cottages, shops, a post office, and a hospital. With Biltmore Village, Smith developed an attractive look for the neighborhood surrounding the entrance to the estate, while also fulfilling his client's ambition to model ideal village life. Smith designed more than 24 buildings for Biltmore Village between 1900 and 1920. This includes all structures in the village except All Soul's Church, the Biltmore Estate Office, and the depot which were designed by Hunt previously; although Smith was the supervising architect for the church.

Other Projects

Vanderbilt also commissioned the Young Man's Institute (YMI) the first building Smith designed in Asheville proper. The YMI was a recreational center for Asheville's African Americans, many of whom worked for Vanderbilt, and also included space for shops and a doctor on the first floor. Smith used the same architectural styling for the YMI as the structures in Biltmore Village.

In another project for Vanderbilt, Smith designed five large rental cottages, actually mansions, across the Swannanoa River on Vernon Hill overlooking Biltmore. Sunnicrest is the only surviving cottage and was restored by its owner, Asheville-Buncombe Technical Community College, in 2016.

Smith's other early commissions were for houses and cottages in the Montford and Chestnut Hill neighborhoods of Asheville. Many of these homes have similar characteristics to those he designed for Biltmore Village. Biltmore Estate's Curator of Interpretation said, “Two beautiful examples of Richard Sharp Smith’s residential style—the Annie West House at 189 Chestnut Street in Chestnut Hill and the Charles Jordan House at 296 Montford Avenue—include pebbledash stucco, archways, and rooflines, much like his buildings in Biltmore Village.” The Preservation Society of Asheville & Buncombe County describes Smith's "true legacy to Asheville as his signature 'Biltmore-style' with its blend of English Arts and Craft styling combined with Elizabethan Tudor and Old World influences."

Smith was very protective of his designs and "imitation of his work was a source of great irritation to him." In 1897, he sued builder James M. Westall for using his designs without permission, especially exterior features. Westall had previously built houses for Smith and went out on his own, undercutting costs by eliminating the architect.

=== Smith & Carrier ===
Around 1905, Smith began working with Albert Heath Carrier (1878–1961), a Michigan-born engineer and inventor who moved to Asheville in 1884. Carrier looked after the mechanical and structural engineering aspects of their projects, freeing Smith to be creative and to pursue more clients. Smith's motto was, "We can do anything and we will." In 1910, the duo incorporated as Smith & Carrier.

Between 1900 and 1920, Smith designed almost every significant building in downtown Asheville. His additions included hotels, medical buildings, office buildings, schools, and theaters. Some key buildings that no longer survive include the Asheville Club (remodeled into the Miles Building in 1925), the City Auditorium (encapsulated by the Asheville Civic Center, now called Harrah's Cherokee Center), the Langren Hotel, the Majestic Theater, the Pack Theater, the Plaza Theater, the Oates Building, the Paragon Building, St Genevieve's of the Pines Dormitory, Vance Public School, and the YMCA. He also designed courthouses for Henderson, Jackson, Madison, and Swain Counties. Smith was a practical choice for these institutional structures; he was the first architect in the region to utilize fire-proof reinforced concrete construction.

Smith donated his services to design a monument for former North Carolina Governor Zebulon Vance as the centerpiece to Asheville's Pack Square. The 66 feet (20 m) tall Vance Monument was part of the Downtown Asheville Historic District but was demolished in 2021.

With more than thirty structures designed by Smtith, the Montford Area Historic District in Asheville has the greatest concentration of Smith's buildings outside of Biltmore Village. However, many fine examples of Smith's work can be found in Asheville's Albemarle Park, Chestnut Hill Historic District, and Grove Park. When Smith died in 1924, Smith & Carrier had designed more than 700 buildings. After Smith's death, Carrier completed some open commissions but not much more.

== Professional affiliations ==
In 1901, Smith became president of the Southeastern Architectural League. He was one of the five founding members of the North Carolina chapter of the American Institute of Architects (NC-AIA) in 1913. He was president of the NC-AIA in 1917 and vice president in 1921. In 1915, Smith became the 36th architect in North Carolina to receive a license under the new Practice Act of 1915.

== Personal ==
After moving to Asheville, Smith never returned to England. However, he "remained an English gentleman in his demeanor and appearance—tailored tweed suits, English walking caps, and cane."

Smith's second wife was Isabella Cameron, a native of Scotland. He met her when she was a member of the household staff at Biltmore. They had four children—Emily, Sylvia, Hampden, and Richard Jr. Initially, the family lived in a rental house near downtown Asheville and on Blake Street in the Montford neighborhood.

In 1902, Smith purchased 27 acres (11 ha) at the head of Chunns Cove, east of downtown Asheville, for $1,000 (equivalent to $33,823 in 2022). There, Smith built his family's rustic home, Stoneybrook, using local stone; it was completed by 1903. The Asheville Citizen-Times wrote, “The quiet forms and rustic character of the house—the home of his family—most likely exist as an expression of Smith’s personality and his family life." For several years, carriage access to Stoneybrook was limited to eight months a year due to weather and the family rented a house in Asheville for the other months. As more people moved into Chunns Cove, the road and access were improved. However, Smith loved the outdoors and was known to walk the 3 miles (4.8 km) over Beaucatcher Mountain from his house to Asheville, rather than using the family carriage or car. Stoneybrook is now on the National Register of Historic Places.

Smith served on the vestry of St. Mary’s Episcopal Church in Asheville—he designed the church's Gothic Revival style building in 1914. He was also a member of the British American Club and the Asheville Masonic Temple; he designed a building for the latter in 1913.

Smith died in 1924 at the age of 72 after several months of illness. He is buried in Riverside Cemetery in Asheville. After his death, his family continued to live in Stoneybrook despite financial challenges. Mrs. Smith sold the house to Walter Westwood in 1926, but purchased it back at auction in 1928 after Westwood defaulted on his loan. However, she sold off acreage over time, eventually selling the house again in 1932. She lived in the Chestnut Hill neighborhood of Asheville until she died in 1966.

== Selected projects ==
The following is a selected list of Smith's buildings that survive. Most are listed on the National Register of Historic Places (NRHP), are a Local Landmark (LL), or are part of a National Register Historic District (NRHD), a Main Street National Historic District (MSHD), or a National Historic Landmark District (NHL).

Project	Date	Location	City	Other contributors	Designation	References
Biltmore House	1888–1895	Biltmore Avenue	Asheville	Richard Morris Hunt	NHL	(Note: Smith was the supervising architect for this project.)
Biltmore Village Commercial Buildings	1889–1910	Brook Street and Biltmore Plaza	Asheville		NRHP	
Biltmore Village Cottages	1889–1900	18 Angle Street and 75 Hendersonville Road	Asheville		NRHP	
Eastcote	1890	Biltmore Estate	Asheville		NHL	
Gardener's Cottage	1892	Biltmore Estate	Asheville		NHL	
Young Men's Institute Building	1892	39 South Market Street	Asheville		NRHP, NRHD	
All Souls Episcopal Church	1895–1896	9 Swan Street	Asheville	Richard Morris Hunt	NRHP	
Sunnicrest	c. 1895	394 Victoria Road	Asheville			
Woodcote Stable	1895	Biltmore Estate	Asheville		NHL	
Clark Carrier House (Rockbrook House)	1895	3460 Greenville Highway	Brevard		NRHD	
Dr. H. S. Lambert House	1896	166 East Chestnut Street	Asheville		NRHD	
Woodcote Barn	c. 1896	Biltmore Estate	Asheville		NHL	
Dr. Jules Ernest David Cottage	1897	111 East Chestnut Street	Asheville		NRHD	
Dr. Jules Ernest David Cottage Lot 1	c. 1898	138 East Chestnut Street	Asheville		NRHD	
Medical Building	1898	16 College Street	Asheville		NRHD	
Woodcote Servants Quarters	1898	Biltmore Estate	Asheville		NHL	
Chanteloupnow Deerpark	c. 1899	1001 Estate Drive	Flat Rock		NRHD	(Note: This project involved adding wings and remodeling an existing structure.)
Eastcote carriage house	1899	Biltmore Estate	Asheville		NHL	
Mule Stable Cottage	1899	Biltmore Estate	Asheville		NHL	
Annie West House	1900	189 East Chestnut Street	Asheville		NRHD	
Biltmore Shoe Store	c. 1900	8 Lodge Street	Asheville		NRHP	
Charles Jordan House	c. 1900	296 Montford Avenue	Asheville		NRHD	
Citizen's Bank Building	c. 1900	Everette Street	Bryson City	Albert Carrier		
Dorland Memorial Presbyterian Church	1900	Bridge Street	Hot Springs		NRHP	
Dr. Charles S. Jordan House	c. 1900	296 Montford Avenue	Asheville		NRHD	
Dr. Jules Ernest David Cottage Lot 3	1900	130 East Chestnut Street	Asheville		NRHD	
Dr. Jules Ernest David Cottage Lot 5	1900	160 East Chestnut Street	Asheville		NRHD	
Frederick Rutledge House	1900	209 Cumberland Avenue	Asheville		NRHD	
George Tayloe Winston House	1900	2 Howland Road	Asheville	Albert Carrier	NRHD	
House	c. 1900	27 Soco Street	Asheville		NRHD	
Line Houses Number 1–8	1900	Biltmore Estate	Asheville		NHL	
E. Bruns Cottage	1901	19 Bearden Avenue	Asheville			
Biltmore Dairy	1902	Biltmore Estate	Asheville	Richard Howland Hunt	NHL	
Biltmore Forest School	1902	11250 Pisgah Highway	Pisgah Forest			
Biltmore Village Cottage District	1900–1924	Swan Street, All Souls Crescent, and Boston Way	Asheville		NRHD	(Note: This includes fourteen residences designed by Smith.)
Biltmore Village Post Office	1900	Brook Street	Asheville		NRHD	
Henry Clarke Carrier House	c. 1900	Highway 276, Dunns Rock Township	Transylvania County		NRHD	
Lambert Building	c. 1900	65–71 Biltmore Avenue	Asheville		NRHD	
Miss Maria T. Brown House	c. 1900	177 Cumberland Avenue	Asheville		NRHD	
Mrs. Lon Mitchell House	c. 1900	214 Montford Avenue	Asheville		NRHD	
Mrs. Minnie Alexander Cottage	1900	218 Patton Avenue	Asheville		NRHP	
Norton House	1900	1001 Estate Drive	Flat Rock		NRHD	
Ottis Green House	c. 1900	288 Montford Avenue	Asheville		NRHD	
Sawyer House	c. 1900	214 Montford Avenue	Asheville		NRHD	
Maria T. Brown House	before 1901	177 Cumberland Avenue	Asheville		NRHD	
H. E. Bruns House	1901	25 Bearden Avenue	Asheville			
Charles W. Brown Cottage	1902	205 Montford Avenue	Asheville	Albert Carrier	NRHD	
Dairy Barn	1902	Biltmore Estate	Asheville	Richard Howland Hunt	NHL	(Note: Building is now the Biltmore Estate Winery.)
Dairy Foreman's Cottage	1902	Biltmore Estate	Asheville		NHL	
Embrook	1902–1903	93 Embrook Lake Drive	Flat Rock		b	
First Presbyterian Church school	c. 1902	Church Street	Asheville	Albert Carrier	NRHD	(Note: This project involved designing additions to an existing structure.)
Foster Sondley House	1902, 1905	Haw Creek Road	Asheville			
Horse Barn and Stable	1902	Biltmore Estate	Asheville	Richard Howland Hunt	NHL	
Reems Creek Presbyterian Church	1902	812 Reems Creek Road	Weaverville			(Note: This building is now St. Matthew’s Anglican Church.)
William E. Breese Jr. House	1902	315 East Main Street	Brevard		NRHP, NRHD	
Henry House	c. 1903	148 West Probart Street	Brevard		LL	
J. W. Moore Cottage	1903	25 North Liberty Street	Asheville		NRHD	
James H. White House	1903	5 Hill Street	Marshall		NRHP	
John A. Campbell House	1903	255 Cumberland Avenue	Asheville		NRHD	
Stoneybrook	1903	655 Chunns Cove Road	Asheville		NRHP	
Teneriffe	1903	2531 Little River Road	Flat Rock		NRHD	(Note: This project involved the renovation of an existing structure.)
The Belvedere	1904	73 Merrimon Avenue	Asheville		NRHD	
Henderson County Courthouse	1905	1st and Main Street	Hendersonville		NRHP, NRHD	
Grace Episcopal Church	1905–1907	871 Merrimon Avenue	Asheville			
Basilica of St. Lawrence	1905–1909	97 Haywood Street	Asheville	Rafael Guastavino	NRHP, NRHD	
L. B. Rogers House	c. 1905	85 North Liberty Street	Asheville		NRHP, NRHD	
O. E. Hamilton Apartment Building	1905	130–132 Biltmore Avenue	Asheville		NRHP, NRHD	
O. E. Hamilton Apartment Building	1905	134–136 1/2 Biltmore Avenue	Asheville		NRHP	
Thomas C. Smith Jr. House	c. 1905	156 East Chestnut Street	Asheville		NRHD	(Note: This house was built on the Dr. Jules Ernest David Cottage Lot 4.)
Mark Brown House	c. 1906	144 East Chestnut Street	Asheville		NRHD	(Note: This house was built on the Dr. Jules Ernest David Cottage Lot 2.)
F. C. Bourne House	before 1907	114 Cumberland Avenue	Asheville		NRHD	
McKenzie House	before 1907	101 Cumberland Avenue	Asheville		NRHD	
Clarence Barker Memorial Hospital	1907	2–6 Reed Street	Asheville		NRHP	
Edwin. L. Gaston House	1907	Cumberland Avenue	Asheville	Albert Carrier	NRHD	
Fraternity Building	1907	36–38–42 South Broad Street	Brevard		NRHD	
Madison County Courthouse	1907	1 Main Street	Marshall	Albert Carrier	NRHP	
Bert C. Mason Cottage	1908	264 Montford Avenue	Asheville	Albert Carrier	NRHD	
Bryson City Bank	1908	16 Everett Street	Bryson City			
Edwin L. Ray House	1908	83 Hillside Street	Asheville			
Kanuga Conference Center Cottages	1908–1910	Kanuga Conference Drive	Hendersonville	Albert Carrier	NRHP	
Killarney	c. 1908	322 Killarney Street	Hendersonville		NRHD	
Pleasant Hill	1908	1168 Pleasant Hill Drive	Flat Rock		NRHD	
Swain County Courthouse	1908	101 Mitchell Street	Bryson City	Albert Carrier; Frank Pierce Milburn	NRHP	
W. M. and Mary Harrison House	1908	1 Latrobe Street	Asheville		NRHD	
Zealandia	1908–1920	1 Vance Gap Road	Asheville	Albert Carrier	NRHP	
Beaumont	1909	121 Andrew Johnstone Drive	Flat Rock		NRHD	(Note: This project involved renovating the main structure and designing an ice house.)
E. W. Grove Office	1909	324 Charlotte Street	Asheville	Albert Carrier	NRHD	
James M. Chiles House	1909	70 Gertrude Place	Asheville		NRHD	
Legal Building	1909	10 South Pack Square	Asheville	Albert Carrier	NRHD	
Thomas Lawrence House	1909	25 Lawrence Place	Asheville	Albert Carrier	NRHD	
Ardmion House (later The Sky Club)	1910	Ardmion Park, Beaumont Street	Asheville	Albert Carrier		
Argyle	1910	3110 Greenville Highway	Flat Rock		NRHD	
Hopkins Chapel A.M.E. Zion Church	1910	21 College Place	Asheville	Albert Carrier		
Misses Hawthorne Cottage	1910	208 Pearson Drive	Asheville	Albert Carrier	NRHD	
People's National Bank	c. 1910	225 North Main Street	Hendersonville	Albert Carrier	NRHD	
Technical Building	c. 1910	College Street	Asheville	Albert Carrier	NRHD	
Alva Glen Cottage	1913	104 Orchard Road	Asheville		NRHD	
Black Mountain Firehouse	1913	223 West State Street	Black Mountain		NRHD	(Note: Currently, the Swannanoa Valley Historical Museum.)
J. R. Oates House	1913	90 Gertrude Place	Asheville	Albert Carrier	NRHD	
Jack Camp House	c. 1913	10 Holmwood Street	Asheville		NRHD	
Mrs. A. F. Hall	1913	20 Watauga Street	Asheville	Albert Carrier	NRHD	
Smith-McDowell House	1913	283 Victoria Road	Asheville		NRHP	
William Johnson Jr. House	1913	2 Edwin Place	Asheville	Albert Carrier	NRHD	
Breezemont	c. 1914	150 Cherokee Road	Asheville	Albert Carrier	NRHD	
Eagles Home	1914	77 Broadway	Asheville	Albert Carrier	NRHD	
Elks Home	1914	55 Haywood Street	Asheville	Albert Carrier	NRHD	
Fraternal Order of Eagles Building	1914	73 Broadway	Asheville	Albert Carrier	NRHD	
Jackson County Courthouse II	1914	W. Main Street	Sylva	Albert Carrier	NRHP, NRHD	
St. Mary’s Episcopal Church	1914	337 Charlotte Street	Asheville	Albert Heath	NRHP, NRHD	
Asheville Masonic Temple	1915	80 Broadway	Asheville	Albert Carrier	NRHP, NRHD	
Brevard Presbyterian Church Manse	1916	116 W. Probart Street	Brevard	Albert Carrier	LL	
J. R. Bush House	1916	6 Edwin Place	Asheville	Albert Carrier	NRHD	
Locke Craig House	1916	25 Glendale Road	Asheville	Albert Carrier	NRHD	
B. H. Crosby House	before 1917	36 Watauga Avenue	Asheville		NRHD	
Gertrude Brown House	before 1917	218 Cumberland Avenue	Asheville		NRHD	
J. E. Call House (Jewell Apartments)	before 1917	175 Cumberland Avenue	Asheville		NRHD	
Dr. J. L. Adams House	before 1917	40 Watauga Avenue	Asheville		NRHD	
J. P. Hansen House	before 1917	40 Cumberland Circle	Asheville		NRHD	
Haywood Building	1917	38–58 Haywood Street	Asheville	Albert Carrier	NRHD	
Jenkins Hotel	1917	55 Haywood Street	Asheville		NRHD	
William Jennings Bryan House	1917	107 Evelyn Place	Asheville	Albert Carrier	NRHP, NRHD	
Dr. O. F. Eckel Cottage	1919	48 Coleman Avenue	Asheville			
Lt. Lawrence Laughran Memorial	c. 1919	Riverside Cemetery	Asheville		NRHD	
Methodist Episcopal Church	1919	801 South Trade Street	Matthews	Albert Carrier		
Burnham S. Colburn Residence	1920	7 Stuyvesant Road	Biltmore Forest	Albert Carrier		
E. W. Grove Apartment Building	1920–1929		Asheville	Albert Carrier	NRHD	
Lewis Funeral Home	1921	189 College Street	Asheville	Albert Carrier	NRHD	
Anderson Auditorium	1922	318 Georgia Terrace	Montreat	Albert Carrier		
Chestnut Hill Cottage	1922	16 The Circle	Asheville		NRHD	
Chipmunk Cottage	1922	18 The Circle	Asheville		NRHD	
Forest Ranger's Cottage	1922	Biltmore Estate, Racket Club Road	Biltmore Forest	Albert Carrier	NHL	
In-the-Oaks recreation wing	1922–1923	510 Vance Avenue	Black Mountain	Albert Carrier	NRHP	
Overland-Knight Building	c. 1922	205 College Street	Asheville	Albert Carrier	NRHD	
Samuel and Addie Stringfield House	c. 1922	28 Walnut Street	Waynesville	Albert Carrier	NRHD	
Twin Oaks Cottage	1922	7 Banbury Cross	Asheville	Albert Carrier	NRHD	
Warden's Cottage	1922	Biltmore Estate	Asheville	Albert Carrier	NHL	(Note: Building is now the Biltmore Estate's Deerpark restaurant.)
Foreman's Cottage	1923	Biltmore Estate	Asheville	Albert Carrier	NHL	
Loughran Building	1923	Haywood Street	Asheville	Albert Carrier	NRHD	
St. Mary's Episcopal Church Rectory	1923	337 1/2 Charlotte Street	Asheville	Albert Heath	NRHD	
McConnell Hall	1924	Mars Hill College	Marshall	Albert Carrier	NRHD	
Sylvan Theater	1927	Mill and Main Street	Sylva	Albert Carrier	NRHD	
Busbee Road Gate House	c. 1928	Biltmore Estate	Asheville	Albert Carrier	NHL	
DeVane House	c. 1940s	229 South Caldwell Street	Brevard			(Note: This house became the Moody-Connolly Funeral Home.)
