= Downtown Asheville Historic District =

Historic district in North Carolina, United States

- U.S. National Register of Historic Places
- U.S. Historic district
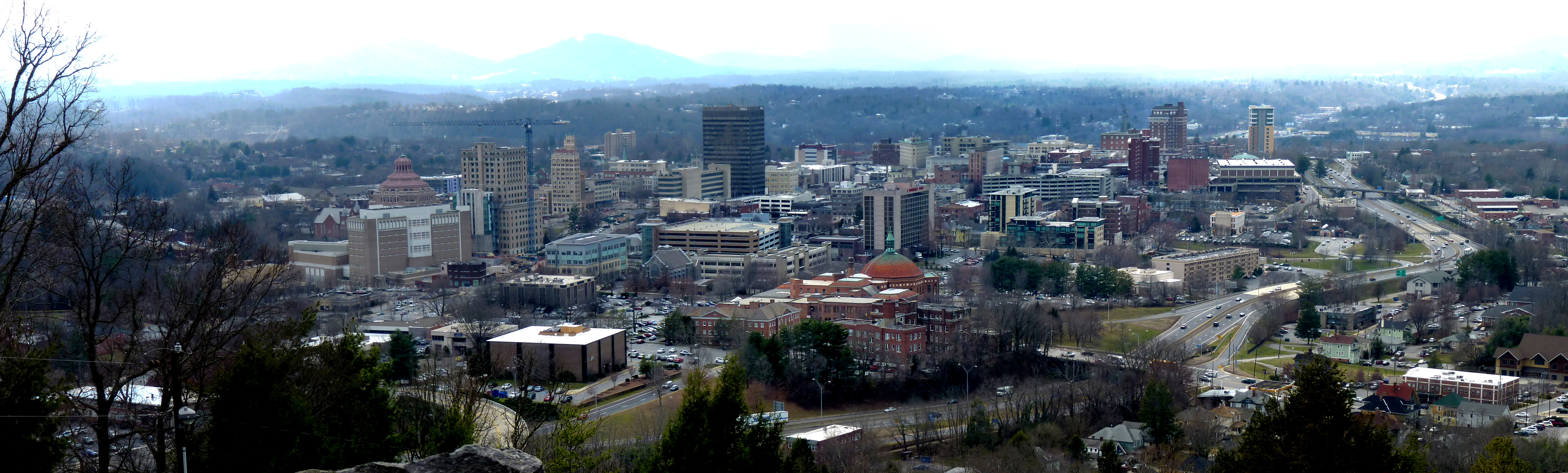
- Asheville Downtown panorama, September 2012

- Location within North Carolina Location within the United States
- Location: Roughly bounded by 1240 Valley St., Hilliard Ave., and Broad Ave.; also 60 and 64 Biltmore Ave.; also Church St. and Ravenscroft Dr.; also 76-129 Biltmore Ave., 64 Carter St., 11-23 Grove St., 14-44 N. French Broad Ave., 12-25 S. French Broad Ave.; Asheville, North Carolina
- Coordinates: 35°35′42″N 82°33′12″W
- Area: 96.35 acres (38.99 ha)
- Architect: Multiple
- Architectural style: Late 19th And Early 20th Century American Movements, Late 19th And 20th Century Revivals, Colonial Revival, Bungalow/craftsman, Queen Anne, Art Deco, Chicago, Commercial Style
- MPS: Asheville Historic and Architectural MRA
- NRHP reference No.: 79001676, 89000468 (Boundary Increase), 90001342 (Boundary Increase)
- Added to NRHP: April 26, 1979, May 25, 1989 (Boundary Increase), August 23, 1990 (Boundary Increase), December 28, 2011 (increase-and-decrease)

Downtown Asheville Historic District is a national historic district located at Asheville, Buncombe County, North Carolina. The district encompasses about 279 contributing buildings and one contributing object in the central business district of Asheville. It includes commercial, institutional, and residential buildings in a variety of popular architectural styles including Colonial Revival, Queen Anne, and Art Deco.

Located in the district and listed separately are the Asheville City Hall, Asheville Transfer and Storage Company Building, B&B Motor Company Building, Bledsoe Building, Buncombe County Courthouse, Thomas Wolfe House, Young Men's Institute Building, Ravenscroft School, Church of St. Lawrence, Battery Park Hotel, S & W Cafeteria, Sawyer Motor Company Building and the Arcade Building. Other notable buildings include the Flatiron Building (1927), Drhumor Building (1895), Sondley Building (1891), Grand Central Hotel Annex (c. 1886), Public Service Building (1929), Kress Building (1926-1927), Mount Zion Missionary Baptist Church (1919), First Church of Christ Scientist (1900-1912), U. S. Post Office and Courthouse (1929-1930), Asheville Citizen and Times Building (1938-1939), Former Bon Marche Department Store (1923), Castanea Building (1921), Loughran Building (1923), Central Methodist Church (1902-1905, 1924, 1968), Trinity Episcopal Church (1912), First Presbyterian Church (1884-1885), Eagles Home (1914), Scottish Rite Cathedral and Masonic Temple (1913), and the Jackson Building (1923-1924). Also in the district is Pack Square which featured the Vance Monument (1898) until its demolition in May 2021.

It was listed on the National Register of Historic Places in 1979, with boundary increases in 1989 and 1990. An increase / decrease occurred in 2011.

== Gallery ==
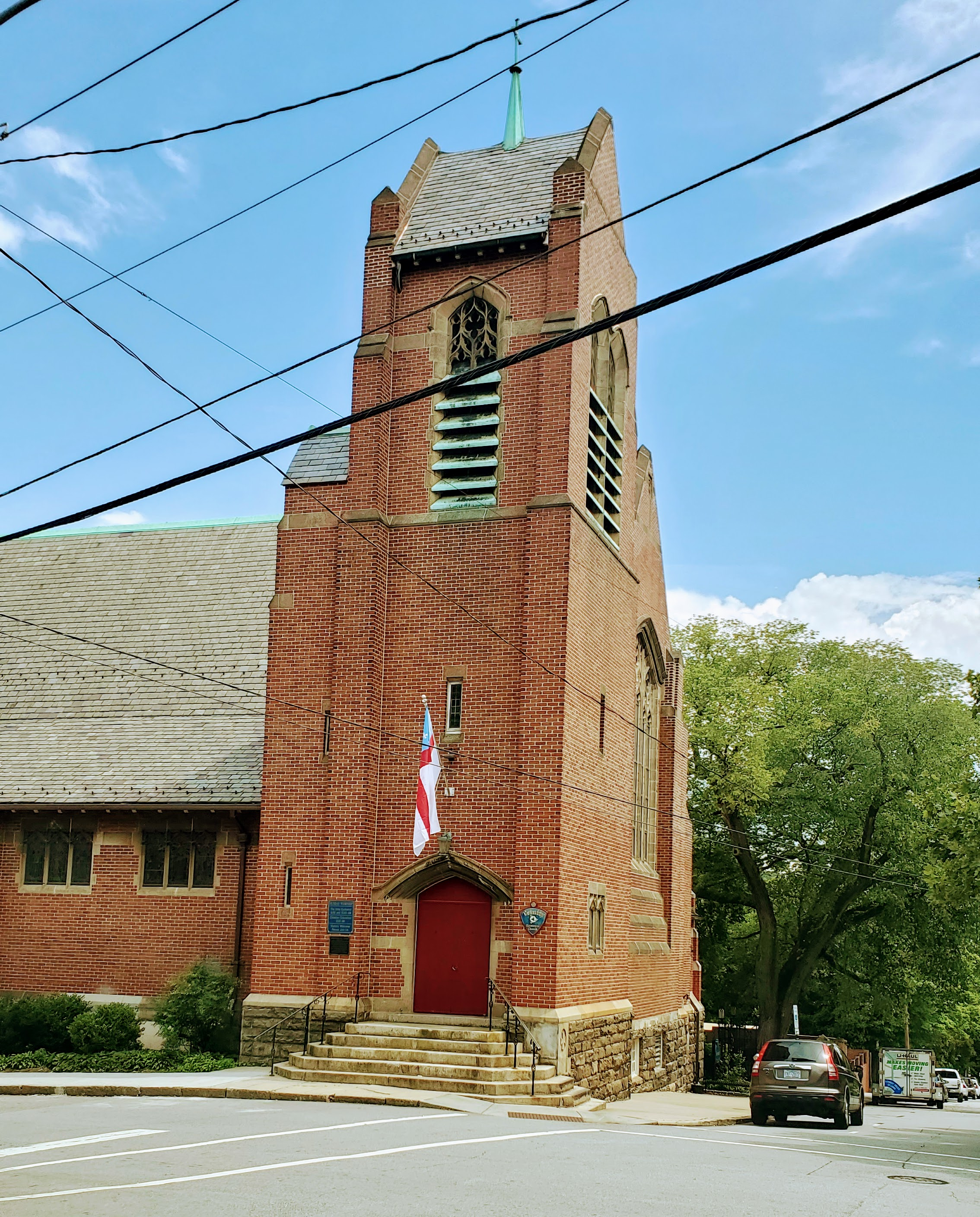
Trinity Episcopal Church, 2022

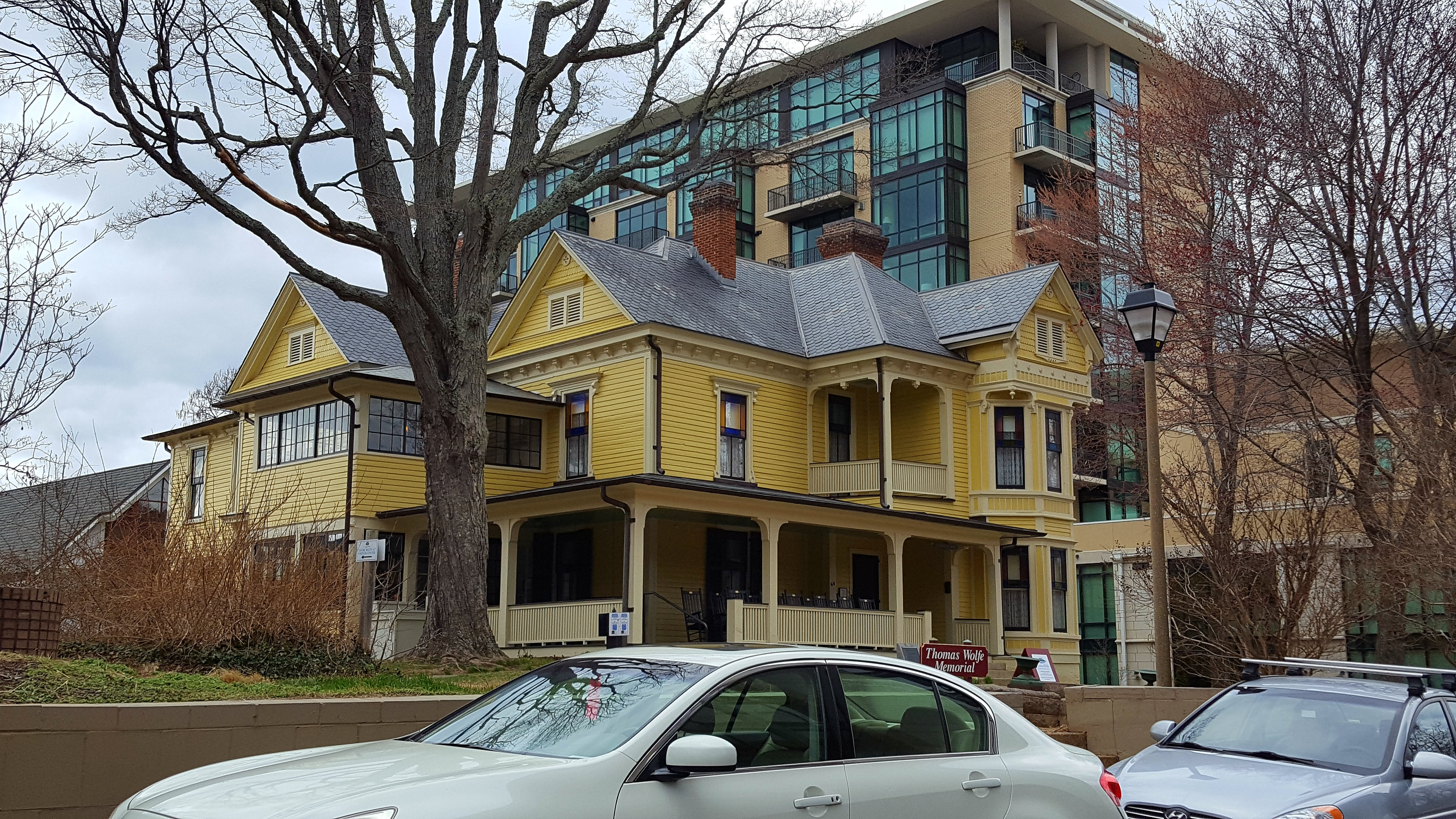
Thomas Wolfe House, 2020

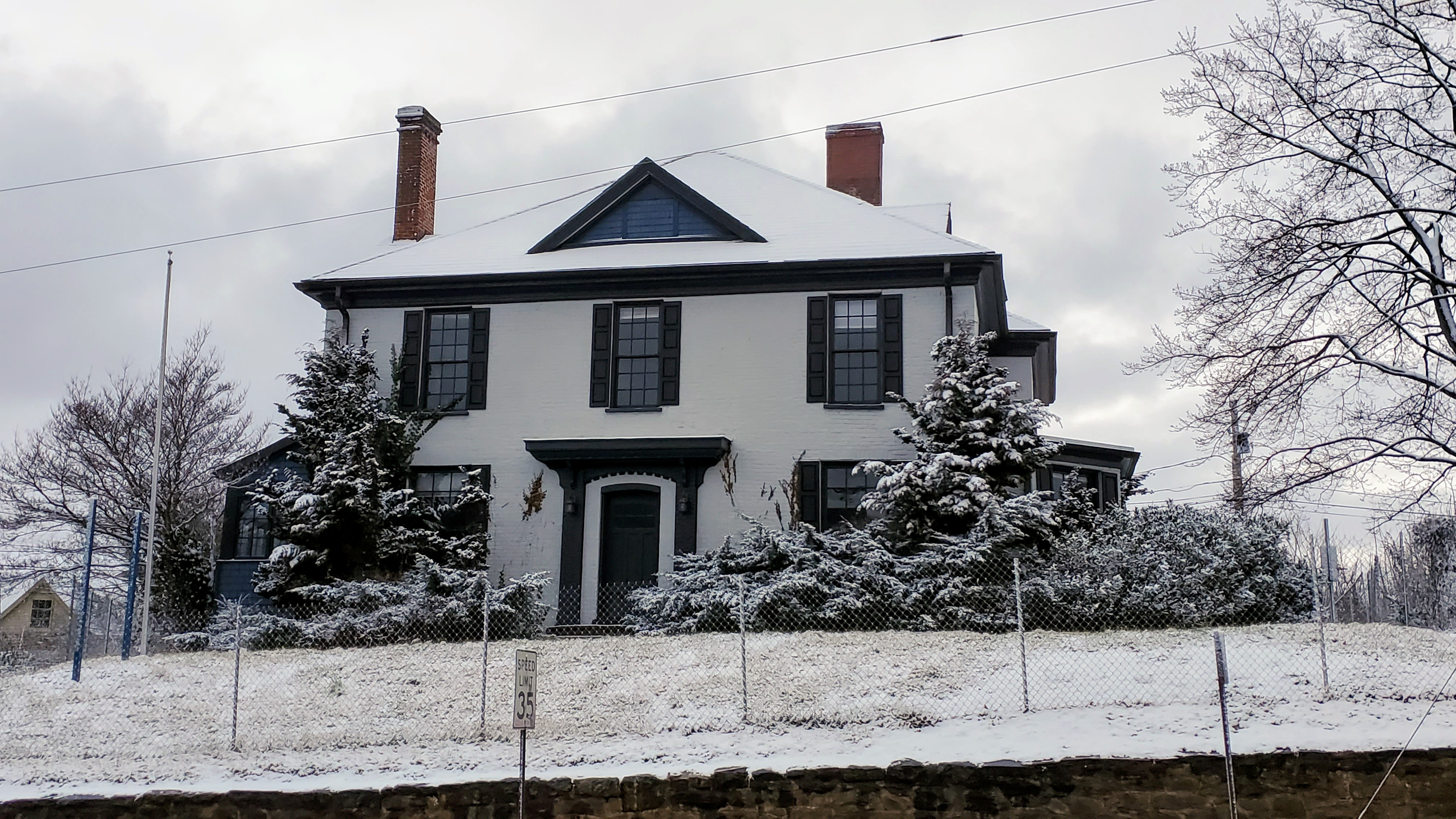
Snider-Sawyer-Leonard House, 2021

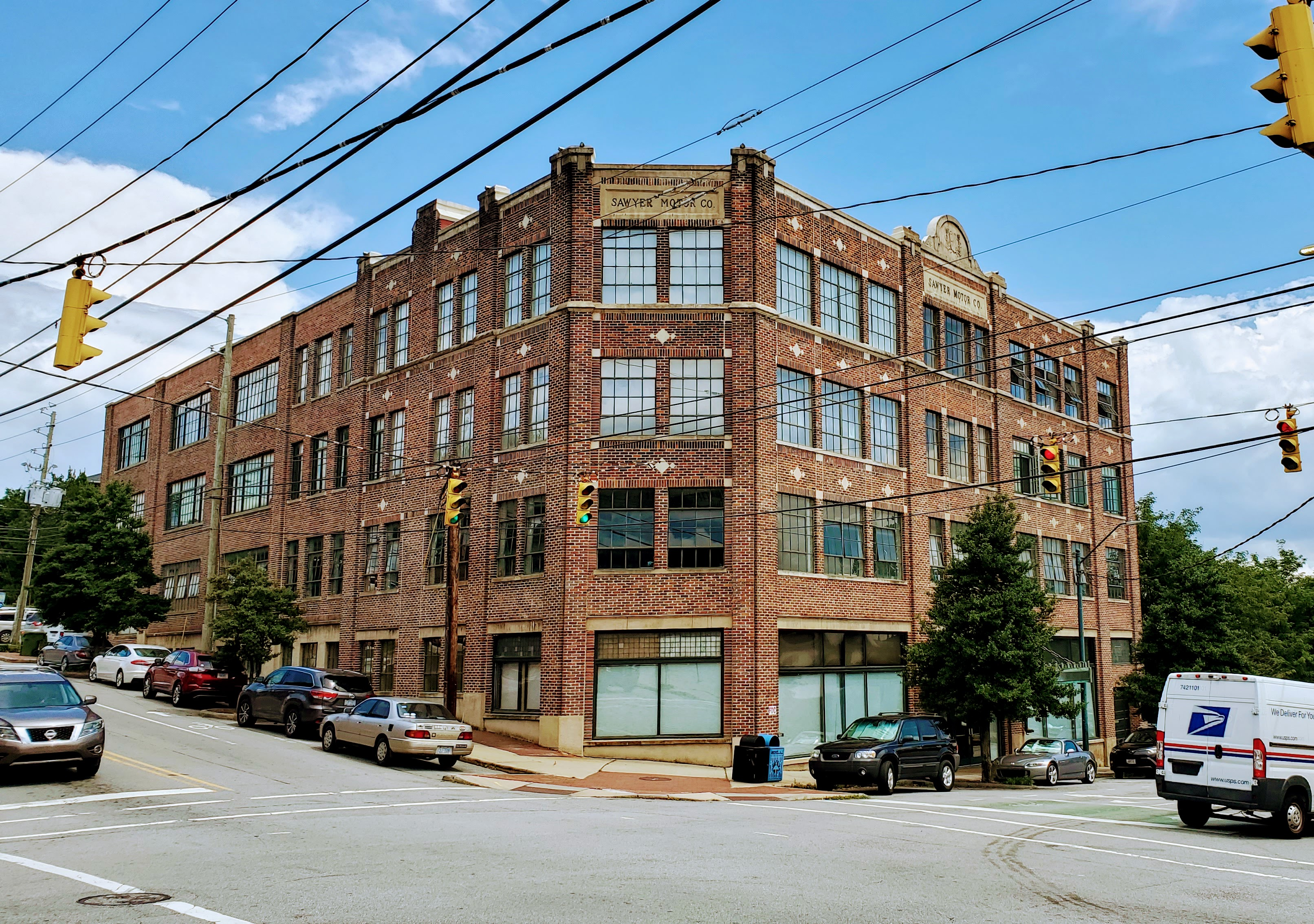
Sawyer Motor Company Building, 2021

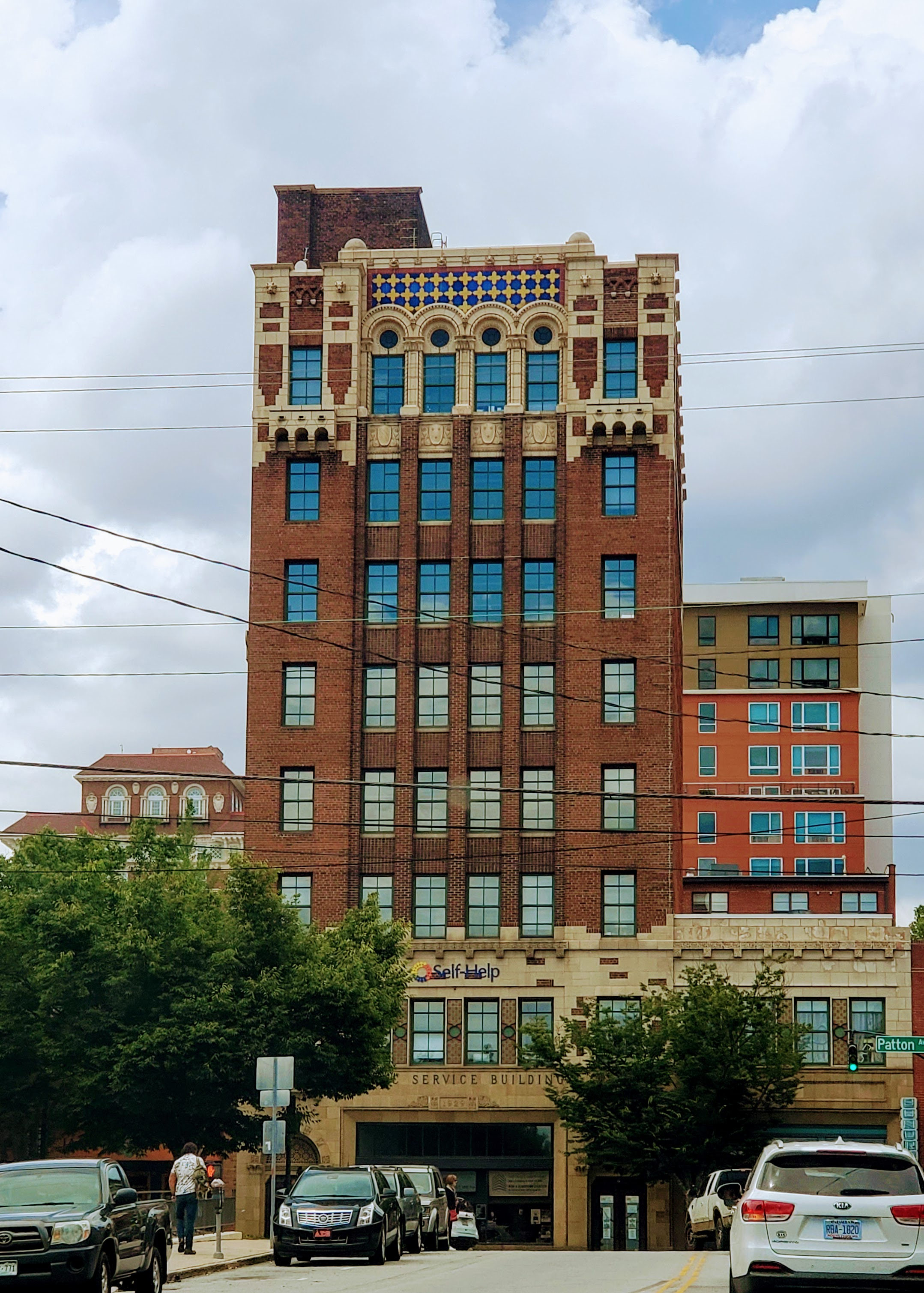
Public Service Building, 2021

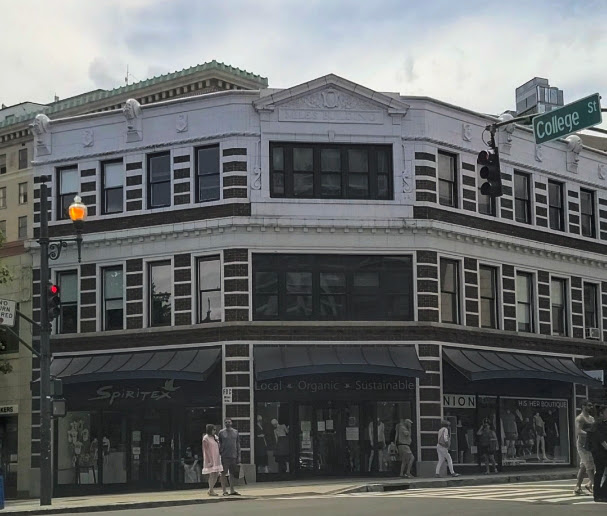
Miles Building, 2021

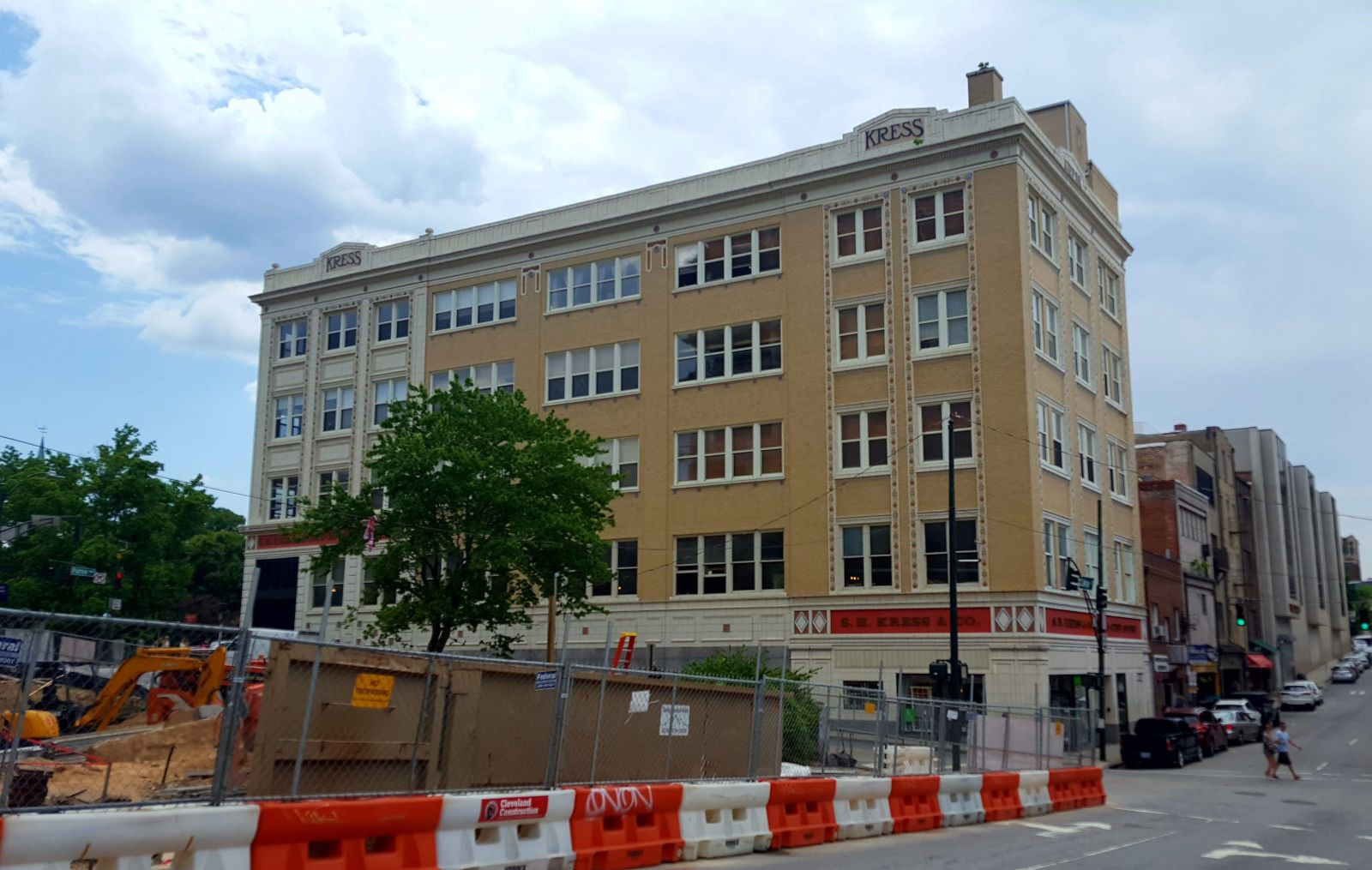
Kress Building, 2020

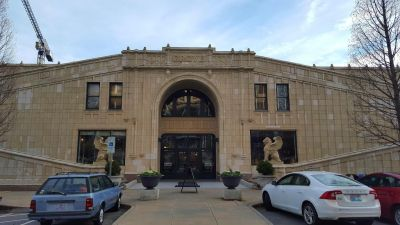
Grove Arcade, 2015

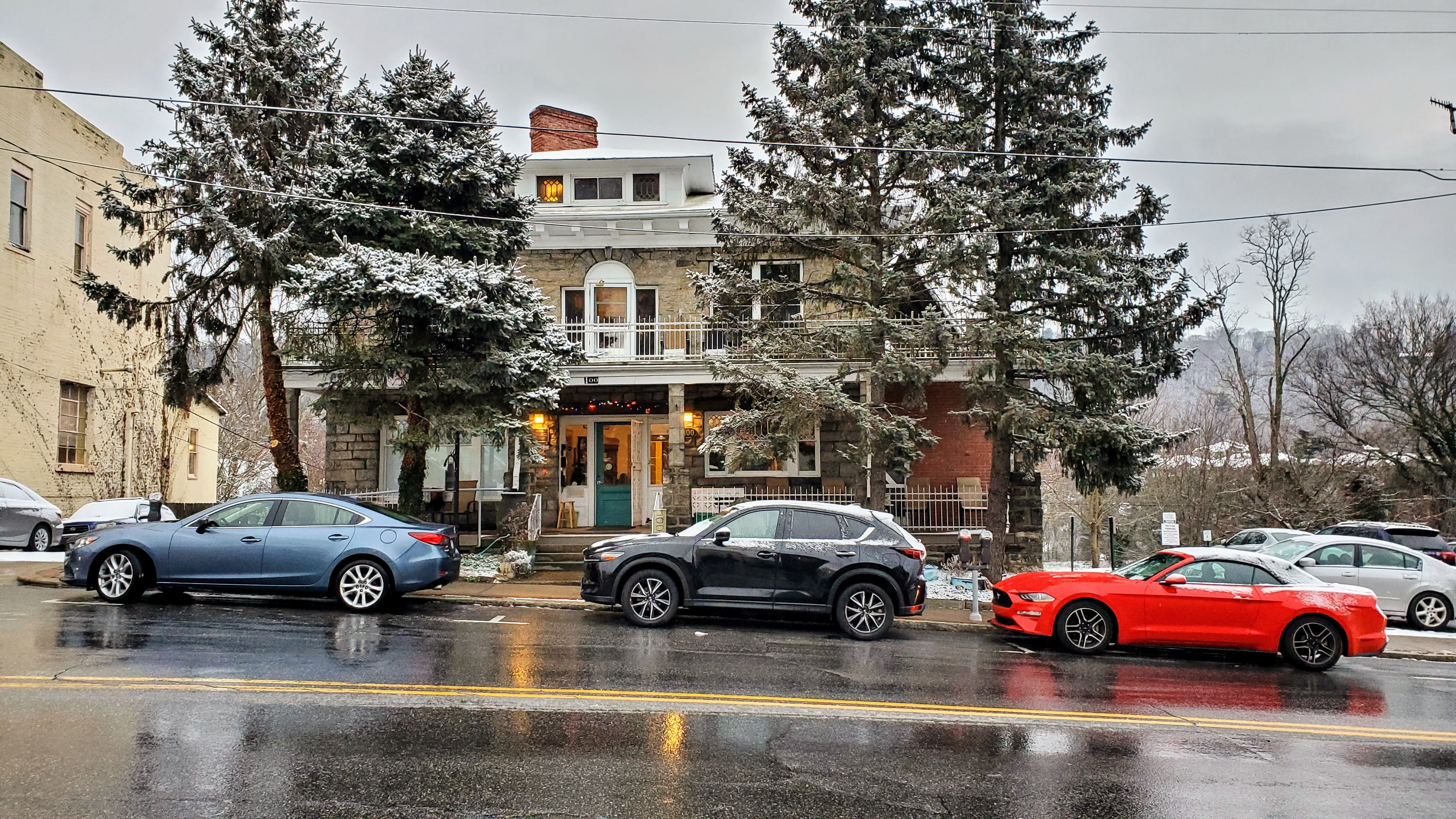
Flora Sorrell Boarding House, 2021

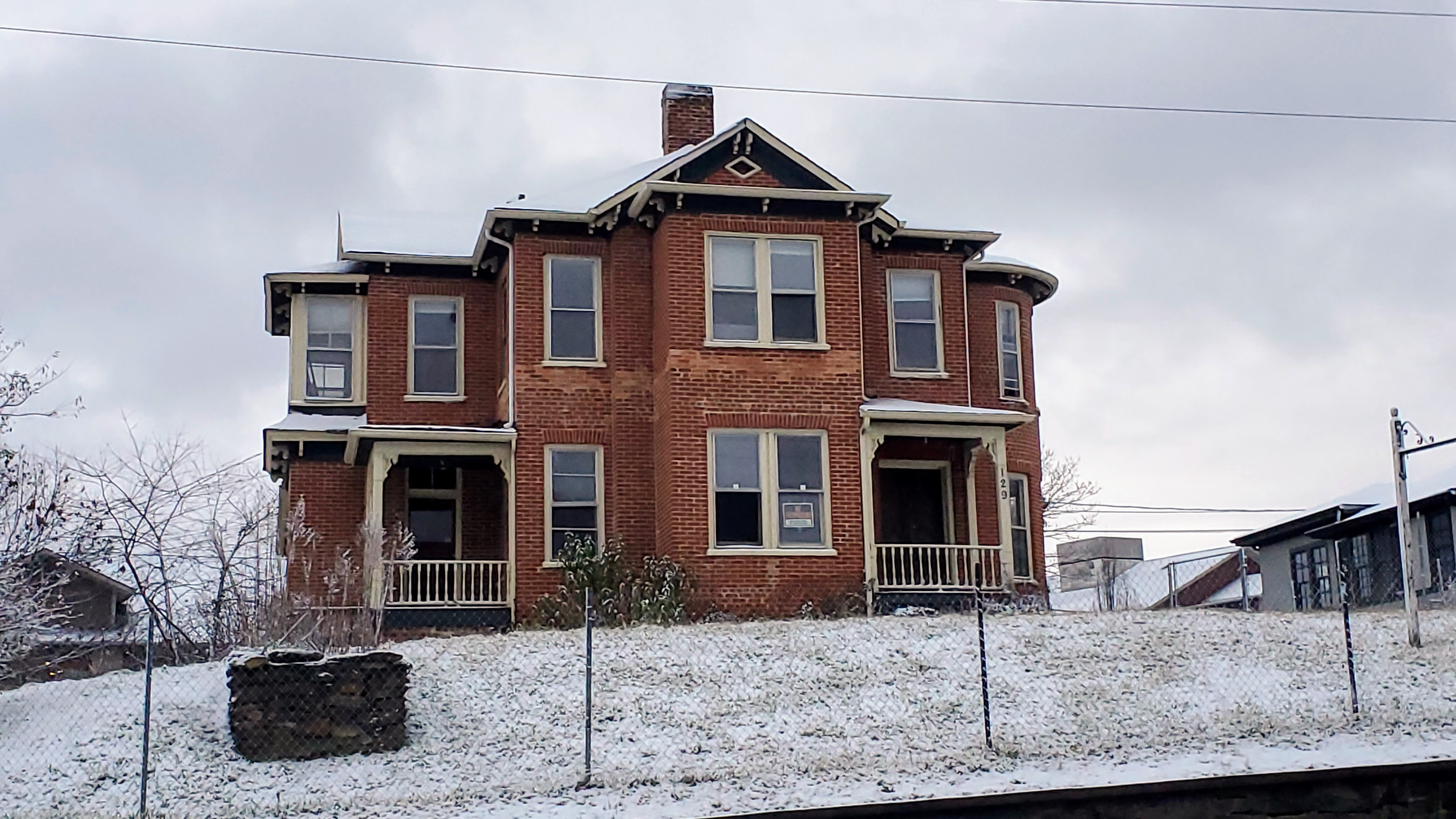
Carmichael-Leonard House, 2021

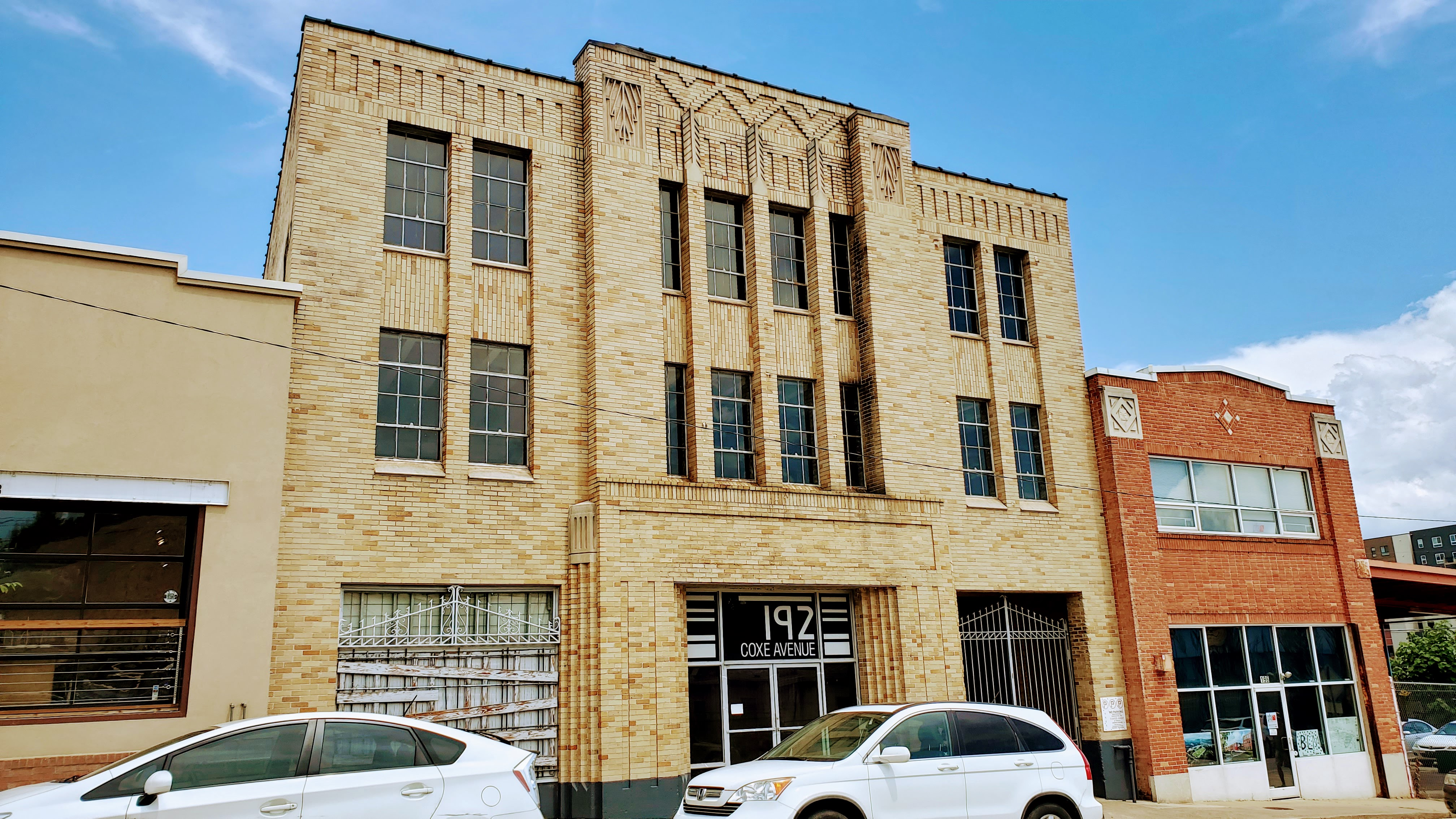
Asheville Transfer and Storage Company Building, 2021

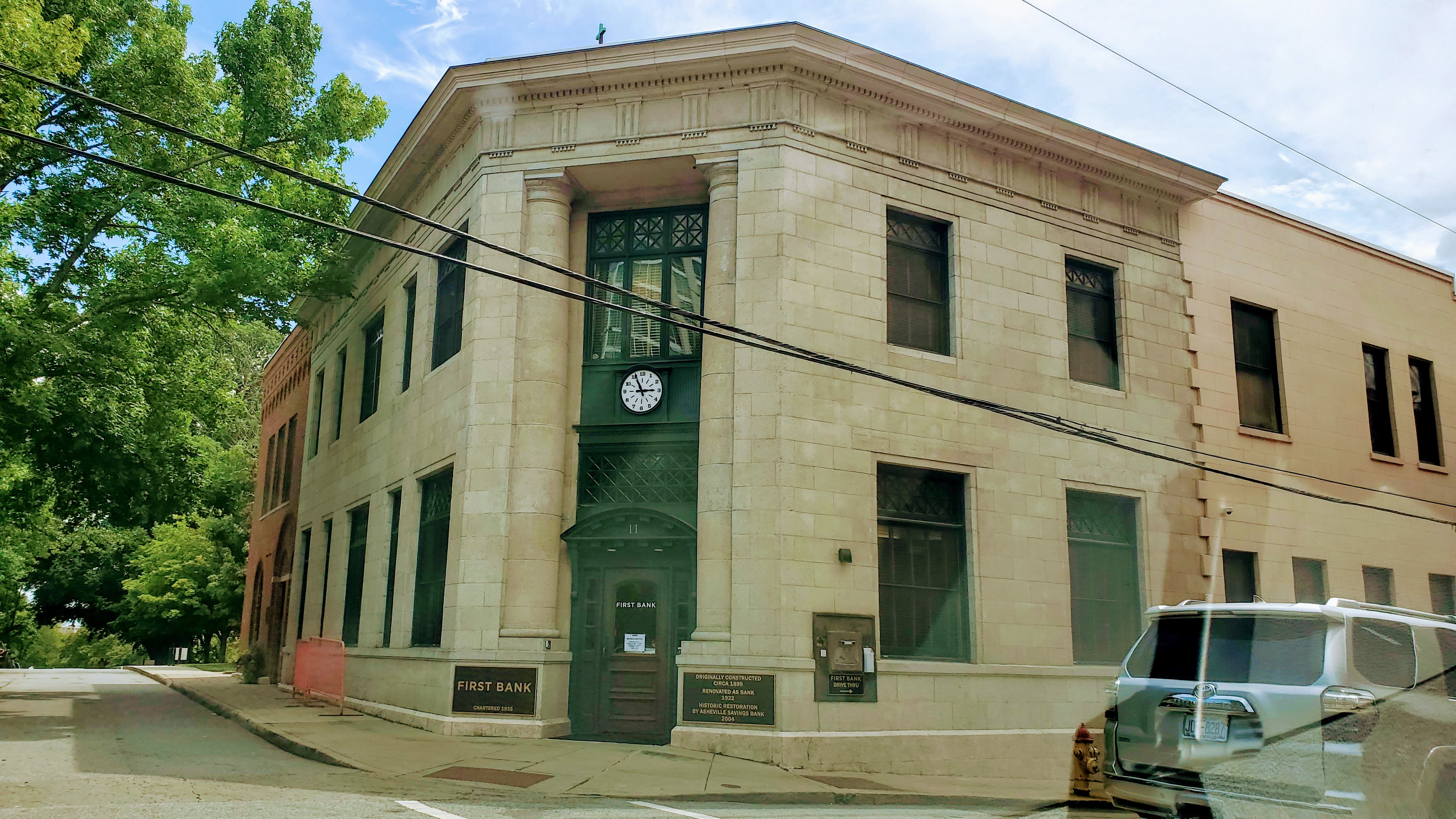
Asheville Federal Savings and Loan Association Building, 2021

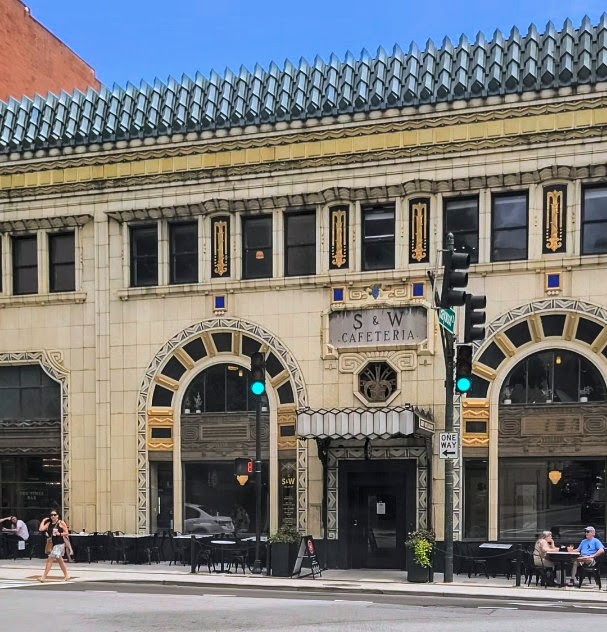
S&W Cafeteria, 2021

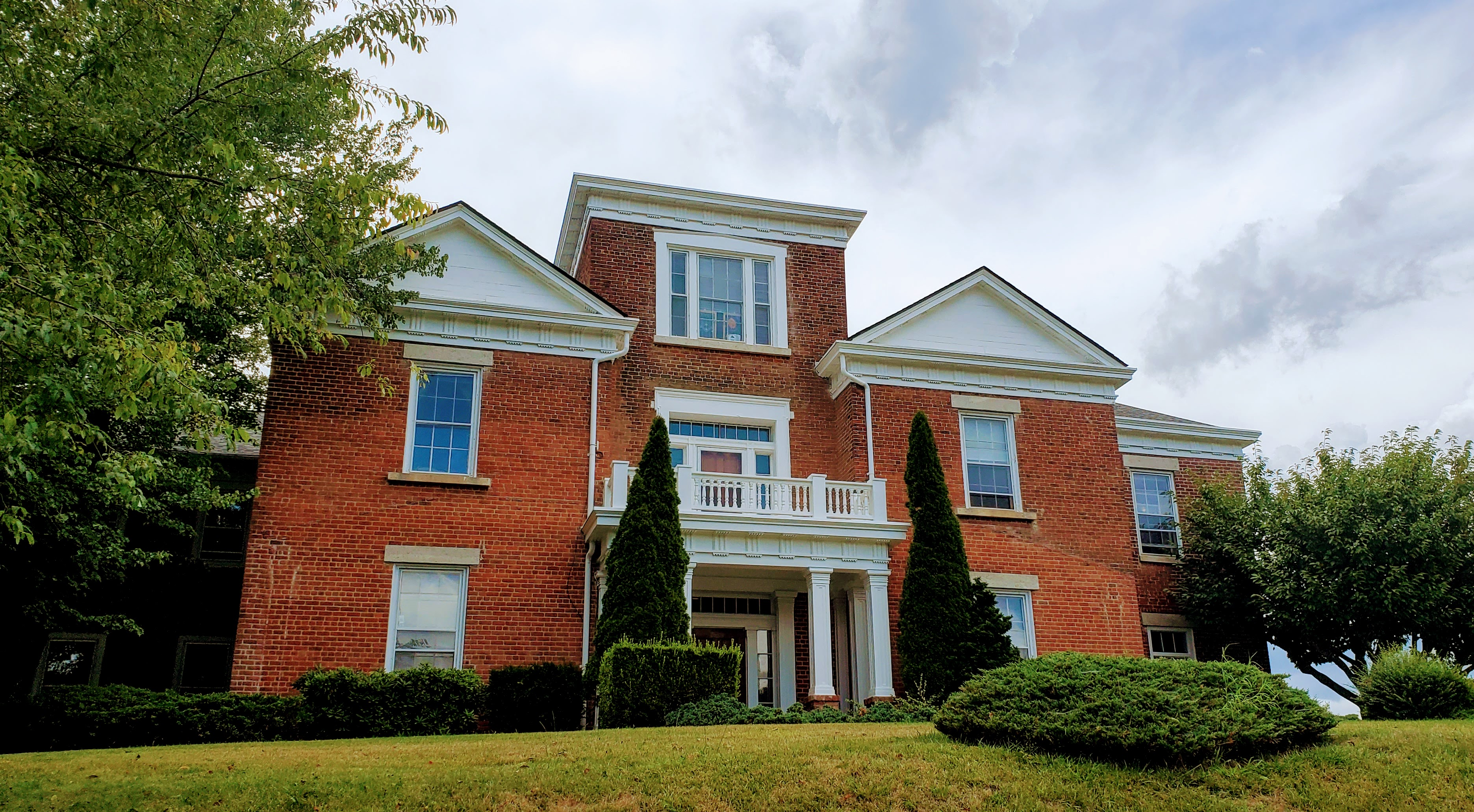
Ravencroft School, 2021

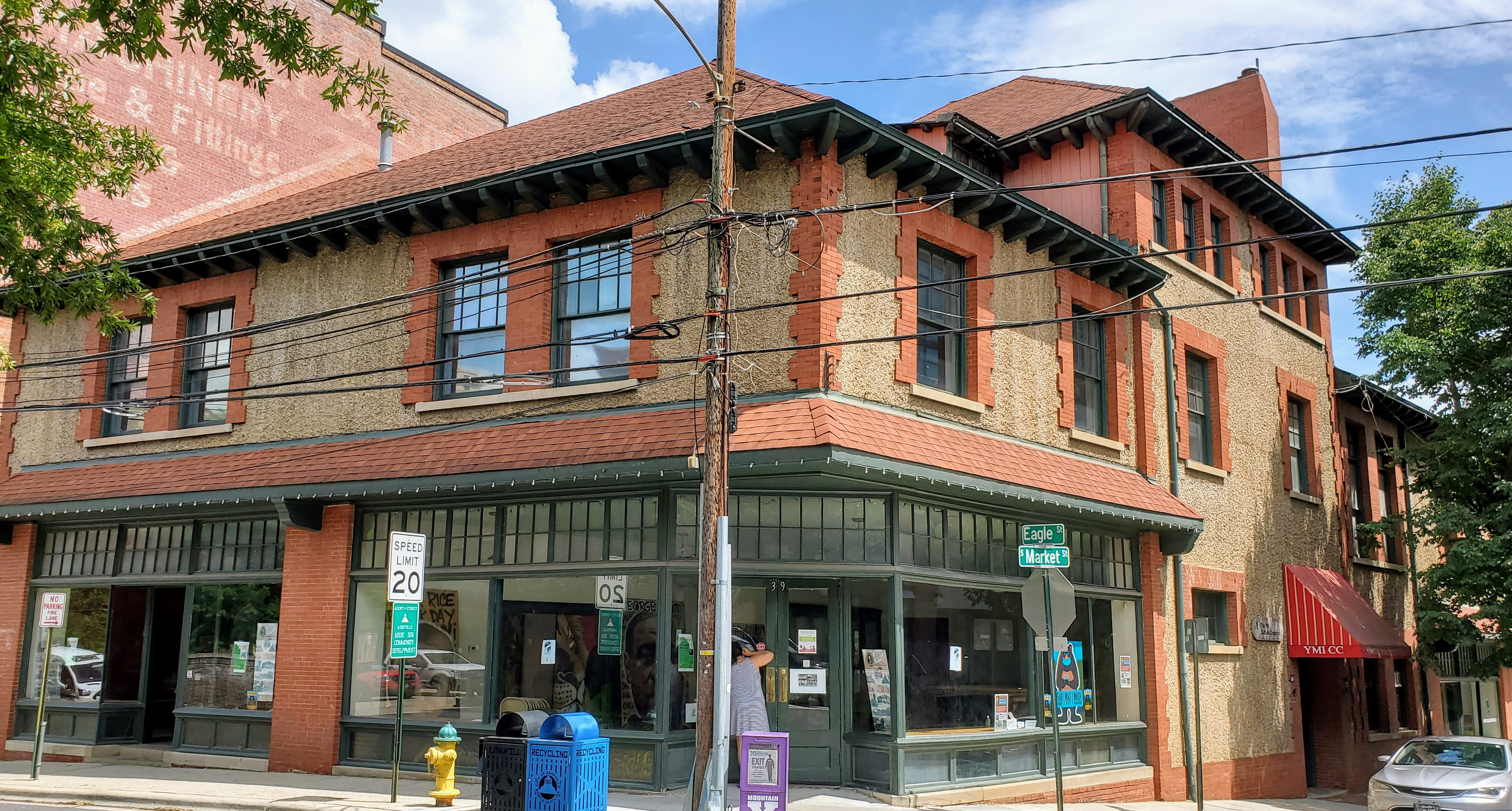
Young Men's Institute Building, 2021

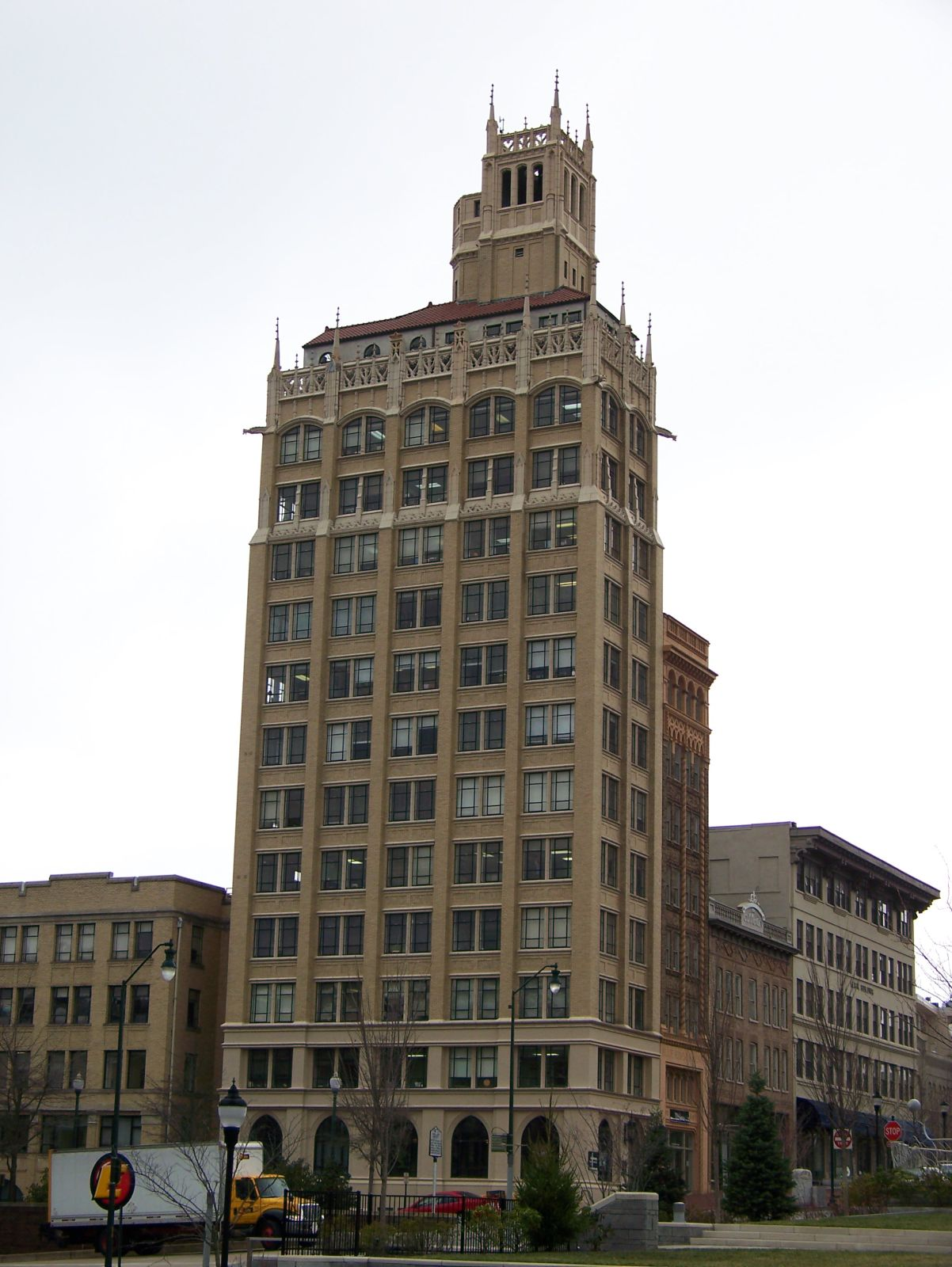
Jackson Building, 2011

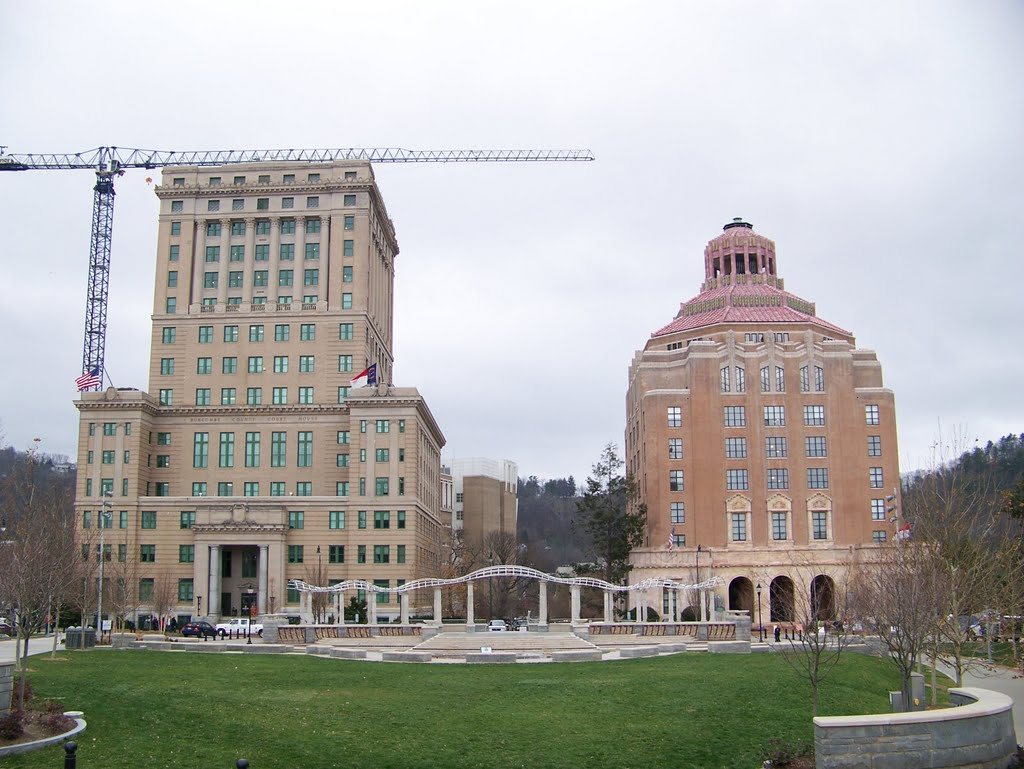
Buncombe County Courthouse & Asheville City Hall, 2012

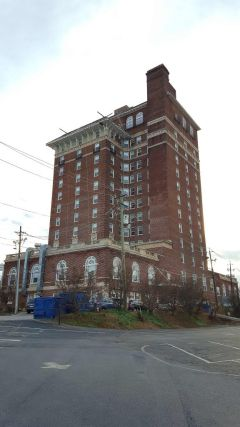
Battery Park Hotel, 2015
