= Isaac Dickson =

American civic leader (1840–1919)

Isaac Dickson (c.1840 - d.1919) was an American civic and community leader, and champion of African American education, primarily in his adopted community of Asheville, North Carolina.

== Early years ==
Dickson was born to an enslaved mother and a slave-owning father in Cleveland County, North Carolina some 24 years before the end of the American Civil War, which marked the emancipation of enslaved people in the United States. As a free man, Dickson left Cleveland County and set out for the mountains of western North Carolina, perhaps seeking business opportunity. He carried with him a letter of recommendation signed by six white Cleveland County residents, including his uncle, A.G. Peeler, and aunt, Elizabeth Dickson. After living in the town of Morganton, North Carolina for a short time, Dickson married his wife, Cordelia Reed, and they soon removed to Asheville where Dickson became involved in civic and religious organizations like the Young Men's Institute, Trinity Episcopal Church and St. Matthias Episcopal Church.

== Civic and Religious Engagement ==
After he moved to Asheville, Dickson became involved in many civic and religious institutions. His home church was Trinity Chapel, which eventually became St. Matthias Episcopal Church.
Dickson was a critical force in rallying African American voters to the polls when Asheville residents voted to create a public school system in 1887. The referendum passed by only two votes. In a show of support and gratitude for his efforts voters appointed Dickson to the Asheville City School Board, the first person of color to hold such a position in Asheville. Later, in 1892, Dickson played a key role in the founding of the Young Men's Institute, one of the first African American cultural centers of its kind in the country.

Dickson also played an important role in Asheville's African American community center where Eagle and Valley streets meet that came to be known as The Block. There he owned a grocery, coal yard and taxi service. Overall, Dickson was well known throughout the Asheville community as an active and upstanding citizen, one newspaper article citing him as the first person to pay his special boarding house tax.

== African American Education ==
Beyond encouraging support for public education by black Asheville residents and serving on the school board, Dickson made his passion for education of African Americans clear in a myriad of other ways. Before his election to the school board Dickson served as a "domestic" on the staff of Asheville's Ravenscroft School along with his wife. He also took residence on the school's campus, living in a small frame building with another family during his time there.

While Dickson was on the school board the first black school was built, what would become the iconic Catholic Hill School, Edward S. Stephens, another early organizer of the YMI was the first principal. Dickson's daughter became a teacher, and he made repeated gifts to North Carolina A&M College in Greensboro, now North Carolina A&T State University.

== Legacy ==
Today, in honor of Dickson's contributions to African American education and the public school system in Asheville, one of Asheville's six public elementary schools is named for him.
