= Ravenscroft =

Ravenscroft may refer to:

== People ==
- John Ravenscroft (disambiguation), several people
- Christopher Ravenscroft (born 1946), English actor
- Edward Ravenscroft (c. 1654–1697), English dramatist
- Edward James Ravenscroft (1816–1890), author of Pinetum Britannicum
- George Ravenscroft (1632–1683), developer of lead crystal glass in England
- Raphael Ravenscroft (1954–2014), saxophonist
- Steve Ravenscroft (born 1970), rugby player
- Thomas Ravenscroft (c. 1588–1635), English composer
- Thomas Ravenscroft (died 1681), English politician and civil war officer
- Tim Ravenscroft (born 1992), Guernsey cricketer
- Tom Ravenscroft (born 1980), British radio presenter and disc jockey.
- Thurl Ravenscroft (1914–2005), American voice actor and singer
- William Ravenscroft (1561–1628), English politician
- Ravenscroft Stewart (1845–1921), Anglican priest
- Trevor Ravenscroft (1921–1989), author of The Spear of Destiny (book)

== Characters ==
- Alistair, Margaret, and Celia Ravenscroft, characters in Agatha Christie's novel Elephants Can Remember
- Pam Ravenscroft, character from The Southern Vampire Mysteries by Charlaine Harris

== Places ==
- Ravenscroft, Tennessee
- Ravenscroft School, Raleigh, North Carolina, United States
- Ravenscroft School (Asheville, North Carolina), United States
- Ravenscroft School, Somerset, England

== Other ==
- Ravenscroft Psalter
- Ede & Ravenscroft, tailors
