= Flat Iron Building (Asheville, North Carolina) =

- U.S. Historic district – Contributing property
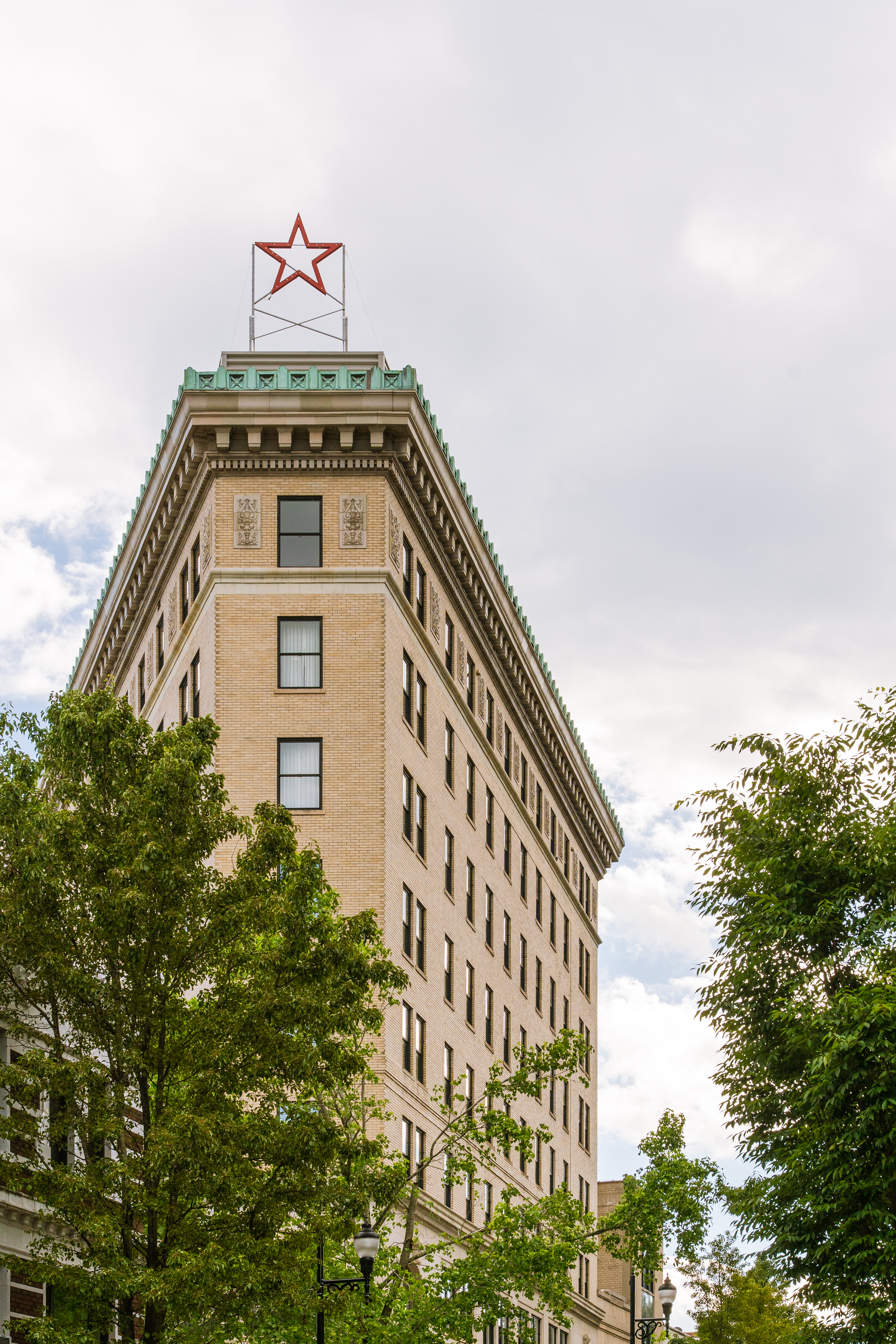

- Location within North Carolina
- Location: 20 Battery Park Avenue, Asheville, North Carolina
- Coordinates: 35.5950°N 82.5552°W
- Built: 1926
- Architect: Albert C. Wirth
- Architectural style: Beaux-Arts
- Part of: Downtown Asheville Historic District
- Designated CP: 1979

The Flat Iron Building is a nine-story 52,000-square-foot building at the junction of Battery Park Avenue and Wall Street in Asheville, North Carolina. It was announced in 1925 and took its first tenants in January 1926. The Flat Iron was designed by New York architect Albert C. Wirth and developed by L. B. Jackson, as part of Edwin W. Grove's Battery Park Hill redevelopment that also included the Grove Arcade. It is a contributing building to the Downtown Asheville Historic District.

In its first decades, the Flat Iron held dozens of businesses, as well as WWNC, Asheville's oldest radio station. Jimmie Rodgers, whose star persona and Appalachian musical style earned him the designation "Father of Country Music", made his first broadcast performance from WWNC's 8th-floor studio. The building was largely occupied by business professionals, physicians, and dentists throughout its first 50 years. As Asheville slowly recovered from its post-Great Depression slump, the Flat Iron's tenant mix turned over to more creatives, therapists, and small tech start-ups (particularly during the 2000s).

In 1997, local artist Reed Todd installed an 8-foot tall cast iron sculpture of an antique flat iron just across Wall Street, to the building's east. The sculpture has become a popular tourist landmark and backdrop for street performers.

Midtown Development Associates bought the building in 1985 for $440,000. A $1 million renovation took place at that time. Early in 2018, building manager and co-owner Russell Thomas put the building up for sale with a $16 million asking price; the buyer would be required to preserve the building. On October 8, 2018, Thomas announced the building needed $3.5 million in renovations.

Shortly thereafter, local developer Philip Woollcott presented plans to convert the building from offices to a boutique hotel. The restoration and renovation project lasted roughly five years, partly due to delays forced by the COVID-19 pandemic.

The Indigo Road Hospitality Group began accepting reservations for the 71-room Flat Iron Hotel in 2024. The hotel and restaurant officially opened on May 15, 2024. The hotel includes an Italian-Appalachian restaurant called Luminosa, a rooftop bar, an underground speakeasy, and a co-working space. The building itself has been largely preserved, with details including historic terrazzo and marble flooring, transom windows, and door signage highlighting 29 of the buildings' previous tenants.

In December 2024, a large illuminated star was affixed to the roof of the Flat Iron's apex as a symbol of hope while the city recovered from Hurricane Helene. A similar star had been fastened to the building's former radio towers in 1929 to encourage charitable giving.

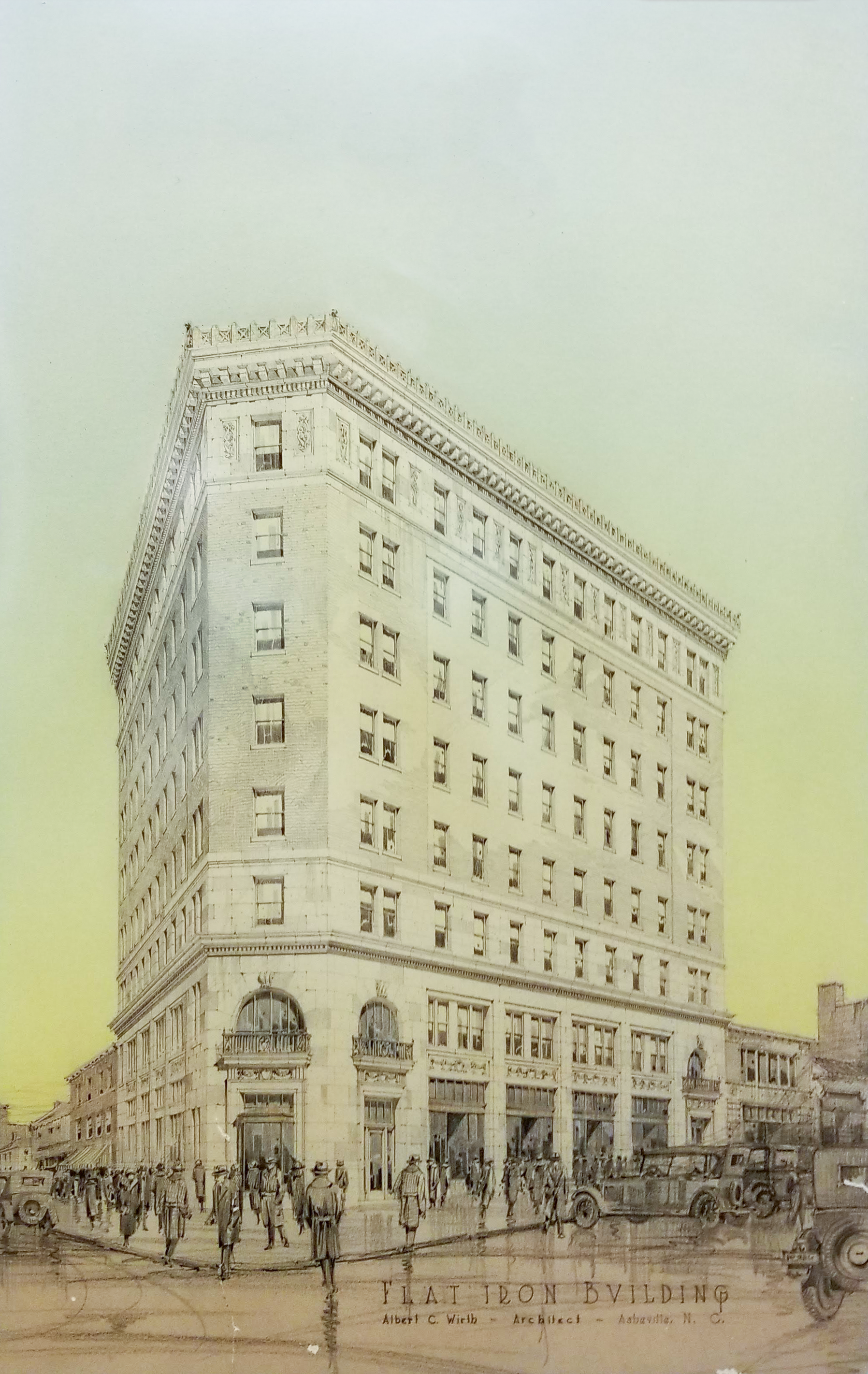
An illustration of the Flat Iron Building in Asheville, North Carolina, based on architectural designs by Albert C. Wirth in 1925.

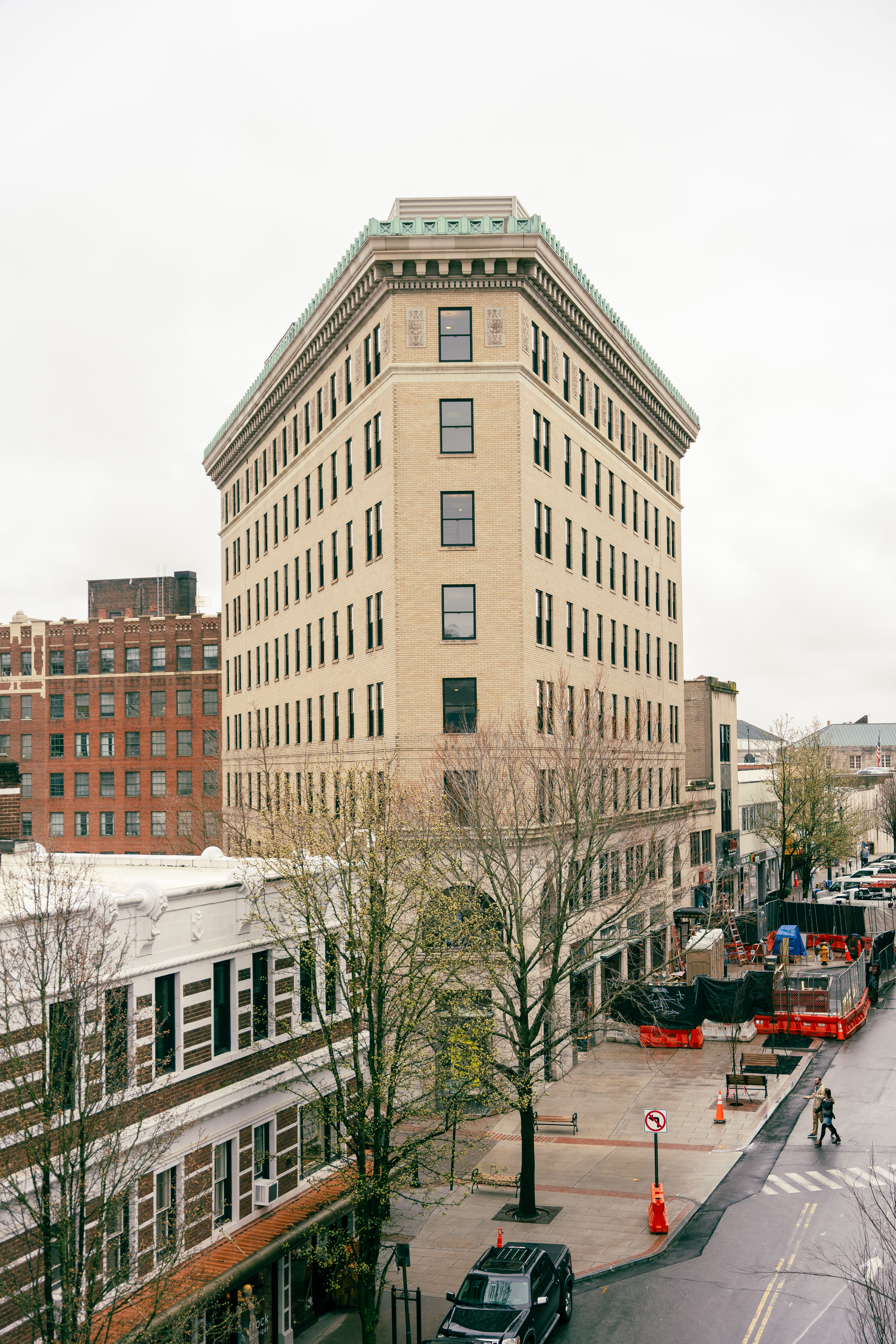
The Flat Iron Building as seen in winter from the roof of the Woolworth Walk on Haywood St.

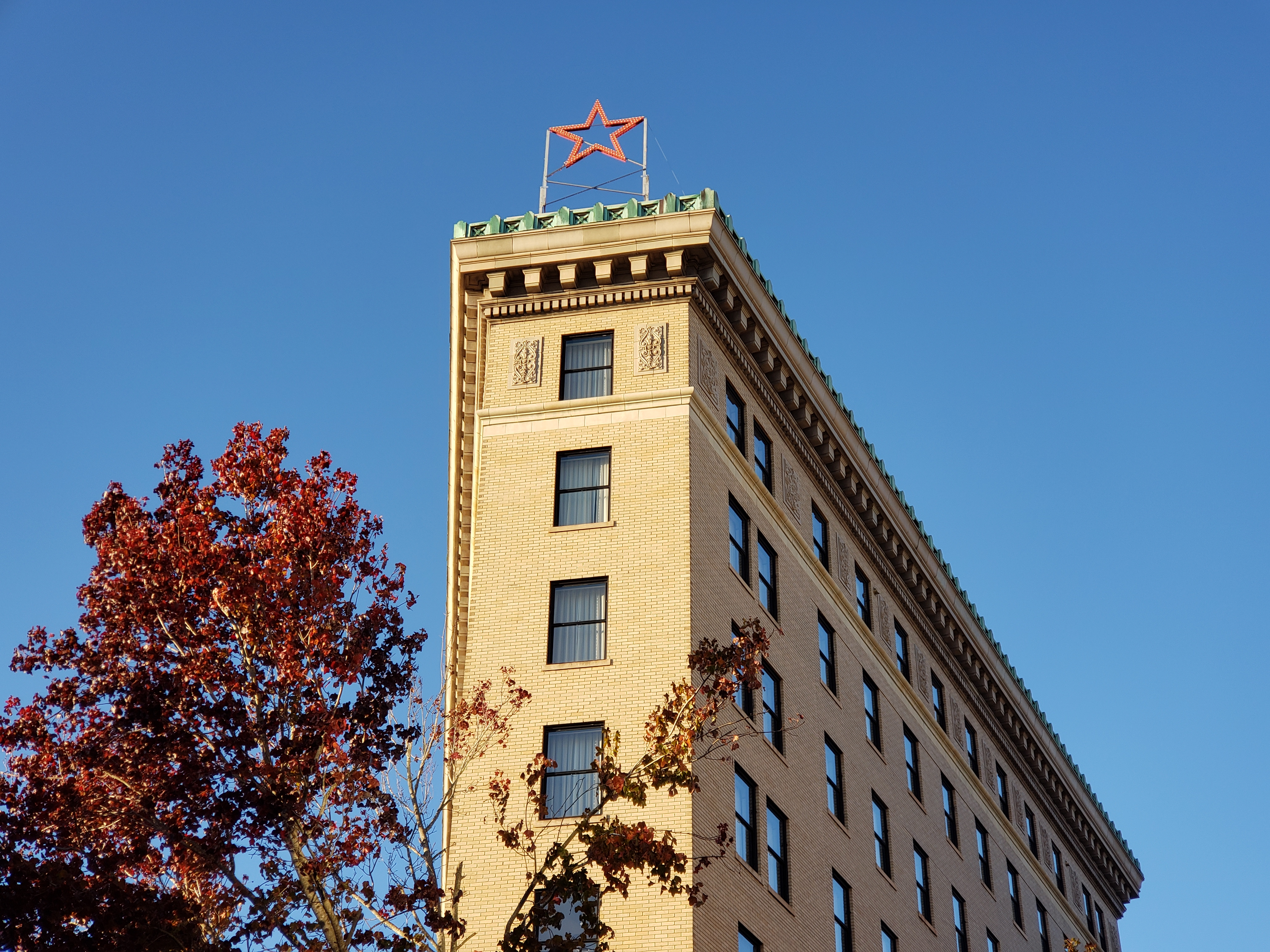
The illuminated red star on the apex of the Flat Iron Hotel, first raised for Christmas in 2024.

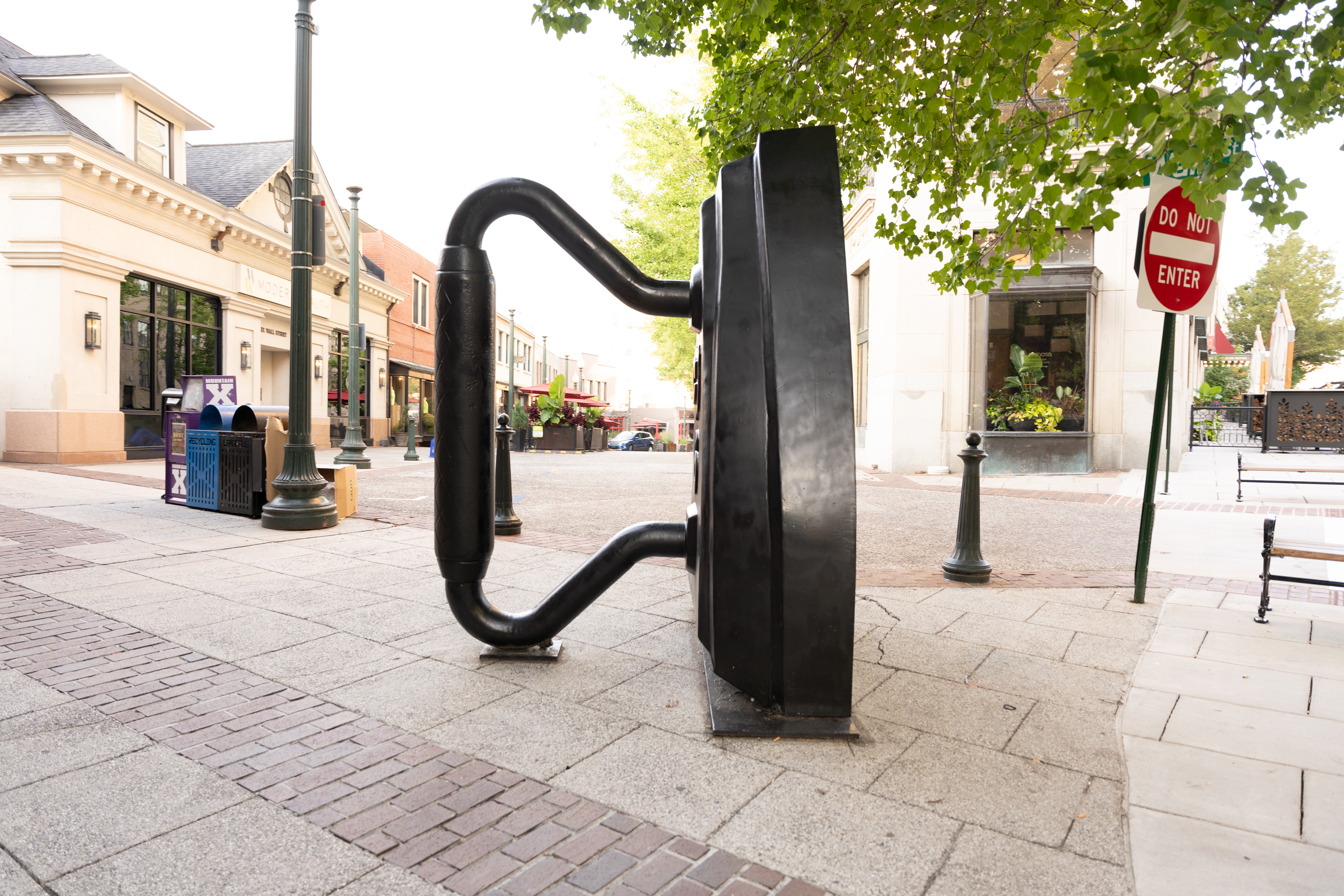
The Flat Iron sculpture by Reed Todd was inspired by the building across the street.

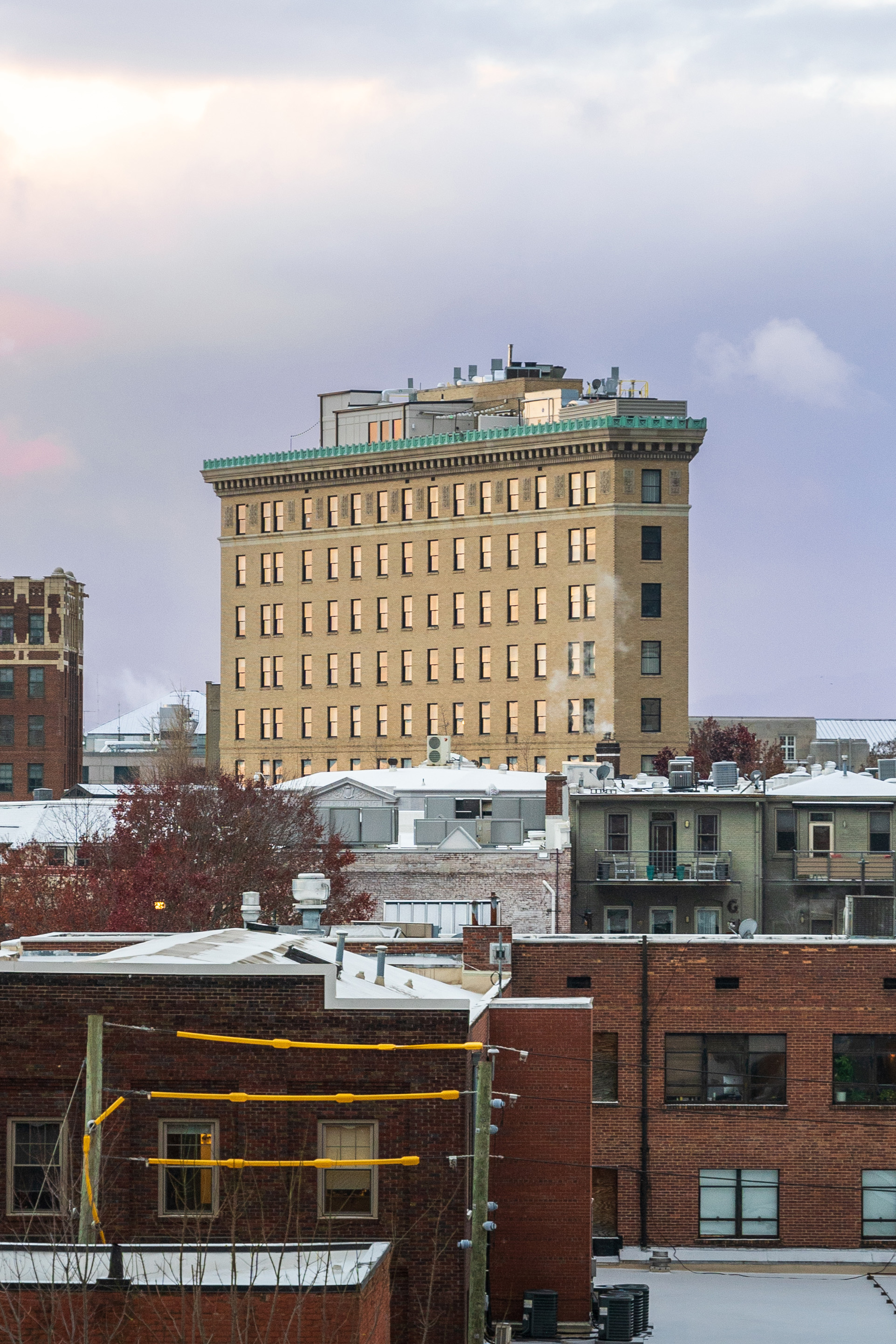
The Flat Iron Building as seen from the east
