= Young Men's Institute Building =

Historic building in North Carolina, US

- U.S. National Register of Historic Places
- U.S. Historic district – Contributing property
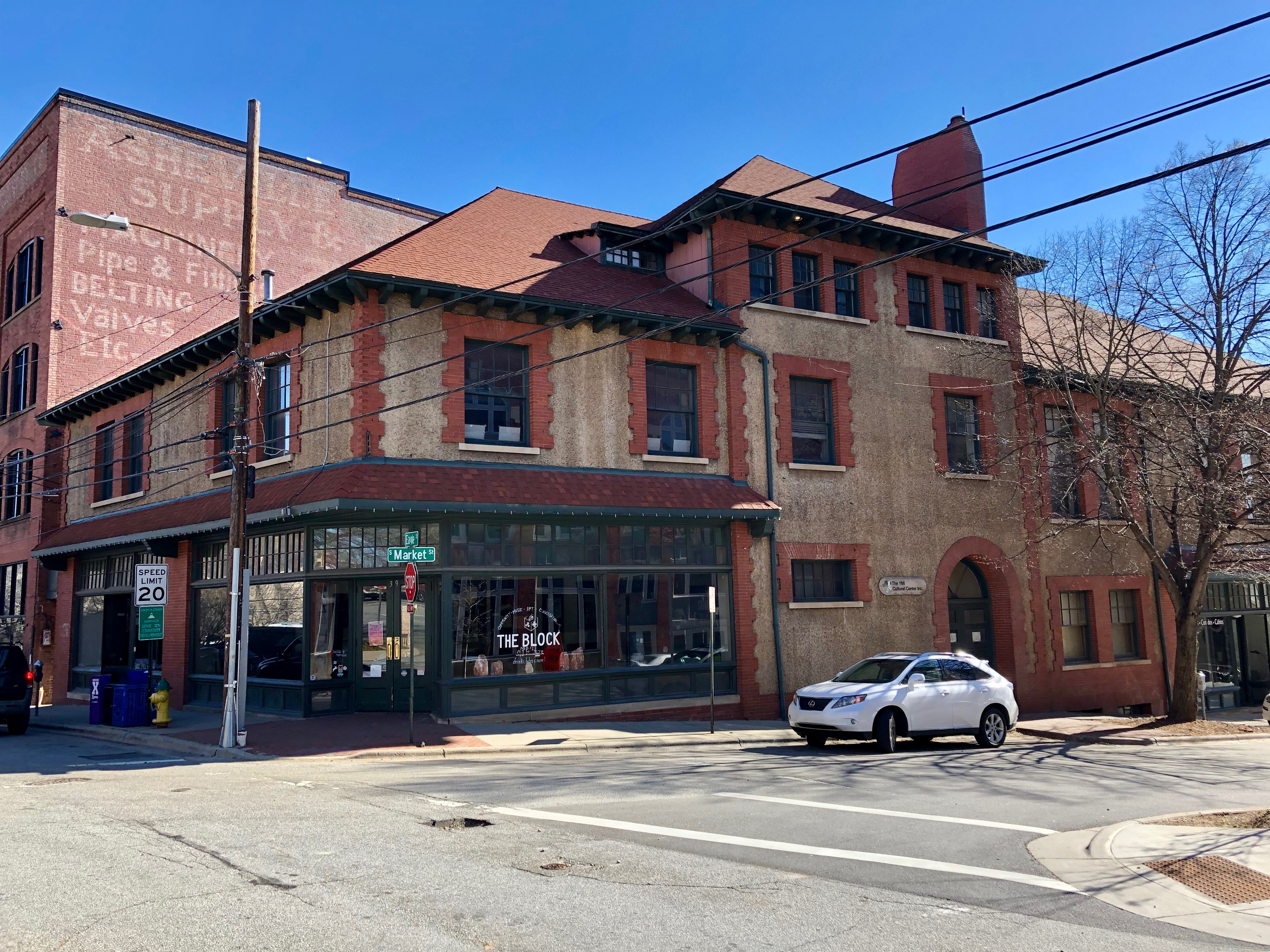
- Young Men's Institute Building, January 2019

- Location within North Carolina Location within the United States
- Location: Market and Eagle Sts., Asheville, North Carolina
- Coordinates: 35°35′38″N 82°33′1″W
- Area: less than one acre
- Built: 1892-1893
- Architect: Smith, Richard Sharp
- NRHP reference No.: 77000994
- Added to NRHP: July 14, 1977

Young Men's Institute Building, also known as the YMI Building, is a historic meeting hall located at Asheville, Buncombe County, North Carolina. It was designed by architect Richard Sharp Smith and built in 1892–1893. It is a 2 1/2-story, pebbledash coated masonry building with brick, stone, and wood accents. From its early days, the YMI building has housed shops, residence rooms, meeting rooms, and a wide variety of functions serving the African American community of Asheville. The building was restored and reestablished as the YMI Cultural Center in 1980, and now hosts a variety of intercultural programs and events. It is located in the Downtown Asheville Historic District.

== History ==
The YMI was built after African American leaders Mr. Isaac Dickson and Dr. Edward S. Stephens originally approached George Vanderbilt in 1892 to commission the building for the African American men who helped build the Biltmore Estate. While living in Asheville, Dr. Stephens was frustrated with racial discrimination he witnessed and the perception from white Asheville residents that black people were not capable of being self-reliant or assuming the responsibilities of citizenship. George Vanderbilt and his estate superintendent Charles McNamee agreed to fund the YMI and provide an opportunity for black leaders to "demonstrate their ability to learn the art of self-government." In providing funding to the YMI, Vanderbilt's goal was to test whether the YMI could achieve financial solvency, and thereby show that the black community could self-govern. Economic self sufficiency was challenging to the black community in Asheville, however, in these post-civil war years, as they faced discrimination and wage disparity in the service sector jobs available.

The YMI was designed to serve as a multipurpose space, with meeting spaces, a library and reading room, and a gymnasium. Programming in its early days included lectures by prominent African Americans, as well as musical and dramatic performances. A musical chorus and orchestra were formed early on, and YMI officials also sought to bring performers from the wider regional and national arts scene to the area, succeeding in attracting Elizabeth Davis, Joseph Douglass, and "Queen of Song" Flora Batson in 1895. Entrepreneurial activities were also supported in the space: the outside ground floor was dedicated as retail and business space for black-owned businesses. Rent from businesses was intended to defray expenses, contribute to payment of the loan from the building's construction, and make the YMI financially self-sustaining.

In June 1906, the YMI's Board of Directors purchased the building from the Vanderbilt Estate for $10,000. The YMI continued to flourish during the period of segregation, but suffered decline in use during the 1960s and 1970s. In 1980, a coalition of nine black churches purchased the building and reestablished it as the YMI Cultural Center.

The building has been listed on the National Register of Historic Places since 1977.

== Current use ==
The YMI Cultural Center continues both to provide a home for local businesses and to host a variety of cultural programs and exhibitions of art and artifacts in order to preserve the heritage of African Americans in Buncombe County. Permanent exhibitions feature African masks and sculpture, drawings by the African-American artist Charles W. White, and a photographs that highlight the history of the YMI and its ties to the building and history of Biltmore Estate.
