= Kansas Technical Institute (Topeka) =

Defunct black college in Topeka, Kansas, U.S.

- Former names: Kansas Industrial and Educational Institute (1895–1923); Kansas Vocational School (1923–1951)
- Type: Public, historically black
- Active: 1895–1955
- Location: Topeka, Kansas, U.S.
- Colors: Purple and gold
- Nickname: Buffaloes

Kansas Technical Institute (KTI) was a public historically black college located in Topeka, Kansas, United States. It was founded in 1895, as Kansas Industrial and Educational Institute (KIEI), by Edward S. Stephens and Elizabeth Riddick. The college's name was changed to Kansas Vocational School (KVS) in 1923 and then to Kansas Technical Institute in 1951. The school closed in 1955.

Kansas Technical Institute's sports teams were known as the Buffaloes. The school's colors were purple and gold.
