= Asheville Transfer and Storage Company Building =

Historic warehouse in North Carolina, US

- U.S. National Register of Historic Places
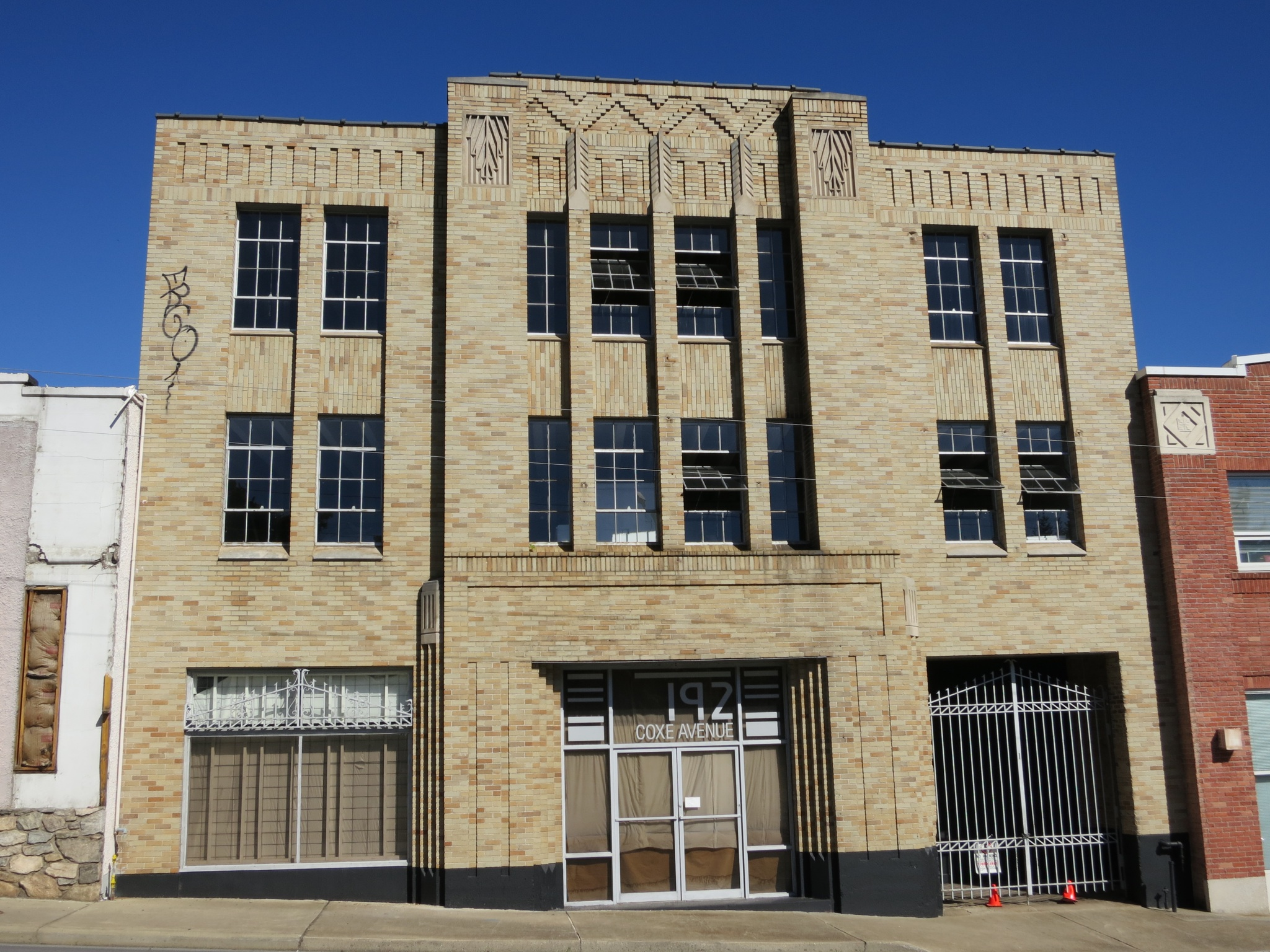
- Asheville Transfer and Storage Company Building, September 2012

- Location within North Carolina Location within the United States
- Location: 192-194 Coxe Ave., Asheville, North Carolina
- Coordinates: 35°35′14″N 82°33′16″W
- Area: less than one acre
- Built: 1929
- Architect: Breeze, V.W.
- Architectural style: Art Deco
- MPS: Asheville Historic and Architectural MRA
- NRHP reference No.: 79001665
- Added to NRHP: April 26, 1979

Asheville Transfer and Storage Company Building is a historic warehouse located at Asheville, Buncombe County, North Carolina. It was built in 1929, and is a three-story, eight-bay, Art Deco-style reinforced concrete building. It features receding stepped brick panels on either side of the main entrance and a patterned brick parapet.

It was listed on the National Register of Historic Places in 1979.
