= Sawyer Motor Company Building =

Historic building in North Carolina, US

- U.S. National Register of Historic Places
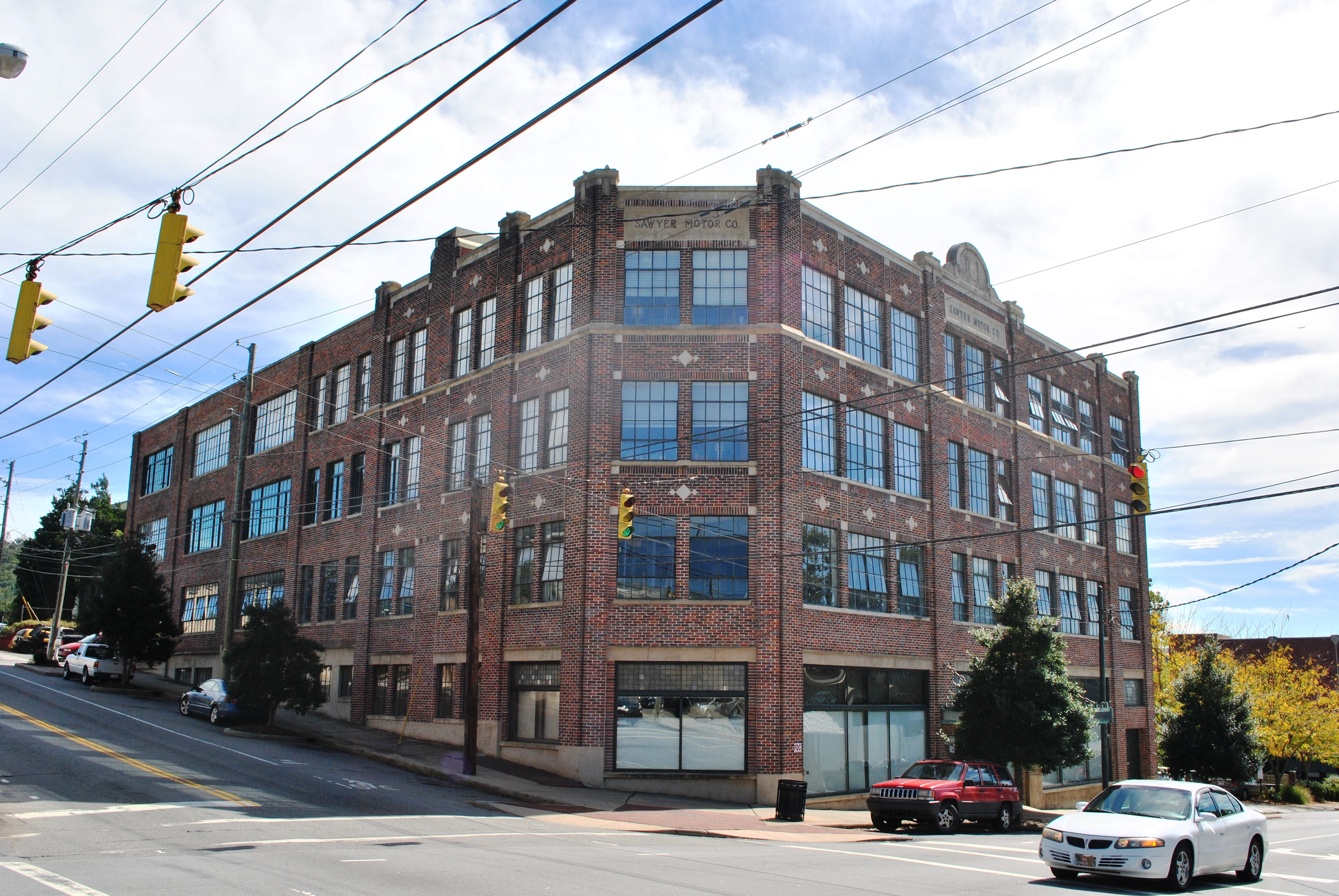

- Location within North Carolina Location within the United States
- Location: 100 Coxe Ave., Asheville, North Carolina
- Coordinates: 35°35′26″N 82°33′17″W
- Area: less than one acre
- Built: 1925
- MPS: Asheville Historic and Architectural MRA
- NRHP reference No.: 79001682
- Added to NRHP: April 26, 1979

Sawyer Motor Company Building is a historic automobile showroom and service facility located at Asheville, Buncombe County, North Carolina. It was built in 1925, and is a four-story, steel frame and reinforced concrete building sheathed in brick. The building is trimmed with cast concrete.

It was listed on the National Register of Historic Places in 1979.
