= John Ravenscroft =

John Ravenscroft may refer to:

- John Ravenscroft (engineer), engineer and engine designer for British manufacturer TVR
- John Ravenscroft (horticulturalist), British founder of Bridgemere Garden World
- John Ravenscroft (composer) (c. 1665 – 1697), English violinist and composer
- John Robert Parker Ravenscroft, English radio broadcaster known as John Peel (1939–2004)
- John Stark Ravenscroft (1772–1830), American bishop of the Episcopal Church
