= Grove Arcade =

Building in Asheville, North Carolina

- Grove Arcade Building
- U.S. National Register of Historic Places
- U.S. Historic district – Contributing property
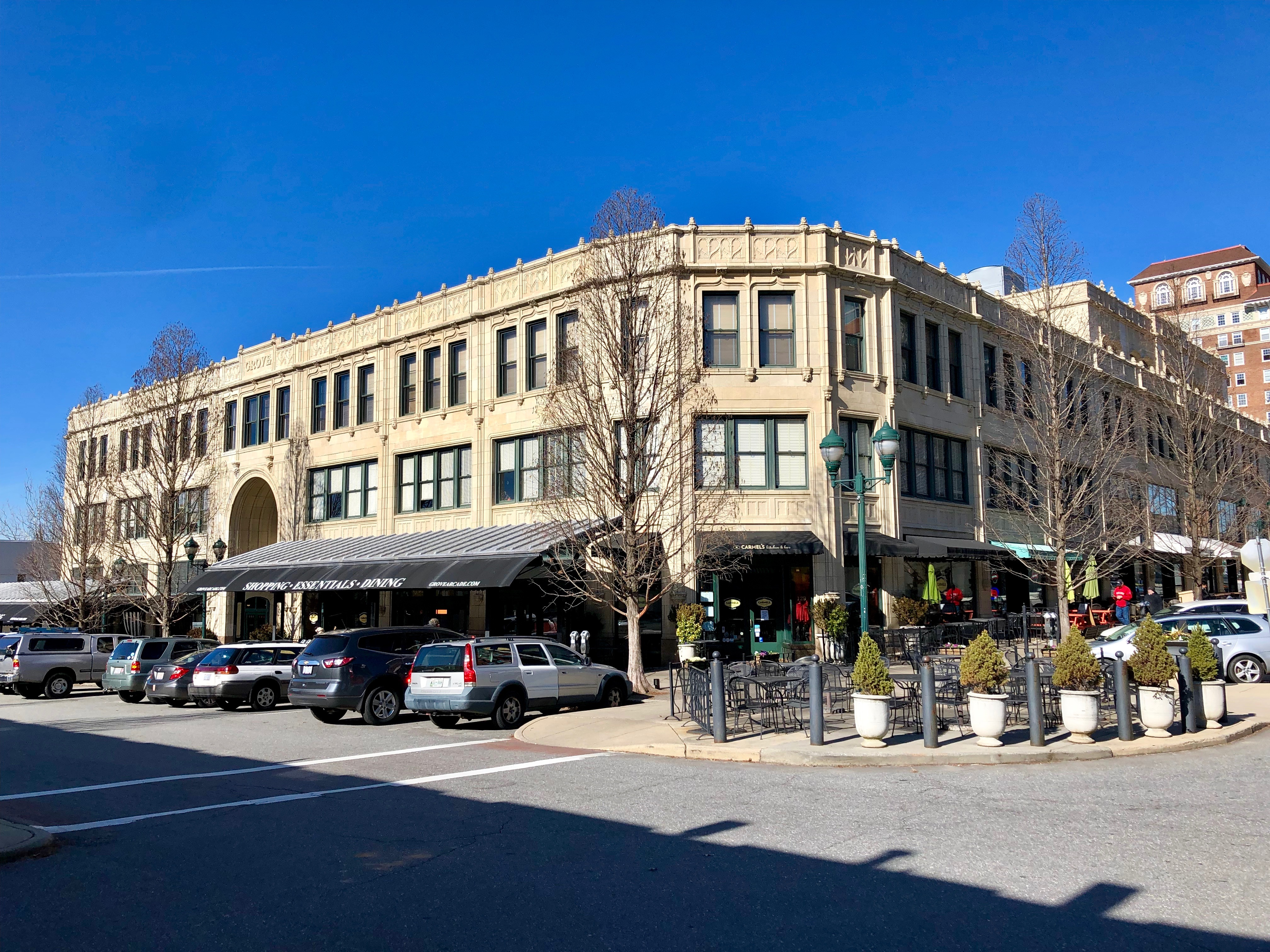
- View from Battery Park Avenue (2019)
- Interactive map highlighting the location of Grove Arcade
- Location: Battery Park, Battle Sq., Asheville, North Carolina
- Coordinates: 35°35′44″N 82°33′24″W
- Area: 4 acres (1.6 ha)
- Built: 1926–1929 (97 years ago)
- Built by: Geary, John M., Co.
- Architect: Parker, Charles N.
- Architectural style: Late Gothic Revival, Tudor Revival
- NRHP reference No.: 76001306
- Added to NRHP: May 19, 1976

The Grove Arcade, also known as the Arcade Building, is a historic commercial and residential building in Asheville, North Carolina, in its downtown historic district. It was built from 1926 to 1929, and is a Tudor Revival and Late Gothic Revival style building consisting of two stacked blocks. The lower block is a rectangular slab with rounded corners; it is capped by the second block, a two-tier set-back story.

The steel frame and reinforced concrete building was designed to serve as a base for an unbuilt skyscraper. It features a roof deck with a bronze semi-elliptical balcony, molded terra cotta pilasters, and a ziggurat-like arrangement of huge ramps to the roof deck. The building occupies a full city block and housed one of America's first indoor shopping malls. It was sold to the federal government in 1943. The building housed the National Climatic Data Center until 1995. It was listed on the National Register of Historic Places in 1976.

In 1997, the City of Asheville acquired the title to the building under the National Monument Act. The city then signed a 198-year lease with the Grove Arcade Public Market Foundation, a group founded to preserve the building's structural and historical integrity. Over the next five years, the building would be restored, then reopened to the public in 2002. Today, it has shops and restaurants on the first floor, offices on the second, and residential apartments on the third through fifth floors, referred to as The Residences at Grove Arcade.

E.W. Grove, developer of Grove Park Inn, wanted a "classy look to a modern palace of commercialism." The north side has winged lions without claws, a symbol of Venice, Italy.

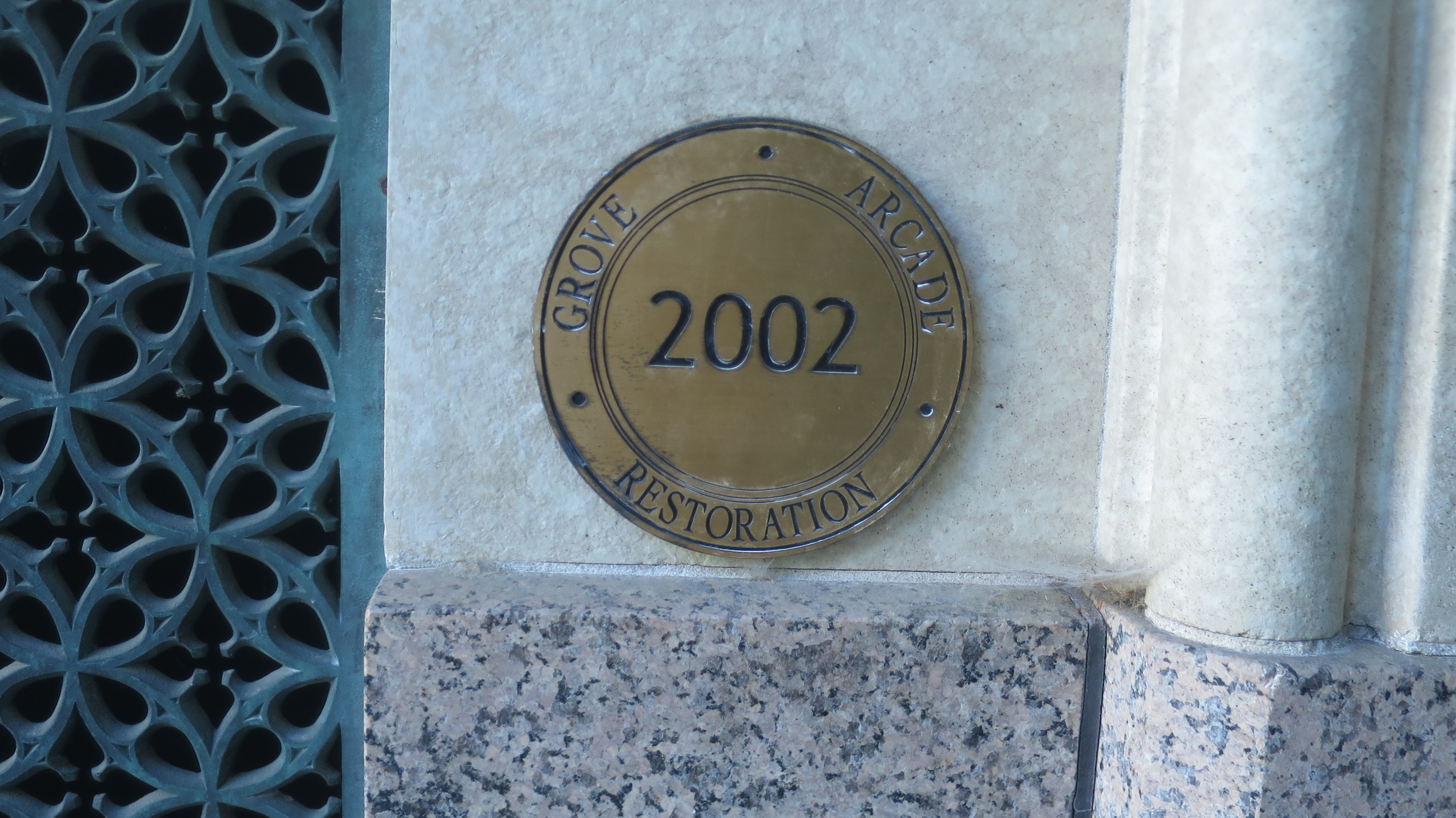
Plaque for the 2002 Grove Arcade restoration.

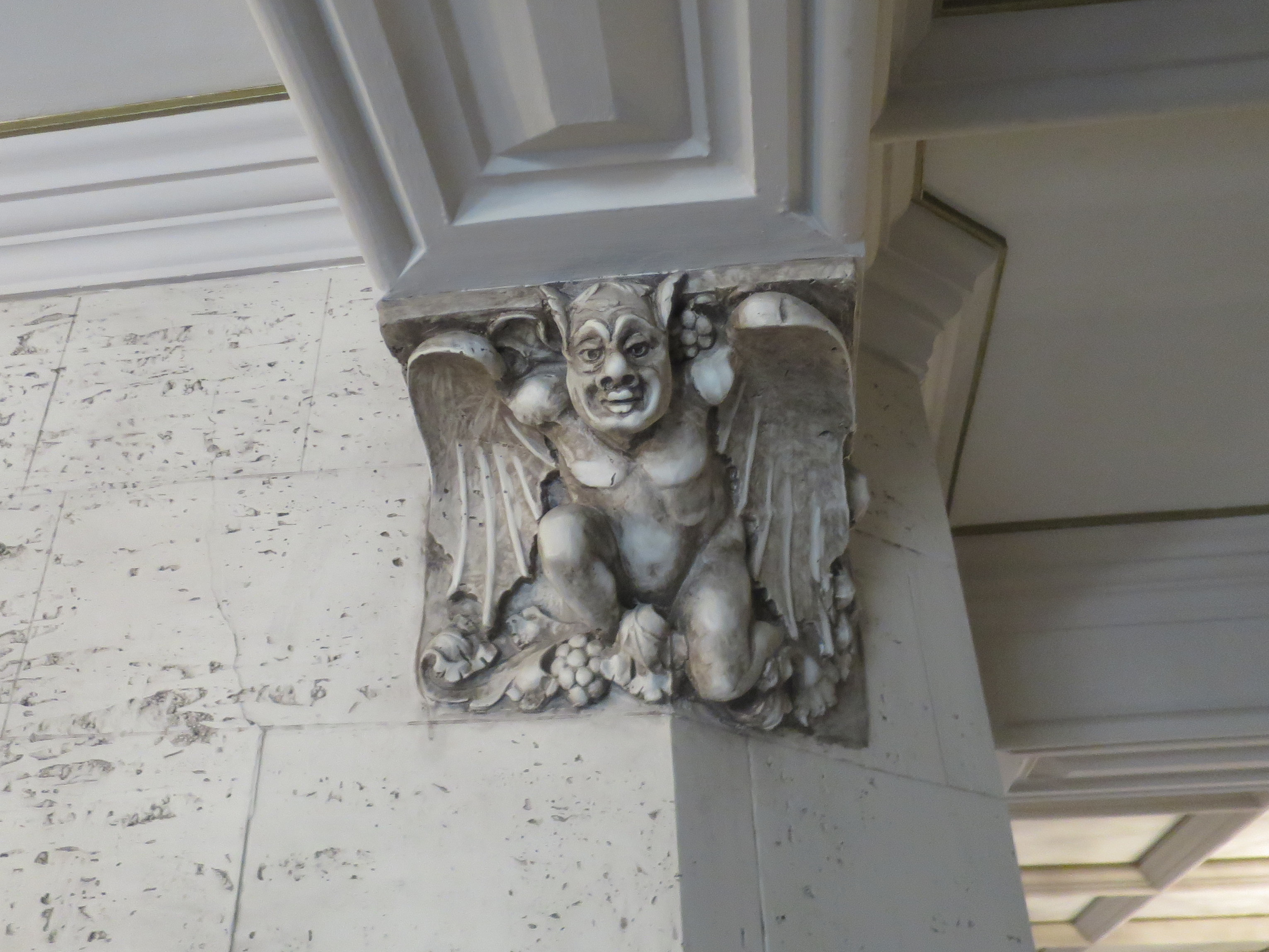
"Winged lion" statue at the Grove Arcade.

== Interior Gallery ==
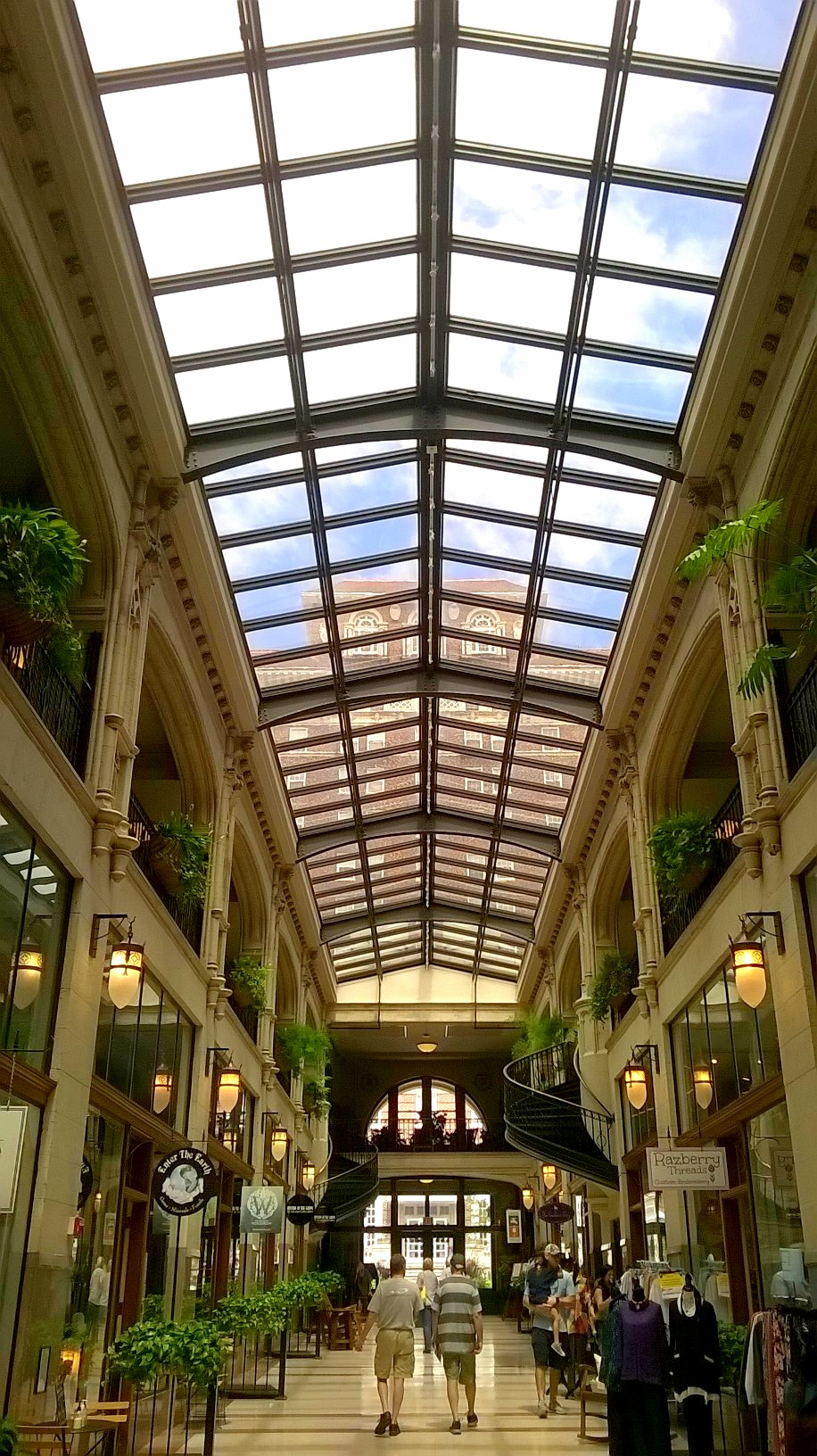
North side ground floor view

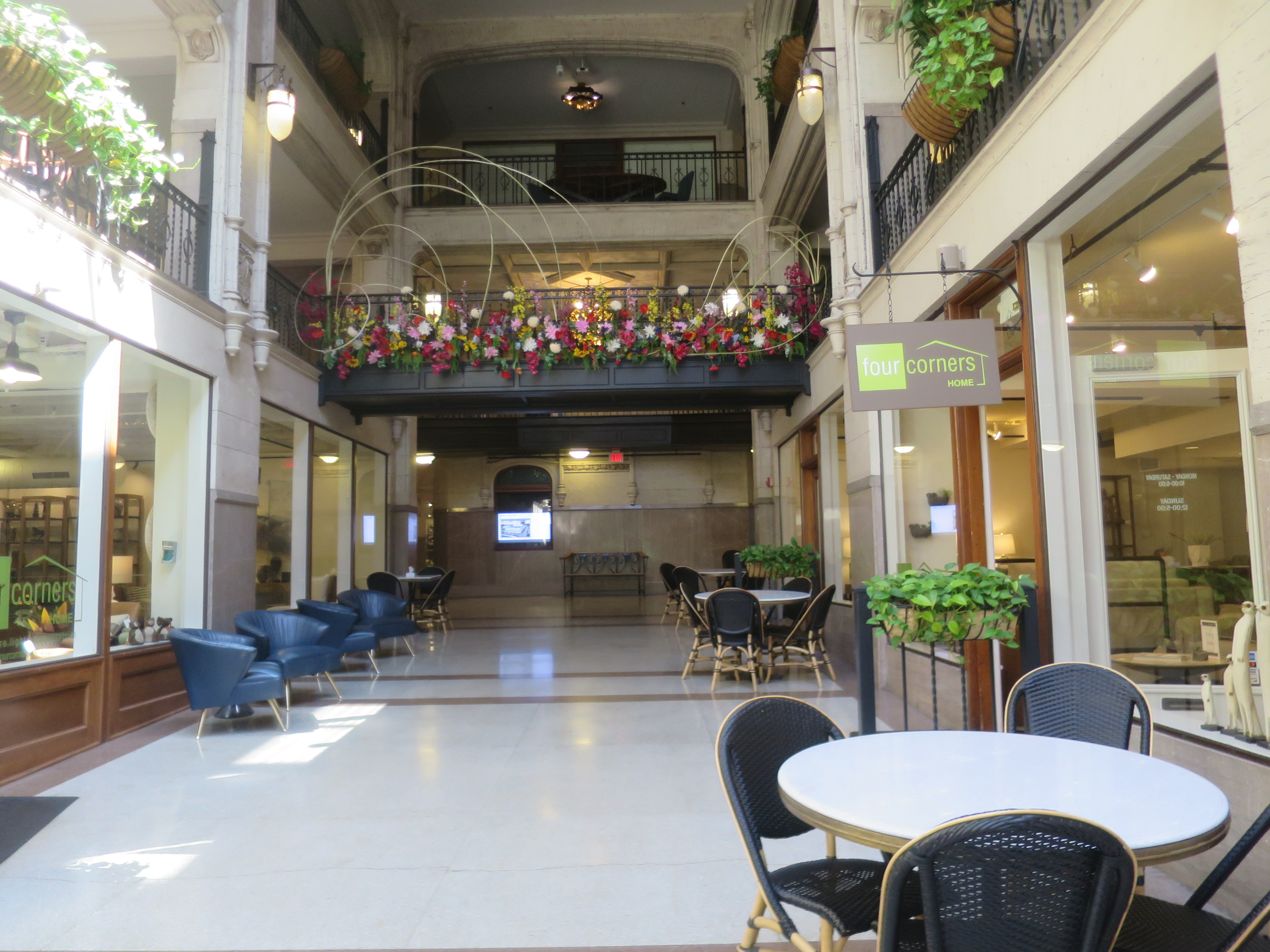
South side ground floor view

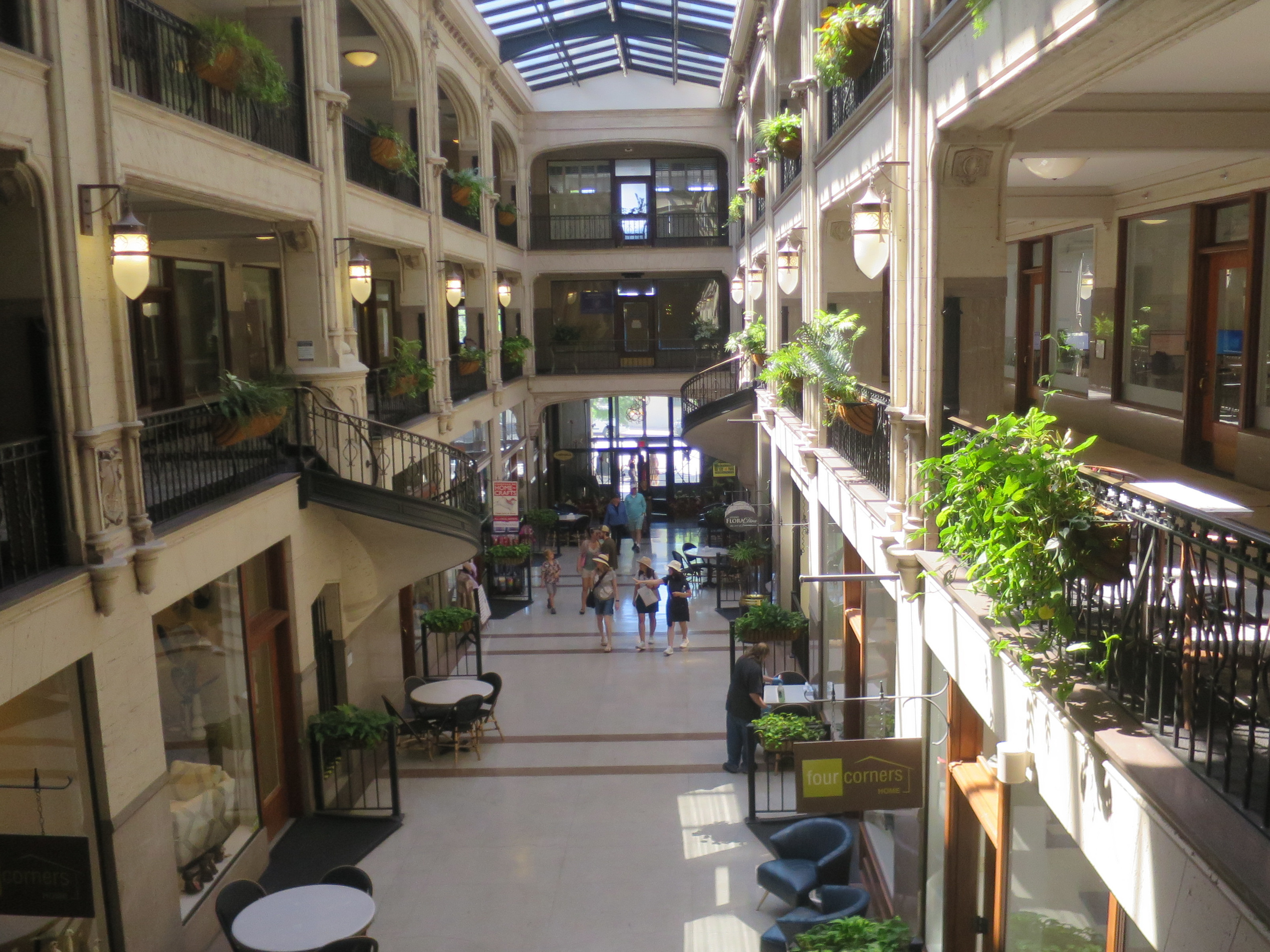
South side second floor view

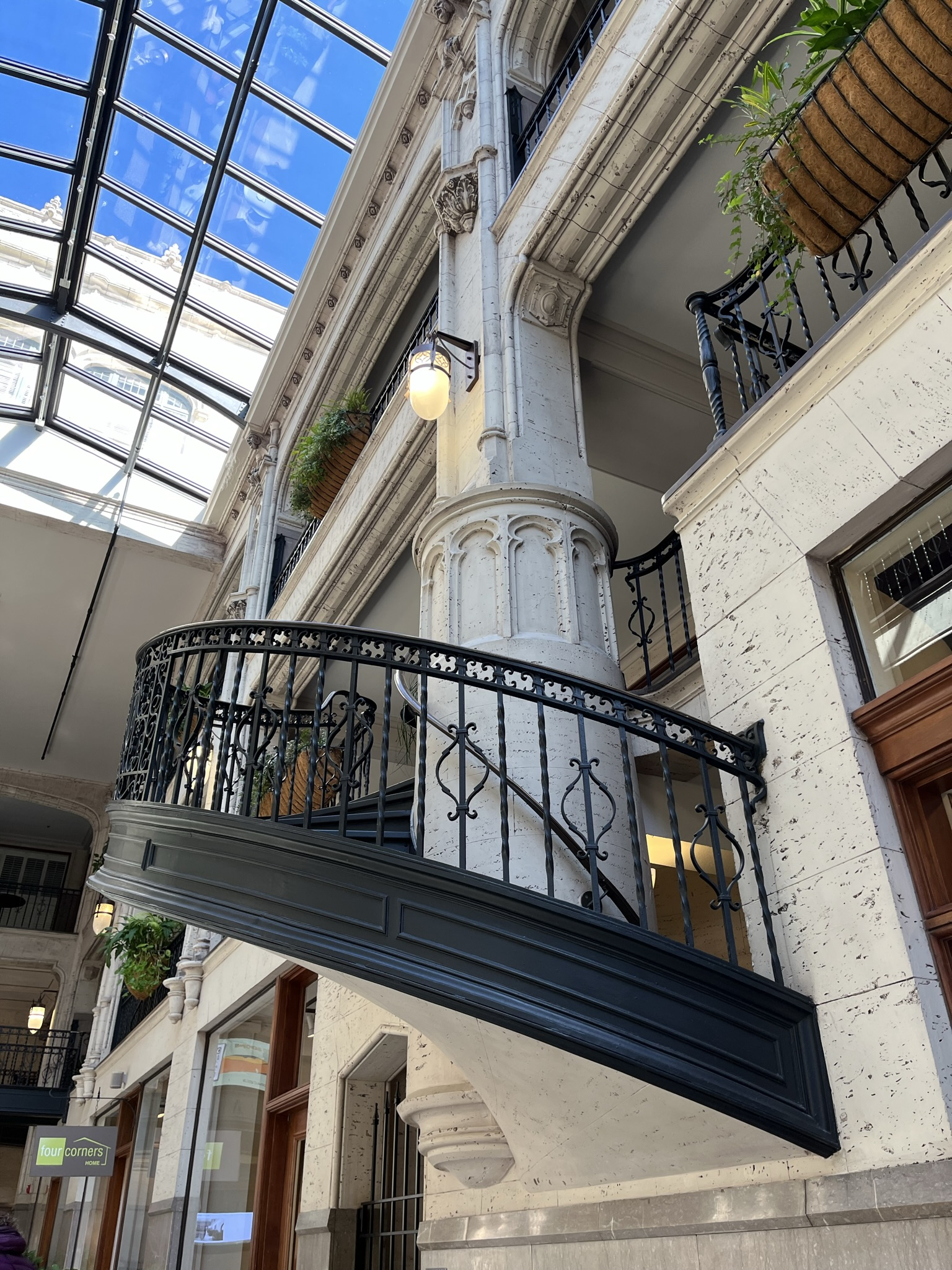
Spiral staircase between first and second floors
