= B & B Motor Company Building =

Historic building in North Carolina, US

- U.S. National Register of Historic Places
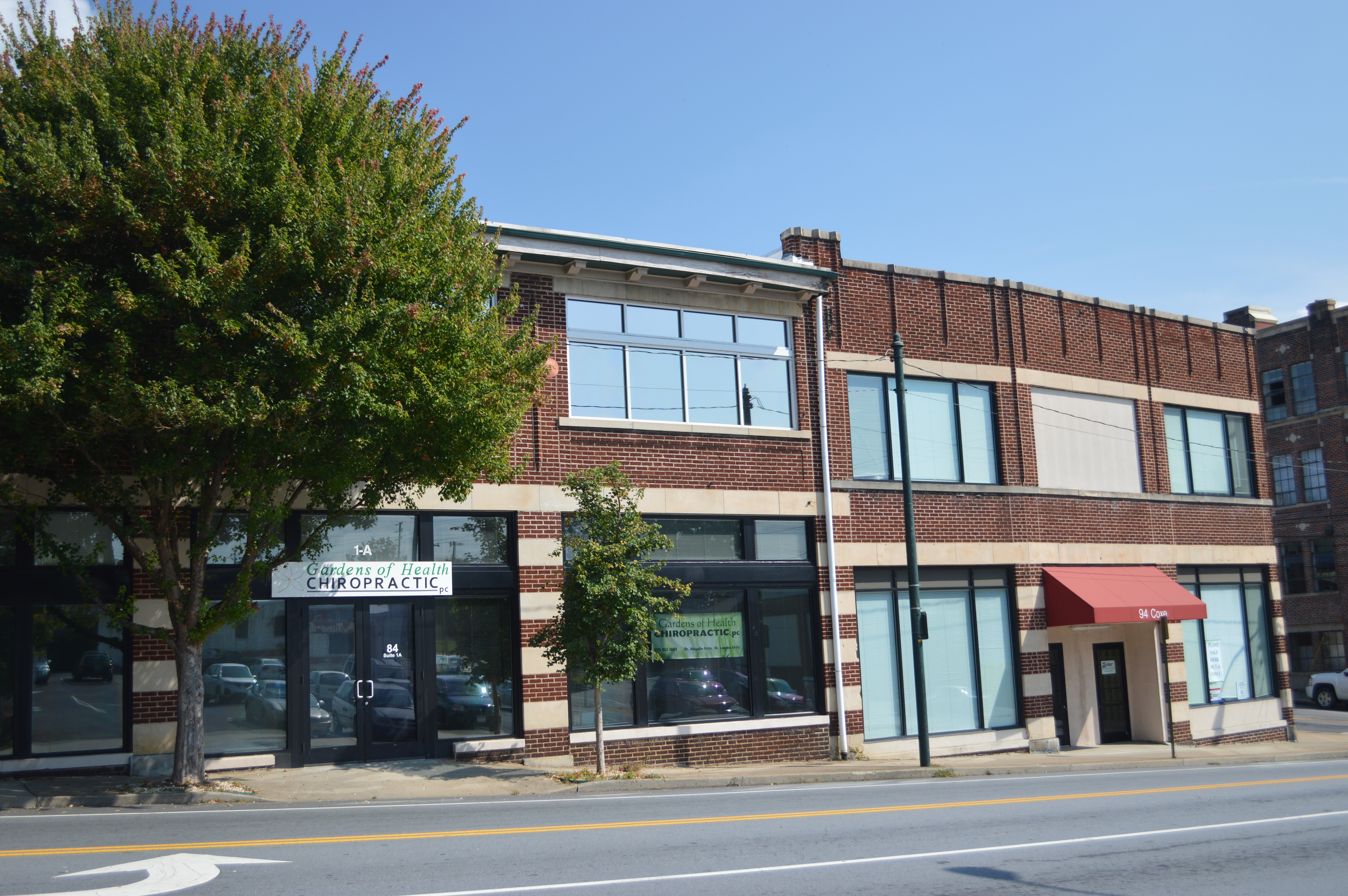

- Location within North Carolina Location within the United States
- Location: 84-94 Coxe Ave., Asheville, North Carolina
- Coordinates: 35°35′28″N 82°33′17″W
- Area: less than one acre
- Built: 1925
- MPS: Asheville Historic and Architectural MRA
- NRHP reference No.: 79001666
- Added to NRHP: April 26, 1979

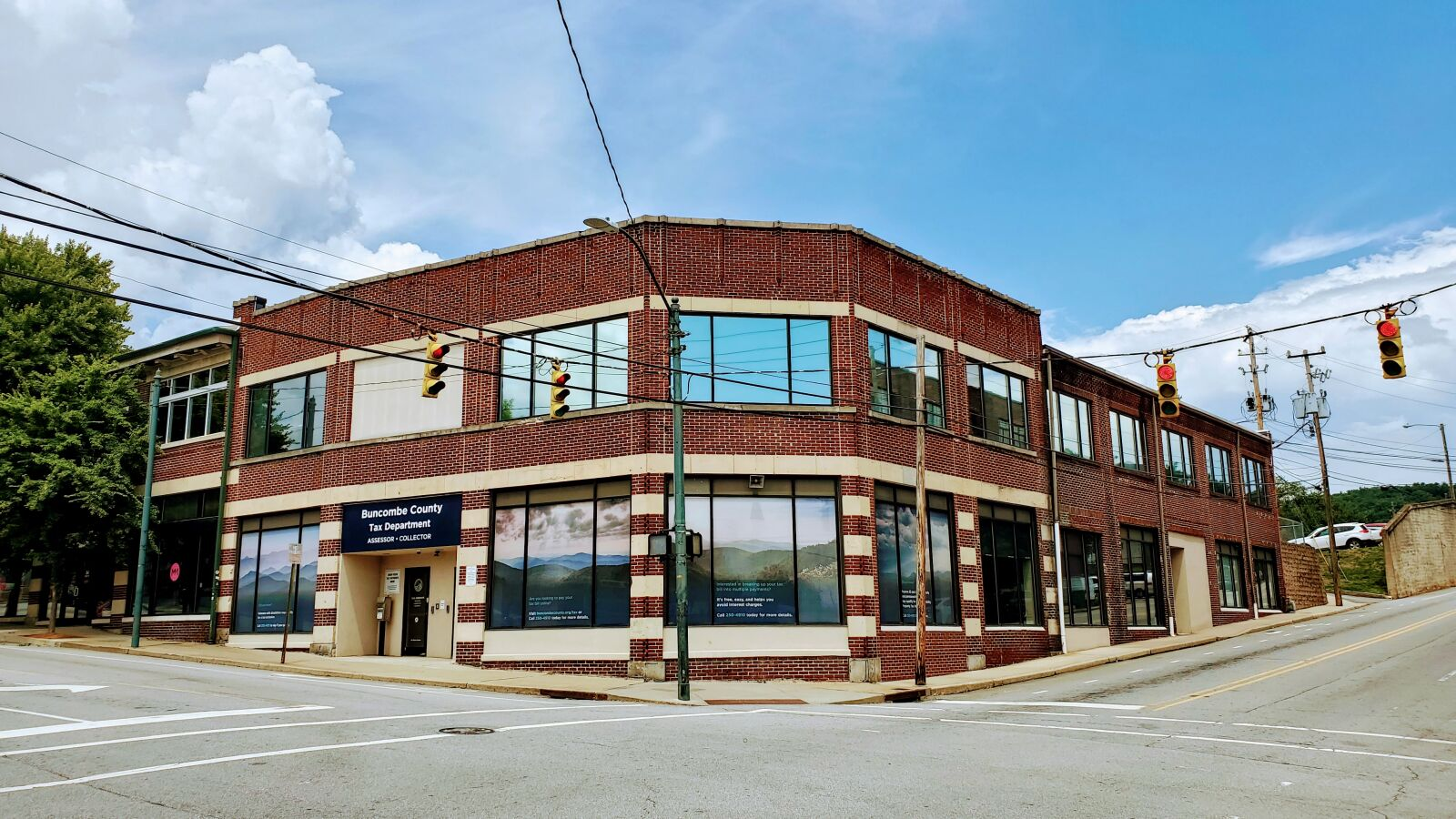
July, 2021

B & B Motor Company Building is a historic auto showroom and service center located in Asheville, Buncombe County, North Carolina. It was built in 1925, and is a two-story reinforced concrete and structural clay tile building faced in brick. It features limestone trim and a high decorated parapet.

It was listed on the National Register of Historic Places in 1979.
