= Ravenscroft School (Asheville, North Carolina) =

Historic school building in North Carolina, United States

- U.S. National Register of Historic Places
- U.S. Historic district – Contributing property
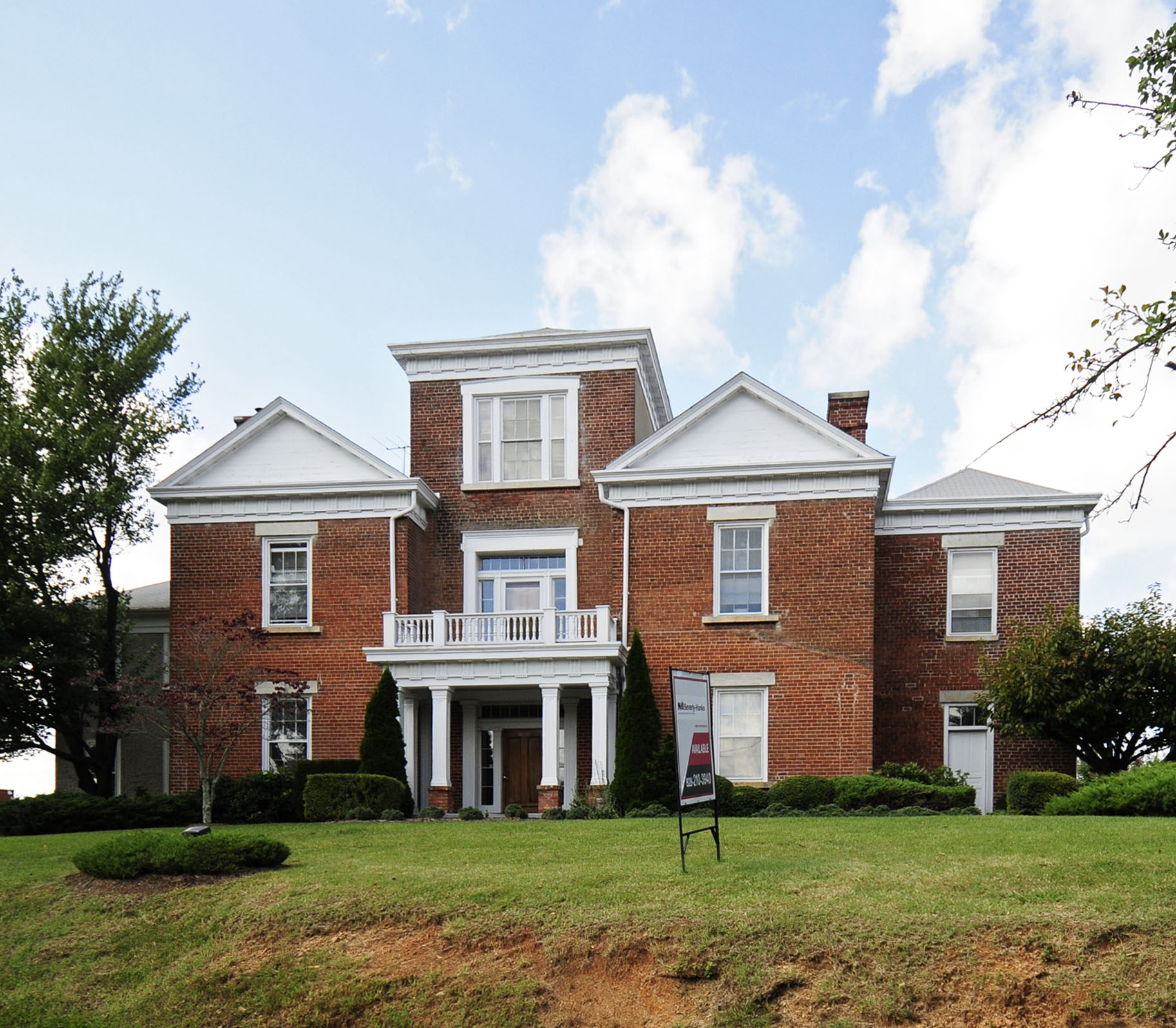
- Ravenscroft School, September 2012

- Location within North Carolina Location within the United States
- Location: 29 Ravenscroft Dr., Asheville, North Carolina
- Coordinates: 35°35′29″N 82°33′15″W
- Area: less than one acre
- Built: c. 1845
- Architectural style: Greek Revival
- NRHP reference No.: 78001935
- Added to NRHP: December 12, 1978

Ravenscroft School, also known as Chateau Nollman, is a historic school building located at Asheville, Buncombe County, North Carolina. The oldest section was built about 1845, and is a two- to three-story brick building in the Greek Revival style. It consists of a squat, three-story, pyramidal-roofed tower with projecting two-story rectangular wings. The building has a number of later additions including a two-story brick wing and two-story frame wing. It was originally built as a residence, and housed a school from 1856 to the turn of the 20th century. It was used as a boarding or rooming house until 1977. The building is currently used as office space.

It was listed on the National Register of Historic Places in 1978. It is located in the Downtown Asheville Historic District.
