= Edward S. Stephens =

American educator

- Born: 1849; British Guiana
- Died: 30 September 1909 (aged 59–60)
- Occupation: Educator

Edward S. Stephens (c. 1849 – September 30, 1909) was an educator in the United States in the late 19th and early 20th centuries.

== Early life ==
Born in British Guiana, it is reported that Stephens was educated at University of Cambridge in England as well as at universities in France and Switzerland. Besides English, he could read and write Spanish, Dutch, French and Portuguese and also read Latin and Greek.

Information is not currently available as to when he moved to the United States or where he first resided, although it is believed that he arrived in the USA around 1889. It appears that in 1892 Stephens was persuaded by philanthropist George Washington Vanderbilt II to move to Asheville, North Carolina, from Raleigh, North Carolina, to become the first principal of the Catholic Hill School, the first public school for African Americans in Asheville, North Carolina. Once in Asheville, he saw the need for an institute to support young African American men of the area and along with other prominent African American citizens, persuaded Vanderbilt to provide critical funding so they could establish the Young Men's Institute, modeled after YMCA. Stephens was only in Asheville for about three years but he was recognized for his strong influence. The Catholic Hill School burned down in 1917 and its successor, the noted Stephens-Lee High School (now Stephens-Lee Recreation Center), was partially named after Stephens in recognition of his contributions.

Stephens and Elizabeth Riddick, a teacher at Catholic Hill, moved to Topeka, Kansas, in 1895, where they married and founded a kindergarten. Stephens also secured funding from the Kansas state legislature to start the Kansas Industrial and Educational Institute—later known as Kansas Technical Institute—exclusively for African American students, with Stephens as its first president. The Institute later became the Kansas Vocational School, with a campus ultimately comprising over 100 acres It was subsequently renamed the Kansas Technical Institute at Topeka. While in Topeka, Stephens was reported to have fallen out with other leaders in the African American community and been pushed out by them of his leadership position with the Institute.

It isn't recorded when the Stephens' left Kansas but the Topeka State Journal of July 3, 1903, carried a small notice stating that "Edward Stephens...is now living in Worcester, Mass. He is employed as a translator for Houghton-Mifflin Company." At some point between then and 1906, Stephens and Riddick moved to Bridgeport, Connecticut, where they continued teaching. They again founded a school, this one in their home.

Edward Stephens died of tuberculosis September 30, 1909, and was buried in Mountain Grove Cemetery. Elizabeth lived another 34 years. In her widowhood, she was active in Bridgeport's Phillis Wheatley branch of the Young Women's Christian Association.
