= National Register of Historic Places listings in Buncombe County, North Carolina =

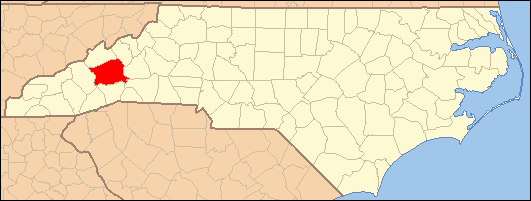

This list includes properties and districts listed on the National Register of Historic Places in Buncombe County, North Carolina. Click the "Map of all coordinates" link to the right to view an online map of all properties and districts with latitude and longitude coordinates in the table below.

== Current listings ==
This National Park Service list is complete through NPS recent listings posted May 1, 2026.

	Name on the Register	Image	Date listed	Location	City or town	Description
1	Judge Junius G. Adams House		October 5, 2001 (#01001077)	11 Stuyvesant Rd. 35°32′09″N 82°32′14″W	Biltmore Forest	
2	Alexander Inn		May 31, 1984 (#84001932)	Address Restricted	Swannanoa	Demolished
3	Mrs. Minnie Alexander Cottage	Mrs. Minnie Alexander Cottage	December 21, 1989 (#89002135)	218 Patton Ave. 35°35′34″N 82°33′40″W	Asheville	
4	All Souls Episcopal Church and Parish House	All Souls Episcopal Church and Parish House	November 15, 1979 (#79001664)	2 Angle St. 35°33′55″N 82°32′34″W	Asheville	
5	Arcade Building	Arcade Building	May 19, 1976 (#76001306)	Battery Park, Battle Sq. 35°35′44″N 82°33′24″W	Asheville	
6	Asheville City Hall	Asheville City Hall	November 7, 1976 (#76001307)	City County Plaza; 35°35′44″N 82°32′55″W	Asheville	
7	Asheville High School	Asheville High School	April 26, 1996 (#96000481)	419 McDowell St. 35°34′17″N 82°33′08″W	Asheville	
8	Asheville School		June 3, 1996 (#96000614)	Roughly bounded by Patton Ave., the former Southern railroad line, Interstate 40, Sand Hill Rd., and the Malvern Hills subdivision 35°33′52″N 82°37′28″W	Asheville	
9	Asheville Transfer and Storage Company Building	Asheville Transfer and Storage Company Building	April 26, 1979 (#79001665)	192-194 Coxe Ave. 35°35′14″N 82°33′16″W	Asheville	
10	B & B Motor Company Building	B & B Motor Company Building	April 26, 1979 (#79001666)	84-94 Coxe Ave. 35°35′28″N 82°33′17″W	Asheville	
11	Zebulon H. Baird House	Zebulon H. Baird House	April 30, 2009 (#09000261)	460 Weaverville Rd. 35°39′57″N 82°35′03″W	Weaverville	
12	Clarence Barker Memorial Hospital	Clarence Barker Memorial Hospital	November 15, 1979 (#79001667)	2-6 Reed St. 35°33′54″N 82°32′28″W	Asheville	
13	Dr. John G. & Nannie H. Barrett Farm	Dr. John G. & Nannie H. Barrett Farm	May 8, 2013 (#13000245)	75 Ox Creek Rd. 35°41′32″N 82°29′40″W	Weaverville	
14	Battery Park Hotel	Battery Park Hotel	July 14, 1977 (#77000990)	Battle Sq. 35°35′49″N 82°32′19″W	Asheville	
15	Bent Creek Campus of the Appalachian Forest Experiment Station		April 29, 1993 (#93000373)	Brevard Rd. S of jct. with I-26; 35°30′09″N 82°35′49″W	Asheville	
16	Biltmore Estate	Biltmore Estate	October 15, 1966 (#66000586)	One Biltmore Plaza; 35°34′03″N 82°32′34″W	Asheville	
17	Biltmore Estate Office	Biltmore Estate Office	November 15, 1979 (#79001668)	10 Biltmore Plaza; 35°34′03″N 82°32′34″W	Asheville	
18	Biltmore Hardware Building	Biltmore Hardware Building	August 21, 2003 (#03000800)	28-32 Hendersonville Rd. 35°34′03″N 82°32′38″W	Asheville	
19	Biltmore Hospital	Biltmore Hospital	September 1, 2005 (#05000938)	14 All Souls Crescent; 35°33′52″N 82°32′29″W	Asheville	
20	Biltmore Industries, Inc.	Biltmore Industries, Inc.	February 1, 1980 (#80002802)	Grovewood Rd. 35°37′20″N 82°32′41″W	Asheville	
21	Biltmore Shoe Store	Biltmore Shoe Store	November 15, 1979 (#79001669)	8 Lodge St. 35°34′03″N 82°32′34″W	Asheville	
22	Biltmore Village Commercial Buildings	Biltmore Village Commercial Buildings	November 15, 1979 (#79001670)	Brook St. and Biltmore Plaza; 35°34′03″N 82°32′34″W	Asheville	
23	Biltmore Village Cottage District	Biltmore Village Cottage District	November 15, 1979 (#79001671)	Swan St., All Souls Crescent and Boston Way; 35°33′58″N 82°32′29″W	Asheville	
24	Biltmore Village Cottages	Biltmore Village Cottages	November 15, 1979 (#79001672)	18 Angle St. and 75 Hendersonville Rd. 35°33′58″N 82°32′38″W	Asheville	Moved away from listed addresses in 1983. Still listed as a historic place, but nomination form states "no longer on NR".
25	Biltmore-Oteen Bank Building	Biltmore-Oteen Bank Building	November 15, 1979 (#79001673)	12 Lodge St. 35°34′03″N 82°32′34″W	Asheville	
26	Black Mountain College Historic District	Black Mountain College Historic District	October 5, 1982 (#82001281)	SR 2468; 35°37′59″N 82°22′17″W	Black Mountain	
27	Black Mountain Downtown Historic District	Black Mountain Downtown Historic District	June 2, 2004 (#04000570)	Black Mountain Ave., Sutton Ave., and Cherry, Broadway, and State Sts. 35°36′58″N 82°19′14″W	Black Mountain	
28	Blake House	Blake House	August 30, 2010 (#10000600)	150 Royal Pines Dr. 35°28′28″N 82°31′01″W	Arden	
29	Bledsoe Building	Bledsoe Building	April 18, 2003 (#03000267)	771-783 Haywood Rd. 35°34′44″N 82°35′40″W	Asheville	
30	Blue Ridge Assembly Historic District	Blue Ridge Assembly Historic District	September 17, 1979 (#79003327)	S of Black Mountain on SR 2720; 35°35′06″N 82°20′21″W	Black Mountain	
31	Blue Ridge Parkway	Blue Ridge Parkway	December 13, 2024 (#100011353)	Blue Ridge Parkway through Virginia and North Carolina; 35°44′10″N 82°20′37″W	Asheville vicinity	
32	William E. Breese Sr. House	William E. Breese Sr. House	April 28, 1980 (#80002803)	674 Biltmore Ave. 35°34′23″N 82°32′44″W	Asheville	
33	Brigman-Chambers House	Brigman-Chambers House	June 2, 2004 (#04000573)	NC 1003, 0.6 miles west of its junction with NC 2118; 35°42′22″N 82°29′27″W	Weaverville	
34	Broadway Market Building		September 1, 2005 (#05000939)	201 Broadway; 35°36′05″N 82°33′22″W	Asheville	Demolished.
35	William Jennings Bryan House	William Jennings Bryan House	June 23, 1983 (#83001836)	107 Evelyn Pl. 35°36′45″N 82°33′02″W	Asheville	
36	Building at 130–132 Biltmore Avenue	Building at 130–132 Biltmore Avenue	April 26, 1979 (#79003323)	130–132 Biltmore Ave. 35°35′25″N 82°33′04″W	Asheville	
37	Building at 134–136½ Biltmore Avenue	Building at 134–136½ Biltmore Avenue	April 26, 1979 (#79003324)	134–136½ Biltmore Ave. 35°35′25″N 82°33′04″W	Asheville	
38	Building at 140 Biltmore Avenue	Building at 140 Biltmore Avenue	April 26, 1979 (#79003325)	140 Biltmore Ave. 35°35′25″N 82°33′04″W	Asheville	
39	Buncombe County Boys' Training School	Buncombe County Boys' Training School	September 30, 1997 (#97001197)	177 Erwin Hills Rd. 35°37′14″N 82°37′23″W	Asheville	
40	Buncombe County Courthouse	Buncombe County Courthouse	May 10, 1979 (#79001674)	College and Davidson Sts. 35°35′45″N 82°32′55″W	Asheville	
41	Camp Academy	Camp Academy	September 19, 1985 (#85002421)	NC 63; 35°39′22″N 82°42′52″W	Leicester	
42	William Nelson Camp Jr. House	William Nelson Camp Jr. House	December 17, 1998 (#98001530)	92 Flat Top Mountain Rd. 35°32′56″N 82°23′31″W	Fairview	
43	Carter-Swain House	Carter-Swain House	July 2, 1987 (#87001114)	E side SR 2162, N of jct. with SR 2163; 35°47′24″N 82°29′31″W	Democrat	
44	Chestnut Hill Historic District	Chestnut Hill Historic District	March 17, 1983 (#83001837)	Roughly bounded by Hillside, Washington, Broad, Hollywood, and Orchards Sts. and Merrimon Ave. 35°36′13″N 82°32′55″W	Asheville	
45	James Madison and Leah Arcouet Chiles House	James Madison and Leah Arcouet Chiles House	January 25, 2018 (#100002045)	21 Chiles Ave. 35°34′34″N 82°32′04″W	Asheville	
46	Church of St. Lawrence	Church of St. Lawrence	March 24, 1978 (#78001933)	97 Haywood St. 35°35′51″N 82°33′23″W	Asheville	
47	Church of the Redeemer	Church of the Redeemer	September 19, 1985 (#85002419)	1202 Riverside Dr. 35°37′28″N 82°35′33″W	Asheville	
48	Claxton School	Claxton School	June 4, 1992 (#92000671)	241 Merrimon Ave. 35°36′28″N 82°33′13″W	Asheville	
49	Clingman Avenue Historic District	Clingman Avenue Historic District	June 9, 2004 (#04000583)	Roughly along Clingman Ave., from Hillard Ave. to Haywood Ave. 35°35′24″N 82°33′48″W	Asheville	
50	Conabeer Chrysler Building	Conabeer Chrysler Building	April 26, 1979 (#79001675)	162-164 Coxe Ave. 35°35′18″N 82°33′17″W	Asheville	
51	Craggy Historic District		April 19, 2023 (#100008847)	8, 10, 18, and 22 Old Leicester Hwy. 35°37′42″N 82°36′12″W	Woodfin	
52	Demens-Rumbough-Crawley House	Demens-Rumbough-Crawley House	June 1, 1982 (#82003435)	31 Park Ave. 35°35′21″N 82°33′59″W	Asheville	
53	Dougherty Heights Historic District		January 14, 2011 (#10001132)	Church St., Connally St., and North Dougherty St., Laurel Circle, Prospect St., and New Bern Ave. 35°37′03″N 82°19′26″W	Black Mountain	
54	Downtown Asheville Historic District	Downtown Asheville Historic District	April 26, 1979 (#79001676)	Roughly bounded by 1240 Valley St., Hilliard Ave., and Broad Ave.; also 60 and 64 Biltmore Ave.; also Church St. and Ravenscroft Dr.; also 76-129 Biltmore Ave., 64 Carter St., 11-23 Grove St., 14-44 N. and 12-25 S. French Broad Ave. 35°35′42″N 82°33′12″W	Asheville	Second, third, and fourth sets of boundaries represent boundary increases of May 25, 1989, August 23, 1990, and (increase-and-decrease) December 28, 2011
55	E.D. Latta Nurses' Residence	E.D. Latta Nurses' Residence	April 26, 1979 (#79001677)	159 Woodfin St. 35°35′58″N 82°32′48″W	Asheville	
56	Eliada Home	Eliada Home	April 22, 1993 (#93000314)	2 Compton Dr. 35°36′08″N 82°37′08″W	Asheville	
57	Joseph P. Eller House	Joseph P. Eller House	August 11, 2004 (#04000826)	494 Clarks' Chapel Rd. 35°43′51″N 82°34′20″W	Weaverville	
58	Douglas Ellington House	Douglas Ellington House	October 16, 1986 (#86002881)	583 Chunns Cove Rd. 35°37′07″N 82°31′24″W	Asheville	
59	Bruce A. and June L. Elmore Lustron House	Bruce A. and June L. Elmore Lustron House	August 27, 2013 (#13000635)	70 Hampden Rd. 35°35′01″N 82°29′48″W	Asheville	
60	Engadine	Engadine	September 24, 2001 (#01001027)	US 19/23, 0.3 miles E of Haywood; 35°32′20″N 82°45′43″W	Candler	
61	Fire Station Number 4	Fire Station Number 4	April 6, 2000 (#00000336)	300 Merrimon Ave. 35°36′32″N 82°33′17″W	Asheville	
62	First Baptist Church	First Baptist Church	July 13, 1976 (#76001308)	Oak and Woodfin Sts. 35°35′57″N 82°32′52″W	Asheville	
63	Foster's Log Cabin Court	Foster's Log Cabin Court	May 1, 2017 (#100000939)	330 and 332 Weaverville Rd. 35°39′38″N 82°34′55″W	Woodfin	
64	Grove Park Historic District	Grove Park Historic District	April 13, 1989 (#89000247)	Roughly bounded by Evelyn Pl., Macon Ave., Howland Rd., Woodland Rd., Canterbury Ln., Charlotte St., and Murdock Ave.; also roughly Kimberly Ave. from Maywood St. to north of Evelyn Pl., including Grove Park Inn Country Club; 35°36′38″N 82°32′45″W	Asheville	Second set of boundaries represents a boundary increase of December 18, 1990
65	Grove Park Inn	Grove Park Inn	April 3, 1973 (#73001295)	Macon Ave. 35°37′15″N 82°31′26″W	Asheville	
66	Rafael Guastavino Sr., Estate	Rafael Guastavino Sr., Estate	July 13, 1989 (#89000849)	NC 9, 0.8 miles south its junction with SR 2713; 35°35′51″N 82°18′35″W	Black Mountain	
67	Gunston Hall		October 24, 1991 (#91001505)	324 Vanderbilt Rd. 35°32′50″N 82°32′11″W	Biltmore Forest	
68	High Top Colony Historic District		December 20, 2021 (#100007246)	143-225 High Top Colony, 14-42 Hoot Owl, and 10-21 Grey Eagle Rd. 35°35′32″N 82°20′03″W	Black Mountain vicinity	Hopkins Chapel A.M.E. Zion Church, 21 College Place, Ashville, SG100011171, LISTED, 12/17/2024
69	Hopkins Chapel A.M.E. Zion Church		December 17, 2024 (#100011171)	21 College Place; 35°35′57″N 82°32′38″W	Asheville	
70	Intheoaks	Intheoaks	April 10, 1991 (#91000361)	510 Vance Ave. 35°36′40″N 82°19′40″W	Black Mountain	
71	Thomas Jarrett House	Thomas Jarrett House	January 21, 1994 (#93001535)	46 Louisiana Ave. 35°34′47″N 82°35′28″W	Asheville	
72	Kenilworth Inn	Kenilworth Inn	December 31, 2001 (#01001423)	60 Caledonia Rd. 35°34′20″N 82°32′27″W	Asheville	
73	John A. Lanning House		September 23, 1982 (#82003437)	W of Fairview on SR 3128; 35°31′15″N 82°25′56″W	Fairview	
74	Manor and Cottages	Manor and Cottages	January 26, 1978 (#78001934)	265 Charlotte St. 35°36′29″N 82°32′33″W	Asheville	
75	Dr. Cireo McAfee McCracken House	Dr. Cireo McAfee McCracken House	September 1, 1995 (#95001066)	1384 Charlotte Highway; 35°31′28″N 82°24′34″W	Fairview	
76	McGeahy Building	McGeahy Building	November 15, 1979 (#79001679)	7½ Biltmore Plaza; 35°34′03″N 82°32′34″W	Asheville	
77	George A. Mears House	George A. Mears House	April 26, 1979 (#79001678)	137 Biltmore Ave. 35°35′25″N 82°33′04″W	Asheville	
78	Boyce K. and Kitzi McLamb Miller House		August 7, 2023 (#100009224)	5 Hemphill Rd. 35°33′33″N 82°29′10″W	Asheville vicinity	
79	Monte Vista Hotel	Monte Vista Hotel	April 30, 2008 (#08000366)	308 W. State St. 35°36′50″N 82°19′37″W	Black Mountain	
80	Montford Area Historic District	Montford Area Historic District	November 25, 1977 (#77000991)	Irregular pattern along Montford Ave. 35°36′10″N 82°33′53″W	Asheville	
81	Municipal Golf Course	Municipal Golf Course	April 20, 2005 (#05000318)	226 Fairway Dr. 35°34′45″N 82°30′08″W	Asheville	
82	North Carolina Electrical Power Company Electric Generating Plant	North Carolina Electrical Power Company Electric Generating Plant	June 25, 1999 (#99000754)	2024 Riverside Dr. 35°38′25″N 82°35′53″W	Woodfin	
83	Norwood Park Historic District	Norwood Park Historic District	August 29, 2008 (#08000815)	Bounded roughly on the west and south by Murdock St.; on the north by Woodward Ave.; and on the east by Norwood Ave. 35°36′56″N 82°33′09″W	Asheville	
84	Oteen Veterans Administration Hospital Historic District	Oteen Veterans Administration Hospital Historic District	November 20, 1985 (#85003529)	Northern side of U.S. Route 70; 35°35′27″N 82°29′05″W	Asheville	
85	Ottari Sanitarium	Ottari Sanitarium	October 16, 1986 (#86002876)	491 Kimberly Ave. 35°37′45″N 82°32′51″W	Asheville	
86	Overlook	Overlook	October 22, 1980 (#80002804)	710 Town Mountain Rd. 35°36′40″N 82°32′04″W	Asheville	
87	Proximity Park Historic District	Proximity Park Historic District	October 8, 2008 (#08000974)	Roughly bounded by Macon Ave., Howland Rd., Woodlink Rd., Charlotte St., and Sunset Trail; 35°36′52″N 82°32′33″W	Asheville	
88	Thomas Wadley Raoul House		November 28, 2006 (#06001105)	394 Vanderbilt Rd. 35°32′03″N 82°32′24″W	Asheville	
89	Ravenscroft School	Ravenscroft School	December 12, 1978 (#78001935)	29 Ravenscroft Dr. 35°35′29″N 82°33′15″W	Asheville	
90	Samuel Harrison Reed House	Samuel Harrison Reed House	November 15, 1979 (#79001680)	119 Dodge St. 35°33′51″N 82°32′22″W	Asheville	
91	Hans Rees' Sons Tannery Historic District		December 29, 2025 (#100012450)	191 Lyman Street: 4. 5. 11. 26 Foundy Street; 35°34′39″N 82°33′59″W	Asheville	
92	Reynolds House	Reynolds House	September 13, 1984 (#84001934)	100 Reynolds Hts. 35°38′37″N 82°34′41″W	Asheville	
93	Dr. Carl V. Reynolds House		August 19, 1982 (#82003436)	86 Edgemont Rd. 35°36′52″N 82°32′32″W	Asheville	
94	Rice-Cornell-Brown House		December 24, 1998 (#98001546)	29 Rice Branch Rd. 35°38′28″N 82°31′16″W	Asheville	
95	Richbourg Motors Building	Richbourg Motors Building	April 26, 1979 (#79001681)	50 Coxe Ave. 35°35′32″N 82°33′17″W	Asheville	
96	Richmond Hill House	Richmond Hill House	August 16, 1977 (#77000992)	45 Richmond Hill Rd. 35°36′40″N 82°34′50″W	Asheville	Demolished 2/1/2012
97	Riverside Industrial Historic District	Riverside Industrial Historic District	August 11, 2004 (#04000825)	Roughly bounded by Clingman Ave., Lyman St., Roberts St., and Riverside Dr. 35°35′10″N 82°34′01″W	Asheville	
98	S & W Cafeteria	S & W Cafeteria	March 28, 1977 (#77000993)	Patton Ave. 35°35′40″N 82°33′14″W	Asheville	
99	Sawyer Motor Company Building	Sawyer Motor Company Building	April 26, 1979 (#79001682)	100 Coxe Ave. 35°35′26″N 82°33′17″W	Asheville	
100	Schoenberger Hall	Schoenberger Hall	April 26, 1979 (#79001683)	60 Ravenscroft Dr. 35°35′25″N 82°33′12″W	Asheville	Destroyed
101	Seven Oaks	Seven Oaks	August 13, 2015 (#15000528)	82 Westwood Pl. 35°34′53″N 82°34′45″W	Asheville	
102	Sherrill's Inn	Sherrill's Inn	April 16, 1975 (#75001244)	2.5 miles south of Fairview off U.S. Route 74; 35°29′36″N 82°21′59″W	Fairview	
103	Shiloh African Methodist Episcopal Zion Church		December 9, 2022 (#100008469)	95 Shiloh Rd. 35°32′55″N 82°31′49″W	Asheville	
104	Richard Sharp Smith House	Richard Sharp Smith House	January 22, 2009 (#08001361)	655 Chunns Cove Rd. 35°37′07″N 82°31′28″W	Asheville	
105	Whitford G. Smith House	Whitford G. Smith House	May 4, 2005 (#05000375)	263 Haywood St. 35°35′41″N 82°33′43″W	Asheville	
106	Smith-McDowell House	Smith-McDowell House	August 1, 1975 (#75001243)	283 Victoria Rd. 35°34′23″N 82°33′18″W	Asheville	
107	South Asheville Cemetery and St. John ‘A’ Baptist Church	South Asheville Cemetery and St. John ‘A’ Baptist Church	September 8, 2021 (#100006903)	20 Dalton St. 35°34′52″N 82°32′18″W	Asheville	
108	South Montreat Road Historic District	South Montreat Road Historic District	December 27, 2010 (#10001056)	Along Montreat Rd., 102 1st St., 100 3rd St., 100 9th St., and 101 Beech St. 35°37′23″N 82°19′15″W	Black Mountain	
109	Southern Railway Passenger Depot	Southern Railway Passenger Depot	November 15, 1979 (#79001684)	1 Biltmore Plaza; 35°34′03″N 82°32′34″W	Asheville	
110	Spinning Wheel	Spinning Wheel	July 28, 1999 (#99000913)	1096 Hendersonville Rd. 35°32′07″N 82°31′41″W	Asheville	
111	St. Luke's Episcopal Church	St. Luke's Episcopal Church	September 30, 1997 (#97001198)	219 Chunn's Cove Rd. 35°36′07″N 82°31′53″W	Asheville	
112	St. Mary's Church	St. Mary's Church	December 23, 1994 (#94001476)	337 Charlotte St. 35°36′39″N 82°32′42″W	Asheville	
113	St. Matthias Episcopal Church	St. Matthias Episcopal Church	May 10, 1979 (#79001685)	Valley St. 35°35′30″N 82°32′54″W	Asheville	
114	Sunset Terrace Historic District	Sunset Terrace Historic District	December 16, 2005 (#05001411)	9-48 Sunset Terrace; 35°36′58″N 82°32′30″W	Asheville	
115	Thomas Chapel A.M.E. Zion Church	Thomas Chapel A.M.E. Zion Church	April 30, 2009 (#09000262)	300 Cragmont Rd. 35°37′09″N 82°21′20″W	Black Mountain	
116	Kate and Charles Noel Vance House	Kate and Charles Noel Vance House	December 20, 2016 (#16000876)	178 Sunset Dr. 35°36′47″N 82°18′43″W	Black Mountain	
117	Walton Street Park and Pool		December 14, 2023 (#100009617)	570 Walton Street; 35°34′28″N 82°33′42″W	Asheville	
118	Weaverville United Methodist Church	Weaverville United Methodist Church	March 1, 1996 (#96000195)	85 N. Main St. 35°41′57″N 82°33′37″W	Weaverville	
119	West Asheville End of Car Line Historic District	West Asheville End of Car Line Historic District	August 9, 2006 (#06000691)	Both sides of Haywood Rd. from 715 to 814 and 7-9 Brevard Rd. 35°34′41″N 82°35′39″W	Asheville	
120	West Asheville-Aycock School Historic District	West Asheville-Aycock School Historic District	August 23, 2006 (#06000718)	401-441 Haywood Rd. 35°34′42″N 82°34′53″W	Asheville	Boundary increase 2014-09-03
121	Thomas Wolfe House	Thomas Wolfe House	November 11, 1971 (#71000572)	48 Spruce St. 35°35′51″N 82°32′43″W	Asheville	
122	Young Men's Institute Building	Young Men's Institute Building	July 14, 1977 (#77000994)	Market and Eagle Sts. 35°35′38″N 82°33′01″W	Asheville	
123	Zealandia	Zealandia	March 14, 1977 (#77000995)	40 Vance Gap Rd. 35°35′47″N 82°32′21″W	Asheville	

== See also ==
- National Register of Historic Places listings in North Carolina
- List of National Historic Landmarks in North Carolina
