= Spinning wheel (disambiguation) =

A spinning wheel is a device for spinning thread or yarn.

Spinning wheel may also refer to:

- "Spinning Wheel" (song), a song by the band Blood, Sweat & Tears
- Spinning Wheel (film), a 1984 Chinese film
- Spinning wheel (animation), a type of throbber in computer graphics
- Spinning Wheel (Asheville, North Carolina), a historic building

== See also ==
- "Spinning the Wheel", a 1996 song by George Michael
- Spinning Wheels station (PAAC), a rail station
- The Spinning Wheel of Omphale, a symphonic poem by Saint-Saëns
- The Golden Spinning Wheel (Dvořák), a symphonic poem by Dvořák
- Spinning pinwheel, a computer mouse pointer busy symbol
