= Seven Oaks (Asheville, North Carolina) =

Historic house in North Carolina, United States

- U.S. National Register of Historic Places
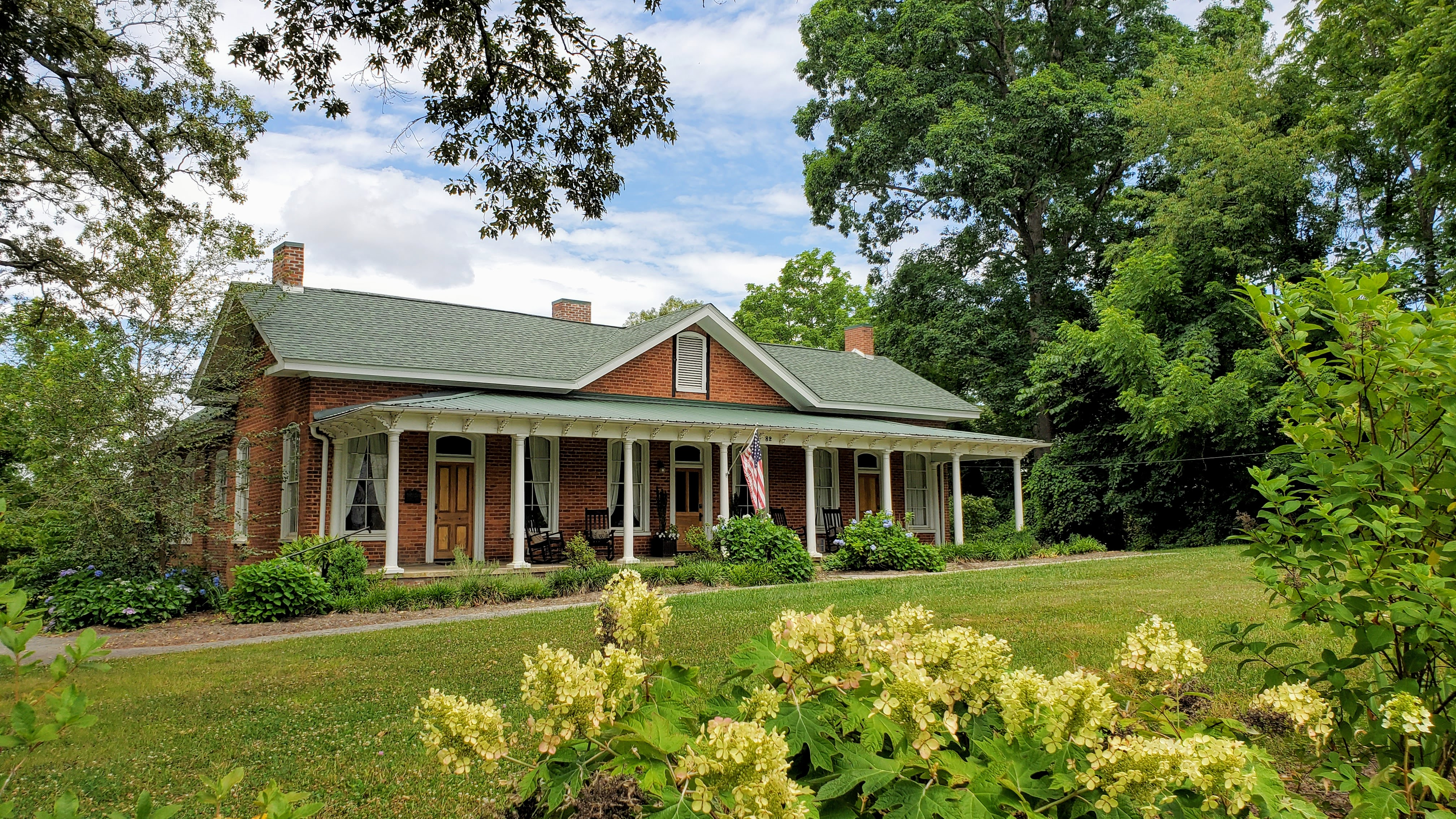
- Seven Oaks, 2021

- Location within North Carolina Location within the United States
- Location: 82 Westwood Pl., Asheville, North Carolina
- Coordinates: 35°34′52″N 82°34′44″W
- Area: 1.35 acres (0.55 ha)
- Built: 1870
- Architectural style: Italianate
- NRHP reference No.: 15000528
- Added to NRHP: August 13, 2015

Seven Oaks, also known as the Atkinson House, is a historic house at 82 Westwood Place in Asheville, North Carolina. It is a single-story brick structure, with a triple-gable roof that has deep eaves. A hip-roof porch extends across the front, supported by Tuscan columns, with modillioned and bracketed eaves. Built in the 1870s, it is a high-quality example of Italianate architecture, and is one of only seven brick 19th-century houses in Asheville.

The house was listed on the National Register of Historic Places in 2015.

== See also ==
- National Register of Historic Places listings in Buncombe County, North Carolina
