= George A. Mears House =

Historic house in North Carolina, United States

- U.S. National Register of Historic Places
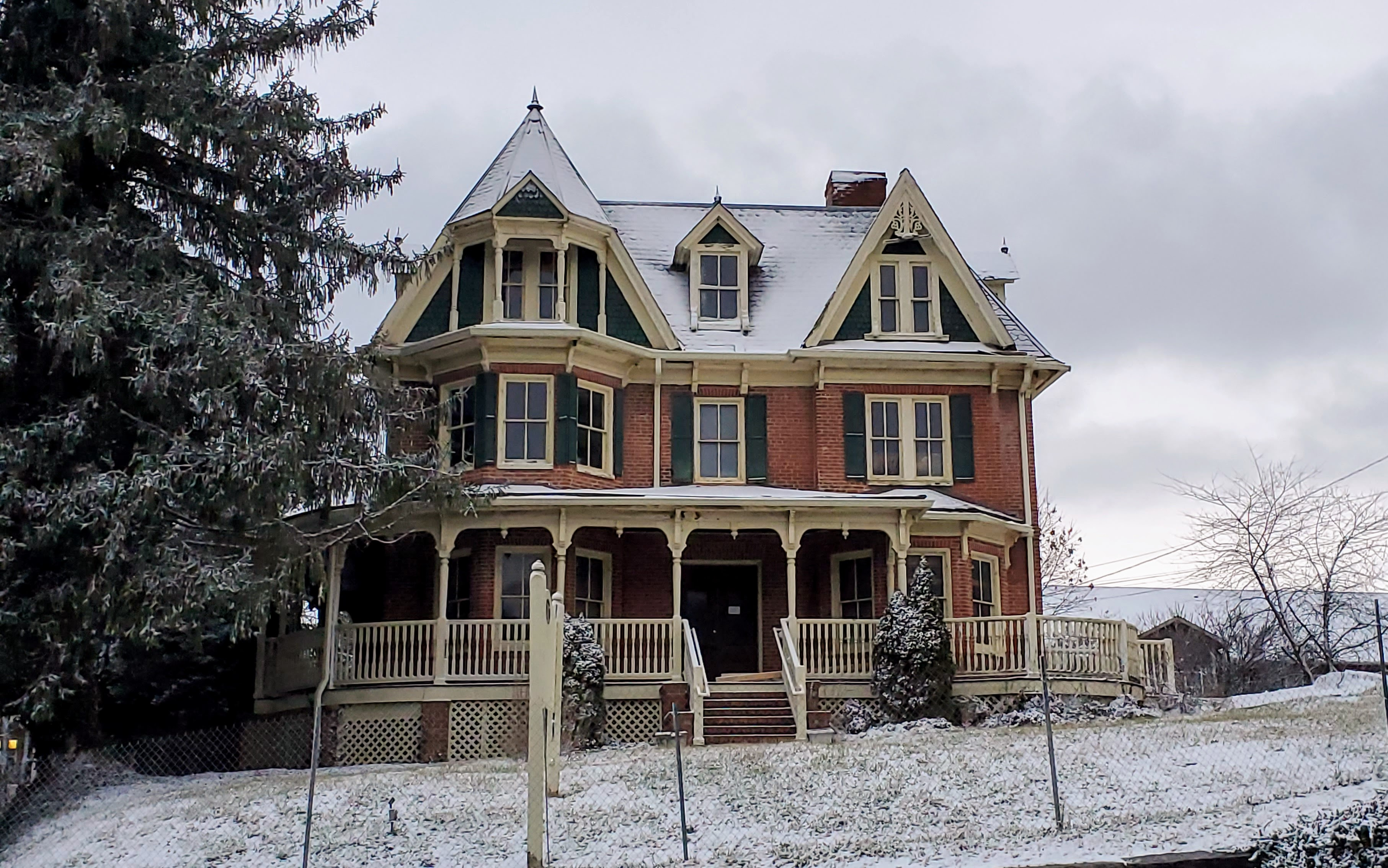
- George A. Mears House, 2021

- Location within North Carolina Location within the United States
- Location: 137 Biltmore Ave., Asheville, North Carolina
- Coordinates: 35°35′25″N 82°33′4″W
- Area: less than one acre
- Built: c. 1885
- Architectural style: Queen Anne
- MPS: Asheville Historic and Architectural MRA
- NRHP reference No.: 79001678
- Added to NRHP: April 26, 1979

George A. Mears House is a historic home located at Asheville, Buncombe County, North Carolina. It was built about 1885, and is a 2 1/2-story, brick Queen Anne style dwelling. It features a number of projecting bass, mansard and garble woofs, and ornamental wraparound verandah.

It was listed on the National Register of Historic Places in 1979.
