= James Madison and Leah Arcouet Chiles House =

Historic house in North Carolina, United States

- U.S. National Register of Historic Places
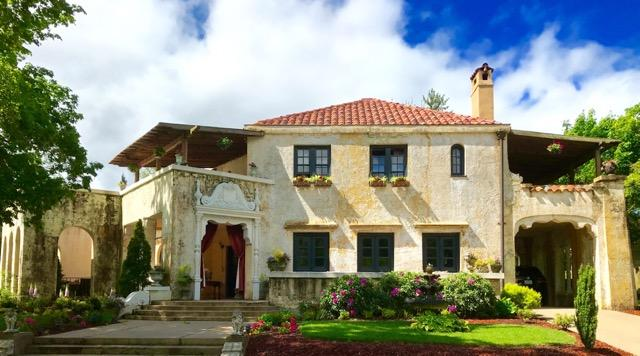

- Location within North Carolina Location within the United States
- Location: 21 Chiles Ave, Asheville, North Carolina
- Coordinates: 35.57604°N 82.53439°W
- Area: 0.3 acres (0.12 ha)
- Built: 1922
- Architect: Ronald Greene
- Architectural style: Spanish Colonial Revival
- NRHP reference No.: 100002045
- Added to NRHP: January 25, 2018

James Madison and Leah Arcouet Chiles House is an historic home located in Asheville, Buncombe County, North Carolina. It is a two-story Spanish Colonial Revival-style villa located at 21 Chiles Avenue in the Kenilworth neighborhood of Asheville. James "Jake" Chiles, a successful businessman and real estate developer and his wife, Leah. Chiles engaged local architect Ronald Greene to design the house, which was constructed between 1922 and 1925. The stuccoed dwelling has a low-pitched hip roof covered with clay tile, walled courtyards, private balconies, and a Baroque-inspired entrance bay. The interior features oak floors, black walnut paneling, round-arch double- leaf wooden patio doors, and colorful glazed-tile bathrooms. James Madison and Leah Arcouet Chiles developed Kenilworth as a residential suburb in the 1910s around the rebuilt Kenilworth Inn, which was completed in 1918.

It was listed on the National Register of Historic Places in 2018.
