= William E. Breese Sr. House =

Historic house in North Carolina, United States

- U.S. National Register of Historic Places
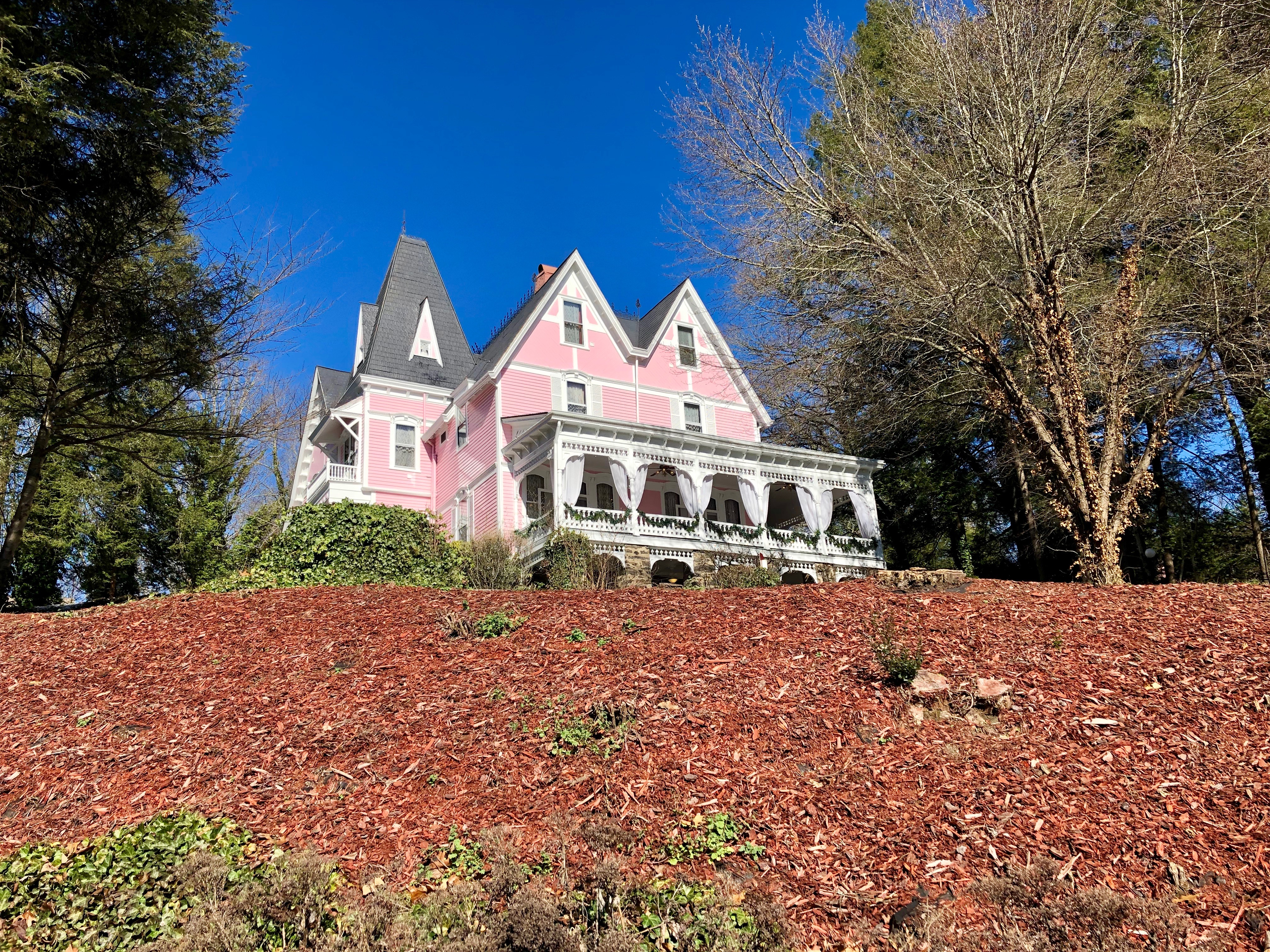
- William E. Breese Sr. House (Swannanoa Hill Mansion), January 2019

- Location within North Carolina Location within the United States
- Location: 674 Biltmore Avenue, Asheville, North Carolina
- Coordinates: 35°34′23″N 82°32′44″W
- Area: 3 acres (1.2 ha)
- Built: 1891
- Architect: Leonard, Charles B.
- Architectural style: Queen Anne
- NRHP reference No.: 80002803
- Added to NRHP: April 28, 1980

William E. Breese Sr. House is a historic house located at 674 Biltmore Avenue in Asheville, Buncombe County, North Carolina.

== Description and history ==
It was built in 1891 by architect Charles B. Leonard, and is a 2 1/2-story, rectangular timber-framed dwelling in the Queen Anne style. It features an off-center entrance tower with a steeply pitched pyramidal roof. The building housed a sanatorium, called Sherwood Sanatorium, from around 1927 to 1932. After 1939, the building housed a tourist home known as Cedar Crest.

It was listed on the National Register of Historic Places on April 28, 1980.
