= Sunset Terrace Historic District =

Historic district in North Carolina, United States

- U.S. National Register of Historic Places
- U.S. Historic district
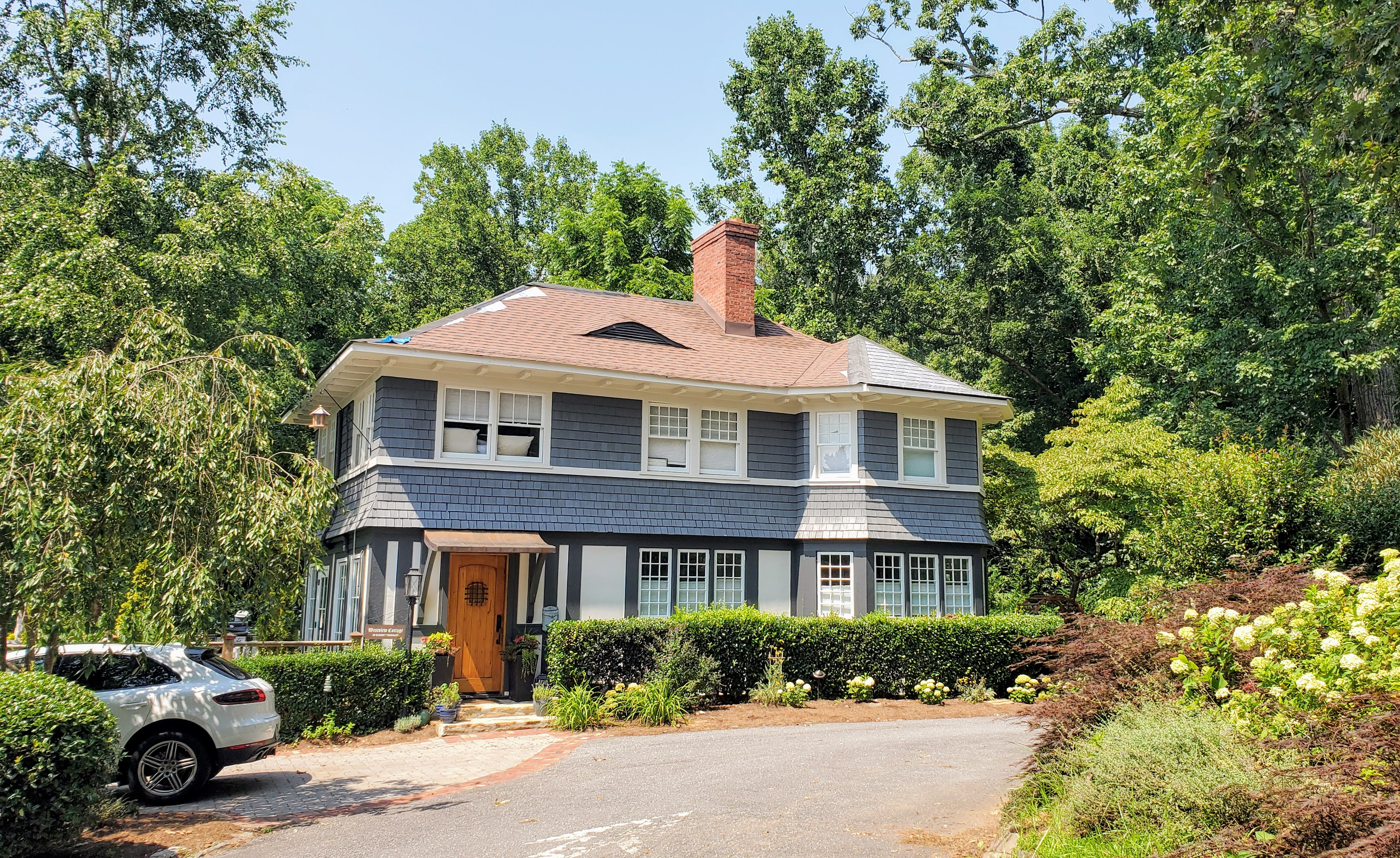
- Westview Cottage, 2021

- Location within North Carolina Location within the United States
- Location: 9-48 Sunset Terrace, Asheville, North Carolina
- Coordinates: 35°36′58″N 82°32′30″W
- Area: 2.3 acres (0.93 ha)
- Built: 1913
- Architect: Parker, Charles N.; Parker, Harry L.
- Architectural style: Tudor Revival, Bungalow/craftsman
- NRHP reference No.: 05001411
- Added to NRHP: December 16, 2005

Sunset Terrace Historic District is a national historic district located at Asheville, Buncombe County, North Carolina. The district encompasses nine contributing buildings in a residential section of Asheville. The property was developed after 1913, and includes representative examples of Tudor Revival and Bungalow style dwellings. Notable dwellings include the Rosemary Cottage (1913), Primrose Cottage (1913), Rambler Cottage (1915), Westview Cottage (1915), and Violet Cottage (1920).

It was listed on the National Register of Historic Places in 2005.

== Gallery ==
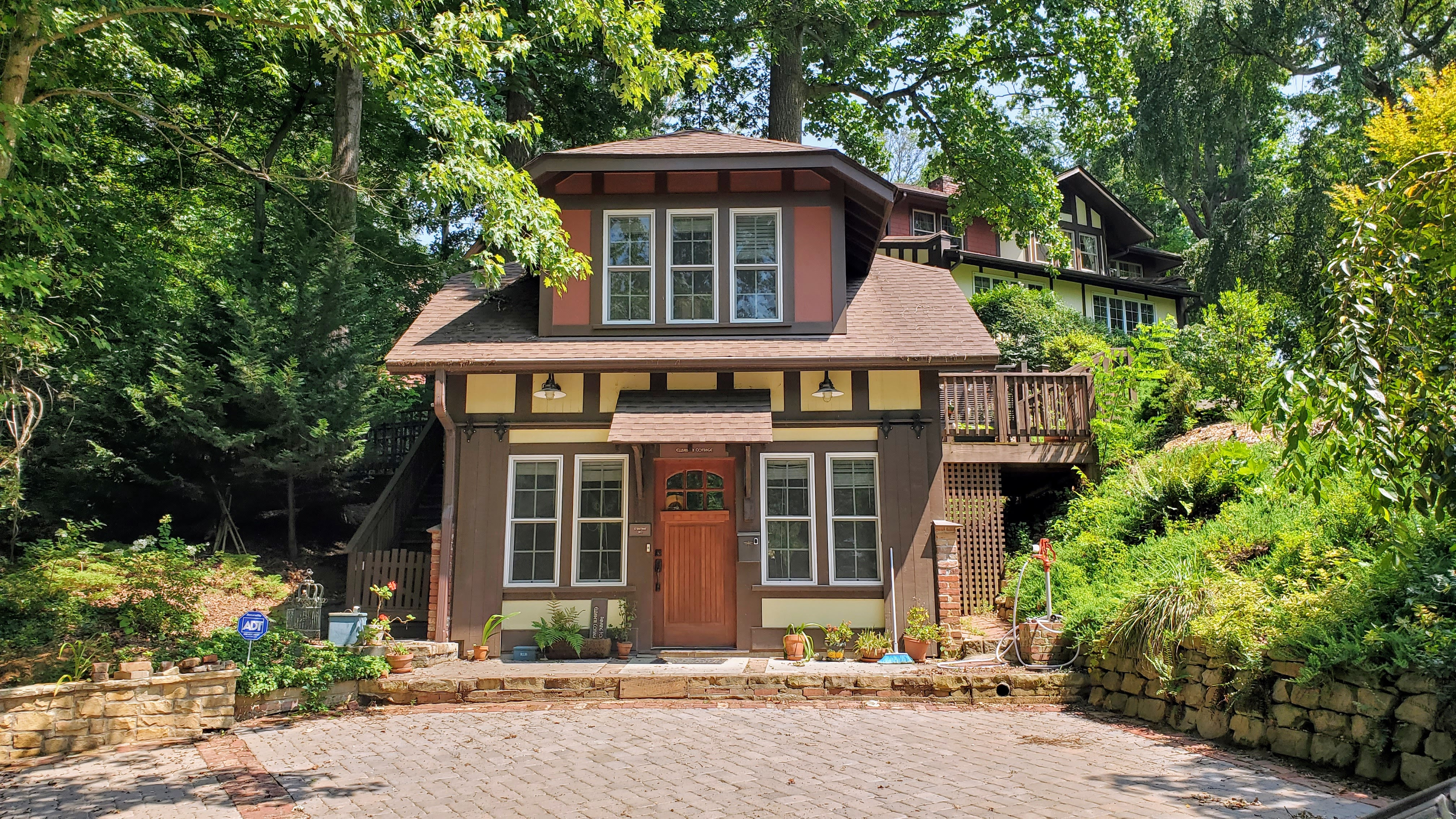
Rosemary Cottage Garage, 2021

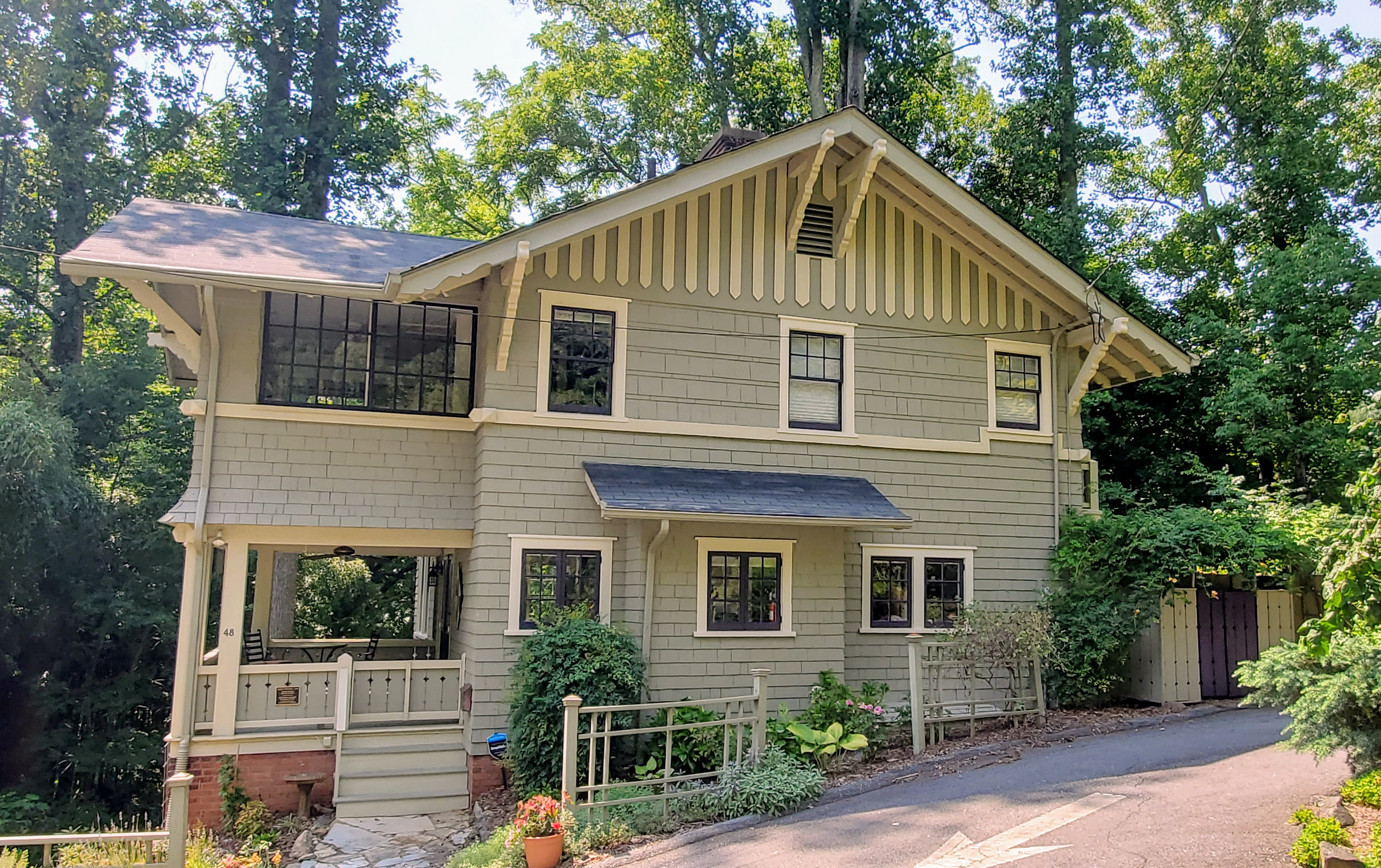
Viloet Cottage, 2021
