= Claxton School =

Historic school building in North Carolina, United States

- Claxton Elementary School
- U.S. National Register of Historic Places
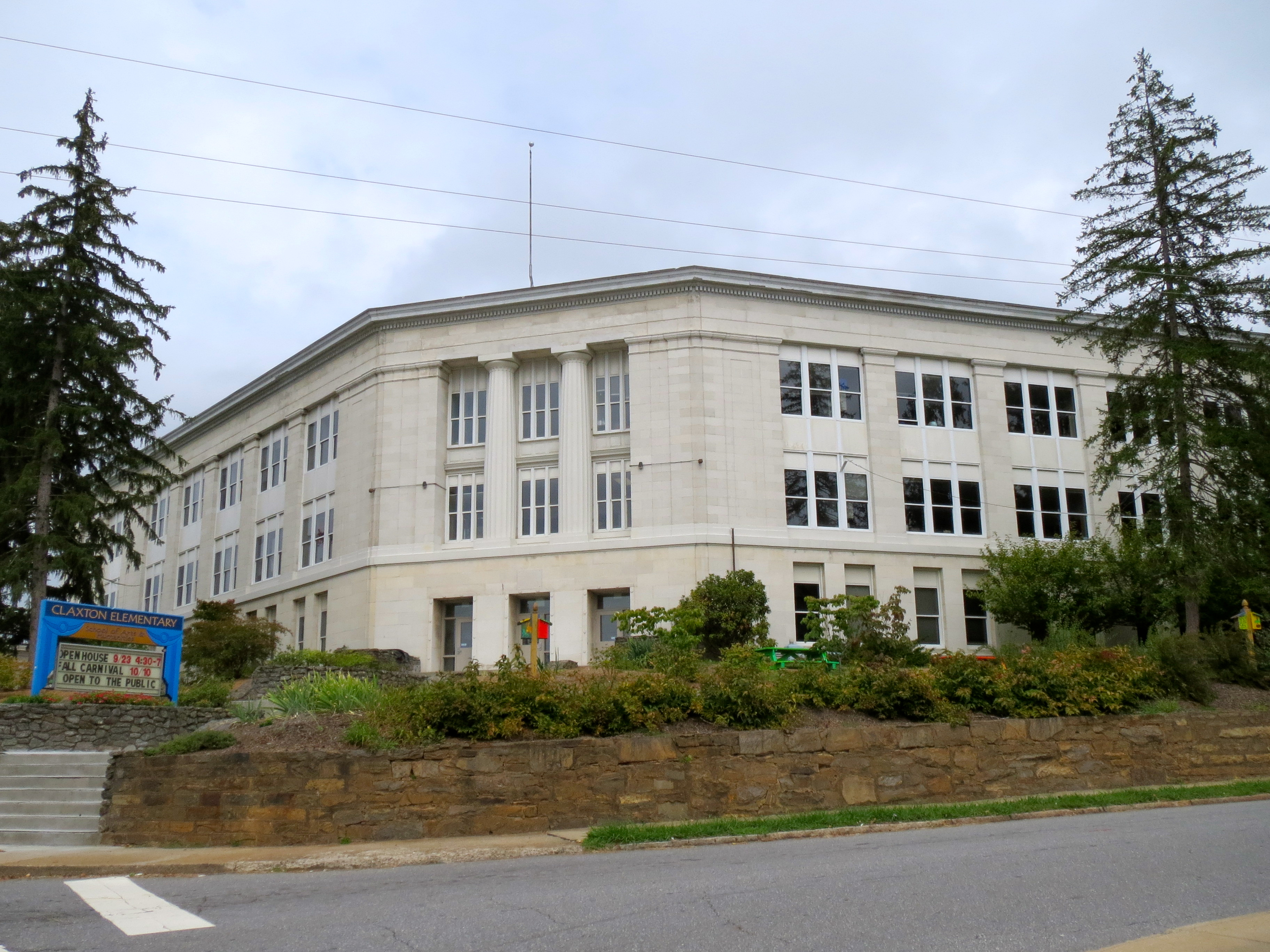
- Claxton Elementary School, September 2014

- Location within North Carolina Location within the United States
- Location: 241 Merrimon Ave., Asheville, North Carolina
- Coordinates: 35°36′28″N 82°33′13″W
- Area: 4.3 acres (1.7 ha)
- Built: 1922-1925
- Architect: Greene, Ronald; Sayre, C. Gadsen
- Architectural style: Classical Revival
- NRHP reference No.: 92000671
- Added to NRHP: June 4, 1992

Claxton School is a historic school building located at Asheville, Buncombe County, North Carolina. It was built in 1922–1925, and is a three-story, Neoclassical school building constructed of hollow clay tile. It is faced with cast concrete stone veneer. The original two-story auditorium is located at the rear of the building.

It was listed on the National Register of Historic Places in 1992.
