= Thomas Jarrett House =

Historic house in North Carolina, United States

- U.S. National Register of Historic Places
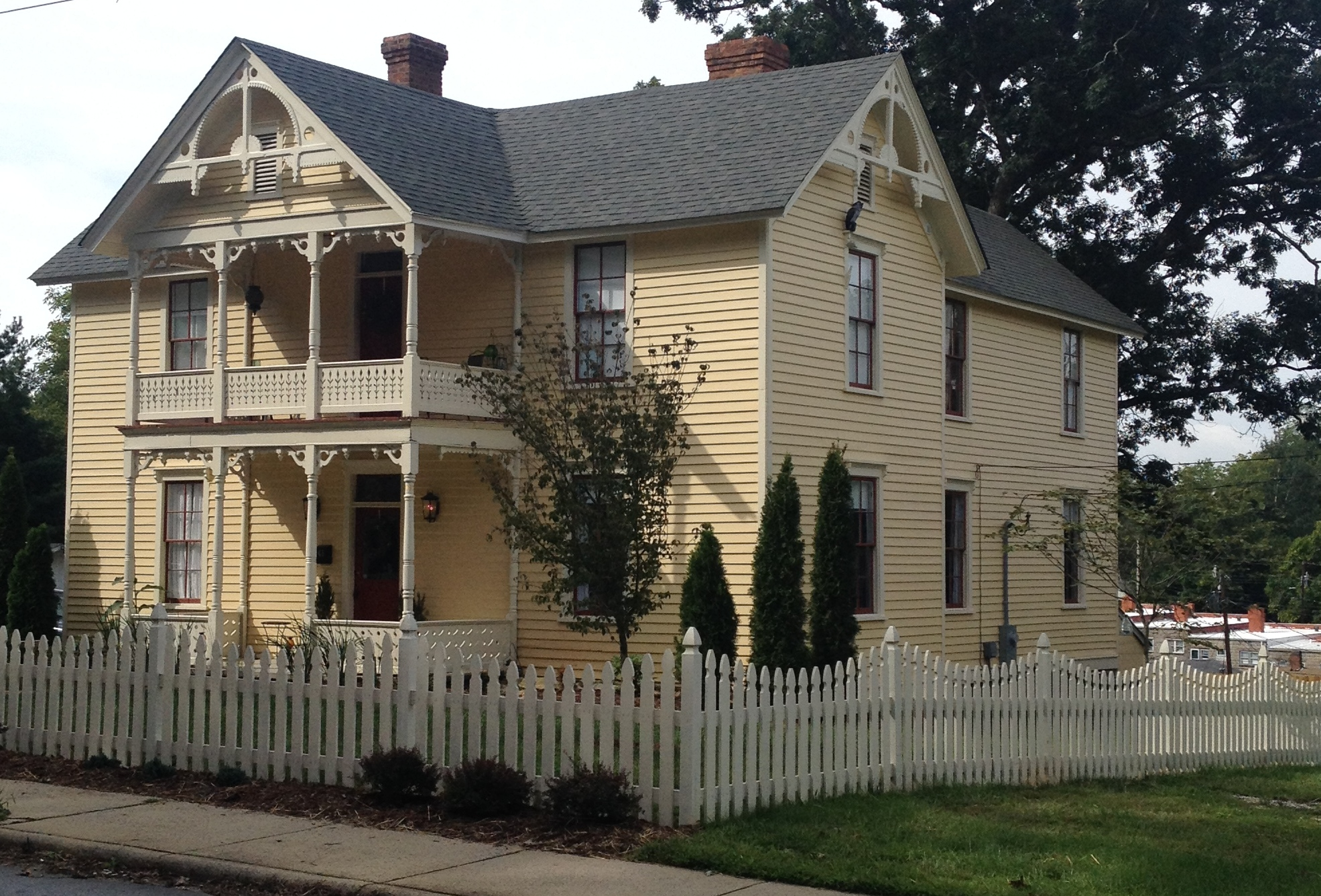

- Location within North Carolina Location within the United States
- Location: 46 Louisiana Ave., Asheville, North Carolina
- Coordinates: 35°34′47″N 82°35′28″W
- Area: 2 acres (0.81 ha)
- Built: 1894
- Built by: Jarrett, Thomas
- Architectural style: Queen Anne, I-House
- NRHP reference No.: 93001535
- Added to NRHP: January 21, 1994

Thomas Jarrett House is a historic home located at 46 Louisiana Avenue in Asheville, Buncombe County, North Carolina. It was built in 1894, and is a two-story, frame I-house in the Queen Anne style. It is sheathed in weatherboard and features a two-tiered, lavishly decorated portico.

It was listed on the National Register of Historic Places in 1994.
