= Conabeer Chrysler Building =

Historic commercial building in North Carolina, US

- U.S. National Register of Historic Places
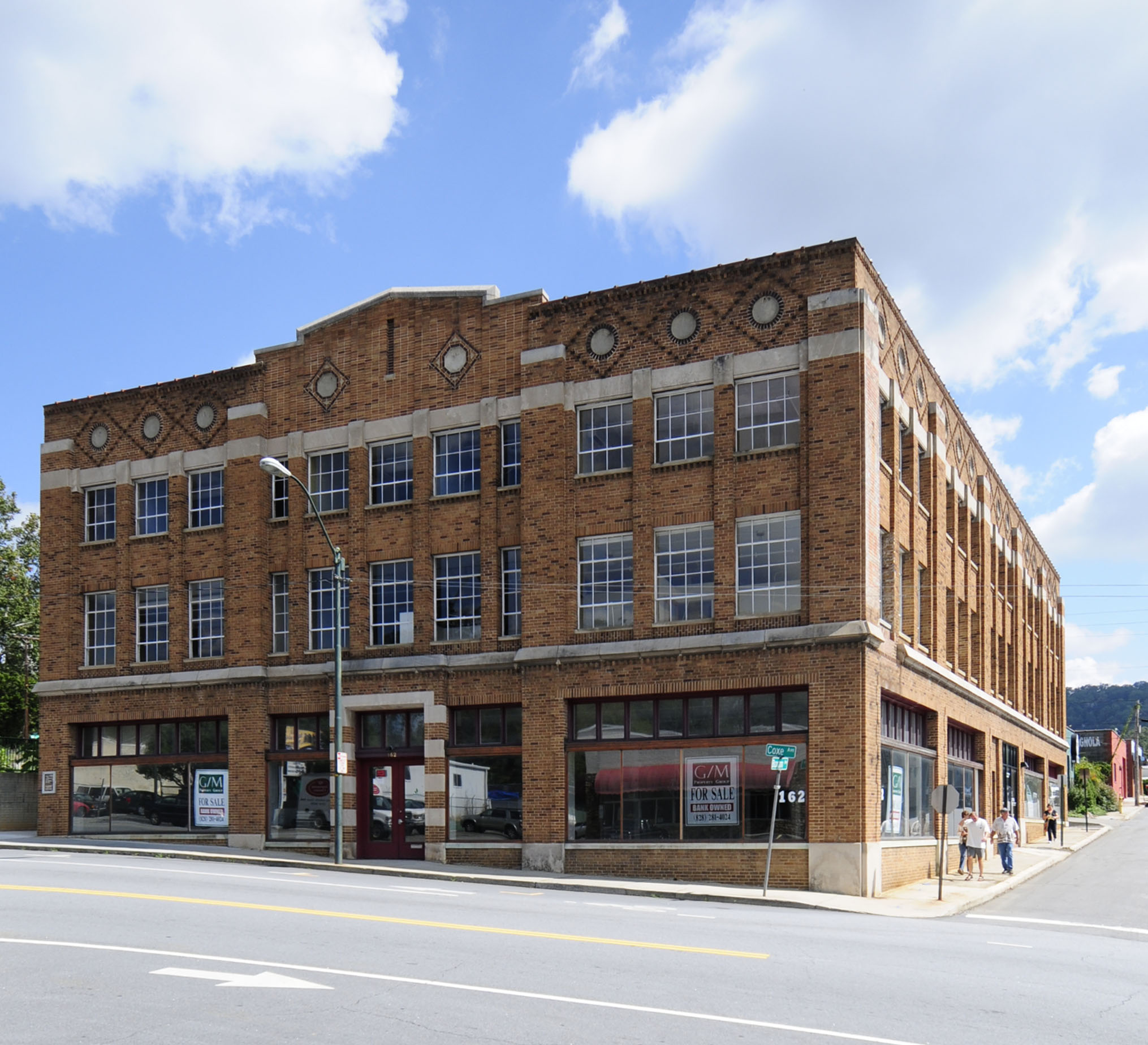
- Conabeer Chrysler Building, September 2012

- Location within North Carolina Location within the United States
- Location: 162-164 Coxe Ave., Asheville, North Carolina
- Coordinates: 35°35′18″N 82°33′17″W
- Area: less than one acre
- Built: 1928
- Architect: Beacham & LeGrand
- MPS: Asheville Historic and Architectural MRA
- NRHP reference No.: 79001675
- Added to NRHP: April 26, 1979

Conabeer Chrysler Building is a historic auto showroom located at Asheville, Buncombe County, North Carolina. It was built in 1928, and is a three-story steel frame building faced in orange brick and limestone. It features a tall decorated parapet. The building was erected as a new home for the Conabeer Motor Company, the local Chrysler agency.

It was listed on the National Register of Historic Places in 1979.

This building now houses a Well Played, a board game café
