= Biltmore–Oteen Bank Building =

- U.S. National Register of Historic Places
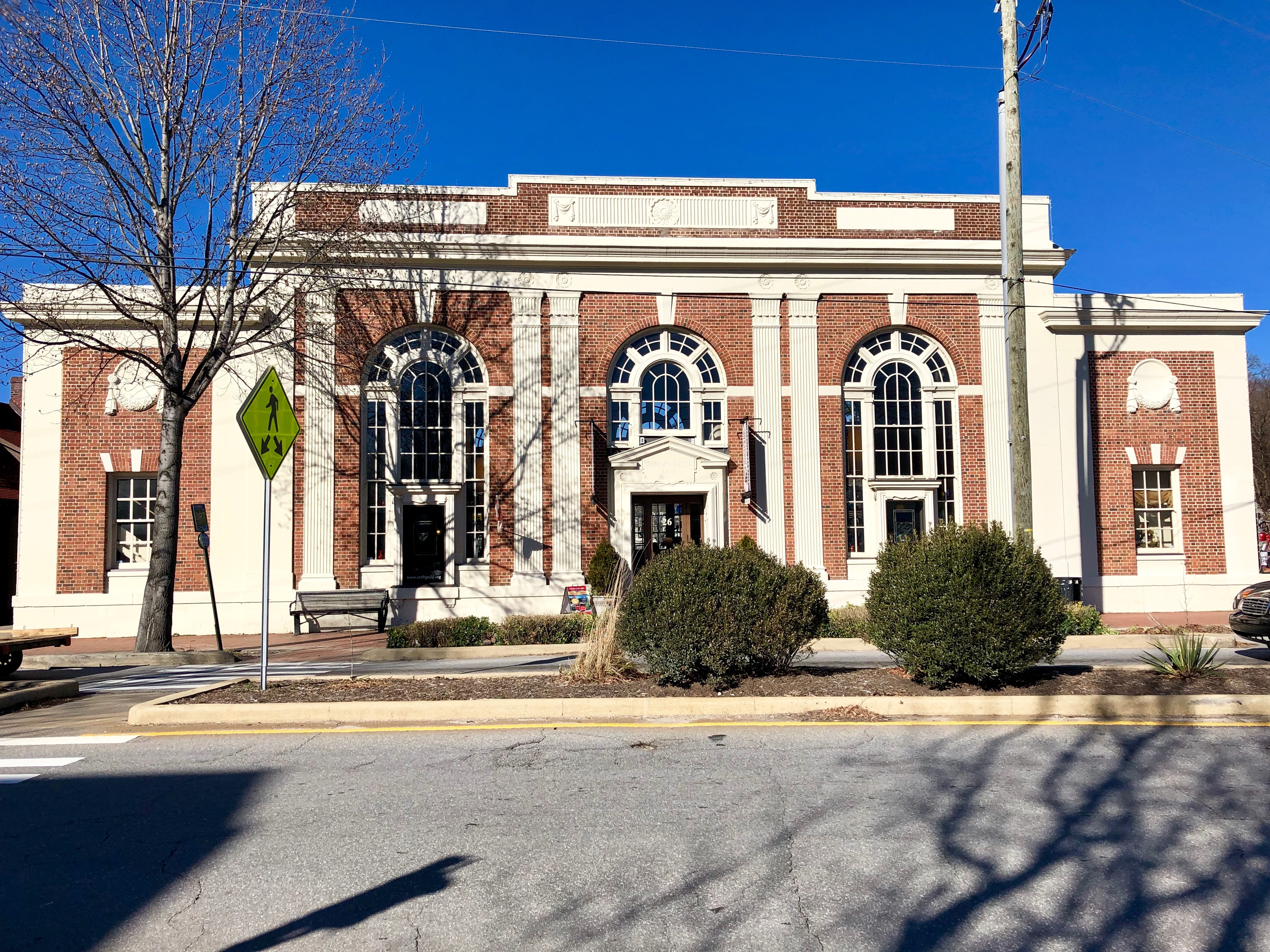
- Biltmore–Oteen Bank Building, January 2019

- Location within North Carolina Location within the United States
- Location: 12 Lodge St., Asheville, North Carolina
- Coordinates: 35°34′3″N 82°32′34″W
- Area: less than one acre
- Built: 1925
- Architectural style: Colonial Revival, Georgian Revival
- MPS: Biltmore Village MRA
- NRHP reference No.: 79001673
- Added to NRHP: November 15, 1979

Biltmore–Oteen Bank Building is a historic bank building located at Biltmore Village, Asheville, Buncombe County, North Carolina. It was built between 1925 and 1930, and is a two-story, brick building with Colonial Revival / Georgian Revival design details. It is a thin, wedge-shaped building featuring concrete detail and Doric order type pilasters.

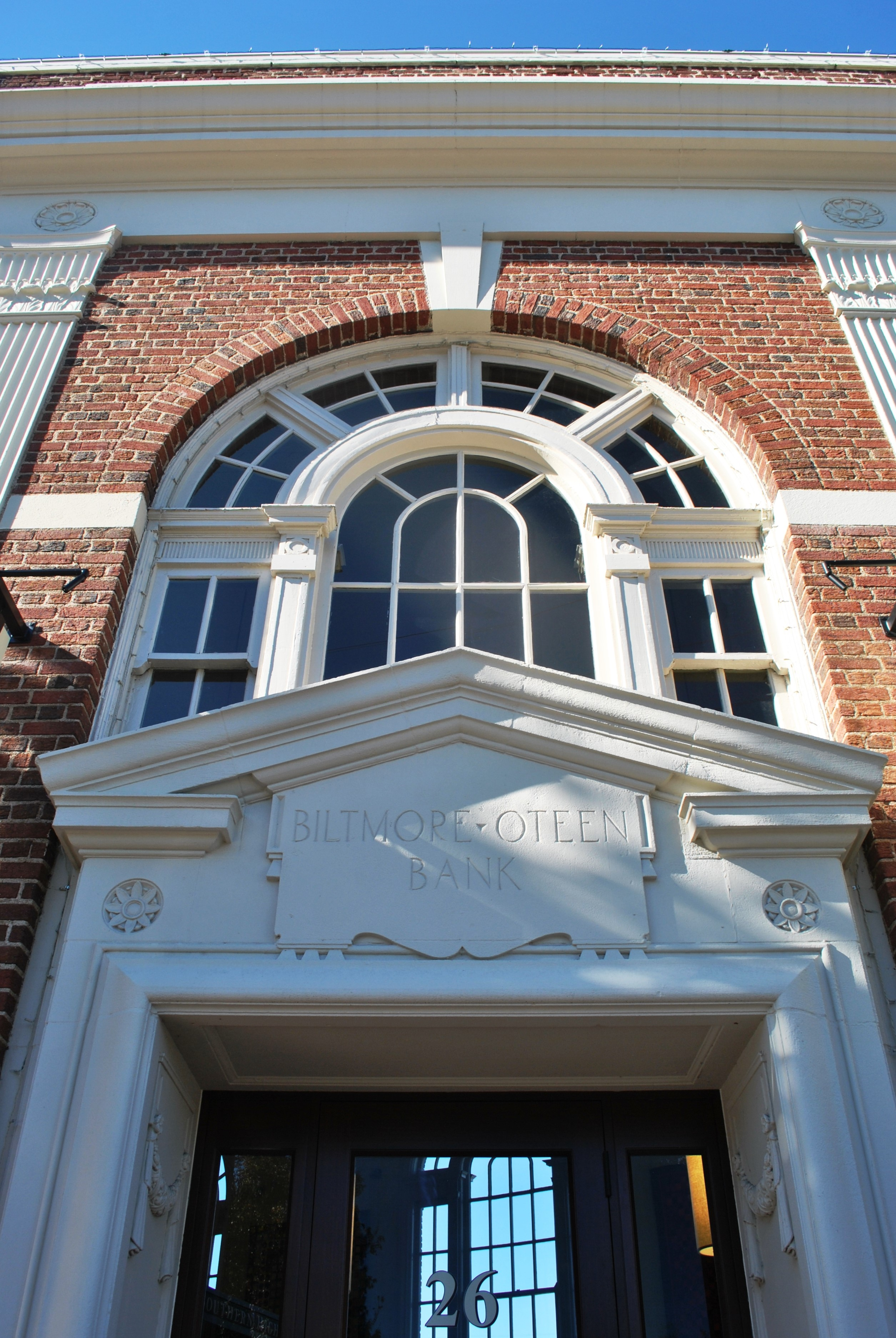
Biltmore–Oteen Bank Building

It was listed on the National Register of Historic Places in 1979.
