= Samuel Harrison Reed House =

Historic house in North Carolina, United States

- U.S. National Register of Historic Places
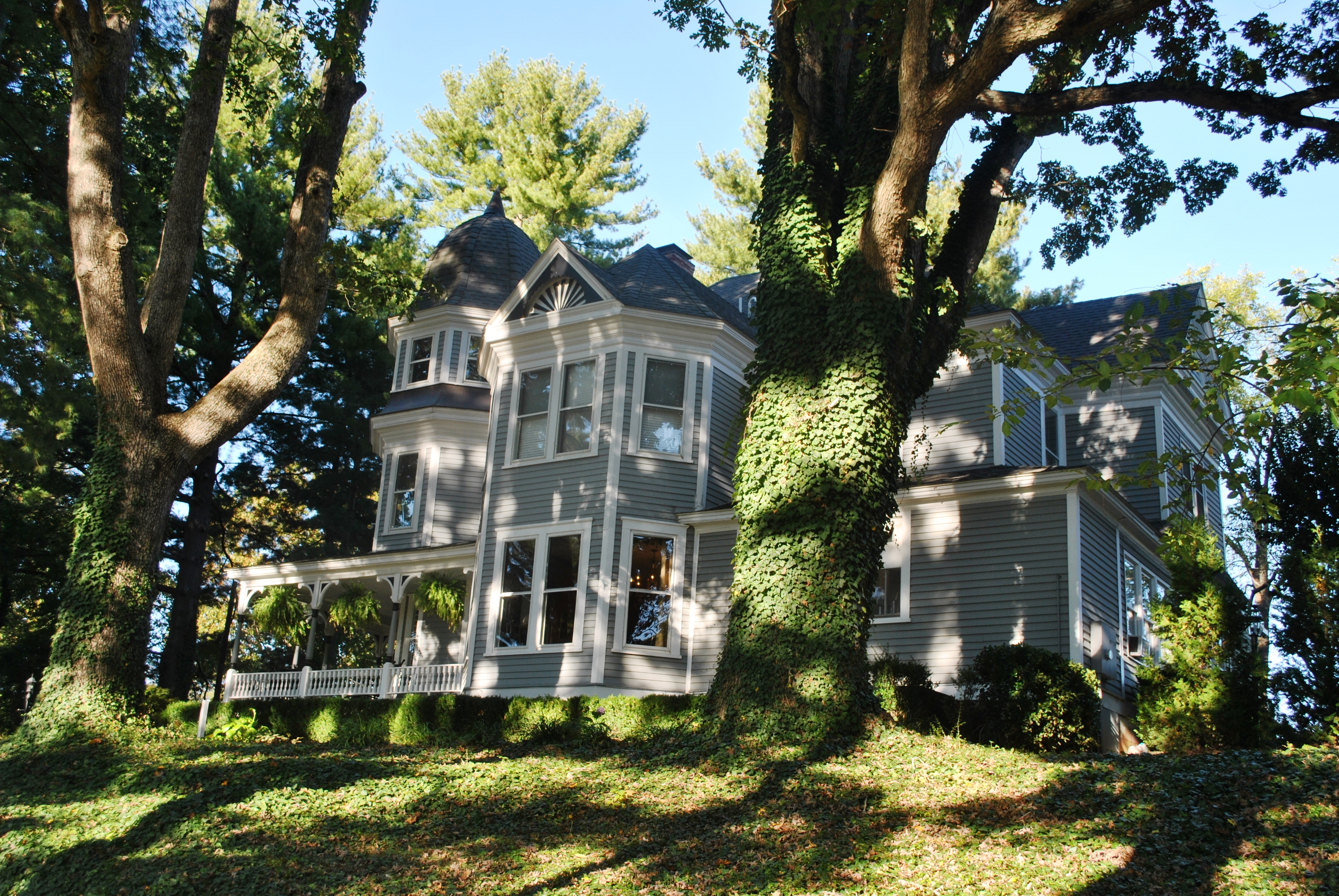

- Location within North Carolina Location within the United States
- Location: 119 Dodge St., Asheville, North Carolina
- Coordinates: 35°33′51″N 82°32′22″W
- Area: 1 acre (0.40 ha)
- Built: 1892
- Architectural style: Queen Anne
- MPS: Biltmore Village MRA
- NRHP reference No.: 79001680
- Added to NRHP: November 15, 1979

Samuel Harrison Reed House is a historic home located at Biltmore Village, Asheville, Buncombe County, North Carolina. It was built in 1892, and is a Queen Anne style dwelling.

It was listed on the National Register of Historic Places in 1979.
