= Building at 130–132 Biltmore Avenue =

- U.S. National Register of Historic Places
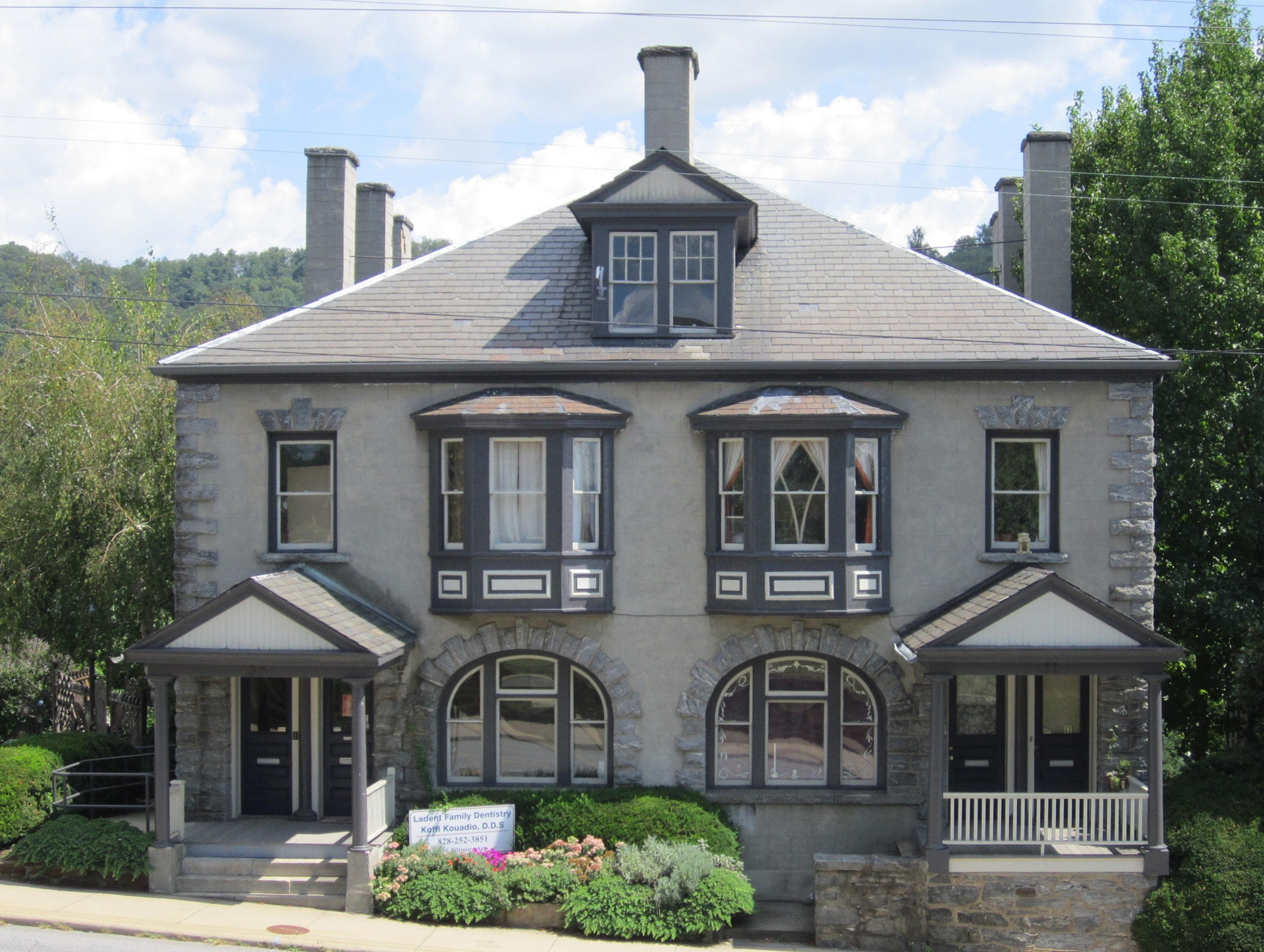
- Building at 130–132 Biltmore Avenue, September 2012

- Location within North Carolina Location within the United States
- Location: 130–132 Biltmore Ave., Asheville, North Carolina
- Coordinates: 35°35′25″N 82°33′4″W
- Area: less than one acre
- Built: 1905
- Architectural style: English Queen Anne
- MPS: Asheville Historic and Architectural MRA
- NRHP reference No.: 79003323
- Added to NRHP: April 26, 1979

Building at 130–132 Biltmore Avenue is a historic residential building located at Asheville, Buncombe County, North Carolina. It is one of a row of granite apartment buildings on the lower end of Biltmore Avenue. It was built in 1905, and is a two-story, uncoursed rubble granite apartment building with a high, slate-shingled mansard roof in an English Queen Anne style. It features three tall chimney stacks on either side elevation.

It was listed on the National Register of Historic Places in 1979.
