= Dr. Carl V. Reynolds House =

Historic house in North Carolina, United States

- U.S. National Register of Historic Places
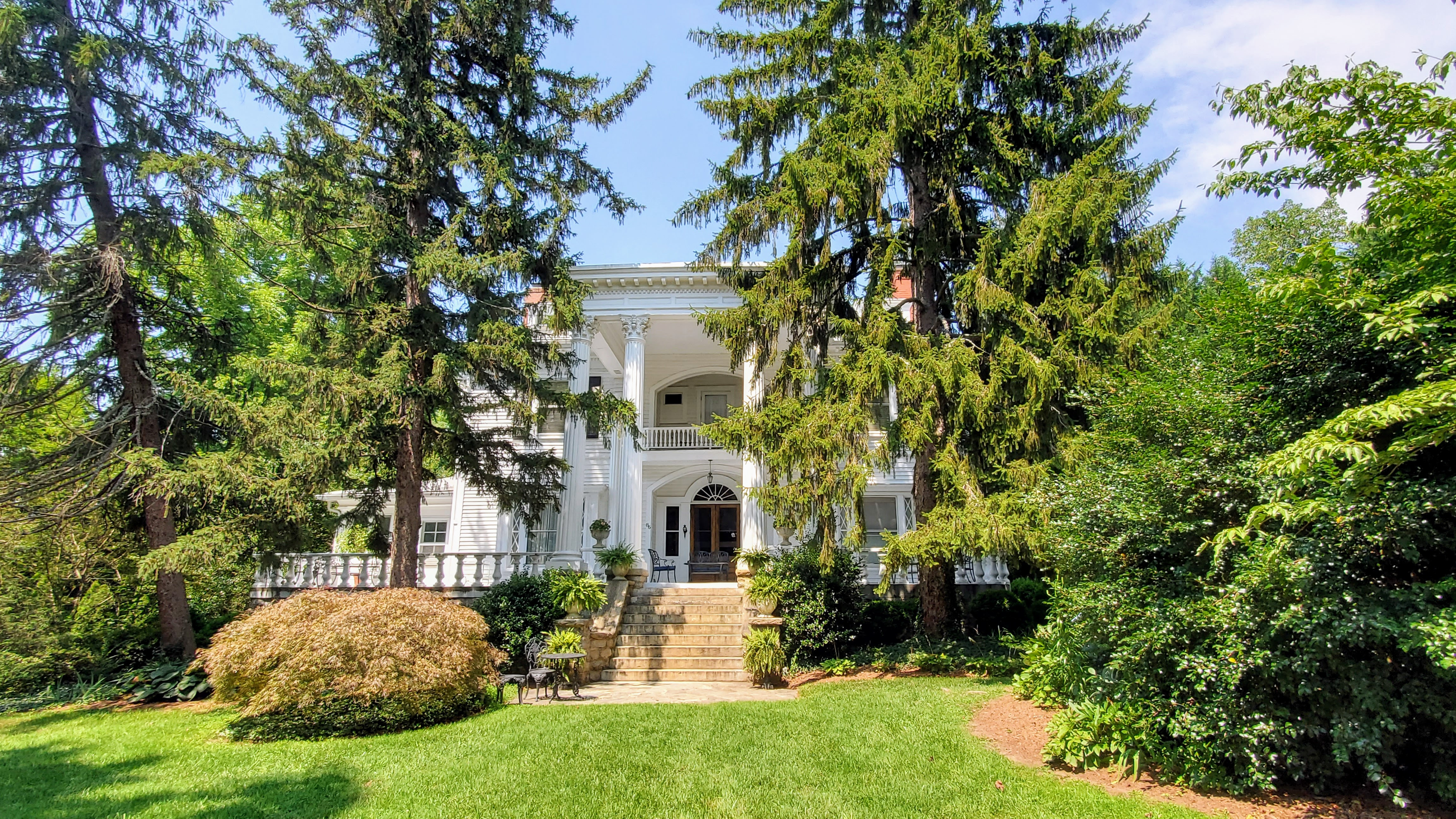
- Dr. Carl V. Reynolds House, 2021

- Location within North Carolina Location within the United States
- Location: 86 Edgemont Rd., Asheville, North Carolina
- Coordinates: 35°36′52″N 82°32′32″W
- Area: 2 acres (0.81 ha)
- Built: 1909
- Architectural style: Classical Revival, Neo-Classical Revival
- NRHP reference No.: 82003436
- Added to NRHP: August 19, 1982

Dr. Carl V. Reynolds House, now known as the Albemarle Inn, is a historic home located at Asheville, Buncombe County, North Carolina. It was built in 1909, and is a three-story, square frame dwelling in the Colonial Revival / Neoclassical style. It features a flat roofed portico with pairs of fluted Corinthian order columns and half-round pilasters. The home was converted into apartments in the 1940s and now houses an inn.

It was listed on the National Register of Historic Places in 1982.
