= Ottari Sanitarium =

Historic apartments and former hospital in North Carolina, US

- U.S. National Register of Historic Places
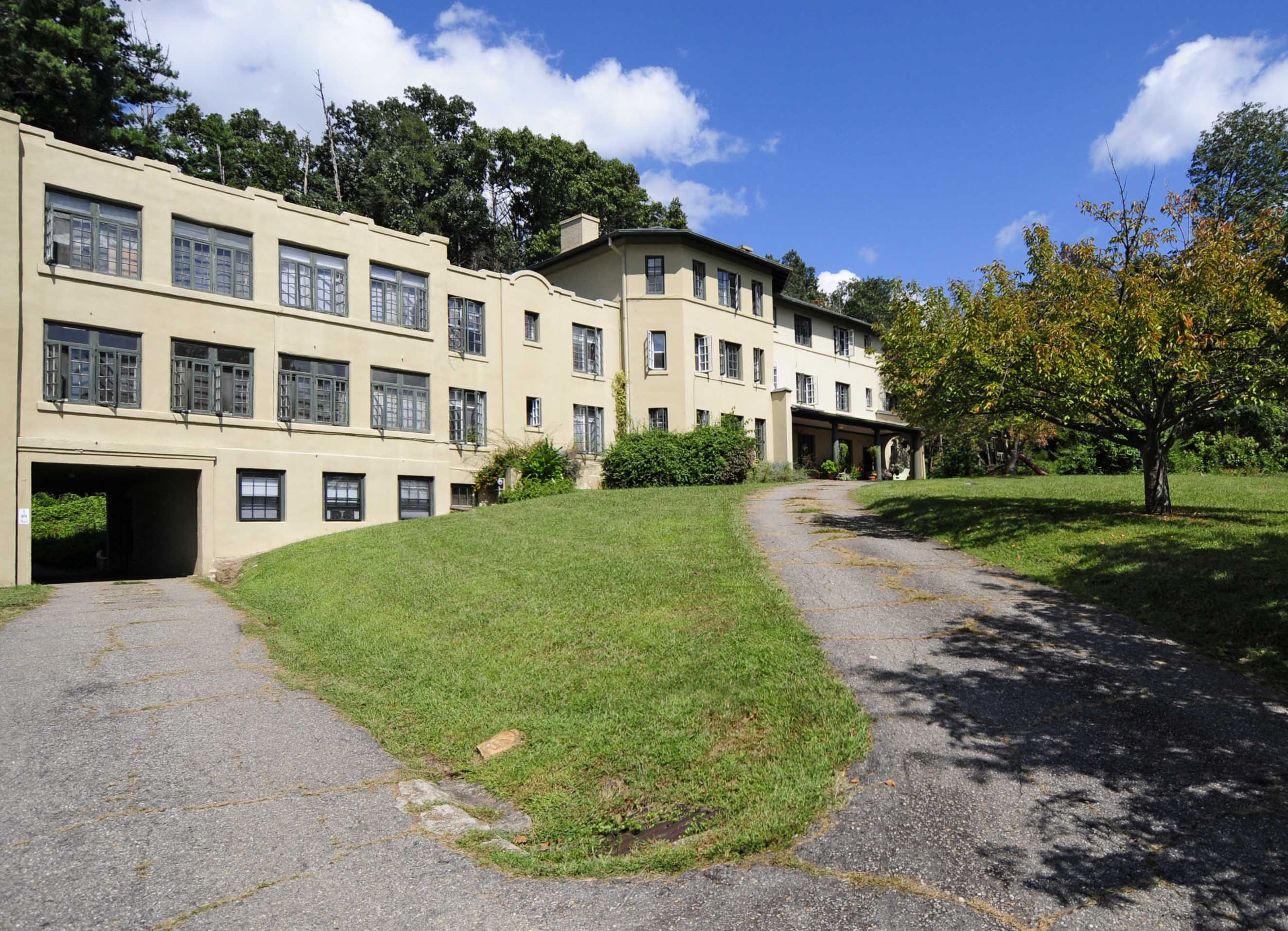
- Ottari Sanatarium, September 2012

- Location within North Carolina Location within the United States
- Location: 491 Kimberly Ave., Asheville, North Carolina
- Coordinates: 35°37′45″N 82°32′49″W
- Area: 3 acres (1.2 ha)
- Built: 1912, 1923
- NRHP reference No.: 86002876
- Added to NRHP: October 16, 1986

Ottari Sanitarium, also known as the Coburn Apartments, is a historic building complex located at 491 Kimberly Avenue in Asheville, Buncombe County, North Carolina. The original section was built in 1912, and now forms the east end of the building. It is a three-story, stuccoed brick building with a hipped roof. It was enlarged in 1923, with the addition of a three-story, 14 bay brick addition, connected to the original building by a two-story section. The building was converted to apartments in 1937.

It was listed on the National Register of Historic Places in 1986.

== History ==
The Ottari Sanitarium (named for nearby Ottari Rd.) was built in 1912 by Dr. William Banks Meacham, a doctor of Osteopathy. In the late nineteenth and early twentieth century, the Asheville area was known as a health resort. It was believed that the fresh mountain air could alleviate lung diseases such as tuberculosis. When the facility opened in 1912 there were rooms and suites (with open porches) for eighteen patients. An additional twenty rooms were built in 1923.

In a 1917 letter published in Osteopathic Truth, Dr. M.J. Carson of the North Carolina Osteopathic Society described the sanitarium:

...Building fire-proof, interior trim white, glass knobs to doors, each room with private tiled bath, "anatomic" closet seats of non-stainable ivory; cross transom ventilation, door and two windows opening on private screened porch. Call bells in each room, indirect lighting, furniture and rugs of private home and not like hotel or hospital. Meals served individually by maids, nurses and butler dressed in white, with dainty china and neat silver..."

By the end of the 1920s, Dr. Meacham found himself financially overextended, and the sanitarium closed in 1930. The City of Asheville and the Buncombe County Commission acquired the property in 1933, and arranged with a local realtor to convert it into apartments. The Kimberly Apartments opened in 1937. In 1940 the apartments were sold to Harry Cutler Coburn, who renamed the complex the Coburn Apartments. The building remains in apartment use in 2020.
