= Building at 134–136½ Biltmore Avenue =

- Building at 134–136 1/2 Biltmore Avenue
- U.S. National Register of Historic Places
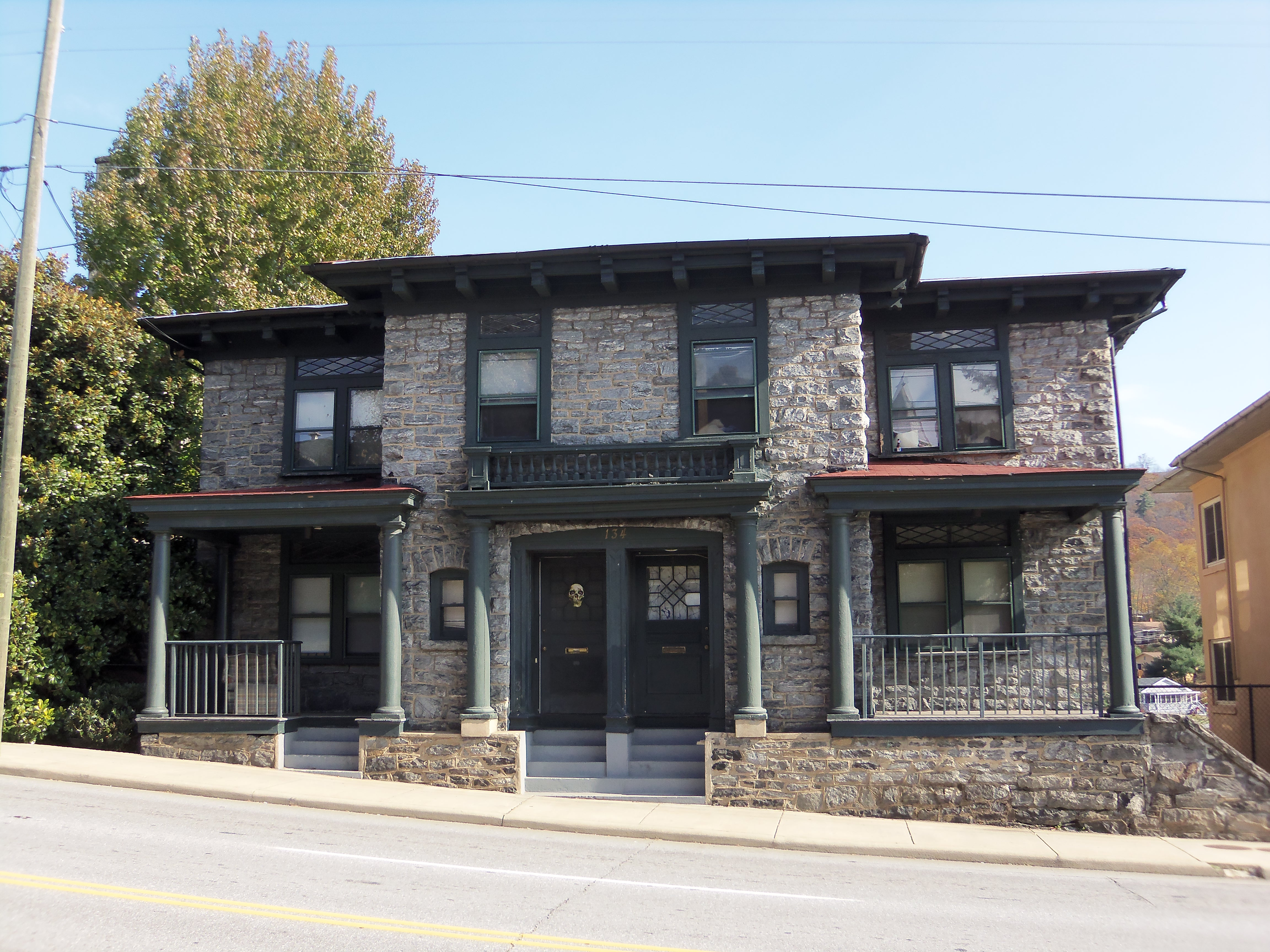
- Building at 134–136 1/2 Biltmore Avenue, November 2012

- Location within North Carolina Location within the United States
- Location: 134–136 1/2 Biltmore Ave., Asheville, North Carolina
- Coordinates: 35°35′25″N 82°33′4″W
- Area: less than one acre
- Built: 1905
- Architectural style: English Italianate Revival
- MPS: Asheville Historic and Architectural MRA
- NRHP reference No.: 79003324
- Added to NRHP: April 26, 1979

Building at 134–136 1/2 Biltmore Avenue is a historic residential building located at Asheville, Buncombe County, North Carolina. It is one of a row of granite apartment buildings on the lower end of Biltmore Avenue. It was built in 1905, and is a two-story, uncoursed rubble granite apartment building with a coursed, rock-faced granite front facade in an English Italianate Revival style. It features a low, hipped roof with three, tall brick chimneys.

It was listed on the National Register of Historic Places in 1979.
