= Eliada Home =

Historic district in North Carolina, United States

- U.S. National Register of Historic Places
- U.S. Historic district
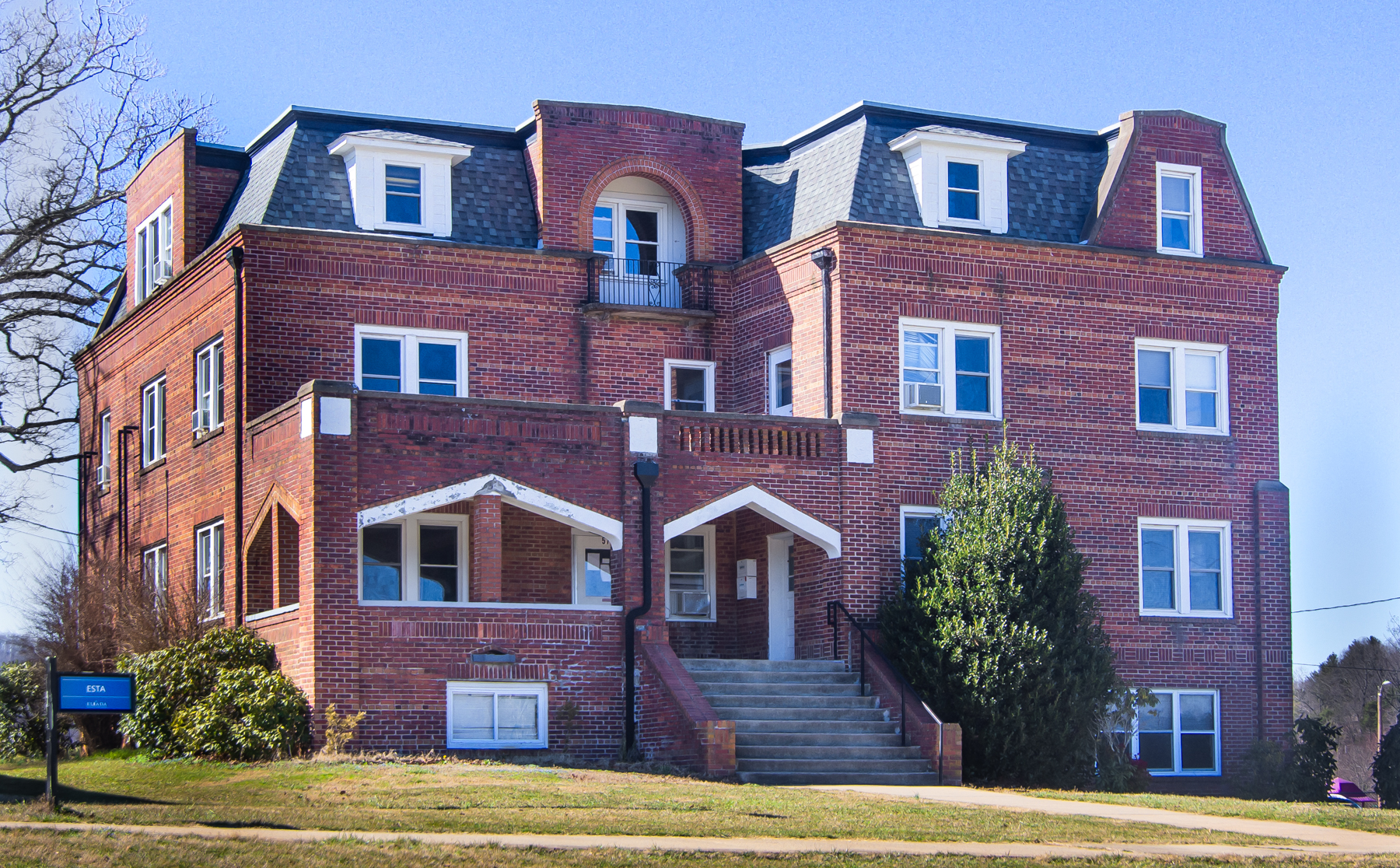
- Allred Cottage, 2021

- Location within North Carolina Location within the United States
- Location: 2 Compton Dr., near Asheville, North Carolina
- Coordinates: 35°36′08″N 82°37′08″W
- Area: 25 acres (10 ha)
- Built: 1915
- Architect: Davis, Thomas E.; Bordner, Floyd W.
- Architectural style: Colonial Revival, Bungalow/craftsman, Tudor Revival
- NRHP reference No.: 93000314
- Added to NRHP: April 22, 1993

Eliada Home is a national historic district located near Asheville, Buncombe County, North Carolina. The district originally encompassed ten contributing buildings and three contributing sites associated with a youth home complex in suburban Asheville. Of the original ten, only five remain. They include the early residential, administrative, and agricultural buildings of the home as well as a residence, a tabernacle site, a log guest cabin, and a cemetery. The primary buildings were the Main Building (built in 1915, but is no longer extant) and the Allred Cottage (1930). The buildings included representative examples of the Colonial Revival, Bungalow, Bungalow/craftsman, and Tudor Revival styles.

It was listed on the National Register of Historic Places in 1993.

== Modern use ==
The Eliada Home site is used as the headquarters of the non-profit child services agency Eliada. Eliada began as an orphanage in 1905, and began to provide foster care services some years later. Now, Eliada offers both foster and educational services for children in North Carolina.

In February 2021, the North Carolina Department of Health and Human Services ordered Eliada to shut down two of its cottages for high-risk teenagers, stating that those cottages presented "an imminent danger to the health, safety and welfare of the clients". The department cited issues going back to 2018, including teens running away, high staff turnover, an instance of sexual relations between a staff member and a client, and an instance of rape not being reported to the police.

== Gallery ==
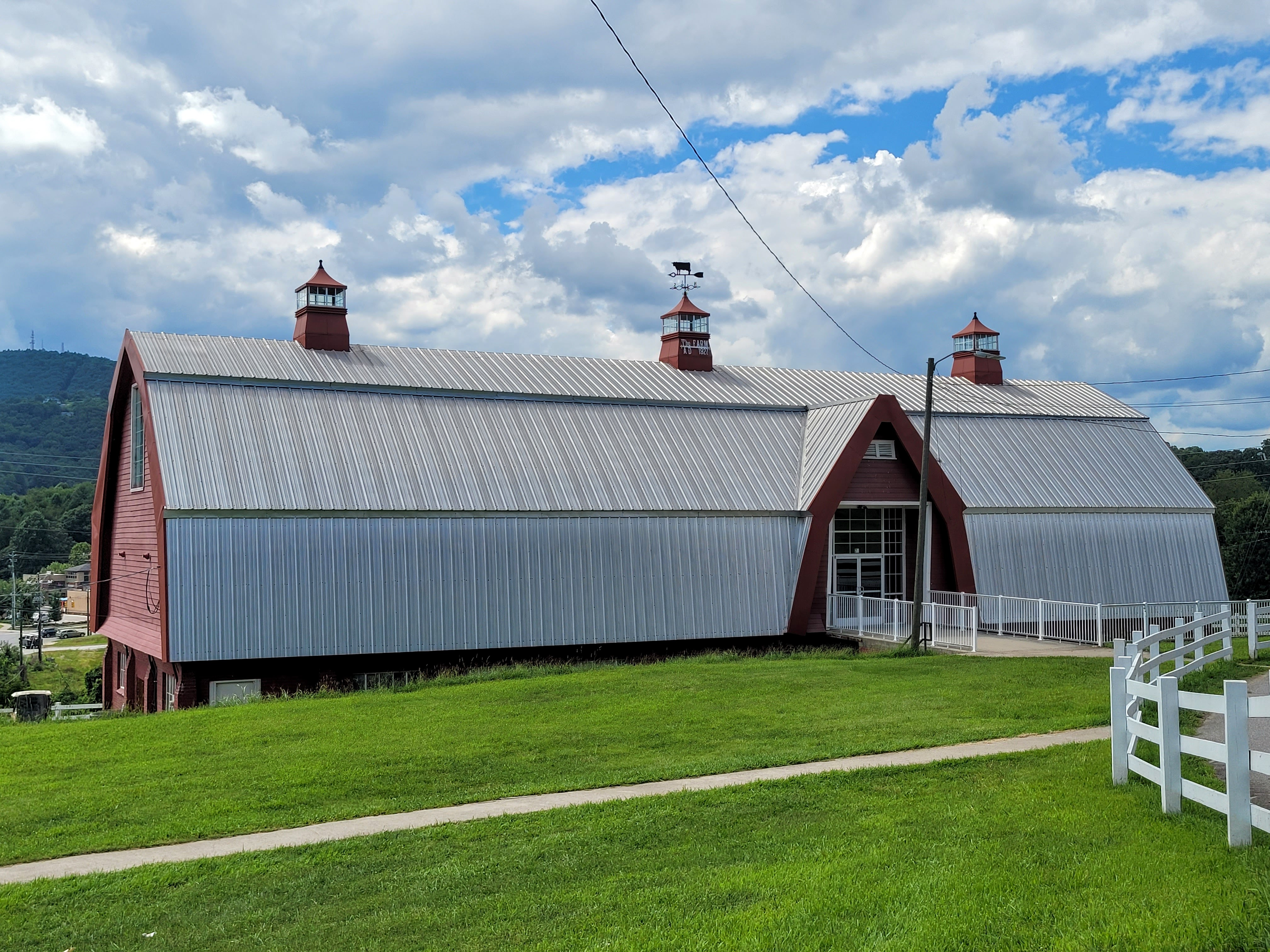
Dairy Barn, 2022

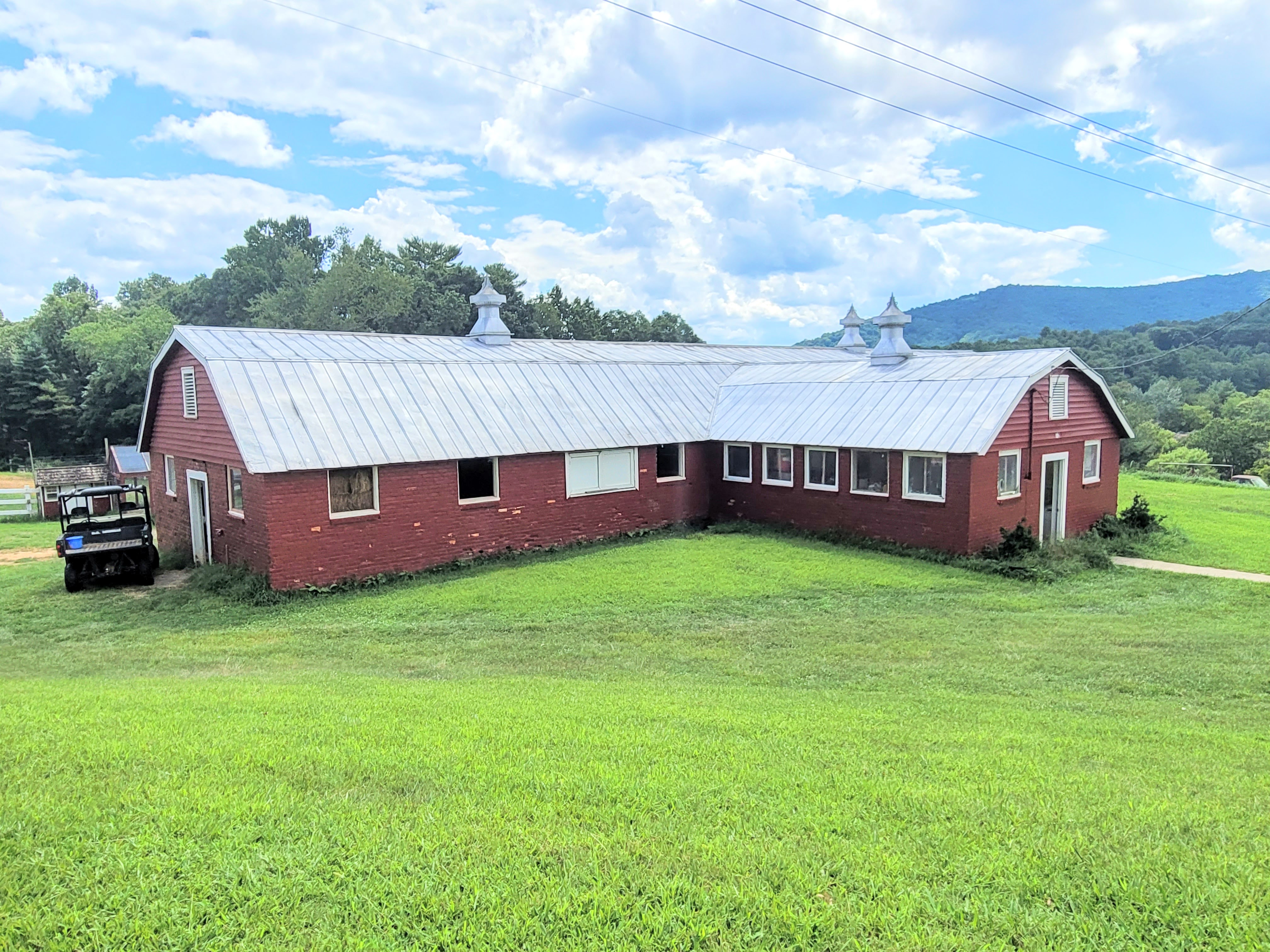
Calf Barn, 2022

== See also ==
- https://www.eliada.org/
