= Riverside Industrial Historic District =

Historic district in North Carolina, United States

- U.S. National Register of Historic Places
- U.S. Historic district
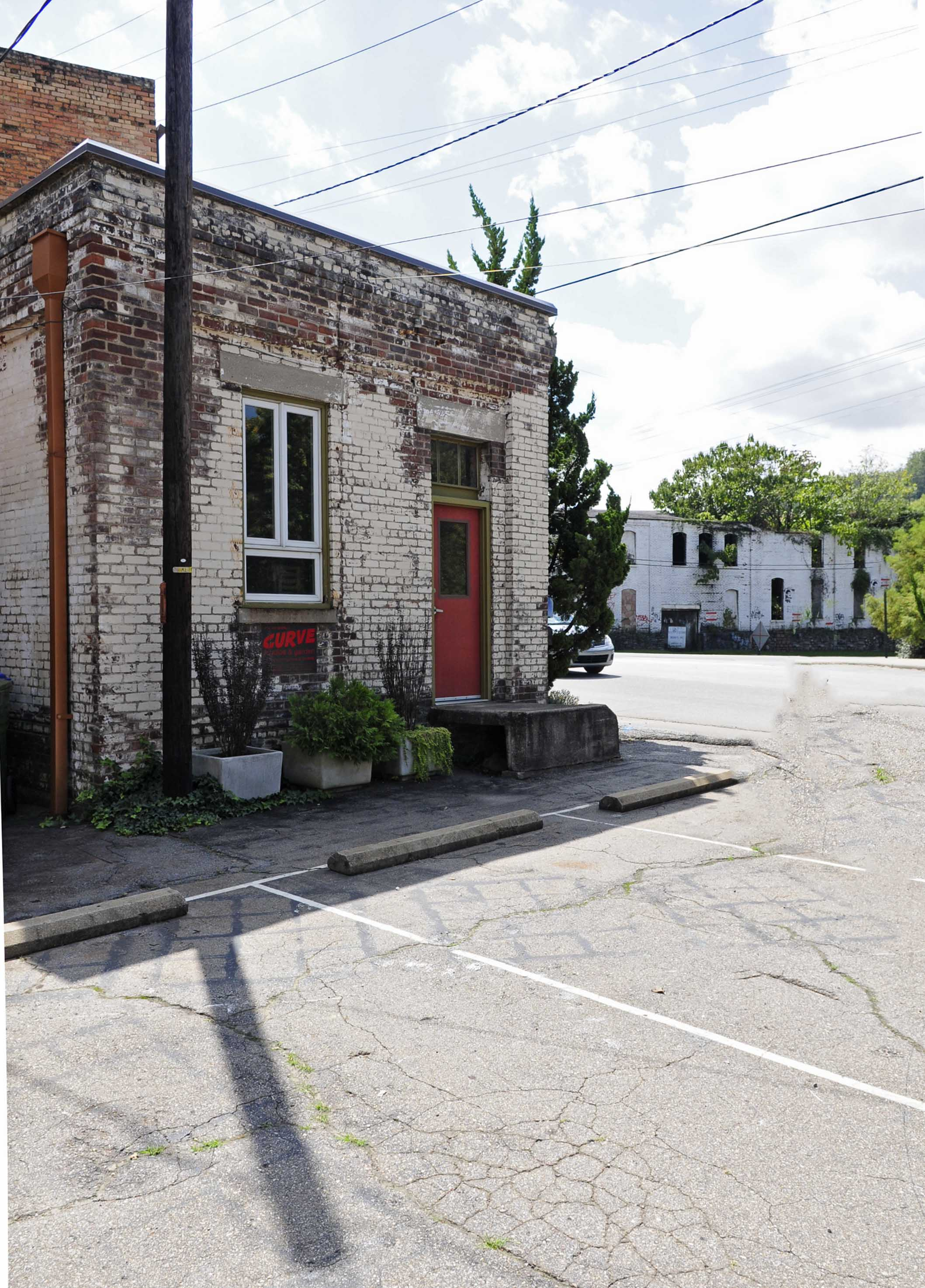
- Riverside Industrial Historic District, September 2012

- Location within North Carolina Location within the United States
- Location: Roughly bounded by Clingman Ave., Lyman St., Roberts St., and Riverside Dr., Asheville, North Carolina
- Coordinates: 35°35′10″N 82°34′01″W
- Area: 39 acres (16 ha)
- Built: 1880
- Architectural style: Italianate, Early Commercial
- NRHP reference No.: 04000825
- Added to NRHP: August 11, 2004

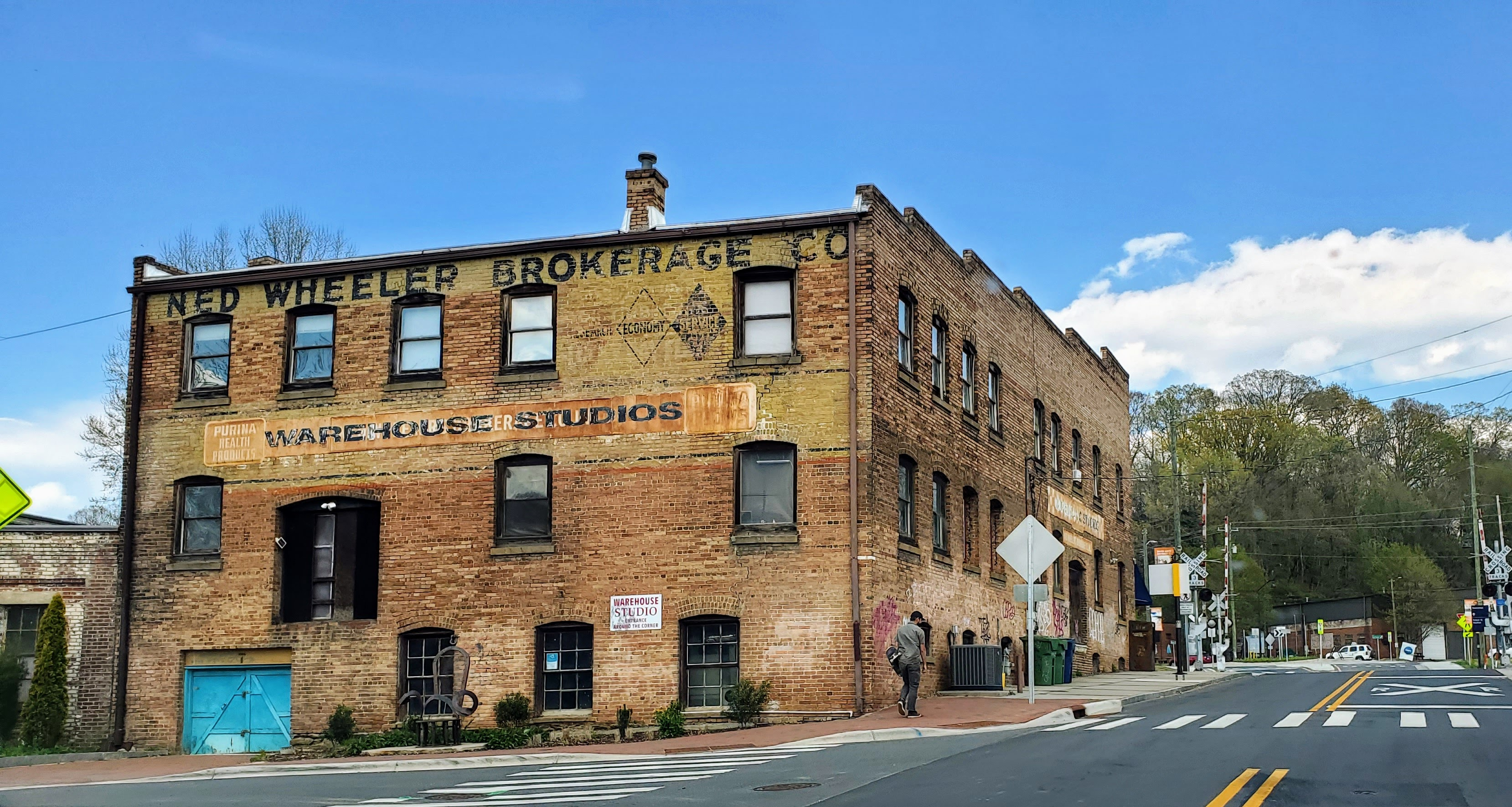
American Feed Milling Company, 2021

Riverside Industrial Historic District, also known as Asheville Wholesale District, is a national historic district located at Asheville, Buncombe County, North Carolina. The district encompasses 27 contributing buildings and one contributing structure (Southern Railway Tracks and Right of Way) in a predominantly industrial section of Asheville. Notable buildings include the Orpheus and Bertha Keener House (c. 1890), American Feed Milling Company (c. 1915), Italianate style Carolina Coal & Ice Company (c. 1905), Asheville Cotton Mill Cloth Warehouse (c. 1900), Standard Oil Company complex (c. 1916), and Farmers Federation Building (c. 1920).

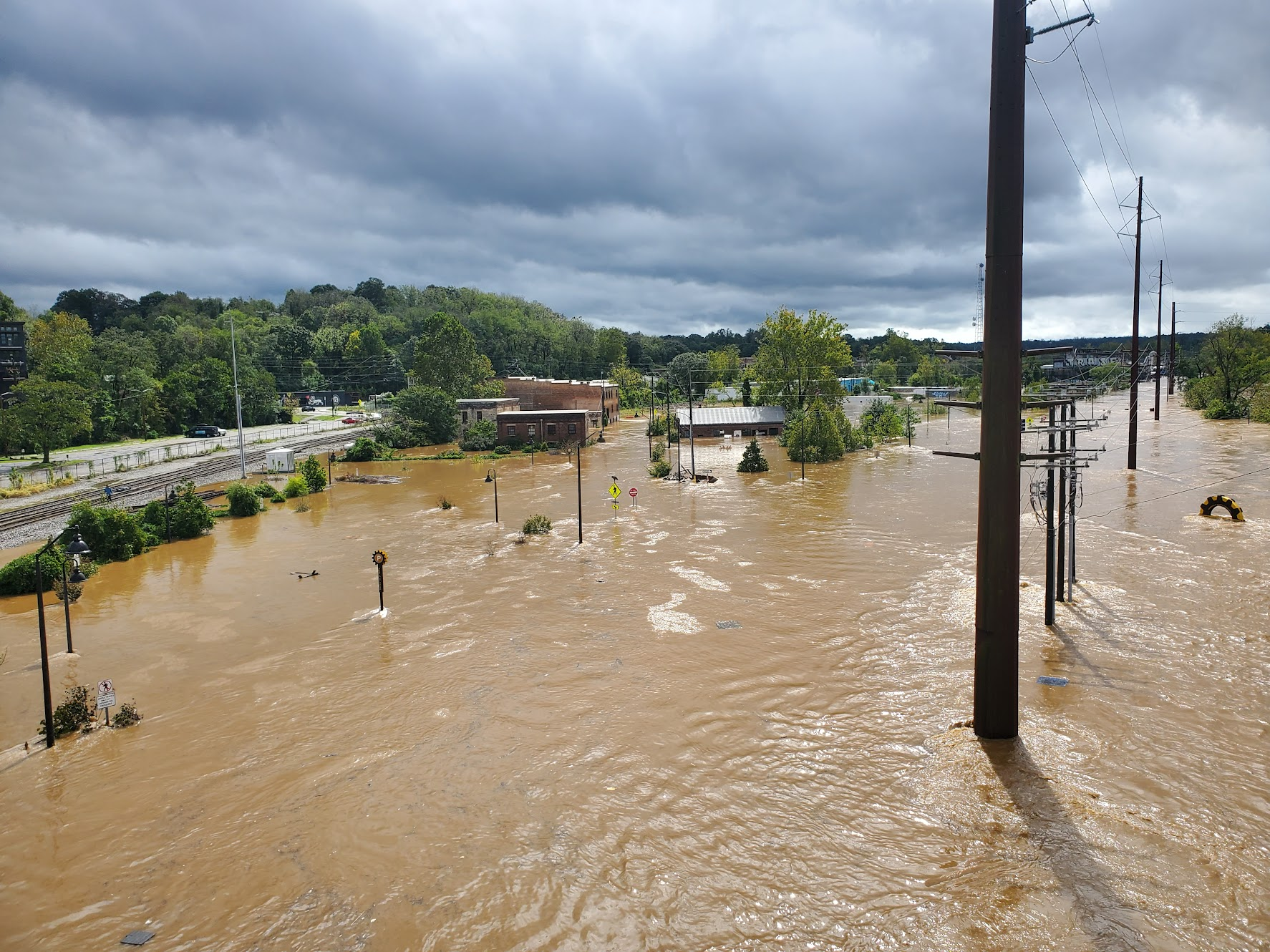
During flooding caused by Hurricane Helene, 2024

It was listed on the National Register of Historic Places in 2004.

In 2024, the area was hit by flooding caused by Hurricane Helene, causing major damage.
