= Whitford G. Smith House =

Historic house in North Carolina, United States

- U.S. National Register of Historic Places
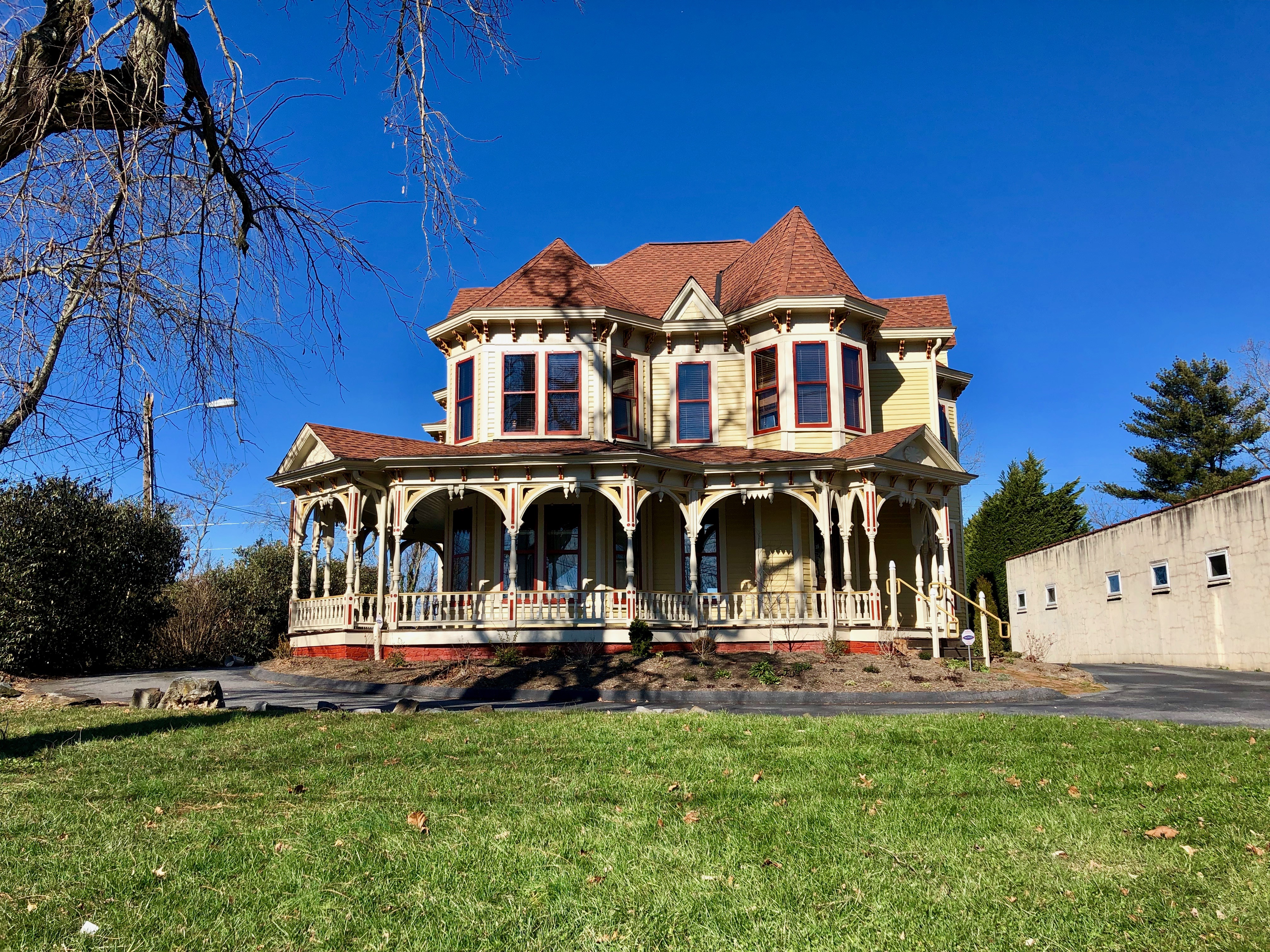
- Whitford G. Smith House, January 2019

- Location within North Carolina Location within the United States
- Location: 263 Haywood St., Asheville, North Carolina
- Coordinates: 35°35′41″N 82°33′43″W
- Area: 0.4 acres (0.16 ha)
- Built: 1894
- Architectural style: Queen Anne
- NRHP reference No.: 05000375
- Added to NRHP: May 4, 2005

Whitford G. Smith House is a historic home located at Asheville, Buncombe County, North Carolina. It was built in 1894, and is a 2 1/2-story, irregular plan, Queen Anne style frame dwelling. It features a wraparound porch and a myriad of projecting pyramidal or gable-roof bays. The house was divided into apartments in the 1980s.

It was listed on the National Register of Historic Places in 2005.
