= Buncombe County Boys' Training School =

Historic school building in North Carolina, United States

- Buncombe County Boys' Training School, (Former)
- U.S. National Register of Historic Places
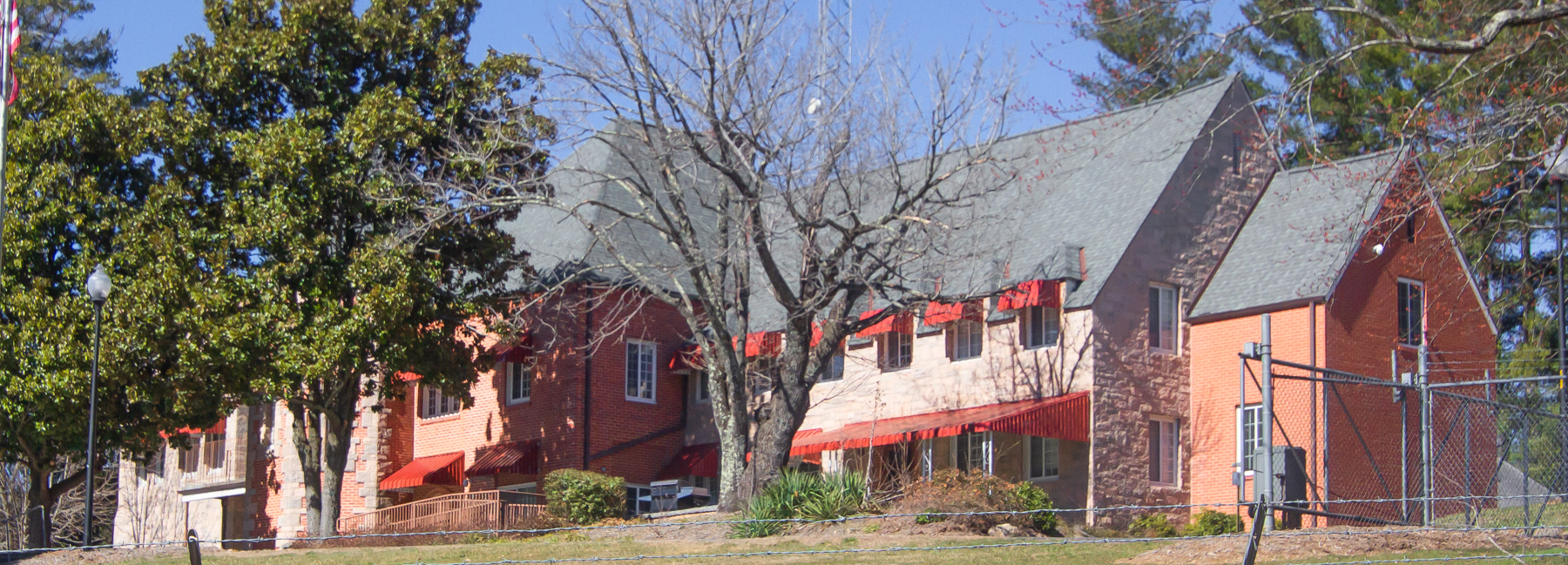

- Location within North Carolina Location within the United States
- Location: 177 Erwin Hills Rd., near Asheville, North Carolina
- Coordinates: 35°37′14″N 82°37′23″W
- Area: 2.8 acres (1.1 ha)
- Built: 1927-1928
- Architect: Greene, Ronald
- Architectural style: Tudor Revival
- NRHP reference No.: 97001197
- Added to NRHP: September 30, 1997

Buncombe County Boys' Training School is a historic school building located near Asheville, Buncombe County, North Carolina. It was built in 1927–1928, and is a two-story, granite and brick main building in the Tudor Revival style. It consists of three principal sections with a two-story, rear ell containing the kitchen and other service areas. The school was permanently closed in 1945, and the building was reopened in 1947 as the new County Home for the Aged. Since 1983, the building has housed an Army National Guard training center. The building was renovated around 2006 and today, houses Buncombe County's Emergency Services and Operations Center It was listed on the National Register of Historic Places in 1997.
