= Richbourg Motors Building =

- U.S. National Register of Historic Places
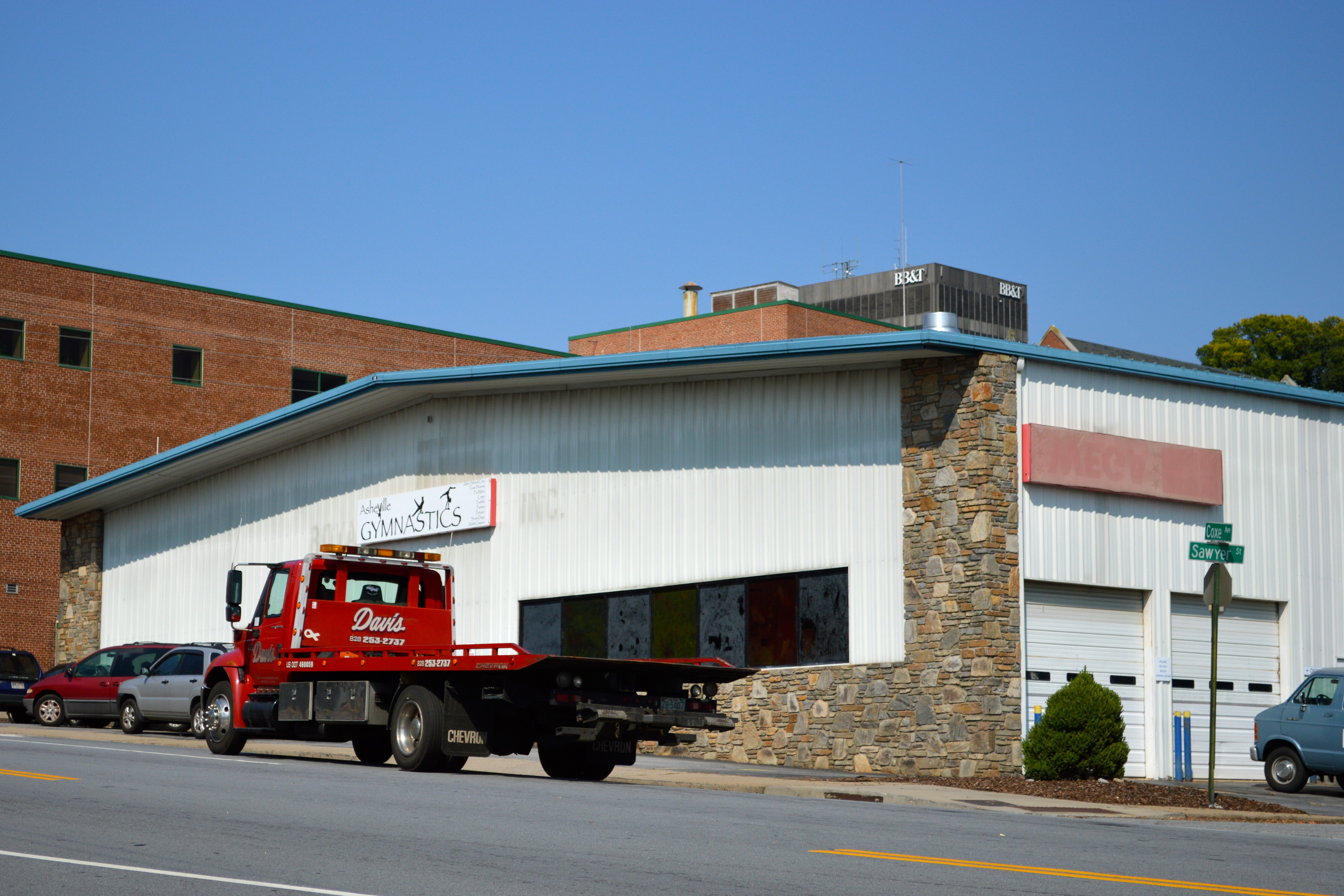
- Site of the Richbourg Motors Building, September 2012

- Location within North Carolina Location within the United States
- Location: 50 Coxe Ave., Asheville, North Carolina
- Coordinates: 35°35′32″N 82°33′17″W
- Area: less than one acre
- Built: 1926
- Architect: Wirth, Albert C.
- MPS: Asheville Historic and Architectural MRA
- NRHP reference No.: 79001681
- Added to NRHP: April 26, 1979

Richbourg Motors Building was a historic auto showroom located at Asheville, Buncombe County, North Carolina. It was built in 1926, and was a three-story slightly curved building faced in brick. It featured a parapet with brick panels and limestone coping. The building was built for Tench C. Coxe and leased to the Richbourg Motor Company, Asheville's Ford and Lincoln dealer. The building has since been demolished.

It was listed on the National Register of Historic Places in 1979.
