= Spinning Wheel (Asheville, North Carolina) =

- U.S. National Register of Historic Places
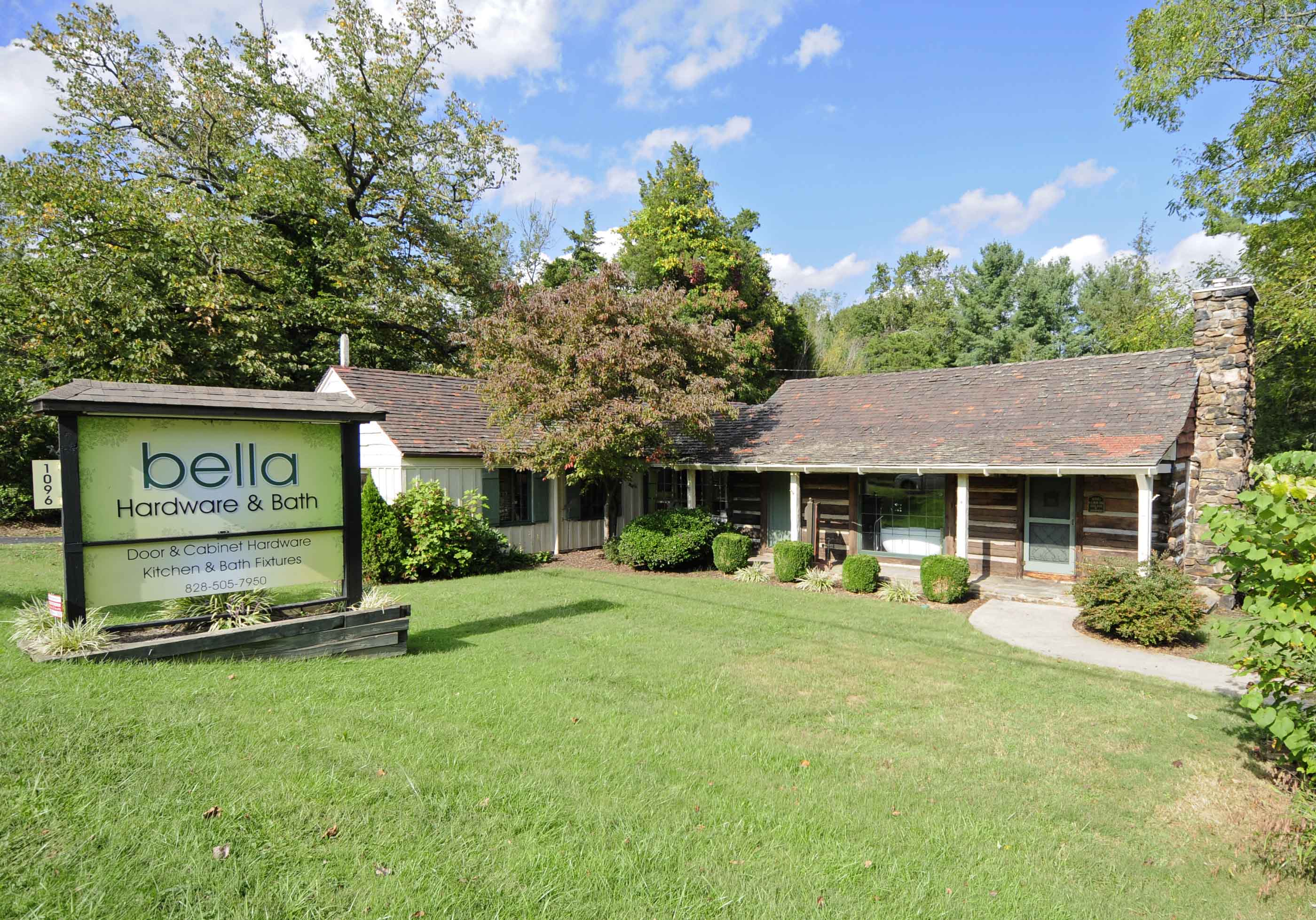
- The Spinning Wheel, September 2012

- Location within North Carolina Location within the United States
- Location: 1096 Hendersonville Rd., Asheville, North Carolina
- Coordinates: 35°32′7″N 82°31′41″W
- Area: less than one acre
- Built: 1939
- Built by: Dodge, William Waldo Jr.
- Architectural style: log building
- NRHP reference No.: 99000913
- Added to NRHP: July 28, 1999

Spinning Wheel is a historic commercial building located at Asheville, Buncombe County, North Carolina. It was built in 1939, and is a one-story, "T" -shaped commercial building with three primary components. It consists of the side-gabled, single-pen log dwelling; a small frame hyphen called the dogtrot; and a frame "loom room". A cement block extension was added in 1945. The building was restored in 1998. The Spinning Wheel operated from 1939 to 1948 and provided education, employment, socialization, and a craft market for the traditional weaving women from the mountains around Asheville.

It was listed on the National Register of Historic Places in 1999.
