= Biltmore =

Biltmore may refer to:

== Related to the Vanderbilt mansion in North Carolina ==
- Biltmore Forest, North Carolina, a town in Buncombe County
- Biltmore Village, a village now within Asheville
- The Biltmore Estate, in Biltmore Forest, near Asheville
  - The Biltmore Company, owner of the above estate
  - Biltmore Farms, dairy farm and real estate company split off from the above estate
  - Biltmore Forest School, on the above estate
  - Biltmore Beacon, a weekly newspaper in Asheville

=== Historic buildings in Biltmore Village ===
- Biltmore Estate Office, a historic office building
- Biltmore Hospital, a historic hospital building
- Biltmore Hardware Building, a historic commercial building
- Biltmore Shoe Store, a historic commercial building
- Biltmore Village Cottage District, a national historic district
- Biltmore Village Cottages, two historic homes formerly located at Biltmore Village
- Biltmore Village Commercial Buildings, a set of two historic commercial buildings

== Places ==
- Biltmore Area, an area of Phoenix, Arizona
  - Biltmore Fashion Park, a luxury outdoor retail and dining plaza in the Biltmore Area, Phoenix
- Biltmore Apartments, a building complex located in Portland, Oregon listed on the National Register of Historic Places
- Biltmore, Tennessee, a census-designated place

== Brands and enterprises ==
- Biltmore Hotel, a name for many of the Bowman-Biltmore Hotels
  - Arizona Biltmore Hotel, in Phoenix, Arizona
  - Millennium Biltmore Hotel, in Los Angeles, California
  - Santa Barbara Biltmore, in Santa Barbara, California
  - Belleview Biltmore, in Belleair, Florida
  - Miami Biltmore, in Coral Gables, Florida
  - Atlanta Biltmore Hotel, in Atlanta, Georgia
  - New York Biltmore Hotel, in New York, New York
  - Westchester Biltmore Country Club, in Harrison, New York
  - Dayton Biltmore Hotel, in Dayton, Ohio
  - Providence Biltmore, Providence, Rhode Island
  - Sevilla Biltmore, in Havana, Cuba
- Biltmore Records, a record label
- Biltmore Theatre, in New York City, now known as the Samuel J. Friedman Theatre

== Other ==
- Biltmore College, a prior name of the University of North Carolina at Asheville
- Biltmore Conference, of Zionist leaders in 1942
- Guelph Biltmores, a junior ice hockey team in Ontario sponsored by the Guelph Biltmore Hat Company
- Biltmore stick, a tool used to measure various tree dimensions
- The Biltmore Agreement, an agreement between radio stations and newspapers
