= Union Station (Columbia, South Carolina) =

- U.S. National Register of Historic Places
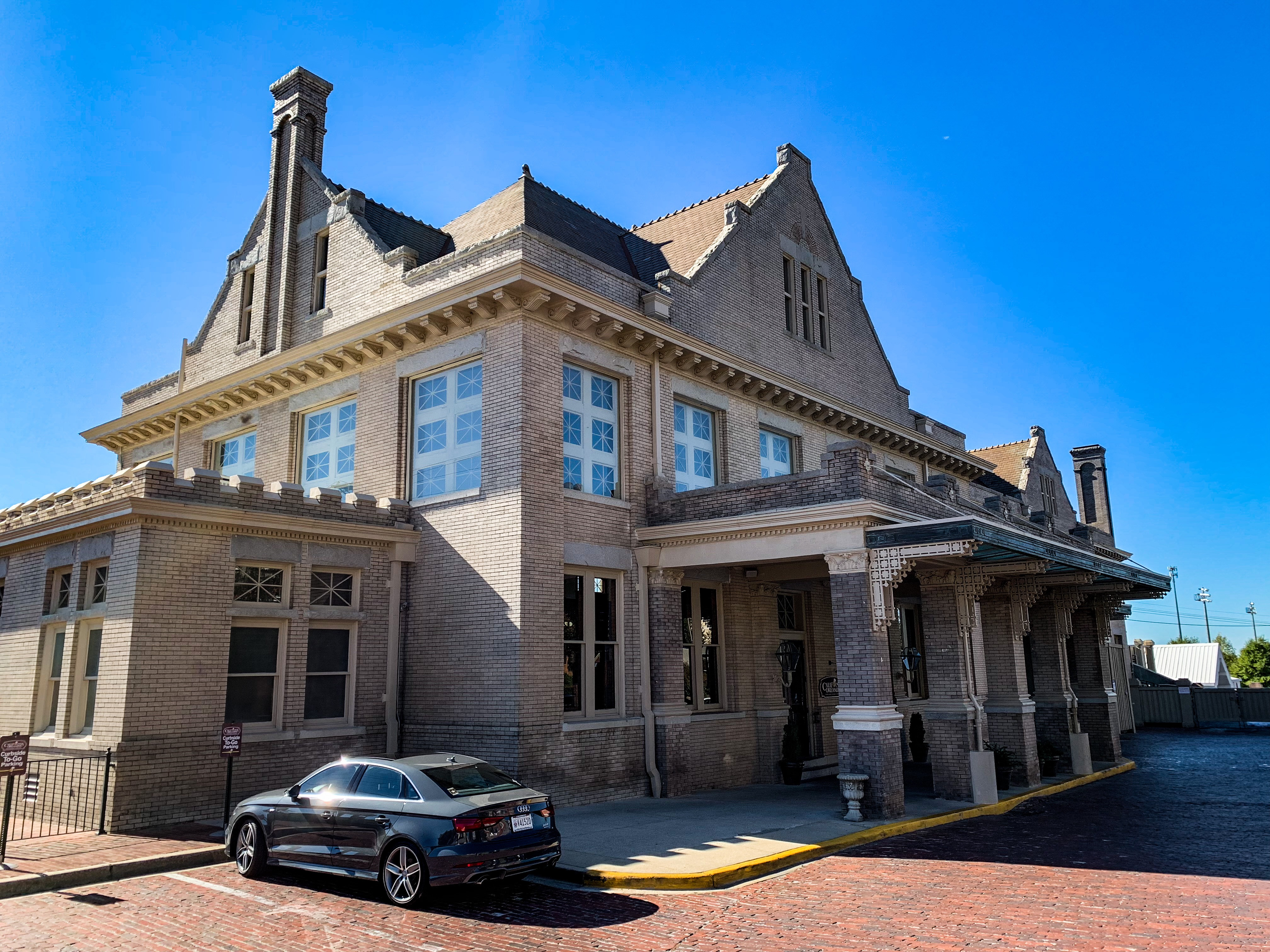

- Location within South Carolina Location within the United States
- Location: 401 S. Main St. Columbia, South Carolina
- Coordinates: 33°59′25″N 81°1′46″W
- Area: 4 acres (1.6 ha)
- Built: 1902
- Architect: Milburn, Frank P.
- Architectural style: Tudor Revival, Jacobethan Revival
- NRHP reference No.: 73001728
- Added to NRHP: June 19, 1973

Union Station (originally Union Depot), also known as Atlantic Coast Line Railroad and Southern Railway Station, is a historic train station located at Columbia, South Carolina. It was built in 1902, and is a brick and stone, eclectic Jacobethan Revival / Tudor Revival building. It features stepped gables and towering chimneys. It was designed by architect Frank Pierce Milburn for the Atlantic Coast Line Railroad and Southern Railway. In contrast to the custom of 'union station' denoting the single station for several railroads, the Seaboard Air Line Railroad had its own station one-half mile away. The formerly Seaboard Silver Star still operates through another station in Columbia.

== Historic recognition ==
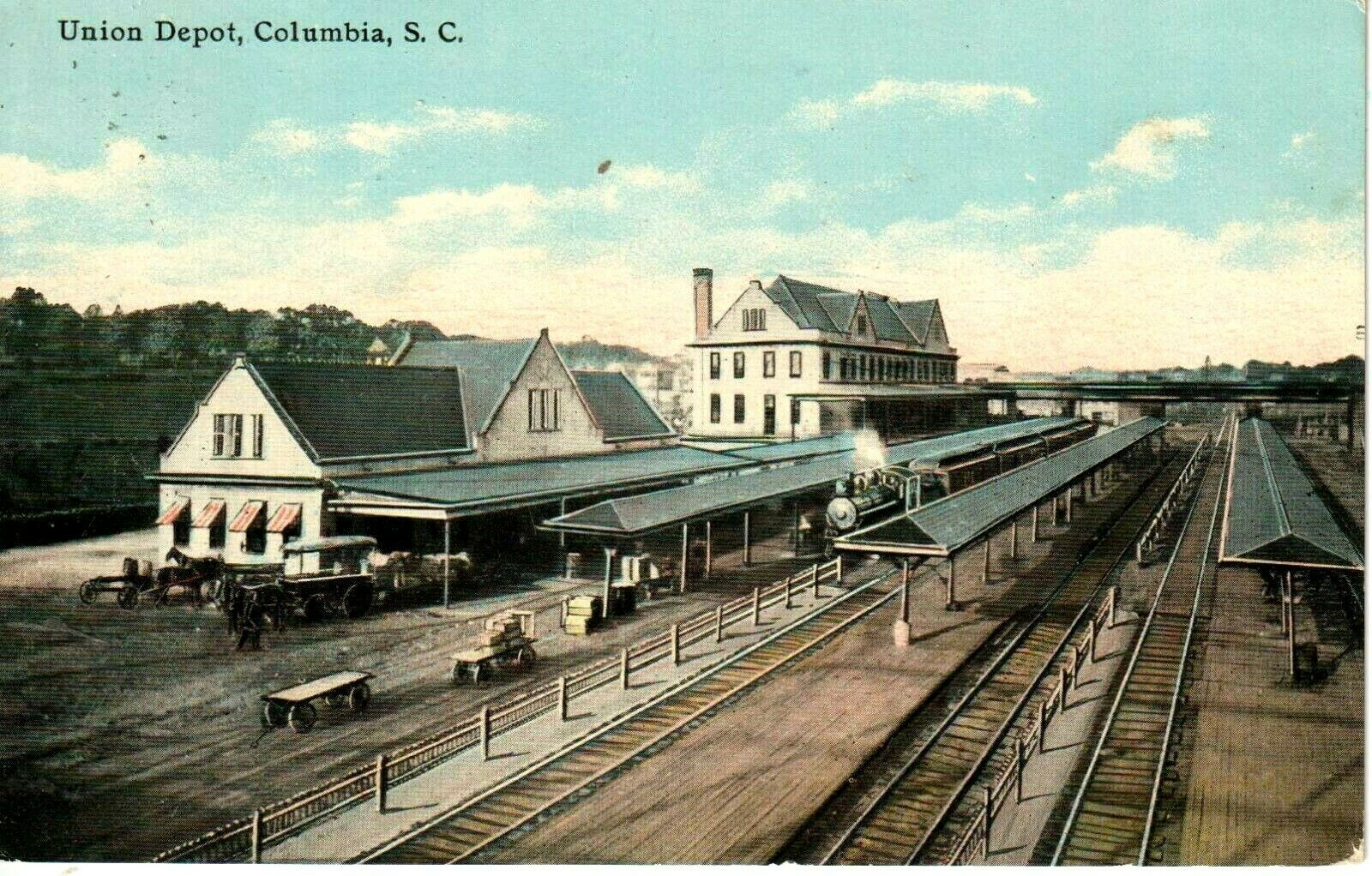
Postcard of Union Depot in Columbia, South Carolina circa 1907–1912.

It was added to the National Register of Historic Places in 1973.

=== Noteworthy trains served at the station ===
Until the 1950s and 1960s the station served several named trains. In contrast to the New York—Florida trajectories of the Amtrak trains today passing through Columbia, the trains offered service in different directions as well.

- Southern Railway:
  - Aiken-Augusta Special: Aiken, South Carolina and Augusta, Georgia -- New York City
  - Carolina Special, the South Carolina branch: Cincinnati -- Charleston, South Carolina
  - Skyland Special: Asheville -- Jacksonville, Florida

The last Southern Railway train serving the station was the Carolina Special in 1968.

- Atlantic Coast Line:
  - Unnamed service east to Florence, South Carolina, with an additional train heading beyond Florence to Wilmington, North Carolina

The last ACL service served the city in 1954.

== Current disposition ==
The building has housed California Dreaming, a high-end bar and grill restaurant, since 1984 and is popular with students and faculty alike.

== See also ==
- Columbia station (South Carolina)

| Preceding station | Atlantic Coast Line Railroad | Following station |
|---|---|---|
| Terminus | Columbia – Wilmington | Sumter toward Wilmington |
| Preceding station | Southern Railway | Following station |
| Killian toward Charlotte | Charlotte – Savannah | Cayce toward Savannah |
| Montgomery toward Greenville | Greenville – Branchville | Childs toward Branchville |
| Alston toward Asheville | Asheville – Columbia | Terminus |
| Cayce toward Augusta | Augusta – Columbia | Terminus |
