= Skyland (disambiguation) =

Skyland is an animated television series.

Skyland may also refer to:

- Skyland İstanbul, an office and residential complex in Sarıyer, Istanbul, Turkey

== United States ==
- Skyland, Nevada, a census-designated place
- Skyland, North Carolina, an unincorporated community
- Skyland (Washington, D.C.), a neighborhood in Southeast Washington, D.C.
- Skyland Conference, a New Jersey high school sports association
- Skyland Resort, a small privately owned resort on Skyline Drive in the Shenandoah National Park

== See also ==
- Skylands (disambiguation)
- Skylanders, a video game series
- Skyland Special, defunct train in the United States
