= Smoak Tramway =

The Smoak Tramway was a tram way built in Branchville, South Carolina by W.E.T.R. Smoak of Branchville, SC. The Smoak Tramway was a three-foot narrow gauge line using wooden rails. Approximately 6 miles long, it started operating in 1884 and ended service in 1890. The tram way was chartered by an act of the South Carolina Legislature on December 23, 1884 (although another author cites the date as December 24, 1884). Used as a logging railroad for Smoak Mill (built and formerly operated by John Rowe), Smoak supplied finished wood and cross-ties to the Southern Railroad. The Smoak Tramway used narrow gauge flat cars donated by the Charlotte, Columbia and Augusta Railroad. A descendant of the Smoak family wrote a short history of the line that indicated the line had a locomotive and five logging cars. The locomotive was a Tanner & Delaney seven-ton locomotive designed to run on wooden rails. The Smoak Tramway is considered a precursor line to the Branchville and Bowman Railroad.
