= Carolina Special =

Former American passenger rail service

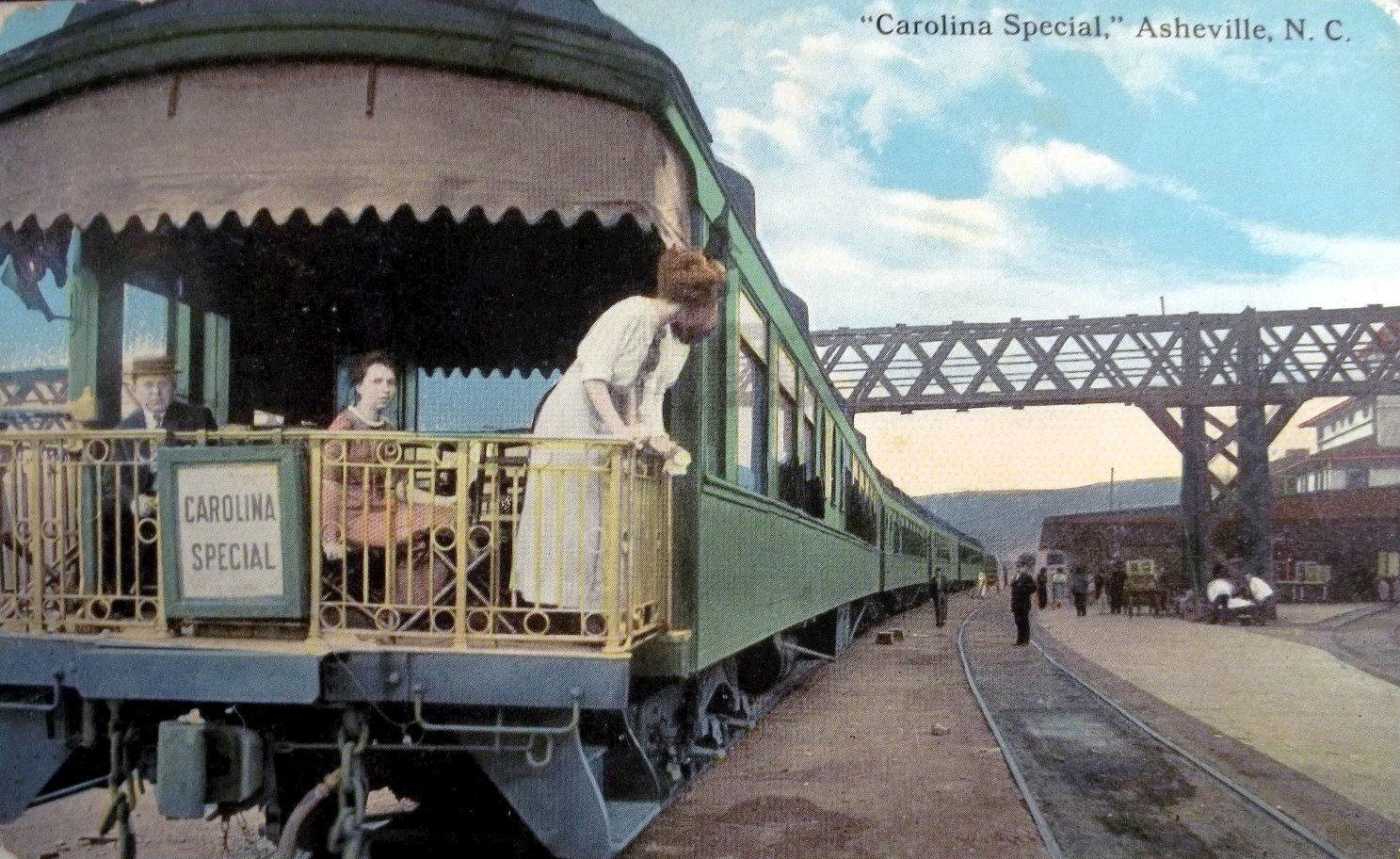
- Colorized postcard view of an open-deck observation car with drumhead at the end of a Carolina Special consist at Asheville, North Carolina, the female passengers' garb dating it prior to World War I, in the train's first decade of operation.

Overview
- Service type: Inter-city rail
- Status: Discontinued
- Locale: Southeastern United States
- First service: January 22, 1911
- Last service: December 5, 1968
- Former operator: Southern Railway

Route
- Termini: Cincinnati, Ohio; The Carolinas (Goldsboro, North Carolina and Charleston, South Carolina)
- Distance travelled: 731.2 miles (1,176.8 km) (Cincinnati-Charleston, 1952); 636.5 miles (1,024.3 km) (Cincinnati-Goldsboro, 1952)
- Service frequency: Daily
- Train number: Northwest: 27, Southeast: 28

On-board services
- Seating arrangements: Reclining Seat Coaches
- Sleeping arrangements: Open sections, compartments and drawing rooms
- Catering facilities: Restaurant-lounge
- Baggage facilities: Baggage car

Technical
- Track gauge: 4 ft 8 1/2 in (1,435 mm)

The Carolina Special was a passenger train operated by the Southern Railway between Cincinnati, Ohio, and the Carolinas. It operated from 1911 to 1968. It was the last passenger train to use the route of the Charleston and Hamburg Railroad, which, as the South Carolina Canal and Railroad Company, began operation in December 1830, as one of the oldest railroads in the United States, and, by 1833, operated a 136-mile (219 km) line to Hamburg, South Carolina, on the Savannah River, the country's longest at that time. All Southern Railway Pullman service to Charleston rode over that historic, if bucolic, route from Branchville to the port city.

== History ==
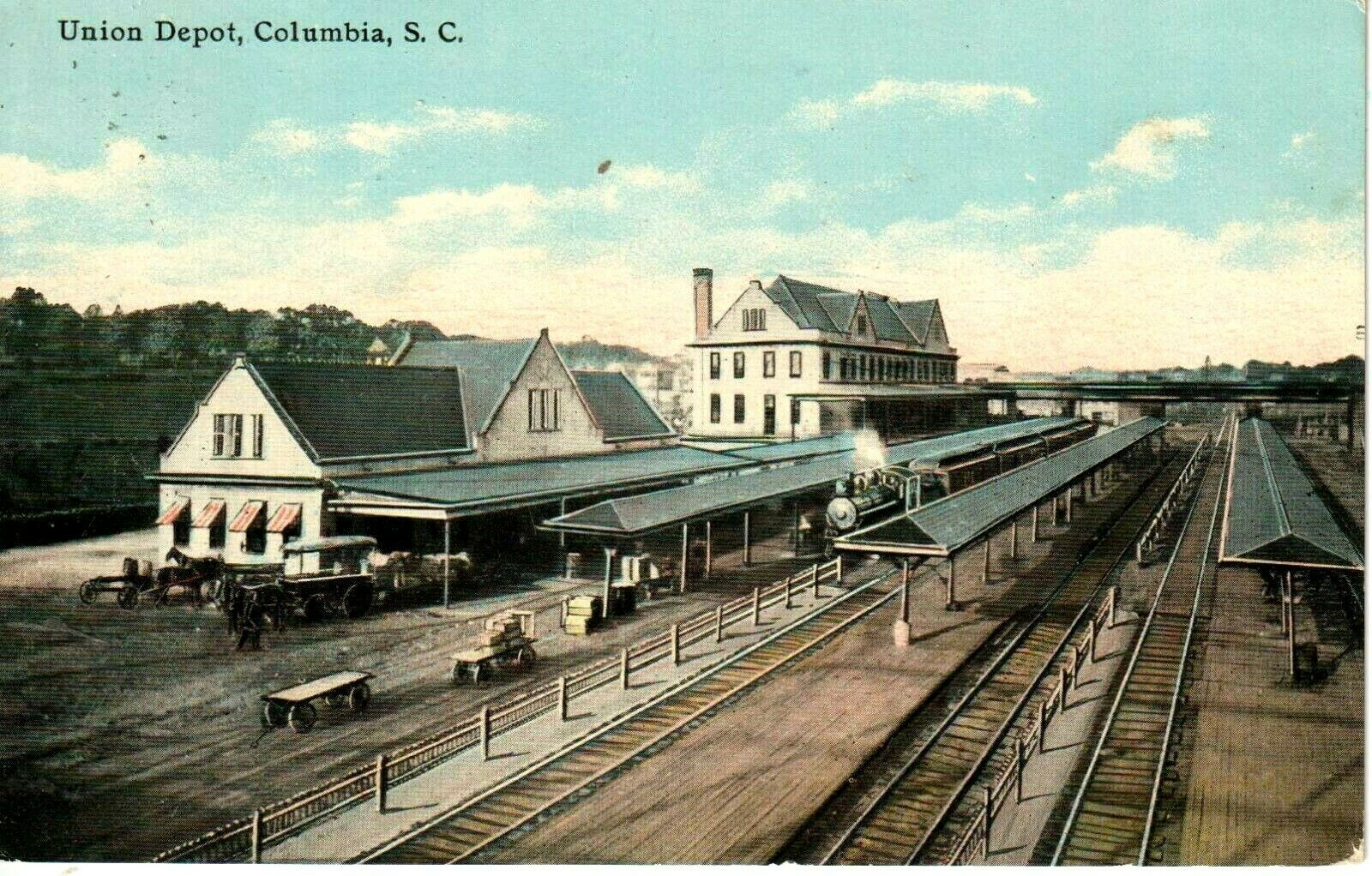
Postcard of Union Depot in Columbia, South Carolina c. 1907–1912; where the train's South Carolina branch had its southern terminus from 1964 to 1968.

The Southern Railway introduced the Carolina Special on January 22, 1911, between Cincinnati and Charleston, South Carolina, via Asheville, North Carolina. The trip took 25 hours. The train's equipment included coaches, Pullman sleeping cars, an observation car and a dining car. Through-sleepers were later added to and from three different origins, Chicago, Detroit and Cleveland via the New York Central (NYC). NYC coaches linked at Cincinnati from Detroit and Cleveland. In mid-20th century the train was augmented to have an eastern North Carolina branch splitting off at Biltmore, North Carolina and heading east to Winston-Salem, Greensboro, Durham, Raleigh and Goldsboro. The Greensboro to Raleigh part of this branch is continued today in Amtrak's North Carolina–based Piedmont service.

"Despite its singular name, the train served both Carolinas, with a northern section going to Greensboro and Goldsboro, N.C., and the southern section serving Spartanburg, Columbia, and Charleston. The train was divided at Asheville. Over the years the consists varied (sleepers from Cincinnati to Columbia and Charleston were listed in 1917, Chicago-Columbia in 1925, Cincinnati-Spartanburg in 1930, and so forth), but typically they included a Chicago-Charleston car. Before the train was inaugurated, the Southern had run a Charleston-Cincinnati sleeper by way of Augusta and Atlanta (Georgia Railroad), but for the 57 years of its life, the Carolina Special offered a unique connection to the Cincinnati gateway."

In pre-World War II years the train had additional sections that were northern destinations, aside from the default site of Cincinnati. A branch from Louisville joined with the train in Danville, and a Nashville branch running over the Tennessee Central's tracks joined the main route at Harriman. Continuing sleeper equipment was offered between Louisville and Asheville and between Nashville and Knoxville. This was a rare instance of a long-distance train traveling east out of Nashville. By the 1950s, the Louisville part persisted as a connection, but not a through-train. However, the Nashville section, running over the Tennessee Central's tracks, was entirely lost. The connecting TC train at Harriman was impractical as a connection, out of sync with the Carolina Special by several hours.

By 1954 the train's North Carolina route east from Asheville ended at Greensboro. By 1954 the South Carolina branch no longer went to Charleston; rather, it ended at Columbia. By 1966 the train lost its dining car, which in the early 1960s had been downgraded to a dinette. The Southern Railway discontinued the Carolina Special on December 5, 1968, which had by then dwindled to a coach-only remnant. In final years, all that remained was a remnant of the "Asheville Special" was a three day a week train, Southern Railway #3/#4, between Asheville and Salisbury. The discontinuing of this unnamed remnant on August 8, 1975 was the last regularly scheduled passenger service for Asheville. Most of the line between Charleston and Aiken, South Carolina, has been lifted as there was little freight traffic generated by the historic but redundant route to justify its continued operation.

== Main stops on route ==
- Cincinnati (Union Station)
- Knoxville (Southern Terminal)
- Asheville

Northern section:

- Winston-Salem
- Greensboro
- Durham
- Raleigh (Union Station)
- Goldsboro (Union Station)

Southern section:

- Spartanburg
- Columbia (Union Station)
- Charleston
