= Sixty Six, South Carolina =

- Unincorporated community
- Location within South Carolina Location within the United States
- Coordinates: 33°18′21″N 80°49′34″W
- Country: United States
- State: South Carolina
- County: Orangeburg
- Elevation: 141 ft (43 m)
- Time zone: UTC-5 (Eastern (EST))
  - Summer (DST): UTC-4 (EDT)
- Area codes: 803, 839
- GNIS feature ID: 1250918

Sixty Six is an unincorporated community in Orangeburg County, South Carolina, United States. Sixty Six is located along U.S. Route 21, north of Branchville.
