= The Press-Radio War =

The Press-Radio War in the United States lasted from 1933 to 1935. Newspaper publishers were concerned to maintain their own dominance of the news market in the face of the emerging radio networks. The Press induced the wire services to stop providing news bulletins to radio broadcasters, which then developed their own news-gathering facilities. In response the press launched political, economic and legal campaigns to prevent news being broadcast on radio, culminating in The Biltmore Agreement by which major networks were compelled to heavily restrict radio news coverage. However, broadcasters soon developed ways to subvert the terms of this agreement, including the use of newly established news agencies such as the Transradio Press Service.

== Background ==
News was destined to become one of radio's strongest services in the early 1930s, but it still had its struggles. At first, radio announcers would just read newspaper headlines over the air, but gradually networks began purchasing news from wire services. In 1932 the Associated Press sold presidential election bulletins to the networks, and programs were interrupted with news flashes. Newspapers objected to this on the grounds that news on radio would diminish the sale of papers.

== The three stages of the Press-Radio War ==
=== Start of conflict ===
Stage one began very slowly, and the newspapers were not at all hostile toward broadcasting. In fact, they were helpful in promoting radio in the early 1920s. Initially, the stations were not seen as channels of news delivery, but as promotional devices for the newspapers that owned them. The prospect of wire service provision of news to radio upset some print journalists, and that led to the Associated Press issuing a notice to its members that AP news bulletins were not to be used for purposes of broadcasting. One event that led to conflict between the journalists was the 1924 Presidential Election.

=== Wire services ===
Stage two, the entry of radio as a new medium was horrifying to the established news distribution source. Prior to radio news moved through wire services, through the newspapers to the people. The press started to fear that if radio started to provide news, then news could bypass the newspapers, thus shifting the flow of news throughout society. This started a fight for self-preservation on the part of newspapers, which could only be won if all journalists stood together. In April 1933 all three wire services agreed to stop providing radio with news bulletins. The anti-radio forces had finally gotten their wish. Broadcasters were now forced to find new ways of obtaining bulletins for their newscasts, and by the fall of 1933 CBS established a full news division, NBC followed on a smaller scale and the networks were more independent from print journalists for their news bulletins.

=== The Biltmore Agreement and its failure ===
Stage three, print journalists had to find ways to prevent and limit the development of broadcasting. The "attack" on broadcasting took three forms, political lobbying, economic boycott, and legal action. At first it worked, only a few months after networks began broadcasting their own news, they appealed to the press to meet and negotiate a "peace agreement".

A meeting of newspaper publishers, network executives, and wire service representatives, held at the Biltmore Hotel in New York City on December 11–12, 1933, established the Biltmore Agreement. Under the agreement, a Press-Radio Bureau was set up to supply the networks with news bulletins; it began operating on March 1, 1934. The meeting was called by CBS President William S. Paley with the purpose to end the long standing dispute as to news broadcasting. It stipulated that networks could air two five-minute newscasts a day, one in the morning after 9:30 A.M. and one in the evening after 9:00 p.m. so they would not compete with the primary hours of newspaper sales. No "hot off the wire" news was to be broadcast, and newscasts were not to have advertising support because this might detract from newspaper advertising. Newspaper publishers ensured that these provisions appeared in the Biltmore Agreement because they were the more powerful and wealthiest of the meeting participants.

The deal had barely been a few hours old when its intent began to be subverted. The newspaper publishers agreed to allow radio stations and networks to have commentators. Radio took advantage of this provision, and often these commentators became thinly disguised news reporters. NBC and CBS began their own news gathering activities. At NBC, one person gathered news simply by making telephone calls. Sometimes he scooped newspaper reporters because almost anyone would answer a call at NBC. In addition, he could reward news sources with highly prized tickets to NBC's top shows.

Independent broadcasters did not sign the agreement, leaving a big problem for the press, because only 150 of the 600 radio stations were network owned. Before long, news gathering agencies emerged to fill the vacancy of news sources. The most successful of these agencies was the Transradio Press Service, which had over 150 subscribers after only 9 months of operation. There was nothing the press could do and no legal justification for taking action against the agencies.

== Conclusion ==
Broadcast journalism did not develop until the mid 1930s. Relationships between the older print media and the newer medium of radio were not friendly, and the journalists of the time needed considerable diplomatic skills in dealing with the wire services and their own employers. Disputes between the two media again came to a head in 1938, when newspapers deliberately exaggerated the impact of the CBS radio drama adaptation of The War of the Worlds to make it appear that the little-heard program had caused a mass panic among listeners that thought CBS was reporting an actual foreign invasion, a myth that its lead actor Orson Welles later embraced.

By the beginning of the next decade the effectiveness and reliability of broadcast journalism was confirmed by the coverage of World War II.
