= Vanderbilt =

Vanderbilt may refer to:

== People ==
- Vanderbilt (surname)
- Vanderbilt family

== Places in the United States ==
- Vanderbilt, California, a former gold-mining town
- Vanderbilt, Michigan, a village
- Vanderbilt, Nevada, a ghost town
- Vanderbilt Mansion National Historic Site, Hyde Park, NY
- Vanderbilt, Pennsylvania, a borough
- Vanderbilt, Texas, a census-designated place

== Other uses ==
- Vanderbilt Avenue, three New York City streets
- Vanderbilt Club, a bidding system in the game of contract bridge, devised by Harold S. Vanderbilt
- Vanderbilt Cup, in American auto racing
- Vanderbilt Mortgage and Finance, specializes in mortgages for manufactured homes
- Vanderbilt Museum, in Centerport, New York, built with a bequest from William Kissam Vanderbilt II
- Vanderbilt Prep, a fictitious private school in Degrassi
- Vanderbilt Tender, a type of steam locomotive tender with a round water tank
- Vanderbilt Trophy, a contract bridge tournament
- Vanderbilt University, a private research university in Nashville, Tennessee, USA
  - Vanderbilt Commodores, the athletics program of Vanderbilt University
- USCS Vanderbilt, a survey ship in service with the United States Coast Survey from 1842 to 1855
- USS Vanderbilt, a passenger steamship converted to a cruiser during the American Civil War

== See also ==
- Biltmore (disambiguation)
- Condado Vanderbilt Hotel in Puerto Rico
- George Vanderbilt Sumatran Expedition
- "Mrs Vandebilt", a song from the Paul McCartney and Wings album Band on the Run
- One Vanderbilt, a skyscraper in New York City
