= Biltmore Estate Office =

Historic office building in North Carolina, US

- U.S. National Register of Historic Places
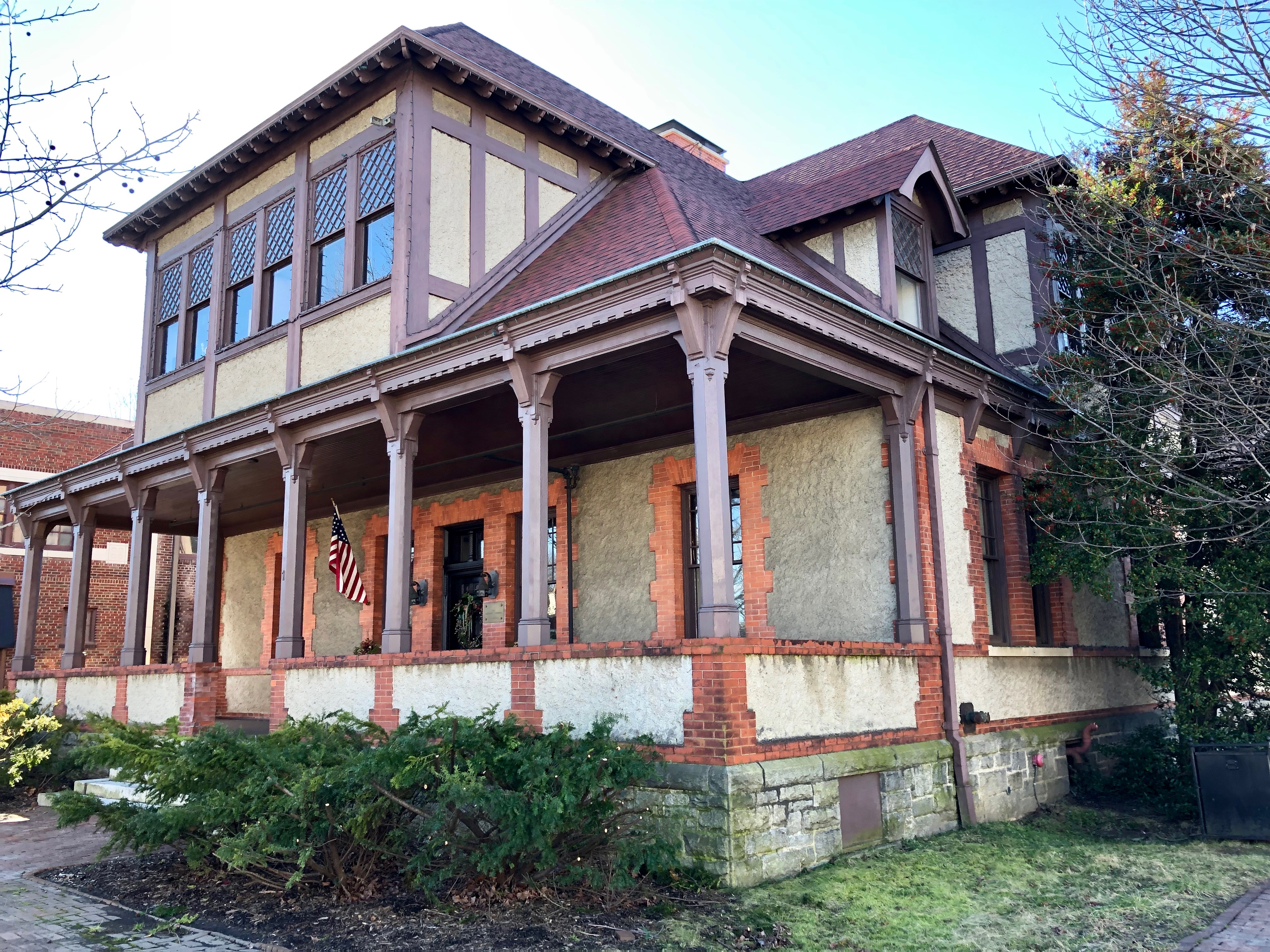
- Biltmore Estate Office, January 2019

- Location within North Carolina Location within the United States
- Location: 10 Biltmore Plaza, Asheville, North Carolina
- Coordinates: 35°34′3″N 82°32′34″W
- Area: less than one acre
- Built: 1896
- Architect: Hunt, Richard Morris
- MPS: Biltmore Village MRA
- NRHP reference No.: 79001668
- Added to NRHP: November 15, 1979

Biltmore Estate Office is a historic office building located at Biltmore Village, Asheville, Buncombe County, North Carolina. It was designed by architect Richard Morris Hunt and built in 1896. It is a 1 1/2-story pebbledash finished building with a hipped roof, half-timbering, brick trim, and chamfered and bracketed porch posts.

It was listed on the National Register of Historic Places in 1979.
