= Asheville station =

- Southern Railway Passenger Depot
- U.S. National Register of Historic Places
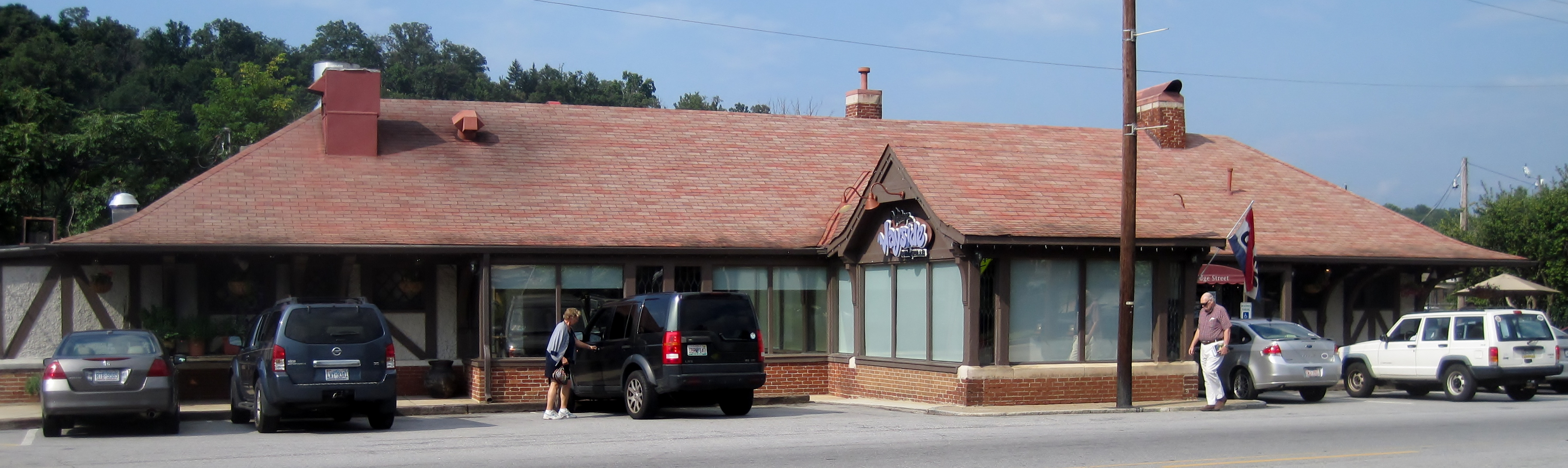
- Southern Railway Passenger Depot, August 2012

- Location within North Carolina Location within the United States
- Location: 1 Biltmore Plaza, Asheville, North Carolina
- Coordinates: 35°34′3″N 82°32′34″W
- Area: less than one acre
- Built: 1896
- Architect: Hunt, Richard Morris
- MPS: Biltmore Village MRA
- NRHP reference No.: 79001684
- Added to NRHP: November 15, 1979

Southern Railway Passenger Depot is a historic train station located at Biltmore Village, Asheville, North Carolina. It was designed by architect Richard Morris Hunt and built in 1896 for the Southern Railway. It is a one-story symmetrical structure with a low hipped roof, central porte cochere, wide overhanging eaves, half-timbering, and a pebbledash finish.

The station replaced a smaller building that preceded Cornelius Vanderbilt's purchase of land to comprise the Biltmore Estate.

The Southern Railway Depot on Depot St. in Asheville was closed in 1968 due to costs and was demolished in early 1969. After this the Biltmore station served as Asheville's station until passenger train service was discontinued in early August 1975. The station now houses a restaurant. If passenger service to Asheville is restored, a new station will be built.

The Southern Railway (SOU) Operated the Skyland Special from Asheville, NC To Jacksonville, FL With major stops in Spartanburg, SC; Columbia, SC; and Savanah, GA. The Southern Railway also had the Asheville Special from New York City to Asheville with Major stops in Philadelphia, PA; Baltimore, MD; Washington, DC; Greensboro, NC; and Winston-Salem, NC.

The station was listed on the National Register of Historic Places in 1979.

Preceding station	Southern Railway	Following station
Asheville toward Morristown	Morristown – Norwood	Azalea toward Norwood
Asheville Terminus	Asheville – Columbia	Buena Vista toward Columbia
