= Biltmore Hardware Building =

Historic building in North Carolina, US

- U.S. National Register of Historic Places
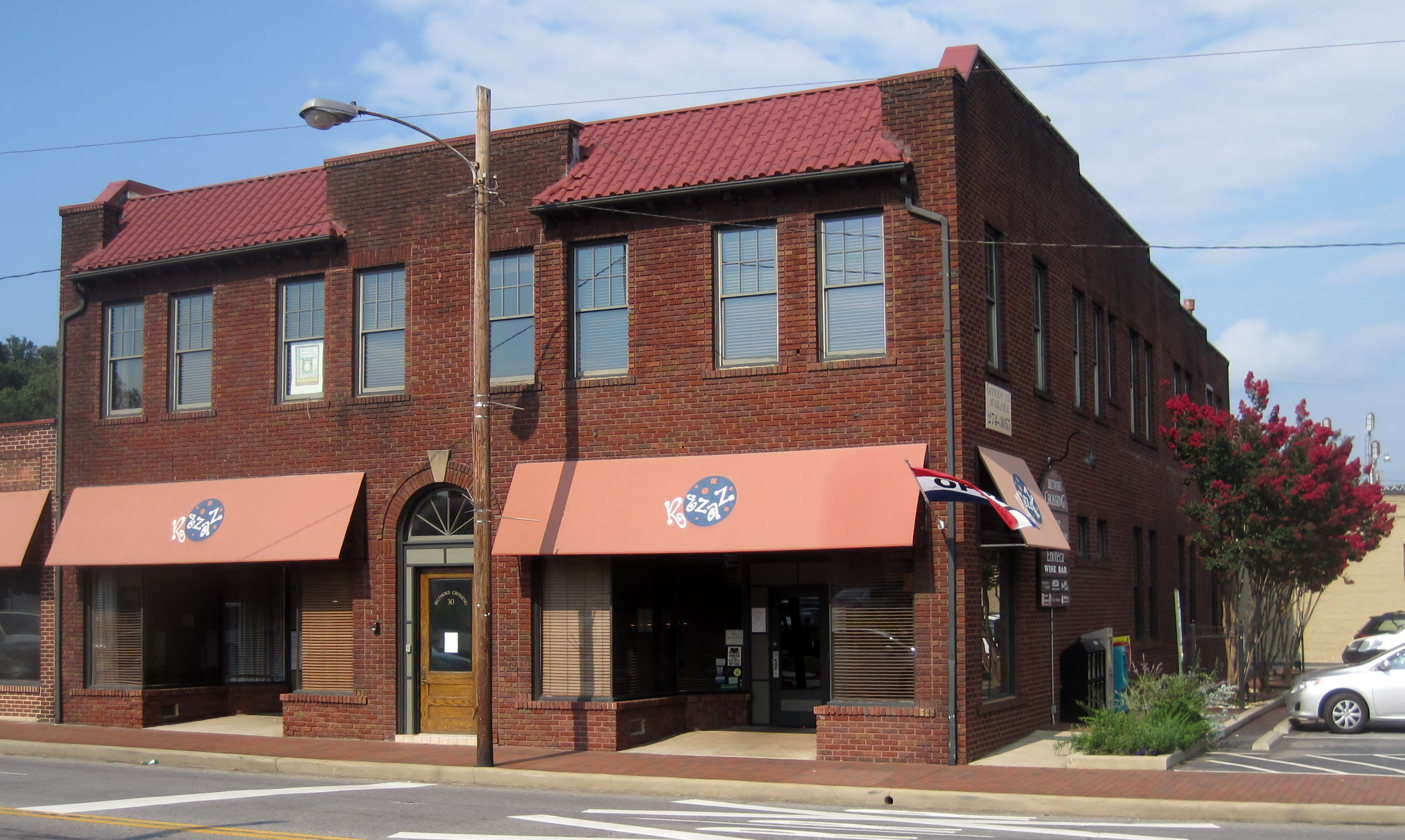
- Biltmore Hardware Building, August 2012

- Location within North Carolina Location within the United States
- Location: 28-32 Hendersonville Rd., Asheville, North Carolina
- Coordinates: 35°34′3″N 82°32′38″W
- Area: less than one acre
- Built: 1923, 1927
- Architectural style: Early Commercial
- MPS: Biltmore Village MRA
- NRHP reference No.: 03000800
- Added to NRHP: August 21, 2003

Biltmore Hardware Building is a historic commercial building located at Biltmore Village, Asheville, Buncombe County, North Carolina. It was built in 1923, and is a two-story, rectangular brick structure, with a one-story wing added in 1927. It has a central doorway flanked by storefronts. It was the home of Biltmore Hardware, a business that existed in Biltmore Village from about 1936 to 2000.

It was listed on the National Register of Historic Places in 2003.
