= Biltmore Hospital =

Historic hospital in North Carolina, US

- U.S. National Register of Historic Places
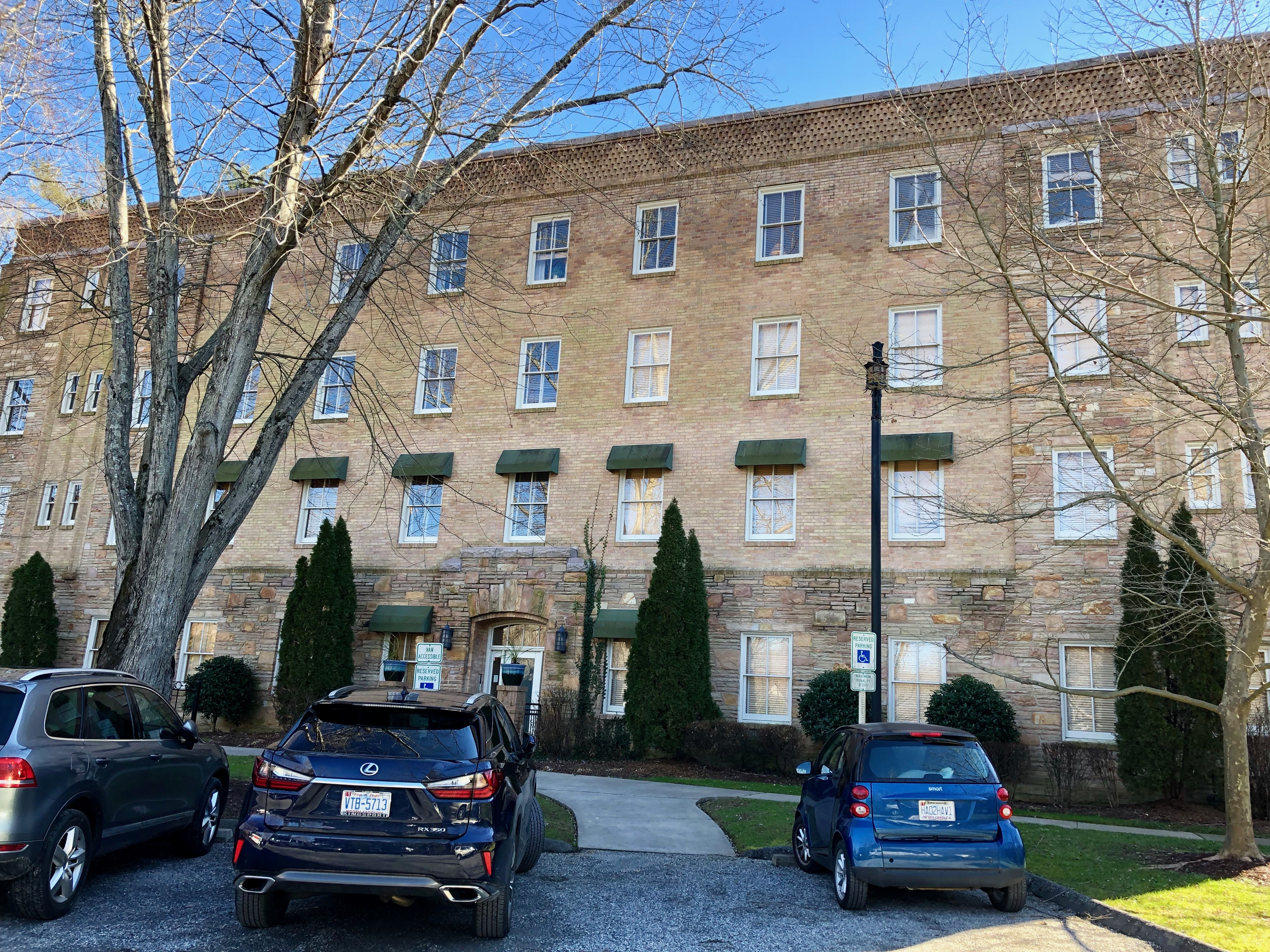
- Battle Wing, Biltmore Hospital, January 2019

- Location within North Carolina Location within the United States
- Location: 14 All Souls Crescent, Asheville, North Carolina
- Coordinates: 35°33′52″N 82°32′29″W
- Area: 1.9 acres (0.77 ha)
- Built: 1929-1930, 1953
- Built by: Geary, John M.
- Architect: Ellington, Douglas
- Architectural style: Tudor Revival
- MPS: Biltmore Village MRA
- NRHP reference No.: 05000938
- Added to NRHP: September 1, 2005

Biltmore Hospital, also known as the Biltmore Hospital Extension and Memorial Mission Hospital, is a historic hospital building located at Biltmore Village, Asheville, Buncombe County, North Carolina. It was built in 1929–1930, and originally known as the Battle Wing to the Clarence Barker Memorial Hospital. It is a four-story, 13 bay by 3 bay, brick and stone building with a flat roof and Tudor Revival style design elements. A two-story wing was completed in 1953 for the Imperial Life Insurance Company. Also on the property are contributing culverts and a sign.

It was listed on the National Register of Historic Places in 2005.
