= Biltmore Village Cottage District =

Historic district in North Carolina, United States

- U.S. National Register of Historic Places
- U.S. Historic district
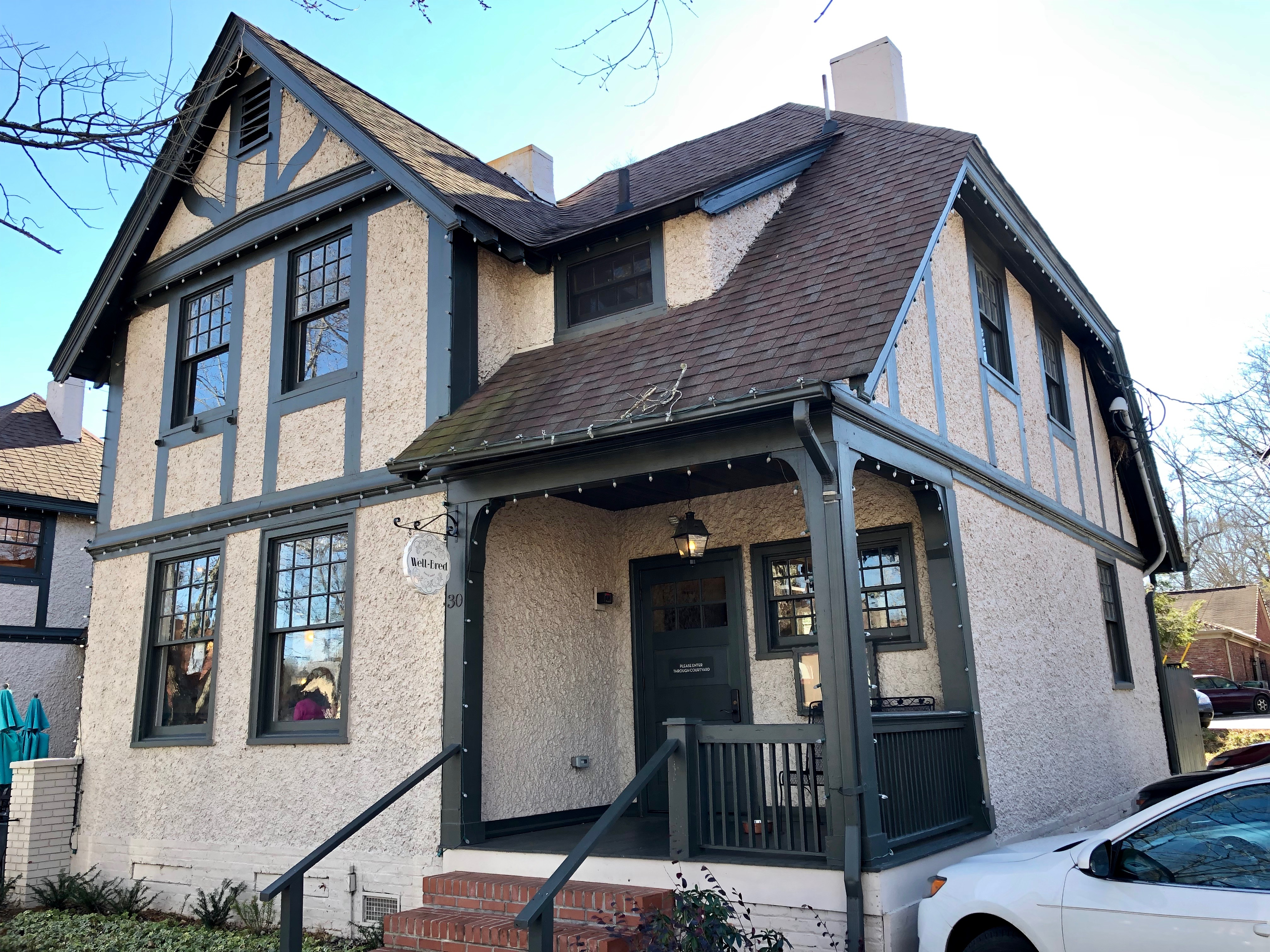
- Boston Way, Biltmore Village Cottage District, January 2019

- Location within North Carolina Location within the United States
- Location: Swan St., All Souls Crescent and Boston Way, Asheville, North Carolina
- Coordinates: 35°33′58″N 82°32′29″W
- Area: 9.9 acres (4.0 ha)
- Built: c. 1900
- Built by: Vanderbilt, George W.
- Architect: Smith, Richard Sharp
- MPS: Biltmore Village MRA
- NRHP reference No.: 79001671
- Added to NRHP: November 15, 1979

Biltmore Village Cottage District is a national historic district located in Asheville, Buncombe County, North Carolina. The district encompasses 14 contributing residential buildings in Biltmore Village. They were designed by Richard Sharp Smith and built about 1900 for George W. Vanderbilt. The dwellings are 1 1/2- to two-story, pebbledash finished half-timbered cottages with recessed porches, multiple gables, steeply pitched roofs, simple molded trim, one or more brick chimneys, and brick foundations.

It was listed on the National Register of Historic Places in 1979.

== Gallery ==
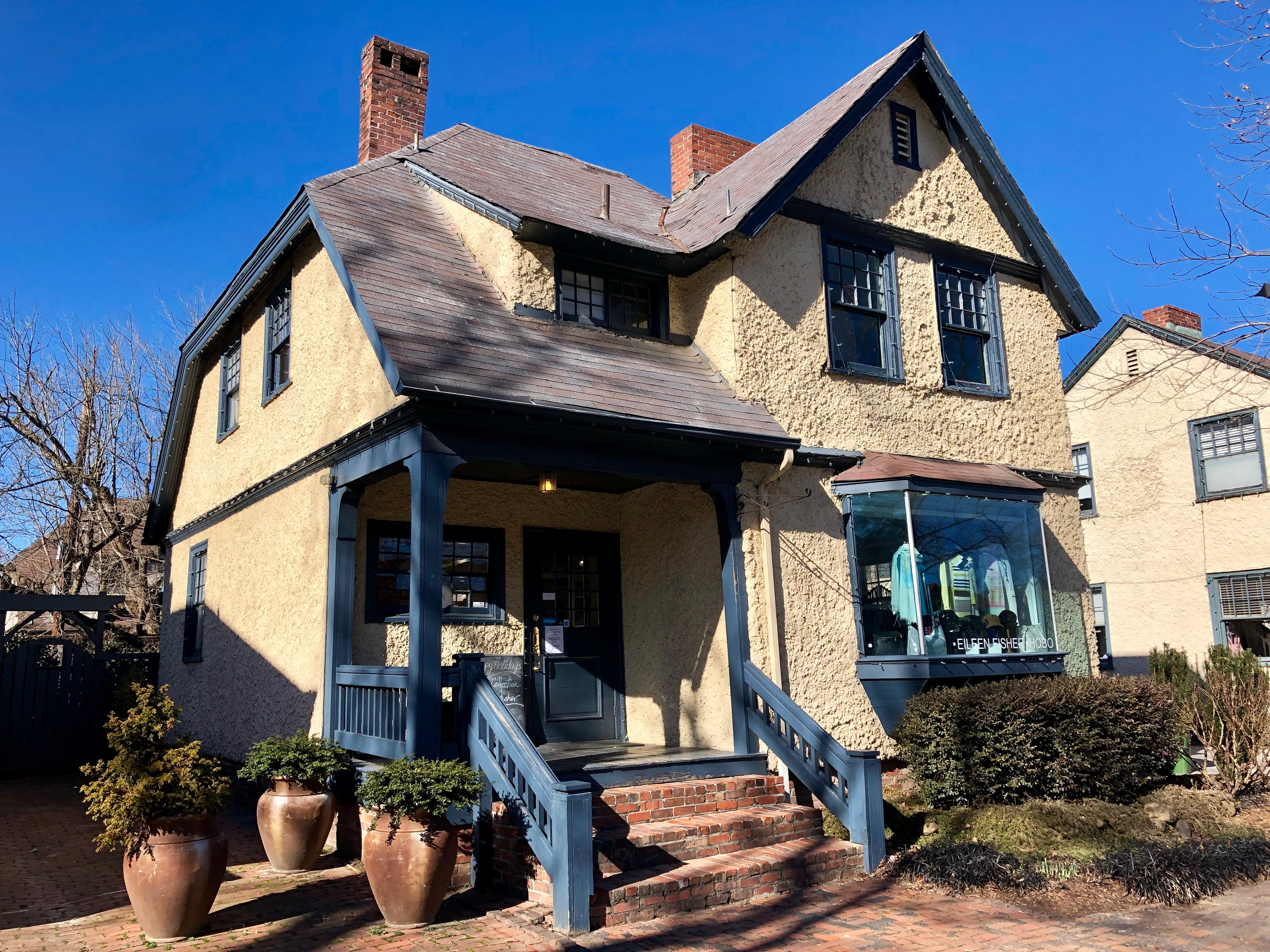
4 All Souls Crescent, 2019

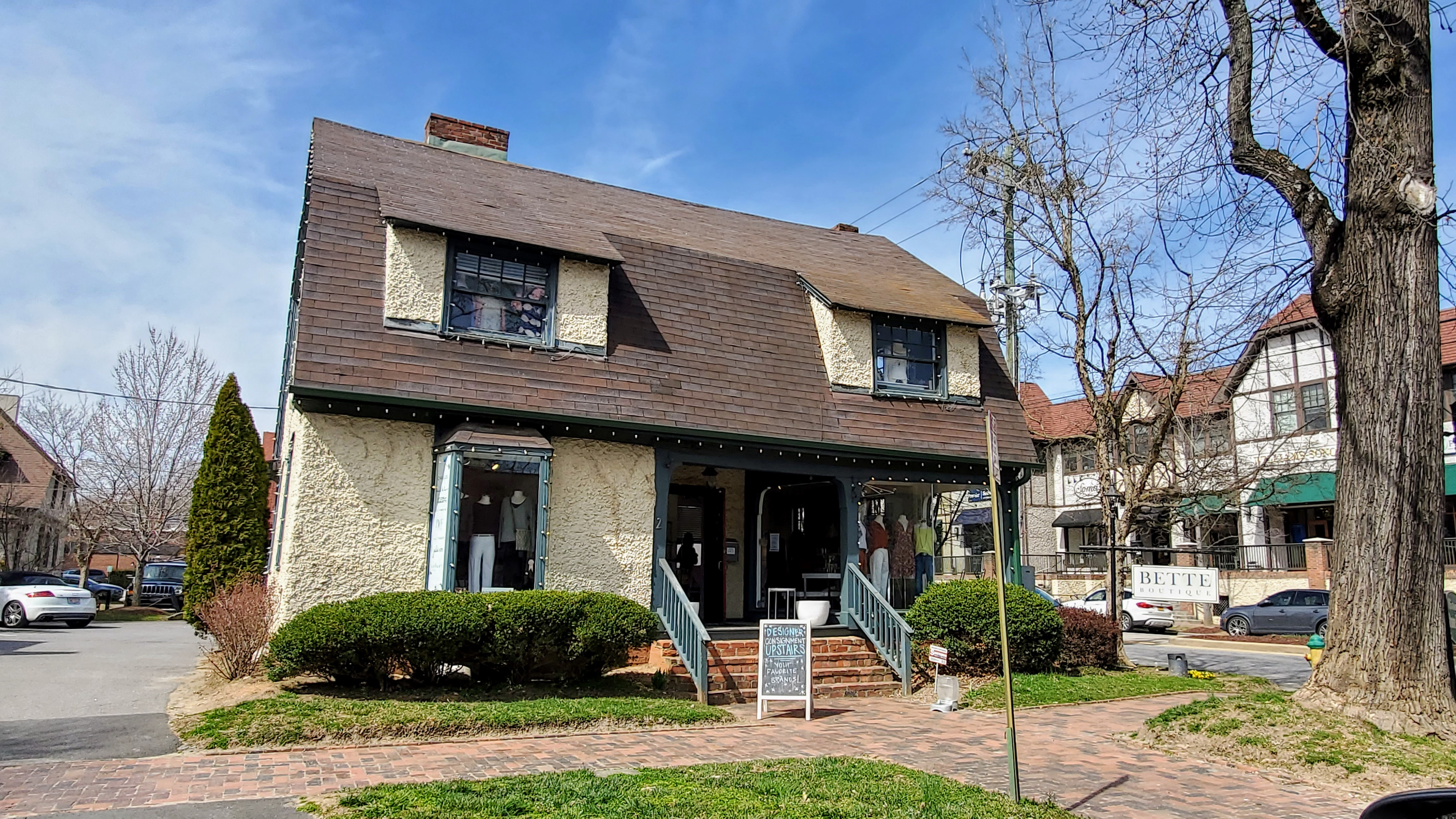
2 All Souls Crescent, 2021

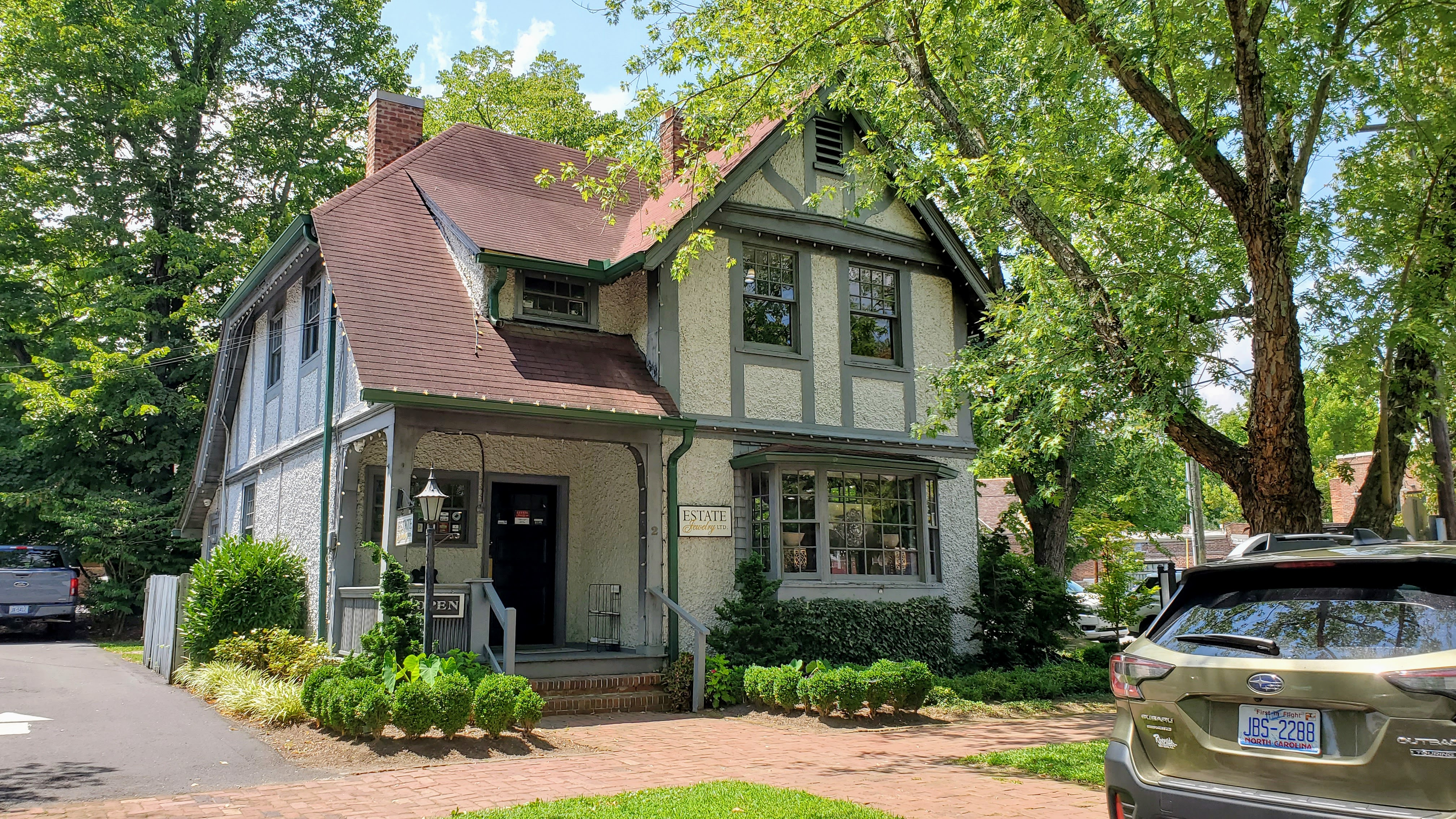
2 Boston Way, 2021

== See also ==
- Biltmore Village Cottages
- Biltmore Village Commercial Buildings
- Biltmore Shoe Store
