= The Dayton Biltmore Hotel =

Historic hotel in Dayton, Ohio, US

- Biltmore Hotel
- U.S. National Register of Historic Places
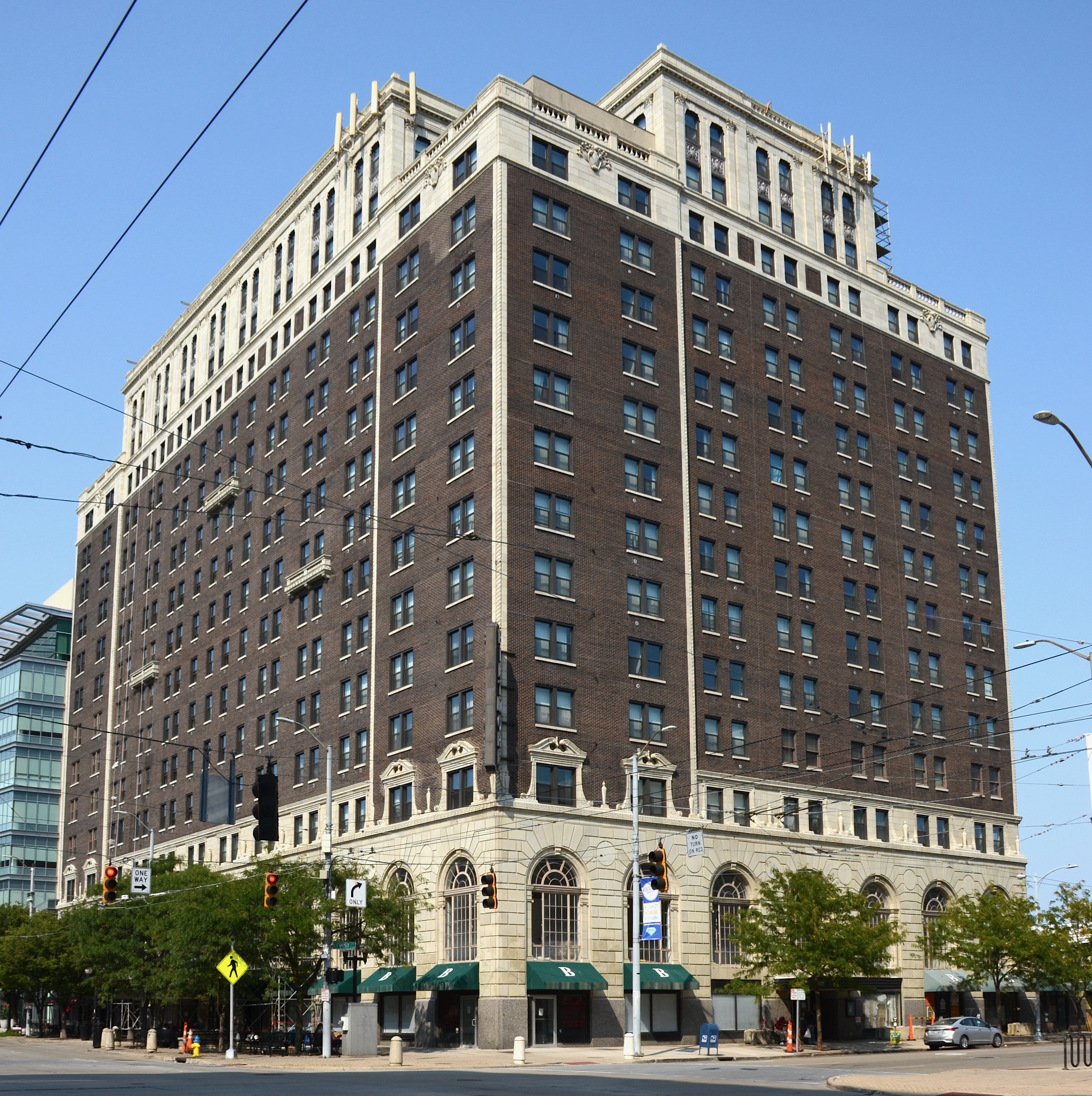
- From the south-southwest in 2021

- Location within Ohio Location within the United States
- Location: 210 North Main Street, Dayton, Ohio 45402
- Nearest city: Dayton, Ohio
- Coordinates: 39°46′17″N 84°11′31″W
- Architect: Frederick Hughes
- Architectural style: Beaux Arts
- NRHP reference No.: 82003616
- Added to NRHP: 1982-02-03

The Dayton Biltmore Hotel is a historic former hotel built in 1929 and located at the junction of First and Main Streets in downtown Dayton, Ohio, United States. It was converted to senior citizen housing in 1981 and added to the National Register of Historic Places in 1982. In 2020, it was acquired by Related Companies, which purchased the property from Aimco.

== History ==
=== Hotel ===
Opened on November 16, 1929, the Dayton Biltmore Hotel was designed in the Beaux-Arts style popular at the time. It features an applied masonry façade system, exhibiting both brick and terra cotta, resulting in a dark brown and white exterior. The architect, Frederick Hughes (of the architecture firm F.J. Hughes and Company), is also known for the nearby Commodore Apartments and the Centre City Building, which were designed in a similar style. One of the tallest buildings in Dayton, the Biltmore was considered one of the finest hotels in America, playing host to some of the nation's most powerful and celebrated men in the 20th century, such as John F. Kennedy and Elvis Presley.

The Dayton Biltmore was originally operated by Bowman-Biltmore Hotels. It was purchased by Hilton Hotels in 1946. The Dayton Biltmore became a Sheraton in March 1965 and was renamed the Sheraton-Dayton Hotel. It left Sheraton in 1974 and became the Biltmore Towers Hotel.

=== Apartments ===
In 1981, the Kuhlmann Design Group redeveloped the property into elderly housing, known as Biltmore Towers. On February 3, 1982, the Dayton Biltmore was added to the National Register of Historic Places, qualifying because of its historically significant architecture.

The building houses 230 apartments ranging in size from 500 sqft 1-bedrooms to 713 sqft 2-bedrooms. It caters to residents 55 years and older and is a Section 8 property, with rents subsidized by the United States Department of Housing and Urban Development. In 2022, it was renovated, at a cost of $20 million. The building is situated alongside the Great Miami River, steps away from Riverscape Metropark, Victoria Theater, Cooper Park, and Courthouse Square.

In addition to the apartments, the property also contains seven retail spaces, totaling 37,885 square feet (3,519.6 m^{2}). The current business tenants are the Chinese restaurant Liu Garden, a Jimmy John's restaurant, Liberty Tax Services, and St. Mary's, resident services on the 4th floor. Previous tenants include Wendy's, Rock Star Sub Sandwiches, Ernie Loeb's restaurant, and a physician's office.

== Gallery ==
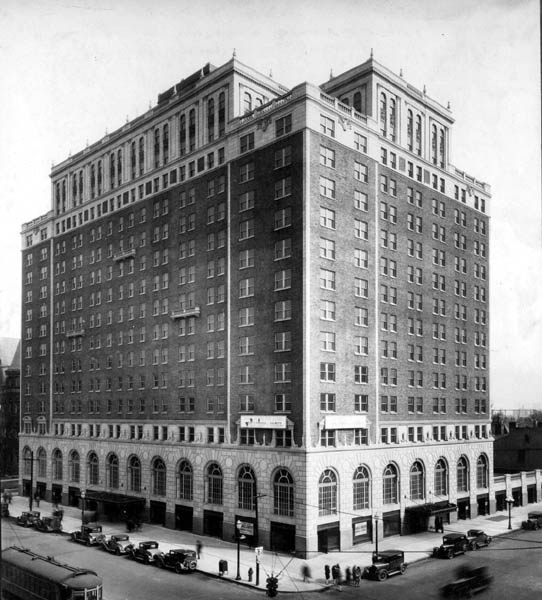
The Dayton Biltmore Hotel in the 1930s

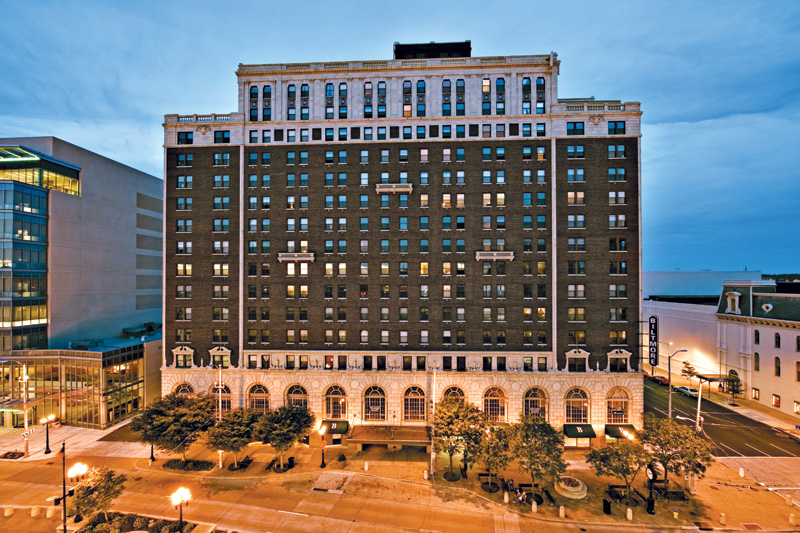
Biltmore Towers at dusk

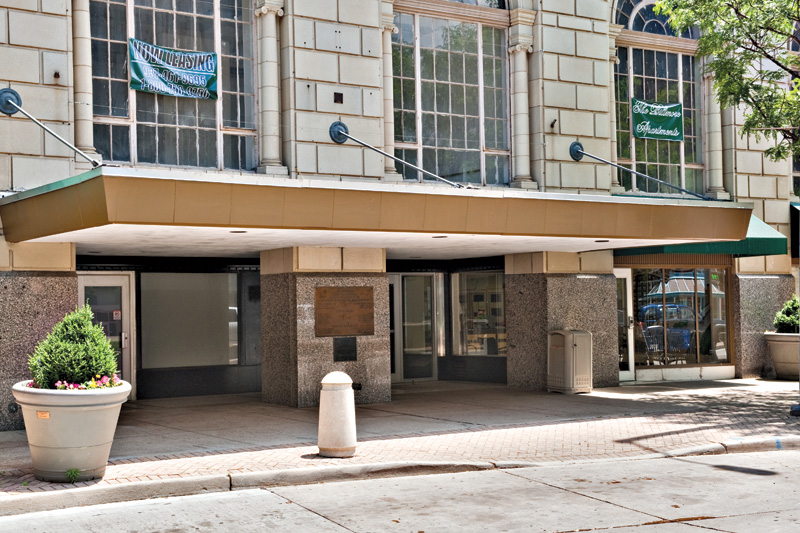
Entrance

== See also ==
- National Register of Historic Places listings in Dayton, Ohio
