= Branchville station (South Carolina) =

- Southern Railway Passenger Depot
- U.S. National Register of Historic Places
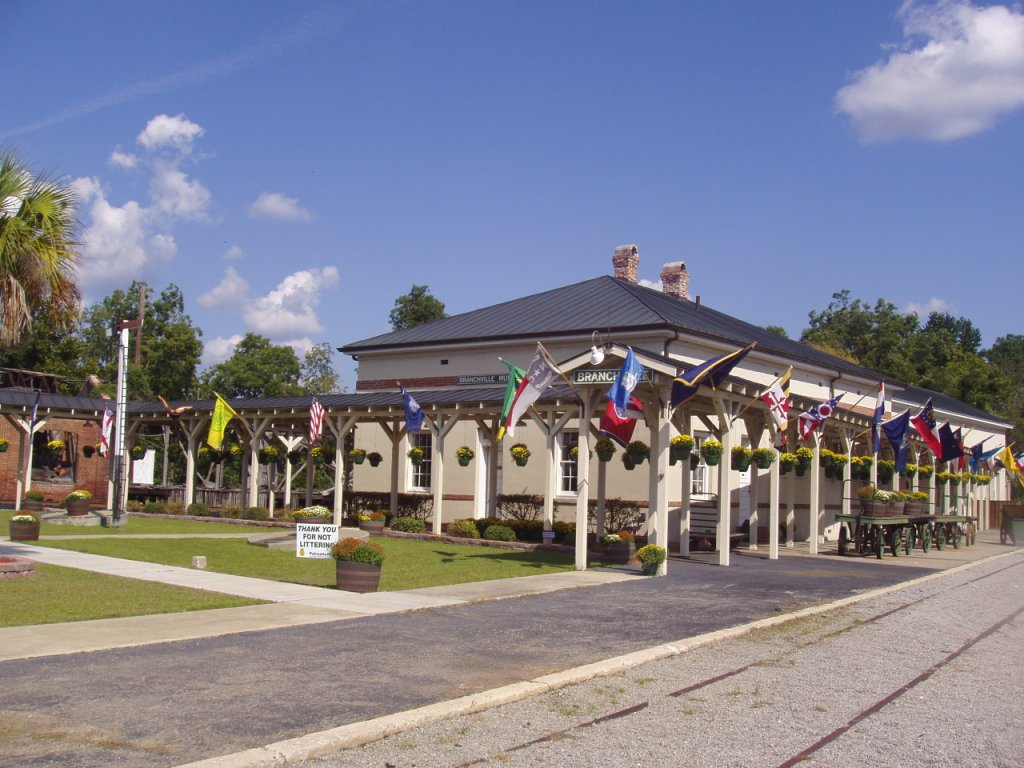
- Branchville Depot, September 2007

- Location within South Carolina Location within the United States
- Location: 110 N. Main St., Branchville, South Carolina
- Coordinates: 33°15′4″N 80°48′57″W
- Area: 3 acres (1.2 ha)
- Built: 1877
- NRHP reference No.: 73001723
- Added to NRHP: April 23, 1973

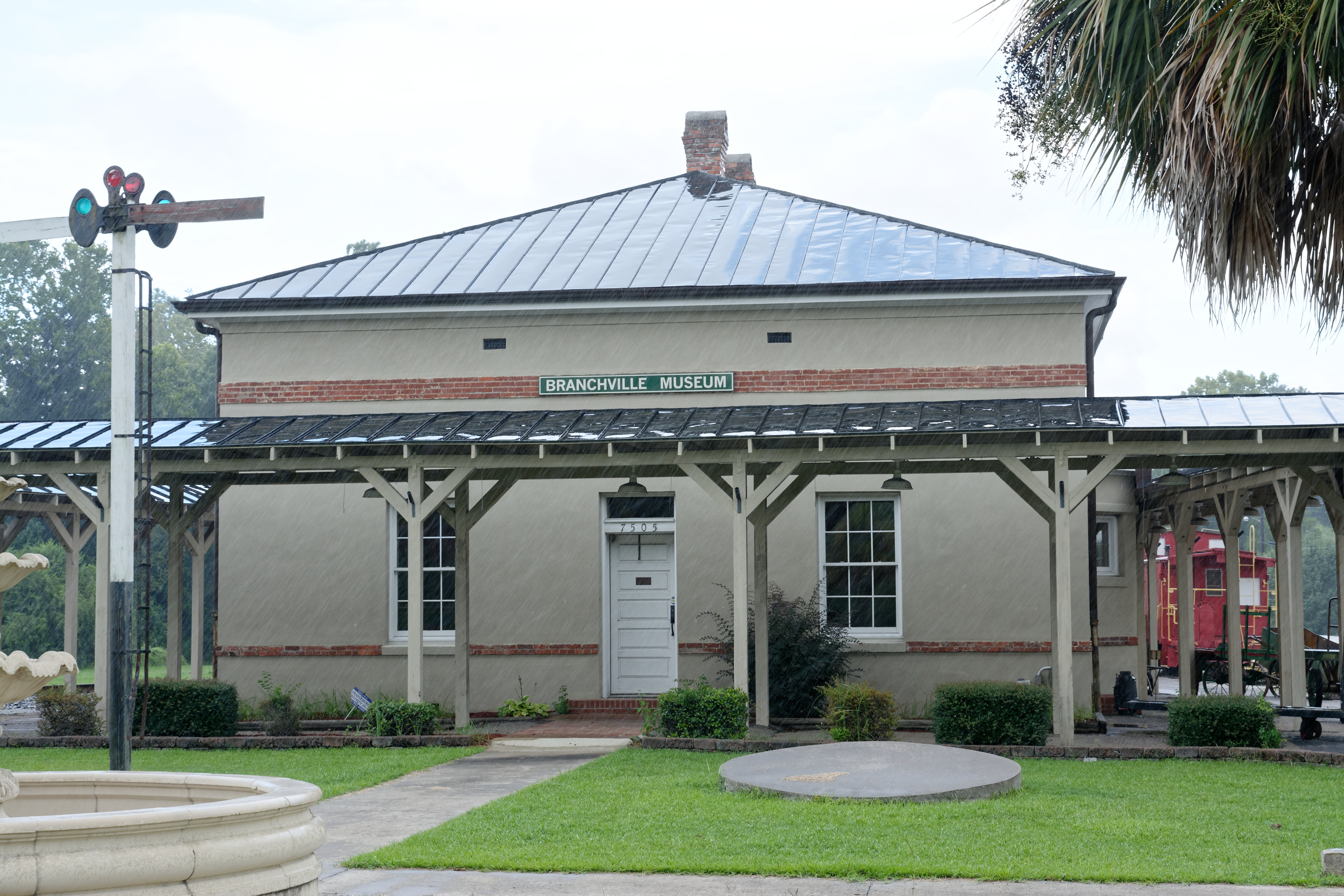
In 2016

Southern Railway Passenger Depot, also known as Branchville Depot, is a historic train station located at Branchville, Orangeburg County, South Carolina. It was built in 1877 by the Southern Railway. It is a one-story, brick building with a stucco finish and hipped roof. It was the site of a speech given by President-elect William Howard Taft in 1909.

It was added to the National Register of Historic Places in 1973.

Preceding station	Southern Railway	Following station
Edisto toward Augusta	Augusta – Charleston	Fifty Eight toward Charleston
Sixty Six toward Greenville	Greenville – Branchville	Terminus
