= Biltmore Apartments =

Historic building in Portland, Oregon, U.S.

- U.S. National Register of Historic Places
- U.S. Historic district – Contributing property
- Portland Historic Landmark
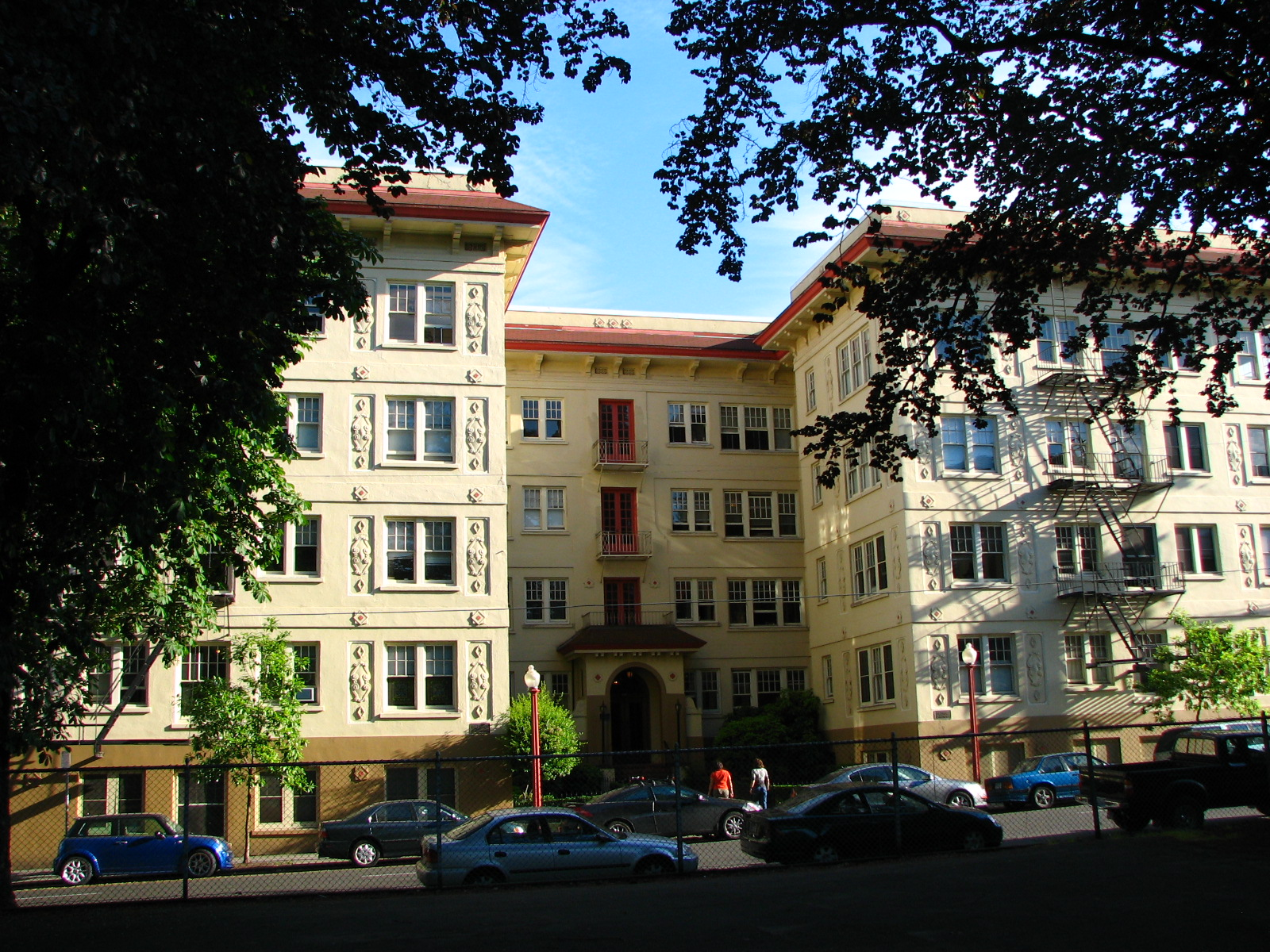

- Location within Portland, Oregon Location within Oregon Location within the United States
- Location: 2014 NW Glisan Street; Portland, Oregon
- Coordinates: 45°31′34″N 122°41′34″W
- Built: 1924
- Architect: John H. Grant
- Architectural style: Late 19th and 20th century revivals, Mediterranean revival
- Part of: Alphabet Historic District (ID00001293)
- NRHP reference No.: 91000041
- Added to NRHP: February 20, 1991

The Biltmore Apartments is a building complex located in northwest Portland, Oregon listed on the National Register of Historic Places.

== See also ==
- National Register of Historic Places listings in Northwest Portland, Oregon
