= Skylands =

Skylands may refer to:

- Skylands, the setting of Skylanders
- Skylands, the second zone of the 2009 video game Henry Hatsworth in the Puzzling Adventure
- Skylands (estate), an estate property located in New Jersey
- Skylands Region, a region in New Jersey, the states most northern region
- Martha Stewart's estate in Seal Harbour, Maine

== See also ==
- Skyland
