= Branchville and Bowman Railroad =

The Branchville and Bowman Railroad was a shortline railroad that began just after Reconstruction and survived until the mid-1920s.

The Branchville and Bowman Railroad, was a successor of sorts of the Smoak tramway, a three-foot gauge wooden-railed logging line built in 1884, which served the Smoak family mill in Branchville, South Carolina.

The Branchville and Bowman was chartered in 1890 with a goal of creating a line to the new town of Bowman, South Carolina, and construction on the 11-mile line was completed in 1893. It retained the three-foot gauge of its predecessor.

By 1925 the line was struggling. It was down to one locomotive and eight worn-out units of rolling stock. The line had been leased and operated by Earl and Walter Dukes since 1920, and the pair purchased it. They immediately ended the railroad operation and obtained in exchange an operating certificate issued by the State of South Carolina for highway motor transport. This was possible because the trucking industry was overseen by the State Board of Railroad Commissioners at this time.

Readers desiring a more detailed history of the Branchville and Bowman Railroad should consult the book The Early History of the Communities of Bowman, South Carolina, by Linda Carter Smith (compiler), published by the Orangeburg County Historical Society, second printing by Lulu, July 2013.
