= The Biltmore Agreement =

The Biltmore Agreement ultimately settled the press war between newspapers, which had refused their news services to their electronic competitors, and radio.

During the Golden age of radio, there was a decline in newspaper revenues. Radio began advertising, and advertisers began to give their business to radio, because it was a new, exciting, and creative way to communicate with their customers. Thus, newspapers were not happy about the new trend in radio advertising, due to the depression and the fact that advertisers wanted to convert to this new medium.

Newspapers were also distressed with the fact that radio was able to report breaking news faster, and with more animation. Newspapers could no longer publicize breaking news, because the people already knew. The first radio broadcast on KDKA had been the news of the election returns on November 2, 1920. KDKA came on-air at 8:00 PM, and the election returns were phoned in to the studio from the Pittsburgh Post. Almost immediately, the newspapers regretted their collaboration with the radio station.

The press associations including the Associated Press and the United Press, which depended on the newspapers for their main sources of news and income, were pressured to discontinue providing news to radio stations. Radio stations fought this decision in 1933, and came to an agreement where they were able to briefly allow the press associations to continue providing news.

They then developed the Biltmore Agreement, in December 1933, where broadcasters agreed to aggressively restrict their broadcasting of news in return for the newspapers continuance of their publication of radio listings. Radio stations agreed to broadcast no longer than five minutes of news, twice per day, while using information supplied by the newspapers. They also agreed to have no sponsors, and have no single story containing more than 30 words. Stations were also forced to include the announcement: "See your daily newspaper for further details." Among other things, stations could only broadcast news after 9:30 AM for morning news, and after 9:00 PM for evening news, ensuring that people were likely to already have received their morning and evening newspapers.

This, however, did not end the feud between newspapers and radio. Local newspapers began feuds with local radio stations. Newspapers also refused to publish anything positive about local radio stations, including information concerning programs that the stations aired, or provide any kind of advertising for their station. Newspapers also reported news, suggesting that newspapers were a better news and advertising medium than radio. Many believe that radio gave into this agreement because they feared the power of the newspapers. People understood that this agreement was excessive and unfair to broadcasters. Meanwhile, others valued the Biltmore Agreement for resolving “the troublesome, wasteful and ramifying antagonism between the news press and radio broadcasting.” The agreement broke down within a couple of years, as newspapers discovered how profitable owning radio stations could be.
