= Skyland Special =

Overview
- Service type: Inter-city rail
- Status: Discontinued
- Locale: Southeastern United States
- Predecessor: Land of the Sky Special
- First service: 1927
- Last service: 1958
- Former operator(s): Southern Railway (U.S.)

Route
- Termini: Asheville, North Carolina; Jacksonville, Florida
- Distance travelled: 467.8 miles (752.9 km) (Asheville-Jacksonville, 1952)
- Service frequency: Daily
- Train number(s): 10-23 (southbound) and 24-9 (northbound)

On-board services
- Seating arrangements: Reclining seat coach
- Sleeping arrangements: Sections, double bedrooms, and drawing rooms (1952)
- Catering facilities: Dinette-coach

Technical
- Track gauge: 4 ft 8 1/2 in (1,435 mm)

The Skyland Special was a long distance named night train of the Southern Railway from Asheville, North Carolina, to Jacksonville, Florida, USA. Apart from the Southern's trains originating in Cincinnati, the Skyland Special was distinctive as an all-Southern Railway operation (without the co-operation of another rail carrier) going directly to Florida. It was also one of the few Southern Railway trains making a direct north-south route through South Carolina. In early years, the train had sections that continued to various destinations in Florida.

== Predecessor train ==
The train was preceded in the 1920s by a lengthier incarnation with a similar name and a much longer and more complicated route, the Land of the Sky Special. This train had originating points in the north, in Cincinnati and St. Louis; the sections linked at Danville, Kentucky and proceeded south to Knoxville, Tennessee. Another section linked from Nashville to Knoxville. From there the train continued to Asheville, and then followed the route that the Skyland Special took for three decades.

== Latter years of service ==
During World War II the Skyland Special went out of service. It returned in 1947. Two years later the train terminated in Jacksonville. Passengers wishing to go to St. Petersburg or Miami changed to Florida East Coast Railway or Seaboard Air Line Railroad coaches bound for those destinations in Jacksonville. The train lost its mail contract in 1957 and the Southern cancelled the train altogether from its schedule by August 1958.
