= Branchville, South Carolina =

- Town
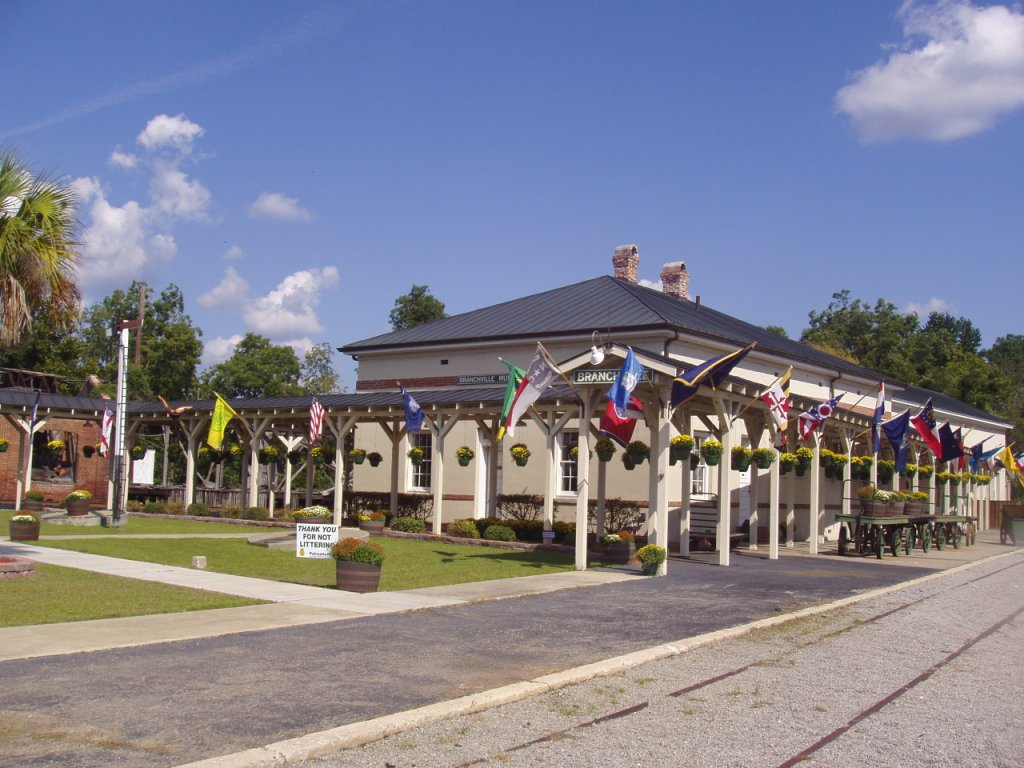
- Depot during Raylrode Daze 2007

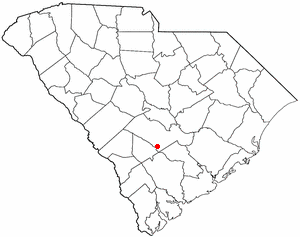
- Location in Orangeburg County, South Carolina
- Coordinates: 33°14′56″N 80°48′58″W
- Country: United States
- State: South Carolina
- County: Orangeburg
- Established: 1715

Area
  - Total: 3.17 sq mi (8.20 km^{2})
  - Land: 3.17 sq mi (8.20 km^{2})
  - Water: 0 sq mi (0.00 km^{2})
- Elevation: 125 ft (38 m)

Population (2020)
  - Total: 998
  - Density: 315.1/sq mi (121.66/km^{2})
- Time zone: UTC-5 (EST)
  - Summer (DST): UTC-4 (EDT)
- ZIP code: 29432
- Area codes: 803, 839
- FIPS code: 45-08245
- GNIS feature ID: 2405313
- Website: branchville.sc.gov

Branchville is a town in Orangeburg County, South Carolina, United States. As of the 2020 census, Branchville had a population of 998.

== History ==
The community was so named because a railroad branch began at the town site.

Branchville, located on the southern tip of Orangeburg County, is home to the world's oldest railroad junction. The junction was built in 1828 and ran from Charleston to Branchville and was on the route of the country's first scheduled train. For more than a century, Branchville's economy was based on railroad passenger service.

The Southern Railway Passenger Depot was added to the National Register of Historic Places in 1973.

== Geography ==
Branchville is located at 33°15′7″N 80°49′4″W (33.252055, -80.817778).

According to the United States Census Bureau, the town has a total area of 3.3 square miles (8.5 km^{2}), all land.

== Demographics ==
Historical population
Census	Pop.	Note	%±
1870	366		—
1880	517		41.3%
1890	732		41.6%
1900	1,101		50.4%
1910	1,471		33.6%
1920	1,814		23.3%
1930	1,689		−6.9%
1940	1,351		−20.0%
1950	1,353		0.1%
1960	1,182		−12.6%
1970	1,011		−14.5%
1980	1,769		75.0%
1990	1,107		−37.4%
2000	1,083		−2.2%
2010	1,024		−5.4%
2020	998		−2.5%
U.S. Decennial Census

Branchville town, South Carolina – Racial and ethnic composition Note: the US Census treats Hispanic/Latino as an ethnic category. This table excludes Latinos from the racial categories and assigns them to a separate category. Hispanics/Latinos may be of any race.
Race / Ethnicity (NH = Non-Hispanic)	Pop 2000	Pop 2010	Pop 2020	% 2000	% 2010	% 2020
White alone (NH)	587	517	532	54.20%	50.49%	53.31%
Black or African American alone (NH)	461	468	416	42.57%	45.70%	41.68%
Native American or Alaska Native alone (NH)	2	11	8	0.18%	1.07%	0.80%
Asian alone (NH)	0	2	7	0.00%	0.20%	0.70%
Native Hawaiian or Pacific Islander alone (NH)	0	0	0	0.00%	0.00%	0.00%
Other race alone (NH)	7	1	4	0.65%	0.10%	0.40%
Mixed race or Multiracial (NH)	11	9	24	1.02%	0.88%	2.40%
Hispanic or Latino (any race)	15	16	7	1.39%	1.56%	0.70%
Total	1,083	1,024	998	100.00%	100.00%	100.00%

As of the 2020 United States census, there were 998 people, 450 households, and 263 families residing in the town.

=== 2000 census ===
As of the census of 2000, there were 1,083 people, 446 households, and 276 families residing in the town. The population density was 331.2 inhabitants per square mile (127.9/km^{2}). There were 508 housing units at an average density of 155.3 per square mile (60.0/km^{2}). The racial makeup of the town was 54.48% White, 43.12% African American, 0.18% Native American, 0.09% Asian, 1.11% from other races, and 1.02% from two or more races. Hispanic or Latino of any race were 1.39% of the population.

There were 446 households, out of which 27.8% had children under the age of 18 living with them, 41.7% were married couples living together, 16.6% had a female householder with no husband present, and 37.9% were non-families. 35.7% of all households were made up of individuals, and 15.5% had someone living alone who was 65 years of age or older. The average household size was 2.39 and the average family size was 3.12.

In the town, the population was spread out, with 26.3% under the age of 18, 9.1% from 18 to 24, 24.0% from 25 to 44, 24.6% from 45 to 64, and 16.0% who were 65 years of age or older. The median age was 38 years. For every 100 females, there were 84.2 males. For every 100 females age 18 and over, there were 72.7 males.

The median income for a household in the town was $22,429, and the median income for a family was $34,625. Males had a median income of $26,607 versus $20,917 for females. The per capita income for the town was $14,509. About 17.5% of families and 20.7% of the population were below the poverty line, including 27.8% of those under age 18 and 18.6% of those age 65 or over.

== Notable people ==
- Marion Bowman Jr., perpetrator in the murder of Kandee Martin, born and raised in Branchville

== See also ==
- Branchville and Bowman Railroad
