= Biltmore Village =

Village in North Carolina, US

Coordinates: 35.56445°N 82.54041°W

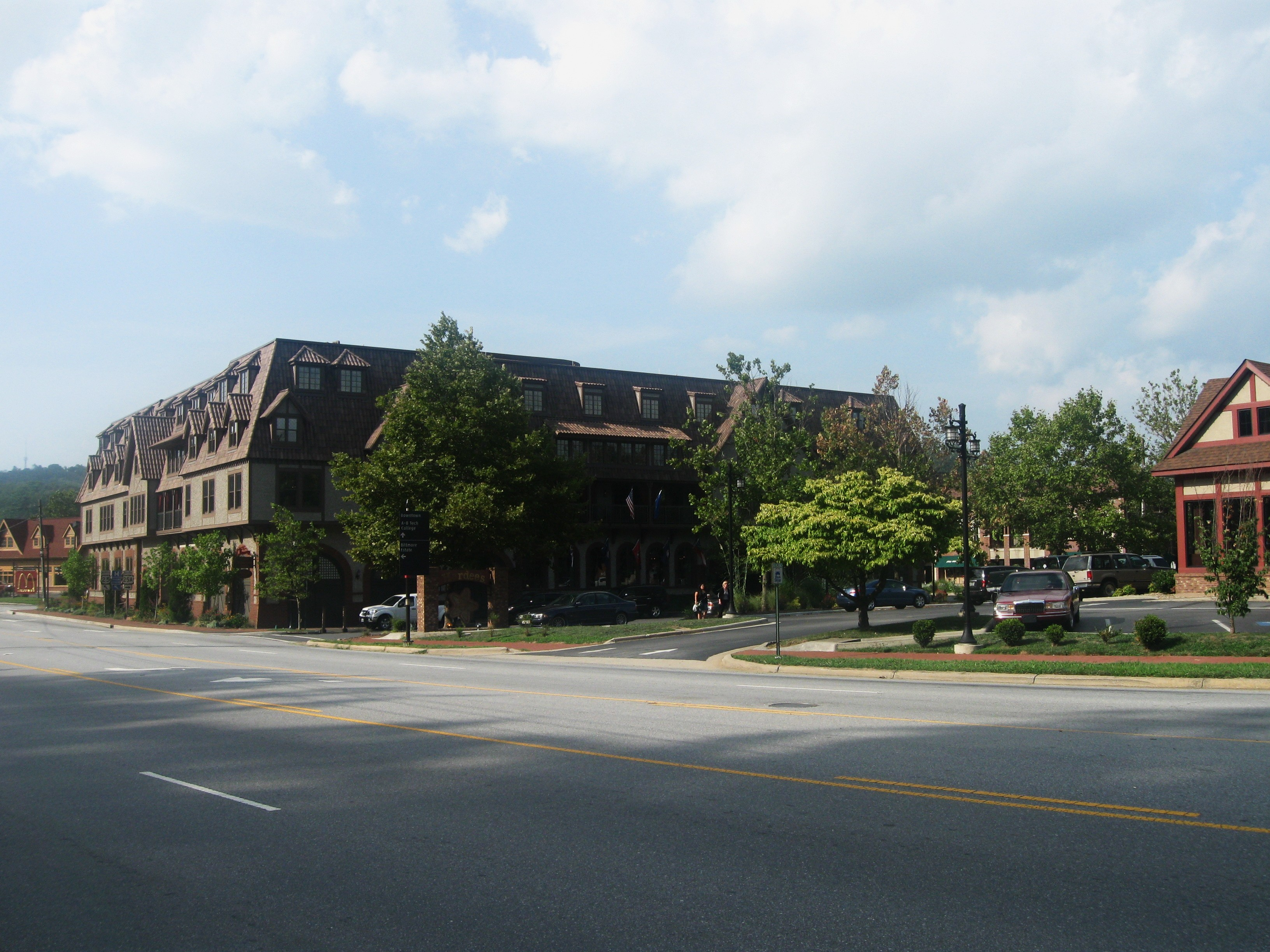
The Grand Bohemian Hotel, built in 2009 to match the area's historic architecture

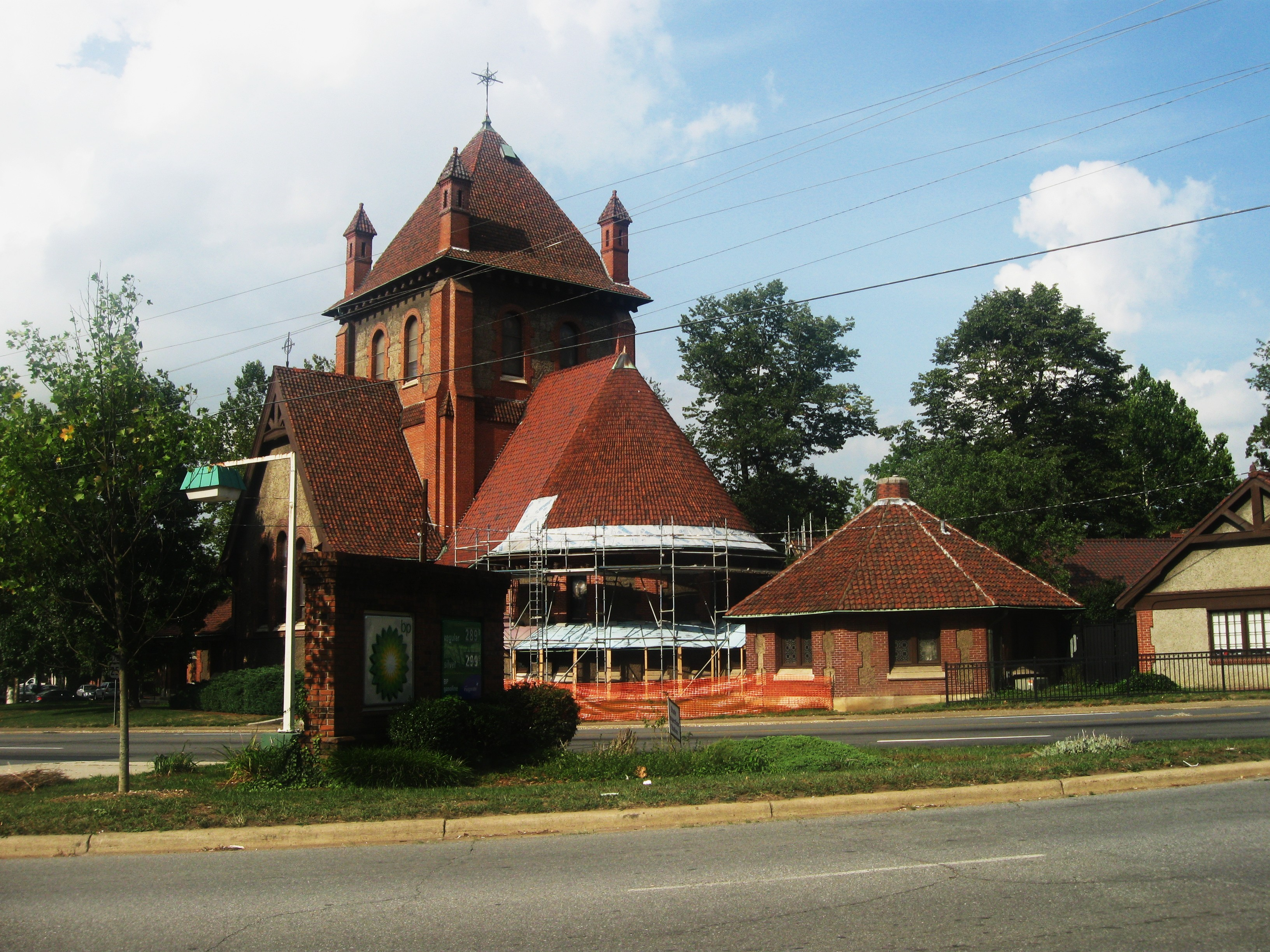
Cathedral of All Souls undergoing renovation

Biltmore Village, formerly Best, is a small village that is now entirely in the city limits of Asheville, North Carolina. It is adjacent to the main entrance of the Biltmore Estate, built by George W. Vanderbilt, one of the heirs to the Vanderbilt family fortune. Once known as the town of Best, Vanderbilt created this village as a "company town" for the estate workers. The community was planned and designed to reflect the qualities of an English country village. The village has its own church, which is still in operation today as the Cathedral of All Souls, an Episcopal cathedral. The village also had a hospital, shops, a school, a train station, and other services available.

Biltmore Village was incorporated into the City of Asheville in the early 20th century. Biltmore Village is now a commercial district that has an eclectic collection of shops, restaurants, and other businesses. The village has been home to the main office of monthly news magazine World since 2011.

== Historic floods ==
In July 1916, Biltmore Village was flooded by up to nine feet of water during the Great Flood of 1916.

In September 2024, Biltmore Village was flooded by up to six feet of water from the Swannanoa River during Hurricane Helene. After the flood, residents reported foul smelling mud in the area that contaminated Biltmore Village. The mud is reportedly toxic, and is from the plastic manufacturer in Asheville.

== Building standards ==
Biltmore Village enforces rigorous standards for new construction and the restoration of existing buildings to preserve historical authenticity. Consequently, even corporate buildings, such as McDonald's, were required to be altered to comply with Biltmore Village's guidelines. However, these standards have been cited as a factor contributing to a slower post-Helene reconstruction process in the area, due to the time required to secure professionals qualified to meet the historic village's requirements.

== See also ==
- Biltmore Village Cottage District
- Biltmore Village Cottages
- Biltmore Village Commercial Buildings
