= West Asheville End of Car Line Historic District =

Historic district in North Carolina, United States

- U.S. National Register of Historic Places
- U.S. Historic district
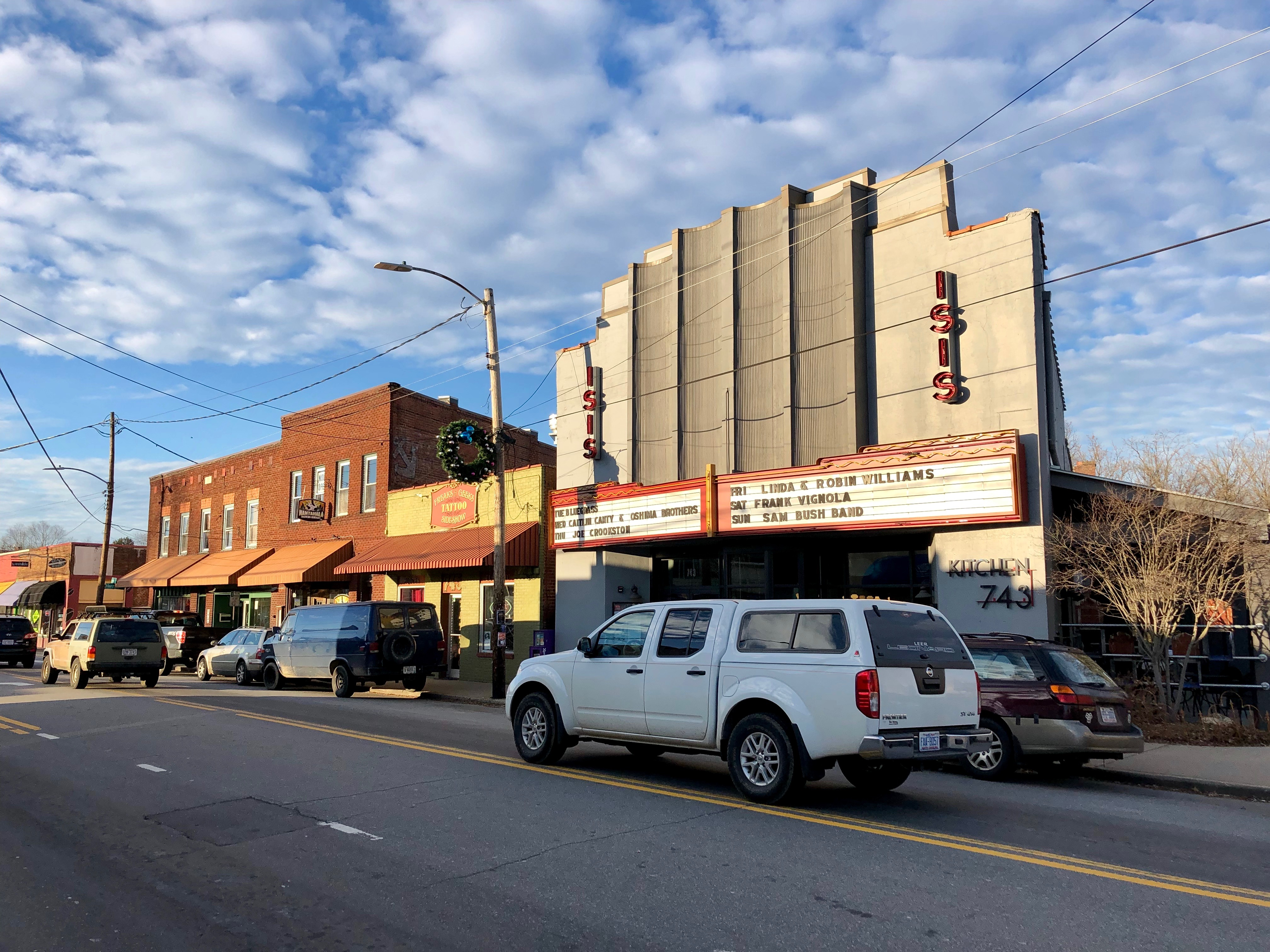
- Franklin Building, Mays Market, Star Cleaners & Isis Theater, January 2019

- Location within North Carolina Location within the United States
- Location: Both sides of Haywood Rd. from 715 to 814 and 7-9 Brevard Rd., Asheville, North Carolina
- Coordinates: 35°34′41″N 82°35′39″W
- Area: 12 acres (4.9 ha)
- Built: 1916
- Architectural style: Early Commercial, Bungalow/craftsman
- NRHP reference No.: 06000691
- Added to NRHP: August 9, 2006

West Asheville End of Car Line Historic District is a national historic district located at Asheville, Buncombe County, North Carolina. The district encompasses 24 contributing buildings in a primarily commercial section of West Asheville. It includes a nearly continuous row of one and two-story brick and concrete block commercial buildings that date from 1916 through the mid-1930s. Their development was influenced by streetcar service along the Haywood Road corridor that operated from 1910 to 1934. Notable buildings include the separately listed Bledsoe Building, along with the Isis Theater (1937), Franklin Building (1923), Pure Oil Station (1947), Wells Building (1917), Palace Theater (1928), Great A&P Tea Company (1926), and West Asheville Post Office (1929).

It was listed on the National Register of Historic Places in 2006.

== Gallery ==
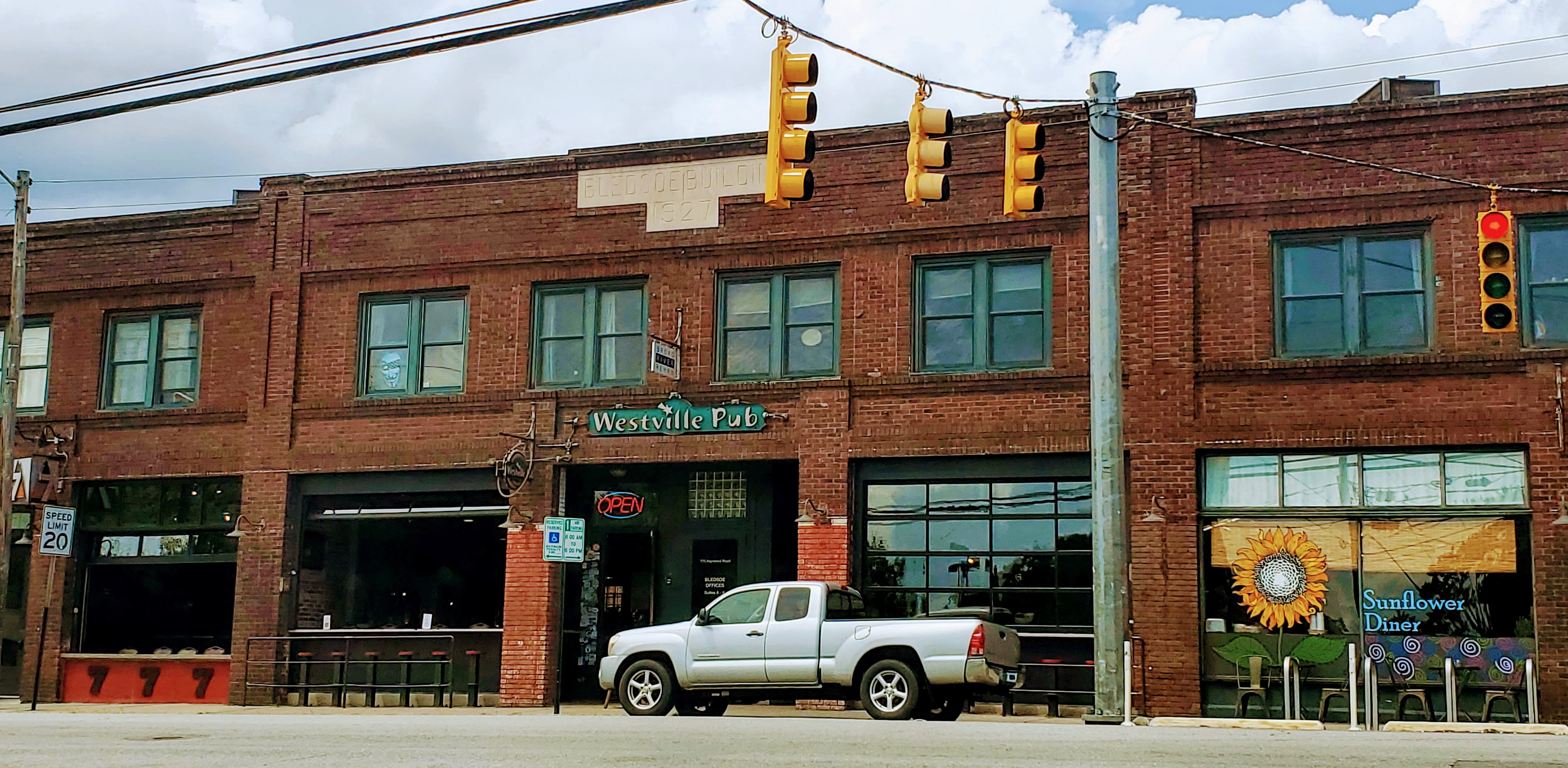
Bledsoe Building, 2021

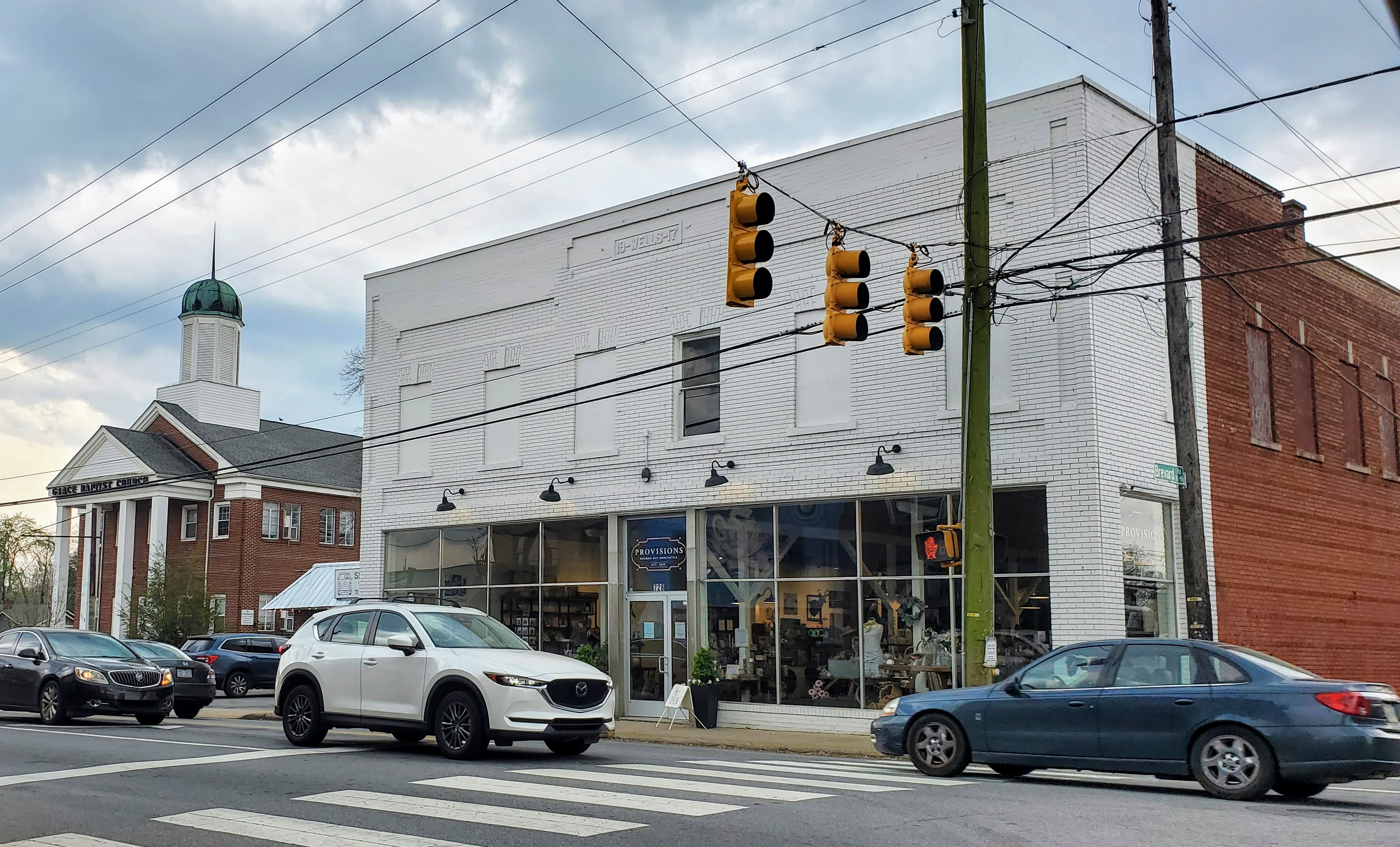
Wells Building, 2021

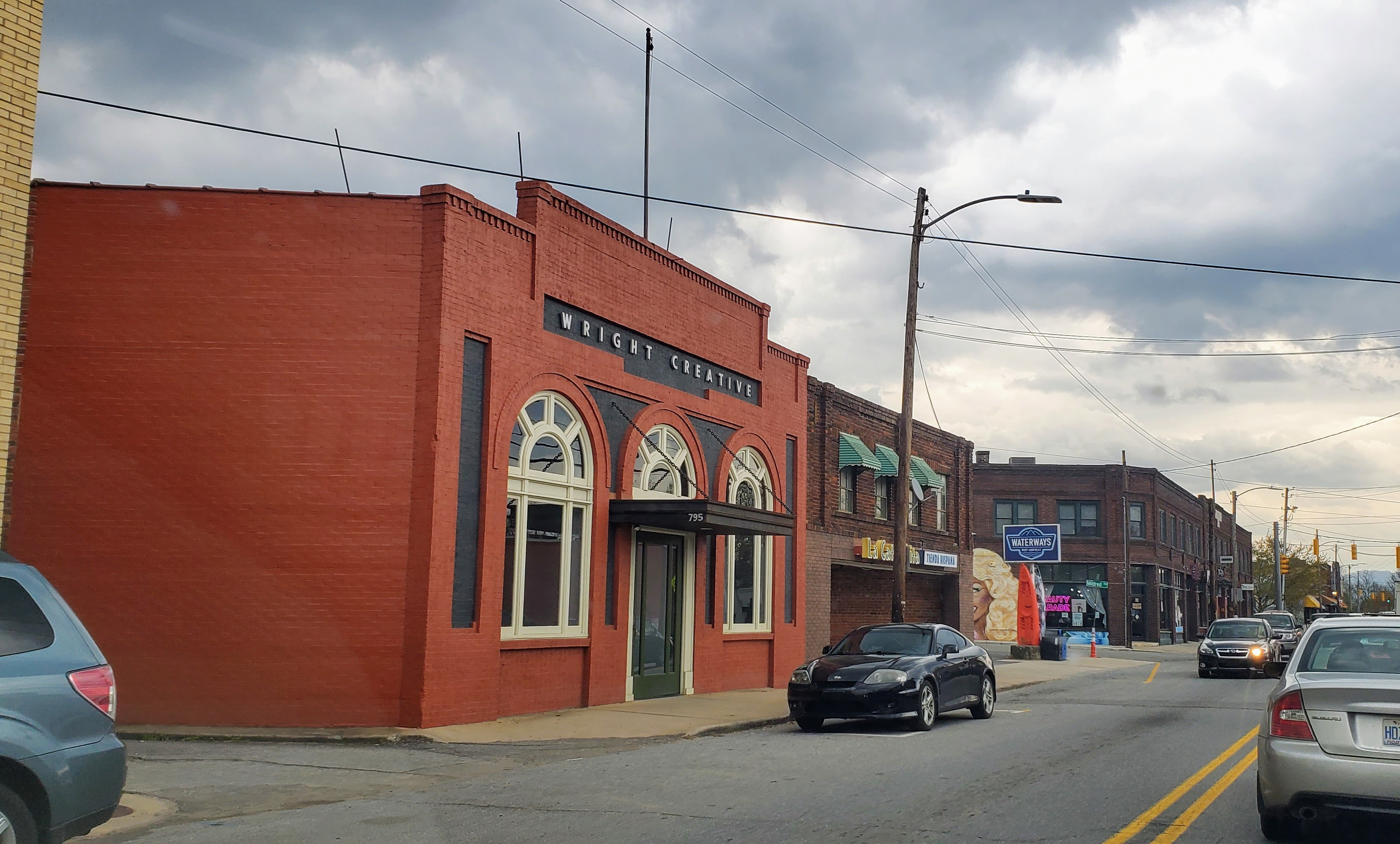
US Post Office & Palace Theater, 2021

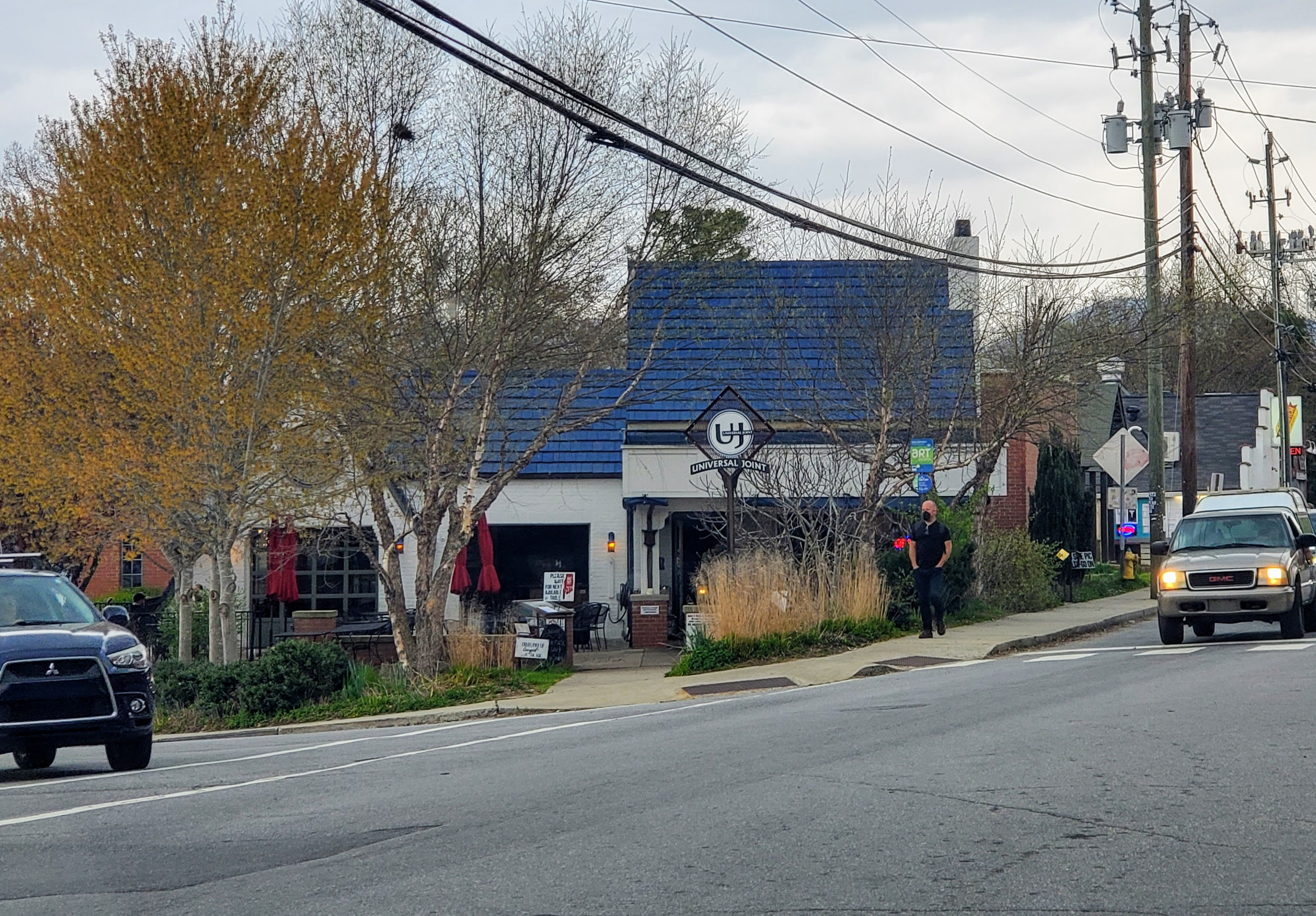
Pure Oil Station, 2021
