= Bledsoe Building =

Historic building in North Carolina, US

- U.S. National Register of Historic Places
- U.S. Historic district – Contributing property
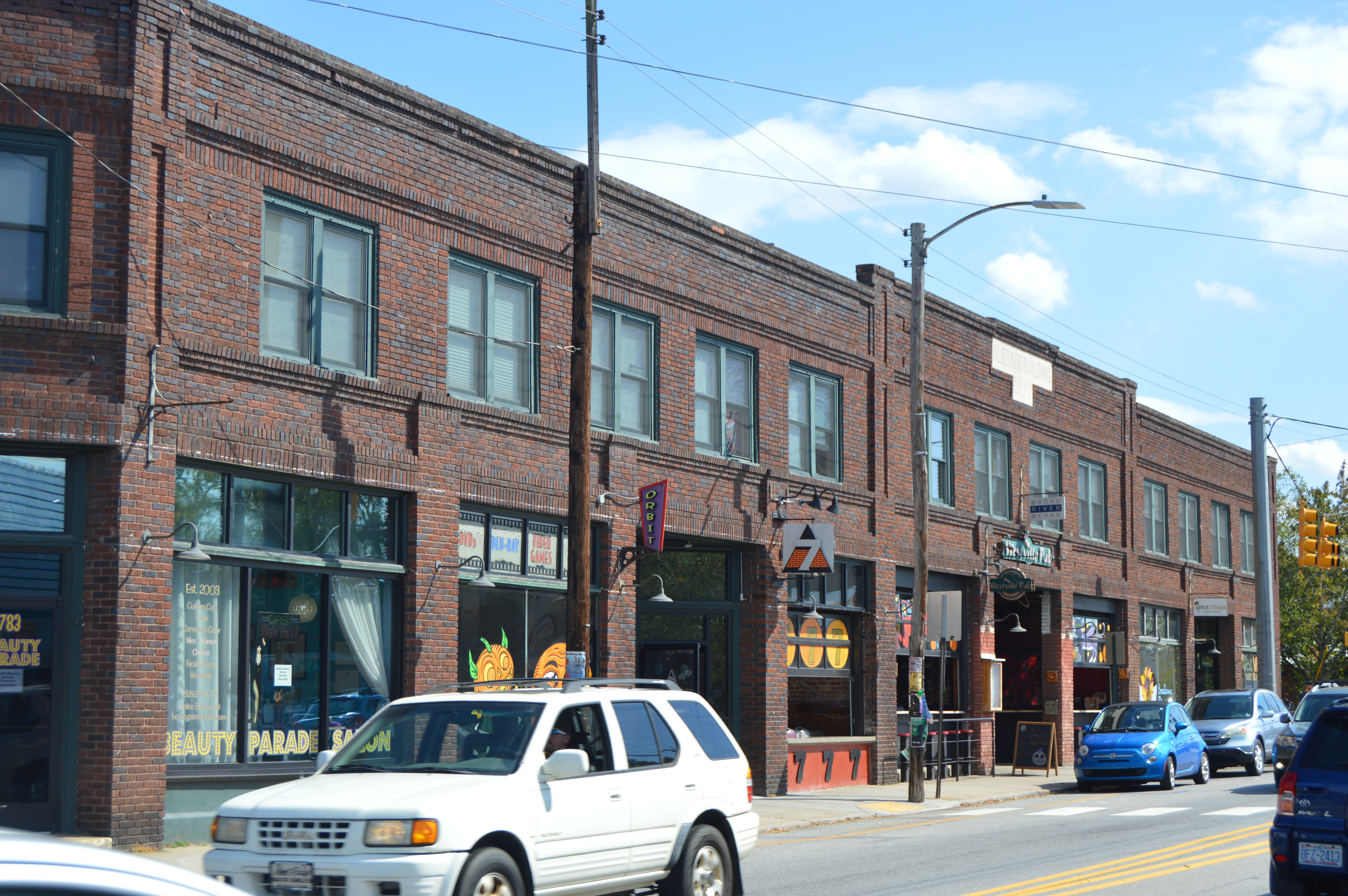
- Facade

- Location within North Carolina Location within the United States
- Location: 771-783 Haywood Rd., Asheville, North Carolina
- Coordinates: 35°34′44″N 82°35′40″W
- Area: 0.7 acres (0.28 ha)
- Built: 1927
- Architectural style: Early Commercial
- NRHP reference No.: 03000267
- Added to NRHP: April 18, 2003

Bledsoe Building is a historic commercial building located at Asheville, Buncombe County, North Carolina. It was built in 1927, and is a two-story, trapezoid-shape brick structure. It consists of three distinct sections; a central portion and flanking east and west wings. The building houses many retail services, offices, and residential rentals rooms.

It was listed on the National Register of Historic Places in 2003. It is located in the West Asheville End of Car Line Historic District.
