= Tar Hollow Trans =

2023 essay collection by Stacy Jane Grover

Tar Hollow Trans: Essays
- Author: Stacy Jane Grover
- Language: English
- Genre: Essay Collection
- Publisher: University Press of Kentucky
- Publication date: June 20, 2023
- Publication place: Lexington
- Pages: 152
- ISBN: 978-0-8131-9755-5

Tar Hollow Trans: Essays is a 2023 essay collection by American author Stacy Jane Grover. It is Grover's debut book and discusses her identity, childhood in Appalachia, and narratives about both. It was a finalist for the 2024 Lambda Literary Award for Transgender Nonfiction and the 2024 Weatherford Award in Nonfiction.

== Essays ==
The collection of nine essays serves as a memoir and reflection on Stacy Jane Grover's experience growing up in Appalachia as a trans writer during the 2000s. Grover grew up in Fairfield County, Ohio, near Columbus. She writes the essays having moved away to the city. She did not label herself as trans or Appalachian as a child, and learned new vocabulary to describe herself with while attending college in Columbus. Grover uses the essays to dissect potential narratives of her own story.

Grover's first writing discuss her quest to see how her geographic background and trans experience influenced each other. She interrogates her identities, wondering whether southeast Ohio really counts as part of Appalachia. In the introduction, she explains that she set out to write a book "exploring my transness through these new-to-me Appalachian cultural traditions and my Appalachian identity through transgender history and theory", but found disappointment in trying to claim these intersectional identitites. She instead wrote essays that aim to honestly "chart my internal process of attempting and failing to rewrite my past to fit into identitites and practices I've never claimed."

"Salt Rising" shares Grover's experiences as a high school goth, discussing the queerness of the goth scene and its difference from LGBT youth subcultures.

"Dead Furrows" recounts Grover's seven-year relationship with her high school sweetheart. The essay examines intimate partner violence and gender.

"The Line Spins Through Time" examines hex signs or barn stars, symbols commonly found in rural areas of her county. She researches the stars, hoping to find inspiration from their history, but learns they are likely a recent trend.

"A Position Which is Nowhere" discusses Grover's childhood experiences with relatives, comparing them to family stories of her ancestors. The essay recounts Grover's comfort while in the kitchen with her aunts as a child, and later experiences of being forced into masculine roles. She shares stories from her great-grandmother, including of Grover's great-aunt Bessie, who defied gender roles and was murdered at 16. Grover discusses the potential of uncertainty and illegibility in stories of her adolescence and Bessie's identity.

== Creation ==
Grover had previously published essays in magazines, but had to learn how to write consistently and produce a book-length manuscript to produce Tar Hollow Trans. While developing a different book in 2021, Grover tweeted about wanting to get a contract for a book on being transgender in Appalachia. Her eventual editor reached out, asking for an official pitch. The book took 14 months to write, and changed from her original idea into an analysis of why she did not quite fit her proposed and expected narratives.

Grover cited Anne Rice, Alison Stine, Carter Sickels, and Kristen Iversen as major influences on her writing career. She also appreciated the writing advice of Carol Bly in Beyond the Writer's Workshop. Many of Grover's essays included detailed research on family history, gender theory, and Appalachian studies, in works she had read several years before writing Tar Hollow Trans.

== Publication ==
Tar Hollow Trans is the first in the Appalachian Futures series by the University of Kentucky Press. The books center Appalachian writers of often-ignored backgrounds, with the press hoping they "will advance a creative ecosystem unrivaled within traditional cultural hubs, creating a space for the voices and stories of Appalachia’s future." Kendra Winchester notes in Book Riot that this series is part of a larger movement to diversify modern Appalachian literature, from publishers like West Virginia University Press and Hub City Press. The editors of Appalachian Futures are Annette Saunooke Clapsaddle, Davis Shoulders, and Crystal Wilkinson.

== Reception ==
Tar Hollow Trans was a finalist for the 2024 Lambda Literary Award for Transgender Nonfiction. It was also a finalist for the 2024 Weatherford Award in Nonfiction.

Several publications saw Tar Hollow Trans as an important part of a wave of creative nonfiction books about diverse Appalachian experiences. These works were explicitly positioned as a response to a dominant narrative about Appalachia that arose from J. D. Vance's popular and controversial memoir, Hillbilly Elegy.

Letitita Montgomery-Rodgers, reviewing Tar Hollow Trans for Foreword, said that the book started slowly and dwelt on complex and uncertain narratives for the sake of authenticity, making "the ordinary nowhere of Grover’s experiences into a place worthy of habitation." Publishers Weekly found the essays compelling and unique, saying that the prose could sometimes be heavy and academic, but the research uncovers Appalachian culture and Grover's personal writing is accessible. L. Brinks, reviewing for The Progressive, found the book's research and reflection to be heavy topics worth dwelling on. Brinks praised Grover's descriptions of place and insistence on writing her own authentic narratives. Similarly, Travis A. Rountree, reviewing for Still: The Journal, praised Grover's research, theory, and personal narratives as a groundbreaking approach to Appalachian Studies and trans theory. Nicole Yurcaba, for Southern Review of Books, also found the work to be new and necessary.

== See also ==
- Country Queers: A Love Letter
- Both/And: Essays by Trans and Gender-Nonconforming Writers of Color
- Uncanny Valley Girls
- And the Dragons Do Come
- When the Harvest Comes
