= Raquel Willis =

American writer and transgender rights activist

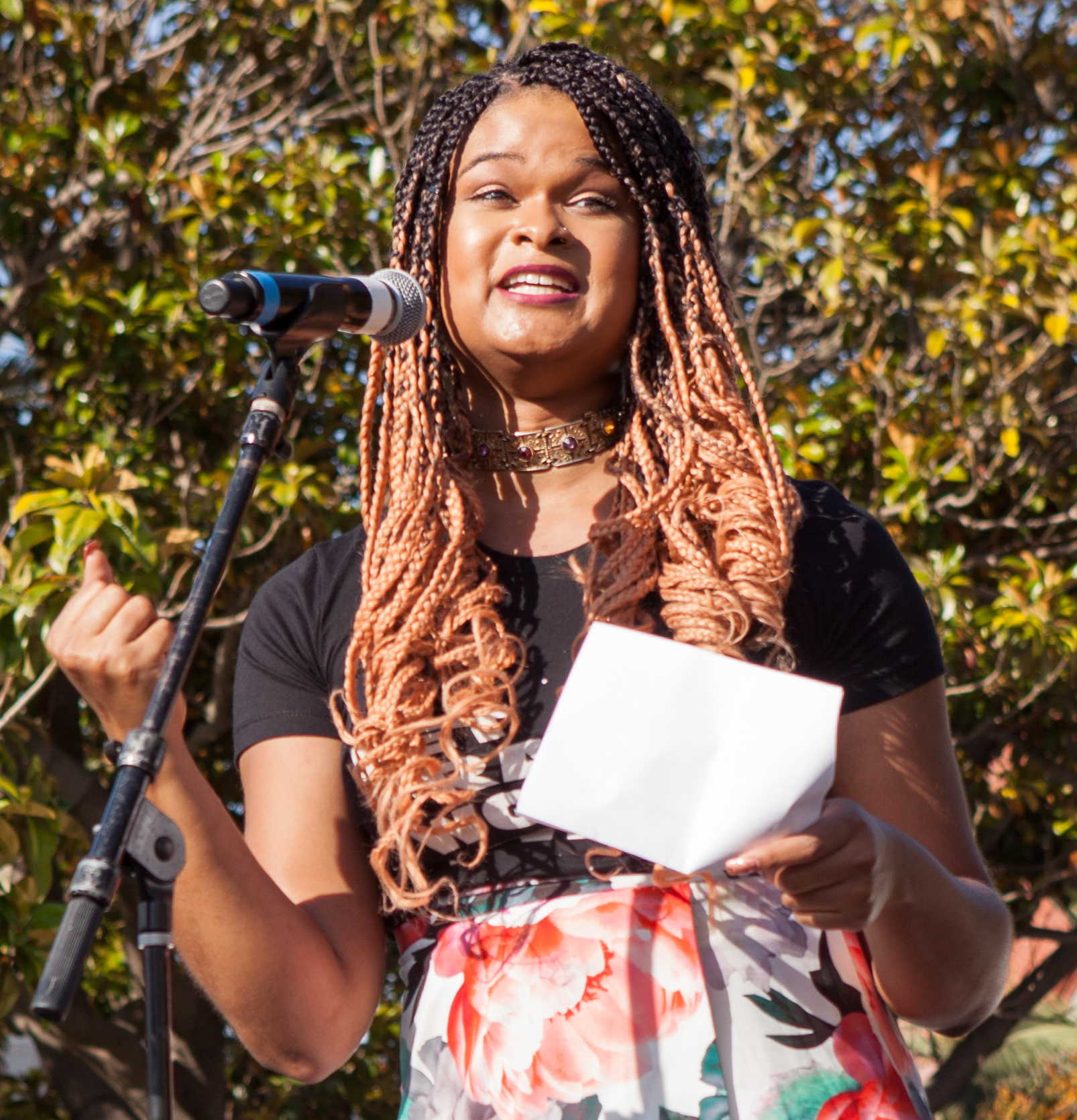
- Willis in 2017
- Born: 1990 or 1991 (age 34–35); Augusta, Georgia, U.S.
- Education: University of Georgia (BA)
- Organization: Ms. Foundation for Women
- Website: Official website

Raquel Willis (born 1990/1991) is an African American writer, editor, and transgender rights activist. She is a former national organizer for the Transgender Law Center and the former executive editor of Out magazine. Her memoir, The Risk It Takes To Bloom, was published in November 2023.

In 2020, Willis won the GLAAD Media Award for Outstanding Magazine Article. In 2025, TIME Magazine named Willis as a Woman of the Year, and as one of the 100 most influential people of the year.

== Early life and education ==
Willis was born and raised in Augusta, Georgia. She grew up in a Catholic family that encouraged volunteerism, stewardship, and giving back to the community. Her parents were both Sunday school teachers, and she attended mass every weekend.

As a child, Willis "was very conflicted" over her gender and sexuality. She was bullied at school and by kids in the neighborhood. As a teenager, she came out as gay, and eventually found acceptance from her peers and parents.

Willis attended college at the University of Georgia, where she encountered more harassment for being gender non-conforming. She came to realize that she was a trans woman, and decided to transition. She worked with other students to counter discrimination based on gender identity. Willis graduated in 2013 with a bachelor's degree in journalism.

== Activism and career ==
Following graduation from UGA, Willis moved to Atlanta and began getting involved in activism with fellow transgender and gender non-conforming people of color. She later came to live in Oakland and work as a communications associate, then national organizer, for the Transgender Law Center.

Willis was one of the speakers at the 2017 Women's March in Washington, D.C. She later stated that though she was glad to be there, she felt that trans women were an "afterthought in the initial planning", and she was cut off by organizers when she tried to say this at the demonstration itself.

Willis has spoken out strongly on behalf of trans women. For example, she has criticized comments by Chimamanda Ngozi Adichie, when Adichie differentiated transgender women from cisgender women. Willis called for a boycott of The Breakfast Club radio show after comedian Lil Duval's appearance on the show, during which he joked about killing trans women after discussing the show's previous interviewee, writer Janet Mock, a transgender woman.

In December 2018, Willis was appointed as executive editor of Out magazine, becoming the first trans woman to lead the publication. Willis, along with Neal Broverman, endorsed Elizabeth Warren in the 2020 Democratic Party presidential primaries. Later that year in June 2020, Willis was announced as the new Director of Communications for the Ms. Foundation for Women. She held that role until January 2021.

Willis co-founded the collective Gender Liberation Movement (GLM) in early 2023. GLM organized the Gender Liberation March in Washington D.C. in support of reproductive and transgender rights amidst anti-LGBTQ legislation and the recent overturning of the constitutional right to have an abortion afforded by Roe v. Wade.

During the Gaza war, Willis attended an anti-war protest and told AP in 2024 that "everyone is thinking about the genocide that is happening in Gaza and Palestine". In 2024, Willis was a grand marshal for the NYC Pride March.

In December 2024, Willis and other GLM activists, among others, stood outside the Supreme Court during the oral arguments for United States v. Skrmetti, focused on gender-affirming care for minors under 18 years old. Later that week, she was one of 15 activists arrested at a bathroom sit-in at the U.S. Capitol that protested the anti-transgender bathroom bill in the U.S. House of Representatives.

In February 2026, Willis and 24 other protesters were arrested at a demonstration outside the Department of Health and Human Services. The protest, led by the Gender Liberation Movement, was in support of gender-affirming care for trans youth.

== Writing ==
Willis' writings have appeared in publications including The Huffington Post, BuzzFeed, and Autostraddle. She also hosted The BGD Podcast with Raquel Willis.

Willis' memoir, The Risk It Takes To Bloom, was published in November 2023 by St. Martin's. Willis named Maya Angelou, Toni Morrison, Janet Mock, The Lady Chablis, bell hooks, Patricia Hill Collins, Barbara Smith, Julia Serano, and Susan Stryker as some of her influences.

In 2025, Willis contributed "All Power to the People" to the anthology Both/And: Essays by Trans and Gender-Nonconforming Writers of Color. The collection was edited by Denne Michele Norris with Electric Literature, and it became a finalist for the 2026 Lambda Literary Award for Transgender Nonfiction.

== Work ==
- 2017 — Sojourner Truth Transformational Leadership Fellow
- 2018 — Jack Jones Literary Arts Sylvia Rivera Fellow
- 2018 — Open Society Foundations Soros Equality Fellow
- 2019 — The Trans Obituaries Project

== Awards and recognition ==
- 2017 — Essence Woke 100 Women
- 2017 — The Root 100 Most Influential African Americans
- 2018 — San Francisco Transgender Day of Visibility Emerging Leader Award
- 2018 — Frederick Douglass 200 awardee
- 2020 — GLAAD Media Award for Outstanding Magazine Article
- 2021 — Fast Company Queer 50
- 2025 — TIME Woman of the Year
- 2025 — TIME 100 Most Influential People of 2025
