= Country Queers: A Love Letter =

2024 book by Rae Garringer

- Author: Rae Garringer
- Publisher: Haymarket Books
- Publication date: October 8, 2024
- Pages: 208
- ISBN: 979-8-888-90248-6

Country Queers: A Love Letter is a 2024 nonfiction book by Rae Garringer. It was a 2025 Stonewall Honor Book in Non-Fiction.

== Background ==
In 2013, Rae Garringer began the Country Queers project, traveling the rural American South and Appalachia to interview LGBTQ people about their lives. Garringer crowdfunded a road trip in 2014, and they spent the next eleven years recording more than 90 oral histories, sharing them via a podcast under the same name. Since the beginning of these interviews, they had envisioned publishing a book to share people's stories.

== Contents ==
Country Queers: A Love Letter contains over 90 interviews with LGBTQ adults recorded as part of Rae Garringer's Country Queers oral history project. The interviewees live in rural places around the U.S., but mostly in Appalachia or the South. The book includes their interview transcripts with additional commentary by Garringer, as well as photography and art. Some of its focuses include community, place, survival, joy, oppression, representation, and the impact of the AIDS pandemic.

The book also documents Garringer's work to create and grow the Country Queers project. It explains their process of finding interviews, a period of feeling overwhelmed by trying to sustain the project alone, and how the project continued through the COVID-19 pandemic.

== Publication ==
Country Queers: A Love Letter was published by Haymarket Books on August 2, 2024.

== Reception ==
Country Queers: A Love Letter was a 2025 Stonewall Honor Book in Non-Fiction.

Multiple reviewers said that the book's subtitle, A Love Letter, was an apt description for how the book shared stories of queer lives in the country. Kirkus Reviews concluded it was an "uplifting, hand-threaded quilt of lives", noting how each story had the power to emotionally connect with readers. Allison Quinlan, for Sinister Wisdom, noted the book's loving presentation of many different aspects of community and life for queer people living in rural America. Quinlan praised the way the work shares a "holistic view of queer country life, gracefully balancing stories of joy, community, and love with harsher realities of oppression, isolation, and loss". Laura Sackton, for Book Riot, called Garringer's commentary "warm, funny, thoughtful, caring, and overflowing with love for the complicated, contradictory, joyful, celebratory, and difficult lives of rural queers." In an article for the Journal of Appalachian Health, Bradley A. Firchow wrote about the book's use for understanding rural queer healthcare experiences and needs for people working in public health.

== See also ==
- Black. Queer. Southern. Women.
- Tar Hollow Trans
- Uncanny Valley Girls
- A Visitation of Spirits
- Dream Boy
- When the Harvest Comes
