= Pretending to be Normal =

Book by Liane Holliday Willey

Pretending to Be Normal: Living with Asperger's Syndrome
- Author: Liane Holliday Willey
- Language: English
- Publisher: Jessica Kingsley Publishers
- Publication date: 1999

Pretending to Be Normal: Living with Asperger's Syndrome is a book written by Liane Holliday Willey, published by Jessica Kingsley Publishers, that offers insight into the experience of living with Asperger's syndrome, a neurodevelopmental disorder characterized by difficulties with social interaction and communication, as well as repetitive behaviors and interests. The book was first published in 1999 and has since been updated, in 2014, with an additional 15 years of reflection by the author on living with Asperger's syndrome.

== Overview ==
Asperger's syndrome is a form of autism that is characterized by difficulties with social interaction and communication, as well as repetitive behaviors and interests. It is often referred to as "high-functioning autism", as many people with Asperger's syndrome have average or above-average intelligence. However, they may have challenges with physical coordination, behavioral eccentricities, and language peculiarities.

Willey was diagnosed with Asperger's syndrome as an adult, after experiencing difficulties with social interactions and understanding the "normal" world throughout her life. In her book, she shares her personal story and offers advice and resources for others living with Asperger's syndrome.

Pretending to Be Normal: Living with Asperger's Syndrome is an autobiographical account of the author's experience growing up with undiagnosed Asperger's syndrome. The book offers descriptions of the challenges and difficulties that Willey faced and the strategies she used to survive and eventually thrive. The book also includes a series of appendices with advice and resources for people with Asperger's syndrome and their families, including information on explaining the condition to others, adapting to various situations, and coping strategies.

== Reception ==
Pretending to Be Normal: Living with Asperger's Syndrome has received generally positive reviews for its informative content. The book has also been used as a reference for several studies and papers on Asperger's syndrome.
