= Liane Holliday Willey =

American writer

- Occupation: Writer
- Notable work: Pretending to be Normal

Liane Holliday Willey is an American writer, researcher and advocate for people with Asperger syndrome. She has written several books on Asperger's, including Pretending to be Normal: Living with Asperger's Syndrome and Asperger Syndrome in the Family: Redefining Normal.

== Education and career ==
Willey holds a doctorate in education, specializing in the fields of psycholinguistics and learning style differences. She is the senior editor of Autism Spectrum Quarterly and a speaker on the subject of Asperger syndrome.

=== Diagnosis and advocacy ===
Willey was diagnosed with Asperger syndrome at the age of 35, in 1999. Since her diagnosis, she has focused her academic research on women with Asperger's and on communication skills for people on the autism spectrum. She has also used her personal experiences with Asperger syndrome to advocate for better understanding and acceptance within the community.

=== Writing ===
Willey coined the term "aspie" in 1999 to refer to people with Asperger syndrome. She is the author of several books on Asperger syndrome, including Pretending to be Normal: Living with Asperger's Syndrome, Asperger Syndrome in Adolescence: Living with the Ups, the Downs, and Things in Between, Asperger Syndrome in the Family: Redefining Normal, and Safety Skills for Asperger Women: How to Save a Perfectly Good Female Life. These books offer insight and guidance for those with Asperger syndrome and their families. She also wrote the foreword for Rudy Simone's book Aspergirls, which was republished by the Journal of Autism and Developmental Disorders.

== Personal life ==
Willey is married with three daughters.
