= Transgender youth =

Children and adolescents who are transgender

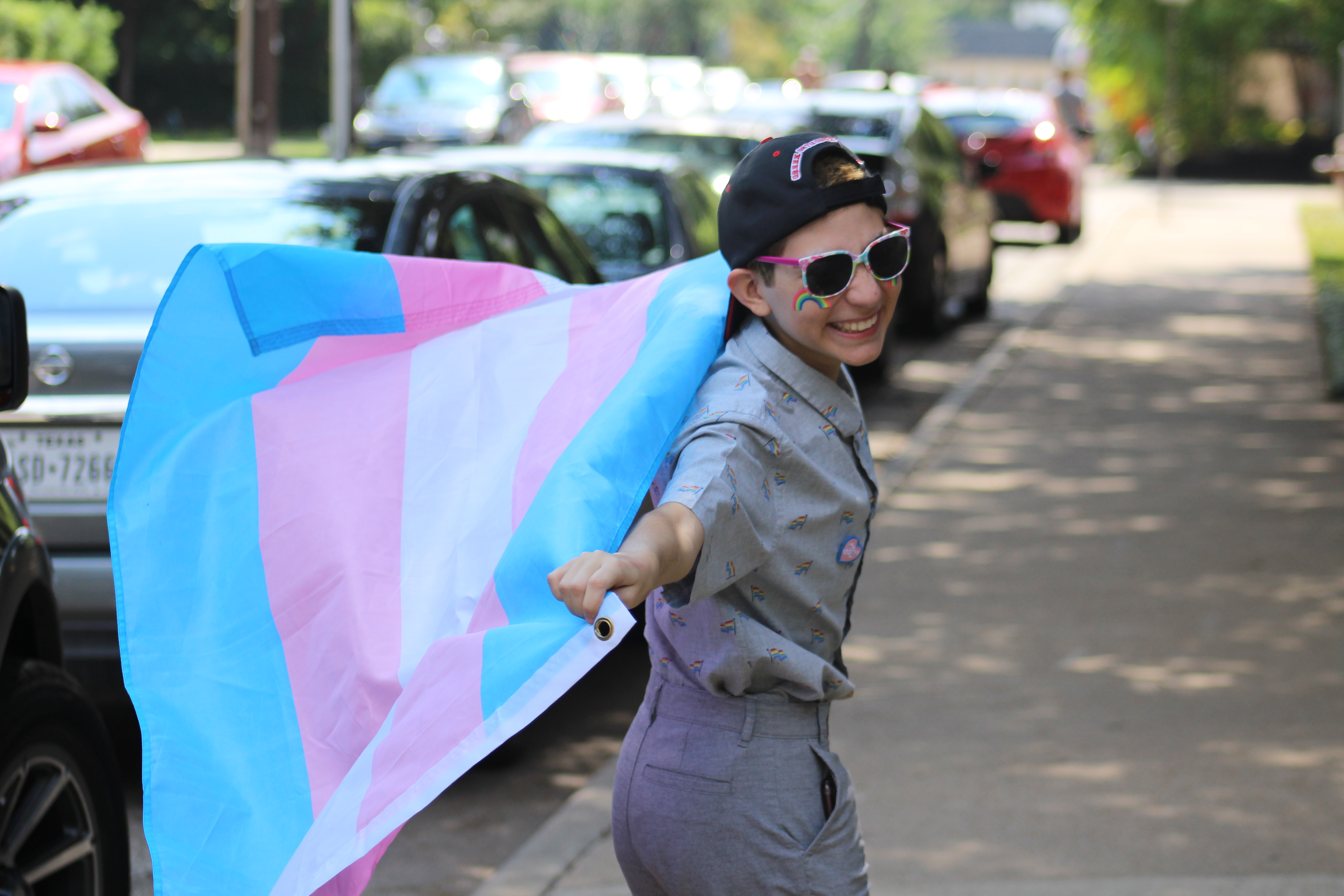
A trans boy holding a trans pride flag

Transgender youth are children or adolescents who do not identify with the gender associated with the sex they were assigned at birth. Because transgender youth usually depend on their parents for care, shelter, financial support, and other needs, they face different challenges than transgender adults. According to the World Professional Association for Transgender Health, the American Psychological Association, and the American Academy of Pediatrics, appropriate care for transgender youth may include supportive mental health care, social transition, and/or puberty blockers, which delay puberty and the development of secondary sex characteristics to allow children more time to explore their gender identity.

According to the American Academy of Pediatrics, most children have a stable sense of their gender identity by age four, and research substantiates that children who are prepubertal and assert a transgender or gender-diverse identity know their gender as clearly and consistently as their developmentally equivalent peers who identify as cisgender and benefit from the same level of social acceptance. A 2022 review found that most pre-pubertal children who socially transition persist in their identity in 5- to 7-year follow-ups. Gender dysphoria is likely to be permanent if it persists during puberty.

== Coming out ==
Transgender youth may experience family exclusion and discrimination. Some transgender youth choose to remain closeted until they determine it is safe and appropriate to disclose their gender identity to family members and friends. In the LGBTQ community, "coming out" refers to the process of acknowledging and publicly sharing one's sexual identity or gender identity.

=== Family acceptance ===
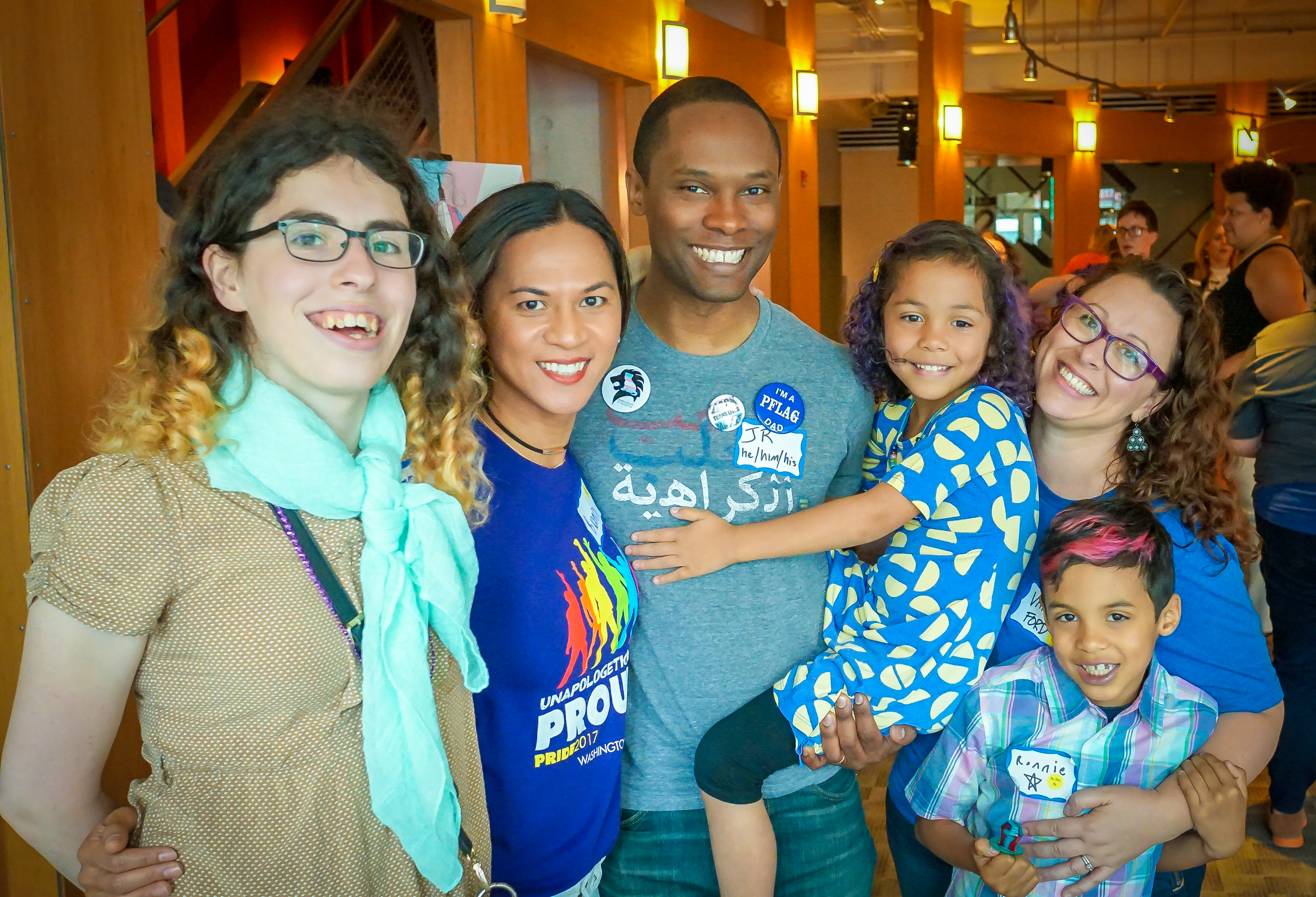
A transgender girl (center right) with her family at a Capital Pride event.

Family acceptance, or lack thereof, significantly impacts the lives of transgender youth. Predicting a parent's reaction to their child's gender identity can be difficult, and the coming-out process may be challenging for many transgender youths. In some cases, parents may react negatively, which can include disowning the child or forcing them to leave the home. Research suggests that transgender youth involved in the juvenile justice system are more likely to have experienced family rejection, abuse, and abandonment compared to cisgender youth. Because transgender youth depend on their parents for support and acceptance, family exclusion can contribute to emotional vulnerability for transgender youth, and some may regret coming out as a result.

Parents can seek gender-affirmative counselors and doctors and connect their children with LGBTQ support groups. Some parents join organizations such as Mermaids in the United Kingdom and PFLAG in the US to meet other parents and learn how to advocate for their children. Parental reactions to transgender children may change over time, with some parents who initially respond with negativity later offering support.

=== Support ===
Research has consistently shown that familial support and acceptance of transgender youth contribute to more positive outcomes in mental, physical, and emotional health.

Studies have identified various ways in which parents or guardians can support transgender youth, including providing opportunities for open discussions about gender identity. Transgender youth experience greater emotional stability and success when parents take a supportive approach rather than a controlling or dismissive stance. Addressing challenges during the transition process as they arise, rather than imposing views or dictating the process, has been associated with healthier transitions. Additionally, informing professionals and other key individuals in the child's life helps build a support network for transgender youth.

Access to information is an important factor in aiding and advocating for transgender youth. Information allows parents to connect their children with resources related to gender identity, such as medical care, counseling, educational materials, and local youth groups that provide community support.

Support in schools also plays a significant role in the well-being and mental health of transgender youth. Many schools implement policies to support transgender students, and educators can reference trans-inclusive school guidance documents to inform their approaches. Ongoing research continues to explore best practices for transgender inclusion in educational settings.

=== Health risks ===
Family acceptance of transgender youth is associated with higher self-esteem, increased social support, and improved overall health. It also serves as a protective factor against depression, substance abuse, and suicidal ideation and behaviors. Research has indicated that, in carefully selected patients, those who transition at a young age experience few negative effects and maintain a higher level of functioning compared to before transitioning. Additionally, treatment outcomes, such as those from counseling, tend to be more favorable when offered at an earlier age.

Family behaviors play a role in either increasing or decreasing the health risks faced by transgender youth. Negative behaviors, including physical or verbal harassment, pressure to conform to gender roles, and exclusion from family events, are linked to higher risks of depression and suicide. Conversely, supportive behaviors, such as acknowledging and discussing the youth's gender identity and working to support their choices despite potential parental discomfort, contribute to increased confidence and help mitigate the health risks associated with rejection.

== Medical interventions ==
Puberty blockers are sometimes prescribed to trans children who have not yet begun puberty to temporarily halt the development of secondary sex characteristics. Puberty blockers give patients more time to solidify their gender identity before starting puberty. While few studies have examined the effects of puberty blockers for transgender and gender non-conforming adolescents, the studies that have been conducted generally indicate that these treatments are reasonably safe and can improve psychological well-being.

Short-term side effects of puberty blockers include headaches, fatigue, insomnia, muscle aches, and changes in breast tissue, mood, and weight. The potential risks of pubertal suppression in gender dysphoric youth treated with GnRH agonists may include adverse effects on bone mineralization. Additionally, genital tissue in transgender women may not be optimal for potential vaginoplasty later in life due to underdevelopment of the penis. Research on the long-term effects on brain development, cognitive function, fertility, and sexual function is limited. In the Netherlands, youth are allowed to begin taking cross-sex hormones at age 16, following their course of puberty blockers.

Some studies support the ability of children to provide informed consent for puberty blockers, arguing that if parents oppose a child's transition, the child may lack access to medically necessary treatment. Comparisons have been drawn to the legal precedent allowing children of Jehovah's Witnesses to receive blood transfusions despite parental objections. Research highlights the psychological benefits of puberty blockers and the potential psychological and physical harm resulting from lack of access. Transgender minors, particularly homeless transgender youth, who do not have standard access to blockers may seek them from unreliable sources, increasing the risk of dangerous side effects. Transgender youth have voiced support for their right to access puberty blockers.

In Bell v Tavistock, the High Court of Justice of England and Wales ruled that it was unlikely that a child under the age of 16 could be Gillick competent to consent to puberty-blocking treatment. This was overturned by the Court of Appeal, which ruled that children under 16 could consent to receiving puberty blockers.

For those who are over 18 and do not require parental consent, there are several medical interventions available. For those wishing to transition from male to female, options consist of facial feminization surgery, vaginoplasty, breast augmentation surgery, and cross-sex hormones. For those wishing to transition from female to male, options consist of penile construction surgery, breast reduction surgery, and cross-sex hormones. Under American Psychiatric Association criteria, in order for any individual to receive these medical treatments, they must have a written diagnosis of gender dysphoria and have undergone up to a year's worth of therapy. Citizens of Malta can change their gender marker through a relatively simple paperwork process. In the United States, changing a gender marker typically requires medical documentation and may require individuals to return to their home state to obtain various legal documents. To update an existing gender marker and name, applications can be submitted for driver's licenses and banking documents.

In February 2024, the American Psychological Association approved a policy statement supporting unobstructed access to health care and evidence-based clinical care for trans, gender-diverse, and nonbinary children, adolescents, and adults. The statement also opposes state bans and policies intended to limit access to such care.

The British Cass Review, which examined gender services for trans youth in the United Kingdom, stated in its systematic review of the literature that "the quality of the studies was not good enough to draw any firm conclusions, so all results should be interpreted with caution". However, other countries, including the United States, France, Canada, Australia, Germany, Switzerlands, Austria, and Japan, have disagreed with this conclusion through statements from relevant medical organizations, systematic reviews of their own, or subsequently released medical guidelines.

In May 2025, a two year systematic review commissioned by the state of Utah as part of a ban on trans youth healthcare concluded that "The consensus of the evidence supports that the treatments are effective in terms of mental health, psychosocial outcomes, and the induction of body changes consistent with the affirmed gender in pediatric [gender dysphoria] patients. The evidence also supports that the treatments are safe in terms of changes to bone density, cardiovascular risk factors, metabolic changes, and cancer". The review's findings were thereafter dismissed by the Utah state legislature, who kept the ban in place.

In May 2026, Texas Attorney General Ken Paxton announced a settlement with Texas Children's Hospital requiring the hospital to establish a “detransition clinic” for minors who had received gender-transition-related medical treatment.

== Vulnerability ==
Transgender youth are especially vulnerable to a multitude of risks, including substance use disorders, suicide, childhood abuse, sexual abuse/assault, and psychiatric disorders.

=== Gender dysphoria ===
Gender dysphoria is a strong, persistent discomfort and distress with one's gender, anatomy, sex assigned at birth, and even societal attitudes toward their gender variance. Transgender youth who experience gender dysphoria may become very conscious of their bodies. Treatment of gender dysphoria may include methods of social, physical, and legal transitions. Research has suggested that gender-affirming treatments, including hormone therapy and surgery, are associated with elevated body satisfaction.

=== Physical, sexual, and verbal abuse ===
Transgender and gender nonconforming youth are at increased risk for physical, verbal, and sexual abuse. Childhood gender nonconformity is correlated with abuse. Transgender youth who face physical abuse may be forced to leave their homes or need to leave due to safety issues. A lack of support at home and constant harassment at school may lead to academic difficulties for the youth as well, who face a much higher dropout rate compared to their cisgender counterparts.

=== Homelessness and survival sex ===
In the U.S., according to the National Healthcare for the Homeless Council, one fifth of LGBTQ+ youth have unstable housing or lack housing altogether as of 2014. It is estimated that between 20% and 40% of homeless youth identify as LGBTQ+. Reasons for home insecurity among LGBTQ+ youth include family rejection and conflict, domestic violence, and difficulty within various institutions such as school or the foster care system. LGBTQ+ youth who find themselves in homeless shelters may not have their needs met. They may be denied access to the shelter due to their gender identity or be inappropriately housed somewhere that does not align with their identity.

Homelessness among LGBTQ+ youth may lead to survival sex, the act of engaging in sex work in order to fulfill one's basic needs. One study in Minneapolis found that about one in four homeless and runaway youth has engaged in survival sex. Risks associated with survival sex include the transmission of STI/STDs (sexually transmitted infection/disease), as well as sexual assault and other forms of abuse.

=== Medical inequality ===
Transgender youth can face difficulty obtaining medical treatment for their gender dysphoria. This lack of access is often due to doctors refusing to treat youth or youth fearing negative reactions from health care providers. Psychiatrists, endocrinologists, and family physicians now have clear guidelines on how to provide care to trans youth from early puberty through its completion.

The transgender population is at increased risk for STI transmission compared to the general population.

=== Hostile educational environment ===
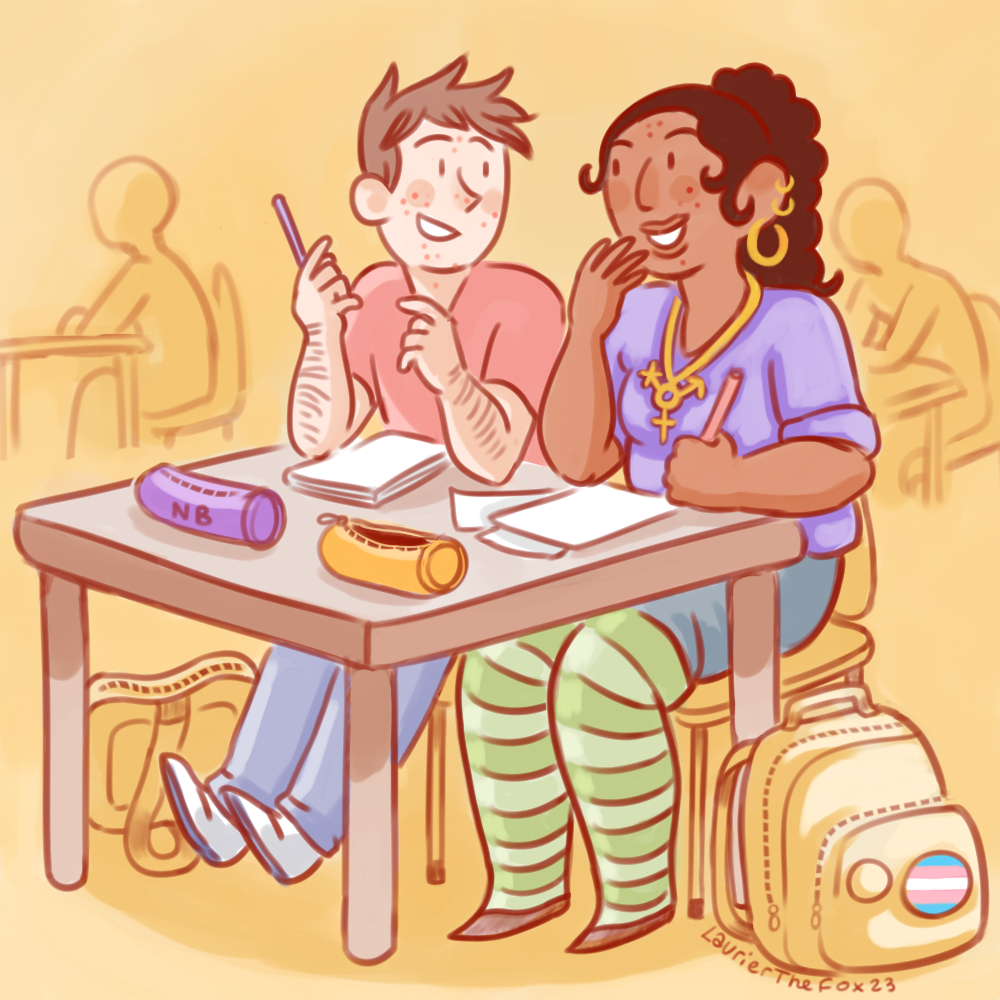
An illustration of two transgender students in high school

School settings can be places of bullying for transgender youth. Several problems may be faced at schools, including verbal and physical harassment and assault, sexual harassment, social exclusion and isolation, and other interpersonal problems with peers. A 2021 report found that most transgender students in the US had experienced harassment and felt unsafe in school settings. These experiences vary between individuals and schools attended. Larger schools tend to have safer climates for transgender students, as do schools with more low-income and religious and ethnic minorities.

A 2019 study of 6th through 12th grade transgender students in the United States showed that most experienced a hostile school climate with regular victimization and harassment from peers. 82% of these youth reported that they felt unsafe at school because of their gender identity, and almost 90% reported experiencing homophobic harassment from peers frequently. A majority of these students also reported physical harassment at school, with nearly half reporting that they had been punched, kicked, or injured with a weapon. Sexual harassment among these students was also reported with alarming frequency (76%). Restrooms and locker rooms pose an especially high threat to transgender students, who frequently report fear and anxiety about using these facilities at school because of experiences of harassment by both peers and adults when using them. Negative comments about gender presentation may be frequently overheard in these places, and surveyed students have reported being "pushed around", "getting the crap beat out of them", and "getting their asses kicked" by peers. A 2017 study of U.S. students in grades 9–12 found that 27% of transgender students reported feeling unsafe at school, a sharp contrast with only 5% of cisgender boys and 7% of cisgender girls who reported similar feelings.

School administrations may not take reports of victimization of transgender students seriously. Only a third of transgender students who reported victimization to school staff feel that their situation was taken care of adequately and effectively.

In one study of transgender youth, three-quarters of the participants dropped out of school, almost all citing the main reason for the constant acts of violence against them due to their gender identity. Anti-transgender bullying in schools has also been found to directly correlate with other negative outcomes, such as homelessness, unemployment, incarceration, and drug use.

A national survey conducted by GLSEN found that 75% of transgender youth feel unsafe at school, and those who are able to persevere have significantly lower GPAs and are more likely to miss school out of concern for their safety. These students also reported being less likely to plan on continuing their education.

=== Suicide ===
A 2007 study of transgender youth found that, of the youth interviewed, about half had seriously contemplated ending their own lives. Of those who had thought about suicide, about half had actually made an attempt. Overall, 18% of all interviewed transgender teenagers reported an attempted suicide that was linked to their transgender identity. In a 2014 study, it was found that these statistics are even higher for those who became homeless because of bias against their gender identity or have been denied medical care because they were transgender. This brings the numbers up to 69% for those who were made homeless because of gender identity and 60% for those denied medical care because they were transgender, with a general statistic stating that around 40% of transgender youth have attempted suicide. In the 2011 National Transgender Discrimination Survey, which surveyed 6,450 transgender individuals, 41% of respondents reported attempting suicide compared to 1.6% of the general population (a rate 25 times more elevated). Reported rates of attempted suicide were even higher for those who were unemployed, experienced harassment and physical or sexual abuse, or had low household income. However, a study on the impact of parental support on trans youth found that among trans children with supportive parents, only 4% attempted suicide, a 93% decrease.

Transgender youth may face victimization from peers and family members' negative reactions to their atypical gender presentation, increasing their risk of life-threatening behaviors.

Numerous studies across various countries have noted suicide attempt rates for transgender children ranging from 30 to 50%, at least double the rates of age-matched cisgender peers.

A 2022 study of American transgender youth, aged 13–20, found that those who received gender-affirming hormones (GAH) and/or puberty blockers had 73% lower odds of self-harm or suicidal ideation compared to those who had never received either. The participants were studied over a period of one year. A separate 2022 study of American transgender adults found that receiving GAH at an earlier age was correlated with lower suicidal ideation and psychological distress. Those who accessed GAH as early adolescents (age) were 135% less likely to report suicidal ideation in the year leading up to the study than those who had never accessed GAH. Those transgender adults who accessed GAH as late adolescents were 62% less likely to report suicidal ideation. Those who accessed GAH as adults were 21% less likely to report suicidal ideation.

A multi-year study published in September 2024 found that the restriction to transgender care after passing of anti-trans laws in several US states, including restriction on access to gender-affirming puberty blockers, showed a direct link to negative mental health outcomes for transgender youth. The study followed the enactment of several laws in US states on restricting such access, which led to an increase of suicide attempts of 7-72% in transgender youth within one to two years following the enactment of laws restricting access.

=== Discrimination in court ===
Individuals involved in the juvenile justice system have reported that transgender youth have an exceptionally difficult experience. This is because, for a transgender youth, a sentence to a juvenile detention facility could mean that transition is stopped while they are detained.

Juvenile justice professionals are bound by the rules of ethics to ensure all youth are treated fairly. However, in 2015, out of 183 transgender youth, 44 percent described interactions with the courts as negative and felt as if they were not adequately represented or respected in court. This included treatment from prosecutors, court-appointed defense attorneys, and judges, including one case in which a judge refused to hear the case of a transgender girl due to the way she was dressed. In another case, a prosecutor requested confinement for a transgender defendant rather than being returned home. The judge agreed to the confinement, even though the defendant was not an apparent danger or flight risk.

=== Detention centers ===
In a 2009 survey, some juvenile detention centers stated that they already had difficulties housing girls and boys on the same campus and that mixing transgender youth according to their identified gender in one dormitory would only create more problems. Transgender boys are harder to place because of the high level of violence in the boys' facilities and the high risk of sexual assault.

As a result of these difficulties, transgender youth are frequently placed in solitary confinement. The centers assert that the solitary confinement is for their safety because the facilities cannot keep them protected if they are mixed in with the general population. However, confinement strips them of any recreational and educational programming that is imperative to maintaining mental stability. Oftentimes, these isolations are based on the belief that LGBTQ youth are sexual predators and should not be around other confined youth or with individuals of the opposite gender. One transgender youth in New York was placed in isolation for three weeks, despite her request to be placed in the general population. Following her isolation, she was placed in observation for three months, whereas others are only in observation for one week.

Additionally, the safety of detention facilities is a primary issue, as reported by LGBT youth in detention centers and individuals who work in the juvenile justice system. Transgender youth are at risk for abuse from both staff and other youth in the center. This can include staff abusing the youth or ignoring incidents of rape and abuse. Youth who were interviewed stated that they feared for their safety, and complaints about abuse went unheard and unresolved.

Staff members in juvenile detention centers are not properly trained in order to deal with some of the issues faced by transgender youth, such as the use of proper pronouns or adequate clothing choices. This can be due to the varying amount of comfort around the issue of transgender youth and sexual identification, which has an impact on the treatment the youth receive. For example, one transgender girl stated that she did not have problems with the boys in her detention center, but she did with the staff. She said the staff would call her "him" and "he," even though she identified as female, and they refused to accept her transition from male to female.

== Societal and legal attitudes ==
On a global scale, transgender individuals face varying levels of acceptance or denial based on their location's attitude towards the LGBT community. Factors that influence acceptance or denial of their identity tend to surround political interests, religious affiliations, and whether their identity is still labeled as a mental health disorder. Acceptance levels tend to be predominantly higher in countries located in the Global North. Despite higher levels, acceptance rates still vary from country to country. Malta and the United States of America are two examples of countries where legislation and social acceptance levels have curated a safer environment for transgender individuals.

=== Malta ===
In early April 2015, Malta adopted a bill titled the "Gender Identity, Gender Expression and Sex Characteristics Act" (GIGESC Bill). The bill allows minors to have their parents apply to have their legal gender marker changed for them or to have a gender marker held from their birth certificate until their gender identity has been self-determined. The bill also prevents surgeries from being performed on intersex infants until their gender identity has been discovered; the parents are no longer required to make an immediate decision, and medical personnel cannot override this decision because the bill also outlaws the request to view medical records. For individuals who are no longer minors, they only need to request a notary for self-declaration; again, the individual cannot be asked for medical records when changing their legal gender or performing any other legal changes in conjunction with their gender identity. Also, the entire process can be completed in less than thirty days.

=== Other European countries ===
While there are other European countries that have created allowances and encouraged acceptance of transgender individuals, some require compulsory sterilization and have lengthy legal proceedings.

=== Mexico ===
In Mexico City, transgender teenagers over the age of 12 may change their legal gender as of 27 August 2021. In Jalisco, following a decree on 29 October 2020, trans children and teenagers from all Mexican states were able to change their legal gender with parental consent, but since the implementation of new legislation in April 2022, recognition of transgender identities has been limited to people over the age of 18. In Oaxaca State, transgender teenagers over the age of 12 may change their legal gender as of October 2021.

=== United States ===
In the United States, discrimination is deemed illegal. This was affirmed by the US Supreme Court's decision to extend protections to LGBT workers on 15 June 2020. Many transgender youth face struggles in attempting to transition and to be accepted in the U.S. According to the Human Rights Campaign, as of 2015, in 32 states, an individual can be fired for being transgender, and in 33 states, an individual can be refused housing. Transgender people are also disproportionately targeted for hate crimes. One report studying data from 1995 to 1999 found that 20% of transgender people who were murdered were victims of anti-transgender hate crimes. Anti-transgender violence also caused 40% of police reports by the transgender population. In 2013, the state of California signed a bill into law titled the School Success and Opportunity Act, giving transgender students the full rights and opportunities that their cisgender peers are granted. For individuals who are minors, if their parents consent, they are able to begin receiving puberty blockers at a young age and later receive cross-sex hormones and then transitional surgeries upon turning 18 years of age. For those who are not minors, they are able to participate in any body-altering transitional experience that they desire if they are able to financially afford it and after going through a year of therapy to affirm this decision, but they will have to jump over several hurdles for it to also be legally marked. The western and northeastern states are currently the most tolerant of the transgender population and have the most laws to protect those individuals.

During the first four months of 2021, there was a wave of legislation aiming to restrict access to gender-affirming healthcare treatments for transgender youth, as 28 Republican-controlled state legislatures have drafted or passed a number of bills of this sort. In April, Arkansas passed the Save Adolescents From Experimentation (SAFE) Act, which banned medical treatment and procedures for transgender youth under the age of 18. The law warns health care providers that administering procedures such as puberty-blockers, cross-sex hormone therapy, and gender-affirming surgeries can result in losing their medical license. Colorado, Florida, Illinois, Kentucky, Missouri, Oklahoma, South Carolina, South Dakota, and West Virginia have proposed similar laws that would prevent trans youth from having access to gender-affirming health care. Opponents of the bills criminalizing transition-related treatment for transgender youth are concerned that they prevent doctors from following health care guidelines approved by organizations like the American Medical Association.

On 10 May 2021, the Biden administration announced that it would provide transgender people protection against discrimination in health care in an effort to restore civil rights protections for LGBTQ people that were eliminated by his predecessor. The policy reestablished that the federal government will protect transgender people, once again prohibiting discrimination on the basis of sexual orientation and gender identity by health care providers and health-related organizations that receive federal funding.

Health and Human Services' (HHS) reversal of the Affordable Care Act, Section 1557, was backed up by landmark Supreme Court decision Bostock v. Clayton County (2020) that ruled that LGBTQ individuals are protected against employment discrimination on the basis of their gender identity or sexual orientation. HHS concludes that the Bostock decision applies to health care as well, which led to the revision of the ACA civil rights provision. HHS Secretary Xavier Becerra said in a statement: "The Supreme Court has made clear that people have a right not to be discriminated against on the basis of sex and receive equal treatment under the law, no matter their gender identity or sexual orientation. Fear of discrimination can lead individuals to forgo care, which can have serious negative health consequences."

On 7 April 2022, the Alabama legislature passed HB 322, which bans transgender youth from using sex-segregated school facilities aligning with their gender and prohibits discussion of sexual orientation and gender identity in grades K–5, copying language from a recent Florida bill. A few hours later, they passed SB 184, which criminalizes the provision of gender-affirming medical care for transgender minors, making it a felony punishable by up to 10 years in prison to help or suggest a child's medical or social transition and mandating that school employees report a child's gender identity to their parents. The bill makes exceptions for intersex youth and circumcision. During the debate, its sponsor, Rep. Shay Shelnutt, compared gender-affirming care to vaping or getting a tattoo. The Southern Poverty Law Center, GLBTQ Legal Advocates & Defenders, and the Human Rights Campaign announced plans to challenge the bill on behalf of medical best practices, as supported by most major American medical associations, two medical care providers, and the families who would be harmed by the bill.

== Persistence of transgender identity ==
If a child's gender dysphoria persists during puberty, it is likely permanent. For children with gender dysphoria, the period between 10 and 13 years is crucial with regard to long-term gender identity. Factors that are associated with gender dysphoria persisting through puberty include the intensity of gender dysphoria, the amount of cross-gendered behavior, and verbal identification with the desired or experienced gender (i.e., stating that they are a different gender rather than wish to be a different gender).

A systematic review of research relating to desistance was published in 2022. It found that desistance was poorly defined; studies sometimes did not define it or equally defined the desistance of transgender identity and the desistance of gender dysphoria. They also found that none of the definitions allowed for dynamic or nonbinary gender identities and that the majority of articles published were editorial pieces. They stated the concept was based on biased research from the 1960s to the 1980s and poor-quality research in the 2000s. They concluded there was a "dearth of high-quality hypothesis-driven research that currently exists" on the subject and suggested that desistance should "be removed from clinical and research discourse to focus instead on supporting [transgender and gender-expansive] youth rather than attempting to predict their future gender identity." According to a review published in 2022, considering more recent studies, the majority of pre-pubertal children who socially transition persist in their identity in 5- to 7-year follow-ups.

=== History ===
Historically, prospective studies reported gender dysphoria in children to be more heavily linked to an adult non-transgender queer identity than to an adult transgender identity, especially for children assigned male at birth, with or without therapeutic intervention. These studies have been used to argue for more caution or delays before allowing transgender children to socially or medically transition, but have later been criticized on a number of evidentiary and methodological bases.

These studies have primarily been criticized as irrelevant on the basis that they counted as "desistance" cases where the child was not dysphoric, but rather simply behaved in a manner atypical of their assigned gender. The studies additionally tracked diagnoses rather than gender identity or desire to transition, leading to an inflation of the desistance statistics. The majority of desistance research relies on four studies published since 2008. While the subjects met the criteria for gender identity disorder as defined in the DSM-III or DSM-IV, many would not have met the updated criteria for gender dysphoria in the DSM-5, established in 2013, which, unlike prior versions, explicitly requires identification with a gender other than that assigned at birth. In one study, 40% of those classified as "desisters" were subthreshold even for the DSM-IV criteria.

The four studies all offered evidence that the statement of transgender identity in childhood predicted transgender identity in adolescence and adulthood, and the intensity of gender dysphoria in childhood likewise predicted its intensity later in life. The studies published from the 1960s to the 1980s never used the term "desistance", instead focusing on "gender-deviant behavior" – childhood femininity in people assigned male at birth – and how this more often predicts homosexuality than "transsexualism" in adulthood. Additionally, some of the research since 2000 and all the research prior has been criticized for citing studies that used conversion therapy: either discouraging social transition, explicitly trying to prevent or discourage the child from identifying as transgender as an adult, or actively employing techniques to limit their "gender-deviant" behavior. The term "desistance" itself has been criticized as pathologizing for its roots in criminal research and oppositional defiance disorder, where desistance is considered a positive outcome.

== Transgender youth activists ==
- Eli Erlick (b. 1995), American trans activist
- Hunter Schafer (b. 1998), American actress and model who campaigned against anti-trans laws as a teenager
- Aimee Challenor (b. 1997), British politician and transgender activist
- Jazz Jennings (b. 2000), American activist and television personality
- Lily Madigan (b. 1998), British activist and the first openly transgender woman to become a Women's Officer within the Labour Party
- Nicole Maines (b. 1997), American actress and transgender rights activist, plays the first television transgender superhero on CW's Supergirl
- Rebekah Bruesehoff (b. 2007), American activist, author, and social media personality

== Media representations ==
=== Film ===
The film Ma Vie en Rose (My Life in Pink) (1997) by Alain Berliner follows a young child named Ludovic, who is assigned male but who lives as a girl and tries to make others agree with her identification. Ludovic's "gender play" incurs conflict within the family and prejudice from the neighbors.

The film Tomboy (2011) by Céline Sciamma follows a 10-year-old with the given name Laure who, after moving to a new neighborhood, dresses as a boy and adopts the name Michael.

The 2015 documentary film Louis Theroux: Transgender Kids follows documentarian Louis Theroux's exploration of the burgeoning transgender youth therapy community in San Francisco, California. He interviews several transgender youth as they engage in medical, social, and psychological therapies to conform to their desired gender identities.

The film 20,000 Species of Bees (2023) by Estibaliz Urresola Solaguren follows the story of an 8-year-old trans girl named Lucía and the effects her identity has on her family.

=== Literature ===
The 1998 non-fiction book Mom, I Need to Be a Girl, written by "Just Evelyn", describes how Evelyn's daughter began transitioning as a teenager and shares resources for trans youth and their families.

Takako Shimura's 2003 manga Wandering Son follows two fifth-graders, Shuichi Nitori and Yoshino Takatsuki, who share their secret feelings about gender with each other. They experiment with different forms of gender expression in increasingly open ways, which eventually leads their friends and families to learn more about their gender identities.

Rachel Gold's 2012 novel Being Emily was the first young adult novel written from a trans person's point of view by a trans person and published by a mainstream publisher.

The 2014 autobiography and picture book, I am Jazz, by Jessica Herthel, Jazz Jennings, and Shelagh McNicholas, focuses on Jenning's childhood experiences of having "a girl brain but a boy body" and how her family learned about and came to accept her transgender identity.

Jo Hirst and Libby Wirt's 2015 picture book The Gender Fairy was written for Hirst's own son, who is transgender. The book's message to trans kids is that they are normal and not alone, and it was written to help children learn about gender concepts and language.

Laura Kate Dale and Ang Hui Qing's 2022 picture book Me and My Dysphoria Monster is about Nisha, a girl who is followed by a growing monster that represents her gender dysphoria.

Magdalene Visaggio and Paulina Ganucheau's 2024 graphic novel Girlmode follows Phoebe Zito, a trans girl who is moving to a new high school. The popular Mackenzie Ishikawa decides to take Phoebe under her wing, but eventually both girls learn more about themselves, the challenges they will face, and how to be real friends to each other.

Nico Lang's 2024 non-fiction book American Teenager: How Trans Kids Are Surviving Hate and Finding Joy in a Turbulent Era details the experiences of eight trans teenagers and their families in the United States. It has a foreword by Susan Stryker.

Sim Butler's 2025 memoir And the Dragons Do Come: Raising a Transgender Kid in Rural America discusses his experience raising a transgender daughter in rural Alabama. He talks about the acceptance and discrimination they face, argues in favor of trans rights, and documents their eventual move to another state following the passage of a law that would block his daughter's healthcare access.

== See also ==
- Gender dysphoria in children
- Healthcare and the LGBT community
- Homelessness among LGBT youth in the United States
- Legal status of transgender people
- List of transgender-related topics
- List of transgender-rights organizations
- Protect trans kids
- Suicide among LGBT youth
- Transphobia
