= Meredith Talusan =

Filipino-American author and editor

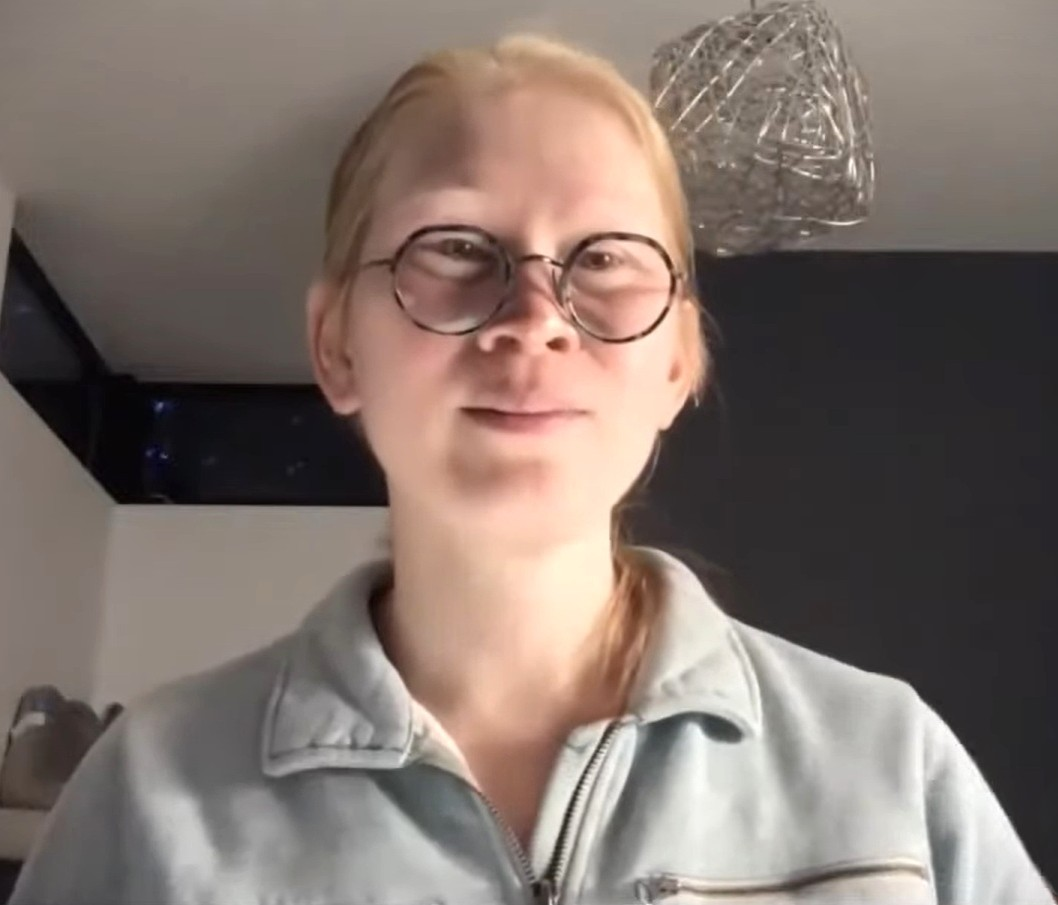
- Talusan does a Book Talk for the Brooklyn Museum in 2020
- Born: June 26, 1975 (age 51); San Rafael, Bulacan, Philippines
- Education: Harvard University, Cornell University, California College of the Arts
- Occupations: Journalist, author
- Website: mtalusan.com

Meredith Talusan (born June 26, 1975) is a Filipino-American author and journalist. She (Note: Talusan uses she/her and they/them pronouns. This article uses she/her for consistency.) is a contributing editor at them. and released her memoir Fairest in 2020, which was nominated for a Lambda Literary Award in Transgender Nonfiction. Talusan has written for a variety of publications including The New York Times, VICE Magazine, The Guardian, and The Atlantic.

== Early life ==
Talusan was born and raised in the town of San Rafael, Bulacan a municipality in the Philippines. She was assigned male at birth and privileged in her home country for her light skin and blond hair due to her condition, albinism. At age 7, Talusan moved to Manila and began acting. Her first role in a popular sitcom that lasted until age 10 launched an acting career that ended by her early teens. Talusan reflects on her childhood fame: "My brush with fame has taught me to value the simple pleasure of moving through the world undisturbed. It also made me keenly aware not just that celebrities can never live up to people’s fantasies, but that the pressure to do so burdens those whom I admire and adore."

Talusan moved to Chino, California at age 15 before attending Harvard University on a scholarship. She lived as a gay man until she transitioned in 2002.

== Education ==
Talusan graduated from Harvard University in 1997 with a Bachelor of Arts in English and American Literature. She earned a Master of Arts in Comparative Literature and a Master of Fine Arts in Creative Writing from Cornell University. She also earned a Master of Fine Arts in Visual Art from California College of the Arts.

== Career ==
Talusan is a journalist and author. She was the first trans staff writer at BuzzFeed and the first trans person to hold an executive position at Condé Nast. She was previously the founding executive editor of them. and currently works as a contributing editor there. Talusan has written for a variety of publications and contributed to several books including Burn it Down, Not That Bad: Dispatches from Rape Culture, and Nasty Women.

Talusan's Mic feature "Unerased: Counting Transgender Lives" won a GLAAD award, The Al Neuharth Award for Innovation in Investigative Journalism, and a Deadline Award from the Society of Professional Journalists in 2017. In 2016, Talusan was nominated for a GLAAD award in the Outstanding Digital Journalism Article category for her VICE Magazine article, "How the Killing of a Trans Filipina Woman Ignited an International Incident."

=== Fairest ===
Talusan's first memoir Fairest was released on May 26, 2020, by Viking Press under Penguin Random House. The memoir details Talusan's journey from life in the Philippines as a boy with albinism to embodying her trans self as a woman in America. It also discusses Talusan's encounters with being mistakenly perceived as cisgender, white, and able-bodied. Talusan talks about how her embodiment within intersections of race, gender, and sexuality made her an outcast, and articulates a personal narrative that shows the ways in which transness can take on a variety of forms.

Fairest is a Lambda Literary Award finalist and received positive praise. The New York Times writes: "Talusan sails past the conventions of trans and immigrant memoirs." The Boston Globe says: "Talusan breathes new life into the well-worn body of the transgender life story." The Library Journal notes Talusan's "rare, frank vulnerability" in describing Fairest as a "debut [that stands] out from the crowd."

=== Other writing ===
In 2025, Talusan wrote the essay "Trick" for Both/And: Essays by Trans and Gender-Nonconforming Writers of Color, edited by Denne Michele Norris and Electric Literature. The collection became a finalist for the 2026 Lambda Literary Award for Transgender Nonfiction.

== Personal life ==
Talusan describes herself as a "queer albino first-generation Filipino immigrant" and is nonbinary, bisexual, and transgender. She belongs to the People of Color (POC), disabled, and feminist communities. Her relationship to and experiences with different communities and identities is a central focus of her memoir Fairest. Talusan currently resides in Barryville, New York and has lived in Brooklyn, Boston, San Francisco, Guatemala, and the Philippines.

Talusan is married to Josh Hanson.
