= Jessica Kingsley Publishers =

International book publisher

- Parent company: Hachette UK (starting in 2017)
- Founded: 1987
- Founder: Jessica Kingsley
- Successor: John Murray (publishing house)
- Headquarters location: London, England, United Kingdom; Philadelphia, Pennsylvania, United States
- Distribution: Macmillan Distribution (UK, Europe, Middle East, Africa and the Far East); Books International (US); UBC Press (Canada); Footprint Books (Australia); United Publishers Services (Japan); Taylor & Francis (Far East); Real Books (South Africa)
- Nonfiction topics: Social sciences, behavioural sciences, special education
- Imprints: Singing Dragon
- Official website: www.jkp.com

Jessica Kingsley Publishers (JKP) is a multinational publishing house headquartered in London. It was founded as an independent publisher in 1987 by Jessica Kingsley. Since 2017, JKP operates as an imprint of John Murray Press.

== History ==
Early on JKP published books pertaining to the social sciences and behavioural sciences, with special attention to art therapy and autism spectrum disorders, respectively. In 2022, the company was described as a "leading publisher in the field of manual therapies and movement".

In 2004, the company opened an American office in Philadelphia. In 2017, Hachette UK acquired JKP, and folded the company into John Murray Press. At the same time, Jessica Kingsley announced her intention to retire. In 2022, JKP acquired the Scottish publishing company Handspring, known for educational and reference book press.

== Awards ==
In 2007, at the first year of the Independent Publishers Awards, JKP won the van Tulleken Publisher of the Year Award for "encapsulating the very best of independent publishing in the UK" and also the Taylor Wessing Academic & Professional Publisher of the Year award.

== Authors ==
- Tony Attwood (The Complete Guide to Asperger Syndrome)
- Simon Baron-Cohen (An Exact Mind)
- Jennifer Cook (Asperkids series, Sisterhood of the Spectrum)
- Jennifer Elder (Different Like Me, Autistic Planet)
- Gunilla Gerland (A Real Person: Life on the Outside)
- Jacqui Jackson (Multicoloured Mayhem, Damned Hard Day)
- Paul Newham (Using Voice and.. in Therapy series, Therapeutic Voicework)
- Rudy Simone (Aspergirls)
- Donna Williams (Nobody Nowhere, Somebody Somewhere, Like Colour to the Blind, Everyday Heaven)
