= Me and My Dysphoria Monster =

2022 picture book by Laura Kate Dale

- Author: Laura Kate Dale
- Illustrator: Ang Hui Qing
- Cover artist: Qing
- Language: English
- Genre: Children's picture book
- Publisher: Jessica Kingsley Publishers
- Publication date: August 18, 2022
- Publication place: United Kingdom
- Pages: 40
- ISBN: 978-1-83997-092-4

Me and My Dysphoria Monster (stylized as Me & My Dysphoria MONSTER) is a 2022 children's picture book written by Laura Kate Dale and illustrated by Ang Hui Qing. It tells the story of a child with gender dysphoria, represented as a monster, and describes their experience living with and overcoming the monster. Dale created the book to provide a resource containing an early trans narrative that was accessible to children. The 40-paged picture book was published in August 2022 by Jessica Kingsley Publishers and was released to positive reception.

== Plot ==
Nisha has a monster that follows her everywhere, and it has recently begun to grow. It grows larger whenever someone refers to Nisha as a boy or tells her she must play on a boys' sports team. Nisha wants the monster to go away, but it doesn't listen to her. The monster starts interfering with Nisha's life, stopping her from swimming and playing with her friends. One day Nisha's dad introduces her to his friend Jack, who also has a monster.

Nisha asks Jack how he got his monster to go away. After their conversation, Nisha is very happy, and talks to her parents. Nisha begins to change some things like the clothes she wears so that she is happier about herself. With every change, Nisha's monster begins to shrink. She begins to swim and play with her friends again. Nisha becomes happier and more confident, and in time becomes a happy adult.

== Genre and style ==
Me and My Dysphoria Monster is a children’s picture book intended for children ages 6–10. In the back of the book, it includes a terminology guide. The illustrations are in a cartoony style with saturated colors and cute characters. The book contains many diverse characters, including the main character, Nisha, who is depicted with brown skin.

== Development ==
Dale wrote Me and My Dysphoria Monster in early 2021. One of the main reasons Dale created the book was to provide trans representation in a way that was accessible to children, noting "many resources for trans people are written in inaccessible, clinical language for children, or lean too far the other way and do not use proper terms to talk about trans identity." The metaphor of a monster to represent gender dysphoria was influenced from negative representations of trans people Dale experienced in her youth. Dale said that the depictions of trans people she encountered during the early 90s were damaging, and occurred at a time when she needed stories affirming that she wasn't alone in her thoughts.

The book is aimed at young trans people, their parents, and peers. Dale wanted to create a resource that her younger self could have benefited from having access to. Dale said that the core narrative "has child-accessible language to talk about the internal experience of being a dysphoric trans person." She also wanted to create a resource presenting gender dysphoria and transition in an accessible way to cisgender children. Dale noted that the choice to convey part of the narrative through images was due to the positivity Dale felt after socially transitioning. "That sort of physical lifting and brightness is something I think is just better portrayed with images than it is with words alone."

== Reception ==
Me and My Dysphoria Monster received positive reception. Kirkus Reviews thought that the book "will speak to and delight trans children of various experiences." They considered the text to mostly flow easily, and described the illustrations as "cute and colorful, with a high-contrast cartoony style." They thought, however, that the book relied somewhat on visual shorthand for gender stereotypes and noted that when Nisha is told that she seems to be taller and have a deeper voice than most girls, those traits would not apply to a child at her age. Overall, they described the book as "a charming book for trans kids and those seeking to build understanding."

The book was longlisted for Best Picture Book at the 2023 Diverse Book awards.

In March 2025, the library board for Rutherford County, Tennessee voted to ban the book.
