= Vanessa Angélica Villarreal =

American poet, essayist, and cultural critic

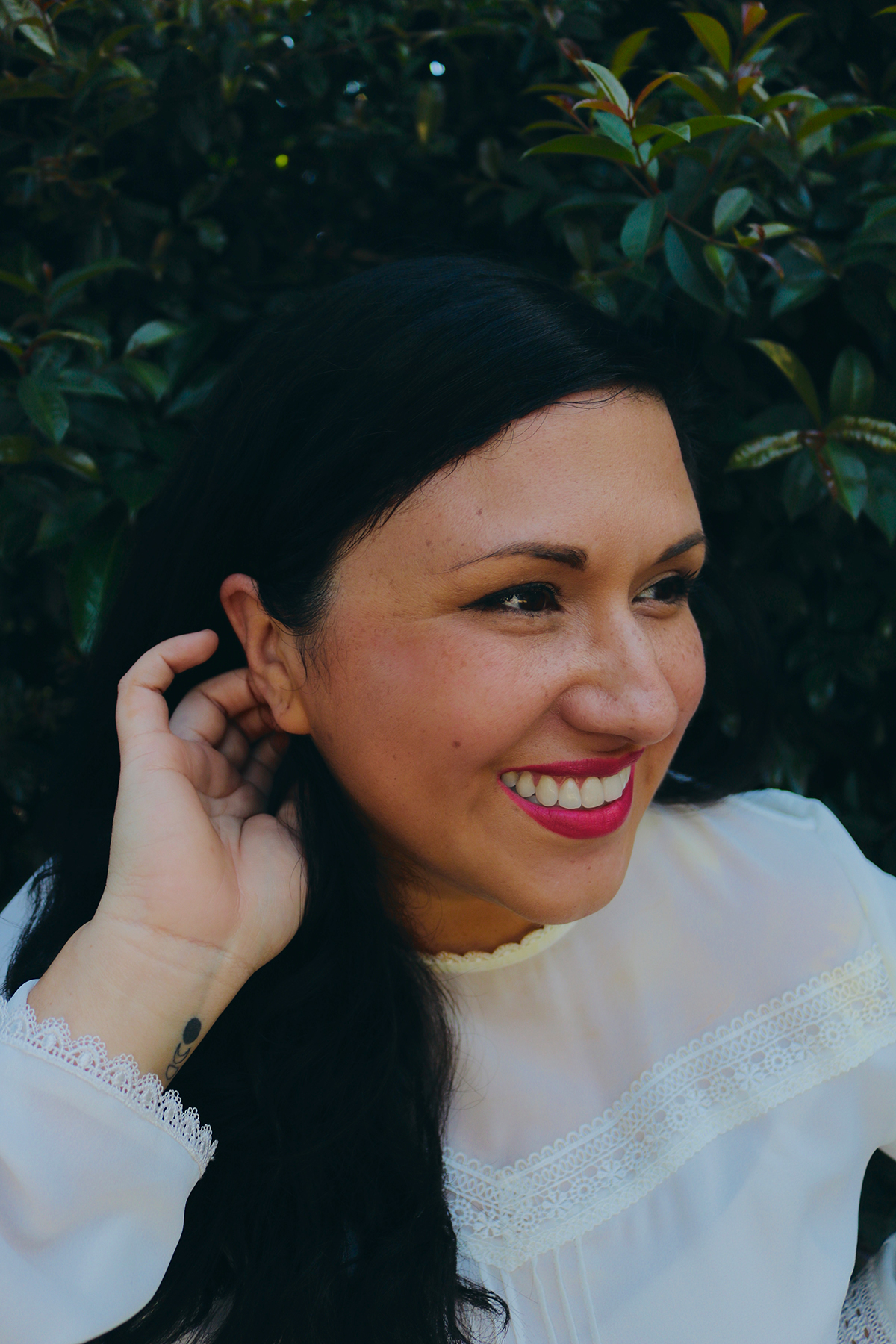
- Villarreal in 2021
- Born: McAllen, Texas, U.S.
- Education: University of Houston; University of Colorado Boulder (MFA); University of Southern California (PhD)
- Occupations: Poet; essayist; cultural critic
- Writing career
- Language: English
- Notable works: Beast Meridian (2017); Magical/Realism (2024)
- Notable awards: Whiting Award (2019); National Book Award for Nonfiction longlist (2024)
- Website: vanessaangelicavillarreal.com

Vanessa Angélica Villarreal is a bilingual American poet, essayist, and cultural critic of Mexican descent, whose work focuses on first-generation immigrant experience, pop culture, hybrid experimental and visual poetry, and transnational feminist documentary poetics.

She is a recipient of a 2021 National Endowment for the Arts Fellowship in Creative Writing and in 2019, she won a Whiting Award for poetry. She was also a 2019 Kate Tufts Discovery Award finalist for her book, Beast Meridian (Noemi Press, Akrilica Series, 2017).

Her work has appeared in major media outlets and magazines including The Cut, Oxford American, The Academy of American Poets, POETRY magazine, Harper's Bazaar, BuzzFeed, The Boston Review, and The New York Times, among others.

== Early life and education ==
Vanessa Angélica Villarreal was born in McAllen, Texas to a mixed-status Mexican immigrant family, and descendants of indigenous cotton laborers in Northern Mexico. She moved to Houston, Texas at five years old, where her maternal grandmother could receive no-cost medical care for cervical cancer at MD Anderson Cancer Center. Her mother is a florist, and her father Gilberto Villarreal is a rock in español and cumbia guitarist who has played with bands such as Canela India, Los Super Villahnos, Fito Olivares, Sabiduria Norteña, Rolando Becerra, and others. Her family are notable influences on her life and work. The death of her maternal grandmother, and her experiences of racist, sexist, and homophobic discrimination in the Texas public school system, led to troubled preteen and adolescent years and psychiatric hospitalization, which she writes about in her award-winning book, Beast Meridian (Noemi Press, Akrilica Series, 2017).

She is a first-generation college student, attending the University of Houston and several community colleges from 2000 to 2011 while working multiple retail and food service jobs. She graduated summa cum laude in 2011. She received her Master of Fine Arts in Creative Writing in 2014 from the University of Colorado at Boulder, and her doctorate in English Literature and Creative Writing from the University of Southern California in 2024.

== Career and writing ==
Vanessa Angélica Villarreal's writing is noted for its experimental, visual, and hybrid forms, including multimedia performances and video. She attributes her experimentation to growing up in a bilingual Mexican/American household among working-class musicians and immigrants in Houston and the borderlands. Her work uses the language of institutional and state and documents, archives, music, pop culture, science, and medicine to restore land and memory to its state before the colonial encounter, reanimate the ghosts of migration, and interrogate medical, state, and intimate state violence. She is "interested in what can be found, animated, and restored in the remains of violence, and how poetry and language can record the fragments of survivor-memory and fill the spaces between documents, photos, artifacts, and objects." In 2019, the Whiting Award Selection Committee wrote of her work, "The poems of Vanessa Angélica Villarreal transport readers into a wilderness, a porous border world of dual (or multiple) identities. Visually striking, rooted in the borderlands, Beast Meridian is a fiercely feminist book that refuses easy closure and answers. The lines blaze with anger and empathy, and the craft astonishes. Beast Meridian will serve as an example of what’s possible in American poetry in the twenty-first century. In a word: gorgeous."

External videos
- "Exercise in the Face of Divorce (after David Campos). The Rumpus, April 2018."
- "Estrellada, from Beast Meridian. Apogee, March 2017.
- "2019 Whiting Award Winners Reading at The Strand Bookstore, New York, NY. Tropical Depression, from Beast Meridian."
- "Crossover Album, from Beast Meridian for the Ours Poetica Web Series from the Poetry Foundation."
- "Vanessa Angélica Villarreal reads Malinche, from Beast Meridian, Thursday November 21, 2019, at The Poetry Center, San Francisco State University."

She is also an essayist and cultural critic, and has published criticism and personal essays with a feminist and critical race lens on RuPaul's Drag Race, VIDA, Selena: The Series, and The Witcher 3:Wild Hunt. Her essay and cultural criticism collection on race, gender, and fantasy, Magical/Realism, was released in 2024 by Tiny Reparations Books, an imprint of Plume/Dutton and Penguin Random House. The collection was longlisted for the National Book Award for Nonfiction.

Villarreal is a CantoMundo Fellow. She was a mentor for PEN Emerging Voices 2020.

== Personal life ==
Villarreal is a single mother currently living in Los Angeles, California. From 2019 to 2021, she was an Arts for Justice Fellow with the University of Arizona Poetry Center, where she dedicated her time to abolitionist groups and efforts, and advocated for migrant mothers, women, children, and incarcerated adolescent girls.

== Awards and honors ==
- 2025 Shortlist for the Housatonic Book Award for Nonfiction
- 2025 Shortlist for the Reading the West 35th Annual book award in Memoir
- 2024 Longlist for the National Book Award for Nonfiction
- 2024 Longlist for the National Book Critics Circle Award for Criticism
- 2021 National Endowment for the Arts Creative Writing Fellowship
- 2019-2021 University of Arizona Art for Justice Fellowship
- 2019 Whiting Award, Poetry
- 2019 Kate Tufts Discovery Award Finalist
- 2019 Friends of Literature Prize, POETRY Magazine
- 2018 John A. Robertson Award for Best First Book of Poetry, Texas Institute of Letters

== Works ==
- Beast Meridian (Noemi Press, Akrilica Series, 2017) ISBN 9781934819654
- Best American Experimental Writing 2020 (Wesleyan University Press, 2020) ISBN 0819579580
- "Body Type 1" Both/And: Essays by Trans and Gender-Nonconforming Writers of Color (HarperOne) ISBN 978-0-06341-437-2
- Embodied: An Intersectional Feminist Comics Poetry Anthology (A Wave Blue World Inc, 2021) ISBN 1949518132
- Magical/Realism (Tiny Reparations Books, 2024) ISBN 9780593187142
