= Freaks, Geeks, and Asperger Syndrome =

Book by Luke Jackson

Freaks, Geeks, and Asperger Syndrome: A User Guide to Adolescence
- Author: Luke Jackson
- Language: English
- Subject: Asperger Syndrome
- Genre: Non-fiction
- Publisher: Jessica Kingsley Publishers
- Publication date: 15 August 2002
- Publication place: England
- Media type: Paperback
- Pages: 224
- ISBN: 978-1-84310-098-0
- Followed by: Crystalline Lifetime: Fragments of Asperger Syndrome

Freaks, Geeks, and Asperger Syndrome: A User Guide to Adolescence is a non-fiction book about Asperger syndrome published in 2003. The then 13-year-old author, Luke Jackson, has Asperger syndrome himself. Jackson wrote the book because he felt there was not enough useful information on the Internet about the subject.

Jackson is the son of fellow writer Jacqui Jackson, and most of his siblings have similar difficulties.

== Reception ==
David Worling of the Canadian Academy of Child and Adolescent Psychiatry said that the book is filled with valuable information and is useful to have in a clinical library.

The book received first place in Times Educational Supplement awards in 2003 for special educational needs books.

== Other works and sequel ==
About the same time as Freaks, Geeks & Asperger Syndrome, Jackson wrote A User Guide to the GF/CF Diet: For Autism, Asperger Syndrome and ADHD.

Jackson has written a column on the BBC's ouch!.. it's a disability thing.

In 2016, Jackson wrote a sequel to Freaks, Geeks & Asperger Syndrome, Sex, Drugs and Asperger's Syndrome (ASD): A User Guide to Adulthood.

Jackson has written a poetry book titled Crystalline Lifetime: Fragments of Asperger's Syndrome, (2006).
