= United States Congress transgender bathroom dispute =

2024 House bill introduced by Nancy Mace

On November 18, 2024, Nancy Mace introduced a bathroom bill in the US House of Representatives to ban transgender people, and specifically newly elected member Sarah McBride, from using bathrooms other than those of their sex assigned at birth. Two days later, U.S. House speaker Mike Johnson declared that Mace's ban was being ushered in.

The bill seeks to prevent "members, officers, and employees of the House from using single-sex facilities other than those corresponding to their biological sex". Mace stated her intent was to act as a litmus test for women's rights among male Republican politicians.

== Capitol bathroom bans ==
On November 18, 2024, Mace introduced a resolution to ban transgender people from using bathrooms other than those of their sex assigned at birth at the U.S. Capitol, in anticipation of the swearing in of Sarah McBride, who is the first trans person elected to Congress. Mace misgendered McBride in several statements, and said it was "offensive" for a trans woman to think of herself as her equal. She confirmed that McBride was "absolutely" the target of her bathroom resolution. Talking to Leland Vittert, Mace announced that she would "fight like hell" to exclude McBride from women's restrooms on the Capitol. Mace's 2024 House resolution would prevent McBride from using "single-sex facilities". H. Res. 1579 was entitled, "Prohibiting Members, officers, and employees of the House from using single-sex facilities other than those corresponding to their biological sex, and for other purposes." Mary Miller and Matt Rosendale co-sponsored her bathroom resolution.

Mike Johnson's bathroom ban extends to trans and non-binary staff members, interns, and any visitors, including members of the public. The ban was renewed when the 119th United States Congress convened on January 3, 2025.

== Bill expansion ==
One day after the bathroom bill, Marjorie Taylor Greene expressed her chagrin that Mace's bill did not go far enough. Greene told reporter Pablo Manríquez, "I support a resolution that keeps all biological men out of women's bathrooms, locker rooms, and private places. Not only here in the Capitol complex, our office buildings, but all taxpayer-funded facilities". Two days later, Mace announced a new expanded House resolution to ban "Biological Men from Women's Spaces on All Federal Property". The broader bill was "H.R.10186 – To prohibit individuals from accessing or using single-sex facilities on Federal property other than those corresponding to their biological sex, and for other purposes". Michael Rulli and Marjorie Taylor Greene announced their support and co-sponsorship.

== Protests ==
Demonstrators protested the Capitol bathroom ban that requires birth-based bathroom usage on December 5, 2024. Capitol Police arrested 15 protesters, including Chelsea Manning and Raquel Willis. Manning said: "I'm here today because every person deserves dignity and respect, both in daily life and in more symbolic places like the U.S. Capitol." The protesters chanted, "Democrats, grow a spine!" Willis said: "In the 2024 election, trans folks were left to fend for ourselves after nearly $200 million of attack ads were disseminated across the United States."

Mace addressed the protesters with a transphobic slur. Mace posted on X, "The trannies came, they saw and they did not conquer during their protest", which was labeled "hateful conduct" by X staff. Mace also used a bullhorn to issue a Miranda warning to the protestors.

== Reactions ==
Critics of the ban and its Republican supporters accused them of hypocrisy since other politicians, such as Donald Trump and some potential members of his administration, have been accused of sexual assault. Additionally, critics have decried that transphobia has become a central GOP policy. Jen Psaki has urged Democrats to confront bigotry head-on.

The chair and co-chair of the Congressional Equality Caucus, Mark Pocan and Becca Balint, criticized the House Speaker's bathroom ban, saying it was an "incredibly craven and cruel attack" on McBride, intended to "dehumanize" her. Other politicians who have also criticized Mace's comments and actions include Eric Sorensen, Robert Garcia, Tammy Duckworth, Hakeem Jeffries, Sara Jacobs, and Alexandria Ocasio-Cortez.

Mace has also been criticized in the media. On The View, Sara Haines said Mace was a bully. The Daily Show co-host Desi Lydic said Mace was "trying to get actual predators into the highest levels of government". Ana Kasparian of The Young Turks criticized Mace for attacking and misgendering McBride in an interview. On the basis of Mace's Human Rights Campaign Scorecard, an LGBTQ Nation analysis suggested she was "always a transphobic extremist".

In response to the bathroom ban, GLAAD issued a press release stating: "'Biological sex' is not an accurate nor a scientific term, but is used by opponents of transgender people to dehumanize them and deny their equal access to society." Advocates for Trans Equality criticized Mace's measures, saying they were "designed to divide us" and "unfairly single out a vulnerable community". Kelley Robinson, president of the Human Rights Campaign, said the policy was "cruel and discriminatory" and affected "all trans and nonbinary people who work and visit the Capitol".

Elon Musk tweeted his support for Mace with a meme containing the text: "your mental illness is not my new reality". Megyn Kelly misgendered McBride and said she must use "the men's bathroom". Trans-rights activist Stephanie Wade has criticized Representative-elect Sarah McBride for her acquiescence to follow the rules of the house, arguing that it ignores the dignity and safety of gender minorities.

Whereas most of Mace's tweets relating to the topic were promoted, two received a warning label from X for hate speech on December 5, 2024. Mace denied the assertion, writing, "It's not hate speech." In interviews, Mace has also misgendered McBride, saying, "I'm not into pronouns. I don't care... I'm not going to play into this gender ideology." Mace says she has received multiple death threats over the bathroom bill, saying, "Men that want to use women's restrooms are threatening to kill me over this issue."

Associated Press reported, "Some activists criticized McBride for not fighting back more forcefully against the Capitol bathroom ban. She agrees it's important for trans people to access public facilities, but says she will respond with grace." McBride said, "At the end of the day, our ability to have a pluralistic, diverse democracy requires some foundation of kindness and grace. And I believe in that so strongly that even when it's difficult, I will seek to summon it."

== See also ==
- 2020s anti-LGBTQ movement in the United States
- Executive Order 14168
- Bathroom bill
- Transphobia in the US House of Representatives
