= Laura Kate Dale =

British video game journalist

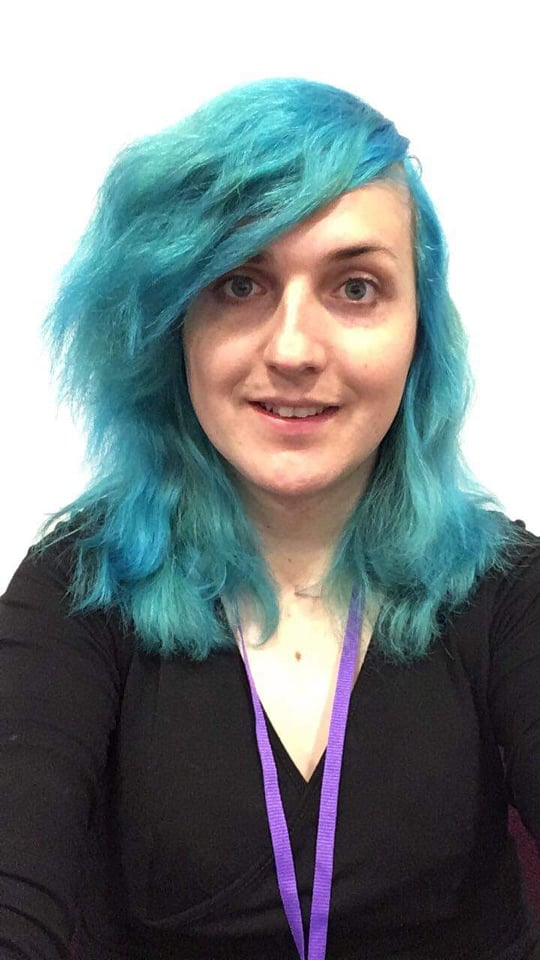
- Born: Early 1990s Bournemouth, England
- Occupation: Author
- Spouse: Jane Magnet-Dale
- Awards: Wins: MCV 30 Under 30 2015; Finalist: Games Media Wwards 2015 Rising Star, MCV Women in Games Awards 2019 Journalist of the Year
- Website: laurakbuzz.com

Laura Kate Dale is an English video game journalist, author and activist. She is known for writing about the transgender and autism communities in relation to video games and for her video game industry leaks. Many of her topics tackle accessibility for disabled players and LGBTQ+ representation.

== Game journalism ==
Dale has worked at gaming site Destructoid. Dale was also the news editor for gaming site Kotaku UK for almost two years. She left the position in June 2019 to pursue other projects. She has also written for The Guardian.

Dale is known for her videogame leaks. She leaked the existence of Until Dawn: Rush of Blood in 2015 and the PlayStation 4 Slim in 2016. She also leaked details about the Nintendo Switch and Mario + Rabbids Kingdom Battle.

Dale was awarded inclusion in MCV's 30 Under 30 list in 2015. The same year she was a finalist for MCV's Games Media Awards 2015 Rising Star. In 2019 she was a finalist for the MCV Women in Games Awards.

== Books ==
Dale has published five books. Her first book is Things I Learned from Mario's Butt: A Series of Gaming Butt Critiques, which was funded on the crowdfunding website Unbound in 2018.

Her second book, a memoir called Uncomfortable Labels: My Life as a Gay Autistic Trans Woman, was published by Jessica Kingsley Publishers in 2019.

Her third book, Gender Euphoria: Stories of Joy from Trans, Non-Binary and Intersex Writers, which was crowdfunded through Unbound and exceeded its funding goal, was published in 2021. It was intended as a counterpoint to the focus so often placed on the negative aspects of being trans, such as gender dysphoria, and was instead written "to show the world the sheer variety of ways being non cisgender can be a beautiful, joyful experience".

Dale's fourth book, Who Hunts the Whale, is co-written by her wife Jane Magnet, and being funded through the crowdfunding publisher Unbound. Who Hunts the Whale is Dale's first work of fiction. The website summary reads, "Who Hunts the Whale is a completely fictional, entirely made-up novel set in the imaginary world of the video gaming industry. Written with a gamer's wit and an insider's precision, it holds the real-world business up to a carnival house of mirrors, to give a satirical look at the human cost of a rapacious market that must constantly be fed new content."

Dale's fifth book, Me and My Dysphoria Monster, is a children's picture book about the experiences of gender dysphoria in childhood. The book was illustrated by Ang Hui Qing, and published by Jessica Kingsley Publishers in August 2022.

== Activism ==
Dale collaborated with former founder of the Trans Rights Collective UK (disbanded in 2020), Felix Fern, in 2021 to co-organise a 'trans rights' protest outside Downing Street in London on 6 August 2021, calling on the government to implement better rights and equality for transgender and non-binary people in the United Kingdom. The protest featured a roster of speakers including prominent UK trans activists such as Fox Fisher and Roz Kaveney as well as Dale herself, and was attended by the British human rights campaigner Peter Tatchell.

She has since been part of other activism projects such as writing an open letter to the BBC that was signed by over 20,000 people, calling for them to be held accountable for publishing the article originally titled "We're being pressured into sex by some trans women", which the letter greatly criticized for, among other things, publishing the results of a study that the letter labelled as "deeply flawed".

== Personal life ==
Dale is transgender and married to podcaster Jane Magnet. The couple, who are both train enthusiasts, married in August 2021 on board an Avanti West Coast train after winning a competition for a train-based wedding. The couple had planned to marry sooner but had delayed their plans due to the COVID-19 pandemic and the requirement to obtain Gender Recognition Certificates in order to marry as women.

Dale has attention deficit hyperactivity disorder and aphantasia.
