= Halimah Marcus =

American writer and editor

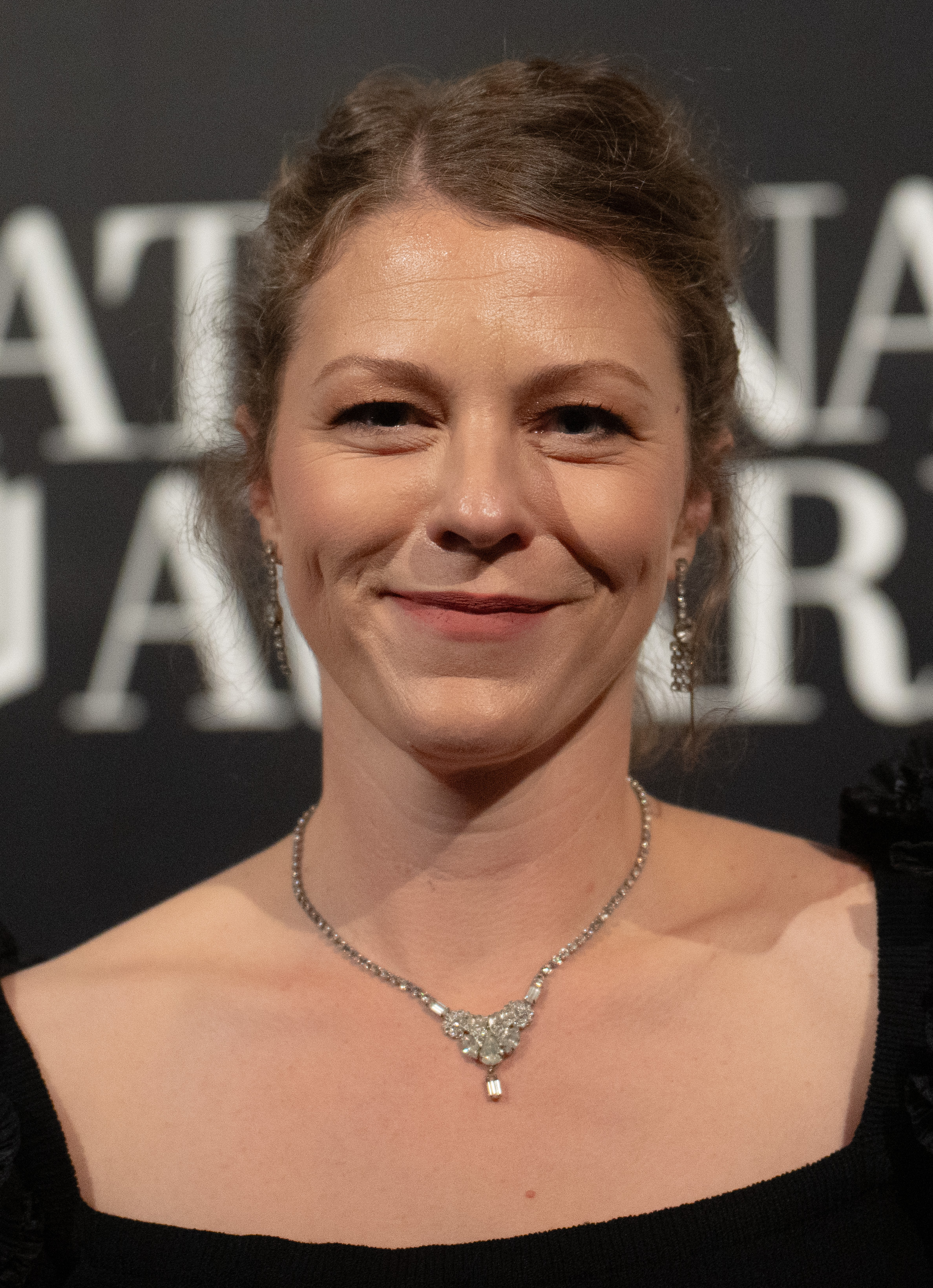
- Marcus in 2024
- Education: Brooklyn College (MFA)
- Occupation(s): Writer, editor
- Organization: Electric Literature
- Website: halimahmarcus.com

Halimah Marcus is an American writer and editor. She is the executive director of Electric Literature and the editor-in-chief of its Recommended Reading section. In 2021, she edited an anthology called Horse Girls: Recovering, Aspiring, and Devoted Riders Redefine the Iconic Bond, with Harper Perennial.

== Education ==
Marcus rode horses in high school but stopped in college and adulthood; she felt at a crossroads with the discipline and also found it difficult to maintain due to financial, educational, and time constraints. It was after she stopped horse riding that she started working on her career as a writer. Later, when she was 30, Marcus moved to New York City to attend an MFA program in fiction at Brooklyn College.

== Career ==
In 2010, Marcus began volunteering at Electric Literature. Over time, she assumed numerous roles and responsibilities in the publication. In 2012, she helped launched its Recommended Reading section alongside editor Benjamin Samuel. The section's premise was to publish a fiction piece for free once a week on Tumblr, a model that sought to combine a sense of editorial curation with more modern trends in media distribution on the internet. By 2014, Marcus was helping usher the publication's transformation into an arts nonprofit. In March 2016, she was appointed to be the nonprofit's first-ever executive director.

In 2021, Marcus released an anthology she edited, called Horse Girls: Recovering, Aspiring, and Devoted Riders Redefine the Iconic Bond, published by Harper Perennial. For the book, Marcus edited several essays by women with experience riding horses. Publishers Weekly gave the book a starred review and included it in their top picks, stating: "The essays are tender, critical, and deeply personal, and the universal themes of growth and belonging come through consistently but, refreshingly, never feel repetitive." The Washington Post said "because they represent such a refreshing diversity of voices, there's a story here for just about everyone." The book was additionally featured by O, The Oprah Magazine, The Washington Informer, and others.

Marcus' fiction has appeared in One Story, BOMB Magazine, and others. Her short story, "The Party Goers", was a distinguished story in The Best American Short Stories 2022 edited by Andrew Sean Greer.
