= Nobody Nowhere =

Book by Donna Williams

- First edition
- Author: Donna Williams
- Genre: Autobiography
- Publisher: Doubleday
- Publication date: 1992
- Pages: 224
- ISBN: 978-1-85302-718-5
- OCLC: 56965690
- Followed by: Somebody Somewhere

Nobody Nowhere: The Extraordinary Autobiography of an Autistic Girl is the award-nominated debut book by Australian Donna Williams. It was initially published in Britain in 1992, and was on the New York Times Best Seller list for 15 weeks in the first half of 1993.

Nobody Nowhere covers Williams' life from as far back as she can remember (three years old). At times, she was thought to be deaf, psychotic, disturbed, or retarded, but only as an adult did she discover that her difficulty interfacing with the world around her was related to autism. It ends with her leaving the manuscript behind with a UK child psychiatrist, Sebastian Kraemer, who sent it on to autism specialist Frances Tustin, who was responsible for its eventual publication.

Donna Williams is also the author of the screenplay of the same name which is optioned to Hollywood film producer, Beverly Nero.

Williams released a music album by the same name in 2000.

Somebody Somewhere (1994) was the sequel. This installment picks up the story of her becoming a teacher and the first book becoming published, and how that changed her life. Later autobiographical works include Like Colour To The Blind (1998) and Everyday Heaven (2004), which are among her nine published books.
