= Donna Williams =

Australian writer (1963–2017)

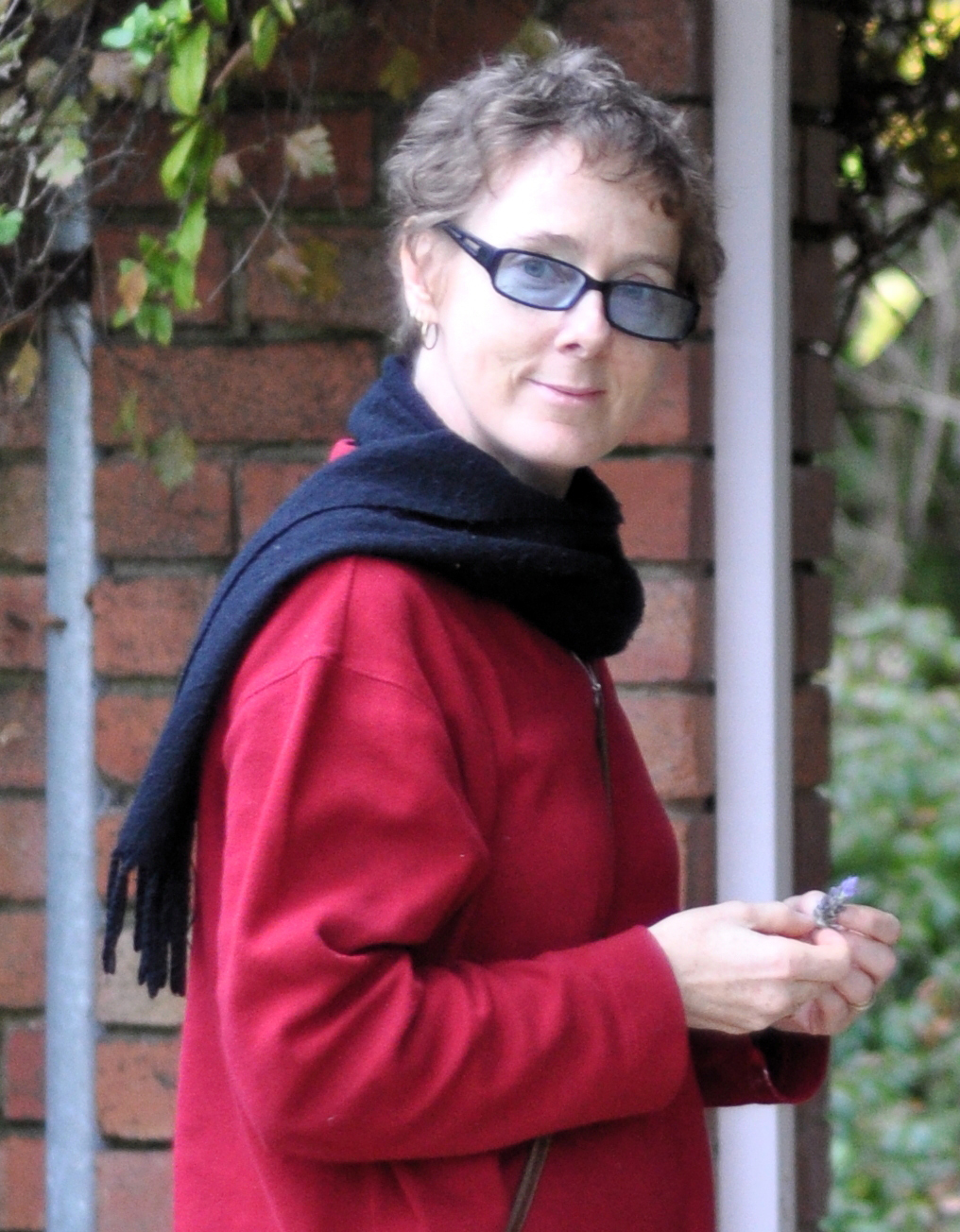
- Williams in 2011
- Born: Donna Keene; 12 October 1963; Melbourne, Australia
- Died: 22 April 2017 (aged 53); Ringwood East, Victoria, Australia
- Occupation: Writer
- Spouses: Ian (1993–1995); Chris Samuel (2000–2017)
- Writing career
- Period: 1992–2017
- Genres: Non-fiction; Autobiography; Poetry
- Notable works: Nobody Nowhere: The Extraordinary Autobiography of an Autistic Girl; Somebody Somewhere: Breaking Free from the World of Autism; Like Colour to the Blind: Soul Searching and Soul Finding
- Movement: Autism rights
- Website: www.donnawilliams.net

Donna Leanne Williams (born Donna Keene; 12 October 1963 – 22 April 2017), also known by her married name Donna Leanne Samuel and as Polly Samuel, was an Australian writer, artist, singer-songwriter, screenwriter, and sculptor.

In 1965, aged two, Williams was assessed as "psychotic". During the rest of her childhood, she was tested multiple times for deafness and labelled as "disturbed". In 1991, she was diagnosed as autistic and also underwent treatment for gut, immune system and sensory perceptual disorders. She wrote four memoirs: Nobody Nowhere: The Extraordinary Autobiography of an Autistic Girl (1992), Somebody Somewhere: Breaking Free from the World of Autism (1994), Like Colour to the Blind: Soul Searching and Soul Finding (1998) and Everyday Heaven: Journeys Beyond the Stereotypes of Autism (2004) – and released two albums, Nobody Nowhere and Mutation. She was the subject of several TV documentaries during the '90s.

Williams wrote textbooks on the autism spectrum and was a qualified teacher, international public speaker and autism consultant.

Williams died of cancer in April 2017.

== Early life and education ==
Donna Leanne Williams was born Donna Keene in October 1963. She grew up in Melbourne with an older brother, James, and a younger brother, Tom Williams (the street artist Duel; born 1969). The name Donna was chosen by her mother; however, her father called her Polly, the name she most identified with, and she legally changed her name to Polly in 2015.

According to the New York Times review of Williams's first book, her earliest memories included "rubbing her eyes furiously to lose herself in 'bright spots of fluffy color', which she found a soothing refuge against the 'intrusive gabble' of the human world around her". Her father, Ellis John Keene, later known as Jack Williams (1936–1995), was bipolar and aloof, while her mother was an alcoholic who was physically and emotionally abusive.

In 1965, at the age of two, Williams was assessed as a psychotic infant; subsequently, throughout her childhood, she was tested multiple times for deafness and labelled as "disturbed". Williams alleged on her blog that she had been sexually assaulted by comedian Barry Humphries at the age of eight during a party held by her father. By the age of nine, she had developed two alternate personalities: "Willie", her "rebellious, disruptive, and bad-mannered side" and "Carol", the "kind, polite, socially acceptable child". That year, she was also diagnosed with various dietary conditions including "milk allergies, dairy [and] gluten intolerances[; and] salicylate intolerance" and was placed on a multivitamin and zinc regime. At fifteen, Williams left home and worked in various jobs but struggled to support herself. At times she was homeless, passing from boyfriend to boyfriend while suffering "gross cruelty and domestic prostitution in relationships with men".

With the help of a psychiatric social worker, Williams finished secondary education and enrolled in tertiary studies. From 1982, Williams started studying at La Trobe University and eventually graduated with a Bachelor of Arts and Diploma of Education in 1990.

== Autism ==
In 1991, Williams was diagnosed with autism by Lawrence Bartak, a specialist at Monash Medical Centre and a senior lecturer in psychology at the associated Monash University. Bartak later recalled "[Williams] displayed all the main features of autism when I met her, including one she wouldn't have known about ... The fact that she was apparently sociable and interacting with people doesn't mean she didn't have some type of disorder". Bartak helped Williams "begin building bridges instead of walls between worlds". In July 1996, doubts about Williams's condition were aired on Radio National's The Health Report and by The Australian newspaper. The claims of "faking it" were denied by both Williams and Bartak. In February 2005, David Smukler, writing in the American Association on Intellectual and Developmental Disabilities' journal Mental Retardation, noted that back in the mid-1990s some sceptics had a poorly defined understanding of the autism spectrum: "...autistic people such as Donna Williams and Temple Grandin started to publish first-person accounts that described their lives as autistic people living in an often-inhospitable nonautistic world. Many readers of these early accounts questioned whether or not the authors were really autistic. The assumption underlying such responses is that autism is so incapacitating that Williams or Grandin could not be autistic and still write with such insight and sensitivity. When their books first appeared, autistic authors were characterized either as frauds or exceptions". Smukler concluded: "Today, Williams' and Grandin's 'credentials' are rarely challenged. Rather than being doubted, they are more likely to be commended for offering us an 'inside out' view of autism".

== Career ==
By 1992, Williams was a qualified teacher. Subsequently, she became an international public speaker and an autism consultant. In 2002, she joined the United Kingdom's Medical Research Council's review into the causes of autism, where she was appointed to the lay-person's panel.

== Work ==
=== Books ===
In 1992, Williams published her first book, an autobiographical account titled Nobody Nowhere: The Extraordinary Autobiography of an Autistic Girl (Doubleday, London). It was an international best seller including spending fifteen weeks on The New York Times Best Seller list for adult non-fiction in 1993. It was short-listed for the New South Wales Premier's Literary Awards for non-fiction in 1992. According to Kirkus Reviews the book enabled people associated with autistic individuals, to "understand more clearly what those unresponsive 'dead eyes' see". While Daniel Goleman of The New York Times described how Williams "originally wrote it as a series of notes to herself, to help her make sense of her own chaotic world. She planned to burn her journal until a therapist helped her see the value in sharing it".

Her second autobiography, Somebody Somewhere: Breaking Free from the World of Autism, appeared in 1994. Marguerite Mroz of Library Journal noted that Williams describes getting the first book published, including "[h]er extraordinary and painful growth as she completes her education, continues psychiatric treatment, experiences the unwelcome publicity brought about by the publication of Nobody Nowhere". Kirkus Review found Williams had become "more emotionally vulnerable than ever, unprotected by the ritualistic noises and movements typical of autism and determined not to call on the false selves that helped her function in the world 'out there'". Later autobiographical works include Like Colour to the Blind: Soul Searching and Soul Finding (1996), and Everyday Heaven: Journeys Beyond the Stereotypes of Autism (2004). Emily Golson in Williams's entry in Encyclopedia of Women's Autobiography (2005) finds that "[her] writing mirrors the convolutions of her thought processes: disjointed, sometimes rambling, often filled with images that convey a jumble of colors, sounds and attitudes".

Williams wrote several non-fiction books on intellectual and developmental conditions, especially on the autism spectrum Autism – an Inside-out Approach: An Innovative Look at the Mechanics of Autism and Its Developmental Cousins (1996), Autism and Sensing: The Unlost Instinct (1998), Exposure Anxiety - The Invisible Cage: An Exploration of Self-Protection Responses in the Autism Spectrum (15 September 2002), and The Jumbled Jigsaw: An Insider's Approach to the Treatment of Autistic Spectrum "Fruit Salads" (2006). Her first collection of poetry and prose, Not Just Anything: A Collection of Thoughts on Paper (2004), was published by Jessica Kingsley Publishers. A second collection, Weirdos Like Me, appeared in September 2009.

=== Television documentaries ===
Williams was the subject of several TV documentaries. "My Experience with Autism, Emotion and Behavior" (1993), an episode, on Eye to Eye with Connie Chung was broadcast in the United States. Beth Fouse and Maria Wheeler describe Williams's interview and her mode of communication in their book, A Treasure Chest of Behavioral Strategies for Individuals with Autism (1997). Williams had "difficulties in processing incoming information. She needed to listen or look. She could not use auditory and visual channels at the same time". On Jam Jar (1995), by Fresh Film in association with BBC Four, which aired in the UK, Williams provided her audience with a greater depth of understanding of autism. The documentary provided Joe Geraci with Williams's "provocative argument about academics coming to some kind of understanding of autism" where she described the 'inside-out' world, "[an autistic] has his own system, and it's not an infantile version of [the non-autistic person's] system; they haven't learned his system". Yokosho Watashi No Sekai E "Jiheisho" Donna Williams (1995), was broadcast by NHK TV in Japan. Krankheit als Schicksal (English: Illness as fate), was filmed in 1995, by Hamburg's Spiegel TV, and was aired on 25 January 1997 in Germany. It is titled Dann Verstehe Ich Auch Nur Bla, Bla, Bla (English: Then I Only Understood Too Much Bla, Bla, Bla).

In September 2010, Orlai Produkciós Iroda of Hungary produced a monodrama, Nemsenkilény, monológ nemmindegyembereknek ("Not a nobody creature") presented by Börcsök Enikő, from a book by autistic author, Henriett Seth F. which appeared in theatres and on TV. The script contains quotations from Nobody Nowhere along with Birger Sellin's Don't want to Be Inside Me Anymore, and Mark Haddon's The Curious Incident of the Dog in the Night-time.

=== Music and art ===
Williams's debut album, titled Nobody Nowhere after her first autobiography, was released in 2000; it is a collaboration with Paul Farrer. Two tracks, "Sometimes" and "Beyond the When", feature in the 2000 Tokyo Broadcasting System Television series Things You Taught Me. The 12-part series follows the life of an autistic woman developing her human interaction skills. In July 2005, she followed up Nobody Nowhere with a second album titled Mutation. It is a collaboration with Akash, an Australian composer, producer and arranger. Both albums feature music and lyrics by Williams, with Mutation including spoken word poetry in addition to music. Williams was a self-taught painter, beginning in adulthood. She was also a sculptor and completed life-sized sculptures.

== Personal life ==
Williams was the older sister of mural and graffiti artist "Duel" (Tom Williams, born 1969).

As well as autism, Williams also had prosopagnosia, underwent therapy for post-traumatic stress disorder at various points in her life and was diagnosed with dissociative identity disorder in 2010 and Ehlers–Danlos syndrome type IV in March 2013.

In 1993, Williams married Ian. They divorced after two years. Their relationship is described in Somebody Somewhere: Breaking Free from the World of Autism and Like Colour to the Blind: Soul Searching and Soul Finding; and he appeared in television documentaries with her. On 9 December 2000, while living in England, Williams married Chris Samuel. In 2002, the couple moved to her native Australia. Williams and Samuel created the auties.org website, for people on the autistic spectrum who are seeking to work towards self-employment. Williams wrote about him in Everyday Heaven.

=== Cancer and death ===
Williams had a "strong family history of cancer". In 2011 she was diagnosed with breast cancer. The cancer, which was terminal, metastasized and "spread throughout the liver". She chose to spend her last days in palliative care. She urged her state premier to pass Dying with Dignity legislation. Williams died of the disease on 22 April 2017, aged 53.
