= Jacqui Jackson =

British writer

Jacqueline Carol Jackson is a British writer who consults, counsels, speaks and writes on most autism issues. Her doctoral thesis, Nurturing the Engagement of Children with an Autism Spectrum Disorder through Digital Polysensory Experiences, awarded by Coventry University, analysed the sensory differences of children with an ASD and the impact of the digital and built environment. Jackson consultants on the design of built environments and the impact of lighting and design on individuals with autism spectrum disorder and other neurodiversities.

Jackson is a single mother of eight children, three daughters and five sons, all of whom are neurodivergent with autism, ADHD among other conditions. Her son Luke has also written books about autism, including Freaks, Geeks, and Asperger Syndrome. Jackson and her family appeared in the BBC documentary My Family and Autism in 2004. A drama film called Magnificent 7 starring Helena Bonham Carter as Maggi, a character based on Jackson, aired on BBC Two in 2005. Jackson lives in Blackpool.

== Children ==
Jackson's children are:

- Matthew Richard (born 28 November 1983) was born prematurely and has dyslexia and dyspraxia.
- Rachel Louise (born 14 September 1985) has ADHD (although not officially diagnosed).
- Sarah Elizabeth (14 May 1987) has autism spectrum disorder.
- Luke Christopher (born 18 August 1988) has diagnoses of Asperger syndrome and dyspraxia.
- Anna Rebekah (born 8 June 1990) has ADHD.
- Joseph David "Joe" (born 29 May 1993) has ADHD and autism spectrum disorder.
- Ben Curtis (born 2 May 1997) was born prematurely, had a brain haemorrhage and is autistic.
- Izaac Noah (born 2 February 2009) has diagnoses of autism spectrum disorder and hypermobility.

== Books ==
- Multicoloured Mayhem, Jessica Kingsley Publishers, 2003, ISBN 1-84310-171-8
- Damned Hard Day: Living with AD/HD, Jessica Kingsley Publishers, 2005, ISBN 1-84310-296-X
