= Aspergirls =

2010 non-fiction book by Rudy Simone

- Empowering Females with Asperger Syndrome
- Author: Rudy Simone
- Language: English
- Publisher: Jessica Kingsley Publishers
- Publication date: 2010
- Publication place: United Kingdom
- Media type: Print (Paperback)
- Pages: 240
- ISBN: 978-1-84905-826-1

Aspergirls: Empowering Females with Asperger Syndrome is a non-fiction book written by American author Rudy Simone. It was published in 2010 by Jessica Kingsley Publishers. The book is about women and girls who have Asperger syndrome and their experiences. It was written to help girls and women who have been diagnosed with Asperger's.

== Background ==
Simone is a jazz musician as well as an author. She dealt with many symptoms as a child, but she did not realize that these were due to Asperger syndrome. These symptoms included acting out, moods changing quickly, and difficulty in understanding some forms of communication. Another difficulty of hers was making friends, and she still does not have a close female friend. She learned over time how to deal with other people.

The book was published when Simone was 47 years old, but she said that she never heard the word Asperger's until a few years prior. She decided to write the book because she was unable to find adequate material dealing with girls on the spectrum, and the word that would become its title, "Aspergirls", "just popped into [her] head". She noted, "There are many good things to be said about Aspergirls. We are highly intuitive. We have an incredible ability to concentrate and a work ethic which makes us employable in the right jobs."

The author is self-diagnosed as having Asperger syndrome, but for the book she only interviewed women who had been formally diagnosed. Simone said that even though boys and girls have the symptoms, it is expressed differently between the two genders.

Simone noted that she "felt different from [her] family" as a child, and that they "seemed unpredictable and frightening" to her. The effects of her Asperger's were so strong that "as puberty kicked in, I went through bouts of mutism which could last hours or even a whole day."

== Content ==
The book was written for girls and women with Asperger syndrome. It deals with a variety of issues that females on the spectrum face, such as the variety of relationships, employment, and depression. The more than thirty-five women with Aspergers interviewed for the book ranged in age from their 20s to their 50s. Many of them were not diagnosed until their children had been diagnosed, which had prompted doctors to check the parents. The women went through most of their lives not knowing what their problems were from. It was often believed by people they knew that they knew how to properly act, even though they did not. The women share their life stories and also give advice to readers on how to deal with their diagnosis. One of the women discusses the issue of marriage, saying, "My son's father and I live in the same house, are friends, but live separate lives largely due to my autism spectrum disorder (ASD). We live fairly happily, however."

The foreword was written by the author Liane Holliday Willey. Willey's foreword was republished in the publication Journal of Autism and Developmental Disorders. The book has a section titled Additional Tools for Parents which supports the acronym B.A.L.L.S. B stands for "believing the diagnosis", A for "accepting us for who we are", the first L for like, the second L for love, and S for support. The ending has an appendix that compares symptoms between girls and boys with the syndrome. Included within the book are references and sources to help people with Asperger syndrome or people who know someone with the syndrome.

== Reception ==
The Autism Society of Ohio said that the book is "essential reading" for females who have a diagnosis of Asperger syndrome or who think that they may have it. The review concludes with, "It will also be of interest to partners and loved ones of Aspergirls, and anybody interested either professionally or academically in Asperger's Syndrome."

Hazel Ratfliffe, writing for Learning Disability Today, said, "It is a beautiful intelligent, powerful book and it should be read by everyone." Kaavonia Hinton, writing for Foreword Magazine, gave a positive review, but also said, "While the voices of doctors and other experts would have strengthened the book, female readers will be encouraged to lead successful, fulfilled lives."

Shana Nichols, the author of Girls Growing Up on the Autism Spectrum, said that it is an "excellent read" as well as a "celebration of the culture of AS womanhood." Nichols also said that Simone writes with "passion, honesty and truth".

The book won a gold medal for the Sexuality/Relationships category in the 2011 IPPY Awards. It also had an honorary mention for the Women's Issues Category in the 2010 BOTYA Awards. It has been translated into Dutch, German, Japanese, Polish, and French.
