= Somebody Somewhere (book) =

Book by Donna Williams

- First edition
- Author: Donna Willams
- Genre: Autobiography
- Publisher: Doubleday
- Publication date: 1994
- Pages: 240
- ISBN: 0385404875
- OCLC: 42379687
- Preceded by: Nobody Nowhere
- Followed by: Like Colour To The Blind

Somebody Somewhere is a book written by the autistic author, songwriter, screenwriter and artist Donna Williams. It is the 1994 sequel to the bestseller Nobody Nowhere, which spent 15 weeks on the New York Times Bestseller List.

Somebody Somewhere takes up Williams' story after her diagnosis with autism at the age of 26 after a childhood often thought deaf, labelled psychotic, then disturbed. In this book, Williams becomes a teacher and goes on to work with children on the autistic spectrum before being thrust into the public eye upon the accidental publication of her first book.

Somebody Somewhere is the second in her autobiographical collection of four books. Later autobiographical works include the third book in the series, Like Colour To The Blind (1998), and the fourth autobiographical installment, Everyday Heaven (2004).
