= And the Dragons Do Come =

2025 memoir by Sim Butler

And the Dragons Do Come: Raising a Transgender Kid in Rural America
- Author: Sim Butler
- Language: English
- Genre: Memoir
- Published: 2025
- Publisher: The New Press
- Publication place: United States
- Pages: 224
- ISBN: 978-1-62097-904-4

And the Dragons Do Come: Raising a Transgender Kid in Rural America is a 2025 memoir by Sim Butler. It describes his experience as the father of a transgender girl who comes out in Birmingham, Alabama, and the "dragons" of their community that seek to hurt her and limit her rights. Although they feel supported by their extended family and Baptist church, they decide to move to another state to live in a safer community.

== Summary ==
Sim Butler's memoir discusses his family's experiences in Birmingham, Alabama, after his daughter comes out as transgender. Butler debates about what to call his daughter in the memoir, eventually giving her the pseudonym Kate.

As the memoir begins, Butler is an associate professor of communication at the University of Alabama. He assumes Kate, his oldest child, is a boy, but for years, she insists that she is a girl. Before her sixth birthday, she comes out to her parents by telling them "I am a girl in my heart". Butler and his wife had worried that Kate's self-expression was just a phase, but realize that she shows "insistent, consistent, and persistent" signs of her gender identity, along with self-harming behaviors and some behavioral challenges. That summer, Kate socially transitions, growing her hair out and wearing dresses, with her parents telling their family and friends about her gender. They feel accepted here and in their progressive Baptist church, but began encountering challenges after the summer, which Butler labels "dragons".

Upon returning to school, Kate has a teacher who decides to repeatedly deadname her, and she is later prevented from joining a coed swim team by a swim coach. Butler recounts how the family looks for supportive schools and supports their daughter as she changes her name and pronouns. They find supportive healthcare that helps Kate get healthier and happier. Butler also writes about the family's trips to the beach with their church, Kate's ninth-grade birthday party, and his past participation in an intramural soccer team in graduate school, following these experiences with arguments for the rights of transgender people. He includes research by medical associations, logic-based debate, and application of conservative and liberal ideologies to argue for the rights of transgender people.

Butler also describes the harassment inflicted on his family, including death threats and attacks. He describes the political challenges that have affected his family, including the participation of trans athletes in sports, their access to bathrooms, and their options for official I.D.s. When Alabama passes a law that removes Kate's access to medical care, banning gender-affirming care for minors, the family joins a lawsuit to fight it. Butler describes the ignorance of transphobic campaigners and his feeling of surrealism when the law banning gender-affirming care is passed in 2022. Eventually, the family moves out of Alabama for her safety. The family is unsure about the future, but Kate thrives in her new home.

== Development and themes ==
Sim Butler was motivated to write the memoir to support other families of trans kids who may be facing major challenges and safety issues where they live. He wanted those families to know that they weren't alone, and he wanted to share that trans people are everywhere, and they deserve to be safe everywhere. Butler described the metaphorical "dragons" of the book as "a manifestation of those dangerous, scary parts of life that make you feel helpless. For us, that was fighting the state of Alabama around health care." The effect of these dragons is to overwhelm and frighten, and Butler wanted to emphasize that people can find the needed allies and support to handle these challenges.

Catherine Doherty identifies several core arguments throughout the book: "rural America is not a monolith, transphobia is not inevitable, and advocacy does not solely occur in cities or on college campuses". Doherty says that the narrative is imbued with grief and persistence as Butler recounts how he tried to support and protect his daughter. He shows how transgender youth and their families face many hostilities and challenges in rural areas whose policies are set by conservatives. Butler also demonstrates the protective power of having multiple different communities support the family and how this can fuel trans liberation.

== Reception ==
Kathleen McBroom, reviewing for Booklist, praised the book as an honest and helpful account of a family's experiences of raising their transgender daughter in rural Alabama. McBroom described Kate's voice as "funny, intelligent, and endearing" and Butler's writing as a "convincing counterpart to sensationalized rhetoric". Anjelica Rufus, for Library Journal, concluded that the book was an "essential read and a welcome addition to parenting and social sciences collections", both for Butler's honesty in describing his experiences and his arguments against anti-trans legislation and transphobia. Publishers Weekly called the book a "moving glimpse of the struggle for trans kids' rights" and appreciated the book's mix of narrative and argument. Hannah Pearson, reviewing for Foreword, noted Butler's honesty in transcribing his anxiety and unease throughout his family's experiences, and his passionate and broadly-appealing arguments for trans rights.

In the journal Affilia: Feminist Inquiry in Social Work, Catherine Doherty praised the book's examination of trans childhood in rural America. Doherty agreed with the book's argument that trans children deserve to be safe everywhere, and its humanization of the challenges they and their families face in rural settings. Doherty thought that the book's account of parental and personal resilience in order to withstand hostile rural systems was a limited option for families, often inapplicable due to structural issues. However, Doherty praised the book as an explanation of life in rural America for readers from elsewhere, and as an educational resource for social workers and allies.
