= Both/And: Essays by Trans and Gender-Nonconforming Writers of Color =

2025 anthology edited by Denne Michele Norris

- Editor: Denne Michele Norris, Electric Literature
- Language: English
- Genre: Nonfiction
- Publisher: HarperOne
- Publication date: August 2025
- Publication place: U.S.
- Pages: 240
- ISBN: 978-0-06341-437-2

Both/And: Essays by Trans and Gender-Nonconforming Writers of Color is an anthology edited by Denne Michele Norris and Electric Literature, published in 2025 via HarperOne. It includes essays by authors and activists who are people of color that identify as trans or gender-nonconforming. The anthology is a finalist for the 2026 Lambda Literary Award for Transgender Nonfiction.

== Background ==
Denne Michele Norris began Both/And as an essay project at Electric Literature, a nonprofit online literary publisher where she served as editor-in-chief. She wanted to provide a platform for trans people of color to write about their community and experiences. One instigation happened in 2021 when Dave Chappelle released The Closer, a Netflix special with transphobic jokes that sparked controversy among LGBTQ+ activists and allies. Norris wrote that she was "infuriated" by Chappelle but even more upset by the media ecosystem that continually debated transgender people without including the voices of trans people, especially trans people of color. Norris felt that there were too few books published by trans authors, and those that were released were limited to narrow genres and experiences. She worried that trans people were the target of rising anti-LGBTQ legislation in the U.S. while not being able to share their own perspectives in the political and cultural sphere.

In 2024, Electric Literature announced that the series would be packaged into anthology format and published as the press's first book, including new essays. They explained that "Both/And will not seek to justify trans lives in a culture that remains hostile to their existence. This anthology will instead tell stories both intimate and expansive, gritty and messy, that honor trans self-determination in the face of obstacles that often seem insurmountable." In the book's introduction, Norris writes that storytelling is a powerful tool for empathy and understanding, and that increased political attacks on trans and gender-nonconforming people of color means that it is more important to share the writing of those communities. She states the vision of the book:

Historically, trans people have been forced to imagine, or conjure, representation of ourselves into existing narratives that never sought to include us, often using the stories and fictional lives of canonically cishet characters as foundations for possible trans stories. Both/And is unabashed in its portrayal of the fullness of our lives. These essays consider imagination and fantasy as real-world liberation, the heightened visibility and invisibility of trans bodies, trans joy, laughter and love, and trans rage, revenge, and loss.

== Contents ==
The book is introduced by its editor, Denne Michele Norris, and dedicated "For the gworls, the bois, and everyone in between and beyond." Its epigraph is a quote by Miss Major Griffin-Gracy: "I'm still fucking here!"

Both/And has 17 essays, organized into Selfhood, Desire, and Coming to Light.

Selfhood:

- Addie Tsai: "Object Lessons"
- Vanessa Angélica Villarreal: "Body Type 1"
- Miss Peppermint: "I'm Still Learning"
- Kai Cheng Thom: "Straining Toward Humanity"
- Jonah Wu: "Femininity Was the Knife I Wielded"
- Gabrielle Bellot: "The Goddess in the Volcano"

Desire:

- Akwaeke Emezi: "On Beauty"
- Meredith Talusan: "Trick"
- Denny: "Redemption Slayage"
- Edgar Gomez: "Speaking My Language"
- Tanaïs: "Becoming Femme"
- Autumn Fourkiller: "Lusus Deux"

Coming to Light:

- Raquel Willis: "All Power to the People"
- Caro De Robertis: "Gender Euphoria Is a Power Source"
- Zeyn Joukhadar: "An Incomplete History of Trans Immortality"
- Kaia Ball: "In My Worst Nightmares, My Father Transitions"
- A. L. Major: "Futures"

== Publication ==
For the initial series, Electric Literature sought to sponsor essays by a dozen trans and gender-nonconforming writers of color, at $500 a piece. The essays would be edited by a trans writer of color and shared via Electric Literature's site. After a week of fundraising, the press was able to publish fifteen essays for the Both/And series in 2023. Writers for the original online series included 12:41, H.P. Cilgin, Summer Tao, Ching-In Chen, Fayth Tan, Stacy Nathaniel Jackson, M Jesuthasan, Leo D. Martinez, Logan Hoffman-Smith, and Addie Tsai.

In 2024, the site announced that some stories from the published series, along with many new essays, would be collected into book format. The anthology was edited by Denne Michele Norris and published with HarperOne. Both/And: Essays by Trans and Gender-Nonconforming Writers of Color was published in August 2025.

== Reception ==
Both/And is a finalist for the 2026 Lambda Literary Award for Transgender Nonfiction.

The anthology received a starred review from Publishers Weekly, which praised the collection's hopeful message, calls to activism, and examination of the experiences of trans people of color. James Factora praised the book's unfiltered essays written by influential trans writers of color, listing it in them's 32 Best LGBTQ+ Books of 2025. Reginald Harris of The Gay & Lesbian Review also recommended the anthology for readers wanting to "understand the inner lives and hopes of trans and gender-nonconforming people". Harris considered the book's strongest narratives to include Vanessa Angélica Villareal's and Meredith Talusan's. Laura Moreno, for The Bay Area Reporter, recommended the book for people wanting to understand trans experiences and perspectives, as well as for readers who enjoy contemporary fiction. Moreno deemed Norris a "vital voice on the national stage" for her release of Both/And along with her debut novel, When the Harvest Comes, in the same year.

Violet Pandya praised the collection for the Ms. Feminist Know-It-All August 2025 reading list. Rebecca Foster, for Shelf Awareness, praised the imagination and examples of activism and art portrayed throughout the book's essays. Foster concluded: "these vibrant essays blend the personal and the political in fascinating ways, tracing shifting identities and standing up for artistic expression." Dave Wheeler of Shelf Awareness compared the anthology's visions of the future to the art presented in gendertrash from hell, which was also published in book format in 2025.

== See also ==
- This Bridge Called My Back
- Meanwhile, Elsewhere
- Gender Outlaws: The Next Generation
- Home Girls
