= Uncanny Valley Girls =

2025 book by Zefyr Lisowski

- Author: Zefyr Lisowski
- Genre: Film criticism, Memoir, Transgender literature
- Publisher: Harper Perennial
- Publication date: October 2025
- Pages: 240
- ISBN: 978-0-06-341397-9

Uncanny Valley Girls: Essays on Horror, Survival, and Love is a 2025 book of essays by Zefyr Lisowski, including elements of memoir and horror movie criticism. It was a finalist for the 2026 Lambda Literary Award for Transgender Nonfiction and the Leslie Feinberg Award.

== Contents ==
The book has three sections that explore Zefyr Lisowski's life alongside analysis of different horror films. Lisowski discusses her experience with love, grief and survival. She writes about institutionalization and mental health; her relationship to the North Carolina town she grew up with and the broader South; her experiences with love and relationships, queerness and transness; militarism, criticism, and religion. Film criticism centers on The Ring, The Texas Chainsaw Massacre, and The Wolf Girl, although Scream, Pet Cemetery, Black Swan, and Antichrist are also included. She also writes about Greer Lankton, a trans artist who created life-size dolls, and Nell Cropsey, a girl who was murdered in her hometown and turned into a local legend. The book ends with a discussion of care, for one's self and for others.

== Creation ==
In a piece for Writer's Digest, Lisowski explains that she wrote Uncanny Valley Girls about love through the lens of her relationship to horror movies, and felt able to write about these truths due to her literary foundations and inspirations. She says she could not have survived her childhood–"trans, queer, and disabled in the rural South"–without books. As she wrote this book, she wanted to think through her experience with pain and constructing a life in spite of it. She used both memoir and criticism to write about survival, saying: "it’s only through both, after all, that I was able to see my life in its full, shining wholeness. It’s only through both that I was able to break open my own world just a little, that I was able to live."

Lisowski cites feminist and queer critiques of the horror genre as influences. Explicit references include Powers of Horror by Julia Kristeva, "A Glossary of Haunting", by Eve Tuck and C. Ree, and work by Willow Catelyn Maclay. Implicit influences include Men, Women, and Chainsaws by Carol J. Clover and Skin Shows: Gothic Horror and the Technology of Monsters by Jack Halberstam. She was also influenced by authors who had written about their experiences after violence, including Audre Lorde, Melissa Febos, Johanna Hedva, and Elissa Washuta.

== Reception ==
Uncanny Valley Girls was a finalist for the 2026 Lambda Literary Award for Transgender Nonfiction. It was also a finalist for the 2026 Leslie Feinberg Award for Trans and Gender-Variant Literature.

Publishers Weekly gave Uncanny Valley Girls a starred review, praising its prose, honesty, and power. August Owens Grimm praised the collection for Hippocampus Magazine, admiring Lisowski's storytelling, imagery, and honesty about tough themes. Grimm appreciated the book's conclusion, which centered on acts of care rather than trite healing narratives. Mia Rhee, for the Chicago Review of Books, wrote that "reading Uncanny Valley Girls is like wading into water without fishing, but pulling up line after line of transcribed narrative intermixed with the author’s lived experience, contextualized by popular culture, until you are left holding a beautiful tangle of words racing straight to the core of feeling".

Ana Hein, for The Rumpus, compares the work's personal reflections on horror to those of Night Rooms by Gina Nutt, With Bloom Upon Them and Also With Blood by Justin Phillip Reed, and Blue Light of the Screen by Claire Cronin. However, Hein says that Uncanny Valley Girls is singular in its analysis of how love and relationships shape the experience of horror.
