= Like Colour to the Blind =

Book by Donna Williams

- First edition
- Author: Donna Willams
- Genre: Autobiography
- Publisher: Doubleday
- Publication date: 1996
- Pages: 340
- ISBN: 978-1-85302-720-8
- OCLC: 42379583
- Preceded by: Somebody Somewhere
- Followed by: Everyday Heaven

Like Colour To The Blind (1996) is the third in a series of four autobiographical works by internationally bestselling autistic author Donna Williams.

The book relates Williams' diagnosis with scotopic sensitivity syndrome, and her experience with tinted lenses on her visual perceptual disorders including visual fragmentation, context blindness, face blindness, and loss of depth perception. This led to a wide social awakening to visual perceptual disorders in people on the autistic spectrum.
