= Electric Literature =

American literary magazine

- Categories: Literary magazine
- Frequency: Daily
- Format: Digital
- Total circulation: 5 million
- Founder: Andy Hunter and Scott Lindenbaum
- Founded: 2009; 17 years ago
- Company: Electric Literature
- Country: United States
- Based in: New York
- Language: English
- Website: electricliterature.com
- ISSN: 2152-0933

Electric Literature is an American literary magazine.

== History ==
Founded by Andy Hunter and Scott Lindenbaum in 2009 as a print quarterly journal, Electric Literature transitioned to a daily website in 2012 under the helm of Halimah Marcus and Benjamin Samuel.

Electric Literature publishes essays, reading lists, interviews, fiction, poetry, graphic narratives, humor, and book news, all available to read online for free without a paywall. It launched the first fiction magazine on the iPhone and iPad. Work published has been recognized by Best American Short Stories, Essays, Poetry, and Comics, the Pushcart Prize, Best Canadian Short Stories, The Best of the Small Presses, and the O. Henry Prize.

in 2014, Electric Literature became a registered non-profit.

In 2016, Halimah Marcus was appointed the first executive director of Electric Literature. She has been with the magazine since 2010.

In 2021, Denne Michele Norris became editor-in-chief of Electric Literature, the first Black and openly trans editor-in-chief of a major U.S. literary publication.

In 2022, Electric Literature was the Digital Prize Winner of the Whiting Literary Magazine Prizes.

In 2023, Electric Literature partnered with Banned Books USA to offer free banned and challenged books to residents of Florida.

In 2025, Electric Literature published their first book, edited by Norris and published by HarperOne: Both/And: Essays by Trans and Gender-Nonconforming Writers of Color. It builds on a prior essay series that Electric Literature sponsored for trans writers of color. Both/And became a finalist for the 2026 Lambda Literary Award for Transgender Nonfiction.

== Recommended reading ==
Recommended Reading
- Website type: Fiction literary magazine
- Founder: Electric Literature
- Key people: Halimah Marcus and Bejamin Samuel
- Website: electricliterature.com/category/lit-mags/recommended-reading/
- Launched: May 2012; 14 years ago

In May 2012, Electric Literature launched Recommended Reading, a weekly fiction magazine. Each issue is curated by a well known editor or writer.

== The Commuter ==
The Commuter
- Website type: Poetry literary magazine
- Founder: Electric Literature
- Key people: Kelly Luce
- Website: electricliterature.com/category/lit-mags/the-commuter/
- Launched: January 2018; 8 years ago

The Commuter, a weekly magazine for poetry, flash, graphic, or experimental narrative, debuted in January 2018, helmed by writer Kelly Luce.
