= Rudy Simone =

American author

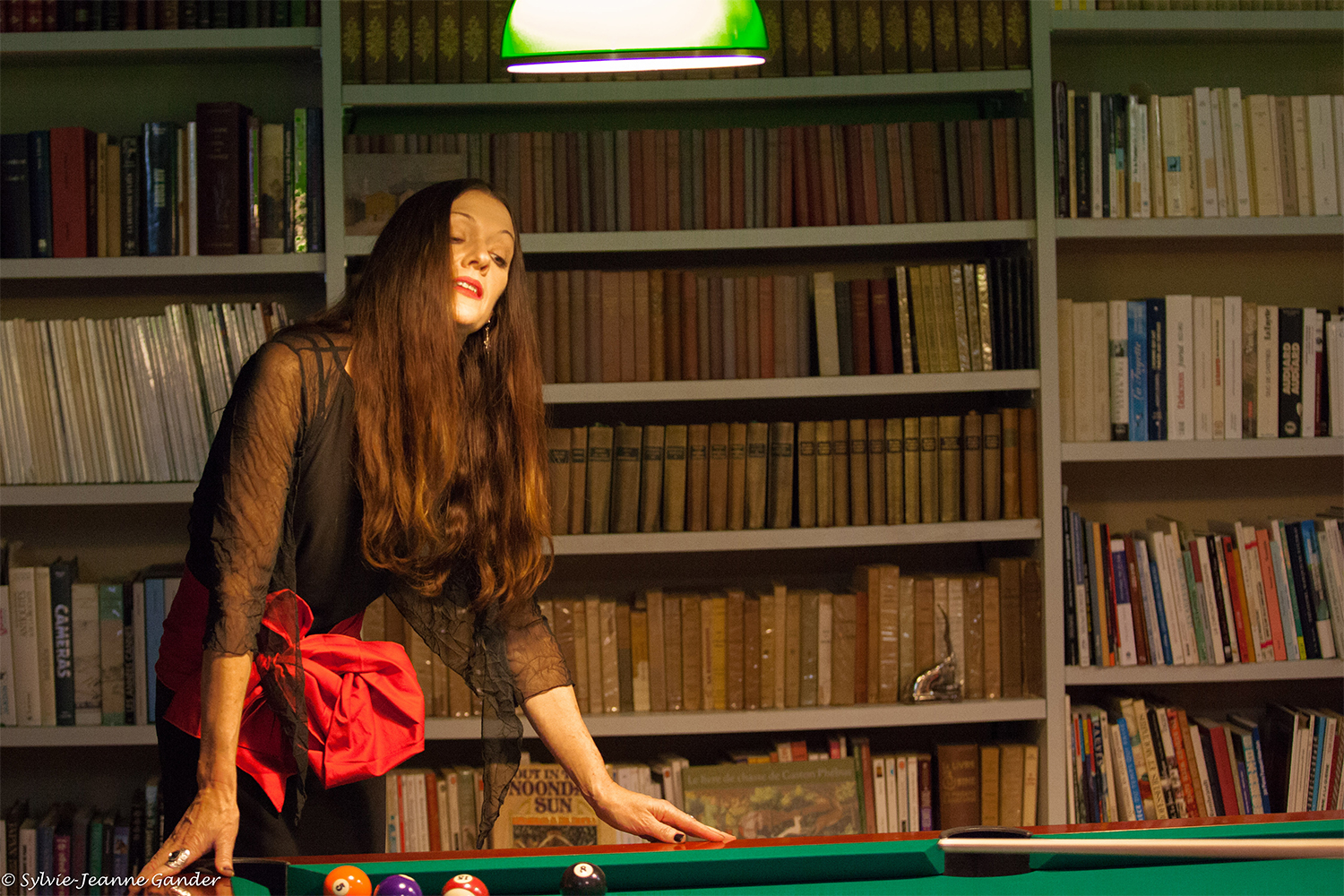
- Rudy Simone
- Occupation: Author
- Writing career
- Subjects: Asperger's Syndrome and Autism
- Notable work: Aspergirls: Empowering Females with Asperger's Syndrome
- Notable awards: Gold Award from the Independent Publishers Group, Gold Award from The Foreword Review

Rudy Simone (aka Artemisia) is an American author of books on Asperger's Syndrome and autism.

== Self-identification and Diagnosis ==
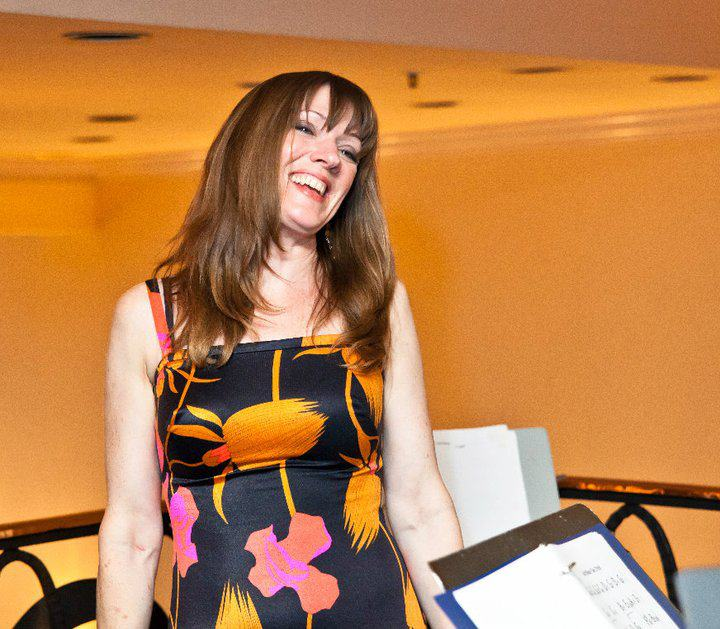
Simone in 2012

In 2011 Simone told Time Magazine that she initially self diagnosed with Aspergers after failing to find a doctor within 500 miles of where she lived who would believe her. However, in 2013 she received an official diagnosis and has posted the document publicly.

== Awards ==
Aspergirls won a Gold Award from the Independent Publishers Group in 2011, and Asperger's on the Job won a Gold Award from the ForeWord Review in 2010,

== Published books ==
Her books have been translated into several languages.

- 22 Things a Woman Must Know if She loves a Man with Asperger's Syndrome (Jessica Kingsley Publishers, 2009) ISBN 978-1-84905-803-2
- 22 Things A Woman with Asperger's Wants her Partner to Know (Jessica Kingsley Publisher, 2012) ISBN 978-1-84905-883-4
- Asperger's on the Job Must-have Advice for People with Asperger's or High Functioning Autism, and their Employers, Educators, and Advocates (Future Horizons Publishing, 2010) ISBN 1935274090
- Aspergirls: Empowering Females with Asperger's Syndrome (Jessica Kingsley Publishers, 2010) ISBN 978-1-84905-826-1
- The A-Z of ASDs: Aunt Aspie’s Guide to Life (Jessica Kingsley Publishers, 2016)
- Sex and the Single Aspie (Jessica Kingsley, 2018) written under the name Artemisia ISBN 978-1-78592-530-6
