= When the Harvest Comes =

2025 novel by Denne Michele Norris

When the Harvest Comes: A Novel
- Author: Denne Michele Norris
- Language: English
- Genre: Literary fiction
- Publisher: Random House
- Publication date: April 15, 2025
- Publication place: U.S.
- Pages: 304

When the Harvest Comes: A Novel is the 2025 debut novel of American writer and editor Denne Michele Norris.

== Plot ==
The novel begins with preparation for the marriage of Davis Freeman, a Black, femme violist, and his partner Everett Caldwell, a white, bisexual asset manager. Davis loves Everett intensely but also feels anxious about their relationship, feeling undeserving of a happy future together. Everett's family is wealthy, loud and close, and Davis does not feel very comfortable with them as they all meet at the family's Montauk beach house for the wedding. Davis is not close with his own family: he ran away from home at 18 and cut off contact with his abusive father, a Baptist minister called the Reverend. Since then, Davis lost most contact with his sister Olivia as well.

Davis is happily surprised to see Olivia show up to his wedding, but during the wedding reception, she tells him that their father has been hurt in a major car accident. Davis does not attend the Reverend's funeral after he dies. Over the following months, Davis's grief and past trauma causes him to withdraw from Everett and focus on music. Everett's anxiety builds as he finds that he cannot connect with Davis or comfort him. Their physical connection languishes and Everett is not sure whether they will reconnect. Everett and Davis both question stories about themselves and their families, from Davis's gender expression and identity, to Everett's acceptance by his family. They and their families slowly learn more about themselves and become closer to the people they can be their fullest selves with.

== Creation ==
Denne Michele Norris began writing the novel when she was 25, attending an MFA at Sarah Lawrence. A month into the program, her father died suddenly, and writing was part of processing her grief and staying connected to his memory. She showed part of the draft to an agent in 2012, thinking it could take five years to finish, but it eventually took 14. During this period, she published short fiction and became Electric Literature's editor-in-chief, becoming the first openly trans, Black woman to run a major literary publication.

In all versions of the novel, Davis and Everett's love remained the center of the story, with Davis pulling away from his seemingly perfect partner as he processes his relationship with his father. However, the professional choices and success of the characters, the chronology and layout of different points of view, and the status of their relationship changed throughout the story's development. Norris did not write the story in the order that readers would encounter it, and she spent a lot of time with editors moving segments of the narrative to create the desired emotional impact.

Norris wrote Davis as a viola player because the instrument faces physical constraints that have not been engineered away like other string instruments. Norris describes this as "a metaphor for Davis’s journey through the novel: a certain incongruousness with his body." Norris played the viola seriously for many years and had always met the most Black and queer orchestral musicians among other violists, wondering at the connection between marginalized groups and a sidelined instrument.

== Publication ==
Norris wrote and edited the novel for 14 years. By 2017, she had finished a first draft after finding time to write during residencies, and she sold the manuscript in 2022. The book was published in 2025, and Norris felt that kindness and empathy were devalued in that time's politics, so she hoped the novel would help affirm and nurture people's humanity.

Emily Mahon designed the book's cover to reflect the story's portrayal of Davis's fluidity and celebration, even after childhood trauma. When Norris saw the cover, she felt that her most vulnerable self had been shown, recalling an intense memory of dancing on a beach at night and feeling self-acceptance.

=== Influences ===
Norris cited writers of traditional styles of storytelling like James Baldwin, Toni Morrison, James Salter, and Joan Didion as major early influences. She felt her novel was deeply rooted in the Midwest, even as it mostly took place in the Northeast, and credited Elizabeth Strout with enabling her to write with specific regionality in that way. Laura Moreno, reviewing for the Bay Area Reporter, found When the Harvest Comes to be "vaguely reminiscent of the introspective writing" of Strout.

== Reception ==
James Factora praised When the Harvest Comes as one of them's list of 32 best LGBTQ+ books of 2025. For Elle, Keely Weiss named the novel one of 2025's best queer books. Publishers Weekly gave the novel a starred review, praising the book's climax and its emotional characterization. Kirkus Reviews disliked how much emotion was processed through the novel, stating that it was too melodramatic and cliched. Nic Anstett, listing the book in an Autostraddle article of outstanding trans novels of the first half of 2025, labeled the book a cathartic read. Anstett opined that its protagonists are portrayed tenderly as they deal with heavy issues. Similarly, Bookpage's Laura Sackton found that the novel was tender and triumphant. Sackton thought the transitions between points of view were sometimes distracting, but praised the book's portrayal of Davis and Everett's love. Laura Moreno, for The Bay Area Reporter, also praised the love story and the relatable and authentic description of American experiences of being Black and trans. Moreno also praised an anthology Norris edited and published in 2025: Both/And: Essays by Trans and Gender-Nonconforming Writers of Color. For Norris's work with both books, Moreno named her a "vital voice on the national stage".
