= George Masa =

Japanese-American photographer (c.1881 – 1933)

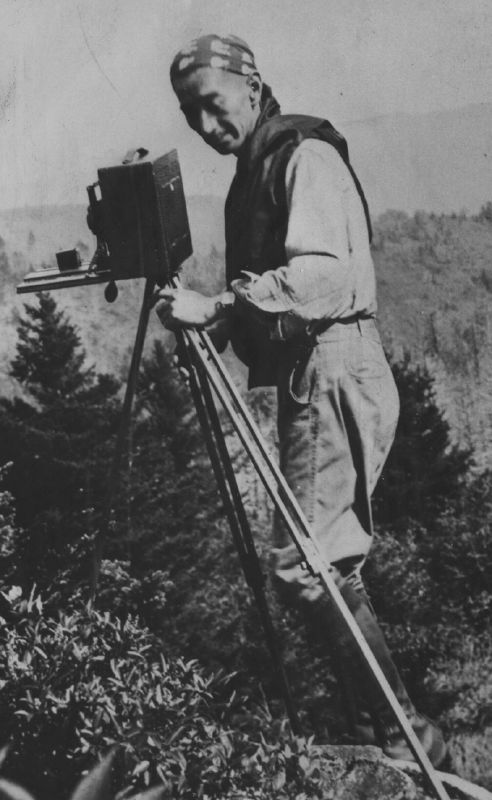
- Masa in 1931
- Born: Takahashi; April 6, 1885; Tokyo, Japan
- Died: June 21, 1933 (aged 48)
- Burial place: Riverside Cemetery (Asheville, North Carolina)
- Other names: Shoji Endo, George Iizuka
- Occupations: Businessman; Photographer

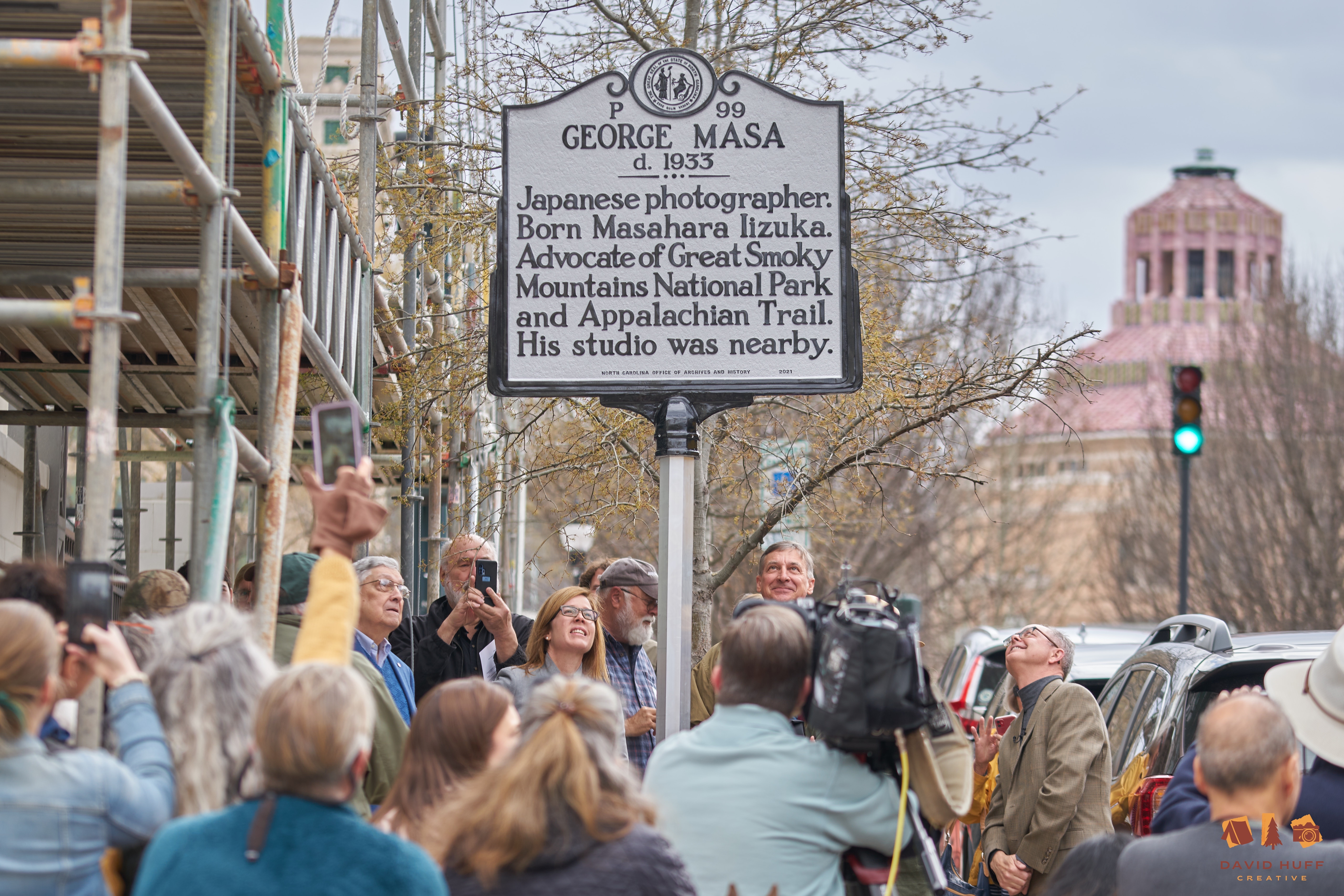
Masa Marker Dedication April 8, 2022

George Masa (1885 – 1933) was a Japanese photographer and advocate for the creation of the Great Smoky Mountains National Park and Appalachian Trail.

Born in Tokyo and raised with the name Shoji Endo, he moved to Asheville and was known variously as G. M Iizuka, George M. Iizuka, Masahara Iizuka, etc. before adopting George Masa as his professional name. Masa lived and worked in the United States as a businessman and professional photographer. His photographs of the mountains “played a large role” in the creation of the Great Smoky Mountains National Park. In 2018 Masa was inducted into the Appalachian Trail Hall of Fame in recognition of his mapping and trail work on behalf of the Appalachian Trail.

== Early life ==
The man we know today as George Masa was born in Tokyo on April 6, 1885, the second son of Mr. Takahashi, a Tokyo landlord. According to letters written in Japanese and found after Masa's death, he had an unhappy childhood. His mother died of complications related to childbirth and the infant was raised by an aunt. When he was three, he was adopted by a relative, Yasushi Endo, who was a prominent lawyer in Shizuoka, Japan. Shoji Endo graduated from Shizuoka Middle School in 1904 where he was a member of the Ryodo Club, a school group focused on sports and literature.

Endo initially emigrated in December 1904 but was turned away at the port of San Francisco because of trachoma, a contagious eye infection. He tried again in 1906 and succeeded. For the next nine years he lived on the west coast in Seattle, WA and Portland, OR, juggling various jobs (e.g. journalist, bathhouse operator, etc.) while also playing baseball. He was given the nickname, Yam or Yama for his love of mountains and mountain climbing. He married Tsuru Iizuka in 1914, taking her surname. No further information about Tsuru has been uncovered.

== Life in Asheville ==
Endo left the west coast in 1915, working for a short time in New Orleans before arriving in Asheville, North Carolina in July 1915.

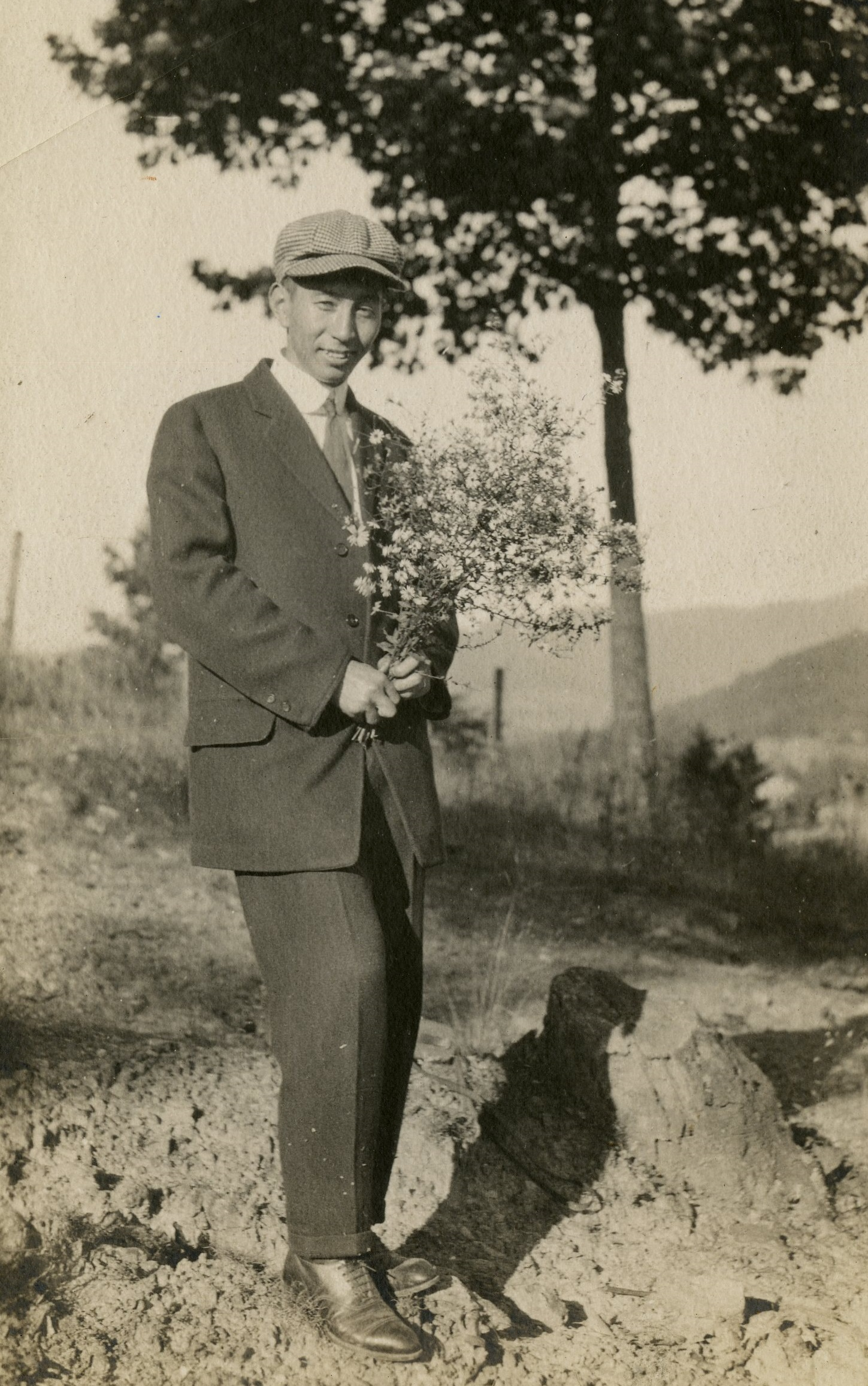
George Masa in North Carolina, date unknown

After initially working at the Grove Park Inn in the laundry room and as a valet; he began developing film for the wealthy hotel guests. Masa left the Inn to take a new position but his departure sparked suspicion from his boss Fred Loring Seely who reported Masa to the Bureau of Investigation (later named the Federal Bureau of Investigation). In 1918, he was hired by Asheville photographer Herbert Pelton where Masa continued his Kodak finishing business and “learned so many things [in] all branches of photography. He left Pelton the following year, opening his own business, Plateau Studio, and began using George Masa as his professional name.

In 1921 Masa was targeted by the Ku Klux Klan. For two weeks, the Asheville Citizen covered the ensuing case against Masa. The unsettled social conditions in the early 1920s made Asheville fertile ground for the resurgent Klan, argues historian Kevin W. Young.

For the next twelve years, Masa operated a photography studio in Asheville, with various business partners and under a series of names (e.g. A. B. Photo, Asheville Photo, etc.) His customers included some of the town's most affluent citizens such as the Vanderbilt, Grove, and Seely families as well as the architect Douglas Ellington and the artist William Waldo Dodge, Jr. Angelyn Whitmeyer has compiled a database of Masa print photographs along with photo description pages. Masa also worked in motion-picture cinematography, including silent films, newsreels, and syndicated series, including Ripley's Believe It or Not. Masa was the first to film a Cherokee Fair; the first to “shoot a set” at the Vanderbilt estate.

== Photographer and booster of western North Carolina ==
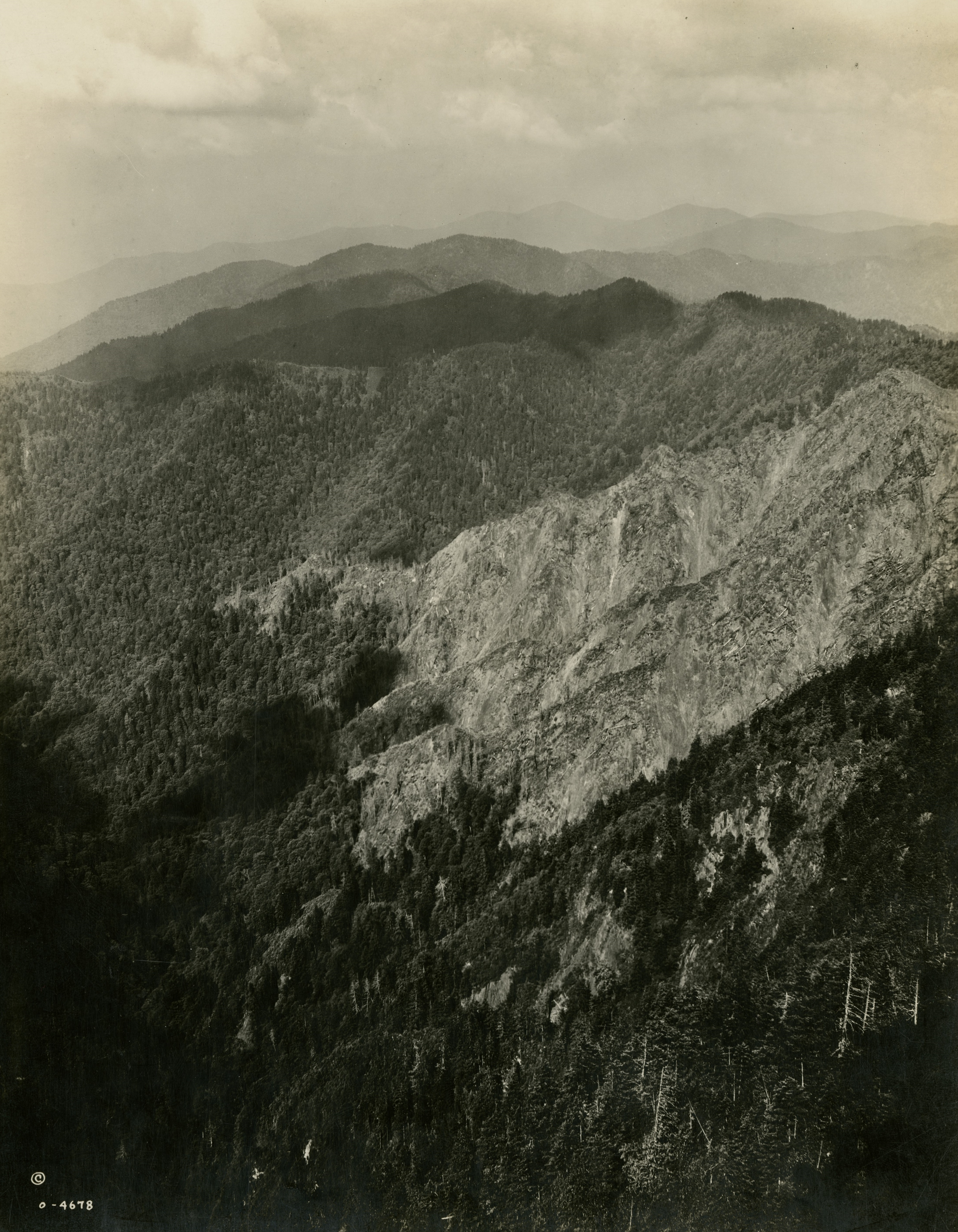
View of the Jump Off, Great Smoky Mountains National Park. Photograph by George Masa, circa 1930s.

Masa came to love the mountains of western North Carolina and advocated for their preservation, often at his own expense. He was a friend of Horace Kephart, and the two of them worked together to ensure that a large portion of the Great Smoky Mountains would be established as a national park. Arno Cammerer who became the 3rd director of the National Park Service wrote that Masa was the “best mountaineer on the North Carolina side.” Using his photographic equipment and an odometer he crafted from an old bicycle, Masa was an important contributor to the North Carolina Nomenclature Committee charged with confirming and establishing names of peaks, creeks, and geographical features within the borders of the proposed national park and then reconciling names along the state border with the Tennessee group. Masa also scouted and marked a significant portion of the Appalachian Trail through the Smokies. Kephart wrote that all of Masa's work exploring, mapping, and photographing were done “out of sheer loyalty to the park idea and a fine sense of scenic values.” His maps and his trail work were lauded by Appalachian Trail leader Myron Avery; his photographs sent to the governors of North Carolina and Tennessee and to First Lady Grace Coolidge.

Masa and the writer George McCoy published A Guide to the Great Smoky Mountains National Park in 1933. The guidebook featured a welcome message from Horace Albright, director of the National Park Service, who wrote “George Masa, its co-author, knows and loves the region well. Those fortunate enough to have gone into the woods with him know that any guide-book he may issue will be invaluable.”

== Death and legacy ==
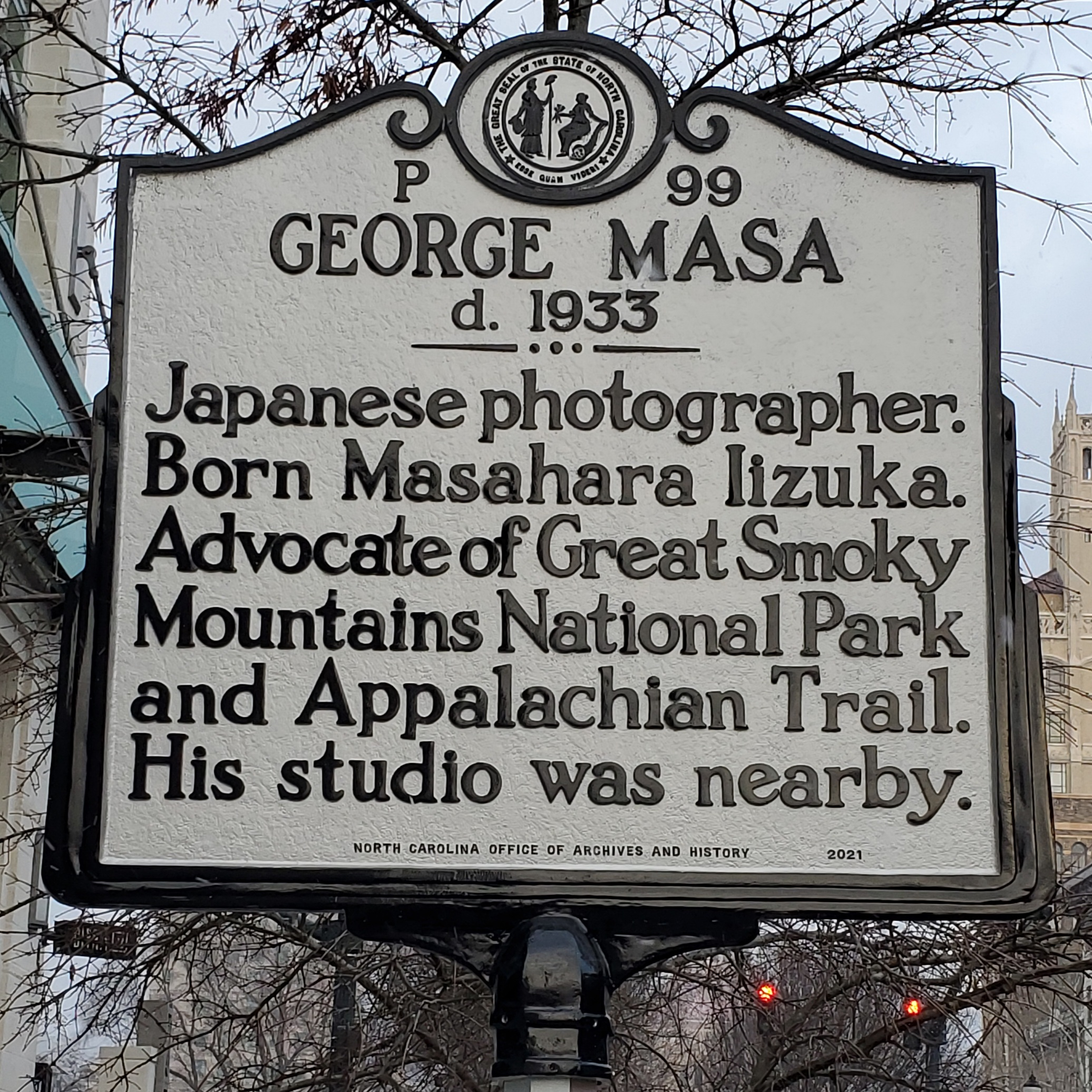
A historic marker for Masa in Asheville, North Carolina. The marker was installed before Masa's correct birth name was known.

Masa died in 1933 from tuberculosis. Members of the Carolina Mountain Club covered the arrangements and costs for Masa's casket, funeral, and burial in Asheville's Riverside Cemetery. Friends hoped to reinter Masa's body, along with Kephart's, in the national park “if arrangements with authorities can be made.” The request was denied and on Jan. 3, 1940 Cammerer clarified the policy related to park burials in an official memorandum. Several years later, the Club arranged for a simple marker at Masa's gravesite.

One year after Masa's death, the Great Smoky Mountains National Park was officially established. In 1961, Masa Knob, a peak of 5,685 feet in the Great Smoky Mountains National Park, was named in Masa's honor. It stands, appropriately, adjacent to Mount Kephart.

Interest in Masa's life was revived by documentary filmmakers more than 60 years after his death. Bonesteel Films released a 90-minute documentary about George Masa in 2003. Also, the fourth episode of Ken Burns's documentary about "The National Parks: America's Best Idea" features Masa (entitled "Going Home," covering the period between 1920 and 1933), which was initially broadcast on September 30, 2009.

In September 2024, Smokies Life published George Masa: A Life Reimagined, a comprehensive biography written by Janet McCue and Paul Bonesteel. After conducting groundbreaking research in the US and Japan, McCue and Bonesteel tell the fascinating story of an immigrant who endured scrutiny from the Bureau of Investigation, harassment from the Ku Klux Klan, and the collapse of the economy, his business, and his health—all while making it his life's goal to champion conservation in Southern Appalachia. Bonesteel has directed two documentary films about Masa: Mystery of George Masa (2003) and George Masa: A Life Reimagined (2025).

Masa's photographs and negatives are held in collections including Buncombe County Special Collections at Pack Memorial Library, Western Carolina University Special Collections, Special Collections and University Archives at UNC Asheville's Ramsey Library, and the Highlands Historical Society. The George Masa Photograph Database, aggregating known Masa photographs was compiled in 2024 by Angelyn Whitmeyer. Another Asheville photographer, Elliot Lyman Fisher, purchased thousands of Masa's negatives after his death, sold some under his own name, and then moved to Florida. As of 2025 these negatives have not been found.

== See also ==
- Issei

== Other references ==
- Duncan, Dayton and Ken Burns. (2009). The National Parks: America's Best Idea. New York: Alfred A. Knopf. ISBN 978-0-307-26896-9; OCLC 290466894. Two useful biographical vignettes of Masa are William A. Hart's "George Masa: The Best Mountaineer," in Robert S. Brunk (Editor), May We All Remember Well," Volume I, pages 249–75 and Jim Casada, "George Masa: Musings on a Man of Myster," Smoky Mountain Living," Fall, 2001, pages 67–70.
