= Grounded: The Case for Abolishing the United States Air Force =

- Author: Robert Farley
- Language: English
- Publisher: University Press of Kentucky
- Publication date: 2014
- ISBN: 978-0-8131-4495-5 (first edition, hardcover)
- Dewey Decimal: 358.4168670973
- LC Class: UG633 .F35

Grounded: The Case for Abolishing the United States Air Force is a 2014 nonfiction book by Robert Farley, published by University Press of Kentucky. The book argues that the United States Air Force (USAF) missions should be distributed as organic to other military forces, specifically the "other" air forces: Army, Navy, Marines, Coast Guard, and CIA, and the Air Force be disestablished as a separate component of the United States Department of Defense.

Farley was a University of Kentucky professor at the time of publishing. He was awarded a Ph.D. in political science at the University of Washington in 2004.

== Reactions ==
An American Enterprise Institute scholar wrote that the book was flawed by not recognizing the strategic bombing or space and missile missions of the Air Force, calling them "indispensable capabilities that neither the Army nor the Navy can or will replicate", with the book and the particular critique both predating the 2019 foundation of the United States Space Force. A USAF Air University official wrote that assigning capabilities to organic support would lose currently existing global capabilities and result in a "territorial air [force] tied to national ground units" such as that of the Royal Canadian Air Force.
