= Grove Park Historic District =

Historic house in North Carolina, United States

- U.S. National Register of Historic Places
- U.S. Historic district
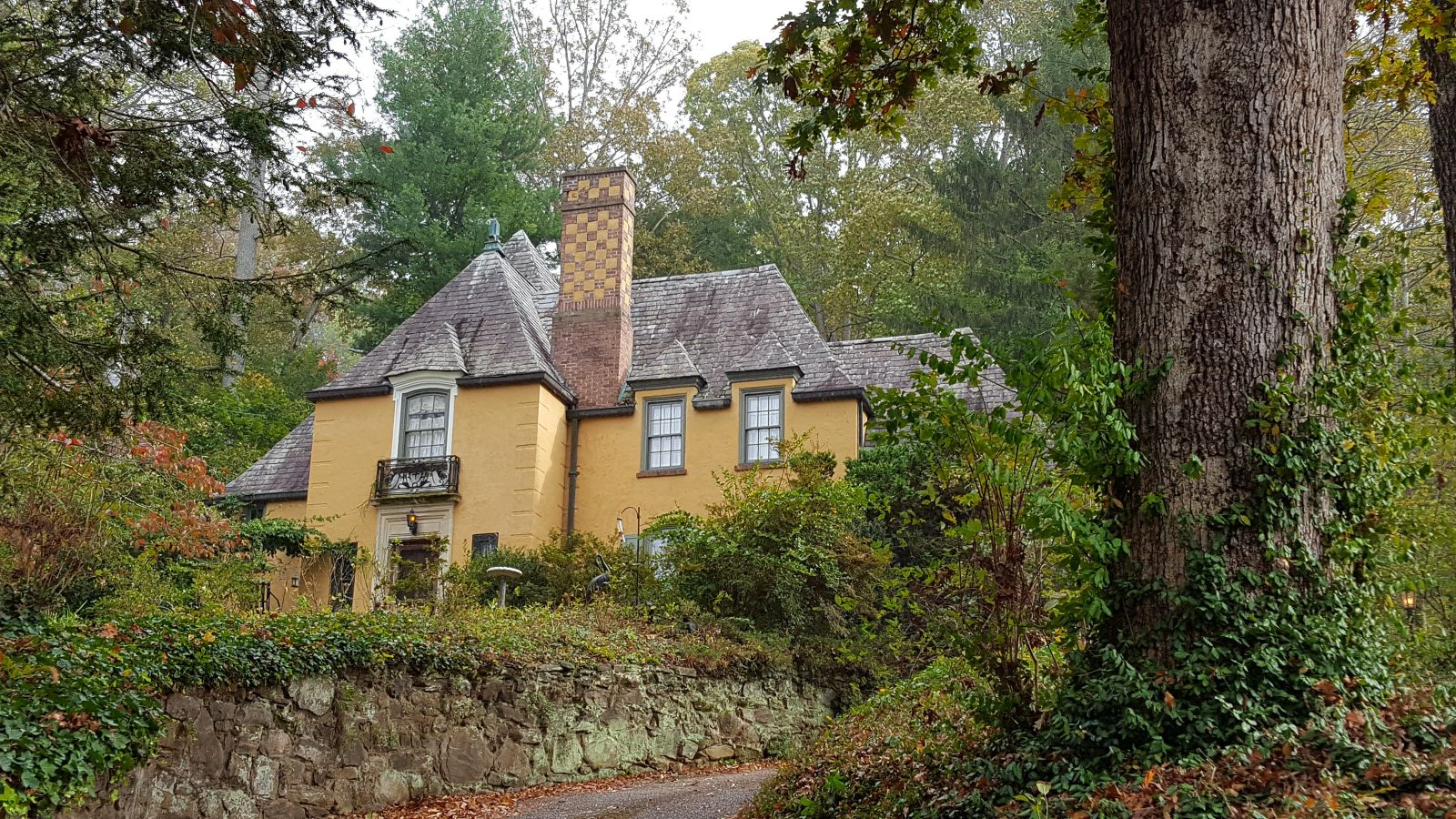
- Dr. Lewie Muller Griffith House, 2021

- Location within North Carolina Location within the United States
- Location: Roughly bounded by Evelyn Pl., Macon Ave., Howland Rd., Woodland Rd., Canterbury Ln., Charlotte St., and Murdock Ave.; also roughly Kimberly Ave. from Maywood St. to north of Evelyn Pl., including Grove Park Inn Country Club, Asheville, North Carolina
- Coordinates: 35°36′38″N 82°32′45″W
- Area: 232 acres (94 ha)
- Built: 1908-1913, 1914
- Architect: Grove, Edwin Wiley; Beadle, Chauncey
- Architectural style: Colonial Revival, Bungalow/craftsman, Tudor Revival
- NRHP reference No.: 89000247, 90001918 (Boundary Increase)
- Added to NRHP: April 13, 1989, December 18, 1990 (Boundary Increase)

Grove Park Historic District is a national historic district located at Asheville, Buncombe County, North Carolina. The district encompasses 290 contributing buildings and 1 contributing site in a predominantly residential section Asheville. The planned suburban community was originally platted and developed in 1908-1913 and 1914. It includes representative examples of Colonial Revival, Tudor Revival, and Bungalow style dwellings. The community was laid out by noted landscape architect Chauncey Beadle. The Kimberly Amendment to Grove Park was an expansion made to the original Grove Park development in 1923. It includes the former Asheville Country Club, now the Grove Park Inn Country Club.

It was listed on the National Register of Historic Places in 1989, with a boundary increase in 1990.

== Gallery ==
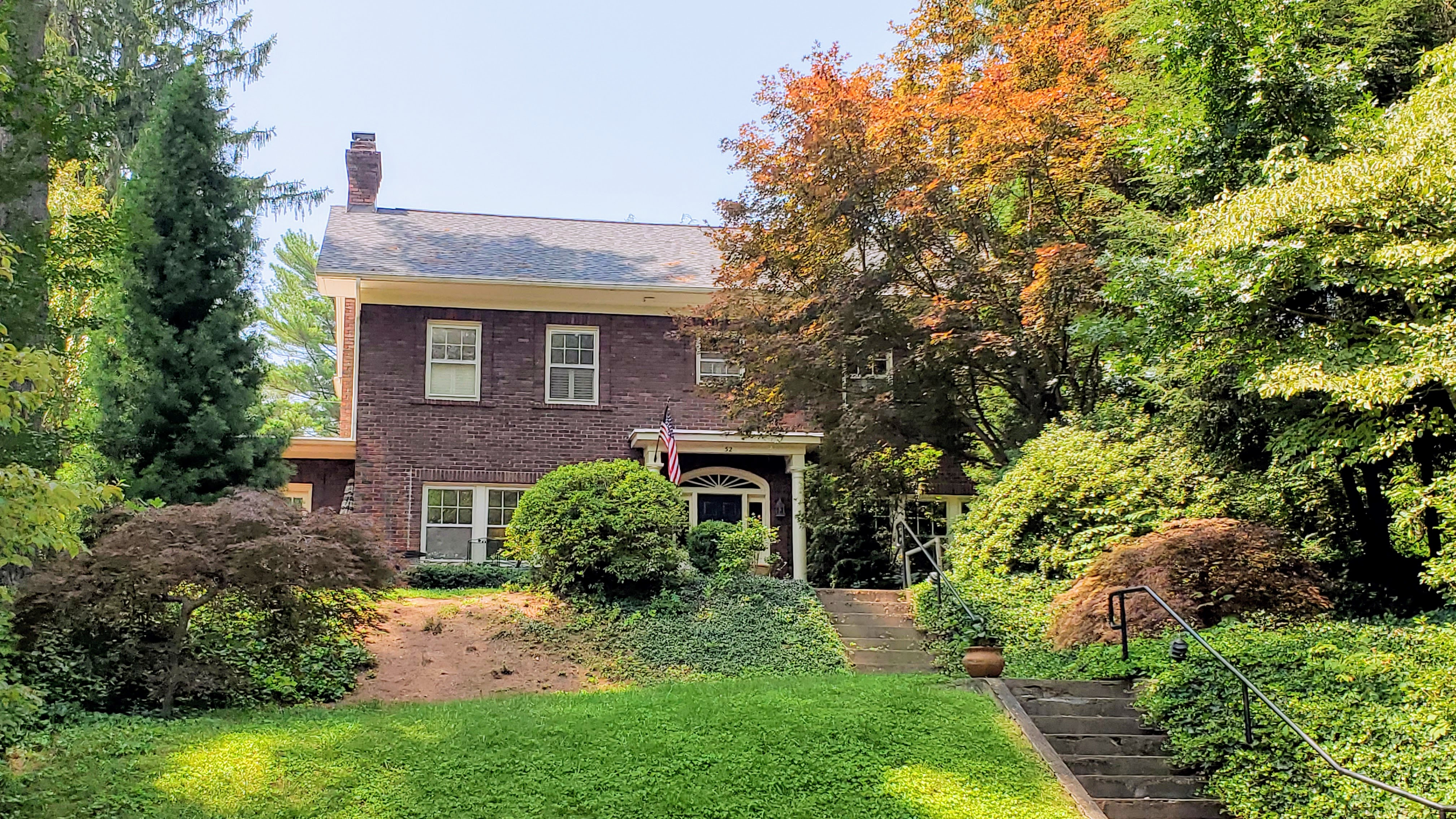
52 Sunset Parkway, 2021

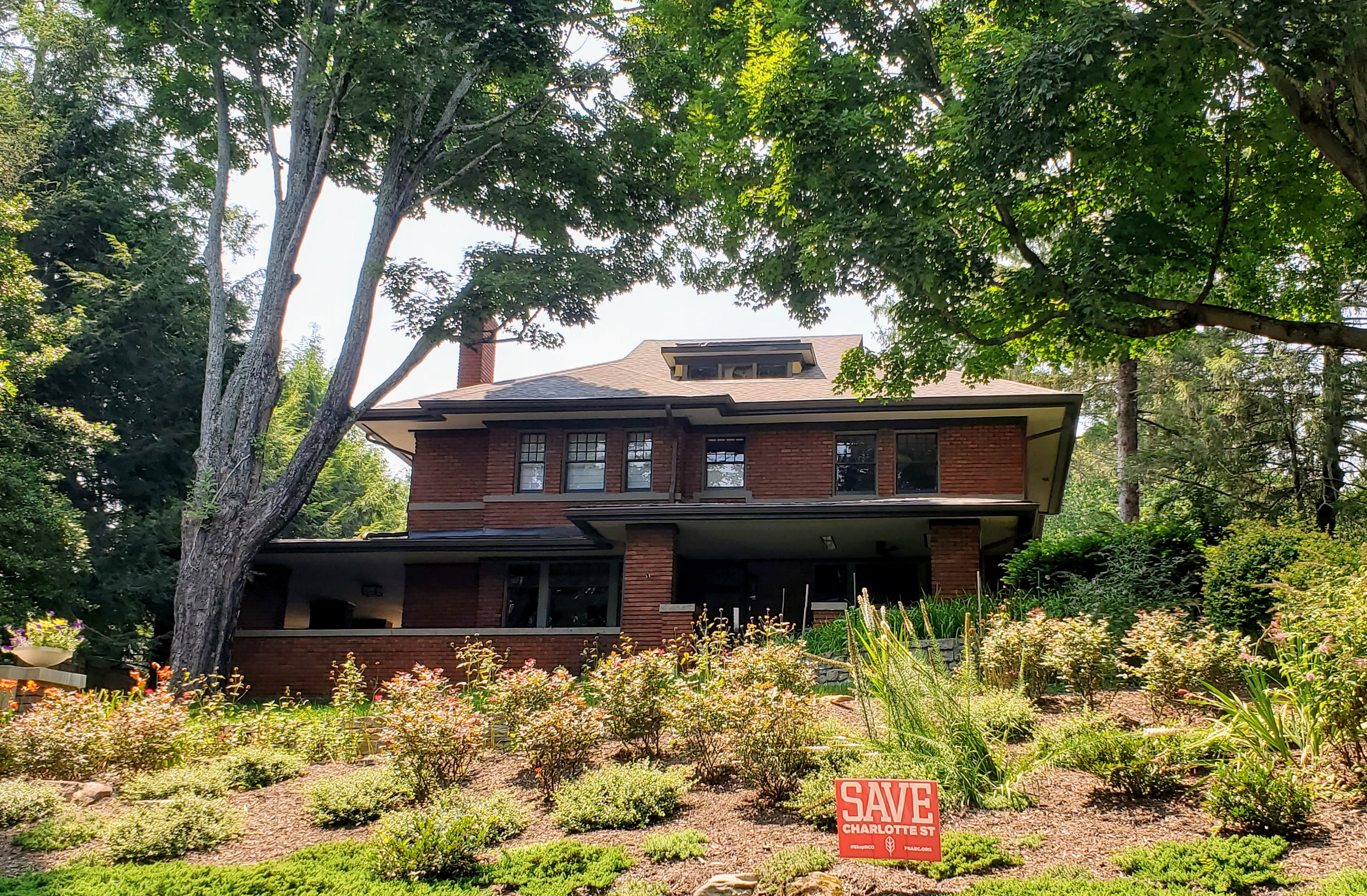
62 Gertrude Place, 2021

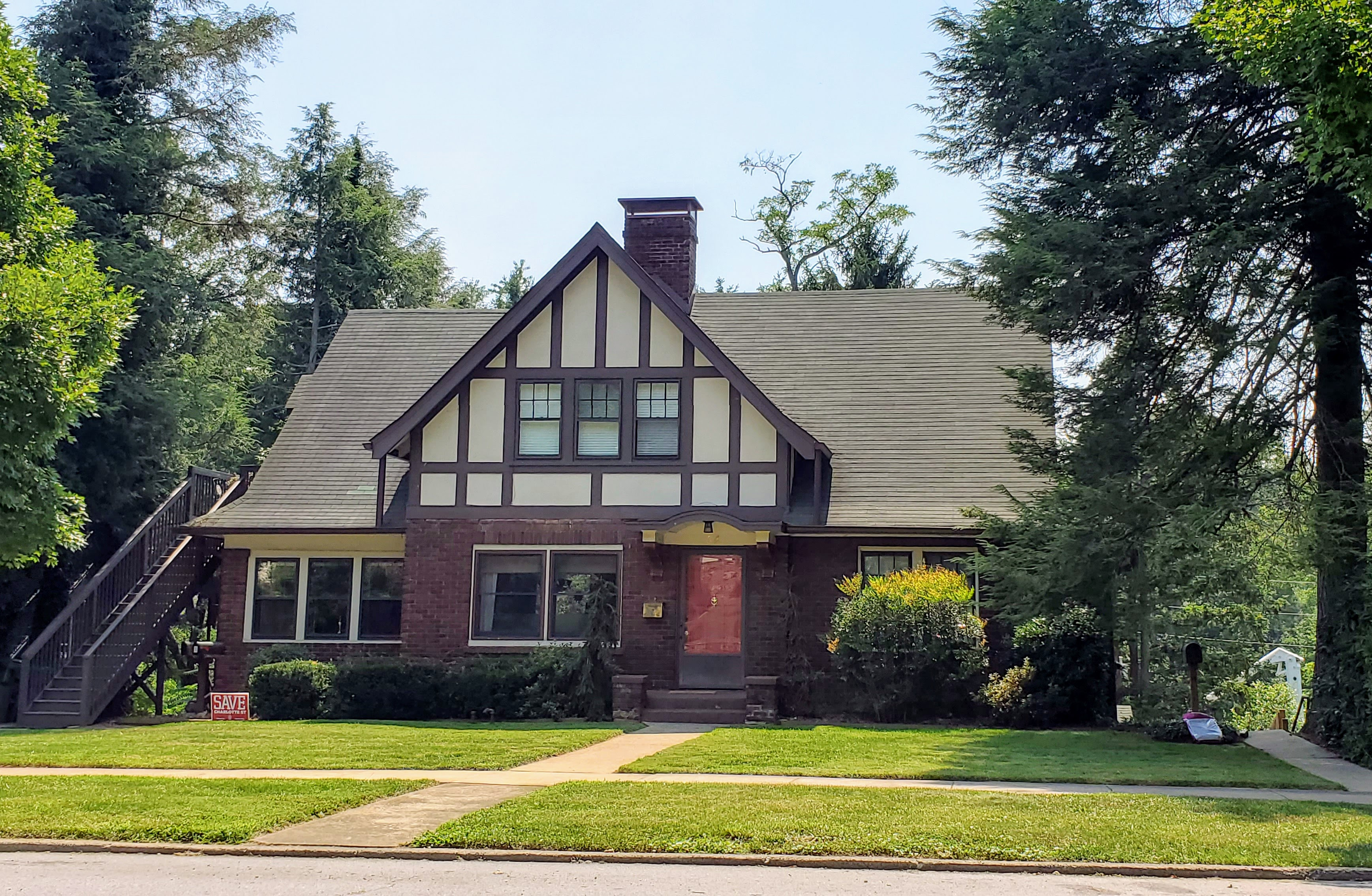
C.F. Byrd House, 2021

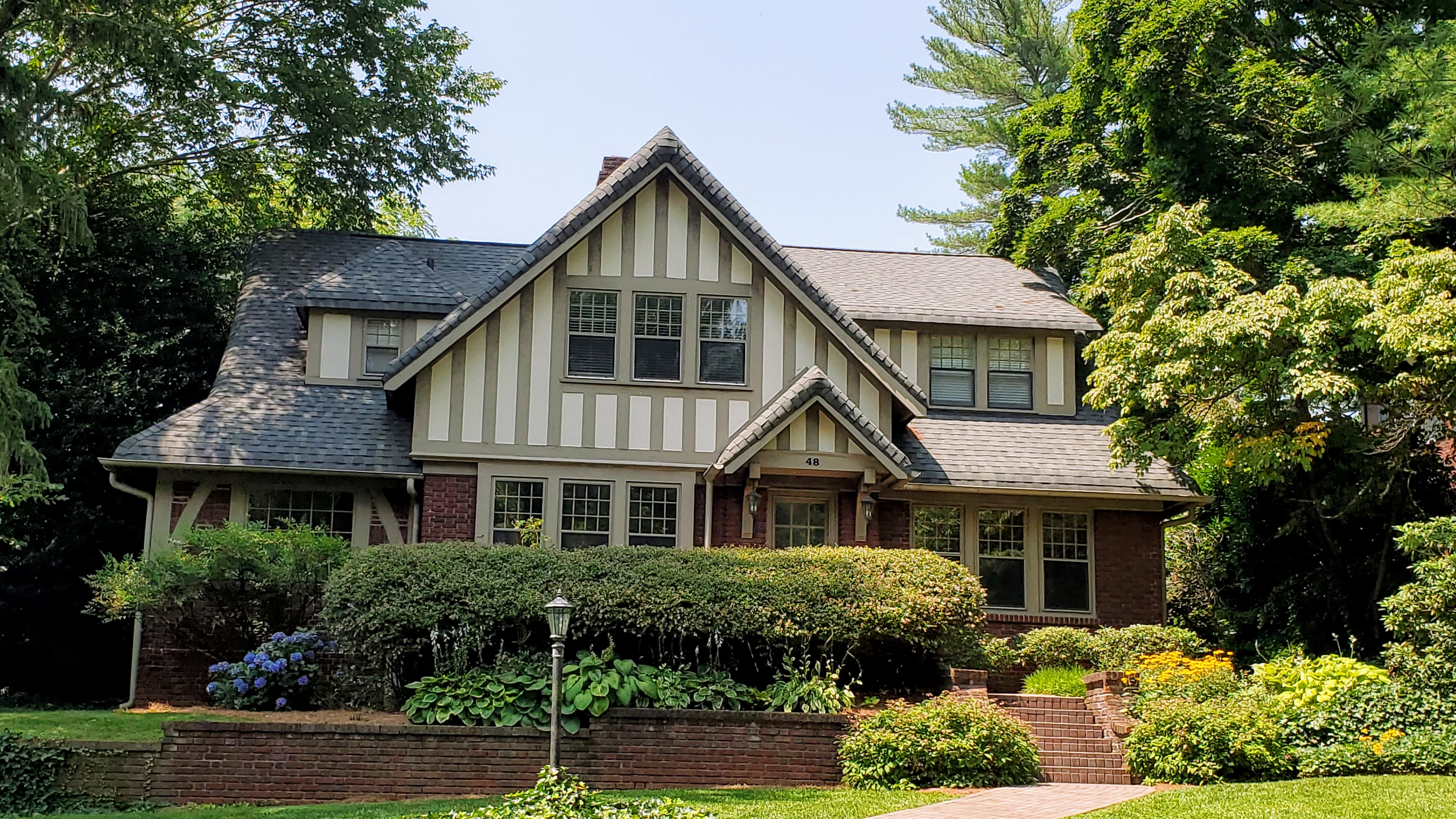
Charles V. Westall House, 2021

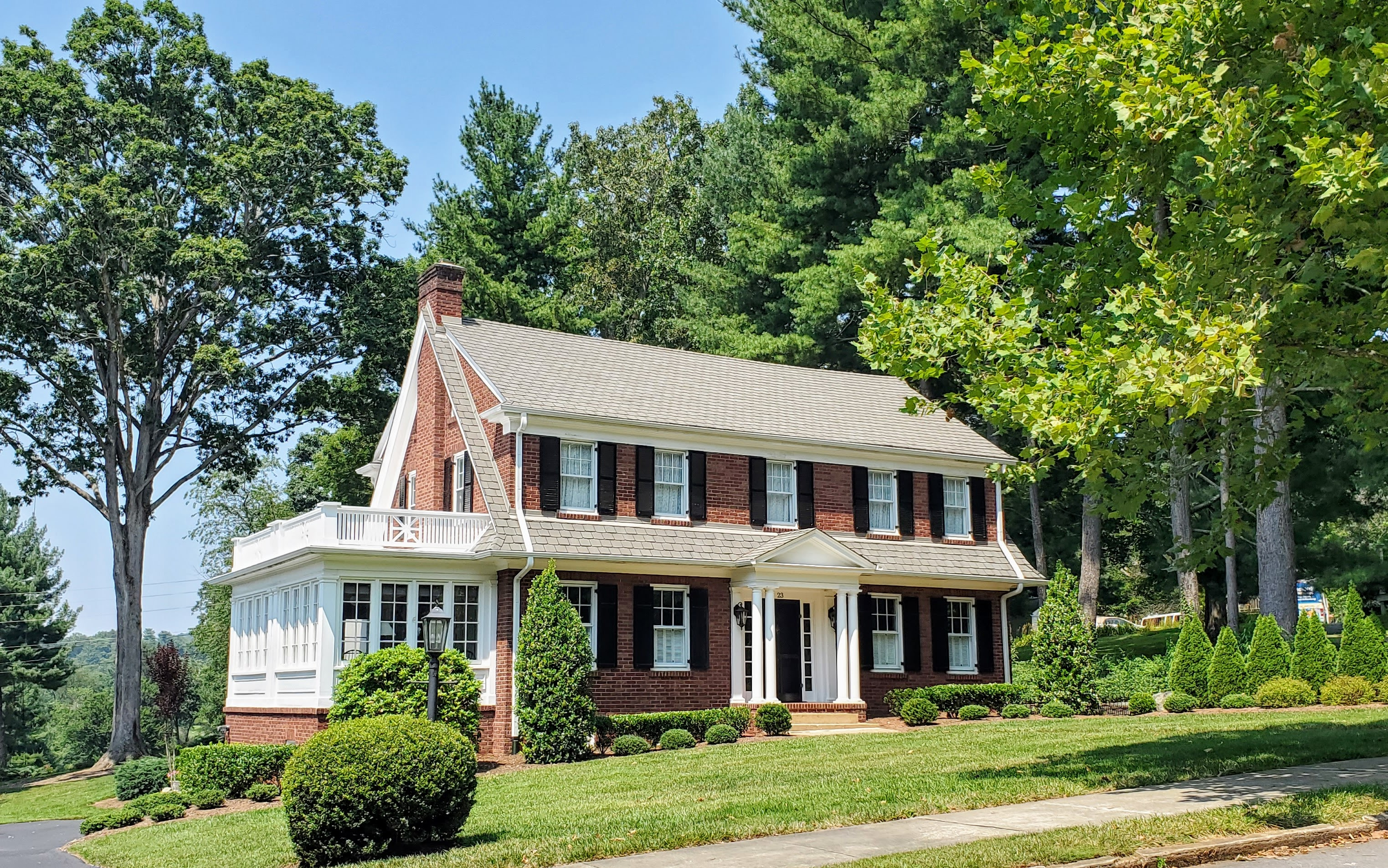
D. T. Simmons House, 2021

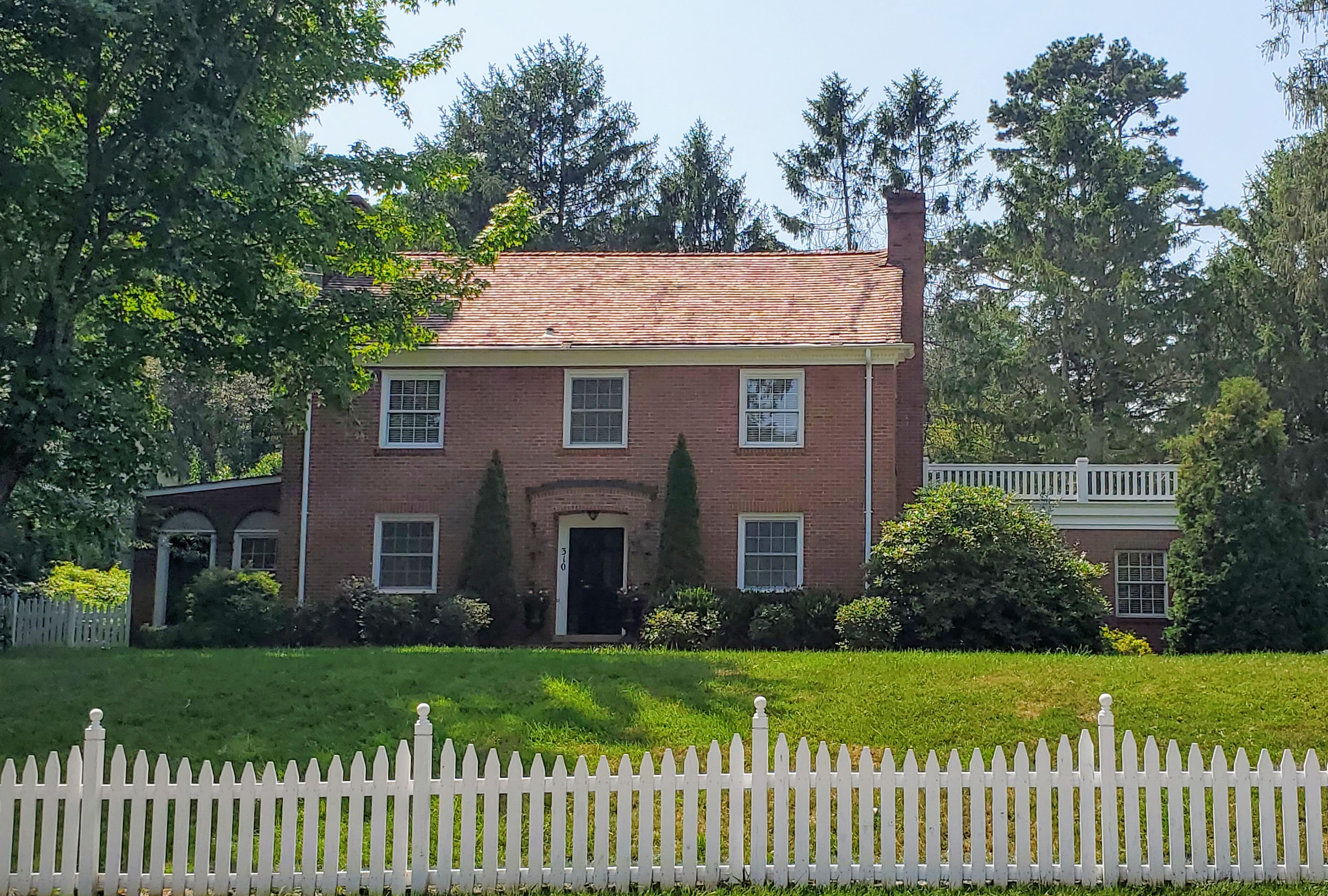
Dr. James P. Adams House, 2021

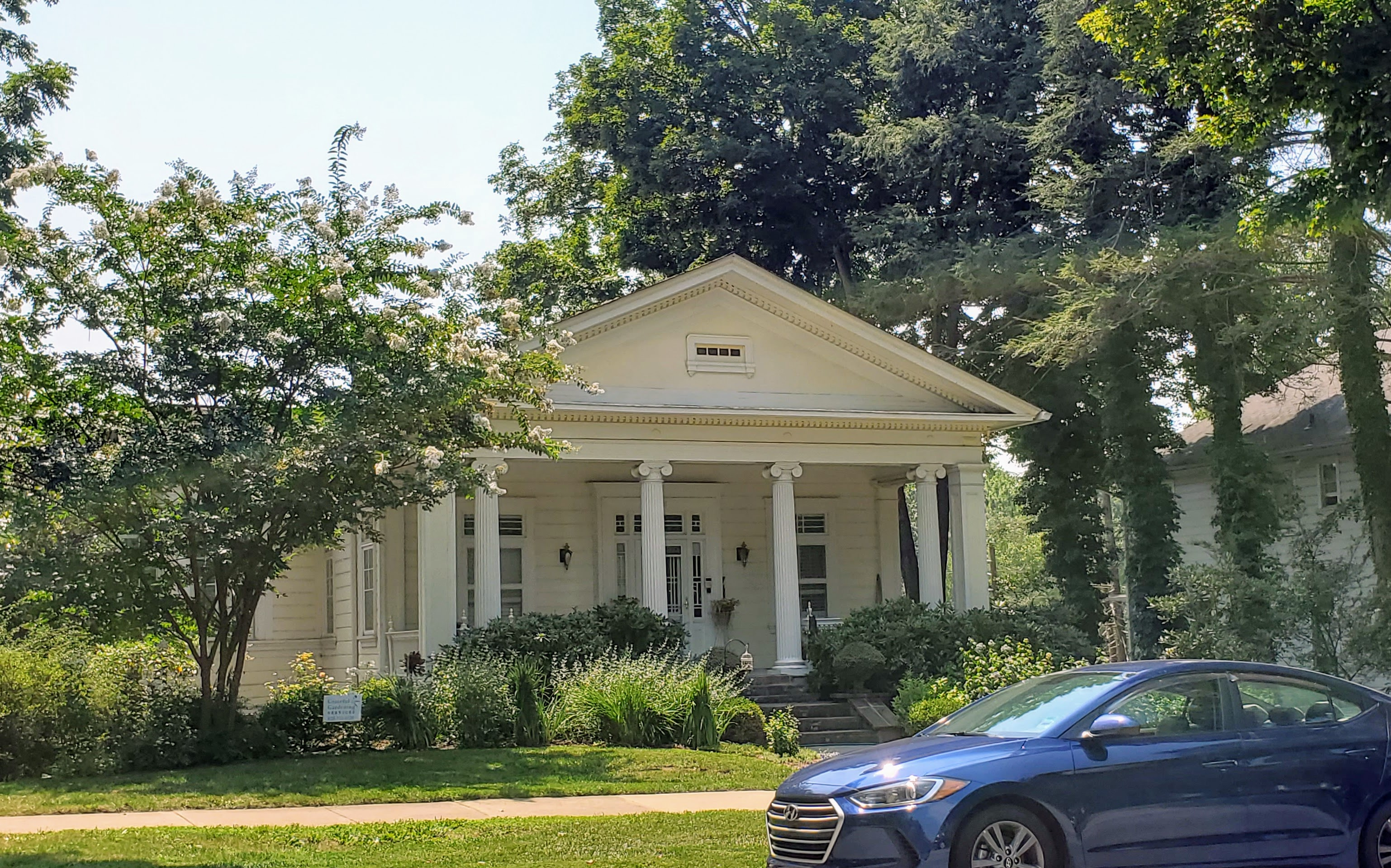
Edwin Ray House, 2021

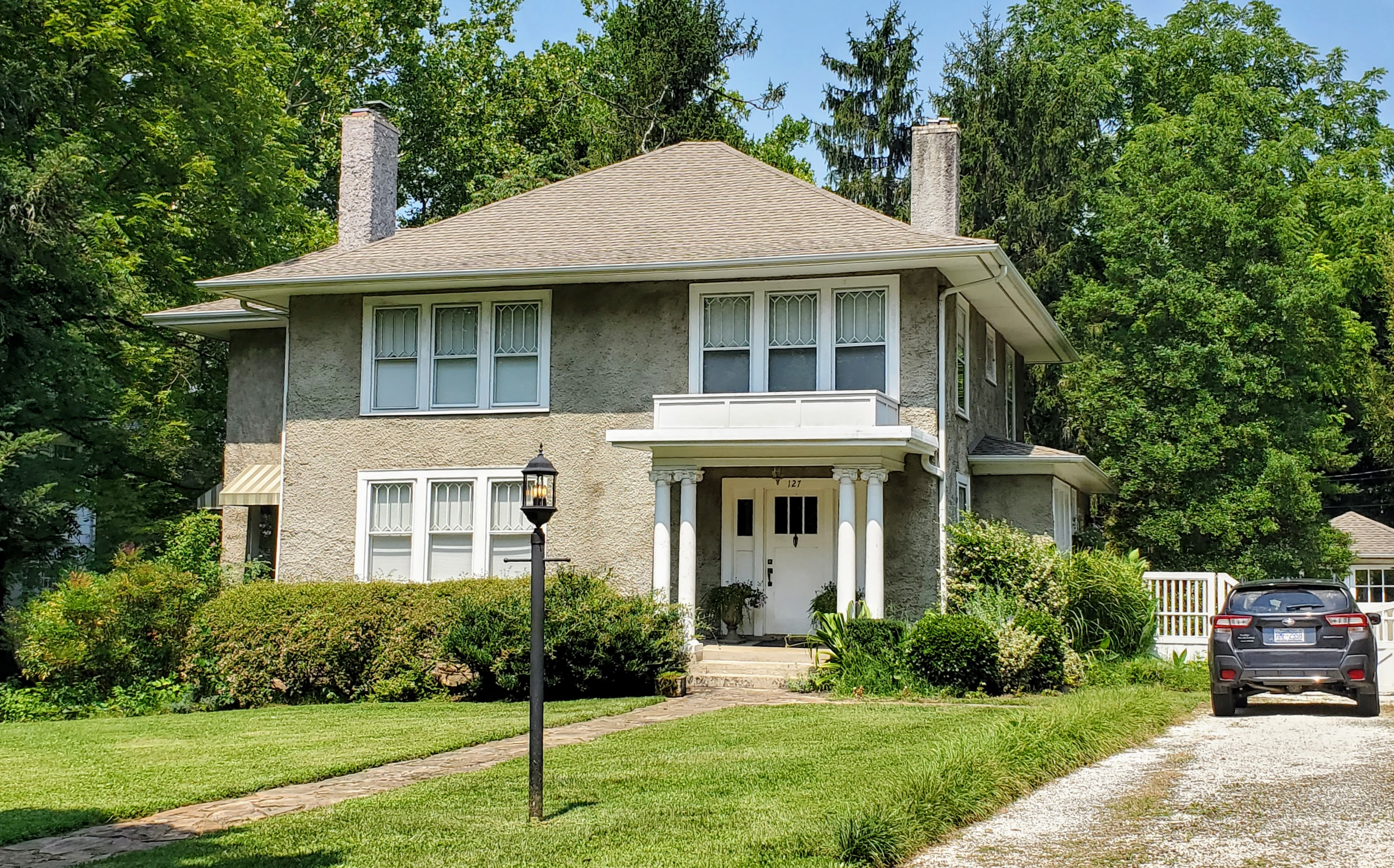
Ella Warner House, 2021

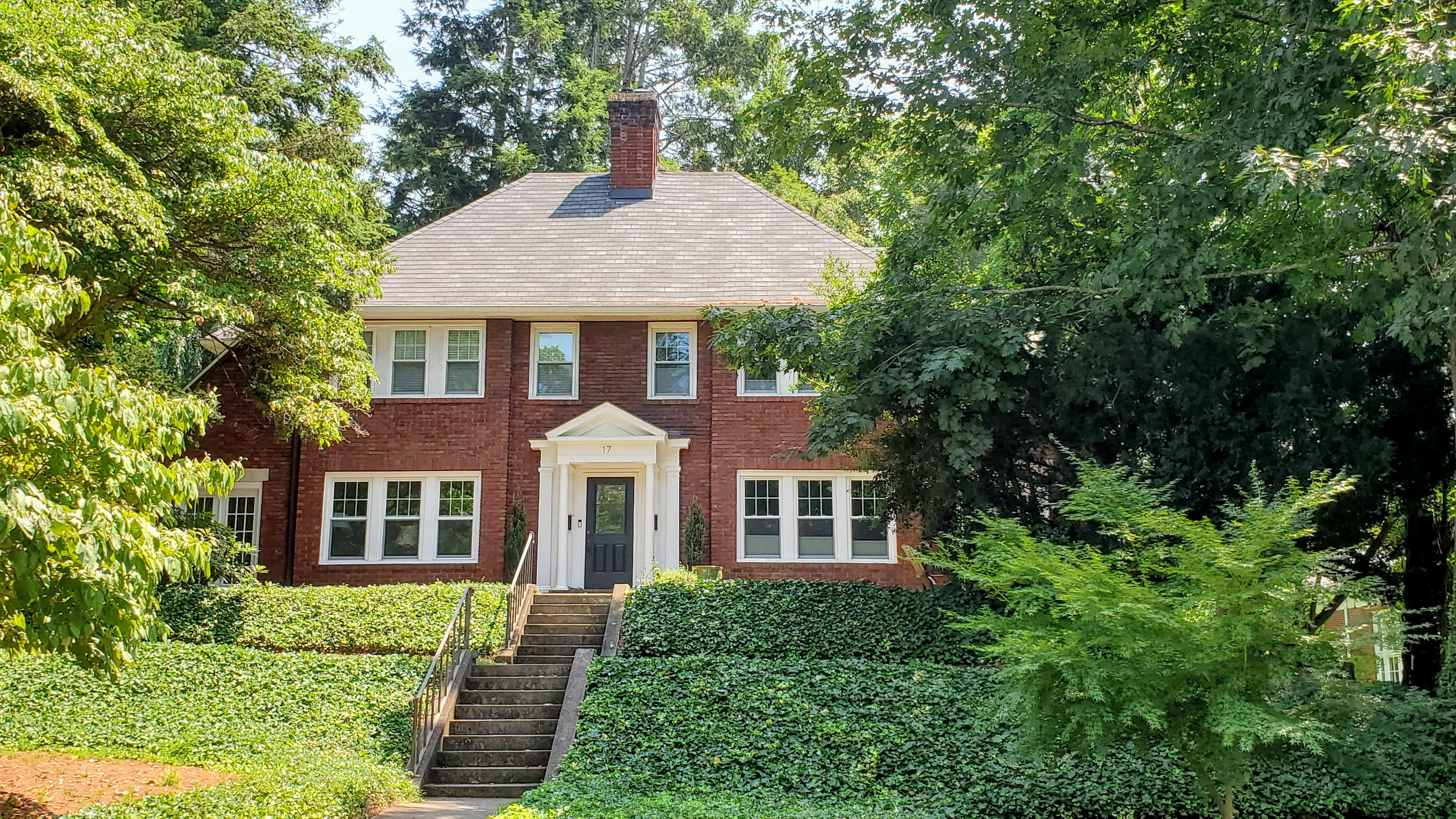
G.W. Donnan House, 2021

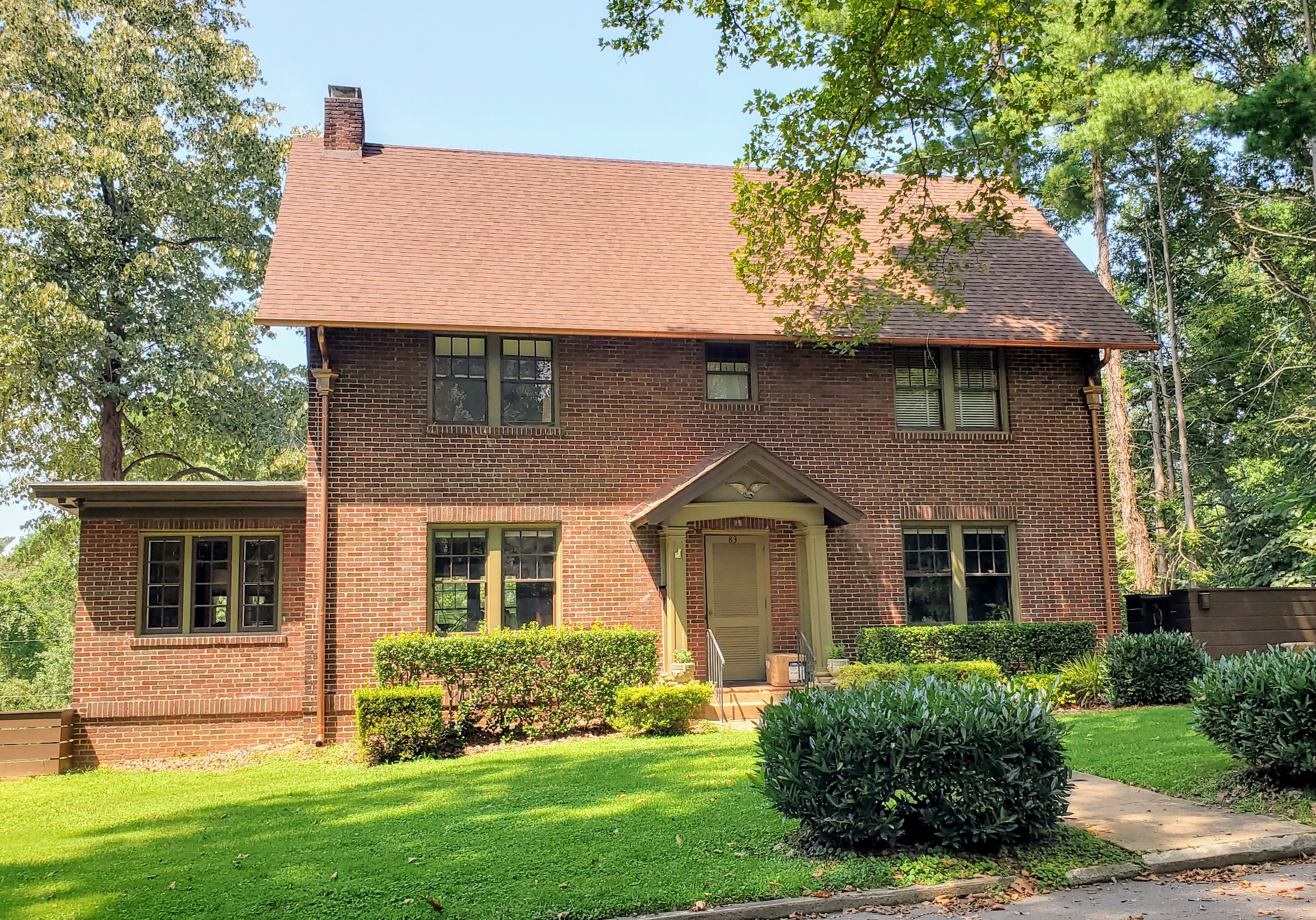
Genevieve Wolfe House, 2021

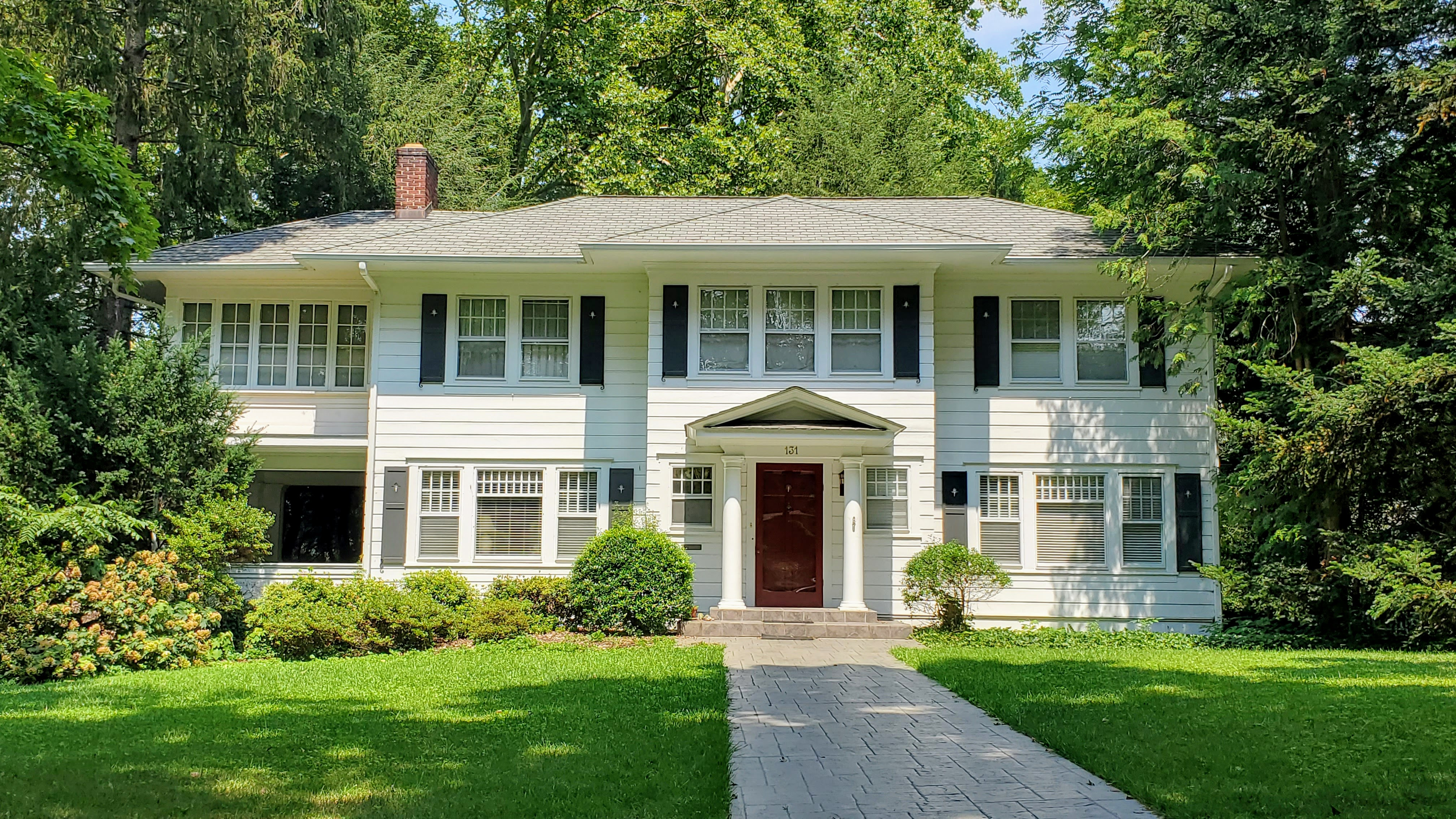
J.R. Rice House, 2021

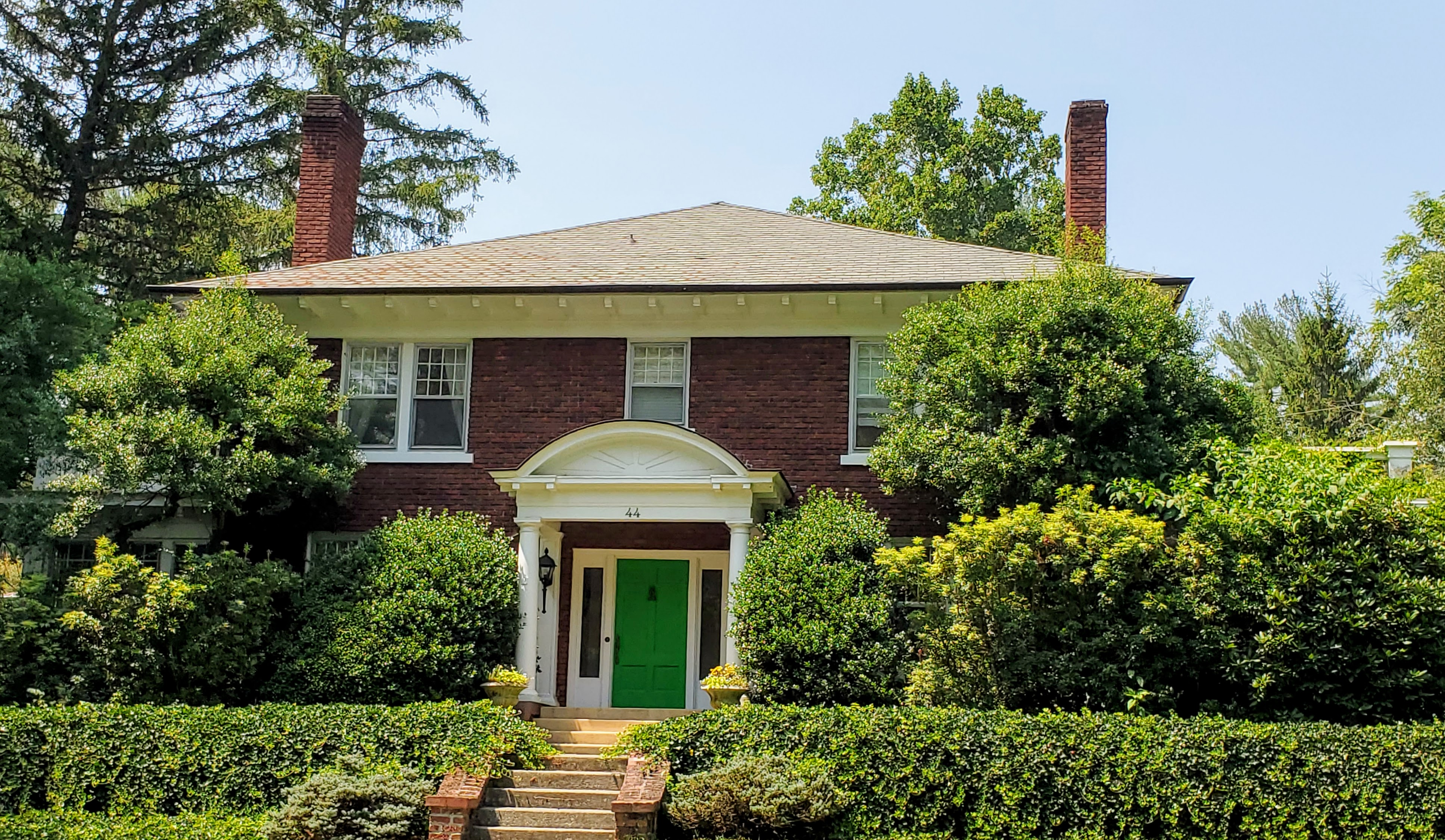
J.T. Bledsoe House, 2021

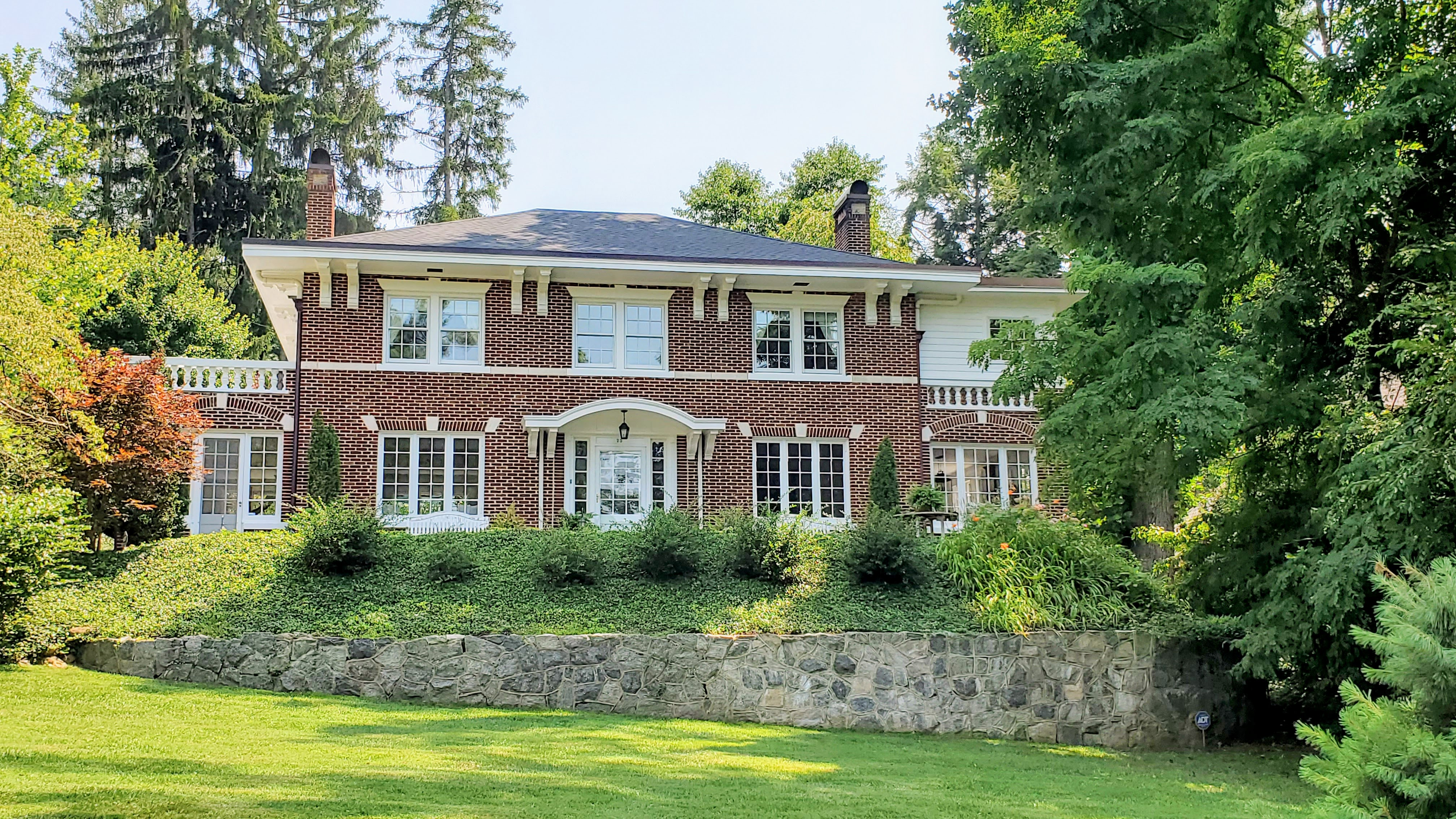
John A. Richbourg House, 2021

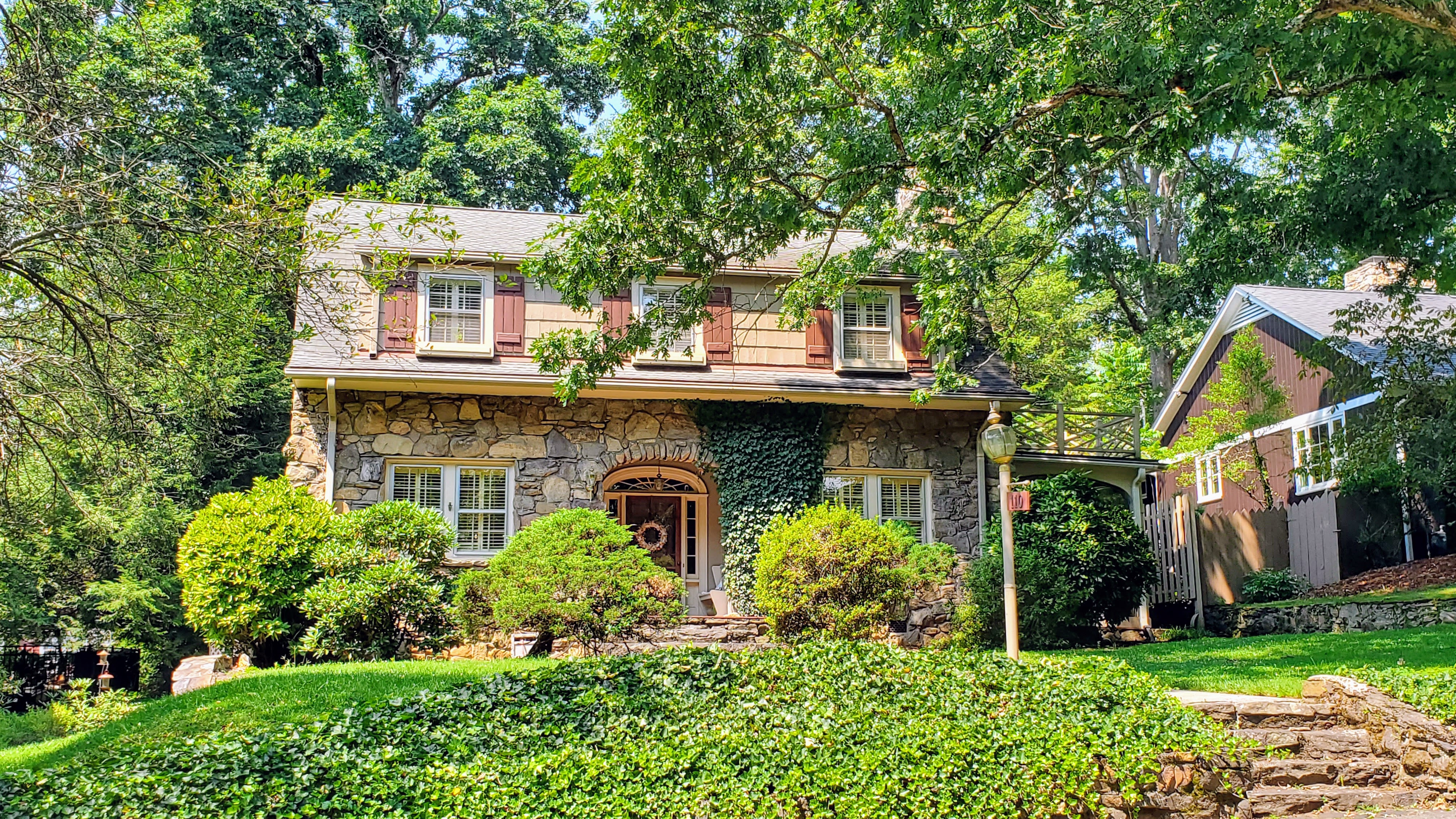
John B. Hooks House, 2021

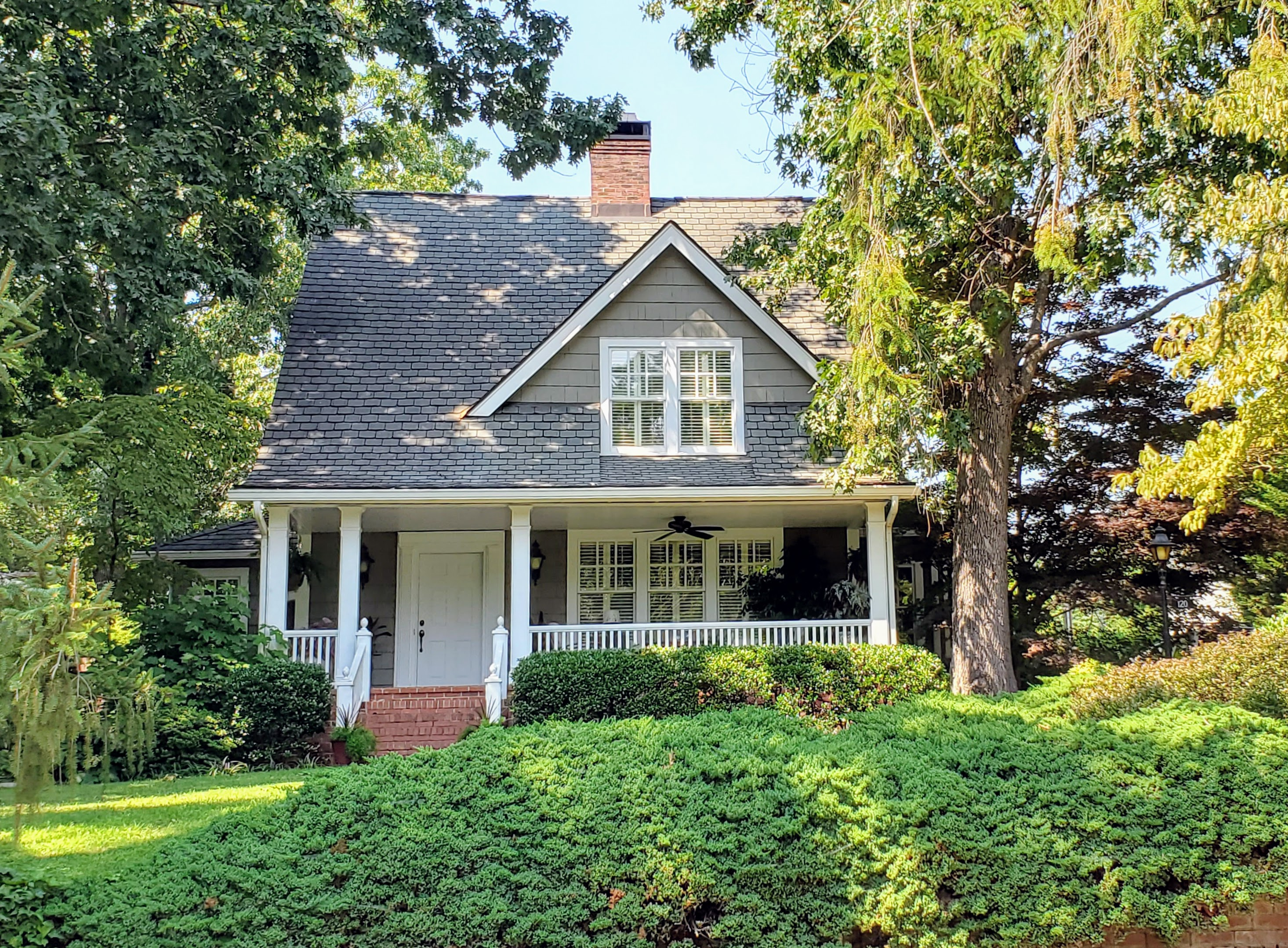
John E. Wilson House, 2021

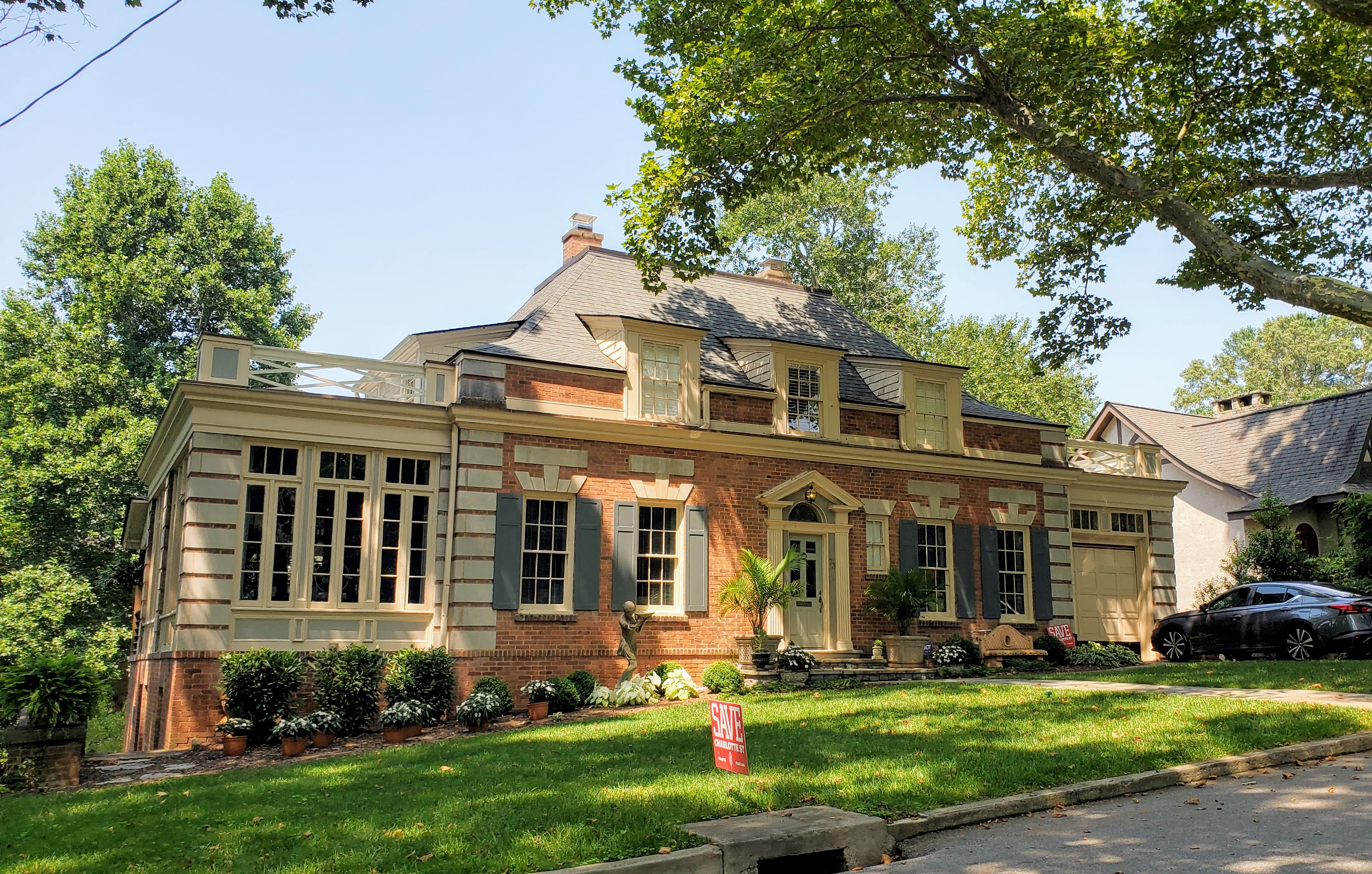
Otto Hans Palm House, 2021
