= Even As We Breathe =

2020 American novel

- First ed. cover
- Author: Annette Saunooke Clapsaddle
- Language: English
- Genre: Historical fiction
- Publisher: University Press of Kentucky
- Publication date: 2020 (first edition)
- Publication place: United States
- Media type: Print
- Pages: 231 pp.
- ISBN: 1950564061
- OCLC: 1151802424

Even As We Breathe is a 2020 novel by Annette Saunooke Clapsaddle. The book is the first published novel by a citizen of the Eastern Band of Cherokee Indians. It tells the story of a young Cherokee man named Cowney who is grappling with his identity as he leaves the Qualla Boundary during the summer of 1942 to work at the Grove Park Inn in Asheville, North Carolina. While the novel contains elements of mystery, Clapsaddle considers it a work of historical fiction. Clapsaddle received the Thomas Wolfe Memorial Literary Award for her work on the novel.

== Plot summary ==
During the summer of 1942, at the height of World War II, nineteen-year-old Cowney Sequoyah thinks of leaving his home in the Qualla Boundary to work at the Grove Park Inn and Resort in Asheville, North Carolina. He is worried about leaving his grandmother, Lishie, who took care of him after his parents died when he was an infant. However, Cowney is curious about life outside of Cherokee and wants to leave his uncle Bud, who makes fun of his disabled foot. Frustrated that his foot prevents him from joining the military like other men in his community, Cowney accepts the groundskeeper job and leaves the Qualla Boundary with Essie Stamper, a young Cherokee woman who will be working as a maid at the same inn.

After taking the job, Cowney and Essie learn that despite being treated like guests, the people staying at the inn are actually diplomats from the Axis powers being held as prisoners. Cowney's co-workers treat him terribly for being Cherokee, but Cowney focuses on his groundskeeping tasks and his budding friendship with Essie to get through the summer. While working on the property, Cowney uncovers a clean bone that appears to be human. Feeling a sense of connection with it, he shows the bone to Essie before hiding it so that it would not be confiscated by the authorities. Cowney goes on to experience personal heartbreak and familial loss while working at the inn, but when the young daughter of one of the diplomats goes missing, Cowney faces a problem he never expected to have and must work to prove his own innocence.

== Characters ==
Clapsaddle stated that none of the characters represent real-life individuals, but some have traits of people she knows.

Cowney Sequoyah: A nineteen-year-old Cherokee man living in the Qualla Boundary when the story takes place. He dreams of leaving his hometown and pursuing college. Cowney narrates the story from a retrospective point of view as an older man.

Essie: A young Cherokee woman from Cowney's town who goes to work as a cleaner at the Grove Park Inn with him. She is Cowney's love interest and a close friend to him.

Lishie: Cowney's paternal grandmother, who takes on the responsibility of raising Cowney.

Bud: Cowney's uncle on his father's side. He was a soldier in World War I with Cowney's father. He lives in a cabin in Cherokee and works odd jobs.

== Setting ==
Even As We Breathe occurs primarily at the Grove Park Inn, where the main character is employed. With real-life historical background, the Grove Park Inn, originally established in 1913, was paid by the government to become a detention site for Axis diplomats in 1942. The enforced rules and regulations were rigid, but the diplomats were still given adequate amenities despite its status as a detention facility. The Grove Park Inn was not a permanent place of residence for diplomats during the war but rather a temporary prison for those individuals. Many of the situations Cowney encounters at the inn reflect real-life accounts of how the inn functioned during World War II, such as the overall treatment of the diplomats and how the inn was heavily guarded.

== Major themes ==
=== Repatriation ===
Clapsaddle's inclusion of the bone in the novel alludes to ideas regarding repatriation and the Native American Graves Protection and Repatriation Act. Clapsaddle said she wanted to communicate the message that humans share a universal experience with all living and nonliving creatures, and this sentiment is conveyed with Cowney's careful treatment of the bone. According to Erica Abrams Locklear, Clapsaddle took further care to avoid the "mystical" Indigenous stereotype while writing Even As We Breathe, and this care influences how the novel explores the importance of repatriation to the Cherokee people. This mystifying of Indigenous groups often aids in the dehumanization of these individuals after their death, exacerbated by how museums and institutions around the United States still resist the return of human remains and items looted from Indigenous land in the past. Clapsaddle stated in an interview that she wanted to "show Cherokee bones treated as human remains rather than artifacts."

=== Identity ===
Identity is an important concept throughout the novel. The main components of identity explored in the novel are racial discrimination and spiritual duality. Clapsaddle portrays racial discrimination of Indigenous individuals through multiple trials that Cowney encounters from being denied movie tickets at a theatre to being accused of a serious crime without substantial evidence. She emphasizes the traditional Cherokee spiritual importance of water, but also includes a segment where Cowney attends a Christian church service with his grandmother.

=== Entrapment ===
The novel has a distinctly Appalachian theme of entrapment. Locklear discusses the distinctive trait of Appalachian people wanting to leave their homes, symbolized by the mountains being a cage, yet feeling regret after doing so. Clapsaddle portrays this theme in the novel through Cowney's longing to escape from one entrapment only to experience another one. Despite him leaving the Qualla Boundary as he wished, he feels a sense of homesickness while working at the inn. Locklear writes that the novel includes fundamentally Appalachian literary elements like emphasis on Christianity, environmental issues, and the importance of place.

== Style ==
Clapsaddle stated that the novel's length is a choice made to maintain a quickly-paced plot. She also said the first-person point of view helped her represent the Cherokee people in a more genuine manner. According to her, the point of view created a more relatable protagonist in Cowney, and using the retrospective narration helped illuminate Cowney's maturity. The novel's humorous tone represents a survival mechanism for real people in Cherokee communities, and the humor helps balance the darker elements. Clapsaddle said incorporating the Cherokee language into the novel was important to her. She commented that she did not include a glossary of Cherokee words used in the novel to express that the Cherokee language in the book represents a worldview rather than a prescriptive language lesson. Clapsaddle said that situating the story in a historical past allows for a more critical analysis of that time.

== Background ==
While Cowney himself is a fictional character, his character is based on real people who existed in a real-world event. Clapsaddle revealed in an interview that Cowney's name originated from a name within her family and aids in an accurate representation of reality as she herself is Eastern Band Cherokee.

Clapsaddle said that the prompt that inspired her to begin the novel was a quote by James Baldwin: "Write a sentence as clean as a bone." Silas House was the editor of Even As We Breathe, and it was the first book he edited.

== Release ==
Clapsaddle received assistance from the Great Smokies Writing Program to write the novel, and the University Press of Kentucky published it on September 8, 2020. Clapsaddle said that she was not thinking at the time that it would be the first published novel from her tribe and that it came to her attention after she signed the contract.

== Reception ==
Anjali Enjeti of The Atlanta Journal-Constitution said, "Some of the most groundbreaking novels set in Appalachia have been released in the last few years. [...] Clapsaddle’s Even As We Breathe belongs in this astute group and evokes a similar theme." Erica Abrams Locklear of The Northern Carolina Literary Review acknowledges Clapsaddle's attention to detail in dialect and correction of stereotypes when describing the Cherokee characters in the novel. In addition, she is praised for creating a unique space of accurate representation for Cherokee tribes and the people of Appalachia. Clapsaddle also received the Thomas Wolfe Memorial Literary Award from the Western North Carolina Historical Association. The chair of the selection committee, Catherine Frank, stated that the novel "exemplifies the quality of the most compelling regional writing." Author Charles Frazier writes in his blurb for the novel that "Even As We Breathe is a fresh, welcome, and much-needed addition to the fiction of the Appalachian South and its neglected people and places."
