= Fred L. Seely =

American businessman

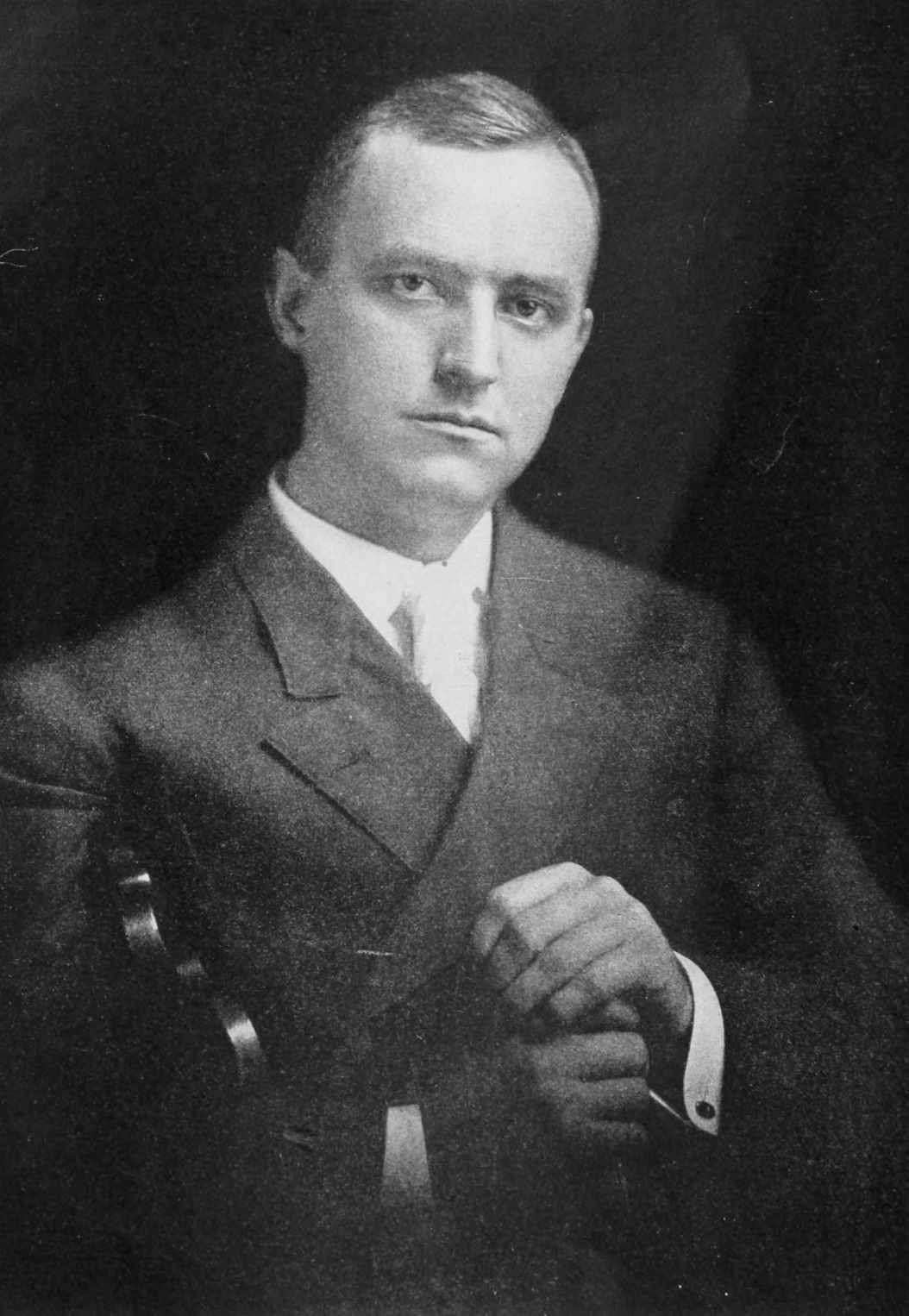
Fred L. Seely

Fred Loring Seely (December 22, 1871 – March 14, 1942) was an American newspaperman, chemist, inventor and philanthropist.

Born to Uriah and Nancy Hopping Seely, in Monmouth, New Jersey, Fred Seely first worked for the Parke-Davis pharmaceutical company and later became an executive for his father-in-law Edwin Wiley Grove's "Paris Medicine Company," a patent medicine business based in Tennessee. In 1906, with Mr. Grove's financial backing, Seely founded the Atlanta Georgian daily newspaper. He also took on many socially active causes, one of which was the exposure of chain gang labour practices in Georgia. State prisoners were being rented out for fifty cents a week, and many of these inmates received poor treatment at the hands of their temporary employers. Seely used his newspaper as a pulpit to broadcast the abuses of the chain-gang labor system. He was instrumental in helping to terminate this form of modern slave labor in Georgia. Many of his advertisers, however, had profited by using the prison laborers and were thus furious with Seely for his activism in this cause. They subsequently dropped their support for his newspaper, and this precipitated the sale of the paper to Randolph Hearst in 1912. After this, Seely went to North Carolina where in 1913 he built the Grove Park Inn with his father-in-law Edwin Wiley Grove. In 1917, he purchased Biltmore Estate Industries from Edith Vanderbilt and changed the name to Biltmore Industries, Inc. The death of Mrs. Vanderbilt's husband and the great flood of the French Broad and Swannanoa Rivers in 1916 (which submerged the original Biltmore Industries site) inspired the Vanderbilts to sell the enterprise. This small factory was primarily a home-spun wool weaving and woodworking business. Seely employed many deaf persons to work in his factory; two of his own siblings, in fact, were deaf. He also acted as the architect and builder of his home "Overlook" (sometimes called "Seely's Castle") on Sunset Mountain overlooking Asheville.

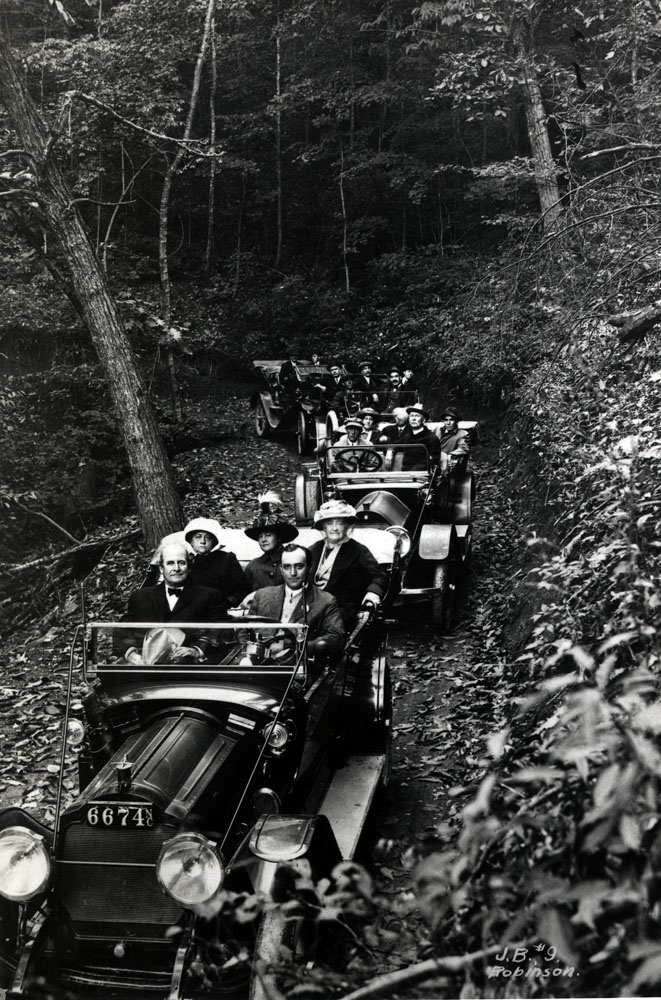
Fred Seely driving William Jennings Bryan on visit by the politician and his wife to Grove Park Inn, autumn 1913. Seely at the wheel of Packard automobile at front of motorcade; Jennings seated beside him.

The relationship between Seely and his father-in-law, Edwin W. Grove, who would not sell him the Grove Park Inn, apparently was troubled from the start, and never improved. Writes Helen Wykle, who studied their relationship and wrote on the relationship between the two men:

"Seely managed the Grove Park Inn for his father-in-law for nearly 14 years but was unable to convince E.W. Grove to sell him the hotel. The resulting animosity between the two put a strain on their relationship and on Fred Seely's marriage to Grove's daughter Evelyn. Seely had come to Asheville to work with Grove as a chemist. Grove's Chill Tonic and other "medicinal" remedies made both Grove and Seely large fortunes, but it also made them bitter rivals. Grove's jealousy and his competitive nature were never overcome and Seely, talented and charming as he was, never was successful in charming or winning the affection of his father-in-law. The correspondence and the ensuing lawsuit in which Seely sued Grove for breach of promise were bitter and futile engagements for Seely."

Grove died at the Battery Park Hotel in Asheville, N.C., on January 27, 1927. However, Seely continued his lawsuit against Grove's estate. The 1928 court case was heard in St. Louis where Grove's Paris Medicine Company was based. The suit ended in 1928 when a presumed final will was found that purportedly proved that Grove had not promised Seely any special remuneration or ownership rights for his years of work for Paris Medicine Company and the Grove Park Inn.

As a result of Seely's failed lawsuit, Gertrude (Grove's second wife), their son Eddie, Jr., and Evelyn Grove Seely (daughter from Grove's first marriage to sweet Mary Louisa Moore Grove) became the will-decreed co-owners and beneficiaries of the trust income from the Grove Park Inn operations. Gertrude Grove subsequently sued for widow's rights (contrary to the prohibitive terms of Edwin Grove's will) to force the other parties to buy her out of the Grove Park Inn property. This successful suit resulted in the forced sale of the Grove Park Inn. When she died later in 1928 her son Eddie Jr., inherited her share of Paris Medicine Company and became owner of two thirds of Grove's estate. Evelyn Grove Seely retained ownership of one-third of the estate and the Battery Park Hotel and various properties which include Seely's Castle.

Fred Seely returned to Asheville after the failed lawsuit and continued his philanthropic works. He was instrumental in convincing Eerste Nederlandsche Kunzyd-fabriek Arnhem (E.N.K.A.) to build a new rayon fiber factory on vacant farmland adjacent to Hominy Creek in Buncombe County. A 2011 web exhibit narrative by Robert Cuningham entitled "Fred Loring Seely and American E.N.K.A." portrays the details of this factory locating in Buncombe County. This new factory, completed in a record time of one year (1928–1929), provided up to 5,000 new and steady-income jobs for the local workforce. E.N.K.A.'s factory produced rayon cord for tires that were used on equipment in Europe to help the Allies win World War II. Seely also continued with his famous Biltmore Industries (located in the shadow of the immense Grove Park Inn) even as the Great Depression bore down on the U.S. economy. Fred Loring Seely died March 14, 1942, at the age of 70. He is buried at Calvary Episcopal Church cemetery in Fletcher, N.C., along with his wife Evelyn (d. 1953), his second daughter Mary Louise Seely Beard (d. 1950), and his youngest son Fred Loring Seely, Jr. (d.1991). After his death his widow, Evelyn Grove Seely, moved to the Battery Park Hotel in downtown Asheville. In 1949 Evelyn Seely sold the home to what would become Asheville-Biltmore College, the forerunner of what is now the University of North Carolina at Asheville. The college operated at the Sunset Mountain castle site until 1961.

On June 17, 2017, the Grovewood Gallery, located on the grounds of the Biltmore Industries, held a centennial celebration honoring a century of history of wool weaving and wood working and art and antique automobiles.
