= University Press of Kentucky =

Scholarly publisher for Kentucky

- Parent company: University of Kentucky Office of the Provost
- Founded: 1949
- Founder: Thomas D. Clark
- Country of origin: United States
- Headquarters location: Lexington, Kentucky
- Distribution: Hopkins Fulfillment Services (US); Oxbow Books (UK, Europe, Africa, the Middle East, Asia, the Pacific, Australia and New Zealand)
- Key people: Ashley Runyon, Director
- Official website: kentuckypress.com

The University Press of Kentucky (UPK) is the scholarly publisher for the Commonwealth of Kentucky, and was organized in 1969 as successor to the University of Kentucky Press. The university had sponsored scholarly publication since 1943. In 1949, the press was established as a separate academic agency under the university president, and the following year Bruce F. Denbo, then of Louisiana State University Press, was appointed as the first full-time professional director. Denbo served as director of UPK until his retirement in 1978, building a small but distinguished list of scholarly books with emphasis on American history and literary criticism.

Since its reorganization, the Press has represented a consortium that now includes all of Kentucky's state universities, seven of its private colleges, and two historical societies. UPK joined the Association of University Presses in 1947.

The press is supported by the Thomas D. Clark Foundation, a private nonprofit foundation established in 1994 for the sole purpose of providing financial support for The University Press of Kentucky. It is named in honor of Thomas D. Clark, Kentucky's historian laureate and the founder of The University Press of Kentucky.

== Consortium members ==
- Bellarmine University
- Berea College
- Centre College
- Eastern Kentucky University
- The Filson Historical Society
- Georgetown College
- Kentucky Historical Society
- Kentucky State University
- Morehead State University
- Murray State University
- Northern Kentucky University
- Spalding University
- Transylvania University
- University of Kentucky
- University of Louisville
- University of Pikeville
- Western Kentucky University

Each constituent institution is represented on a statewide editorial board, which determines editorial policy.

== Offices ==
Offices for the Administrative, Editorial, Production, and Marketing departments are found at the University of Kentucky, which is responsible for the overhead cost of the publishing operation. In 2012, UPK was moved under the aegis of the University of Kentucky Libraries, headed by Dean Terry Birdwhistell.

Bruce F. Denbo, UPK's first director, was succeeded by Kenneth H. Cherry, who came to UPK from the University of Tennessee Press. During his tenure, the size of the press more than quadrupled. Ken Cherry retired in the Fall of 2001, and his successor, Stephen Wrinn, formerly of Rowman & Littlefield Publishers, began as new director in April 2002. In August 2016, Leila Salisbury took over as director of the Press. Salisbury, who began her career at UPK, had served as director of the University Press of Mississippi since 2008. In 2020, Ashley Runyon, former director of trade publications at Indiana University Press, was named director.

== Publications ==
UPK's editorial program focuses on the humanities and the social sciences. Its commitment to film and military studies has earned it a national reputation in recent years. Since the formation of the consortium, the press has broadened its appeal to readers in Kentucky and Appalachia with publications of special regional interest. During the 1970s, it produced the Kentucky Nature Series and the 47-volume Kentucky Bicentennial Bookshelf.

The press publishes classic novels by Kentucky authors including Harriet Arnow, Janice Holt Giles, John Fox, Jr., James Still, and Jesse Stuart.

In 2023, the press began publishing the series Appalachian Futures, beginning with the book Tar Hollow Trans. UPK's goal with the series was to elevate Appalachian writers of often-ignored backgrounds. The editors of Appalachian Futures are Annette Saunooke Clapsaddle, Davis Shoulders, and Crystal Wilkinson. Appalachian Futures is part of a larger publisher movement to diversify modern Appalachian literature, with other major contributors including West Virginia University Press, Haymarket Books, and Hub City Press.

== See also ==
- List of English-language book publishing companies
- List of university presses
