= Edwin Wiley Grove =

American businessman and entrepreneur (1850–1927)

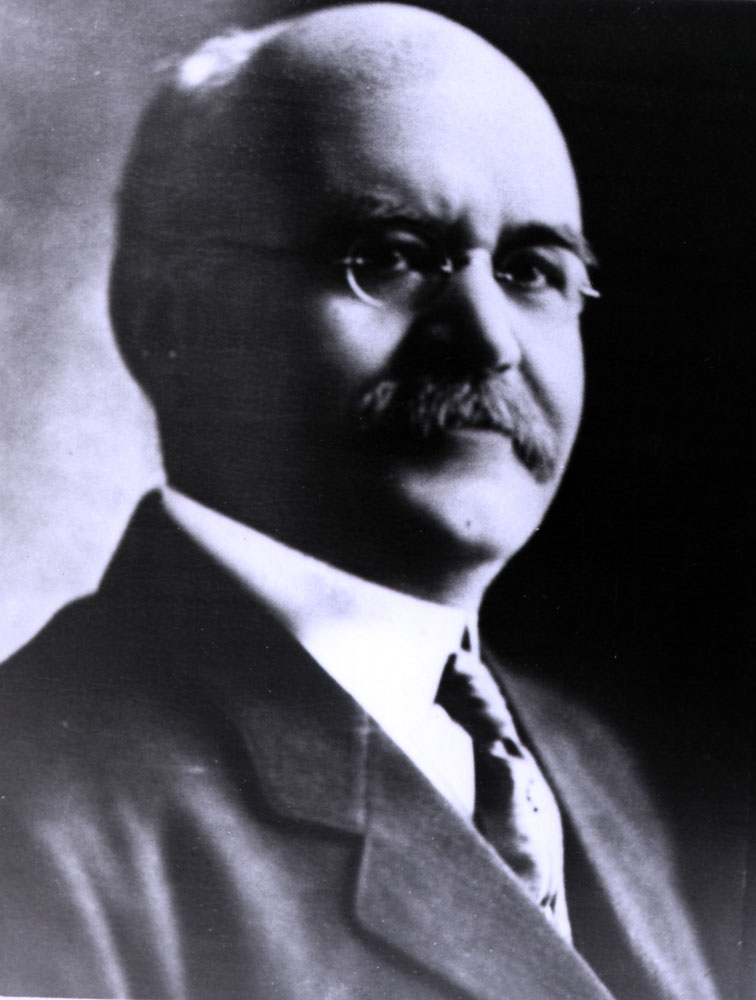
- Born: December 23, 1850; Whiteville, Tennessee, U.S.
- Died: January 27, 1927 (aged 76); Asheville, North Carolina, U.S.
- Burial place: Paris City Cemetery, Paris, Tennessee, U.S.
- Occupation(s): Pharmaceutical Manufacturer, Hotelier, Real Estate Developer, Philanthropist
- Known for: Grove's Tasteless Chill Tonic malaria remedy
- Spouses: Mary Louisa Moore (m. 1875; died 1883) Alice Gertrude Matthewson (m. 1886)
- Children: Irma; Evelyn; Hallett Hardin; Edwin Wiley Jr.; Helen
- Parents: James Grove; Elizabeth Jane Harris

Edwin Wiley Grove Sr. (December 23, 1850 – January 27, 1927), commonly known as E. W. Grove, was an American business magnate, entrepreneur, and self-made millionaire. He founded the Paris Medicine Company, creating and producing its most well-known patent medicine products, Grove's Tasteless Chill Tonic and Laxative Bromo Quinine tablets. He later invested in and developed properties in cities in the southern United States, including Atlanta, Georgia, and Asheville, North Carolina.

== Early life ==
Grove was born in Whiteville, Tennessee, on December 23, 1850, to James Henry Grove (1829–1880) and Elizabeth Jane Harris (1823–?). His father was a Confederate soldier who served with Nathan Bedford Forrest, and he had a younger sister Theophania (1852–1871). In 1874, after attending local schools, Grove moved to Paris, Tennessee, and served as a clerk in Dr. S. H. Caldwell and A. B. Mitchum's pharmacy. In 1880, he bought out the store and renamed it Grove's Pharmacy.

== Business career ==
After losing his wife and daughter to malaria, Grove developed Grove's Tasteless Chill Tonic, a remedy for the disease. First sold in 1885, it was made from quinine suspended in a flavored syrup in order to eliminate the bitter taste. The tasteless chill tonic, which some claimed was not entirely tasteless, was an improvement over taking straight quinine for fevers and chills caused by malaria. It contained cinchonine, cinchonidine, reduced iron, sweet syrup, and lemon flavor in a suspension that required shaking before use. Sources claim that by 1890, more bottles of Grove's Tasteless Chill Tonic were sold than bottles of Coca-Cola.

"I had a little drug business in Paris, Tennessee, just barely making a living, when I got up a real invention, tasteless quinine. As a poor man and a poor boy, I conceived the idea that whoever could produce a tasteless chill tonic, his fortune was made." — E. W. Grove

Grove's Laxative Bromo Quinine, which was first produced in 1896, was an early cold tablet that combined quinine with other ingredients thought to relieve cold symptoms, including bromide (a sedative) and a laxative. Although complete contents of the original tablets were not revealed, later formulations contained (in addition to quinine and bromide) phenolphthalein as the laxative, an analgesic such as acetanilide or phenacetin, and medicinal plant extracts. The success of Grove's products can be partly attributed to his talent for advertising. The tasteless chill tonic contained a chimeric ad campaign depicting the head of a baby affixed to the body of a pig with the slogan make your children as fat as pigs. It became immediately recognizable and was marketed as both a cure for malaria and a generic medication that would greatly improve one's health. The Bromo Quinine cold tablets were sold in a package that bore Grove's signature, thereby ensuring the buyer of the product's authenticity and implied quality.

In 1891, Grove moved his business to St. Louis, Missouri, a railroad center and inland port city, so he could more easily ship his product nationwide. The smoke from the factory district gave him chronic hiccups. In 1897, after his doctors' urgings, Grove built a summer home in Asheville, North Carolina, amid the clean mountain air. He later moved there permanently.

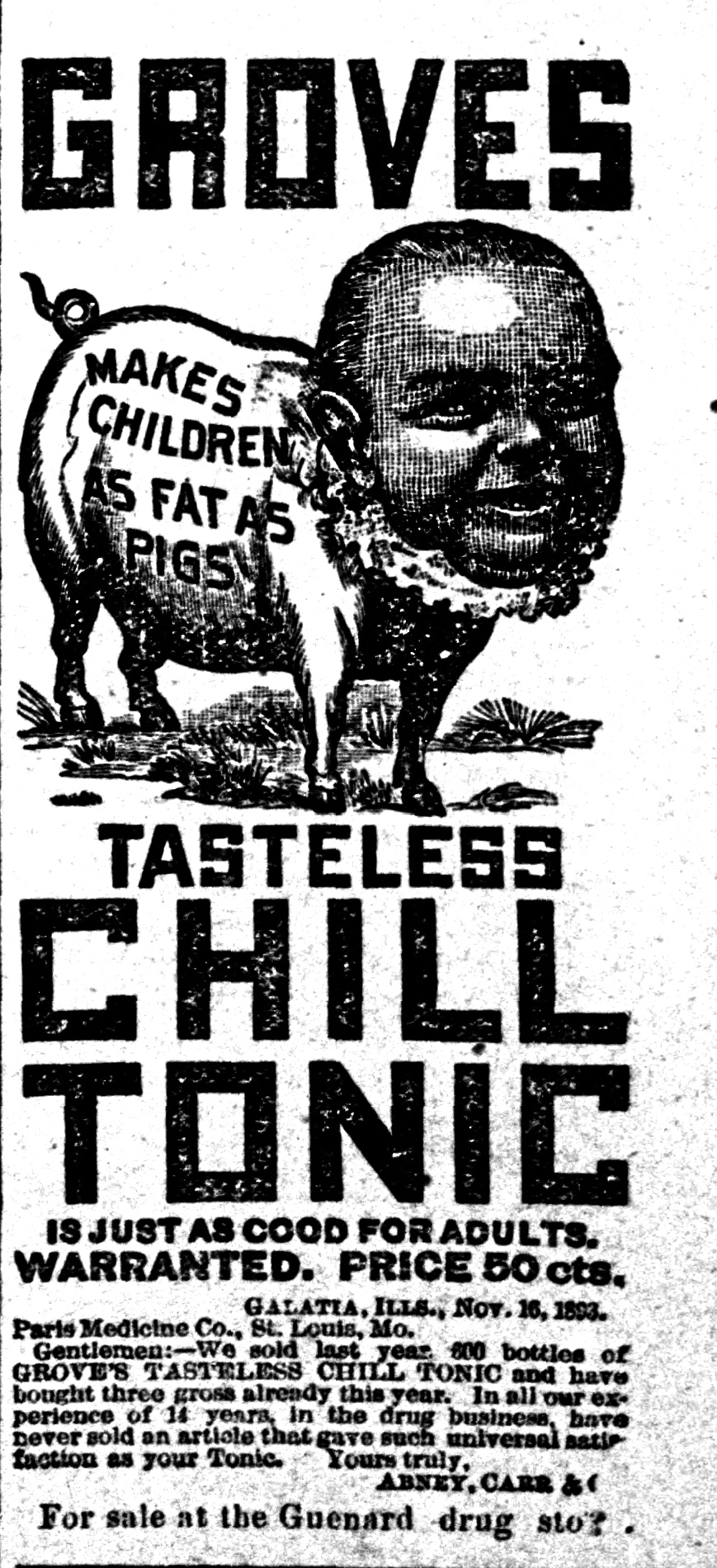
1898 ad for Grove's Tasteless Chill Tonic

Between 1902 and 1905, Grove bought land in Atlanta which he developed in 1912 as the streetcar suburb Atkins Park, named after family friend and mentor Colonel John DeWitt Clinton Atkins. Later he developed the Fortified Hills suburb in Atlanta, now the Grove Park neighborhood of Atlanta.

Grove was known to be generous, contributing to charitable, educational, and religious causes. He built and endowed a public high school, the E.W. Grove Henry County High School in Paris, Tennessee, which opened in 1906. An active Presbyterian, he endowed several churches of the denomination.

Beginning in 1905, he developed the Grove Park residential area and, in 1913, built The Grove Park Inn with his son-in-law Fred L. Seely. He later built the new Battery Park Hotel in downtown Asheville on the site of the former hotel of the same name. He also began construction of the Grove Arcade, an indoor mall of the sort common in Western Europe, which was completed in 1929 after his death.

== Personal life ==
In 1875, Grove married Mary Louisa Moore and had two daughters. Moore died in 1883, and in 1886, Grove married Alice Gertrude Matthewson and had two sons and one daughter.

In 1927, Grove died at the Battery Park Hotel in Asheville with funeral services held in the city's First Presbyterian Church, of which he was a member. He was buried in the family cemetery, Paris City Cemetery, near his place of birth.
