= The Omni Grove Park Inn =

- Grove Park Inn
- U.S. National Register of Historic Places
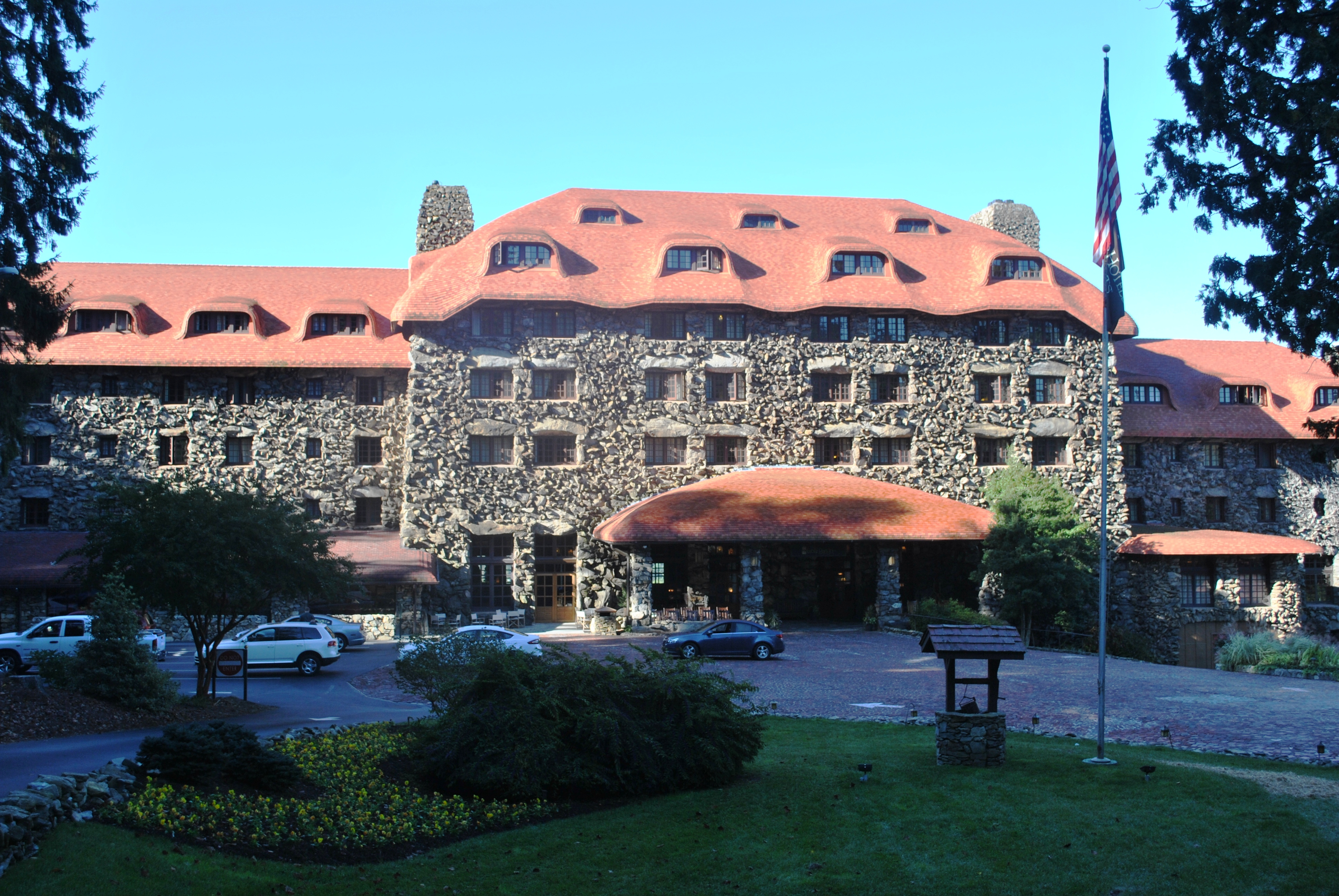

- Location within North Carolina Location within the United States
- Location: Asheville, North Carolina
- Coordinates: 35°37′14″N 82°32′32″W
- Built: 1913
- Architect: Fred Loring Seely
- Architectural style: Arts and Crafts
- NRHP reference No.: 73001295
- Added to NRHP: April 3, 1973

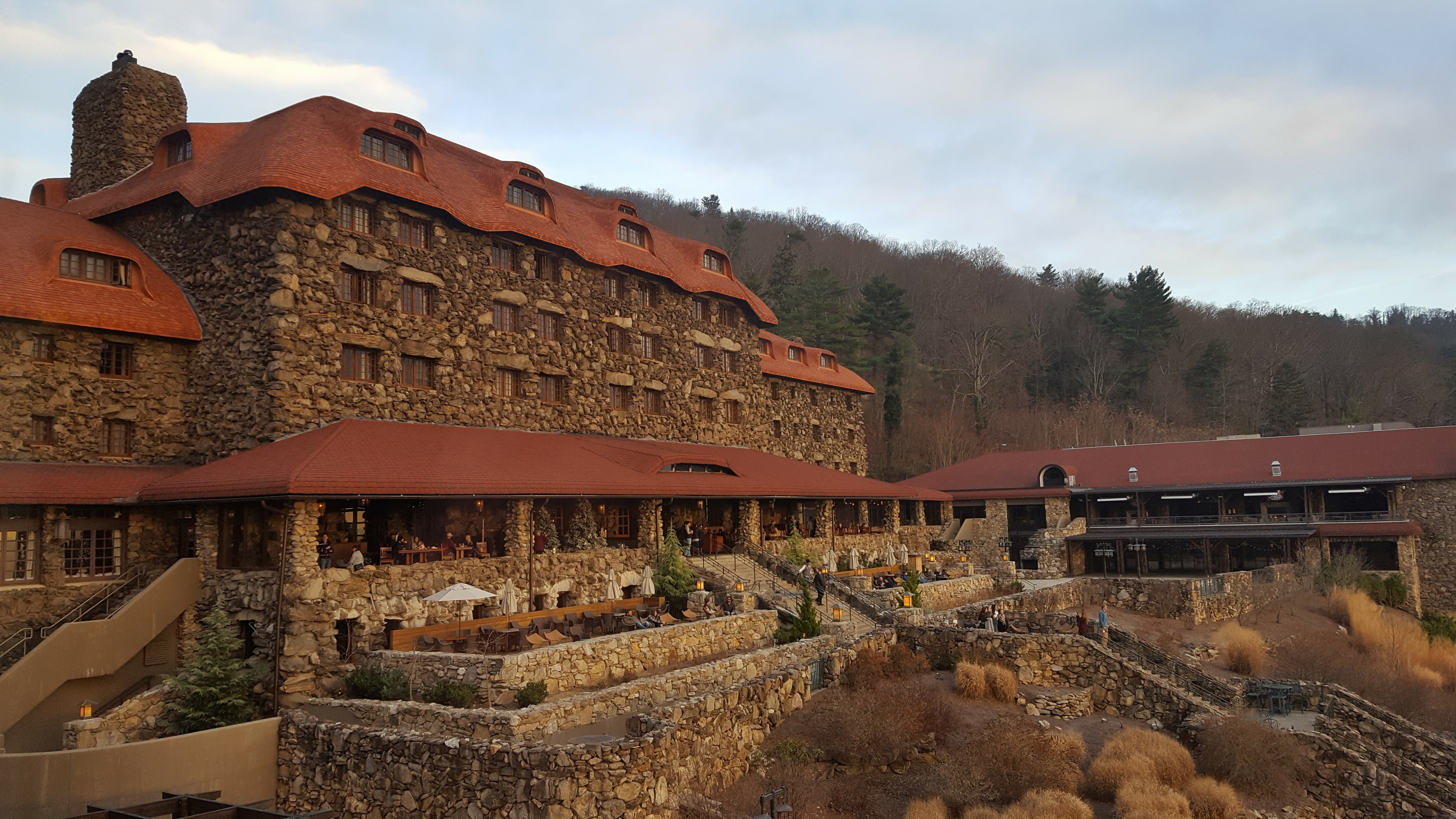
Sunset Terrace, 2016

The Grove Park Inn is a historic resort hotel on the western-facing slope of Sunset Mountain within the Blue Ridge Mountains, in Asheville, North Carolina. The hotel has been visited by various Presidents of the United States.

Listed on the National Register of Historic Places, the hotel was built in the Arts and Crafts style. The inn's 140 acres includes 513 guest rooms, 10 restaurants and bars, an 18-hole golf course, subterranean spa, 42 meeting rooms, two ballrooms, two swimming pools, and nine tennis courts. The Grove Park Inn is a member of the Historic Hotels of America program of the National Trust for Historic Preservation.

== History ==
In 1909, Edwin Wiley Grove and his son-in-law Fred Seely bought approximately 400 acres near Sunset Mountain to build a grand hotel. After rejecting plans from several prominent architects, Seely (who had no formal training in construction or architecture) made his own sketch of the hotel, which Grove approved of. The hotel was built in less than a year by workers housed in tents on the job site. It opened on July 12, 1913. Acting U.S. Secretary of State William Jennings Bryan gave the keynote speech.

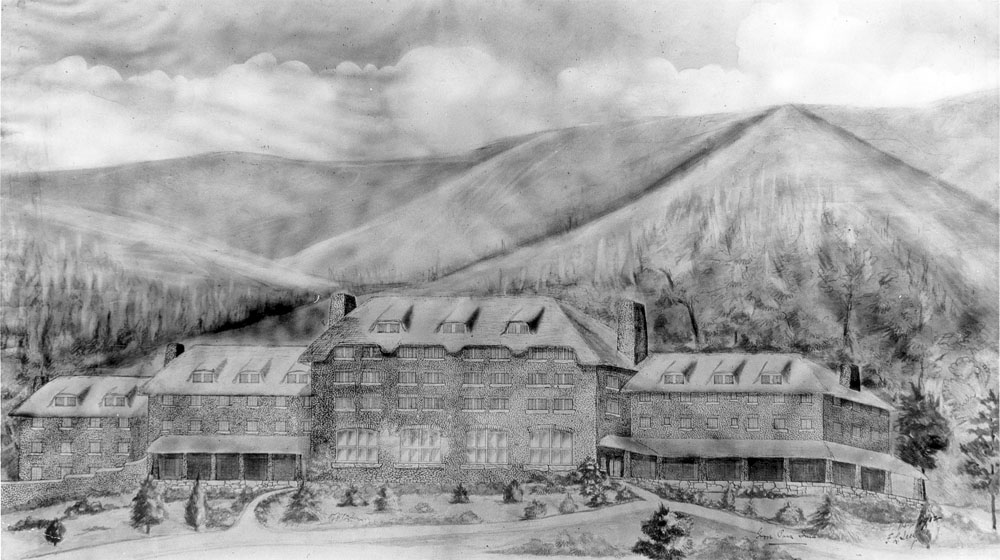
Sketch of the exterior of the Grove Park Inn by Fred Seely, 1912

The original inn had 156 guest rooms. The hotel was outfitted with furnishings from the Roycrofters of East Aurora, New York, and built of rough granite stones. It was advertised as having "walls five feet thick of granite boulders". The resort’s golf course predates the inn. With imposing views of the Blue Ridge Mountains, it was built in 1899 and redesigned by Donald Ross in 1924. In the 1920s a young lady fell from a fifth story balcony at the inn and died on the palm court floor. The "Pink Lady" is the most notable of the hotel's ghost stories.

During World War II, the inn was first used as an internment center for Axis diplomats. The diplomats and their staff were allowed guarded trips to town, where they would purchase goods from the local merchants. This was a boon to the strapped local economy. The inn was then used by the Navy as a rest and rehabilitation center for returning sailors. From 1944 to 1945, the hotel was an Army Redistribution Station where soldiers rested and relaxed before being assigned to other duties. The Philippine government functioned in exile from the Presidential Cottage (a replica of Anne Hathaway's Cottage) on the grounds during the war.

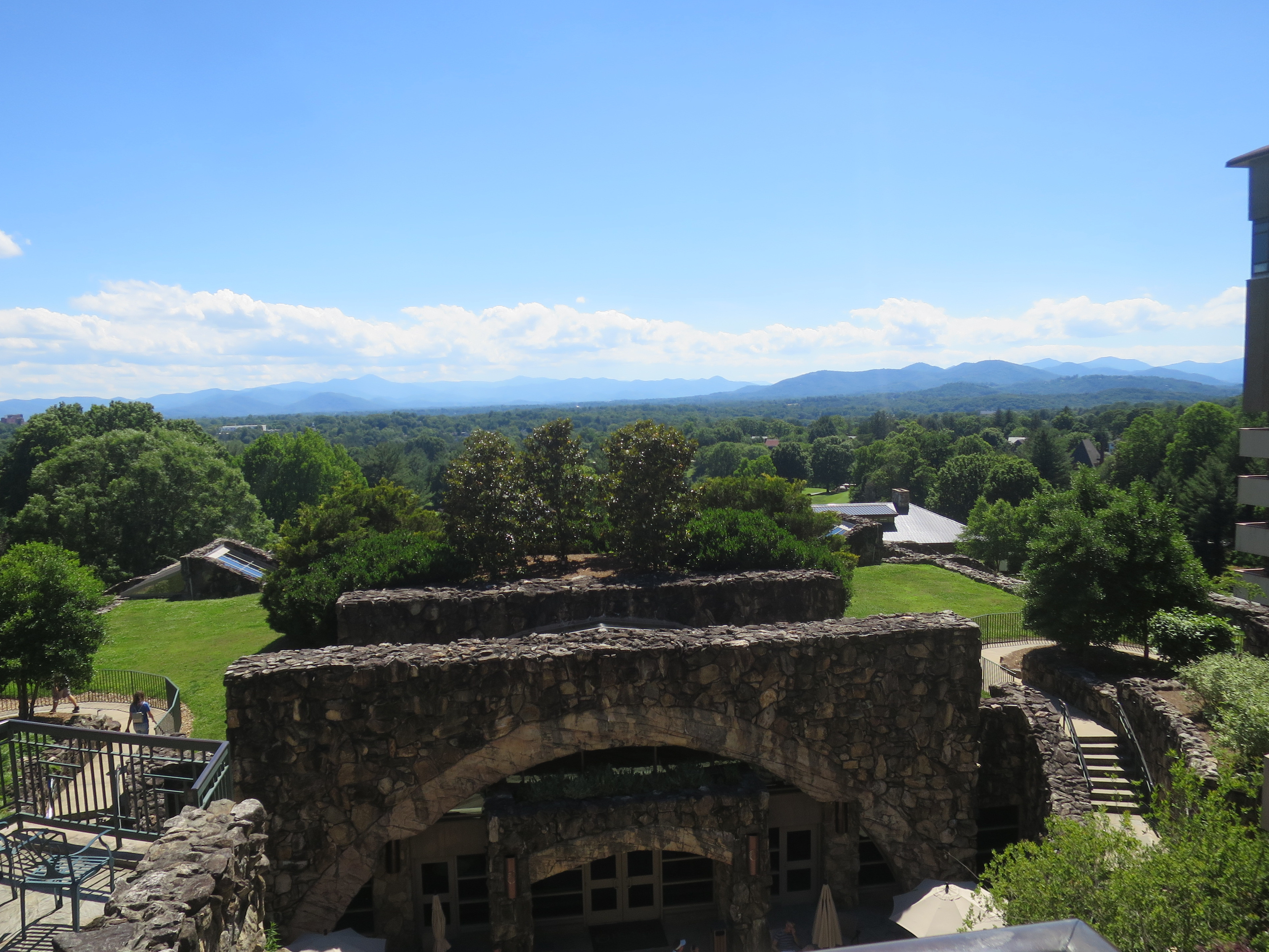
View from Grove Park Inn, facing southwest

William Howard Taft resigned from the United States Supreme Court in the resort's Great Hall in 1930. In the mid-1930s, F. Scott Fitzgerald and Zelda Fitzgerald moved to Asheville. Zelda would receive more formal care for her mental health while Scott lived at the inn for about a year, dealing with his mental health issues, heavy drinking, and tuberculosis. Scott penned the classic book, The Great Gatsby. Zelda was a creative person in her own right, including being a painter of note.

In the mid-1950s, during the Cold War era, the location was seriously considered as a bunker site for the U.S. Supreme Court. As of 2013, Supreme Court plans call for relocation to the Grove Park Inn in the event of a nuclear attack.

The Grove Park Inn became part of Sammons Enterprises in 1955. New owner Charles A. Sammons invested $100,000 in restoration work and the resort was expanded in 1958 and 1963. Sammons' wife Elaine occasionally snuck her dog into the hotel undercover in a baby carriage. Between 1982 and 1988, $65 million was spent to build a 50,000-square-foot sports center and the Sammons and Vanderbilt wings. The new wings more than tripled the amount of guest rooms at the property.

A $44 million, 3,700-square-metre (40,000 sq ft) spa was added to the property in 2001. The resort had 900 employees as of 2009. KSL Resorts acquired the Grove Park Inn in 2012 for $120 million and spent $25 million on renovation work. They resold it to Omni Hotels in 2013. Omni spent $25 million to rehabilitate the property and renamed it the Omni Grove Park Inn. In 2018, the inn opened the Seely Pavilion, a 10,000-square-foot event venue. In 2026, the inn held the international G20 Finance Track meeting, hosting more than 500 global financial leaders, including U.S. Treasury Secretary Scott Bessent and Federal Reserve Chairman Kevin Warsh.

=== Relationship to the Biltmore Estate ===
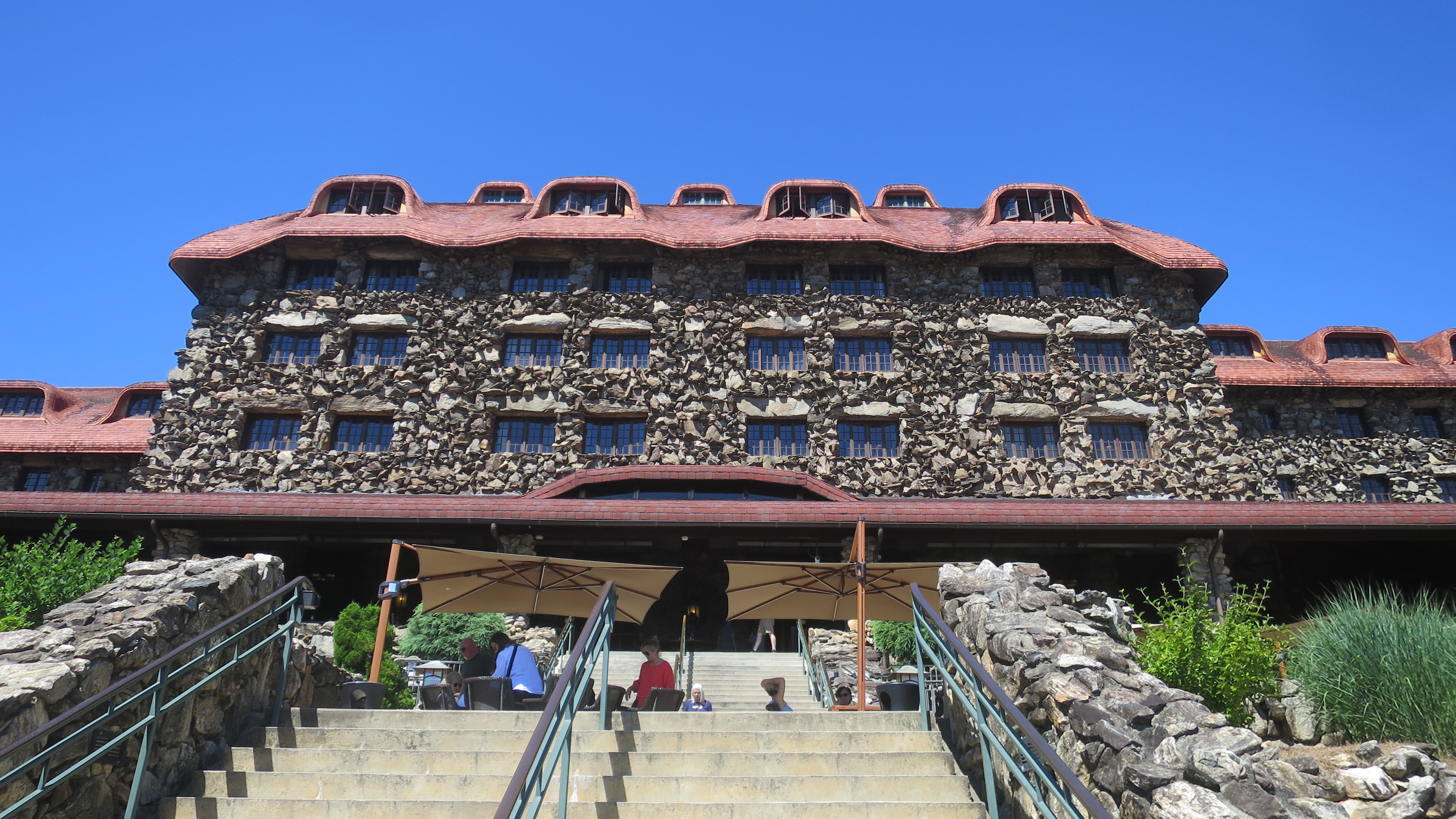
View of the back of the Grove Park Inn

In 1917, four years after the completion of the inn's construction, Fred L. Seely purchased Biltmore Estate Industries from Edith Vanderbilt, wife of George Washington Vanderbilt II. The new venture came in addition to his responsibilities as the manager of the Grove Park Inn. E.W. Grove, his father-in-law and owner of the Grove Park Inn, had refused to sell the hotel to Seely, though he had eagerly allowed him to construct the building. He instead leased the hotel to Seely to manage and he did so until 1927, the year of Grove's death and the year Seely lost his legal bid to own the hotel. Grove left his hotel to second wife Gertrude (d. 1928), son Eddie (d.1934) and daughter Evelyn (d.1953). Though Seely (d. 1942) was married to his daughter Evelyn, Grove made no concessions to Seely, and the inn passed into the hands of what one advertisement described as "more liberal management."

== National Gingerbread House Competition ==
In 1992, the National Gingerbread House Competition began at the Grove Park Inn with finalists' creations on display to the public (limited days, see details, below) in the halls each November and December. The event was canceled in 2024 due to the effects of Hurricane Helene when the resort closed for a month and a half due to hurricane-related flooding in Asheville. Like much of Asheville, the property lost power and water and experienced flooding. The Gingerbread House event returned in 2025. In the past, there was community discontent and some controversy when the inn started charging for parking and restricting access for the event. General details about the 2025 National Gingerbread House Competition can be seen below.

=== Public Viewing Details ===
- Viewing Dates: Late Nov - Early Jan
- Public Viewing Times: Generally after 6 p.m. Sundays or anytime Monday through Thursday (based on parking availability)
- Closed Dates: Generally, Thanksgiving day, December 7, December 23–26, and December 30–January 1
- Fridays & Saturdays: Reserved for registered resort guests and confirmed dining reservations only
- Capacity Note: During the Gingerbread season, access is subject to hotel capacity, including pedestrian traffic
- Pets: Only registered resort pets are permitted. No outside pets are allowed at the display

=== Holiday Parking ===
- Valet Parking: $45 for day parking & overnight guests
- Self-Parking: $35 for day parking & overnight guests

Information Hotline: For the latest Gingerbread updates, call (800) 413-5778

== Notable guests ==
=== U.S. Presidents ===
- William Howard Taft – 27th President of the United States, stayed in 1929 and 1930
- Woodrow Wilson – 28th President of the United States
- Calvin Coolidge – 30th President of the United States
- Herbert Hoover – 31st President of the United States
- Franklin D. Roosevelt – 32nd President of the United States, stayed in 1936
- Dwight D. Eisenhower – 34th President of the United States, stayed in 1947
- Richard Nixon – 37th President of the United States in 1956
- George H. W. Bush – 41st President of the United States in 1986
- Bill Clinton – 42nd President of the United States in 1987
- Barack Obama – 44th President of the United States, stayed in 2008 and 2010

=== Other visitors ===
Helen Keller was one of the inn’s first guests. Other notable visitors include F. Scott Fitzgerald and his wife Zelda, Henry Ford, Thomas Edison, Eleanor Roosevelt, John D. Rockefeller, Jerry Seinfeld, Sanjay Gupta, Harry Houdini, Will Rogers, Jack Nicklaus, George Gershwin, Margaret Mitchell, Billy Graham, Jennifer Lopez, Michael Jordan, William Shatner, and Don Cheadle.

== In literature ==
In Lee Smith's Guests on Earth: A Novel (which is about Zelda Fitzgerald and published in 2013), the central character often makes references to the Omni Grove Inn as the novel takes place in Asheville, North Carolina.

In Cormac McCarthy's 1979 novel Suttree (set in Knoxville), the title character and his girlfriend spend four days at the inn, staying in what McCarthy described as "a cool room high in the old rough pile of rocks."

Even as We Breathe by Annette Saunooke Clapsaddle.

== Accolades ==
- Travel + Leisure's 2008 Top 20 Hotel Spas

== See also ==
- List of Historic Hotels of America

== Sources ==
- The Grove Park Inn Story, 1984
- Johnson, Bruce E. Built for the Ages: A History of the Grove Park Inn, Grove Park Inn and Country Club: Asheville, NC, 1991
