= Undergraduate research =

Research partaken by undergraduate students

Undergraduate research is often described as the exploration of a specific research topic by an undergraduate student that seeks to make an original contribution to the discipline. It is a fairly recent concept in the academic community, with roots in the nineteenth and twentieth centuries. The creation of MIT's Undergraduate Research Opportunities Program (UROP) in 1969 encouraged an explosion in popularity. Undergraduate research programs were fairly common by the 1990s, and are currently accessible in many countries. Students may work on their own, collaborate with faculty members and other students, or seek enrollment in a research program within their field. Both faculty members and students experience advantages and disadvantages when collaborating on research. Although historically centered in the sciences, undergraduate research is now conducted in most fields. The research approach and preparation will differ depending on the disciplinary field and the specific research focus. Undergraduate research is often required for acceptance into graduate and professional schools.

== History ==
Undergraduate research has proliferated in higher education since the mid-twentieth century, although it has roots in early nineteenth and twentieth-century practice, particularly in Germany. In 1810, Wilhelm von Humboldt founded the University of Berlin, which created the model for undergraduate research. During the nineteenth century, many Americans pursued graduate education in Germany. Many Americans began to call for a transition towards the German education systems, with specialized disciplines and majors. This paved the way for undergraduate education. Mentions and praises of undergraduate research could be found in journals and magazines by the early 1900s and in 1912, the University of Chicago established the undergraduate research prize in memory of Howard Ricketts. In 1969, Margaret MacVicar established the Undergraduate Research Opportunities Program at MIT. It was considered the first Undergraduate Research Program. The Council on Undergraduate Research (CUR) was established in the United States in 1978 as a faculty development initiative; its headquarters are in Washington, DC. The National Conference on Undergraduate Research (NCUR) was formed in 1987 and hosted its first conference at University of North Carolina at Asheville. Recent NCUR events have attracted more than 3000 students. CUR and NCUR merged in 2010. Since the 1990s, many universities and colleges have instituted programs and offices meant to foster research at the undergraduate level.

== Global Representation ==
Undergraduate research is widespread globally and many international examples are presented in recent books edited by Hensel and Blessinger (2019), and Mieg, Ambos, Brew, Galli, and Lehmann (2022). In the Americas, undergraduate research is common in Canada and the United States and has a growing presence in countries in Central and South America. In Africa and the Middle East, undergraduate research has robust development in Egypt, Qatar, Saudi Arabia, and United Arab Emirates. With regard to Asia and Oceania, many nations are developing undergraduate research programs, with Australia and New Zealand hosting undergraduate research programs at multiple academic institutions. Within Europe, robust undergraduate research enterprises in Britain, Germany, the Netherlands, and several other countries have emerged.

In addition to the U.S. based CUR organization, several multinational organizations operate student research conferences and produce publications on a regular basis to serve the growing global undergraduate research community. Some examples are the Australasian Council for Undergraduate Research (ACUR) and the British Conference of Undergraduate Research (BCUR). International undergraduate research conferences have also arisen, chief examples of which are the International Conference of Undergraduate Research (ICUR), the Global Undergraduate Research Awards, and the World Congress on Undergraduate Research. The most recent World Congress took place at the University of Oldenburg from May 23-25, 2019. The 2023 World Congress on Undergraduate Research will be held at the University of Warwick.

== Value ==
Undergraduate research is defined broadly to include scientific inquiry, creative activity, and scholarship. An undergraduate research project might result in a musical composition, a work of art, an agricultural field experiment, or an analysis of historical documents. The key is that the project produces some original work. There are benefits to undergraduate research including, but not limited to, real world applications, research and professional experience, and better relationships with faculty and peers.

According to Heather Thiry, "Through coursework and out-of-class experiences, students described learning to work and think independently, to take responsibility for their own learning, and to take initiative to solve problems on their own rather than relying on experts for the answers." In addition, institutions find value in promoting undergraduate research to recruit and retain students and to prepare them for graduate studies. Undergraduate research "days" at state capitols is an effective way to showcase the effective of learning and teaching through research. The Council on Undergraduate Research (CUR) inspired many states to create state versions of its national Posters on the Hill event, which takes place each April in Washington, DC.

== Course-based Undergraduate Research ==
Undergraduate research has long occurred following an apprenticeship model, where a student trainee works directly or indirectly with a mentor on a project, increasingly there are also growing moves to integrate authentic research experiences directly into degree programs through Course-based Undergraduate Research (CUREs). Unlike traditional models, which typically are accessible to only a small fraction of enrolled students at an institution, CUREs have the potential to include all students participating in a course in the process of asking and answering novel scientific questions.

With a focus on asking meaningful questions and involving students in authentic science, CUREs have been developed with a focus on laboratory-based research and for field settings in biology education. They have also been developed across chemistry, geology, and social sciences.

CUREs have been demonstrated to provide numerous benefits to undergraduate students, improving their ability to think critically, interpret evidence, and understand topical material. Studies also suggest that CUREs have the potential to improve the science identity of students and enhance their career readiness.

== Disciplinary variations ==
Undergraduate research continues to broaden and diversify from its historic core in Science, Technology, Engineering, and Mathematics (STEM) fields. Publications in STEM fields such as Chemistry, Mathematics, and Psychology, as well as many peer-reviewed articles in other STEM areas provide specific undergraduate research strategies in a variety of STEM disciplines. Publications in non-STEM disciplines have grown, as shown by publications in arts and humanities, health sciences, and education.

Research methods vary depending on the field of study in which a student participates. These fields of study are more commonly divided into humanities and sciences. Humanities include, but are not limited to, fields such as history, literature, philosophy, and the performing arts. Sciences include physics, biology, psychology, and chemistry.

=== Humanities ===
The undergraduate research in humanities generally promotes the same values as that in the sciences. Such values include collaboration, unique thought, and interdisciplinary works. It differs from the sciences in that it is based more on theoretical research than laboratory research. For example, undergraduate research in the performing arts consists of the developing of new performing pieces as experimentation. Though not viewed as research in the traditional sense, this is a form of experimentation. Because of this differentiation, this field of undergraduate research is not as well funded as it is for the sciences. Also, there are many college students interested in studying the humanities; in actuality, more STEM-related majors take humanities courses than humanities-related majors take STEM courses.

Universities have used course-based research since 1998, but few have applied it to the humanities. However, they have increasingly done so with time. For example, since 2001, the University of Washington has established a lecture-discussion panel as well as an annual Undergraduate Research Symposium and Summer Institute with the purpose of supporting undergraduate research in the humanities; it does so through providing incentives such as funding for research. Volumes on research in specific humanities disciplines have begun to appear, particularly in English and religious studies.

=== Sciences ===
The science disciplines are more lab-oriented than the humanities, although fieldwork can occasionally play an important role in the research process.

==== Chemistry ====
Undergraduate research can be done through self-directed experiments under the guidance of an advisor. Most work is completed in the lab because chemists learn by working in the lab and experience is gained with the lab equipment. The students gain a greater understanding of the material while advances are made in science.

==== Biology ====
Undergraduate research in biology is a combination of working in the laboratory and in the environment for the purpose of better understanding the world around us.

==== Physics ====
Undergraduate research for the field of physics is often hands-on and practical. Students tend to focus on the "why-nots" and the "what-ifs."

==== Geology ====
Undergraduate work in the geology field has strong ties to both climatology and environmental sciences. While work takes place in the lab for analysis, there is also work to be done in the field such as studying fossilized remains, minerals, or other geologic formations to better understand trends in the past and the future.

== Students ==
Undergraduate research provides opportunities for independent research, professional student/teacher relationships, and experience in the field of study. Undergraduate research is a tool for students to gain knowledge about their field using their own methods and not relying on a professor or supervisor to walk them through the study. Independent research helps students feel confident and competent when performing tasks in their future career. The results of undergraduate research can sometimes be published in peer-reviewed venues, such as an undergraduate research journal dedicated specifically to such work, or in traditional academic journals with the student as a coauthor.

Both students and faculty recognize the benefits of undergraduate research. Faculty from Harvey Mudd College, Wellesley College, and Grinnell College were surveyed, and listed benefits such as opportunities to work and think independently, learning through reading literature and communication, increased problem solving skills, and an appreciation of what scientists do. Student responses from this study included an enhancement of professional or academic credentials, as well as the clarification of a career path. The author of this study stated that the "benefits [students] value result from a good relationship with and expert guidance from a mentor." The greatest benefit to both professor and student is believed to be the personal guidance and knowledge shared between the two.

Many graduate programs and professional schools require undergraduate research. For example, admissions boards for medical schools look for research experience when admitting students. Therefore, not only will pre-medical students benefit from learning how to apply hypothesis-based research, but they will also be more likely to be accepted to medical school if they have participated in undergraduate research. This holds true for graduate programs in a variety of subjects.

== Faculty ==
Faculty members involved in undergraduate research perform two different roles. Faculty members may act as primary researchers who lead the investigation and provide support for students, and in other circumstances, undergraduate research is led by the student. In this case, the faculty member acts as an advisor to keep students on track and provide assistance when needed.

=== Advantages ===
Undergraduate involvement in research may increase efficiency as well as provide other skill sets. In institutions that focus on their professors' role as teachers, administrators reward faculty members' involvement in undergraduate research. Some faculty members report, according to Scott Windham, that working with students on undergraduate research gives them the personal satisfaction of helping students grow and professionally develop. Showcasing students' research at undergraduate conferences highlights the hard work of the students and their faculty mentors.

Faculty members might also become better teachers due to their work on cutting-edge research. Colleges may also assess undergraduate research as part of departmental productivity. Taking part in undergraduate research can help faculty members in the long run because the students they work with can train future undergraduate researchers. Colleges might also provide more funding to faculty research if they work with undergraduate students.

=== Disadvantages ===
According to Scott Windham, "Publication may be limited to second tier journals if an undergraduate student is listed as a co-author." As a result, in some institutions, working with undergraduate students can negatively affect tenure and promotion opportunities. Some observers report fear that undergraduate research may exploit students in order to promote the faculty member's career. In addition, faculty members perceive that research with students may keep them from conducting their own research, will require more time or resources, or will not help them with their professional development. Many faculty members do not receive teaching credit for mentoring undergraduate research, nor do they receive any other types of rewards, incentives, or compensation. A problem also arises when the student is not prepared properly or if the student is not sufficiently motivated.

== See also ==
- List of undergraduate research journals
- Research
- Research Experiences for Undergraduates
- Undergraduate education
- Undergraduate research journal
- Undergraduate Research Opportunities Program
