= Neal B. Abraham =

American physicist

- Occupations: Scientist, professor, academic

Academic background
- Education: Dickinson College; Bryn Mawr College (PhD)

Academic work
- Discipline: Physics
- Institutions: Swarthmore College; Bryn Mawr College; DePauw University; Five College Consortium
- Main interests: Nonlinear dynamics, chaos, lasers

Neal B. Abraham is an American physicist, in 2018 retired from his position as executive director at the Five College Consortium, a position he held beginning in 2009. He is a member of the board of directors of the Association for Collaborative Leadership (ACL). Prior to his work at the Five Colleges, he was executive vice president of DePauw University and prior to that, a Physics Professor and department chair at Bryn Mawr College. Abraham has been a leader in developing physics undergraduate research at Bryn Mawr, DePauw, and the Five Colleges. His research is on nonlinear dynamics, chaos, and lasers. He is an elected fellow of American Association for the Advancement of Science and two major physics societies.

== Education ==
Neal Abraham received his BS in physics in 1972 at Dickinson College. He was awarded the PhD in physics from Bryn Mawr College in 1977.

== Academic career ==
Abraham began his career with an appointment to the physics department at Swarthmore College in 1977–1980. He then moved to the physics faculty at Bryn Mawr College where from 1980 to 1987 he rose through the professorial ranks and served as department chair. Then he accepted a position as vice president for academic affairs and dean of the Faculty, professor of physics and astronomy at DePauw University. In 2009, he was appointed executive director of the Five College Consortium, from which position he retired in 2018.

Abraham has been a leader nationally in physics undergraduate research. He was a founding member of Project Kaleidoscope and National Conference on Undergraduate Research and served as president of the Council on Undergraduate Research. He was a member of the board of the Association for Collaborative Leadership (ACL) and cofounded their summer institutes for leadership in higher education.

== Honors and awards ==
- NAACP Citizen of the Year in the Greencastle community 2009
- Trustee of Dickinson College 2009-present
- Fellow of the American Association for the Advancement of Science
- Fellow of the Optical Society of America
- Fellow of the American Physical Society
- Elected to Sigma Xi, the Scientific Honor Society
