= Ken Kamrin =

American applied mathematician

- Occupation: Mechanical Engineer

Academic background
- Education: BS., Engineering Physics; PhD., Applied Mathematics
- Alma mater: University of California Berkeley; Massachusetts Institute of Technology
- Thesis: Stochastic and Deterministic Models for Dense Granular Flow (2008)
- Doctoral advisor: Martin Z. Bazant

Academic work
- Institutions: Massachusetts Institute of Technology; University of California Berkeley

Kenneth Norman Kamrin is an American applied mathematician and mechanical engineer. He serves as the Chair of Engineering Science and Professor of Mechanical Engineering at University of California, Berkeley.

Kamrin’s research focuses on constitutive modeling and computational mechanics for large deformation processes spanning elastic and plastic solid modeling, granular mechanics, amorphous solid mechanics, and fluid-structure interaction.

== Education ==
Kamrin received a BS in engineering physics with a minor in mathematics from the University of California Berkeley in 2003. Kamrin received his PhD in applied mathematics from the Massachusetts Institute of Technology (MIT) in 2008 for his work on stochastic and deterministic models for dense granular flows with Martin Bazant.

== Academic career ==
Kamrin began his academic career as an applied mathematics lecturer and NSF Postdoctoral Fellow in the School of Engineering and Applied Sciences at Harvard University in 2008. Kamrin joined the faculty of the Massachusetts Institute of Technology in the Mechanical Engineering department in 2011, where he later served as the Class of 1956 Career Development Chair and also received a second faculty appointment in Applied Mathematics. After serving as a professor at MIT for 13 years, Kamrin joined the University of California Berkeley as a Mechanical Engineering professor in 2024 where he was appointed the Chair of Engineering Science in 2025.

Kamrin has also frequently taught and spoken on the subject of mechanics. He has provided commentary for the National Geographic channel, was the subject of a New-England-Emmy nominated film on granular media, and gave the 10-university Midwest Mechanics Seminar tour in 2025. Kamrin received MIT's highest honor in undergraduate education, the MacVicar Fellowship, in 2022.

== Research ==
Kamrin's research focuses on continuum mechanics and the modeling of granular, deformable, and multiphase materials. His work combines constitutive modeling, theoretical mechanics, and computational methods to relate microscopic material behavior to macroscopic deformation and flow.

A major area of his research is granular rheology. Kamrin has developed non-local continuum models for dense granular flow that incorporate finite spatial interactions into constitutive descriptions. These models have been used to describe many different flow regimes, including localized deformation and transitions between flowing and arrested states. His research has also examined the effects of particle size and characteristic length scales on granular rheology and the scaling of granular behavior across different flow geometries. Kamrin has investigated continuum models for systems containing interacting granular and fluid phases, including fluid–sediment mixtures and non-Newtonian fine-particle suspensions. These multi-phase models treat the constituent phases as coupled continua and seek to describe multiple regimes of particulate transport within a common framework. Another area of his research concerns the mechanics of solid objects moving through granular materials. His work on granular intrusion has examined the forces acting on bodies moving through granular media and developed reduced descriptions of these forces. Related studies have considered locomotion in granular materials, terramechanics, and the interaction between moving bodies and granular terrains on earth and beyond.

Kamrin has also developed computational methods for materials undergoing large deformation, including the Reference Map Technique for finite-deformation mechanics and methods coupling discrete and continuum descriptions of particulate materials. A recurring theme of this work is the development of continuum and reduced-order models that capture macroscopic material behavior without requiring all microscopic degrees of freedom to be explicitly resolved.

== Awards and honors ==
- MIT MacVicar Faculty Fellowship (2022)
- ASME Journal of Applied Mechanics Award (2016)
- Eshelby Mechanics Award for Young Faculty (2015)
- NSF Early Faculty Career Development (CAREER) Award (2012)
- APS Nicholas Metropolis Award (2010)
- NSF Mathematical Sciences Postdoctoral Research Fellowship (2009)
- National Defense Science and Engineering Graduate Fellowship (2005)
- NSF Graduate Research Fellowship (2005)
- Hertz Fellowship (2003)

== Selected publications ==
- Introduction to Mechanics of Solid Materials (Textbook), L Anand, K Kamrin, and S Govindjee, Oxford University Press (2022)
- Nonlocal constitutive relation for steady granular flow. K Kamrin, G Koval Physical Review Letters 108 (17), 178301 (2012)
- Reference map technique for finite-strain elasticity and fluid–solid interaction. K Kamrin, CH Rycroft, JC Nave. Journal of the Mechanics and Physics of Solids 60 (11), 1952-1969 (2012)
- A predictive, size-dependent continuum model for dense granular flows. DL Henann, K Kamrin. Proceedings of the National Academy of Sciences 110 (17), 6730-6735 (2013)
- Nonlocal modeling of granular flows down inclines. K Kamrin, DL Henann. Soft Matter 11 (1), 179-185 (2014)
- Continuum modelling and simulation of granular flows through their many phases. S Dunatunga, K Kamrin. Journal of Fluid Mechanics 779, 483-513 (2015)
- Intrusion rheology in grains and other flowable materials. H Askari, K Kamrin. Nature Materials 15 (12), 1274-1279 (2016)
- Hybrid grains: Adaptive coupling of discrete and continuum simulations of granular media. Y Yue, B Smith, PY Chen, M Chantharayukhonthorn, K Kamrin, Eitan Grinspun. ACM Transactions on Graphics (TOG) 37 (6), 1-19 (2018)
- A general fluid–sediment mixture model and constitutive theory validated in many flow regimes. AS Baumgarten, K Kamrin Journal of Fluid Mechanics 861, 721-764 (2019)
- Surprising simplicity in the modeling of dynamic granular intrusion. S Agarwal, A Karsai, DI Goldman, K Kamrin. Science Advances 7 (17), eabe0631 (2021)
- Grain shape effects in bed load sediment transport. E Deal, JG Venditti, SJ Benavides, R Bradley, Q Zhang, K Kamrin, J Taylor Perron Nature 613 (7943), 298-302 (2023)
