= Zdeněk P. Bažant =

Czech-American civil engineer (born 1937)

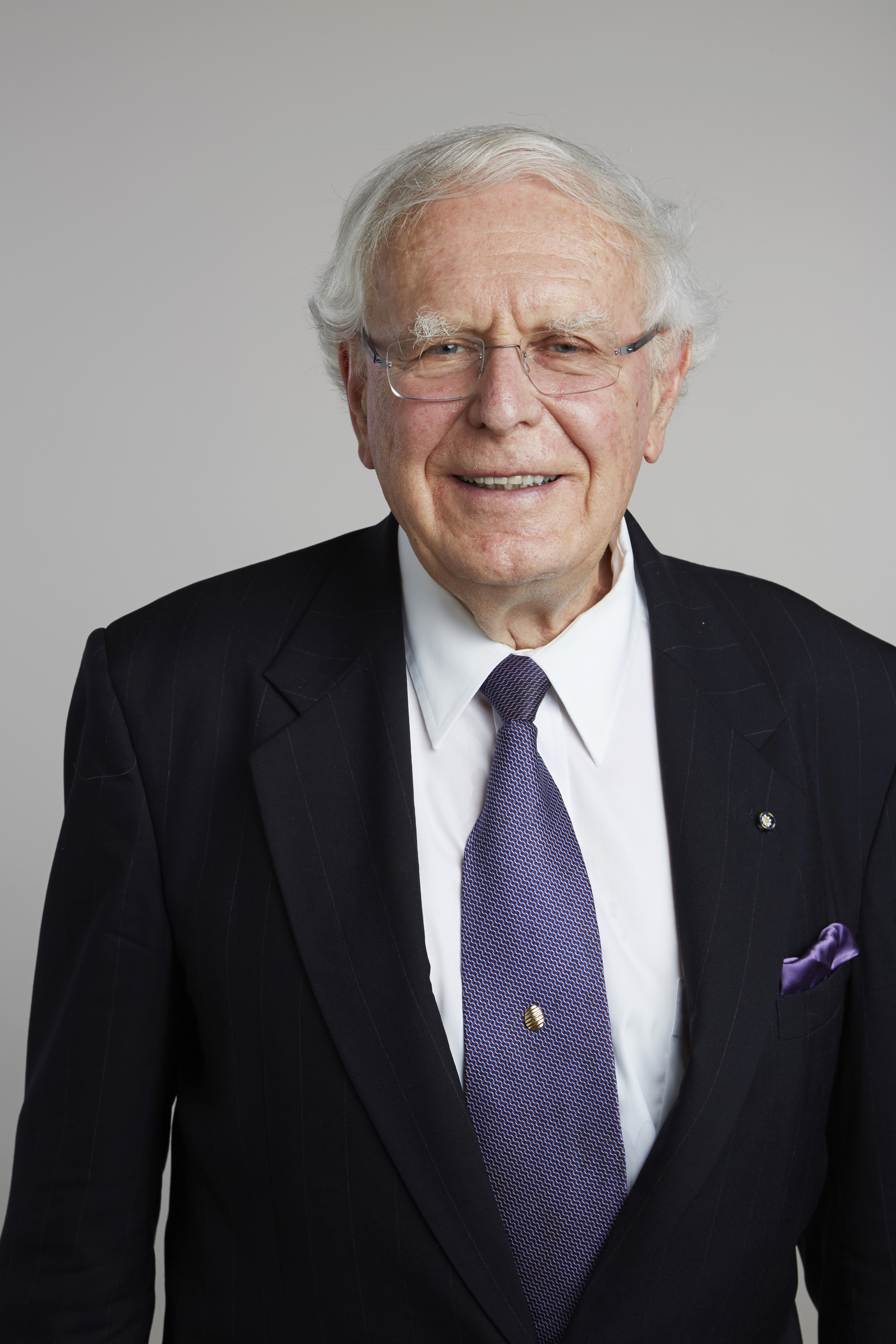
- Born: December 10, 1937 (age 88)
- Education: Czech Technical University; Czechoslovak Academy of Sciences; Charles University
- Occupations: professor, engineer, scientist
- Employer: Northwestern University
- Awards: Austrian Cross of Honor; von Karman Medal; Timoshenko Medal; Prager Medal; Nadai Medal, etc.
- Website: www.civil.northwestern.edu/people/bazant/

Zdeněk Pavel Bažant (born December 10, 1937) is McCormick School Professor and Walter P. Murphy Professor of Civil Engineering and Materials Science in the Department of Civil and Environmental Engineering at Northwestern University's Robert R. McCormick School of Engineering and Applied Science.

== Education, career and academic positions ==
Born in Prague, Czechoslovakia, on December 10, 1937, Bažant received the degree of Civil Engineer from the Czech Technical University (CTU) in Prague in 1960. While employed as bridge designer he earned in 1963 (as an external student) a PhD in engineering mechanics from the Czechoslovak Academy of Sciences; in 1966, he earned a postgraduate diploma in theoretical physics from Charles University, Prague. During 1964–67 he was research assistant professor at CTU working on fiber composites, and obtained the degree of Docent habilitatis in concrete structures from CTU in 1967. After postdoctoral fellowship at CEBTP Paris (1966–67) and Ford Foundation fellowship at University of Toronto (1967–68), he was during 1968–69 associate research engineer at the University of California, Berkeley. Following the Soviet invasion of Czechoslovakia, he decided not to return home and in 1969 he joined Northwestern University as an associate professor.

At Northwestern University, Bažant became professor of civil engineering in 1973. During 1981–87 he served as the founding director of Center for Geomaterials. During 1974-1994 he was simultaneously a staff consultant at Argonne National Laboratory. Since 1990, he has held the Walter P. Murphy Chair in Civil and Mechanical Engineering and Materials Science, and since 2002 simultaneously the chair of McCormick Institute Professor. Bažant served as the president of the Society of Engineering Science (1993); was the founding president (1991–93) of the International Association of Fracture Mechanics of Concrete Structures (IA-FRAMCOS); and the founding president (2001–2002) of the International Association of Concrete Creep and Durability Mechanics (IA-CONCREEP). He served as division director in IA-SMiRT (Structural Mechanics in Reactor Technology), as member of the U. S. National Committee for Theoretical and Applied Mechanics, and as editor-in-chief of Journal of Engineering Mechanics of the American Society of Civil Engineers (ASCE). He has been the US regional editor of International Journal of Fracture.

== Research contributions and impact ==
Bažant, who is "generally regarded as the world leader in research on scaling in the mechanics of solids", is the author of nine books dealing with concrete creep, stability of structures, fracture and size effect, inelastic analysis, scaling of structural strength and probabilistic mechanics of quasi-brittle structures. His size effect law (1984) is incorporated into shear design provisions of ACI Standard 318 (2019). His size effect method for measuring fracture energy and process zone size in concrete became RILEM Standard Recommendation in 1990. His B3 and B4 prediction models for concrete creep and shrinkage became RILEM Standard Recommendation in 1995 and 2015. His nonlinear diffusion model for moisture in concrete is part of European Model Code. His AAAM procedure is part of Standard recommendation of ACI and Model Code. His microplane model for material damage and his crack band model for fracture have been widely adopted in civil engineering industry, for impact analysis, and for fracture assessment of large composite airframes. His exponential algorithm became standard in creep analysis of concrete nuclear containments. His invention of gap test is impacting fracture mechanics. His invention of finite chain statistics and fishnet probability distribution is impacting statistical strength predictions. He is an Illinois registered Structural Engineer, and is one of the original top 100 ISI highly cited researchers in engineering (of all fields, worldwide). As of May 2024, his h-index according to Google Scholar is 151, i10-index 709, and total citations 95,868. In 2019 Stanford Univ. citation survey of >250,000 engineering authors (weighted for first and last author and number of co-authors, filtered for reciprocal citations and citation farms), he was ranked worldwide no.1 in civil engineering and no.2 in engineering of all fields; ditto in a similar survey by Elsevier in 2022.

== Honors and awards ==
Bažant was elected to US National Academy of Sciences in 2002, US National Academy of Engineering in 1996, and American Academy of Arts and Sciences in 2008. He is a foreign member of the Royal Society of London (2015), Austrian Academy of Sciences, Academy of Engrg. of Czech Rep., Italian National Academy (dei Lincei, Rome), Spanish Royal Academy of Engineering, Academy of Athens, First Section (2017), Indian National Academy of Engineering, Engineering Academy of Japan, Turin Academy, Istituto Lombardo, Milan (2002), Academia Europaea (London) (2014), and European Academy of Science and Arts. His honors include 9 honorary doctorates: CTU Prague (1991), TU Karlsruhe (Fredericiana, 1997), CU Boulder (2000), Politecnico di Milano (2001), INSA Lyon (2004), TU Vienna (2006), Ohio State University (2011), University of Minnesota (2013) and UPPA Bayonne-Anglet (2013). He is an honorary member of Am. Soc. of Mechanical Engineers (ASME), Am. Soc. of Civil Engineers (ASCE), Am. Concrete Institute (ACI), RILEM, Paris (Int. Union of Res. Lab. In Mat. & Str.), Czech Soc. of Mechanics, Czech Soc. of Civil Engineers, Czech Concrete Society, and Building Res. Institute of Spain. His honors include:

- Murray Medal & Lecture from SES (Soc. for Experimental Mechanics) 2023
- Outstanding Research Award from ACS (Am. Soc. for Composites) 2022
- Freudenthal Medal (2018, ASCE)
- ASME Medal, (2017, ASME)
- Austrian Cross of Honor for Science and Art I Class from President of Austria (2016, from President of Austria)
- Elected a Foreign Member of the Royal Society, London (ForMemRS) in 2015
- Mindlin Medal (2015, ASCE)
- Biot Medal (2011, ASCE)
- Timoshenko Medal (2009, ASME)
- Nadai Medal (2008, ASME)
- Wilhelm Exner Medal (2008, Austria Gov.-Industry Assoc., awarded by President of Austria)
- von Karman Medal (2005, ASCE)
- Newmark Medal (1996, ASCE)
- Worcester Reed Warner Medal (1997, ASME)
- Croes Medal (1997, ASCE)
- Prager Medal (1996, Soc. of Engrg. Science, SES)
- Lifetime Achievement Award (2003, ASCE IL Section)
- W.L. Huber Prize (1976, ASCE)
- TY Lin Award (1977, ASCE)
- D.M. Roy Award (2001, Am. Ceramic Society, ACS)
- L'Hermite Gold Medal (1975, RILEM, Paris)
- Best Engineering Book of the Year (1992, Assoc. of Amer. Publishers)
- ISI Award of Highly Cited Scientist in Engrg. (2011)
- Šolín Medal (1998, CTU Prague)
- Medal of Czech Soc. for Mech. (1993, Prague)
- Stodola Gold Medal (1999, Bratislava)
- Zdenek Bažant Sr. Medal (2007, CTU Prague)
- Outstanding Contributions Award (2008, IACMAG)
- ICOSSAR Lecture Award (2001)
- Publication Merit Award (1992, 1998, SEAOI)
- Outstanding paper award (2016 and 2018)
- Sci. & Techn. Price from Ministry of Water Resources and Electr. Power, China (1984)
- Guggenheim Fellowship, 1978
- A. von Humboldt Award of Senior U.S. Scientist (1990, Germany)
- JSPS Fellowship, Tokyo, 1996
- Kajima Foundation Fellowship, Tokyo, 1987
- NATO Senior Scientist Fellowship, France, 1988
- Outstanding New Citizen, Chicago Citizenship Council 1975
- National Winner, Mathematical Olympics of Czechoslovakia 1955

In 2023, ASME created Zdenek P Bažant Medal for Contributions to Mechanics. In 2015, ASCE established "Zdenek P. Bazant Medal for Failure and Damage Prevention" In 2011, Czech Society for Mechanics established " Z.P. Bazant Prize for Engineering Mechanics"

PATENTS: 5, including 1959 Safety Ski Binding, Czechoslovakia (exhibited in New England Ski Museum, Franconia, NH)

== Selected publications ==
=== Books ===
- Bažant, Zdeněk P. (1966). Creep of Concrete in Structural Analysis (in Czech), State Publishers of Technical Literature (SNTL), Prague.
- Bažant, Z.P., and Cedolin, L. (1991). Stability of Structures: Elastic, Inelastic, Fracture and Damage Theories, Oxford University Press, New York; 2nd. ed. Dover Publications, New York 2003; 3rd ed. World Scientific Publishing, Singapore—New Jersey—London 2010.
- Bažant, Z.P., and Kaplan, M.F. (1996). Concrete at High Temperatures: Material Properties and Mathematical Models, Longman; 2nd ed. Pearson Education, Edinburgh, 2002.
- Bažant, Z.P., and Planas, J. (1998). Fracture and Size Effect in Concrete and Other Quasibrittle Materials, CRC Press, Boca Raton and London
- Jirásek, M., Z.P. Bažant (2002). Inelastic Analysis of Structures, J. Wiley & Sons, London and New York.
- Bažant, Z.P. (2002). Scaling of Structural Strength, Hermes Penton Science (Kogan Page Science), London; 2nd updated ed., Elsevier, London 2005.
- Bažant, Z.P., and Le, Jia-Liang (2017). Probabilistic Mechanics of Quasibrittle Structures: Strength, Lifetime, and Size Effect, Cambridge University Press, Cambridge, U.K. (ISBN 978-1-107-15170-3).
- Bažant, Z.P., and Jirásek, M. (2018). Creep and Hygrothermal Effects in Concrete Structures, Springer, Dordrecht, Netherlands (ISBN 978-9-40-241138-6, ISBN 978-9-40-241136-2).
- Bažant, Z.P., Le, Jia-Liang, and Salviato, M. (2022). Quasibrittle Fracture Mechanics and Size Effect, Oxford University Press, U.K.

=== Papers ===
- Z.P. Bažant and B.-H. Oh (1983). "Crack band theory for fracture of concrete." Materials and Structures (RILEM) 16: 155-177 (>2600 cit. on Google by 2016; though journal not scanned by ISI prior to 1995).
- Z.P. Bažant (1984). "Size effect in blunt fracture: Concrete, rock, metal". ASCE J. of Engrg. Mechanics 110: 518–535.
- G. Pijaudier-Cabot and Z.P. Bažant, Z.P. (1987). "Nonlocal damage theory." ASCE J. of Engrg. Mechanics, 113 (10): 1512—1533
- Z.P. Bažant and G. Pijaudier-Cabot (1988). "Nonlocal continuum damage, localization instability and convergence." ASME J. of Applied Mechanics, 55, 287—293
- Z.P Bažant (1988). Mathematical Modeling of Creep and Shrinkage of Concrete (editor, wrote two chapters), J. Wiley, Chichester
- Z.P. Bažant, T. Belytschko and T.-P. Chang (1984). "Continuum theory for strain softening." ASCE Journal of Engineering Mechanics, 110 (1984): 1666-1692
- Z.P. Bažant (1976). "Instability, ductility, and size effect in strain softening concrete". ASCE Journal of Engineering Mechanics 102: 331–344.
- Z.P. Bažant and M. Jirásek (2002). "Nonlocal integral formulations of plasticity and damage." ASCE J. of Engrg. Mechanics 128: 1119–1149.
- Z.P. Bažant and L.F. Estenssoro (1979). "Surface singularity and crack propagation." Int. J. of Solids and Structures 15: 405–426.
- Z.P. Bažant and M.T. Kazemi (1990). "Determination of fracture energy, process zone length and brittleness number from size effect, with application to rock and concrete." Int. J. of Fracture, 44: 111–131.

=== Recent papers ===
- Z.P. Bažant, M. Salviato et al. (2014). "Why fracking works." ASME J. of Applied Mechanics 81 (Oct.), 101010-1-101010-10 (posted on www.iMechanica.com; >2000 downloads within 3 weeks).
- Z.P. Bažant and F.C. Caner (2014). "Impact comminution of solids due to local kinetic energy of high shear strain rate: I. Continuum theory and turbulence analogy." J. of the Mechanics and Physics of Solids 64, 223–235.
- F.C. Caner and Z.P. Bažant (2013). "Microplane model M7 for plain concrete: I. formulation." ASCE J. of Engrg. Mechanics 139 (12), Dec., 1714–1723.
- Z.P. Bažant and J. Vorel (2014). "Energy-conservation error due to use of Green-Naghdi objective stress rate in commercial finite-element codes and its compensation." ASME J. of Applied Mechanics 81 (Feb.), pp. 021008–1 -- 121008–5.
- J.-L. Le and Z.P. Bažant (2014). "Finite weakest-link model of lifetime distribution ofquasibrittle structures under fatigue loading." Mathematics and Mechanics of Solids 19(1), 56–70.
- Bazant, Z.P., and Su, Yewang (2015). "Impact comminution of solids due to progressive crack growth driven by kinetic energy of high-rate shear." ASME J. of Applied Mechanics 82 (March), pp. 031007–1--031007-5.
- Kirane, K., and Bažant, Z.P. (2016). "Size effect in Paris law and fatigue lifetimes for quasibrittle materials: Modified theory, experiments and micro-modeling." Int. J. of Fatigue 83, 209–220.
- Kirane, K., Salviato, M. and Bažant, Z.P. (2016). "Microplane-triad model for elastic and fracturing behavior of woven composites." Journal of Applied Mechanics ASME 83 (April), pp. 041006–1---041006-14 %(doi: 10.1115/1.4032275]).
- Salviato, M., Chau, Viet T., Li, Weixin, Bažant, Z.P., and Cusatis, G. (2016). "Direct testing of gradual postpeak softening of fracture specimens of fiber composites stabilized by enhanced grip stiffness and mass." J. of Applied Mechanics ASME 83 (Nov.) 111003-1---111003-16; doi:10.1115/1.4034312.
- Bažant, Z.P., Luo, Wen, Chau, Viet T., and Bessa, M.A. (2016). "Wave dispersion and basic concepts of peridynamics compared to classical nonlocal models." J. of Applied Mechanics ASME 83 (Nov.) 111004-1---111004-16 (doi: 10.1115/1.4034319).
- Chau, Viet T., Bažant. Z.P., and Su, Yewang (2016). "Growth model for large branched 3D hydraulic crack system in gas or oil shale." Philosophical Transactions of Royal Society A 374 (issue 2078, Oct.), pp. ... (doi: 10.1098/rsta.2015.0418).
- Bažant, Z.P., and Rahimi-Aghdam, S. (2016). "Diffusion-controlled and creep-mitigated ASR damage via microplane model: I. Mass concrete". J. of Engineering Mechanics ASCE 142 (10); pp. 04016108–1--04016108-10; DOI: 10.1061/(ASCE)EM.1943-7889.0001186.
- Rahimi-Aghdam, S., Bažant, Z.P., and Qomi, M.J.A. (2017). "Cement hydration from hours to centuries controlled by diffusion through barrier shells of C-S-H." J. of the Mechanics and Physics of Solids 99, 211–224.
- Chau, Viet.T., Li, Cunbao, Rahimi-Aghdam, S., and Bažant, Z.P. (2017). "The enigma of large-scale permeability of gas shale: Pre-existing or frac-induced?" J. of Applied Mechanics ASME 84 (June), žpp. 061008–1--11.
- Luo, Wen, and Bažant, Z.P. (2017). "Fishnet statistics for probabilistic strength and scaling of nacreous imbricated lamellar materials." J. of the Mechanics and Physics of Solids 109, 264–287.
- Sinko, R., Bažant, Z.P., and Keten, S. (2018). "A nanoscale perspective on the effects of transverse microprestress on drying creep of nanoporous solids." Proc. Royal Society A 474: 20170570.
- Rasoolinejad, M., and Bazžant, Z.P. (2018). "Statistical filtering of useful concrete creep data from imperfect laboratory tests." Materials \& Structures 51: 153, pp. 1–14.
- Rahimi-Aghdam, S., Chau, Viet-T., Lee, H., Nguyen, H., Li, W., Karra, S., Rougier, E., Viswanathan, H., Srinivasan, G., and Bažant, Z.P. (2019). "Branching of hydraulic cracks enabling permeability of gas or oil shale with closed natural fractures." Proc. of National Academy of Sciences (PNAS) 116 (5), 1532–1537 (also arXiv:1212.11023; 2018).
- Rahimi-Aghdam, S., and Bažant, Z.P. (2019). "Century-long expansion of hydrating cement counteracting shrinkage due to selfdesiccation and external drying of concrete." Materials and Structures 52:11, pp. 1–21 (RILEM Special Anniversary Issue).
- Rahimi-Aghdam, S., Cusatis, G., and Bažant, Z.P. (2019). "Extended microprestress-solidification (XMPS) theory for long-term creep with diffusion size effect in concrete at variable environment." ASCE J. of Engineering Mechanics 145 (2), 04018131-1---14 (also: arXiv submit/2242476; 2018).
- Nguyen, H.Y., Rahimi-Aghdam, S., Bažant, Z.P. (2019). "Sorption Isotherm Restricted by Multilayer Hindered Adsorption and Its Relation to Nanopore Size Distribution." J. of the Mechanics & Physics of Solids (preliminary posting as arXiv:1812.11235).
- Nguyen, Hoang T., Pathirage, M., Rezaei, M., Issa, M., Cusatis, G., and Bažant, Z.P. (2020). ``New perspective of fracture mechanics inspired by gap test with crack-parallel compression." Proc. National Academy of Sciences 117(25), 14015--140z20.
- Luo, Wen, and Bažant, Z.P. (2020). ``General Fishnet Statistics of Strength: Nacreous, Biomimetic, Concrete, Octet-Truss, and Other Architected or Quasibrittle Materials." ASME J. of Applied Mechanics, Vol. 87 (March), pp. 031015-1---8.
- Nguyen, Anh T., Xu, Houlin, Matouš, K., Bažant, Z.P. (2024). ``Smooth Lagrangian crack band model based on spress-sprain relation and Lagrange multiplier constraint of displacement gradient." ASME J. of Applied Mechanics 91, 031007-1--10

=== Bibliography ===
- Bažant's list of publications:
- J. P. Dempsey and G. Pijaudier-Cabot, Guest Editors (1998), Preface in " Special Topics in Structural Mechanics of Geomaterials", "A Volume in Honor of Professor Z. P. Bažant", Special Issue of Int. J. of Solids & Structures 35 (31–32), 4019–4350.
- G. Pijaudier-Cabot, Z. Bittnár and Bruno Gérard, Editors (1999), Preface in "Mechanics of Quasi-Brittle Materials and Structures," "A Volume in Honour of Professor Z.P. Bažant 's 60th Birthday", Hermes Science Publications, Paris (446 pp.).
- V. Červenka (2002). "Profesor Bažant becomes member of US National Academy of Sciences" (in Czech). Beton (Prague) 2 (5), p. 54.
- Editorial, "Prof. Bažant Visiting CTU (Czech Technical University) in Prague" (in Czech), Prazska Technika 2003 (No. 2), 10–11.
- S. Karlowski (2003), "Dr. Bažant receives the Structural Group Lifetime Achievement Award", ASCE Illinois Section News, Vo. 44 (6), 2003, pp. 1 and 4.
- C. Kisor (2003), "Tough Shoulders". Pilot (Evanston Northwestern Healthcare) 67 (2), 10–11.
- V. Křístek (2005), "Prof. Ing. Z.P. Bažant, Ph.D., Dr.h.c." (in Czech) Aula-Review of Academic and Science Policy (Prague) Vol. 13 (No. 2), 34–35.
- G.J. Dvorak, Guest Editor (2006), Preface and Special Issue in Honor of Professor Z.P. Bažant, Intern. Jour. of Fracture 137 (1–4), pp. 1–294.
- C.K.Y. Leung and K. Willam, Guest Editors (2007), Preface and Special Issue dedicated to Z.P. Bažant, Engineering Fracture Mechanics 74 (1–2), pp. 1–280 (20 papers).
- Ta-Peng Chang and Jenn-Chuan Chern (2007). Preface and Proc., Asian Special Workshop on Concrete Technology in Honor of the 70th Birthday of Prof. Z.P. Bažant," National Taiwan University of Science and Technology, Taipei, Nov. 2
- V. Křístek (2007). Prof. Z. P. Bažant 70 Year Anniversary (in Czech)." Beton (Prague), Vol. 7, No. 6 (Dec.), pp. 54–55.
- Sarah Ostman, "Concrete Results" (Bažant 's life and achievements), McCormick Magazine, Fall 2012, Northwestern University, Evanston.
- Ulm, F.-J. Mechanics and Physics of Creep, Shrinkage, and Durability of Concrete: A Tribute to Zdeněk P. Bažant. CONCREEP-9 (9th Intern. Conf. on Creep, Shrinkage and Durability Mechanics of Concrete, held in 2014 at MIT, Cambridge). Washington: ASCE. doi:10.1061/9780784413111.
- Dvorak, George J. (January–February 2006). "Preface to Special Issue In Honor of Professor Zdeněk P. Bažant" (PDF). International Journal of Fracture. 137 (1–4): 1–7. doi:10.1007/s10704-006-7350-4.

== See also ==
- Microplane model for constitutive laws of materials
