= Eshelby Mechanics Award for Young Faculty =

The Eshelby Mechanics Award for Young Faculty, launched in 2012, is given annually to rapidly emerging junior faculty who exemplify the creative use and development of mechanics. The intent of the award is to promote the field of mechanics, especially among young researchers, and commemorate the memory of Professor John Douglas Eshelby. While interdisciplinary work that bridges mechanics with physics, chemistry, biology and other disciplines is encouraged, the ideal awardee will demonstrate clear inspiration from mechanics in his or her research. Awardees receive a $1,500 cash prize and a commemorative plaque. The awardees are formally recognized at the annual Applied Mechanics Division banquet at the ASME-IMECE meeting.

== Nomination procedure ==
Nominees must be in a tenured or tenure-track faculty position or an independent researcher in a national laboratory and not have reached their 41st birthday by December 31 of the year of the awards presentation. Nominators must fill out the nomination form and provide a letter of recommendation for the nominee along with two letters of recommendation from two other researchers. The nomination packet must also include a detailed curriculum vitae for the nominee. Nominations and recommendation letters from Ph.D. and post-doctoral advisors are discouraged.

== Recipients ==
- 2025 – Christos Athanasiou from Georgia Tech
- 2024 – Anna Tarakanova from University of Connecticut
- 2023 – Tal Cohen from Massachusetts Institute of Technology
- 2022 – Ruike Renee Zhao from Stanford University
- 2021 – Yuhang Hu from Georgia Tech
- 2020 – David L. Henann from Brown University
- 2019 – Shuman Xia from Georgia Tech
- 2018 – Xiaoyan Li from Tsinghua University
- 2017 – Celia Reina from University of Pennsylvania and Yihui Zhang from Tsinghua University
- 2016 – Yong Zhu from North Carolina State University
- 2015 – Samantha Daly from University of California at Santa Barbara
- 2014 – Ken Kamrin from Massachusetts Institute of Technology
- 2013 – Liping Liu from Rutgers University
- 2012 – Vicky Nguyen from the Johns Hopkins University and Kaushik Dayal from Carnegie-Mellon University

== Selection committee ==
The selection committee consists of five prominent mechanicians who are editors or editorial board members of mechanics journals. The composition of the selection committee includes:

- (2012-2014) Kaushik Bhattacharya—California Institute of Technology, Senior Editorial Advisor and Board Member of the Journal of the Mechanics and Physics of Solids
- (2012–2025) Roger Fosdick—University of Minnesota, Editor of the Journal of Elasticity
- (2012–present) Huajian Gao—Brown University, Editorial Board Member of the Journal of the Mechanics and Physics of Solids
- (2012–present) Yonggang Huang—Northwestern University, Chief Editor of the Appied Mechanics Reviews
- (2012–2025) K. Ravichandar—University of Texas at Austin, Chief Editor of the International Journal of Fracture
- (2015–present) G. Ravichandran—California Institute of Technology, Editorial Board member of the Journal of the Mechanics and Physics of Solids
- (2026–present) Pierre Suquet—CNRS France, Editorial Board member of the Journal of the Mechanics and Physics of Solids
- (2026–present) Vikram Deshpande—Cambridge University, Chief Editor of the Journal of the Mechanics and Physics of Solids

The selection committee is completely autonomous and its decision is final. Pradeep Sharma of University of Houston, Associate Editor of the Journal of the Mechanics and Physics of Solids serves as the secretary for the award (2012–present). The secretary does not participate in the award decisions, and his or her role is to advertise the award and collect the nominations.

== See also ==
- List of mechanical engineering awards
