= Research Experiences for Undergraduates =

U.S. summer research programs for science, engineering and mathematics undergraduates

Research Experiences for Undergraduates (or REUs) are competitive summer research programs in the United States for undergraduates studying science, engineering, or mathematics. The programs are sponsored by the National Science Foundation, and are hosted in various universities. REUs tend to be specialized in a particular field of science. There are REUs in many scientific fields such as mathematics, physics, chemistry, geology, biology, psychology, and computer science.

There are two kinds of REU experiences: REU individual experiences (funded by NSF via their REU Supplements category of grant supplements) and REU sites (funded by NSF via their REU Sites category of grant proposals).

== How students apply to participate ==
REU sites typically consist of ten undergraduates working in the research program of the host institution either in the US or abroad, for example, CERN. As the program is funded by the NSF, undergraduates must be citizens or permanent residents of the US or its possessions to be eligible for funding. However, some REU sites accept "self-funder" international students. Applications are typically due between February and the end of April. The length of the application ranges from a single letter of reference without supporting materials all the way up to something comparable to a college admissions application. The programs generally require between one and three letters of reference, a transcript, 0-2 essays, a letter of interest, a resume, a biographical form, or some combination thereof. Although all eligible students are encouraged to apply, there is an emphasis on including populations underrepresented in science—women, underrepresented minorities, and persons with disabilities.

REU individual experiences typically consist of one undergraduate student, or two undergraduate students working together. Sometimes these undergraduates work with a larger research team that includes graduate students. These REU experiences take place at the student's current university, and can last anywhere from a few weeks to an entire year. The application process varies by the particular faculty member who plans to work with these students.

== Compensation ==
Students participating in REU sites are generally provided with a modest stipend ($4,000–$8,000 for 10 weeks of work), housing, transportation to and from the site, and often arrangements for food. REU individual experiences pay (stipends or on an hourly basis) at about the same payrate as REU sites.

== History ==
Research grants which included undergraduate research assistants have been funded from the very beginning of the NSF. But in 1958, the NSF established the Undergraduate Research Participation Program, and funding for that program continued until FY 1982, when it was abolished in the Reagan Administration cuts of NSF education funding. A program to enhance research experiences for undergraduates was reestablished in FY 1987 with the title Research Experiences for Undergraduates.

== See also ==
- List of undergraduate research journals
- Research
- Undergraduate education
- Undergraduate research journal
- Undergraduate Research Opportunities Program
