= Structural material =

Stress–strain curve for low-carbon steel. Hooke's law (see above) is only valid for the portion of the curve between the origin and the yield point (2).: 1. Ultimate strength; 2. Yield strength (yield point); 3. Rupture; 4. Strain hardening region; 5. Necking region; 1. Apparent stress (F/A_{0}); 2. Actual stress (F/A)

Structural engineering depends on the knowledge of materials and their properties, in order to understand how different materials resist and support loads.

Common structural materials are:

== Iron ==
=== Wrought iron ===
Wrought iron is the simplest form of iron, and is almost pure iron (typically less than 0.15% carbon). It usually contains some slag. Its uses are almost entirely obsolete, and it is no longer commercially produced.

Wrought iron is very poor in fires. It is ductile, malleable and tough. It does not corrode as easily as steel.

=== Cast iron ===
Cast iron is a brittle form of iron which is weaker in tension than in compression. It has a relatively low melting point, good fluidity, castability, excellent machinability and wear resistance. Though almost entirely replaced by steel in building structures, cast irons have become an engineering material with a wide range of applications, including pipes, machine and car parts.

Cast iron retains high strength in fires, despite its low melting point. It is usually around 95% iron, with between 2.1% and 4% carbon and between 1% and 3% silicon. It does not corrode as easily as steel.

=== Steel ===
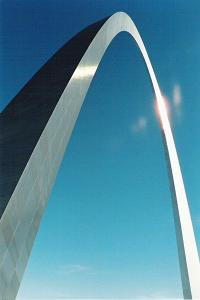
The 630-foot (192 m) high, stainless-clad (type 304) Gateway Arch in Saint Louis, Missouri

Steel is an iron alloy with controlled level of carbon (between 0.0 and 1.7% carbon).

Steel is used extremely widely in all types of structures, due to its relatively low cost, high strength-to-weight ratio and speed of construction.

Steel is a ductile material, which will behave elastically until it reaches yield (point 2 on the stress–strain curve), when it becomes plastic and will fail in a ductile manner (large strains, or extensions, before fracture at point 3 on the curve). Steel is equally strong in tension and compression.

Steel is weak in fires, and must be protected in most buildings. Despite its high strength to weight ratio, steel buildings have as much thermal mass as similar concrete buildings.

The elastic modulus of steel is approximately 205 GPa.

Steel is very prone to corrosion (rust).

=== Stainless steel ===
Stainless steel is an iron-carbon alloy with a minimum of 10.5% chromium content. There are different types of stainless steel, containing different proportions of iron, carbon, molybdenum, nickel. It has similar structural properties to steel, although its strength varies significantly.

It is rarely used for primary structure, and more for architectural finishes and building cladding.

It is highly resistant to corrosion and staining.

== Concrete ==
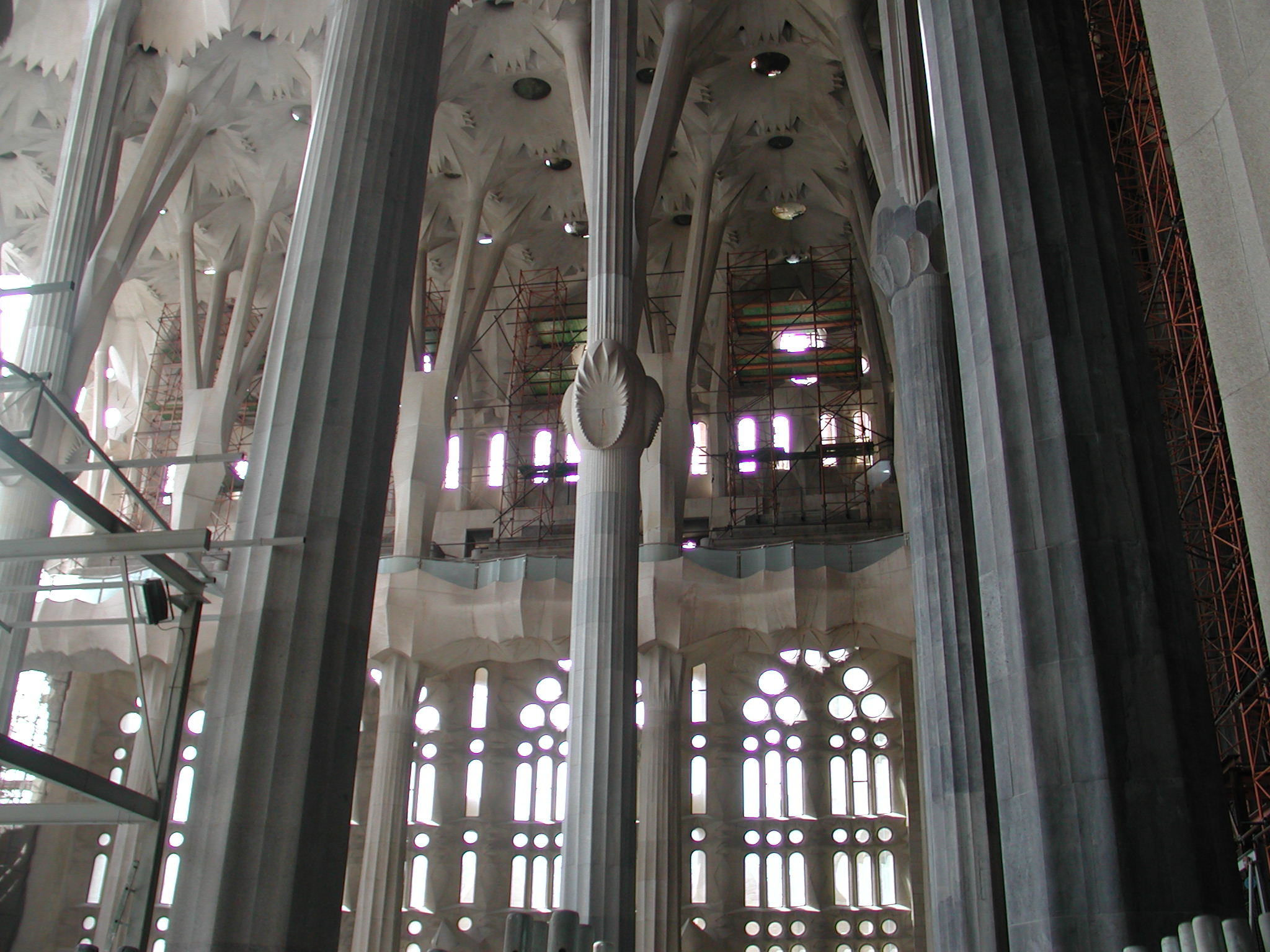
The interior of the Sagrada Familia, constructed of reinforced concrete to a design by Antoni Gaudí

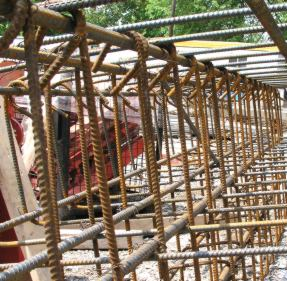
A "cage" of reinforcing steel

Concrete is used extremely widely in building and civil engineering structures, due to its low cost, flexibility, durability, and high strength. It also has high resistance to fire.

Concrete is a non-linear, non-elastic and brittle material. It is strong in compression and very weak in tension. It behaves non-linearly at all times. Because it has essentially zero strength in tension, it is almost always used as reinforced concrete, a composite material. It is a mixture of sand, aggregate, cement and water. It is placed in a mould, or form, as a liquid, and then it sets (goes off), due to a chemical reaction between the water and cement. The hardening of the concrete is called hydration. The reaction is exothermic (gives off heat).

Concrete increases in strength continually from the day it is cast. Assuming it is not cast under water or in constantly 100% relative humidity, it shrinks over time as it dries out, and it deforms over time due to a phenomenon called creep. Its strength depends highly on how it is mixed, poured, cast, compacted, cured (kept wet while setting), and whether or not any admixtures were used in the mix. It can be cast into any shape that a form can be made for. Its colour, quality, and finish depend upon the complexity of the structure, the material used for the form, and the skill of the worker.

The elastic modulus of concrete can vary widely and depends on the concrete mix, age, and quality, as well as on the type and duration of loading applied to it. It is usually taken as approximately 25 GPa for long-term loads once it has attained its full strength (usually considered to be at 28 days after casting). It is taken as approximately 38 GPa for very short-term loading, such as footfalls.

Concrete has very favourable properties in fire – it is not adversely affected by fire until it reaches very high temperatures. It also has very high mass, so it is good for providing sound insulation and heat retention (leading to lower energy requirements for the heating of concrete buildings). This is offset by the fact that producing and transporting concrete is very energy intensive. To study the material behavior plenty of numerical models were developed, e.g. the microplane model for constitutive laws of materials.

=== Reinforced concrete ===
Reinforced concrete is concrete in which steel reinforcement bars ("rebars"), plates or fibers have been incorporated to strengthen a material that would otherwise be brittle. In industrialised countries, nearly all concrete used in construction is reinforced concrete. Due to its weakness in tension capacity, concrete will fail suddenly and in brittle manner under flexural (bending) or tensile force unless adequately reinforced with steel.

=== Prestressed concrete ===
Prestressed concrete is a method for overcoming the concrete's natural weakness in tension. It can be used to produce beams, floors or bridges with a longer span than is practical with ordinary reinforced concrete. Prestressing tendons (generally of high tensile steel cable or rods) are used to provide a clamping load which produces a compressive stress that offsets the tensile stress that the concrete compression member would otherwise experience due to a bending load.

== Aluminium ==
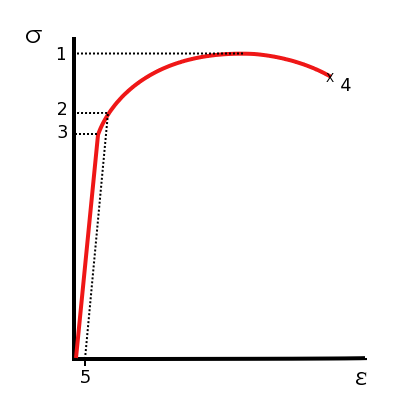
Stress vs. strain curve typical of aluminium: 1. Ultimate strength; 2. Yield strength; 3. Proportional Limit Stress; 4. Rupture; 5. Offset strain (typically 0.002).

Aluminium is a soft, lightweight, malleable metal. The yield strength of pure aluminium is 7–11 MPa, while aluminium alloys have yield strengths ranging from 200 MPa to 600 MPa. Aluminium has about one-third the density and stiffness of steel. It is ductile, and easily machined, cast, and extruded.

Corrosion resistance is excellent due to a thin surface layer of aluminium oxide that forms when the metal is exposed to air, effectively preventing further oxidation. The strongest aluminium alloys are less corrosion resistant due to galvanic reactions with alloyed copper.

Aluminium is used in some building structures (mainly in facades) and very widely in aircraft engineering because of its good strength to weight ratio. It is a relatively expensive material.

In aircraft it is gradually being replaced by carbon composite materials.

== Composites ==
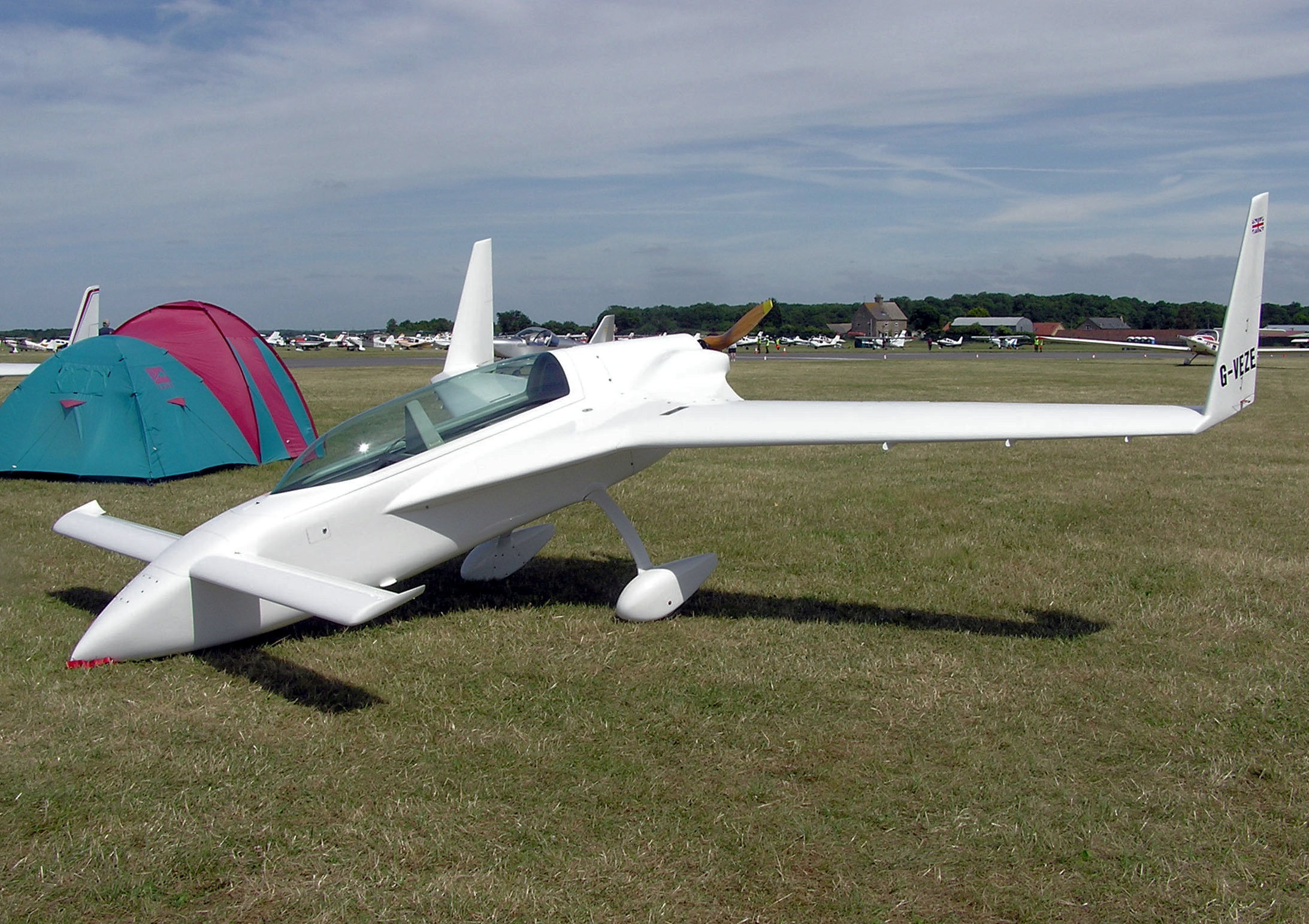
Light composite aircraft

Composite materials are used increasingly in vehicles and aircraft structures, and to some extent in other structures. They are increasingly used in bridges, especially for conservation of old structures such as Coalport cast iron bridge built in 1818. Composites are often anisotropic (they have different material properties in different directions) as they can be laminar materials. They most often behave non-linearly and will fail in a brittle manner when overloaded.

They provide extremely good strength to weight ratios, but are also very expensive. The manufacturing processes, which are often extrusion, do not currently provide the economical flexibility that concrete or steel provide. The most commonly used in structural applications are glass-reinforced plastics.

== Masonry ==
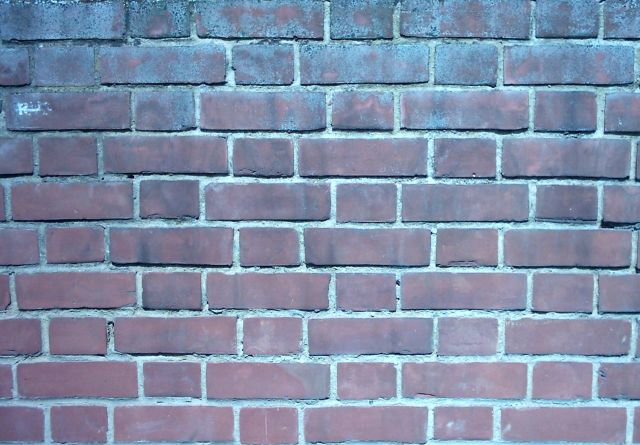
A brick wall built using Flemish bond

Masonry has been used in structures for thousands of years, and can take the form of stone, brick or blockwork. Masonry is very strong in compression but cannot carry tension (because the mortar between bricks or blocks is unable to carry tension). Because it cannot carry structural tension, it also cannot carry bending, so masonry walls become unstable at relatively small heights. High masonry structures require stabilisation against lateral loads from buttresses (as with the flying buttresses seen in many European medieval churches) or from windposts.

Historically masonry was constructed with no mortar or with lime mortar. In modern times cement based mortars are used. The mortar glues the blocks together, and also smooths out the interface between the blocks, avoiding localised point loads that might have led to cracking.

Since the widespread use of concrete, stone is rarely used as a primary structural material, often only appearing as a cladding, because of its cost and the high skills needed to produce it. Brick and concrete blockwork have taken its place.

Masonry, like concrete, has good sound insulation properties and high thermal mass, but is generally less energy intensive to produce. It is just as energy intensive as concrete to transport.

== Timber ==
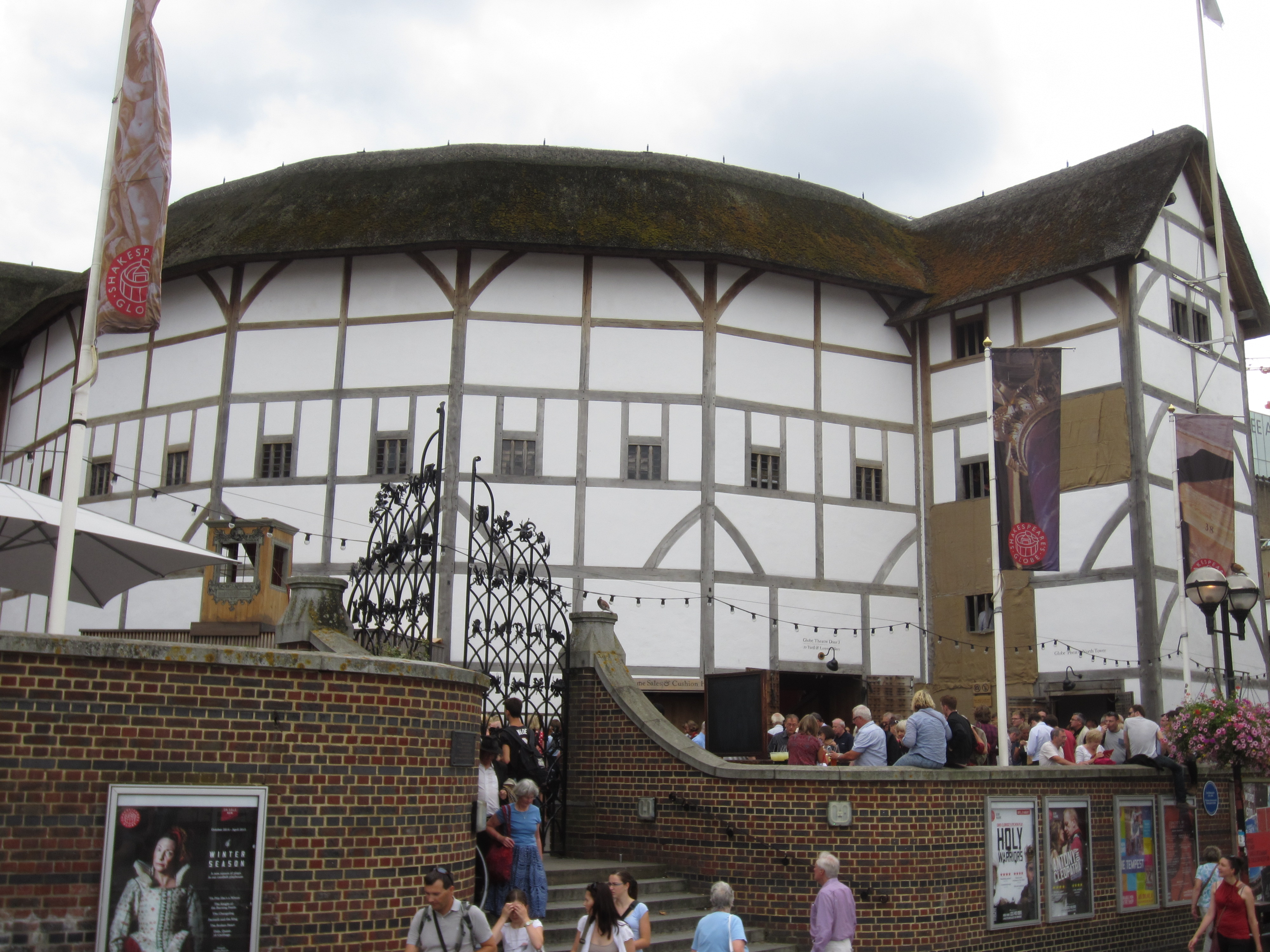
The reconstructed Globe Theatre, London, by Buro Happold

Timber is the oldest of structural materials, and though mainly supplanted by steel, masonry and concrete, it is still used in a significant number of buildings. The properties of timber are non-linear and very variable, depending on the quality, treatment of wood, and type of wood supplied. The design of wooden structures is based strongly on empirical evidence.

Wood is strong in tension and compression but can be weak in bending due to its fibrous structure. Wood is relatively good in a fire as it chars, which provides the wood in the centre of the element with some protection and allows the structure to retain some strength for a reasonable length of time.

== Other structural materials ==
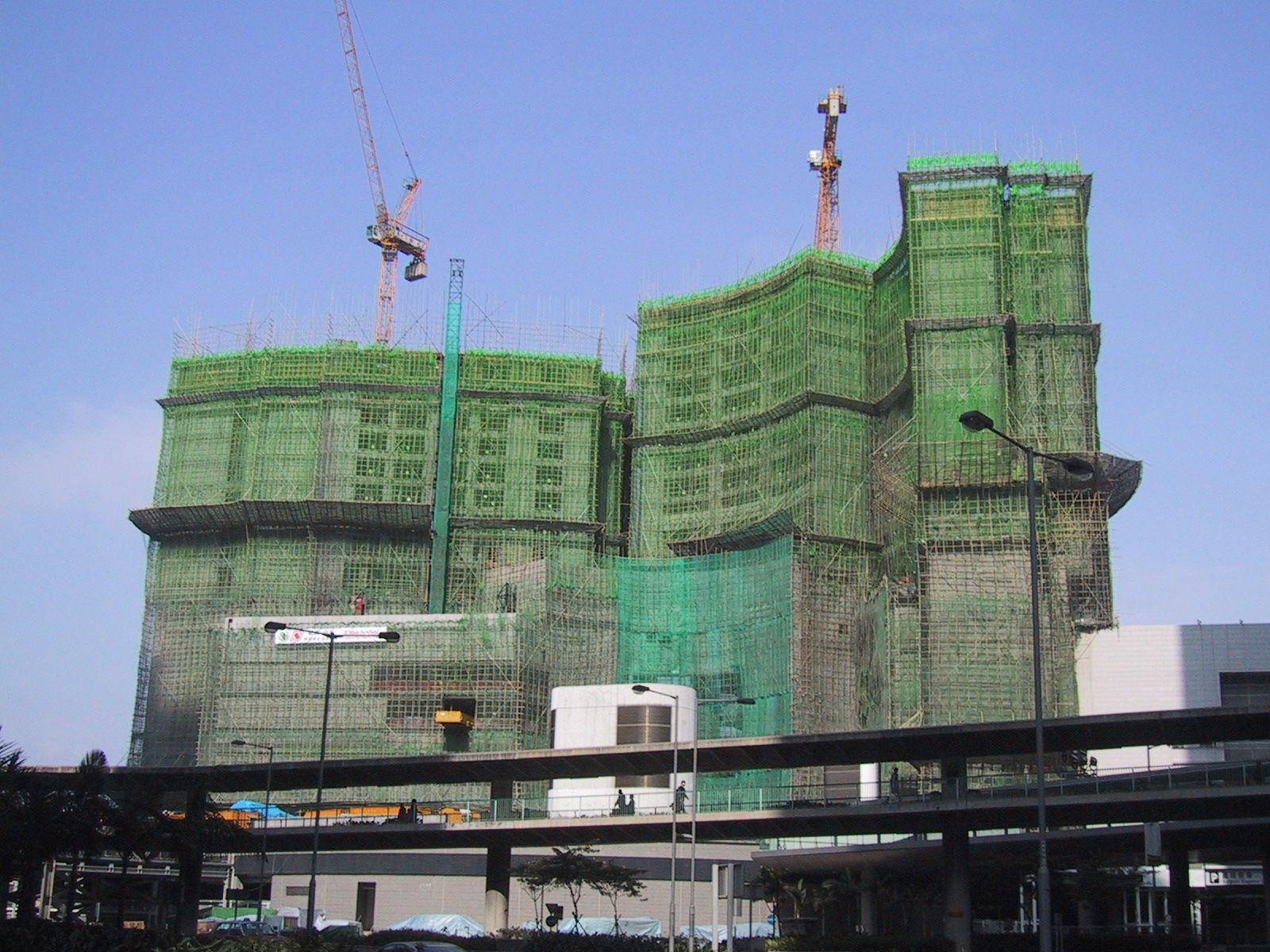
Bamboo scaffolding can reach great heights.

- Adobe
- Alloy
- Bamboo
- Carbon fibre
- Fiber reinforced plastic
- Mudbrick
- Roofing materials
