= Undergraduate research journal =

Academic journal that publishes undergraduate student research

An undergraduate research journal is an academic journal dedicated to publishing the work of undergraduate research students. Such journals have been described as important for the professionalization of students into their academic discipline and a more substantive opportunity to experience the publication and peer review process than inclusion in the acknowledgments or as one of many authors on a traditional publication. The model has been described as well established in the United States and as a potential extension to the traditional undergraduate dissertation written by students in the United Kingdom. A case study of student participation in the journal Reinvention: A Journal of Undergraduate Research, found that the process challenges the "student as consumer" model of higher education.

== Examples ==
Many universities maintain such journals for their own undergraduates, such as the Beloit Biologist, a Beloit College publication that launched in the early 1970s. Some scholarly societies also maintain venues for the dissemination of undergraduate research, for example as special sessions at academic conferences. Non-institutional journals may be sponsored by professional societies — for example, the American Institute of Physics published the undergraduate-peer-reviewed Journal of Undergraduate Research in Physics starting in 1981, with a temporary hiatus beginning in 2014. The Journal of Young Investigators, which has received support through science-education grants from the United States National Science Foundation, the Burroughs Wellcome Fund, and Duke University, is managed primarily by undergraduates and is regarded as innovative because students are involved in reviewing and editing papers for publication. A similar model exists for the Midwest Journal of Undergraduate Research, published at Monmouth College since 2010.

Variations on the model may accept work from even younger students; for example, the Journal of Emerging Investigators, managed by graduate students at Harvard University, publishes work by middle school and high school students under the guidance of a teacher or mentor. In 2014, a JEI paper gained widespread international media attention for its recommendation that the United States government save money on ink by changing official fonts.

=== Journals by topic ===
This is a list of notable peer-reviewed academic journals of undergraduate research. Undergraduate research journals listed should be published by accredited colleges and universities, professional associations, or notable independent academic publishers. Periodicals published by non-academic government entities should not be included.Journals previously published under a different name or by a different publisher should be footnoted.

Journals listed must be open to reviewing and potentially publishing the work of undergraduates from at least ten colleges or universities as this list is not a platform for providing information about institution-specific journals (journals that only publish the work of their institution's undergraduates).

The following is a partial list of undergraduate research journals, their dates of publication (when available), and their publisher or publishing institution, and ISSN(s) (when available).

==== Multidisciplinary ====
- American Journal of Undergraduate Research (2002–present); published by American Journal for Undergraduate Research (ISSN 1536-4585)
- Butler Journal of Undergraduate Research; published by Butler University
- Midwest Journal of Undergraduate Research (2010–present); published by Monmouth College

==== Science ====
- Columbia Undergraduate Science Journal (2006–present); published by Columbia University
- Dartmouth Undergraduate Journal of Science (1998–present); published by Dartmouth College
- Journal of Young Investigators (1997–present); published by Journal of Young Investigators (ISSN 1539-4026)
- Edinburgh Student Journal of Science (2024–present); published by Edinburgh Diamond, University of Edinburgh (ISSN 3049-7930)

==== Arts and Literary ====
- Mosaic (1959–present); published by the University of California

==== English ====
- The Oswald Review (1999–present); published by University of South Carolina University Libraries

==== History ====
- Columbia Journal of History (2008–present); published by the Undergraduate History Council of Columbia University
- The Princeton Historical Review (2016–present); published by Princeton University
- The Vanderbilt Historical Review (2016–present); published by Vanderbilt University
- The Smith College Historical Review (2025–present); published by Smith College

==== International Studies ====
- Hemispheres, Tufts University Journal of International Affairs (1977–present); published by Tufts University
- Journal of Undergraduate International Studies (2007–present); published by the University of Wisconsin–Madison
- Al Noor: The Undergraduate Middle Eastern Studies Journal of Boston College (2008–present); published by Boston College
- Southern California International Review (2011–present); published by the School of International Relations at the University of Southern California

==== Mathematics ====
- Rose-Hulman Undergraduate Mathematics Journal (2000–present); published by Rose Hulman Institute of Technology Libraries Publishing
- Minnesota Journal of Undergraduate Mathematics (2015–present); published by University of Minnesota Libraries Publishing (ISSN 2378-5810)

==== Music ====
- Nota Bene; published by Western University Canada (ISSN 1920-8987)

==== Philosophy ====
- Episteme; published by Denison University

==== Physics ====
- Journal of Undergraduate Research in Physics; published by the Society of Physics Students, American Institute of Physics

==== Political Science and Government ====
- Pi Sigma Alpha Undergraduate Journal of Politics (2001–present); published by Elon University (ISSN 1556-2034); funded by Pi Sigma Alpha honorary society

==== Social Science ====
- Intersect: The Stanford Journal of Science, Technology, and Society (2013–present); published by Stanford University
- Student Spotlight published independently by Student Spotlight
- Prisms: The Princeton Undergraduate Journal of Gender and Sexuality Studies (2024–present); published by Princeton University

== Criticism ==
The model of separate journals specifically for undergraduates has been criticized for several reasons. Such journals may not be indexed in common literature databases and publishing research in an undergraduate-only venue may make it difficult for others to find the work. Concerns have also been expressed that the process could increase stress and competitiveness in undergraduate research.

== See also ==
- Research Experiences for Undergraduates
- Council on Undergraduate Research
