= Council on Undergraduate Research =

Membership organization in the United States

- Abbreviation: CUR
- Formation: 1987
- Merger of: National Conference on Undergraduate Research
- Type: Professional association
- Headquarters: Washington, DC
- Location: United States

The Council on Undergraduate Research (CUR) is a national organization in the United States. As of 2015, it represented more than 900 colleges and universities.

It is a not-for-profit 501(c)(3), non-partisan professional association founded in 1987 that supports and promotes high-quality mentored undergraduate research, scholarship, and creative inquiry. CUR defines undergraduate research as "a mentored investigation or creative inquiry conducted by undergraduates that seeks to make a scholarly or artistic contribution to knowledge". The activities and services of CUR are wide-ranging and include educational programming, consulting services, conferences, advocacy, and publications. CUR is staffed by an executive director, Lindsay Currie, and a team of association professionals based in Maryland.

== History ==
In 1978, the Midwest Regional Director for the Research Corporation, Brian Andreen, facilitated the establishment of a group of ten research-active chemists from primarily undergraduate institutions to develop a directory documenting the performance and productivity of research in undergraduate departments to solicit support for faculty engaged in undergraduate research at these institutions. The directory was ultimately titled Research in Chemistry at Private Undergraduate Colleges. The team met in Pittsburgh in 1979 to discuss the future of the group, which called itself “Council on Undergraduate Research.” The group formalized their status as an organization and trademarked the name of the group. In 1983, CUR opened its membership to include public undergraduate institutions and to include faculty representation from physics/astronomy and biology. Today there are 11 disciplinary divisions, an at-large division that serves administrators and other disciplines and a division of undergraduate research programs representing the interests of staff responsible for institutional undergraduate research programs and offices.

In 2010, CUR and the National Conference on Undergraduate Research (NCUR) merged their two organizations to form one, with CUR as the umbrella organization presenting a National Conference on Undergraduate Research (NCUR) at which students of all academic majors present the fruits of their URSCI (Undergraduate Research, Scholarship, and Creative Inquiry) experiences annually.

== Governance and leadership ==
CUR's bylaws are publicly available. Operational leadership is provided by CUR's executive officer and staff. CUR's board of directors is the governing body and has responsibility for the mission, strategy, and bylaws of the organization. The four members of the Presidential succession (Treasurer, President-Elect, President, and Immediate Past-President), Executive Officer (ex-officio), and nine elected Directors, constitute the board of directors.

A multidisciplinary Council composed of the Council Chair, Treasurer (ex-officio), Executive Officer (ex-officio), and representative members each division provides advisory input to the board of directors. Each division is represented by two elected Councilors.

CUR has three standing committees (executive, finance, and nomination and leadership development), CUR annually charges additional committees, advisory groups, and task forces to support its program and content development, strategic initiatives, and awards.

Each division, has elected representatives led by an elected chair, Vice-chair, and Secretary, aims to create networking opportunities, activities, and resources for their members. Many divisions communicate with their members online using the CUR Community discussion boards, blogs, Facebook or LinkedIn groups, and newsletters.

== Programming and services ==
CUR offers a variety of multimodal educational programming each year. The variety of programming offered supports the URSCI enterprise from all sides, including presentation opportunities for students, advocacy education, faculty professional development, grant sourcing and writing, and much more. CUR also runs a consulting service and a program review service.

CUR offers many resources for faculty mentors and undergraduate research students. Resources for mentors include a Job Board on the CUR Community posting employment opportunities for faculty, staff, and administrators, tools for international collaborations, community colleges, assessment of undergraduate research activities and programs, and undergraduate research advocacy. The Student Resource Center includes resume building and networking tips, presentation format details, an extensive listing of undergraduate research opportunities, undergraduate research journals, and conferences.

== Presidents ==
- Michael P. Doyle 1979–1983, 1987–1989
- Jerry Mohrig 1983–1987
- Stuart Crampton 1989–1991
- Laura Hoopes 1991–1992
- Thomas Goodwin 1992–1993
- John Mateja 1993–1994
- Mary Allen 1994–1995
- Royce Engstrom 1995–1996
- Thomas Wenzel 1996–1997
- Neal Abraham 1997–1998
- Charlotte Otto 1998–1999
- David Elmes 1999–2000
- Toufic Hakim 2000–2001
- Michael Nelson 2001–2002
- Mitchell Malachowski 2002–2003
- Jill Singer 2003–2004
- Tim Elgren 2004–2005
- Mike Tannenbaum 2005–2006
- Lori Bettison-Varga 2006–2007
- Kerry Karukstis 2007–2008
- Jeffrey Osborn 2008–2009
- Diane Husic 2009–2010
- Elizabeth Paul 2010–2011
- Bill Campbell 2011–2012
- Mary Crowe 2012–2013
- Julio Rivera 2013–2014
- Ami Ahern-Rindell 2014–2015
- Roger Rowlett 2015–2016
- Susan Larson 2016–2017
- Anne Boettcher 2017–2018
- Iain Crawford 2018–2019
- Janice DeCosmo 2019–2020
- Silvia Ronco 2020–2021
- Jeanne Mekolichick 2021–2022
- Ruth Palmer 2022–2023
- Bethany Usher 2023–2024

== Recognition ==
CUR recognizes institutions and individuals that have provided high-quality research experiences to undergraduates. In addition to awards supported by each Division, CUR has four awards supported by gifts. These awards are the Campus-wide award for UR Accomplishments (AURA), the CUR Fellows Award, the CUR-Goldwater Scholars Faculty Mentor Award, and the Silvia Ronco Innovative Faculty Mentor Award.

== Publications ==
CUR publishes position papers, white papers, monographs, and handbooks on new and emergent forms and aspects of mentored undergraduate research. The Scholarship & Practice of Undergraduate Research (SPUR), established in 2017, is CUR's scholarly peer-reviewed journal. The aim of the journal is to promote understanding of new and effective approaches to URSCI through the publication of high-quality, rigorously peer-reviewed studies written by scholars and practitioners of undergraduate research, scholarship, and creative inquiry.
