= Al Noor =

Undergraduate research journal

Al Noor: The Undergraduate Middle Eastern Studies Journal of Boston College
- Discipline: Middle Eastern Studies
- Language: English

Publication details
- History: 2008–present
- Publisher: The Institute for Liberal Arts at Boston College (United States)
- Frequency: Biannual

Standard abbreviations
- ISO 4: Al Noor

Indexing
- ISSN: 1946-8342
- LCCN: 2009200125
- OCLC no.: 302365432

Links
- Journal homepage

Al Noor: The Undergraduate Middle Eastern Studies Journal of Boston College is the undergraduate journal of Middle Eastern Studies at Boston College (Chestnut Hill, Massachusetts). The journal publishes biannually, once in the Spring and once in the Fall, and features undergraduate students' original research, interviews, and photo essays. Al Noor is available in both online and print editions.

The journal claims a global audience. In addition to domestic readership, Al-Noor has distributed to more than a dozen foreign countries, including many in the Middle East.

== Name ==
The name Al Noor means "the light" in Arabic, and was chosen to convey the journal's ambition of "illuminat[ing] different sides of issues" and "shin[ing] a non-partisan and unbiased light" on topics in Middle Eastern studies.

The journal alternately goes by Al Noor or Al-Noor. Some sources use both the hyphenated and non-hyphenated names interchangeably within the same text.

== History ==
Al Noor began publishing in 2008. Journal co-founder Christopher Maroshegyi hoped the publication would encourage more dynamic conversations about the Middle East, telling campus newspaper The Heights, "I thought it was essential to present the region as it is, in a new light, different from the Iraqi violence or al-Qaida terrorism which sadly paints a picture of the Middle East for most Americans."

Past issues are archived in hard copy at the Library of Congress and made available on the journal's website. Al Noor first hosted a table at the Middle Eastern Studies Association (MESA) conference in 2009, when the conference was held in Boston, Massachusetts. As of 2021, Al Noor was the only undergraduate research journal with yearly representation at MESA. Al Noor has also attended multiple international research symposiums, including one in Doha, Qatar.

Brooke Loughrin, the United States' first-ever Youth Observer at the United Nations, served as Al Noor's editor-in-chief between 2012 and 2014.

Al Noor has historically interviewed leading figures in government, journalism, and academia for inclusion in each publication. Past interviewees include Saudi royal and former Ambassador to the United States Prince Turki bin Faisal Al Saud, former ABC News Middle East correspondent Charles Glass, Syria expert Joshua Landis, and activist Sakena Yacoobi.
