= Overlook Castle =

Historic house in North Carolina, United States

- Overlook
- U.S. National Register of Historic Places
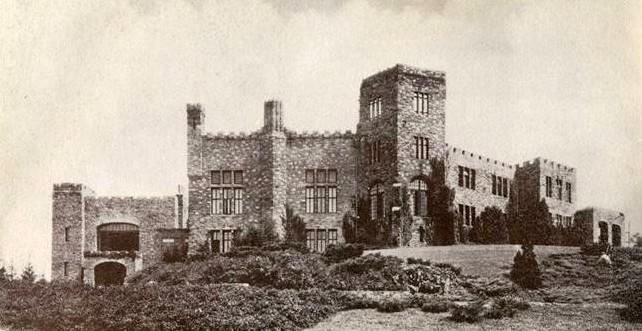
- Overlook Castle in 1920

- Location within North Carolina Location within the United States
- Location: Asheville, North Carolina
- Coordinates: 35°36′40″N 82°32′4″W
- Area: 6 acres (2.4 ha)
- Built: 1914
- Built by: Fred Loring Seely
- Architectural style: English manor
- NRHP reference No.: 80002804
- Added to NRHP: October 22, 1980

Overlook Castle or Seely Castle is a historic house in Asheville, North Carolina. It was built from 1912 to 1914 for Fred Loring Seely, the son-in-law of Edwin Wiley Grove. He built the castle after his father-in-law gave him ten acres on top of Sunset Mountain. The property was added to the National Register of Historic Places on October 22, 1980.

== History ==
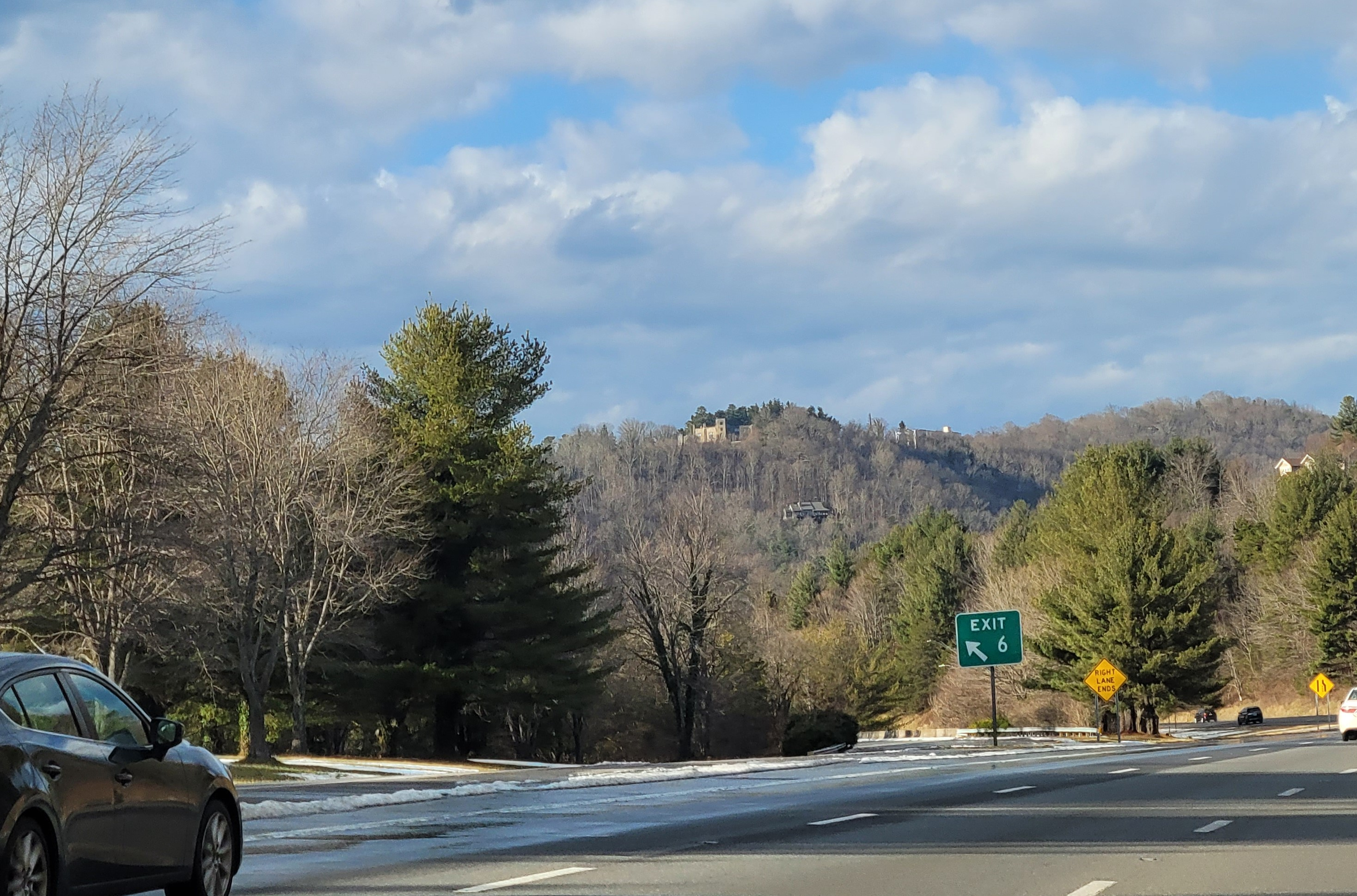
Overlook Castle from I-240, February 2022

The house has had five known owners. The Seelys lived there until 1942, when Mr. Seely died at age 70. In the winter of 1949, Evelyn Grove Seely, daughter of entrepreneur Edwin Wiley Grove and widow of Fred Seely, offered to sell her former home to the second owner, Asheville-Biltmore College. The college was there from 1949 to 1961, until they outgrew the available facilities. The limited area for developing new buildings caused the trustees to move the college to its current site on the northern edge of Asheville. The third owner was Mr. Jerry Sternberg. He upgraded the heating system from coal to oil fuel and put a new roof on the structure. He planned to turn the house into a museum but his plan never came to fruition. He then sought to turn the facility over to a non-profit organization. Overlook Ministries was the fourth owner. The fifth and current owner is the Wells family. They acquired it in 1984 and restored it.

== Architecture ==
The castle has two large glass windows that offer a panoramic view of Asheville. There are Jacobean ceilings. The castle is situated on the top of the mountain and is surrounded by English gardens.
