= Samantha Daly =

American mechanical engineer

Samantha (Sam) Hayes Daly is an American mechanical engineer whose research topics include the failure analysis of novel materials including shape-memory alloys and ceramic matrix composites, and the calibration of the scanning electron microscopes used in this analysis. She is a professor of mechanical engineering at the University of California, Santa Barbara.

== Education and career ==
Daly was an undergraduate at Dartmouth College, where she earned a double bachelor's degree in mechanical engineering and mathematics in 2001. She went to the California Institute of Technology for graduate study in mechanical engineering, earning a master's degree in 2002 and completing her Ph.D. in 2007, under the joint supervision of Kaushik Bhattacharya and Guruswami Ravichandran.

She became an assistant professor of mechanical engineering at the University of Michigan in 2008, and in 2011 added a courtesy appointment in Michigan's Department of Materials Science and Engineering. She was promoted to associate professor there in 2014. In 2016, she moved to the University of California, Santa Barbara as an associate professor, and in 2020 she was promoted to full professor.

== Recognition ==
Daly has received over 30 awards to highlight her work she has done. Daly was the only speaker awarded the National Academy of Engineering (NAE) speaker for the Mechanical division in 2023. Daly was the 2011 recipient of the Orr Early Career Award of the American Society of Mechanical Engineers (ASME), the 2015 recipient of the Eshelby Mechanics Award for Young Faculty, the 2016 recipient of the James W. Dally Award of the Society for Experimental Mechanics, and the 2022 recipient of the Materials Division Centennial Mid-Career Award of the ASME.

She was named as an ASME Fellow in 2021.
