= Council of Public Liberal Arts Colleges =

The Council of Public Liberal Arts Colleges (COPLAC) is a consortium of 27 public liberal arts colleges and universities in 24 states and 1 Canadian province. Established in 1987, COPLAC advances the aims of its member institutions and drives awareness of the value of public liberal arts education in a student-centered, residential environment.

COPLAC campuses are small-to-medium sized (800-7000 students) and the focus is primarily on undergraduate education. As public institutions, COPLAC colleges and universities combine an egalitarian concern for access with academic rigor. Member institutions work to provide a transformative liberal arts education commensurate with that offered by North America's finest private colleges. Essential features this goal are extensive, integrated arts and sciences core curricula.

The majority of campuses are located in small towns and cities, while others are located in rural areas. Some COPLAC campuses have received official designation from their state legislatures or public university systems as the state's public liberal arts college or the public honors college for the liberal arts.

== Mission ==
COPLAC serves both external and internal constituencies. It communicates to state and federal policy makers the importance and benefits of providing students with comprehensive public higher education in the liberal arts and sciences. It collaborates with major national higher education organizations like the Association of American Colleges and Universities to advance the aims of liberal learning in a global society. Through its public liberal arts newsletter, the PLAN, campus leaders offer insight into major issues facing public higher education in the new global century.

COPLAC organizes and administers a number of member collaborations, including faculty and student exchanges, professional development opportunities for staff, faculty summer institutes, shared study-abroad programs, and enhanced information sharing. COPLAC also hosts regional undergraduate research conferences, where students present the results of senior-year scholarly and creative projects. A web-based undergraduate research journal, Metamorphosis, showcases exceptional student work at all 30 member institutions.

== Governance ==
The Governing Board of COPLAC consists of the 27 presidents/chancellors or their designees. The board elects a president of the organization for a two-year term and the full board meets on a semi-annual basis. The board also elects a five-person executive committee whose members oversee the administrative work of the Executive Director of COPLAC. The COPLAC central office and staff are located on the campus of the University of North Carolina, Asheville.
