= Laura Mays Hoopes =

American biologist (1942–2021)

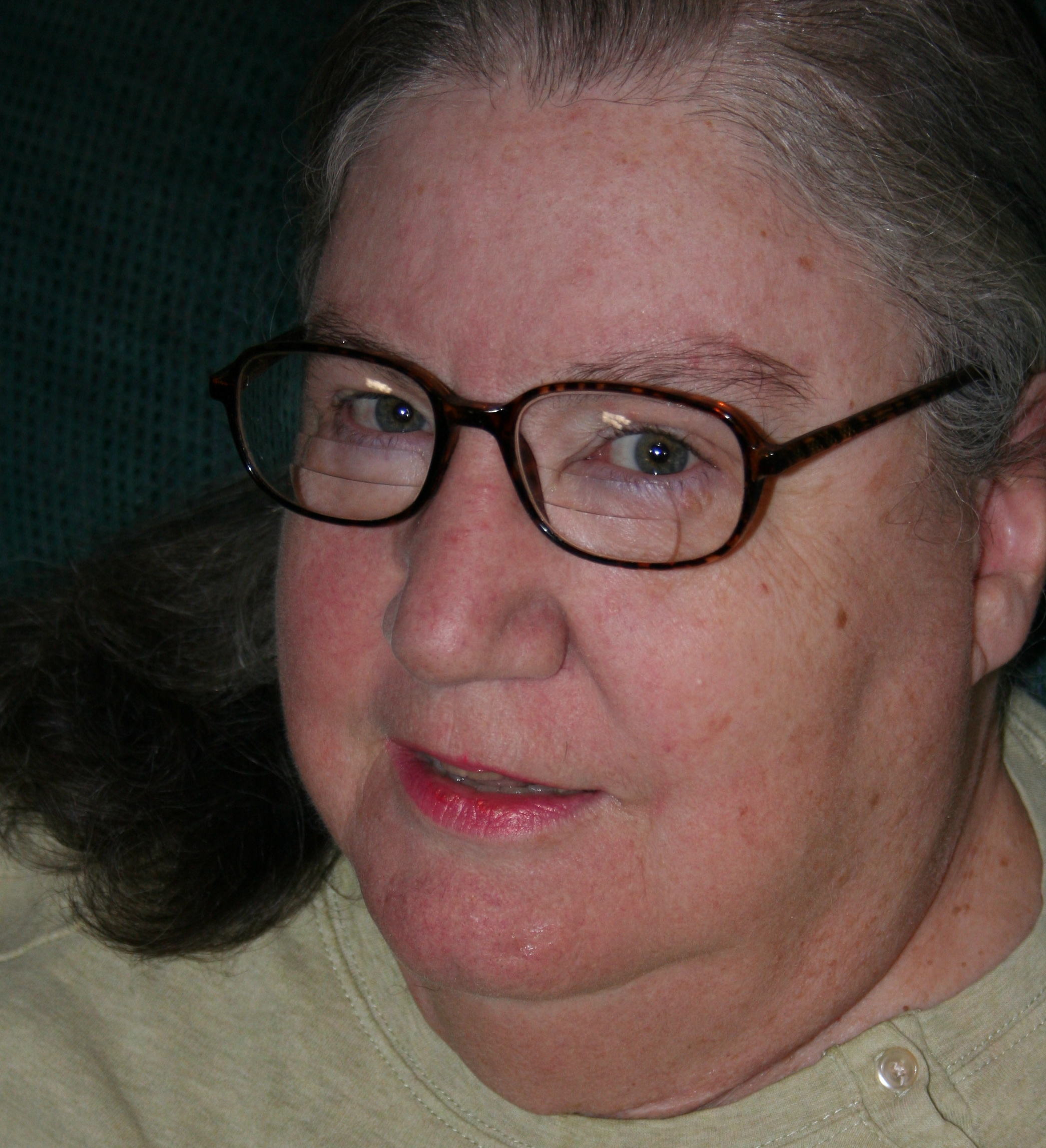
- Hoopes in December 2008
- Born: December 1, 1942
- Died: October 24, 2021 (aged 78–79)
- Education: Goucher College (BS); Yale University (PhD)
- Scientific career
- Fields: Biology
- Institutions: Pomona College

Laura Mays Hoopes (December 1, 1942 – October 24, 2021) was an American biologist. She was the Halstead-Bent Emerita Professor of Biology at Pomona College in Claremont, California. She was dean of the college from 1993 to 1998, and was known for her advocacy of women in science. She was a fellow of the American Association for the Advancement of Science.

== Works ==
- Breaking Through the Spiral Ceiling: An American Woman Becomes a DNA Scientist. Lulu Publishing. October 29, 2013. ISBN 978-1-304-70978-3.
- Opening Doors: Joan Steitz and Jennifer Doudna of the RNA World. Lulu Publishing. March 8, 2019. ISBN 978-0-359-48520-8.
