= National Conference on Undergraduate Research =

- Abbreviation: NCUR
- Merged into: Council on Undergraduate Research (CUR) and NCUR in 2010
- Formation: 1987
- Type: professional academic organization
- Location: Washington, DC

The National Conference on Undergraduate Research (NCUR) was established in 1987 at the University of North Carolina at Asheville to promote undergraduate research in universities throughout the United States. Undergraduate students are invited to submit abstracts to present their work at NCUR, which is currently one of the events sponsored by the Council on Undergraduate Research (CUR) umbrella organization.

== Mission ==
The mission of the National Conference on Undergraduate Research (NCUR) is to promote undergraduate research scholarship and creative activity done in partnership with faculty or other mentors as a vital component of higher education.

== History of NCUR and association with CUR ==
The National Conference on Undergraduate Research (NCUR) was established at University of North Carolina at Asheville in 1987 with 400 students from campuses countrywide presenting their work. From its inception, NCUR included students from the sciences, the arts, the humanities, and the social sciences. Students were encouraged to present their work in collaboration with faculty members in a variety of media and formats from posters to performances. NCUR continued and expanded, beginning to move to different campus hosts in 1989. Currently approximately 4000 students participate annually, drawn from all fields and from any college or university. The Council on Undergraduate Research (CUR) was established in 1987 also with a focus on faculty chemistry research at primarily undergraduate institutions that included the students as co-investigators with their faculty mentors. Over time, CUR welcomed other sciences and then non-sciences and also added an At Large group. The two organizations co-existed until 2010 when they decided to combine forces. Currently, the combined organization is called CUR and it sponsors a NCUR each year.

== Host campuses ==
- 1987 University of North Carolina at Asheville
- 1988 University of North Carolina at Asheville
- 1989 Trinity University
- 1990 Union College
- 1991 California Institute of Technology
- 1992 University of Minnesota
- 1993 University of Utah
- 1994 Western Michigan University
- 1995 Union College
- 1996 University of North Carolina at Asheville
- 1997 University of Texas at Austin
- 1998 Salisbury State University
- 1999 University of Rochester
- 2000 University of Montana-Missoula
- 2001 University of Kentucky
- 2002 University of Wisconsin–Whitewater
- 2003 University of Utah
- 2004 Indiana University-Purdue University Indianapolis
- 2005 Washington and Lee University and Virginia Military Institute
- 2006 University of North Carolina at Asheville
- 2007 Dominican University of California
- 2008 Salisbury University
- 2009 University of Wisconsin–La Crosse
- 2010 University of Montana
- 2011 Ithaca College
- 2012 Weber State University
- 2013 University of Wisconsin–La Crosse
- 2014 University of Kentucky
- 2015 Eastern Washington University
- 2016 University of North Carolina at Asheville
- 2017 University of Memphis
- 2018 University of Central Oklahoma
- 2019 Kennesaw State University
- 2020 Montana State University (cancelled due to the COVID-19 pandemic)
