= Lori Bettison-Varga =

American geologist

Lori Bettison-Varga (born March 1962) is an American geologist, academic administrator, and museum director. Since 2015, she has served as President and Director of the Natural History Museums of Los Angeles County, which includes the Natural History Museum in Exposition Park and La Brea Tar Pits in Hancock Park. Previously, she was president of Scripps College, and held positions at Pomona College, the College of Wooster, and Whitman College.

In November 2024, Bettison-Varga oversaw the opening of NHM Commons—a $75 million expansion funded by the Opening New Doors Campaign. The new addition includes new gathering spaces, a state-of-the-art theater, exhibitions, and programming that deepen public access to science, nature, and culture. The project has garnered critical acclaim and reflects her approach to civic engagement and capital transformation.

She is also spearheading the reimagination of the iconic La Brea Tar Pits Museum, an initiative that connects Ice Age fossil discoveries to urgent issues like biodiversity loss and ecological change. Designed by Weiss/Manfredi, the project aims to redefine how museums can bridge the past and future. The firm's selection was partially made through an unusual community voting process.

In 2022, Bettison-Varga was named a Fellow of the American Association for the Advancement of Science for her distinguished contributions to undergraduate education and science communication. She serves on the boards of the American Alliance of Museums and the Association of Science and Technology Centers.

Raised in Long Beach, California, Bettison-Varga earned her doctorate in geology from UC Davis.
