= University of North Carolina at Asheville =

Public liberal arts university

Coordinates: 35.61619°N 82.56614°W

- Seal of University of North Carolina at Asheville
- Former names: Buncombe County Junior College (1927–1930); College of the City of Asheville (1928–1930); Biltmore Junior College (1930–1934); Biltmore College (1934–1936); Asheville-Biltmore College (1936–1969)
- Motto: Levo Oculos Meos In Montes (Latin)
- Motto in English: "I Lift My Eyes to the Mountains"
- Type: Public liberal arts college
- Established: September 12, 1927; 99 years ago
- Parent institution: University of North Carolina
- Accreditation: SACS
- Academic affiliations: COPLAC
- Endowment: $83.05 million (2025)
- Chancellor: Kimberly van Noort
- Faculty: 220 (fall 2022)
- Students: 3,054 (fall 2024)
- Undergraduates: 3,030 (fall 2024)
- Postgraduates: 24 (fall 2024)
- Location: Asheville, North Carolina, United States
- Campus: 365 acres (1.48 km^{2}); Small city
- Newspaper: The Blue Banner
- Colors: Blue and white
- Nickname: Bulldogs
- Sporting affiliations: NCAA Division I – Big South; ASUN
- Mascot: Rocky
- Website: unca.edu
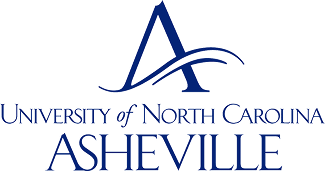

The University of North Carolina at Asheville (UNC Asheville, UNCA, or simply Asheville) is a public liberal arts university in Asheville, North Carolina, United States. UNC Asheville is the designated liberal arts institution in the University of North Carolina system. It is a member and the headquarters of the Council of Public Liberal Arts Colleges.

== History ==
UNC Asheville was founded in 1927 as Buncombe County Junior College, part of the Buncombe County public school system. It was the first tuition-free public college in North Carolina. It was located in the Biltmore School in south Asheville on Hendersonville Road (U.S. 25). In 2001, the original Biltmore School building was recognized by the Save America's Treasures program.

During the Great Depression, the college started charging tuition. In 1930 the school merged with the College of the City of Asheville (founded in 1928) to form Biltmore Junior College. In 1934 the college was renamed Biltmore College. In 1936, the name changed to Asheville-Biltmore College, and control was transferred to the Asheville City Schools.

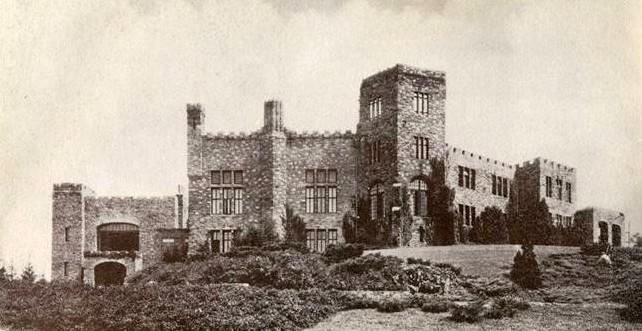
Overlook in 1920

In 1949, the college relocated to the 20,000-square foot Overlook Castle, also known as Seely's Caste, which included 29 acres on the crest of Sunset Mountain. Evelyn Grove Seely, widow of Fred Loring Seely, sold Overlook to the college $125,000; she also donated $50,000 to the acquisition fund. The college renamed the house Seely Hall, as requested by the seller. The house, no longer part of the college, was named to the National Register of Historic Places in 1980.

In 1961, Asheville-Biltmore College moved to the present UNC Asheville campus in north Asheville. That year, the college desegregated with the enrollment of Etta Mae Whitner Patterson. In 1963, it became a state-supported four-year college and awarded its first bachelor's degrees in 1966. Its first residence halls were built in 1967. It adopted its current name in 1969 upon becoming part of the Consolidated University of North Carolina, since 1972 called the University of North Carolina System.

UNC Asheville desegregated its faculty in 1981, along with all schools in the University of North Carolina. It is one of three baccalaureate colleges within the University of North Carolina System, and has been classified as a Liberal Arts I institution since 1992.

=== Administration ===
The university operates under the guidance and policies of the Board of Trustees of the University of North Carolina at Asheville. Members of the board are appointed by the governor of North Carolina. As part of the seventeen-campus University of North Carolina System, UNC Asheville also falls under the administration of the system's president. The UNC System is administered by the UNC Board of Governors, which is elected by the North Carolina Legislature, and advised by the UNC Faculty Assembly. Kimberly van Noort, former interim provost and interim chancellor of UNC Asheville, became the university's chancellor on January 1, 2024.

=== Chief executive officers ===
==== President or dean ====
- 1927–1932: S.B. Conley, dean
- 1932–1936: A.C. Reynolds, president
- 1936–1941: Charles A. Lloyd, dean
- 1945–1946: William H. Morgan, dean
- 1946–1947: Clarence N. Gilbert, dean
- 1947–1947: R.A. Tomberlin, president
- 1947–1962: Glenn L. Bushey, president
- 1962–1969: William E. Highsmith, president

==== Chancellor ====
- 1969–1977: William E. Highsmith
- 1977–1977: Arnold K. King, acting
- 1977–1984: William E. Highsmith
- 1984–1990: David G. Brown
- 1990–1991: Roy Carroll, interim
- 1991–1993: Samuel Schuman
- 1994–1994: Larry Wilson, interim
- 1994–1999: Patsy Reed
- 1999–2005: James H. Mullen, Jr.
- 2005–2014: Anne Ponder
- 2014–2015: Doug Orr, interim
- 2015–2017: Mary K. Grant
- 2017–2018: Joseph Urgo, interim
- 2018–2022: Nancy J. Cable
- 2022–2024: Kimberly van Noort, interim
- 2024: Kimberly van Noort

== Campus ==
The campus includes 365 acres in a small city setting. Noteworthy campus features include:

- Bob Moog Electric Music Studio, named for Robert Moog, former professor and inventor of the Moog synthesizer.
- Botanical Gardens at Asheville is adjacent to campus and features 600 plant species on ten acres with walking trails.
- Carol Belk Theatre seats 200 people and is used for Theatre UNCA and other performances.
- Kimmel Arena, with seating for 3,200 people, is used for basketball and concerts.
- Lookout Observatory for astronomical research is open to the public for stargazing and includes a collection of images from the universe.
- N.C. Center for Health & Wellness, including biofeedback lab and meditation space
- Wilma Dykeman Writers-in-Residence home
- S. Tucker Cooke Gallery is used for student and faculty art exhibits.
- Earthworks from the Civil War Battle of Asheville are preserved on campus.

== Academics ==
=== Curriculum ===
UNC Asheville operates on a semester calendar. It offers four-year undergraduate programs leading to Bachelor of Arts, Bachelor of Fine Arts, and Bachelor of Science degrees in 36 majors, and is classified by the Carnegie Classification of Institutions of Higher Education as a Baccalaureate College–Arts & Sciences (Bac/A&S).

The University's most popular majors include psychology, art, environmental science, biology, business, and English. It also offers joint degrees with North Carolina State University, including a 2-2 B.S. in engineering, a 3-1 B.S. in engineering, and a joint B.S. in engineering in mechatronics concentration.

All students complete a capstone or culminating academic experience. UNC Asheville founded the National Conference on Undergraduate Research and has hosted the event five times. Some sixty percent of students complete undergraduate research or creative projects. Around twenty percent of students participate in study abroad or study away. More than 48 of its graduates have received Fulbright Fellowships.

Located on campus, the Osher Lifelong Learning Institute has some 220 faculty and offers more than 350 classes each year.

=== Faculty ===
UNC Asheville had 217 full-time faculty members in 2026, with 84 percent holding terminal degrees in their field. Another 99 faculty serve part-time. Faculty teach all classes; there are no teaching assistants. Nearly 60 percent of the classes have fewer than 20 students. As of 2024, the student-faculty ratio was 13:1.

=== Admissions ===
UNC Asheville's acceptance rate for the fall of 2024 was 92 percent. At that time, total enrollment was 3,030, with 59 percent female students and 41 percent male students. As of fall 2020, students came from 43 states and 17 countries; 12 percent of the current study body was from outside of North Carolina. The student demographics in the fall of 2024 were 73 percent White, 10 percent Hispanic, 6 percent Black, 4 percent two or more races, 2 percent Asian, 2 percent international, and 3 percent unknown. 2,676 of the enrollees were full-time students and 24 were post-graduate students.

There are deadlines for admissions, and either an ACT or SAT is required. In the 2020–2021 academic year, 35 percent of students received a Pell Grant.

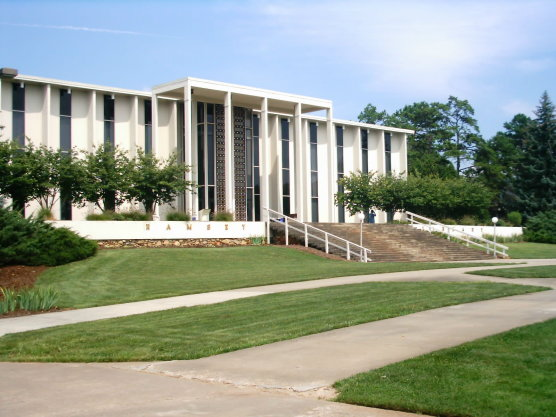
D. Hiden Ramsey Library

=== Library ===
D. Hiden Ramsey Library is located in the center of campus. It includes the Media Design Lab and the crAFT (Creativity, Art, Fabrication, and Technology) Studio. The library's holdings include Special Collections and University Archives which started in 1977 as the Southern Highlands Research Center and focuses on the history Asheville and Western North Carolina. Annually, the library gives the Ramsey Library Community Author Award; the winner receives a yearlong residency in the library.

=== Rankings and reputation ===
In 2026, UNC Asheville's ranking in U.S. News & World Report was tied for 10th place in Top Public Liberal Arts Schools and tied for 135th in National Liberal Arts Colleges. UNC Asheville also tied for 141st in Best Undergraduate Engineering Program for institutions that do not offer a doctorate.

Academic rankings

Liberal arts
- U.S. News & World Report: 135
- Washington Monthly: 76

National
- Forbes: 494
- WSJ/College Pulse: 501–600

The Princeton Review ranked UNC Asheville as number six for Green Matters, number nine for LGBTQ-Friendly, number 25 for Best Quality of Life, number 22 for Most Politically Active Students, and number 15 for its College City.

The 2024 edition of The Fiske Guide named UNC Asheville a best-buy; the list only includes ten public and ten private universities from across the United States. In 2019, Forbes magazine ranked UNC Asheville number 494 in top colleges, number 176 in public colleges, and number 165 in liberal arts universities. Washington Monthly ranked UNC Asheville number 76 on its 2022 Best Bang for the Buck Rankings: Southeast and number 77 for its national liberal arts colleges ranking.

== Student life ==
Undergraduate demographics as of fall 2023
| Race and ethnicity | Total |
|---|---|
| White | 74% |
| Hispanic | 10% |
| Black | 5% |
| Two or more races | 5% |
| Unknown | 3% |
| International student | 2% |
| Asian | 1% |
Economic diversity
| Low-income (Note: The percentage of students who received an income-based federal Pell grant intended for low-income students.) | 34% |
| Affluent (Note: The percentage of students who are a part of the American middle class at the bare minimum.) | 66% |

=== Organizations and activities ===
There are more than seventy campus clubs and organizations. Student activities include two fraternity and one sorority, with one percent of males belonging to a fraternity and one percent of females belonging to the one sorority. Some 44 percent of students participate in a service learning project, while 11 percent participate in intramural sports. One of the student organizations is the OBC, UNC Asheville's secret society.

UNC Asheville's Student Government Association (SGA) consists of two branches, an eighteen-seat Student Senate and an executive branch comprising a president, vice-president, and Cabinet. UNCA Out is a student group dedicated to students who identify as lesbian, gay, bisexual, trans, asexual, queer, questioning, two-spirit, intersexed, and straight allies.

UNC Asheville's Concerts on the Quad features weekly outdoor concerts during the summer months. The North Asheville Tailgate Market is open Saturdays, April through November, and features around 40 local vendors.

=== Dining ===
UNC Asheville Dining Services is located in Brown Dining Hall. They serve about 265,000 meals annually, and donate to Food Connections weekly.

=== Housing ===
In the fall of 2021, 46 percent of students lived on campus.

== Athletics ==
UNC Asheville's athletics teams are known as the Bulldogs. They are a member of the NCAA's Division I and compete in the Big South Conference. The university's colors are blue and white. Men's sports include baseball, basketball, cross country, soccer, tennis, and both indoor and outdoor track and field. Women's sports include basketball, cross country, diving, golf, soccer, swimming, tennis, indoor and outdoor track and field, and volleyball.

== Notable people ==
Some of the university's notable alumni include professional baseball players Tony Campana and Ty Wigginton, author Wiley Cash, Emmy Award winning filmmaker Jethro Waters, and U.S. Congressman Roy A. Taylor. Notable faculty and staff include Robert Moog who invented the Moog synthesizer, former provost and vice-chacellor Jane Fernandes, historian Grant Hardy, and former basketball coaches Monte Towe and Eddie Biedenbach.
