= Journal of Elasticity =

- Language: English
- Edited by: Roger Fosdick

Publication details
- History: 1971-present
- Publisher: Springer Science+Business Media
- Frequency: 7/year
- Impact factor: 2.085 (2020)

Standard abbreviations
- ISO 4: J. Elast.
- MathSciNet: J. Elasticity

Indexing
- ISSN: 0374-3535 (print); 1573-2681 (web)
- LCCN: 72624248
- OCLC no.: 300184711

Links
- Journal homepage

Journal of Elasticity: The Physical and Mathematical Science of Solids is a peer-reviewed scientific journal covering all aspects of elasticity. It is published seven times a year by Springer Science+Business Media. The editor-in-chief is Roger Fosdick (University of Minnesota).

== Abstracting and indexing ==
According to the Journal Citation Reports, the journal had a 2020 impact factor of 2.085. The journal is abstracted and indexed in:

- Academic OneFile
- Astrophysics Data System
- GeoRef
- INSPEC
- VINITI
- Science Citation Index
- Scopus
