= Martin Z. Bazant =

American chemical engineer

Martin Zdenek Bazant
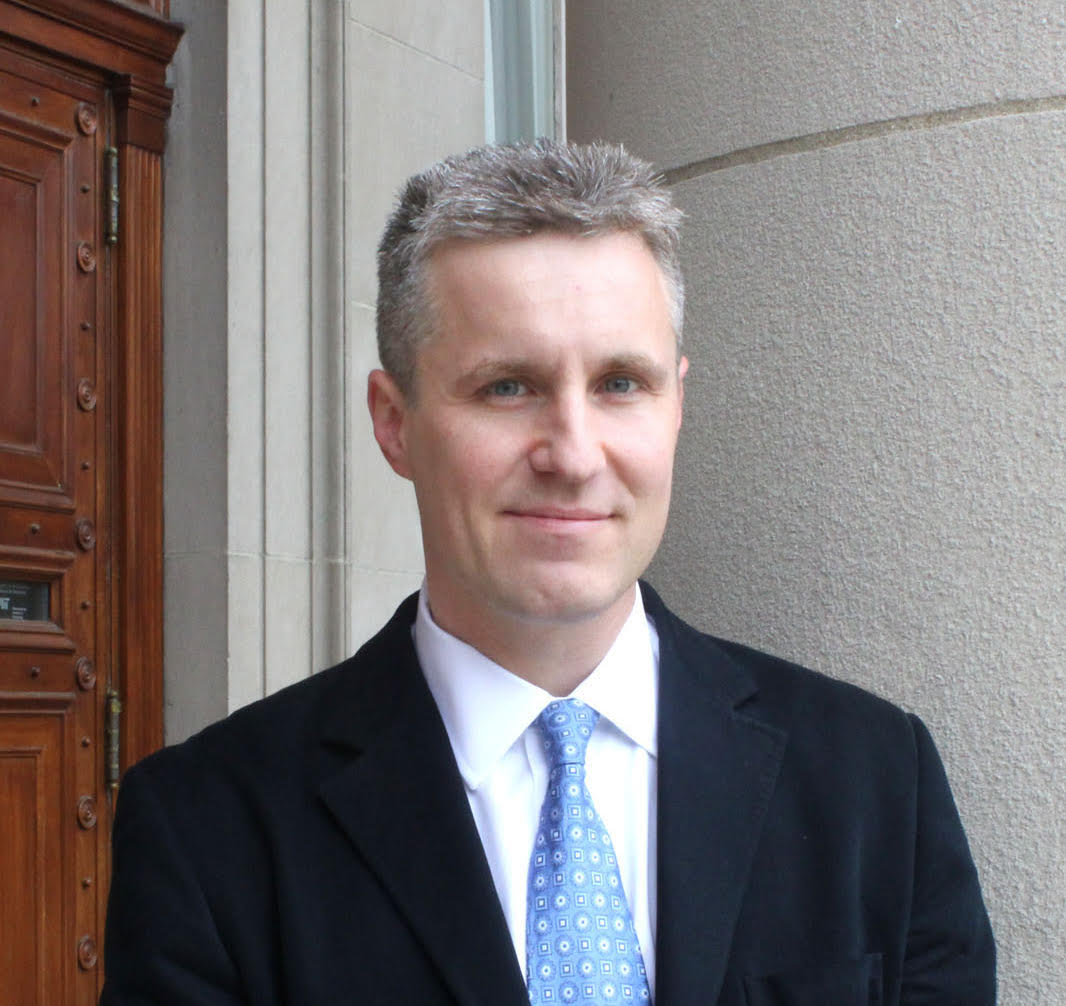
- Occupation: Chemical engineer

Academic background
- Education: BS., Mathematics and Physics; MS., Applied Mathematics; PhD., Physics
- Alma mater: University of Arizona; Harvard University
- Thesis: Interatomic Forces in Covalent Solids (1997)
- Doctoral advisor: Efthimios Kaxiras

Academic work
- Institutions: Massachusetts Institute of Technology; Saint-Gobain; Lithios

Martin Zdenek Bazant is an American chemical engineer. He holds the positions of Chevron Professor of Chemical Engineering and Mathematics at the Massachusetts Institute of Technology (MIT).

Bazant's research focuses on electrochemistry, electrokinetics, transport phenomena, and applied mathematics. He is a fellow of the American Physical Society and the International Society of Electrochemistry as well as a member of the National Academy of Engineering.

== Education ==
Bazant received a bachelor's degree in mathematics and physics in 1992, followed by a master's degree in Applied Mathematics in 1993, both from the University of Arizona. He then enrolled at Harvard University and completed his Ph.D. in Physics, conducting his research in Efthimios Kaxiras' research group in 1997.

== Career ==
Bazant began his academic career as an instructor of Applied Mathematics at Massachusetts Institute of Technology in 1998. He was appointed assistant professor of Mathematics in 2000, promoted to associate professor in 2003, and granted tenure in 2007. In 2009, he joined the Department of Chemical Engineering and built a laboratory to conduct theoretical research. He assumed the role of professor in 2012 and was named the inaugural Edwin G. Roos (1944) Chair Professor of Chemical Engineering in 2015. From 2016 to 2020, he held the position of executive officer of the Department of Chemical Engineering at MIT and subsequently as its first digital learning officer.

In 2019, Bazant assumed the role of the first president of the International Electrokinetics Society. He has created open educational resources, including OpenCourseWare for Random Walks and Diffusion and Electrochemical Energy Systems, and massive open online courses (MOOCs) such as 10.50x Analysis of Transport Phenomena.

== Research ==
Bazant's research has spanned the fields of electrochemistry, electrokinetics, fluid dynamics and transport phenomena in chemical engineering, applied mathematics, and theoretical physics. In electrochemistry, he has made contributions to a nonequilibrium thermodynamic theory of electrochemical kinetics and associated phase-field models of lithium-ion batteries, such as anisotropic intercalation and reaction-limited phase separation. His work suggested thermodynamically consistent phase-field models for lithium intercalation, such as the Cahn-Hilliard reaction (CHR) framework and extensions, to investigate size-dependent phase separation, boundary kinetics, and coherency strain in electrode nanoparticles. In collaboration with colleagues, he has created non-equilibrium thermodynamic theories coupled with intercalation kinetics and solid-state diffusion to simulate and validate dynamic behavior of active materials at the particle scale. He derived the overpotential from a variational principle and provide a thermodynamically consistent basis for phase field modeling of electrochemical systems.

Bazant has formulated a theory of coupled ion–electron transfer (CIET) kinetics that makes the distinction between electron-transfer-limited and ion-transfer-limited regimes, the former being similar to Marcus–Hush–Chidsey kinetics and more accurately modeling experimental CO_{2} reduction behavior. He proposed a generalized transport-reaction theory that combines the Poisson–Nernst–Planck equations, Butler–Volmer kinetics, and Marcus theory in a phase field formulation, going beyond the classical porous electrode model.

Using the Poisson–Nernst–Planck framework, Bazant devised dynamic models of electric double layers and ion transport in porous electrodes, identifying supercapacitor and desalination regimes linked to transmission line behavior. His and Biesheuvel's modified Donnan model (mDM), which incorporates a Stern layer and a non-electrostatic attractive potential, has been used to describe ion adsorption in micropores of porous electrodes in capacitive deionization. In applied mathematics, his research introduced "induced-charge electro-osmosis" and new mathematical models, such as the Bazant-Storey-Kornyshev (BSK) equation, which incorporates lattice-gas entropy and a biharmonic term in the electrostatic potential and has been used to study electrokinetic phenomena. Furthermore, his work extended conformal mapping to a class of non-harmonic functions, generalized diffusion-limited aggregation, and proposed solutions to the Navier-Stokes equations. He also investigated the use of matched asymptotic expansions in electrochemical engineering.

As of July 2025, his work has received 34,825 citations according to Scopus.

== Awards and honors ==
- 2015 – Alexander Kuznetsov Prize in Theoretical Electrochemistry, International Society of Electrochemistry
- 2017 – Fellow, International Society of Electrochemistry
- 2018 – Fellow, American Physical Society
- 2018 – Andreas Acrivos Award for Professional Progress in Chemical Engineering, American Institute of Chemical Engineers
- 2019 – MITx Prize for Teaching and Learning in MOOCs, Massachusetts Institute of Technology
- 2025 – Member, National Academy of Engineering

== Selected articles ==
- Bazant, M. Z.; Thornton, K.; Ajdari, A. (2004). "Diffuse-charge dynamics in electrochemical systems". Physical Review E. 70 (2) 021506. arXiv:cond-mat/0401118. Bibcode:2004PhRvE..70b1506B. doi:10.1103/PhysRevE.70.021506.
- Bazant, M. Z. (2004). "Conformal mapping of some non-harmonic functions in transport theory". Proceedings of the Royal Society of London. Series A. 460 (2045): 1433–1452. arXiv:physics/0302086. Bibcode:2004RSPSA.460.1433B. doi:10.1098/rspa.2003.1218.
- Bazant, M. Z.; Moffatt, H. K. (2005). "Exact solutions of the Navier-Stokes equations having steady vortex structures". Journal of Fluid Mechanics. 541: 55–64. Bibcode:2005JFM...541...55B. doi:10.1017/S0022112005006130.
- Bazant, M. Z.; Kilic, M. S.; Storey, B. D.; Ajdari, A. (2009). "Towards an understanding of induced-charge electrokinetics at large applied voltages in concentrated solutions". Advances in Colloid and Interface Science. 152 (1–2): 48–88. arXiv:0903.4790. doi:10.1016/j.cis.2009.10.001. PMID 19879552.
- Bazant, M. Z.; Storey, B. D.; Kornyshev, A. A. (2011). "Double layer in ionic liquids: Overscreening versus crowding". Physical Review Letters. 106 (4) 046102. arXiv:1010.3490. Bibcode:2011PhRvL.106d6102B. doi:10.1103/PhysRevLett.106.046102. PMID 21405339.
- Bazant, M. Z. (2013). "Theory of chemical kinetics and charge transfer based on nonequilibrium thermodynamics". Accounts of Chemical Research. 46 (5): 1144–1160. arXiv:1208.1587. doi:10.1021/ar300145c. PMID 23520980.
- Bazant, M. Z. (2017). "Thermodynamic stability of driven open systems and control of phase separation by electro-autocatalysis". Faraday Discussions. 199: 423–463. arXiv:1704.00608. Bibcode:2017FaDi..199..423B. doi:10.1039/C7FD00037E. PMID 28573280.
- Bazant, M. Z.; Bush, J. W. (2021). "A guideline to limit indoor airborne transmission of COVID-19". Proceedings of the National Academy of Sciences. 118 (17) e2018995118. Bibcode:2021PNAS..11818995B. doi:10.1073/pnas.2018995118. PMC 8092463. PMID 33858987.
- Bazant, M. Z. (2023). "Unified quantum theory of electrochemical kinetics by coupled ion–electron transfer". Faraday Discussions. 246: 60–124. Bibcode:2023FaDi..246...60B. doi:10.1039/D3FD00108C. hdl:1721.1/154129. PMID 37676178.
