= International Journal of Fracture =

- Discipline: Materials
- Language: English
- Edited by: K. Ravi-Chandar

Publication details
- Publisher: Springer (Netherlands)
- Frequency: monthly
- Impact factor: 2.175 (2017)

Standard abbreviations
- ISO 4: Int. J. Fract.

Indexing
- ISSN: 0376-9429 (print); 0376-9429 (web)

Links
- Journal homepage

The International Journal of Fracture is a scientific journal focused on fracture in materials science. Founded in 1965, it is published by Springer. The journal publishes original analytical, numerical and experimental contributions which provide improved understanding of the mechanisms of micro and macro fracture in all materials, and their engineering implications. The journal has an impact factor of 2.175 (2017).
