= Microplane model for constitutive laws of materials =

The microplane model, conceived in 1984, is a material constitutive model for progressive softening damage. Its advantage over the classical tensorial constitutive models is that it can capture the oriented nature of damage such as tensile cracking, slip, friction, and compression splitting, as well as the orientation of fiber reinforcement. Another advantage is that the anisotropy of materials such as gas shale or fiber composites can be effectively represented. To prevent unstable strain localization (and spurious mesh sensitivity in finite element computations), this model must be used in combination with some nonlocal continuum formulation (e.g., the crack band model). Prior to 2000, these advantages were outweighed by greater computational demands of the material subroutine, but thanks to huge increase of computer power, the microplane model is now routinely used in computer programs, even with tens of millions of finite elements.

== Method and motivation ==
The basic idea of the microplane model is to express the constitutive law not in terms of tensors, but in terms of the vectors of stress and strain acting on planes of various orientations called the microplanes. The use of vectors was inspired by G. I. Taylor's idea in 1938 which led to Taylor models for plasticity of polycrystalline metals. But the microplane models differ conceptually in two ways.

Firstly, to prevent model instability in post-peak softening damage, the kinematic constraint must be used instead of the static one. Thus, the strain (rather than stress) vector on each microplane is the projection of the macroscopic strain tensor, i.e.,

$$\varepsilon_N = \varepsilon_{ij}N_{ij} ~~ \varepsilon_M = \varepsilon_{ij}M_{ij} ~~ \varepsilon_L = \varepsilon_{ij}L_{ij}$$

where $\varepsilon_N, \varepsilon_M$ and $\varepsilon_L$ are the normal vector and two strain vectors corresponding to each microplane, and $N_{ij} = n_i n_j, M_{ij} = (n_i m_j + m_i n_j)/2$ and $L_{ij} = (n_i \ell_j + \ell_i n_j)/2$ where $n_i, m_i$ and $\ell_i$ are three mutually orthogonal vectors, one normal and two tangential, characterizing each particular microplane (subscripts $i,j=1,2,3$ refer to Cartesian coordinates).

Secondly, a variational principle (or the principle of virtual work) relates the stress vector components on the microplanes ($\sigma_N, \sigma_M$ and $\sigma_L$) to the macro-continuum stress tensor $\sigma_{ij}$, to ensure equilibrium. This yields for the stress tensor the expression:

$$\sigma_{ij} = \frac{3}{2 \pi} \int_\Omega s_{ij}\, d\Omega
\approx 6 \sum_{\mu=1}^{N_m} w_\mu s_{ij}^{(\mu)}$$

with

$$s_{ij} = \sigma_N N_{ij} + \sigma_L L_{ij} + \sigma_M M_{ij}$$

Here $\Omega$ is the surface of a unit hemisphere, and the sum is an approximation of the integral. The weights, $w_\mu (\mu = 1, 2,\ldots,n_M)$, are based on an optimal Gaussian integration formula for a spherical surface. At least 21 microplanes are needed for acceptable accuracy but 37 are distinctly more accurate.

The inelastic or damage behavior is characterized by subjecting the microplane stresses $\sigma_N, \sigma_M$ and $\sigma_L$ to strain-dependent strength limits called stress-strain boundaries imposed on each microplane. They are of four types, viz.:

1. The tensile normal boundary – to capture progressive tensile fracturing;
2. The compressive volumetric boundary – to capture phenomenon such as pore collapse under extreme pressures;
3. The shear boundary – to capture friction; and
4. The compressive deviatoric boundary – to capture softening in compression, using the volumetric stress $\sigma_V = \sigma_{kk}/3$ and deviatoric stress $\sigma_D = \sigma_N - \sigma_V$ on the microplanes.

Each step of explicit analysis begins with an elastic predictor and, if the boundary has been exceeded, the stress vector component on the microplane is then dropped at constant strain to the boundary.

== Applications ==
The microplane constitutive model for damage in concrete evolved since 1984 through a series of progressively improved models labeled M0, M1, M2, ..., M7. It was also extended to fiber composites (woven or braided laminates), rock, jointed rock mass, clay, sand, foam, polymers and metal. The microplane model has been shown to allow close fits of the concrete test data for uniaxial, biaxial and triaxial loadings with post-peak softening, compression-tension load cycles, opening and mixed mode fractures, tension-shear and compression-shear failures, axial compression followed by torsion (i.e., the vertex effect) and fatigue. The loading rate effect and long-term aging creep of concrete have also been incorporated. Models M4 and M7 have been generalized to finite strain. The microplane model has been introduced into various commercial programs (ATENA, OOFEM, DIANA, SBETA,...) and large proprietary wavecodes (EPIC, PRONTO, MARS,...). Alternatively, it is often being used as the user's subroutine such as UMAT or VUMAT in ABAQUS.
