= Margaret MacVicar =

MIT physicist

Margaret L.A. MacVicar
- Born: November 20, 1943; Hamilton, Ontario, Canada
- Died: September 30, 1991 (aged 47); Boston, Massachusetts, U.S.
- Education: MIT
- Known for: Undergraduate Research Opportunities Program, MIT Dean for Undergraduate Education
- Scientific career
- Fields: Metallurgy
- Workplaces: MIT

Margaret L.A. (Scotty) MacVicar (November 20, 1943 – September 30, 1991) was an American physicist and educator. In addition to serving as MIT's Dean of Undergraduate Education (1985–1990), MacVicar is credited with founding the now widely emulated Undergraduate Research Opportunities Program (UROP) in 1969. MacVicar received her undergraduate and graduate degrees at MIT and joined the faculty, giving her the rare distinction of being a "MIT lifer."

== Background ==
MacVicar was born on November 20, 1943, in Hamilton, Ontario to George and Elizabeth MacVicar. Her family relocated to Flint, Michigan in 1946 where she lived until she graduated from high school in 1961. Because she had been taking classes at a local junior college as a high school student, a local retired General Motors senior executive offered to help defray the costs of attending MIT.

At MIT, she was one of the first residents of the McCormick Hall women's dormitory, which opened in the fall of 1963. She was the president of the Association of Women students, and also served as a physics tutor at McCormick Hall; Shirley Ann Jackson was one of the students she tutored. She received a Bachelor of Science degree in physics in 1964 (although she is often identified as a member of the class of 1965, with whom she entered MIT; compare and) and a doctor of science (Sc.D) degree in metallurgy and materials science in 1967. Between 1967 and 1969, she worked as a post-doctoral fellow in the Royal Society Mond section of the Cavendish Laboratory at the University of Cambridge. In 1969, she joined the department of physics at MIT, where her research investigated high-temperature metal and ceramic superconductors, single crystal and thin-film materials research, and detecting corrosion kinetics using superconducting magnetometry.

As dean for undergraduate education, she worked to recruit more women, minorities, and students of varied interests, implemented changes in the humanities and social science requirements, and publicly criticized a Department of Defense policy barring homosexuals from ROTC programs.

MacVicar was awarded an honorary Doctor of Science from Clarkson University in 1985. She was Orator at the 1984 Literary Exercises of Phi Beta Kappa at Harvard University; Cecil and Ida Green Distinguished Lecturer at the University of Texas in 1979; and Vollmer W. Fries Lecturer at Rensselaer Polytechnic Institute in 1976. She was a member of the corporations of the Charles S. Draper Laboratory and Woods Hole Oceanographic Institution, a trustee of Radcliffe College and of the Boston Museum of Science, and a director of Exxon Corporation, the Harvard/MIT Cooperative Society and H. W. Brady Company. She was a fellow of the American Physical Society. In 1986, MacVicar was awarded the Valeria A. Knapp Award by The College Club of Boston in memory of the teacher and director of The Winsor School, a girls' college prep school, from 1951 to 1963.

She died on September 30, 1991, at the Dana–Farber Cancer Institute, a year after being diagnosed with cancer.

== Undergraduate Research Opportunities Program ==
MIT is deeply committed to the premise that undergraduates should inhabit a very special world-that of a moral and intellectual universe with certain fixed stars, but also with wide spaces in between where students can find room to wander and to make their own paths.

— Margaret MacVicar

MacVicar established the Undergraduate Research Opportunities Program (UROP) in 1969 based upon a suggestion from Edwin H. Land. The program allows undergraduates to gain hands-on research experience with faculty members around the university and provides the laboratories with the funds to employ the students. More than 3,000 undergraduates (75% of the undergraduate population) participate annually. The program has since been cited as a model educational program by the Department of Education, National Science Foundation, and several private foundations.

== MacVicar Faculty Fellows ==
Each year, beginning in 1992, members of the faculty are selected as Margaret MacVicar Faculty Fellows "to recognize faculty members who have profoundly influenced our students through their sustained and significant contributions to teaching and curriculum development." The fellows are appointed for a ten-year term and receive support from the Teaching and Learning Laboratory. The fellows are announced on "MacVicar Day" in early March with roundtable discussions and symposia centered on various facets of undergraduate education such as curriculum requirements, mentoring, classrooms, international exposure.

== Margaret L. A. MacVicar ’65, ScD ’67 Award ==
The MIT Alumni Association and MIT created the Margaret L. A. MacVicar ’65, ScD ’67 Award, and each year "is given in recognition of innovation, dedication and meaningful impact for the Alumni Association or the Institute in any area of volunteer activity, demonstrating strong potential for future volunteer leadership for the Alumni Association."
