= Undergraduate Research Opportunities Program =

An Undergraduate Research Opportunities Program provides funding and/or credit to undergraduate students who volunteer for faculty-mentored research projects pertaining to all academic disciplines.

== Participating universities ==
Universities involved include the University of Hawaiʻi, The University of Queensland, Boston University, the Georgia Institute of Technology (Georgia Tech), the University of California, Irvine, California State University, Long Beach, the Massachusetts Institute of Technology (MIT), the University of Michigan, the Hong Kong University of Science and Technology (HKUST), the University of Minnesota, the University of Illinois Urbana-Champaign, the RWTH Aachen University, Imperial College London, the University of New Hampshire, the Politecnico di Torino and the Nanyang Technological University.

== Founding and purpose ==
The MIT program was founded in 1969, and the program at the University of Michigan was founded in the 1989 (primarily to help minorities and women break into science and mathematics). The University of California, Irvine founded its program in 1995. In the United Kingdom, Imperial College London provides a program for doing research in most of its departments for undergraduates at Imperial. Furthermore, the UROP scheme is also available at the University of Cambridge, the University of Reading, the University of Essex and the National University of Singapore. In 2008 the RWTH Aachen University started the first international UROP program for students from the United States and Canada in Germany. The University of Sussex runs a similar scheme, across all of its departments, where undergraduates are funded for 6 weeks as Junior Research Associates. The California State University, Long Beach program does not serve transfer students.

== Calls ==
Students can apply for funding by submitting a proposal during "Calls for Proposals", which occur throughout the school year.

The Calls are announced on the school web sites and distributed to faculty members and the undergraduate counseling offices. Students have approximately one month from the announcement to submit their proposals. All undergraduate students from all disciplines and majors who are participating in a research project with a faculty advisor (usually a full-time professor at the university) eligible to respond to the current Call for Proposals if they are in good academic standing with the school.

== Proposals ==
Proposals are prepared by the student applicant and jointly submitted by the student and the faculty advisors. UROP funds a variety of projects with grants depending upon the merits of the project. At University of California, Irvine, an individual student may receive up to $1,000 through UROP for projects during the school year, to help pay for supplies and other necessary materials. Alternatively, University of California, Irvine students may also apply for a prestigious summer fellowship, by which they may be awarded as much as $3,000 per project, which is meant to reward them for their time and efforts. Higher amounts may be awarded for group projects. The UROP Faculty Advisory Board reviews proposals and decides whether the project merits funding. The UROP Faculty Advisory Board also makes the funding recommendations.

== Completion and submission ==
Upon completion of the year-long research project, students are expected to present their findings at the school's research symposium. Although not a requirement, some students may submit their written reports (ranging from 15-25 pages) to the faculty committee in order to be considered for publication in the university's research journals. Publication in the UROP undergraduate research journal is known to be extremely competitive. In many cases, students are asked to submit numerous drafts to the faculty committee for review, only to find out that their papers are later denied publication. In the past, a mere 5% of all submissions were accepted for publication in the University of California, Irvine and Massachusetts Institute of Technology journals.
