= Gerald Posner =

American journalist and author

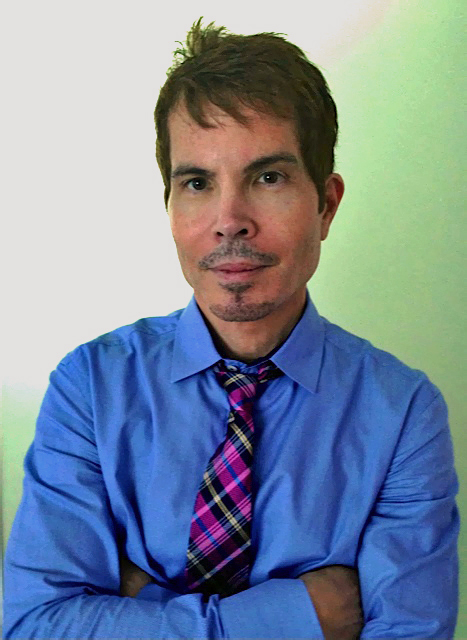
- Posner in 2013 in Miami
- Born: Gerald Leo Posner; May 20, 1954 (age 72); San Francisco, California, U.S.
- Occupation: Writer
- Spouse: Trisha Posner

Gerald Leo Posner (born May 20, 1954) is an American investigative journalist and author of thirteen books, including Case Closed: Lee Harvey Oswald and the Assassination of JFK (1993), which explores the John F. Kennedy assassination and Killing the Dream: James Earl Ray and the Assassination of Martin Luther King, Jr. (1998), about the assassination of Martin Luther King, Jr. A plagiarism scandal involving articles that Posner wrote for The Daily Beast and his book Miami Babylon arose in 2010.

== Early life and education ==
Posner was born in San Francisco, California, the only child of Jerry and Gloria Posner. His father was Jewish and his mother Catholic, and both were native San Franciscans. His father was a labor union official.

Posner was raised Catholic. He was educated at St. Ignatius College Preparatory and graduated summa cum laude from the University of California, Berkeley in 1975. In 1978, he earned his J.D. from the University of California, Hastings College of the Law, where he served as the associate executive editor for the university's Law Review.

At age 23, he joined the law firm, Cravath, Swaine & Moore, as one of the youngest attorneys ever hired by the firm. In 1980, he went into private practice with a partner. In 1981, he represented Deborah Ann Fountain, Miss New York State, against the Miss America pageant after Fountain was disqualified for padding her bra. He left the law in 1986, when his first book, about Nazi Josef Mengele's life on the run, was published by McGraw Hill.

== Journalism career ==
=== Mengele: The Complete Story ===
Posner's first book, co-written with British journalist John Ware, was the 1986 biography Mengele: The Complete Story. The book was the result of a five-year pro bono lawsuit that Posner brought on behalf of survivors of Josef Mengele's medical experiments at Auschwitz. Posner and Ware obtained exclusive access to 5,000 pages of Mengele's diaries and personal papers for their book. The book was critically recognized as the "definitive" biography of Mengele.

Posner testified before the United States Senate in 1986 about how Mengele used an International Red Cross passport to travel safely from Europe to Argentina in 1949. He also testified about the discovery made by himself and Ware that Mengele had twice been captured by U.S. Army troops in 1945, but released both times before authorities realized he was on several wanted lists.

In June 1986, Posner appeared with Mengele's only son, Rolf Mengele, on the Phil Donahue Show. Syndicated columnist, Lewis Grizzard, called the hour-long live program "an incredibly compelling piece of television journalism."

Some of the content in Mengele: The Complete Story was used by the United States Department of Justice's Office of Special Investigations (OSI), which in, February 1985, began an in-depth investigation into Mengele's post-war activities and whereabouts. The investigation, done in conjunction with the United States Marshals Service, was launched after allegations that Mengele was at any time in the custody of or had any relationship with U.S. government institutions or personnel after World War II. In its official report to the Attorney General of the United States in 1992, In the Matter of Josef Mengele, OSI noted it was indebted to Posner for obtaining a witness statement concerning Mengele's whereabouts from October 1945 to August 1, 1948.

=== Warlords of Crime ===
In 1988, Posner published Warlords of Crime: Chinese Secret Societies: The New Mafia, an exposé of Triads and international heroin syndicates. Posner, and his wife, Trisha, traveled to Hong Kong, the Golden Triangle, the Netherlands, San Francisco, London and New York to conduct in-person research with drug traffickers. Clarence Petersen, reviewing the book for the Chicago Tribune, commented, "Posner ... is persuasive for the facts he gathered, all the more so because his narrative is largely the story of how he got the story, what he was told by the criminals and by law enforcement agents here and abroad and, most persuasive of all, what he saw with his own eyes. He does not dramatize; he doesn't have to. The chilling story he unearthed speaks for itself." Former New York detective and best-selling novelist, Dorothy Uhnak, wrote in The New York Times that "Warlords of Crime is powerful, frightening and, unfortunately, nonfiction."

Touchstone Pictures purchased the film rights to Warlords of Crime.

=== The Bio-Assassins ===
Posner's only novel is a biological warfare thriller set in the Cold War. According to Publishers Weekly, "Posner's first novel, a thriller whose development depends heavily on the author's convincing descriptions of the technology in intelligence work. The narrative works within the current conventions of its genre: principle is a mask for expedience; cynicism displaces conviction; proficiency implies virtue. But Posner, author of nonfiction works on Josef Mengele and Chinese secret societies, handles his material well. His descriptions move smartly; his characters, while somewhat two-dimensional, are convincing in their context; and his plot is constructed to satisfy demanding readers."

=== Hitler's Children ===
Posner's 1991 book, Hitler's Children: Sons and Daughters of Leaders of the Third Reich Talk About Themselves and Their Fathers, included in-depth interviews with a dozen children of top Nazi officials. The book was also well received. Karen Stabiner wrote in her review for the Los Angeles Times, "This is a mesmerizing, blood-chilling book, a set of oral histories of the sons and daughters of 11 of Hitler's top men. It is barely possible to read more than a few pages at a time; the contrast between innocent childhood experience, and the awful understanding of that experience that came with time, is enough to make you weep."

Christopher Lehmann-Haupt in The New York Times questioned whether Posner's book length treatment was necessary to study the children of Nazi perpetrators. "Perhaps it would have been more enlightening had Mr. Posner studied fewer cases more intensely, or even a single case from the most intimate point of view."

=== Case Closed ===
In his 1993 book Case Closed, Posner contended that Lee Harvey Oswald acted alone in the assassination of John F. Kennedy and Oswald's murderer, Jack Ruby, acted independently as well. Case Closed was a New York Times bestseller and a finalist for the 1994 Pulitzer Prize for History. It was also the subject of a double issue of U.S. News & World Report, and featured on programs such as ABC's 20/20, CBS Special Reports, and PBS's Frontline. The book was optioned for a television miniseries by David L. Wolper, the producer of the miniseries Roots. In his 2003 autobiography, Producer: A Memoir, Wolper cited his failure to get movies made of Case Closed and the Cuban Missile Crisis book, One Hell of a Gamble: Khrushchev, Castro, and Kennedy, as his two major career disappointments.

In 1993, Posner testified before the Legislation and National Security Subcommittee of the United States House Committee on Government Operations about the findings in Case Closed. In 1998, the Assassination Records Review Board briefly referenced this testimony in discussing two unsuccessful attempts to acquire the interview notes of two physicians, James Humes and J. Thornton Boswell, that Posner said he possessed.

Case Closed generally drew critical acclaim from the media; the Chicago Tribune, the Toronto Sun, The Sydney Morning Herald and Newsday all cited Posner's "meticulous" research in their respective reviews.

In his review for the Chicago Tribune, Jeffrey Toobin wrote, "Unlike many of the 2,000 other books that have been written about the Kennedy assassination, Posner's Case Closed is a resolutely sane piece of work. More importantly, Case Closed is utterly convincing in its thesis, which seems, in light of all that has transpired over the past 30 years, almost revolutionary. His thesis is this: Lee Harvey Oswald killed Kennedy by himself. ... I started Case Closed as a skeptic—and slightly put off by the presumptuous title. To my mind historical truth is always a slippery thing. The chances of knowing for sure what happened in any event—much less one as murky as the Kennedy assassination—seem remote. But this fascinating and important book won me over. Case closed, indeed."

Case Closed also drew widespread criticism from academics involved in assassination research as well as from non-academic assassination researchers who contended that it contained factual inaccuracies. For example, historian David Wrone wrote that "massive numbers of factual errors suffuse the book". Vincent Bugliosi, whose own book Reclaiming History largely agrees with Posner's conclusions, accused Posner of "omissions and distortions" but also described Case Closed as "an impressive work". "He is perhaps public enemy No. 1 to members of what might be called the JFK conspiracy industry," wrote journalist Paul Galloway.

Coinciding with the 50th anniversary of the assassination in 2013, Gallup released a national poll showing that while a majority (61%) of Americans still believed a conspiracy was behind JFK's death, the number of those who thought it was a lone assassin (30%) was the highest in 46 years. Although some mainstream media commentators such as The Independent said that "for Americans, JFK will never be case closed", others like The Economist cited "Case Closed" and concluded, "50 years on, face it, Oswald did it."

Historian Robert Dallek called Case Closed "authoritative," and said: "the best book on this subject is by a man named Gerald Posner, called 'Case Closed', I think he has responded very effectively to all the conspiracy theories, and there are so many of them." Pulitzer Prize–winning journalist, Hector Tobar wrote in the Los Angeles Times that Case Closed was "the book that cured me of JFK conspiracies once and for all."

Case Closed continued to generate widely divergent views. Film director Oliver Stone told a JFK assassination conference in Pittsburgh that Case Closed was discredited and "there's nothing in the movie (JFK) that I would go back on." Posner, on the day of the 50th anniversary, told CNN's Anderson Cooper that "the only thing he [Stone] gets right in 'JFK' is the date on which Kennedy is killed."

Posner was interviewed for the 1993 documentary Who Was Lee Harvey Oswald? produced by PBS's Frontline, and also for the 2022 documentary The Assassination & Mrs. Paine.

=== Killing the Dream ===
As controversial and talked-about as Case Closed was Posner's 1998 Killing the Dream: James Earl Ray and the Assassination of Martin Luther King, Jr. (Random House). The book concluded that confessed assassin, James Earl Ray, killed Martin Luther King Jr. acting alone, likely for the hope of collecting a racist bounty for the murder. Among other portions of his book, Posner tracked down for the first time the mysterious "Raoul", fingered by James Earl Ray as the mastermind of a conspiracy to kill King and to frame Ray. After setting out to settle Ray's Raoul story, Posner challenged as a hoax the widely printed conspiracy story that Green Beret snipers from the 20th Special Forces Group were in Memphis on the day of the assassination.

Killing the Dream was the largest private reinvestigation of the King assassination in 30 years. As was Case Closed, Killing the Dream was widely praised and embraced by the mainstream press, and among the national broadcasts that featured the book included CBS' 48 Hours, Charlie Rose and TODAY. Richard Bernstein in The New York Times wrote that the book was "the most comprehensive and definitive study of the King assassination to date... He [Posner] has rendered a valuable service by putting the King murder under his magnifying glass. One finishes this book reassured that no dark secrets remain, that no unexplained details need bedevil the national composure." Two-time Pulitzer Prize–winning journalist and columnist, Anthony Lewis, in The New York Times Book Review, said: "With Killing the Dream, he [Posner] has written a superb book: a model of investigation, meticulous in its discovery and presentation of evidence, unbiased in its exploration of every claim. And it is a wonderfully readable book, as gripping as a first-class detective story."

On the other hand, conspiracy theorists bristled at Killing the Dream, criticizing Posner for in part basing it on "a psychological evaluation of James Earl Ray, which he [Posner] is not qualified to give, and he dismisses evidence of conspiracy in King's murder as cynical attempts to exploit the tragedy". William Pepper, Ray's final defense attorney, repeatedly dismissed Posner's book as inaccurate and misleading.

Dexter King, one of Martin Luther King's sons, also criticized it. In 1999, the King family, represented by Pepper, brought a civil lawsuit in which a jury found evidence of a conspiracy involving Loyd Jowers, the owner of a restaurant near the assassination site. In response to that verdict, Posner told The New York Times, "It distresses me greatly that the legal system was used in such a callous and farcical manner in Memphis. If the King family wanted a rubber stamp of their own view of the facts, they got it."

=== Motown ===
Posner seemingly took a respite from assassination controversy in his 2003 book, Motown: Music, Money, Sex and Power, a business history of one of the most successful U.S. recording labels. The New York Times's Janet Maslin said the book was "actually a much more reputable book than its title suggests" and concludes that "Happily, Mr. Posner, a former Wall Street lawyer, has a good ear for tales, tall or otherwise. And he also assiduously digs into the business practices that turned the Motown story sour." Most of the mainstream press echoed the San Francisco Chronicle which concluded that "Posner offers the most objective and thoroughly accurate history of the label to date, plus a detailed and complex portrait of its founder, Berry Gordy". In his New York Times review of the 2013 Broadway show Motown: The Musical, Charles Isherwood noted: "For a full and coherent history of Mr. Gordy's game-changing music factory, you'd need to check out Gerald Posner's engrossing book 'Motown: Music, Money, Sex and Power.'" The criticism by some of Motown was that Posner was "tone deaf about music" but invariably noted that since he had written a business history, not a review of the label's music, "to his credit, Posner claims to be nothing more than a historian anyway ..."

=== Why America Slept ===
In 2003 Random House published Posner's Why America Slept, which discusses the conspiracy of the al-Qaeda terrorists who were responsible for the September 11, 2001, attacks. In the book, Posner claims that Prince Ahmed bin Salman bin Abdulaziz Al Saud had ties to al-Qaeda and advance knowledge of the 9/11 attacks. This assertion was strongly denied by Prince Ahmed's family, who pointed out that he in fact loved the U.S., spent time at his home there, and invested heavily in the U.S. horse racing industry. Prince Ahmed, two other Saudi princes named by Posner, and the chief of the Pakistani Air Force all died within days of each other from a blood clot after a simple operation, a car wreck involving only one vehicle, dehydration in the desert and a sabotaged helicopter explosion. Three of the men were in their forties, and one in his twenties. In Why America Slept, Posner became the first journalist to reveal the details of a U.S. interrogation against one of the highest-ranking al-Qaeda suspects caught to date. Why America Slept reached No. 2 on The New York Times Best Seller list.

=== Secrets of the Kingdom ===
In his 2005 book Secrets of the Kingdom: The Inside Story of the Secret Saudi-U.S. Connection, Posner provides an account of the "close" business and personal relationship between the House of Saud and the U.S. government, including discussions of "dirty bomb" technology and the financial and political maneuvering surrounding 9/11. Posner also asserts that the Saudis have built an elaborate doomsday scenario around their oil fields. The Saudis have denied this, and some skepticism has been expressed about the plausibility of Posner's account of such a scheme. According to Posner, he and his wife Trisha have been banned from entering Saudi Arabia as a result of the book.

=== Miami Babylon ===
This 2009 book explores the history of Miami Beach, with a particular focus on corruption, extravagance, and the drug trade. In a New York Times review, Byron Burroughs said: "Where Posner thrives is telling the stories of the first developers and artists who foresaw what Miami Beach would become and worked against all odds to build it." Some of the individuals interviewed by Posner for Miami Babylon have complained of severe misquoting and inaccuracies. Miami Babylon has been optioned for a television series. The original name for the book was listed as American Babylon, but it was changed prior to publication.

=== God's Bankers ===
God's Bankers is a 2015 book based on a 200-year history of Vatican finances and the Vatican Bank. It became Posner's third New York Times bestseller (after Case Closed and Why America Slept) on February 22, 2015.

In the New York Times, Damon Linker said that "God's Bankers provides an exhaustive history of financial machinations at the center of the church in Rome, from the final decades of the 19th century down to Pope Francis' sincere but as yet inconclusive efforts to reform the church's labyrinthine bureaucracy. ... From there Posner weaves an extraordinarily intricate tale of intrigue, corruption and organized criminality. ... The cumulative effect of Posner's detective work is an acute sensation of disgust—along with a mix of admiration for and skepticism about Pope Francis' efforts to reform the Vatican Bank and its curial enablers." Trine Tsouderos wrote in the Chicago Tribune: "Wall-Street-lawyer-turned-author Gerald Posner lays it all out in his deeply researched, passionately argued book, God's Bankers." According to Publishers Weekly, "Posner uses his superlative investigative skills to craft a fascinating and comprehensive look at the dark side of the Catholic Church ... Accessible and well written, Posner's is the definitive history of the topic to date." Kirkus Reviews said: "A dogged reporter exhaustively pursues the nefarious enrichment of the Vatican, from the Borgias to Pope Francis ... A meticulous work that cracks wide open the Vatican's legendary, enabling secrecy."

Booklist said that "A decade of exhaustive research into the deep and mysterious history of the Vatican's finances is a monumental task, but controversial author Posner proves more than up to this daunting challenge. ... It's a fast-paced read that brings history alive on every page. The book will captivate those who prefer their historical nonfiction spiked with real-life tales of murder, power, and intrigue."

Some reviewers have noted that God's Bankers contains inaccuracies, the most serious of which is Posner's allegation in Chapter 11 that Bernardino Nogara, the wartime director of the Vatican's Amministrazione Speciale per la Santa Sede, was a Nazi intelligence agent. This allegation is based on his finding of a man named Nogara named in the interrogation report of Abwehr recruiter Reinhard Reme, which he suggests could only be Bernardino Nogara, who was therefore working for the Nazis throughout World War II. Dr. Marilyn Mallory, a scholar familiar with the pontificates of Popes Pius XI and Pius XII, rebutted Posner in a 2015 article in Inside the Vatican, asserting that the interrogation report, found in the National Archives in London, identifies the man as Bruno Nogara, a Venice school teacher who was arrested by the Allies in April 1945. Faced with this evidence, Posner amended the paperback version of God's Bankers, now stating on page 137 that there were in fact two Abwehr agents named Nogara: Bruno Nogara and Branch Nogara, listed in Appendix C of Reme's interrogation report. Posner argues that it is Bruno Nogara, who is listed as a member of Abwehr Unit 257 under Reichsstatthalter Hubert Pfannenstiel, while Branch Nogara is listed under Abwehr Unit 254, commanded by Reichsstatthalter Ernst Schmidt-Burck. Thus, there were two different Abwehr units under two different commanders, and therefore two different Nogaras.

But The Tablet, a London-based Catholic journal, points out that the source cited by Posner, a copy of which can be read online, clearly identifies Branch Nogara not as a person, but as the small town of Nogara located just north of the River Po, where Abwehr Unit 254 maintained its supply depot. According to The Tablet, there is no second person named Nogara.

Citing disclosures in God's Bankers, Posner wrote an opinion editorial in the Los Angeles Times on February 13, 2015, calling on Pope Francis "to approve the release of the Vatican's Holocaust-era files in its secret archives. They probably contain not only answers to how early the Vatican knew about the Nazis' mass murder of innocents, but also crucially important documents from the Vatican Bank, founded in June 1942." Subsequently, Posner started collecting online signatures in petitions to Pope Francis to release the Vatican Bank's World War II archives and the Vatican's Holocaust documents. Posner said that his goal was to get more than 1,000 signatures to present to Pope Francis when the Pope visited the U.S. in September 2015.

=== PHARMA ===
Posner's history of the American pharmaceutical industry was published by Simon & Schuster imprint Avid Reader Press for March 10, 2020. Kirkus said that the book is "A shocking, rousing condemnation of an industry clearly in need of better policing." Literary Hub selected PHARMA as one of the "most anticipated books of 2020," and in a review, author John Freeman stated: "The cat’s out of the bag on this one, we all know pharma has been a disaster for many Americans, but Gerald Posner specializes in telling you what you don’t know: in his New York Times bestsellers like Case Closed and books like Hitler’s Children or God’s Bankers, what he has perfected is achieving the kind of disgust only a massive research dive can bring.... Posner has created a medical leviathan for our times." Beth Macy, author of Dopesick, says that "I could not put down Gerald Posner’s Pharma, the definitive story of how one family, the Sacklers, set out to get exquisitely rich on the back of unsuspecting Americans—then blamed the so-called 'abusers' instead of their own highly addictive drug."

Natasha Singer in The New York Times Book Review said the book was “A withering and encyclopedic indictment of a drug industry that often seems to prioritize profits over patients…[PHARMA] reads like a pharmaceutical version of cops and robbers." The New York Times Book Review also selected Pharma as one of "11 Editor's Weekly Choices," calling referring to the book as a "major work"

PHARMA included extensive coverage of the opioid epidemic and the Sackler family. In STAT News, Posner listed some of his new findings about the Sackler family. In WIRED, Posner wrote about Marianne Skolek, who became an activist against Purdue Pharma and its narcotic painkiller, OxyContin, after her daughter died of an overdose.

PHARMA was published the day before the World Health Organization declared COVID-19 a pandemic. A week before publication, Posner wrote an opinion piece in The New York Times, "Big Pharma May Pose an Obstacle to Vaccine Development." He called COVID-19 "the ultimate test case for whether drug firms might at last become full partners in a public-private partnership."

Posner's penultimate chapter is titled "The Coming Pandemic". Biochemist Karen Bush told Posner in a 2016 interview that when it comes to the next pandemic, “It is not a question of if, it is a question of when.” The Dallas Morning News wrote that while "Long before coronavirus, Gerald Posner began writing ‘Pharma,’ which warns of ‘The Coming Pandemic.’ In Literary Hub, Posner wrote "On the Near Impossibility of Planning for a Viral Pandemic."

The Society of American Business Editors and Writers selected 'PHARMA' as a finalist for the Best Business Book of 2020

The Florida Book Award selected 'PHARMA' for its Gold Medal award for the Best General Nonfiction Book of 2020.

Posner relied on his reporting from 'PHARMA' to write a series of opinion pieces in national publications about either shortcomings in the drug industry or about the concerns that the Sackler family might not be held accountable for their role in the marketing of Oxycontin in their privately-owned drug company, Purdue Pharma. In the Los Angeles Times he argued for the appointment of an independent examiner in the bankruptcy of Purdue Pharma so that the case would not leave "unanswered the many troubling questions about the full extent of the [Sackler] family’s role in igniting and fanning the opioid epidemic for its own profit." Posner subsequently co-wrote two opinion pieces about the Sacklers in The New York Times. In July 2020, he joined with bankruptcy law professor Ralph Brubaker in a piece titled "The Sacklers Could Get Away With It." Posner wrote "At stake is whether there will ever be a fair assessment of responsibility for America’s deadly prescription drug epidemic." In December, Posner teamed with another bankruptcy law professor, Jonathan C. Lipson, in a New York Times opinion piece titled "The Sacklers’ Last Poison Pill."

Besides the Sacklers and Purdue Pharma, Posner joined Margarida Jorge, the campaign director for Lower Drug Prices Now, in a Newsweek opinion piece that criticized pharmaceutical executives for profiting from rumors and press releases about COVID-19 vaccines and treatments. And in February 2021, Posner wrote in USA Today asking President Biden not to make Janet Woodcock the permanent director of the Food and Drug Administration. Posner wrote that "The Biden administration should avoid rewarding any government official who contributed to the opioid crisis having become the most lethal prescription drug epidemic in American history."

Posner also helped break the story of the role McKinsey & Company had in advising Purdue Pharma how to energize its flagging OxyContin sales.

Tucker Carlson, when interviewing Posner about his reporting that the Sacklers might evade justice for their role in the opioid epidemic, said "Gerald Posner may be the best known and most thorough investigative reporter in this country."

=== Editorial writings ===
Posner supported Al Gore during the 2000 presidential election, and wrote a Wall Street Journal editorial shortly after the 9/11 attacks reversing his opinion of George W. Bush. Later he changed his opinion again; in October 2006, in "An Open Letter to the President", published on The Huffington Post, he reverted to his original position that Bush was a bad president stifled by his stubbornness. He also wrote about investigative issues for The New York Times, The New Yorker, Vanity Fair, Talk, Newsweek, Time, the Miami Herald, and The Daily Telegraph. He was a regular contributor to NBC's Today Show, as well as other national shows on the History Channel, CNN, FOX News, and CBS. He was a frequent guest on MSNBC's Countdown with Keith Olbermann. A member of the National Advisory Board of the National Writers Union, Posner is also a member of the Authors Guild, International PEN, The Committee to Protect Journalists, and Phi Beta Kappa. He worked on all his projects with his wife, Trisha Posner, who is also an author and artist. Posner was the Chief Investigative Reporter for The Daily Beast, until he resigned over plagiarism charges in 2010.

=== Television appearance ===
Posner appears in the 2013 History Channel documentary JFK Assassination: The Definitive Guide.

== Legal career ==
After graduating with honors from the University of California, Hastings College of the Law in 1978, Posner moved from San Francisco to New York and started practicing law as a litigation associate at the New York–Wall Street law firm Cravath, Swaine & Moore. After leaving Cravath in 1981 he was a co-founder of the New York firm, Posner & Ferrara. It was there that he became involved in an ultimately unsuccessful 4-year pro bono effort on behalf of victims of concentration camp experiments against the West German government and the family of Nazi experimenter Josef Mengele. After the publication of his first book about Mengele, Posner was "Of Counsel" to Posner & Ferrara. In 2010 he began a series of high-profile client representations. Among them were three brothers of Afghanistan's then-president Hamid Karzai: Posner represented Mahmud Karzai and Qayum Karzai, as well as the so-called "King of Kandahar", Ahmed Wali Karzai, who was assassinated in July 2011. Posner also represented Haji Ruhullah, an Afghan security contractor described by "The Washington Post" as "a leading warlord in Southern Afghanistan." Posner successfully defended Ruhullah against U.S. Army efforts to debar the Afghan from doing business with the U.S. government. Posner also assisted other high-profile defendants. He advised Dr. Conrad Murray, charged with manslaughter in the death of pop icon Michael Jackson, as part of a British documentary over Murray's role. Posner provided pro-bono advice to Viktor Bout, the Russian arms dealer nicknamed in the press as the "Merchant of Death" (played by actor Nicolas Cage in the film Lord of War). According to Posner, his legal training has given him a "big" edge in his primary career as an investigative reporter and author. Posner is a member of the New York and Washington D.C. Bars and the International Criminal Bar.

In 2015, the Chicago Tribune called Posner "a merciless little pitbull of an investigator."

== Personal life ==
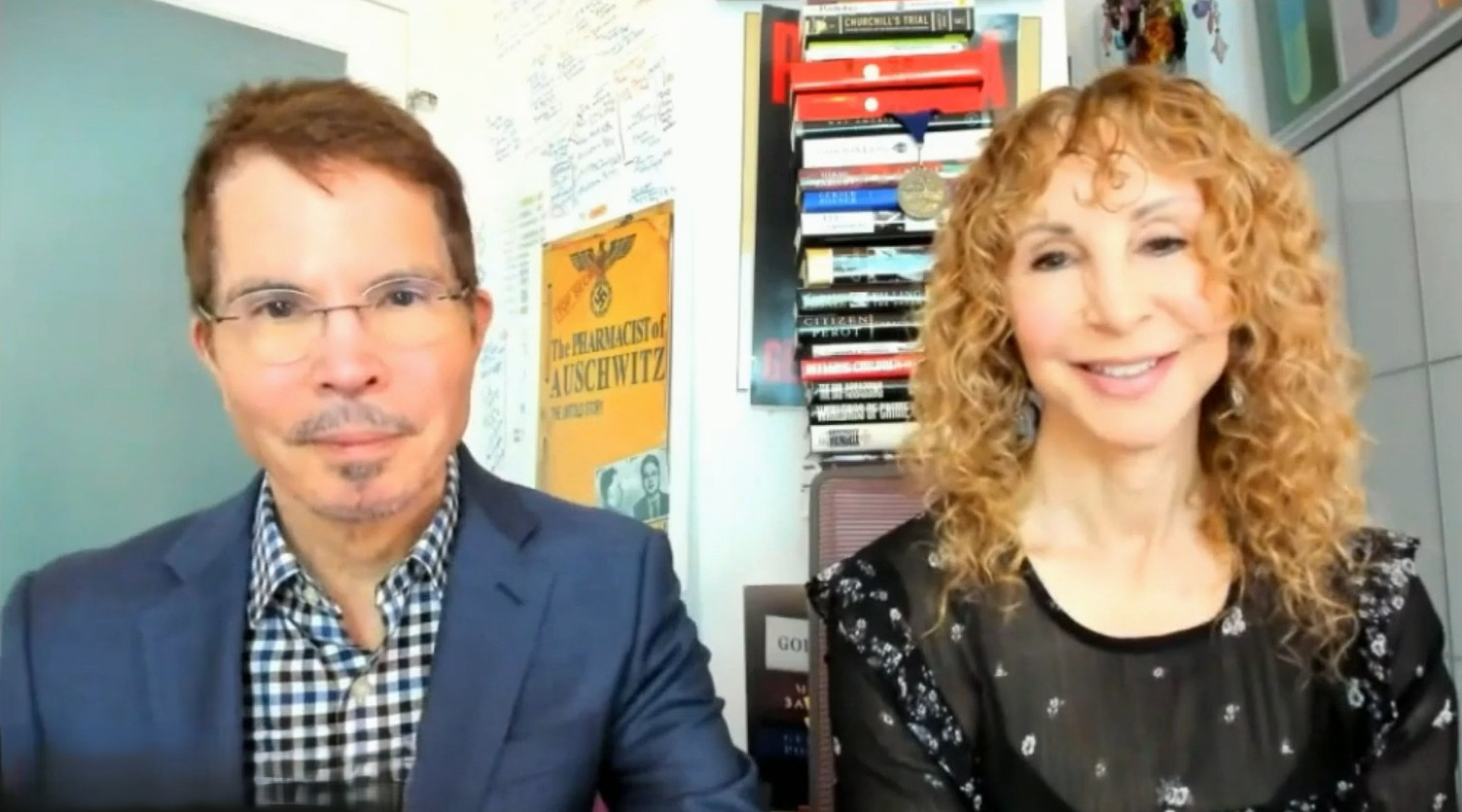
Gerald and Patricia Posner in 2026

Posner is married to author and journalist Trisha Posner.

Posner considers himself a non-practicing Catholic.

== Controversies ==
=== NSA Surveillance of Princess Diana and the Paget Report ===
In 1999, in the premier September issue of Talk Magazine, Posner wrote about the mistakes of French and British investigators in the 1997 death of Diana, Princess of Wales ("Al Fayed's Rage"). According to Posner, "an active U.S. intelligence asset" let him listen to "an innocuous portion of an undated conversation between [Princess] Diana and di Lima (the wife then of the Brazilian ambassador to the United States)." The recording, Posner reported, "was one of several collected by the National Security Agency." According to Posner, "The NSA never directly targeted Diana, but picked up her conversations as an incidental part of a separate monitoring operation." The NSA refused to acknowledge that the surveillance tapes existed but did admit that it had "39 classified documents about Diana totaling 124 pages." News that the NSA might have spied, even inadvertently, on the Princess of Wales, caused a furor in the United Kingdom.

Posner also reported that the driver of the car in which Diana was killed, Henri Paul, had met with his French intelligence handler in the hours before the fatal crash. "In fact, according to an American law enforcement official and an American intelligence agent, Paul spent the last several hours before the crash with a security officer from the DGSE. That may come as news to the French police; in an internal report a French police commandant named Jean Paul Copetti concluded that it was 'not possible' to determine Paul's whereabouts during that time."

In 2006, Scotland Yard released The Operation Paget Inquiry Report Into the Allegation of Conspiracy to Murder: Diana, Princess of Wales and Emad El-Din Mohamed Abdel Moneim Fayed. Operation Paget was the result of a multiyear investigation by the British police into lingering questions about whether the death of Princess Diana might have been the result of foul play. The Paget investigators interviewed Posner. The final report confirmed that driver Henri Paul had in his possession 12,560 French Francs at the time of his death. That was the amount Posner had reported Paul's intelligence handler had given him in cash only a few hours before the fatal accident. According to the British investigators, "The DGSE stated that they did not know Henri Paul. Gerald Posner gave ‘source’ information that they were with Henri Paul on Saturday night. Even if correct, the source stated that the meeting was of a routine nature and not connected to the Princess of Wales’ visit to Paris. She was apparently only discussed in passing."

Operation Paget also reviewed Posner's charges about the NSA in the report's Chapter 15, "Central Intelligence Agency/National Security Agency, USA." As to the portion of a taped conversation Posner heard, the British investigators concluded "The inference from Gerald Posner’s information was that the Embassy, and not the Princess of Wales, was the subject of any telephone interception....Gerald Posner’s sources did not indicate to him that the Princess of Wales herself was under targeted surveillance by the NSA. The importance of such information, had there been any, would not be lost on the sources and it is reasonable to assume that they would have passed on that information to Gerald Posner had they been in possession of it."

The New York Times titled its coverage of Operation Paget as "The Final Word on Diana's Death (Don't Bet on It)". It reported on what Posner heard when the intelligence source had played him a small part of a surveillance tape:

"Lord Stevens said he felt confident that nothing had been withheld from him, and added that even if the intelligence agencies had been eavesdropping on Diana, which they had not been, they would not have heard anything interesting.

For instance, the American investigative writer Gerald Posner says in the report that through a source, he heard an intercept of a telephone call between Diana and Lúcia Flecha de Lima, wife of the Brazilian ambassador at the time. The inference, the report says, was that the embassy, not Diana, was being bugged.

What did he hear? 'I could only decipher a British woman and a woman with a slight Hispanic accent talking about hairstyles,' he said."

=== Plagiarism and quote falsification ===
In 2010, Posner was the chief investigative reporter at The Daily Beast. Following the revelation that a number of Posner's stories for the Beast contained portions plagiarized from articles in other publications, Posner resigned from the Beast. According to Posner, the plagiarism was inadvertent and the result of the "compressed deadlines" of the Beast and confusing his assembled research with his own writing in the "master files" he assembled on each story. Allegations of plagiarism also surfaced concerning his book, Miami Babylon (October 2009). Posner said the Miami Babylon plagiarism occurred because of a new system of "trailing endnotes", because an individual he interviewed read one of the plagiarized sources and reiterated it during the interview, and because he mistook other people's writing for his own after scanning source documents into a computer database. The Miami New Times also found that Posner "seems to add, subtract, or misattribute quotes" and displayed a series of such "apparently altered or misattributed quotes".

Posner subsequently hired attorney Mark Lane, threatening litigation against the Miami New Times on grounds of tortious interference (i.e., that its investigation and reporting of this case damaged Posner's business relationship with his publishers) and emotional distress. Posner's choice of attorney was particularly notable, as Lane was a well-known conspiracy theorist in regards to the death of President John F. Kennedy, while Posner had written his debunking of such theories in his 1993 book, "Case Closed". In a press release, Posner stated "Although I'm convinced Lee Harvey Oswald assassinated President Kennedy, I've always believed that had Mark Lane represented Oswald, he would have won an acquittal. That's why Mark Lane was the obvious choice as my own attorney." Soon thereafter, the Miami New Times published evidence of additional plagiarism from multiple sources in both Secrets of the Kingdom and Why America Slept. According to Poynter Institute senior scholar Roy Peter Clark, "This constitutes plagiarism by any definition I can think of. ... The capturing of someone else's material that is this extensive cannot, in my opinion, have been done accidentally." Evidence was also presented indicating that Posner had repeatedly "scrubbed" elements of the journalism scandal from his Wikipedia page.

=== Harper Lee lawsuit ===
On May 3, 2013, Posner was named in a federal lawsuit brought by author Harper Lee in Manhattan. Lee claimed that Samuel Pinkus, her literary agent's son-in-law, tricked her into signing away her rights to To Kill a Mockingbird, directing the royalties to be paid into a corporation formed by Posner for that purpose.

Before Posner filed an answer, he and one other defendant settled with Lee and were dismissed from the lawsuit. The parties did not disclose the terms of the settlement. Posner told the Miami Herald: "I have always maintained that not a single contention about me in the complaint was accurate. I was simply the wrong person named in the wrong lawsuit." To Law360, he said: "I am gratified the complaint was dismissed. There was never any basis for this lawsuit against me."

== Bibliography ==
- Mengele: The Complete Story (1986)
- Warlords of Crime: Chinese Secret Societies – The New Mafia (1988)
- Bio-Assassins (1989)
- Hitler's Children: Sons and Daughters of Leaders of the Third Reich Talk About Their Fathers and Themselves (1991), ISBN 978-0-394-58299-3
- Case Closed: Lee Harvey Oswald and the Assassination of JFK (1993), ISBN 978-0-679-41825-2
- Citizen Perot: His Life and Times (1996), Random House, ISBN 978-0-614-05801-7
- Killing the Dream: James Earl Ray and the Assassination of Martin Luther King, Jr. (1998), ISBN 978-0-375-50082-4
- Why America Slept: The Failure to Prevent 9/11 (2003), ISBN 978-0-375-50879-0
- Motown: Music, Money, Sex, and Power (Music of the Great Lakes) (2003), Random House, ISBN 978-0-375-50062-6
- Secrets of the Kingdom: The Inside Story of the Saudi-U.S. Connection (2005), ISBN 978-1-4000-6291-1
- Miami Babylon: Crime, Wealth and Power – A Dispatch From the Beach (2009), ISBN 978-1-4165-7656-3
- The Third Man: Was there another bomber in Oklahoma City?(2013),ISBN 978-0-9891-4210-6
- God's Bankers: A History of Money and Power at the Vatican (2015), Simon & Schuster, ISBN 978-1-4165-7657-0
- Pharma: Greed, Lies, and the Poisoning of America (2020), Simon and Schuster, ISBN 978-1-5011-5189-7

== See also ==
- Journalism scandals
