= Monmouth College =

Private college in Monmouth, Illinois, US

- Latin: Collegii Monmouthiensis
- Former name: Monmouth Academy (1853–1856)
- Motto: Lux (Latin)
- Motto in English: Light
- Type: Private liberal arts college
- Established: April 18, 1853; 173 years ago
- Accreditation: HLC
- Religious affiliation: Presbyterian Church (USA)
- Academic affiliations: APCU; Annapolis Group; ACM
- Endowment: $145.4 million (2025)
- President: Patricia Draves
- Academic staff: 75 (full-time equivalent in 2021)
- Students: 767 (autumn 2025)
- Location: Monmouth, Illinois, U.S. 40°54′52″N 90°38′14″W
- Campus: 112 acres (45.32 ha); Small town
- Language: English
- Colors: Red and white
- Nickname: Fighting Scots
- Sporting affiliations: NCAA Division III; MWC; CWPA
- Mascot: Big Red
- Website: monmouthcollege.edu

Monmouth College is a private Christian liberal arts college in Monmouth, Illinois, United States. Affiliated with the Presbyterian Church, it enrolls 767 students in Bachelor of Arts and Bachelor of Science degree programs including a four-year nursing program and four-year electrical engineering and mechanical engineering programs, which became ABET-accredited in 2025.

== History ==
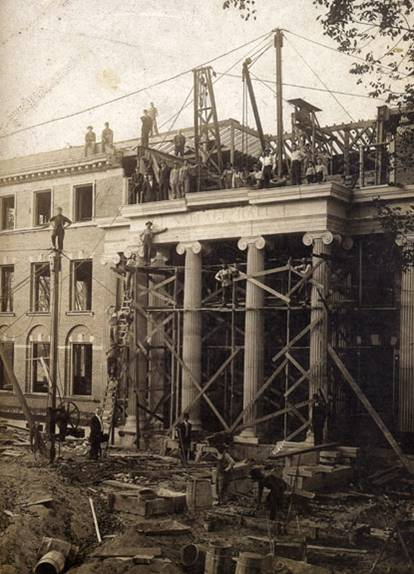
Construction of Wallace Hall, 1908. Its entrance is modeled after the east portico of the ancient Erechtheion of the Athenian Acropolis. The building houses historic classrooms that played a part in educating all living alumni.

Monmouth College was founded on April 18, 1853, by the Second Presbytery of Illinois of the Associate Reformed Presbyterian Church. Founded as Monmouth Academy, the school became Monmouth College after receiving a charter from the state legislature on September 3, 1856. The college remains affiliated with the Presbyterian Church (USA) and is a member of the Associated Colleges of the Midwest, a consortium of small, private liberal arts colleges. The college's motto "Lux" ("Light") appears on its seal.

The first president, David A. Wallace, built two mission churches in Massachusetts before assuming the Monmouth presidency.

Founded on the eve of the American Civil War, the college immediately faced a crisis. The college's campus was still under construction while virtually the entire male student body left for military service. Two hundred and thirty-two students, faculty members, and trustees served in the Civil War. A quarter of them were wounded and one in eight was killed. Two were awarded the Medal of Honor, and Abner C. Harding, a college trustee who raised a regiment composed largely of Monmouth College students, was commissioned a brigadier general for his leadership in the defense of Fort Donelson in 1863. President Wallace, believing that the college "must educate, whether there be peace or war", kept classes in session for what was then a primarily female student body.

Monmouth was founded as a coeducational college where women and men had equal access to courses. When veterans returning to the college decided to form fraternities, a group of women was determined not to be outdone, and in 1867 established the first fraternity for women, known today as Pi Beta Phi. Three years later, another well-known women's fraternity, Kappa Kappa Gamma, was founded at Monmouth.

Monmouth College had gained national stature by 1911 as shown by its US government classification where 59 colleges and universities ranked higher and 244 ranked lower (out of a total of 345 top colleges).

World War II posed a crisis to the institution similar to that of the Civil War, as male students began enlisting in the service within a month of the Japanese attack on Pearl Harbor, and soon only a handful remained on campus. Through an arrangement with the U.S. Navy Department, the college survived by becoming a U.S. Naval Flight Preparatory School, and later offered a V-5 Navy Academic Refresher Unit program for officers. Courses were taught by Monmouth's liberal arts faculty. The Navy later adopted portions of Monmouth's curriculum for training programs nationwide. More than 2,000 Navy men went through Monmouth College, a number of whom would re-enroll at the college after the war funded by the G.I. Bill.

Monmouth's chemistry department gained national prominence in the 1950s when longtime professor William S. Haldeman was recognized with a major award by the American Chemical Society. The Steelman Report on Manpower for Research noted that Monmouth and four other small colleges—Hope, Juniata, St. Olaf and Oberlin—together had "produced more candidates for the doctor's degree in chemistry than Johns Hopkins, Fordham, Columbia, Tulane and Syracuse Universities combined."

Beginning in the 1960s, a secularization movement changed the nature of the college. Concurrent with dwindling financial support from the United Presbyterian Church, the college removed the Church Synod's role in nominating and confirming trustees, thus allowing for the cultivation of new trustees with stronger business acumen and financial resources than those during the college's earlier days. The college otherwise maintained its covenant relationship with the Presbyterian Church.

During the Vietnam War, the military draft (and the ability to avoid the draft by enrolling in college) contributed to increases in college attendance throughout the U.S. Attendance at the college increased but then fell when the draft ended in the 1970s causing financial strain not unlike the losing of students to the Civil War had done in the then distant past.

In 1983, a donation from an alumnus committed $5 million to the endowment and launched a $15 million capital campaign, the largest gift in college history to that point.

During the 1990s, enrollment began a steady increase that would see it more than double over the next two decades, from less than 600 in 1993 to 1,379 in 2009 and then decrease to 753 by 2021. The endowment grew from $23.6 million in 1993 to $87.2 million in 2013 to over $115 million in 2020; $75 million higher than the average for similar colleges. In 2021, the endowment stood at $146 million; $93.6 million more than average Baccalaureate colleges at the time. As of June 30, 2025, the endowment stood at $145.4 million.

Between 2002 and 2013, more than $120 million was invested in new construction and renovations to the campus.

== Affiliations ==
Monmouth is a founding member of the Associated Colleges of the Midwest and a member of the Annapolis Group of independent liberal arts colleges. Monmouth also continues its relationship with the Presbyterian Church (USA), although courses in religion are no longer required, and is a member of the Association of Presbyterian Colleges and Universities, of which a Monmouth College president served as chair in 2011–2012. Chemistry at Monmouth is an approved baccalaureate program by the American Chemical Society. Electrical engineering and mechanical engineering are accredited by ABET. The four-year nursing program is approved and conducted in cooperation with Saint Francis Medical Center College of Nursing.

== Academics and resources ==
The ratio of full-time students to full-time instructional faculty is 10:1. 88% of classes have fewer than 20 students.

Monmouth College offers 40 major fields of study and 17 pre-professional fields of study (with 851 different courses offered) in the sciences, arts, humanities, mathematics, computer sciences, social sciences, foreign languages, classics, and interdisciplinary fields including premedical and pre-engineering studies, and provides an integrated core curriculum. This curriculum includes four signature courses designed to aid students in making connections across disciplines and understanding their education as an integrated whole. The curriculum allows freshman students to take advanced classes, and senior students to take introductory courses. The 4-year graduation rate in 2025 was 65%.

For freshmen, the only course requirement is one of the first-year seminar courses which are limited to 16 to 18 students and shares a common focus on critical analysis and development of written and oral argument. The other 31 courses (usually four are taken per semester) required for graduation can be elected by the student.

The most popular majors are: Business Administration, Exercise Science and Kinesiology, Psychology, and Education. Within five years of graduation, more than 60 percent of Monmouth College alumni attend graduate school or another form of ongoing education.

A survey taken six months after the class of 2023 had graduated showed that 98% of Monmouth graduates were employed (or were in graduate school). As of 2026, the median salary of all graduates six years after graduation was $43,158 and the most popular major, Business Administration, earning $59,469 average.

=== Admission ===
Admissions to Monmouth are classified as "selective". For the Class of 2017 (enrolled fall 2013), Monmouth received 2972 applications and accepted 1914 (64.4%). In 2022, the acceptance rate was 66%.

In 2025, 46% of students were female and 54% were male. Students come from 28 states and 21 countries. 27% were students of color and 1% were international students.

=== Associated Colleges of the Midwest consortium ===
Monmouth is a founding member of the fourteen-member Associated Colleges of the Midwest (ACM) consortium. The colleges share resources and develop and operate common off-campus academic programs. The members of the ACM include colleges in the middle west region of the United States and include Carleton College and Grinnell College among others.

=== Study abroad and off-campus ===
Over seventy off-campus programs are available in over fifty countries and run for as little as ten days or as long as a year but generally last one semester. Programs provided through the Associated Colleges of the Midwest consortium take place usually for one semester at over a dozen locales around the globe and include cultural, scientific, economic, historical and other forms of study and research. These programs include scientific research at Oak Ridge National Laboratory, government interning in Washington, D.C., and cultural activities in Florence, Italy. Monmouth College faculty frequently teach in these programs along with other members of the consortium including Carleton College, Grinnell College, and eleven other colleges. Other programs run exclusively by Monmouth College include a program in Scotland.

=== Fellowships and internships ===
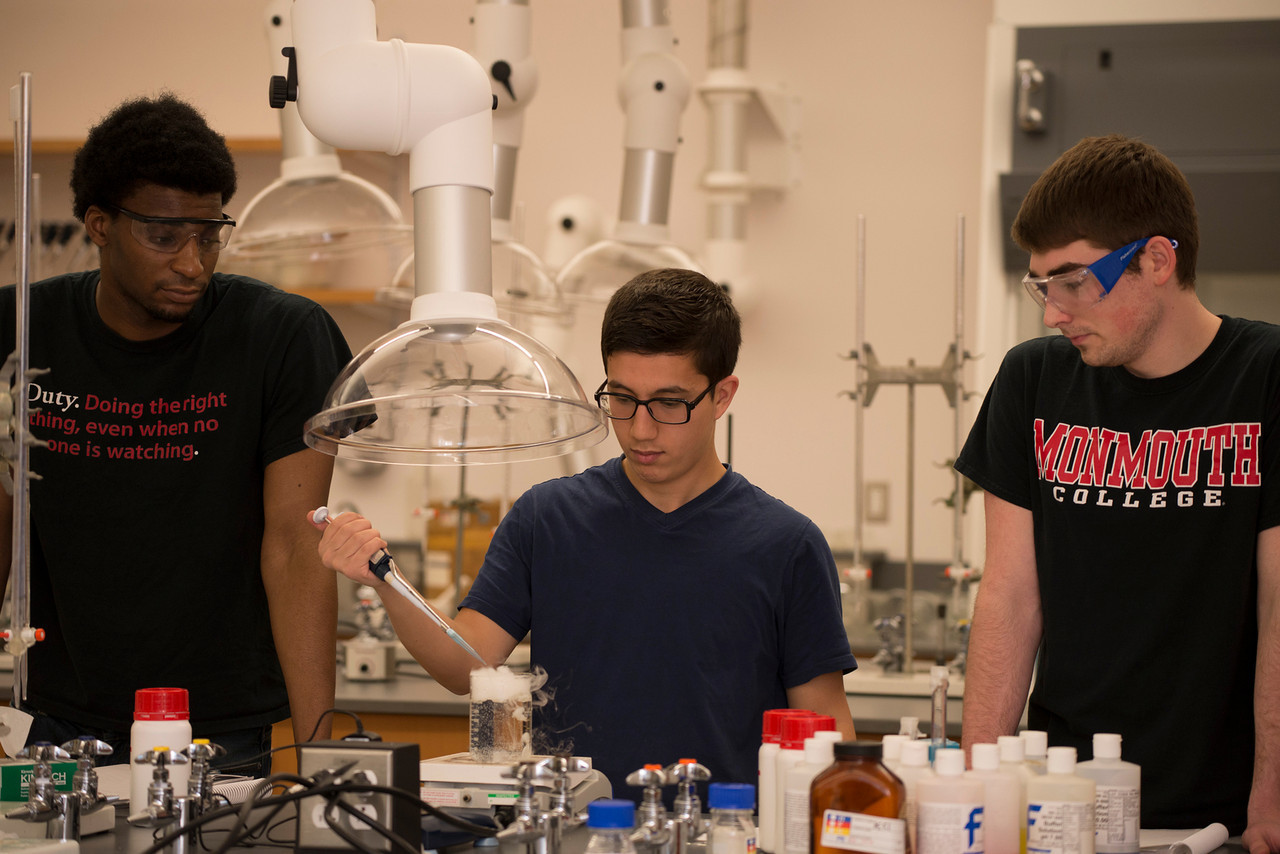
Incoming new students can participate in research projects with their professors and returning upper classmen during the summer prior to their enrollment.

Hundreds of internships are arranged annually for students through the Wackerle Career and Leadership Center. These include public service work around the United States. Students have also interned, beginning as early as the first year, at such businesses as Caterpillar Inc., Deere & Co., Monsanto, law offices, and medical offices. Summer internships are also available in such offices as Admission, Financial Aid, Student Life, Hewes Library, Marketing communication, and fundraising.

Summer research opportunities exist for students and also incoming freshmen and transfers in the sciences and other areas of study. This research is conducted with professors and students working in groups and have included such topics as lightning research, archaeology and music. Included are a stipend and room and board expenses.

== Campus ==
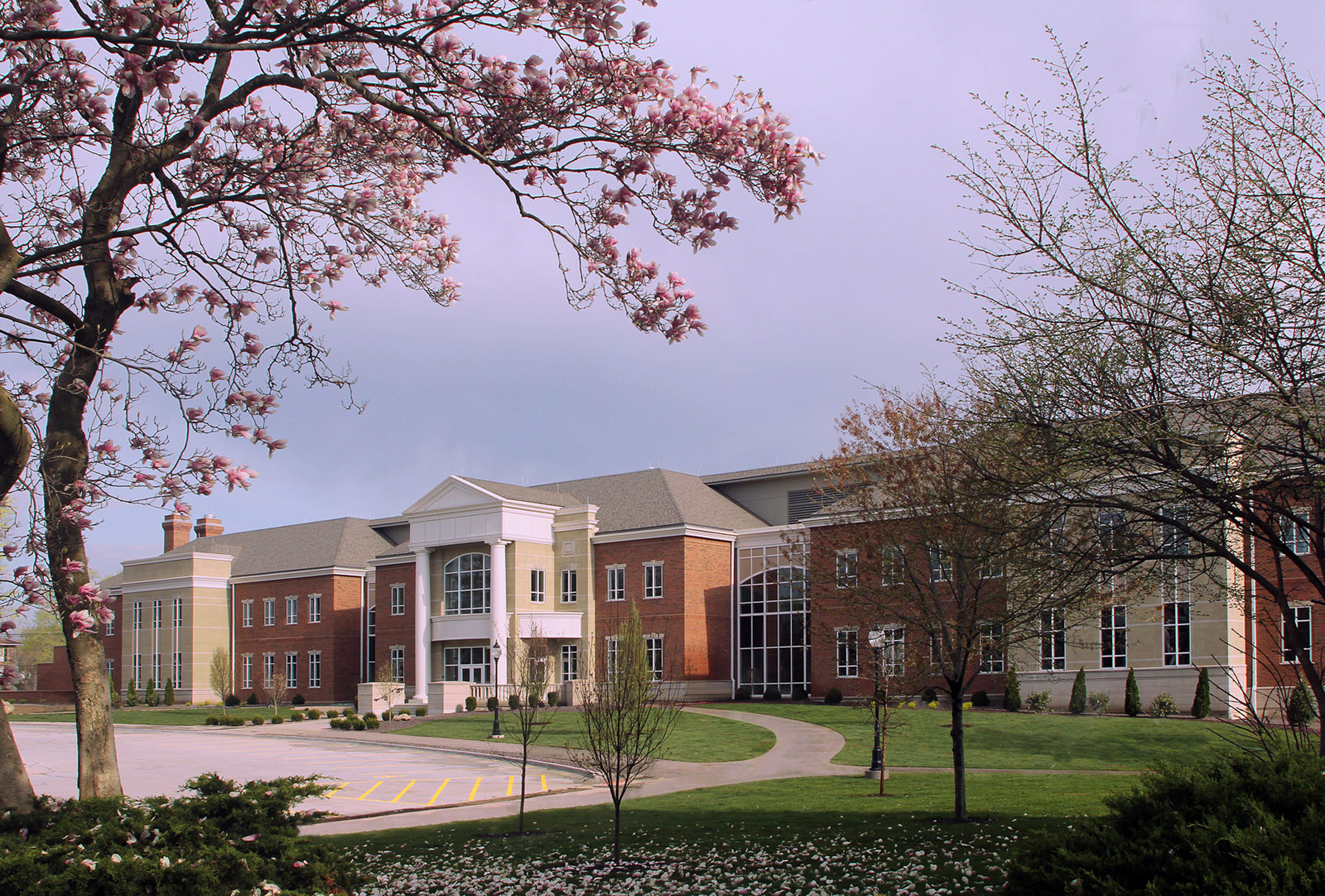
Dedicated in 2013, Monmouth College's Center for Science and Business

Among the resources on the 112-acre (0.45 km^{2}) campus are academic buildings, athletic fields and facilities, three wildlife sanctuaries for the study of ecology, and trails and other areas for hiking. Notable resources include the Shields Collection of antiquities, the largest privately held collection of Native American artifacts in the region, the only direct copy of the Canopus Stone outside of the Cairo Museum, an astronomical observatory, the Mellinger writing center, the Wackerle Career and Leadership center, and sporting facilities. The Kasch Performance Hall provides a traditional setting for musical performances with excellent acoustics and includes a refurbished three-manual pipe organ. The Wells Theater has been upgraded with high tech lighting and sound equipment.

There are ten residence halls and five Greek houses. The campus has been expanded between 2000 and 2007 with three new residence halls, an apartment complex, an athletic complex, tennis complex, baseball, and soccer fields. It reopened the renovated Dahl Chapel and Auditorium containing a 600-seat English Chapel style recital hall/auditorium as well as music rehearsal space in 2003. In 2008, the April Zorn Memorial Stadium was completed, enlarging the seating capacity for football, lacrosse and track events to 2,600 and adding a new press box.

The largest building on campus is the 154,000-square-foot (14,300 m^{2}) Huff Athletic Center. It encompasses the college's existing Glennie Gymnasium and includes a field house with indoor tennis courts and track, natatorium, fitness complex, wellness suite, locker and training rooms, classrooms and offices.

Opened in 2013 is the $42 million, 138,000-square-foot (12,800 m^{2}) Center for Science and Business, which houses the departments of accounting, biology, chemistry, economics, mathematics & computer science, physics, psychology and political economy & commerce. The facility introduces a cadaver lab, the Adolphson Observatory with research-grade 20-inch reflecting telescope, nuclear physics lab, two parallel computing facilities, a moot boardroom, tax preparation facilities, one-way observation labs, and an FDA-approved nutrition lab in addition to other laboratories.

The college maintains a digital television studio and media (computer) lab, a web-based radio station, digital classrooms, and three art galleries. The college also maintains the LeSuer Nature Preserve, a 16.5-acre (6.7 ha) nature preserve, the Hamilton Research Pond, a prairie grass laboratory and a riparian property on the banks of the Mississippi river for the purposes of wetland biological research.

The Ivory Quinby House, built by a founder of Monmouth College, is now the home of the President of the college and is listed on the National Register of Historic Places. Students attend functions at the home, including dinners and discussion groups.

=== Hewes Library ===
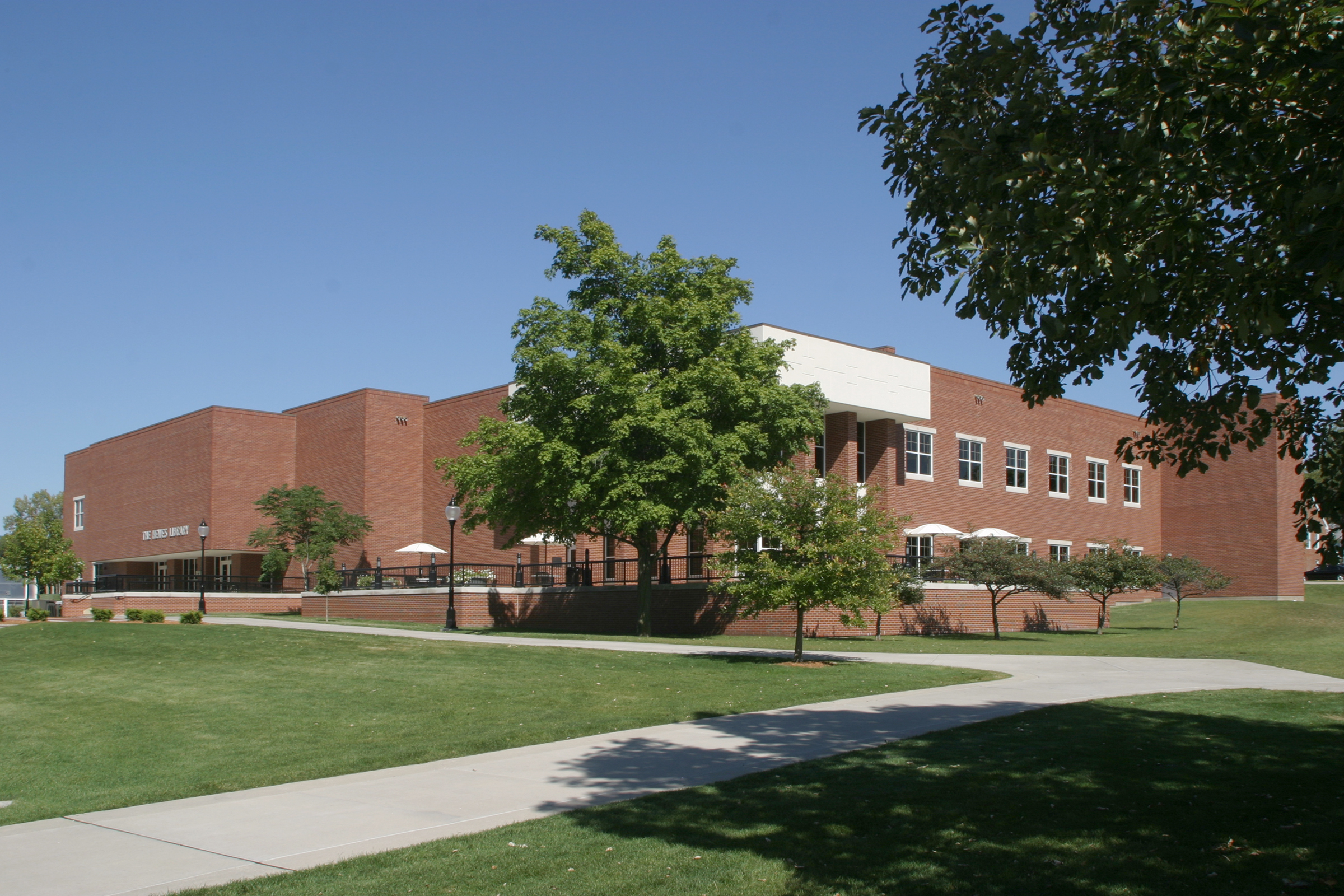
Housing about a half million items, the Hewes Library also contains ancient antiquities and thousands of Native American artifacts.

With over a half-million items catalogued, the Hewes Library houses collections of antiquities, rare books, art, and archaeology. It also provides computer laboratories and tech support. A major remodeling in 2000 resulted in a modern open-stack facility.

=== Sustainability ===
Monmouth College has reduced its energy consumption and has increased its recycling contributions in recent years. These efforts include energy reduction through the installation of new heating boilers throughout campus, the use of energy-efficient lighting, low-flow water systems and the replacement of windows in nearly all older buildings. The Center for Science and Business includes energy efficient heating/cooling systems and heat recapture exhaust systems among other features. Recycling efforts extend into every student residence and office building. Some students have also committed themselves to sustainability of food production by opting to live in the college's Garden theme housing which grows its own organic food and harvests its own honey using college facilities including seven acres set aside for such use. The college provides scholarships for students who have demonstrated leadership in sustainability prior to enrolling.

The college provides free access to bicycles for student use, and an electric vehicle recharging station is located on campus.

== Student life ==
Full-time students make up 100% of students. Students represent about 28 states and about nine countries. Ninety-three percent of students live on campus in dormitories, theme houses, Greek housing, or apartment buildings.

There are about 97 student groups funded by the student government or the college, including cultural, religious, publications, professional, honors, fine and performing arts, political advocacy, service groups, housing, and athletic organizations.

=== Traditions ===
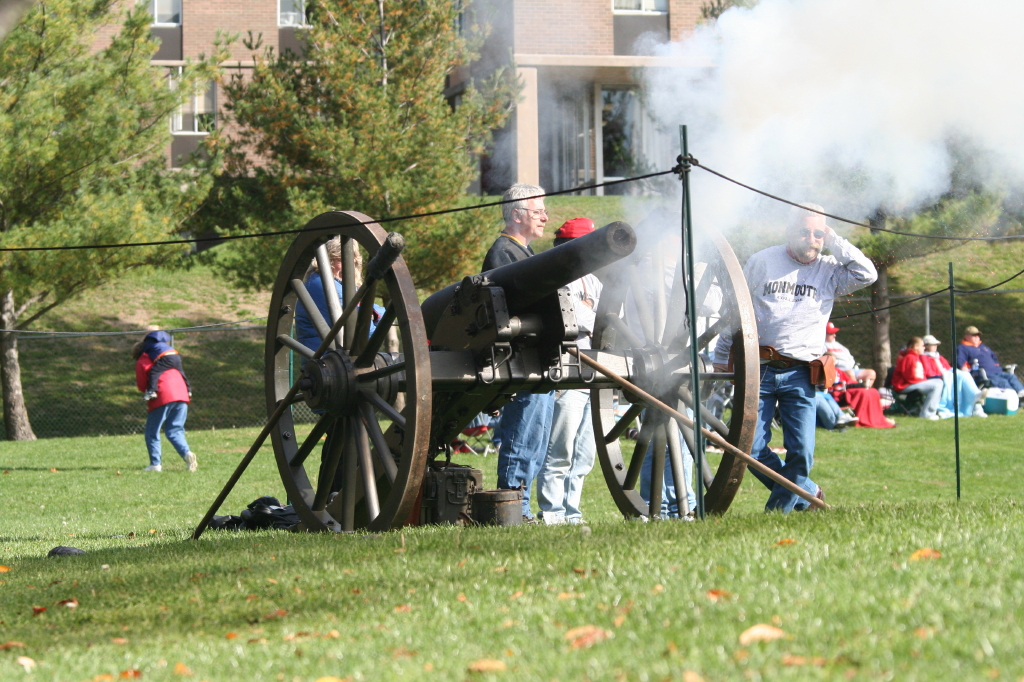
Procured by the senior class of 1903 as its graduation gift to the institution, this Civil War-era cannon spent 50 years at the bottom of a creek after having been stolen by the rival junior class

The college's Scottish heritage is reflected in its bagpipes and drums band that have won national titles.

The freshmen walkout is an autumn event that acquaints new students with the town.

Scholars' day held in conjunction with founders' day celebrates academic achievements with a variety of events. The college also cancels classes for a day and holds an honors convocation.

The college owns a restored civil war cannon (technically called an artillery rifle). It was once used to signal touchdowns the Fighting Scots made at homecoming football games.

=== Safety ===
The college is located in a residential neighborhood. The college provides security patrols, an emergency broadcasting system and emergency text messaging system, plus extensive security lighting and the use of security cameras.

== Athletics ==
Monmouth athletics logo

Monmouth College is a member of the Midwest Conference and the NCAA Division III. The college offers nine varsity sports for men and nine for women. The college also offers intramural sports.

The athletic teams' nickname, Fighting Scots, was coined in 1928 to reflect the Scotch-Irish heritage of the college's founders. "Fighting Scots" is a registered trademark of Monmouth College.

Men's sports	Women's sports
Baseball	Basketball
Basketball	Cross country
Cross country	Golf
Football	Soccer
Golf	Softball
Soccer	Swimming
Swimming	Tennis
Tennis	Track and field
Track and field	Volleyball

The Monmouth College men's track and field team placed third in the NCAA Division III Outdoor Track and Field Championships on May 26, 2007. It was the first national team trophy that a Monmouth College sports team has won. The following year, the men's track and field team took second place in the NCAA Division III Indoor Track and Field Championships. Monmouth's track program has produced nine individual national champions, the most recent of which was James Wilson, who won the NCAA Division III indoor long jump national title in 2013.

In 2014, the college's sports teams and student-athletes won awards for academic achievement including national academic honors from seven different organizations. Volleyball and Men's Golf earned team academic accolades from their respective national coaches' organizations for their high team GPA. Eleven team members also earned individual national honors for their academic excellence including one student who became Monmouth's first winner of the NCAA's Elite 89 Award, given to the student-athlete with the highest GPA participating in one of the NCAA's 89 sponsored championships. Four softball players, three track student-athletes, two women's golfers and a men's tennis player also received national academic honors for the 2013–14 academic year.

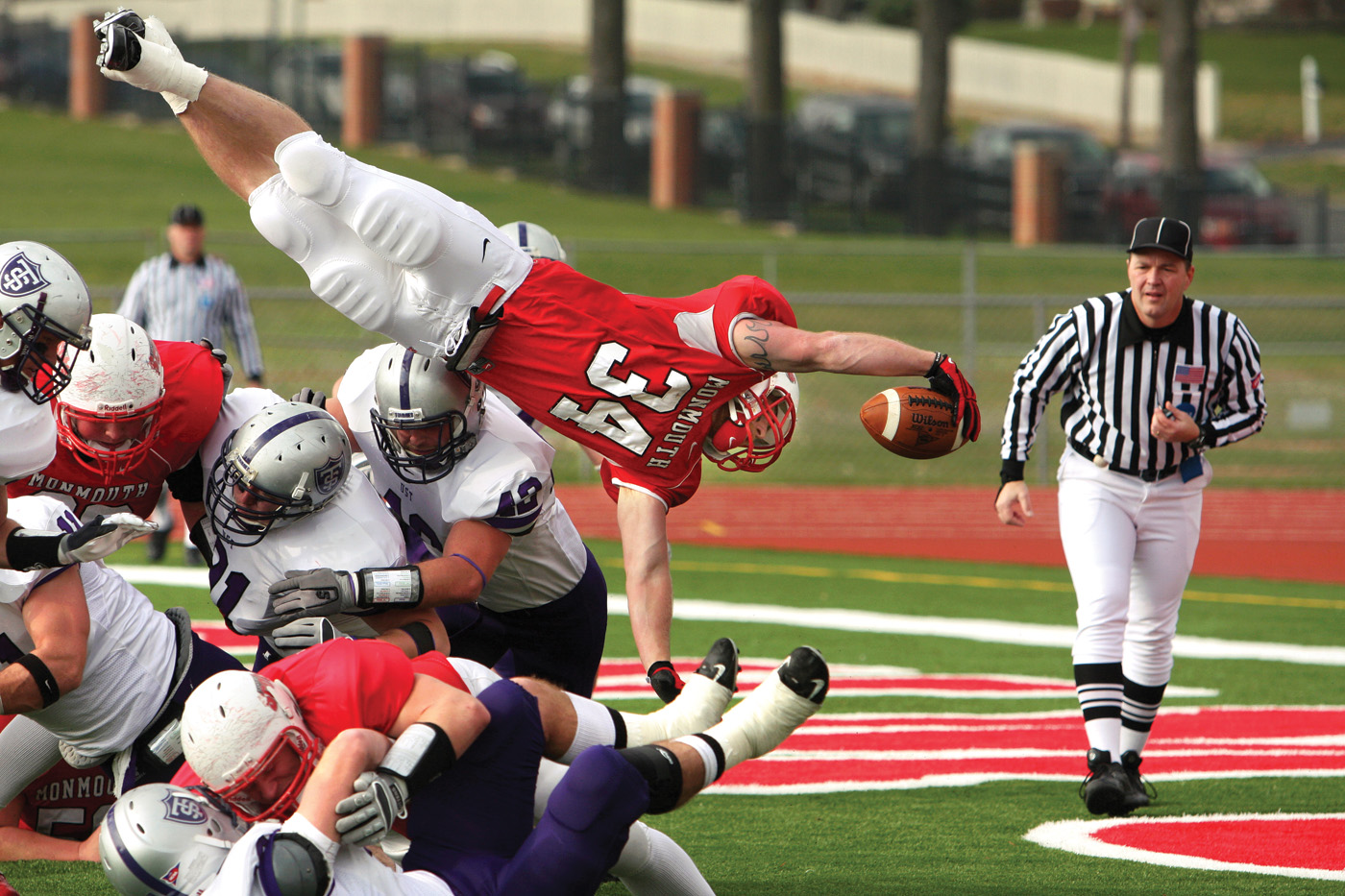
Monmouth (in red jersey) football game in 2009 vs. St. Thomas Tommies

Monmouth began its college football rivalry with Knox College in Galesburg, Illinois in 1888, making it the sixth-oldest college football rivalry in the country. The two schools play annually for the Bronze Turkey trophy in November (originally on Thanksgiving). ESPN's Jeff Merron has classified the trophy as the fifth-most-unusual in college football. The Bronze Turkey has been stolen several times and was at one time buried under the old MC indoor track for five years. Monmouth leads the series with 71 wins, 50 losses and 10 ties.

The Monmouth College football team has appeared in the NCAA Division III Playoffs in 2005, 2008, 2009, 2011, 2016, 2017, 2019, and 2025. Monmouth's recent varsity football alumni include two former quarterbacks who went on to the National Football League. Through 2013, Alex Tanney '11 has played for Kansas City, Dallas, Cleveland, Tampa, and the New York Giants. Mitch Tanney '06 is director of analytics for the Chicago Bears.

The men's water polo team won the CWPA Division III Club National Championship in 2012.

Monmouth College was a member of the Illinois Intercollegiate Athletic Conference from 1921 to 1937.

=== Club and intramural athletics ===
Monmouth College fields over twenty club athletic teams for men and women spanning about a dozen indoor and outdoor sports. These include sand volleyball, ultimate frisbee, badminton, floor hockey, wrestling and table tennis in addition to the more traditional flag football, basketball, and softball. Some teams are co-educational.

== Music ==
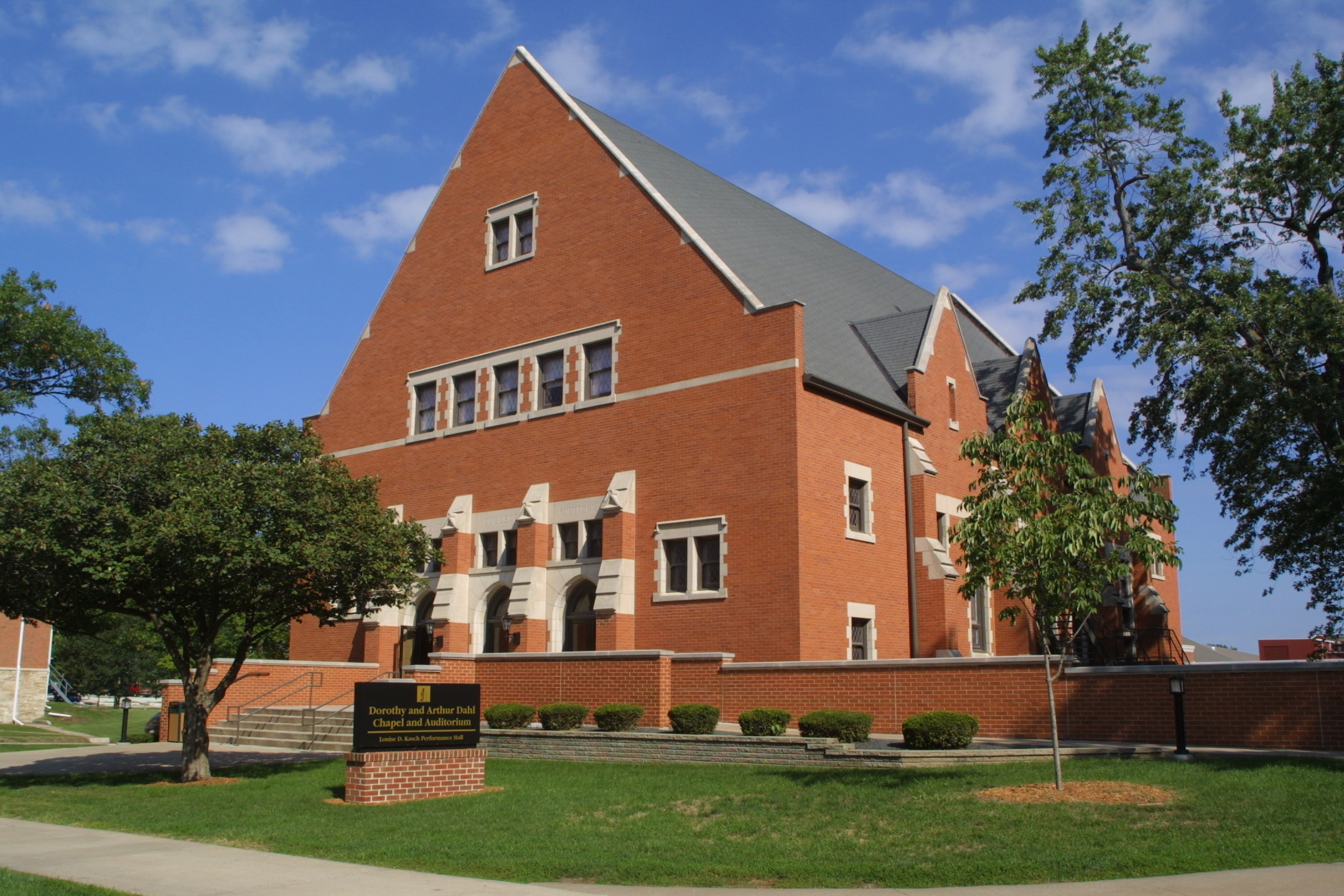
The Dahl Chapel and Auditorium is the oldest academic building on the Monmouth College campus. It was built in 1896 and renovated in 2003

In the Monmouth College music department, majors and non-majors perform in ensembles including chorales, male and female a capella, marching band, concert bands, and an orchestra. The college also has a gospel choir and provides opportunities for musical theatre. The chorale has toured nationally, visiting nearly half the states in the US, and internationally, including trips to Scotland. The group has performed in Carnegie Hall in New York City. The music department subsidizes some vocal ensembles.

All classes, ensembles, and lessons are taught by members of the faculty who are also active performers.

The Kasch Performance Hall, a 600-seat concert hall and stage which is inside the Dahl Chapel, received a $3 million restoration in 2003. Faculty offices, most lessons and classes, practice rooms, and a piano lab are located in Austin Hall, which is two blocks away.

== Rankings ==
In 2024, US News ranked Monmouth College as 129th among National Liberal Arts Colleges and 34th in Top Performers on Social Mobility. The college received an "A" from Forbes in 2023 for financial strength putting it in the top 20% of colleges and universities nationwide.

== Notable alumni ==
=== Artists and collectors ===
- Elizabeth Gowdy Baker 1881, first artist to successfully paint life-size portraits in watercolors
- Ralph Waddell Douglass 1920, award-winning artist; author, Calligraphic Lettering style; coauthor & illustrator, Mesaland Series of children's books
- Jorge Guillermo 1968, royal spouse to Princess Christina of the Netherlands and brother-in-law to Queen Beatrix; noted art collector
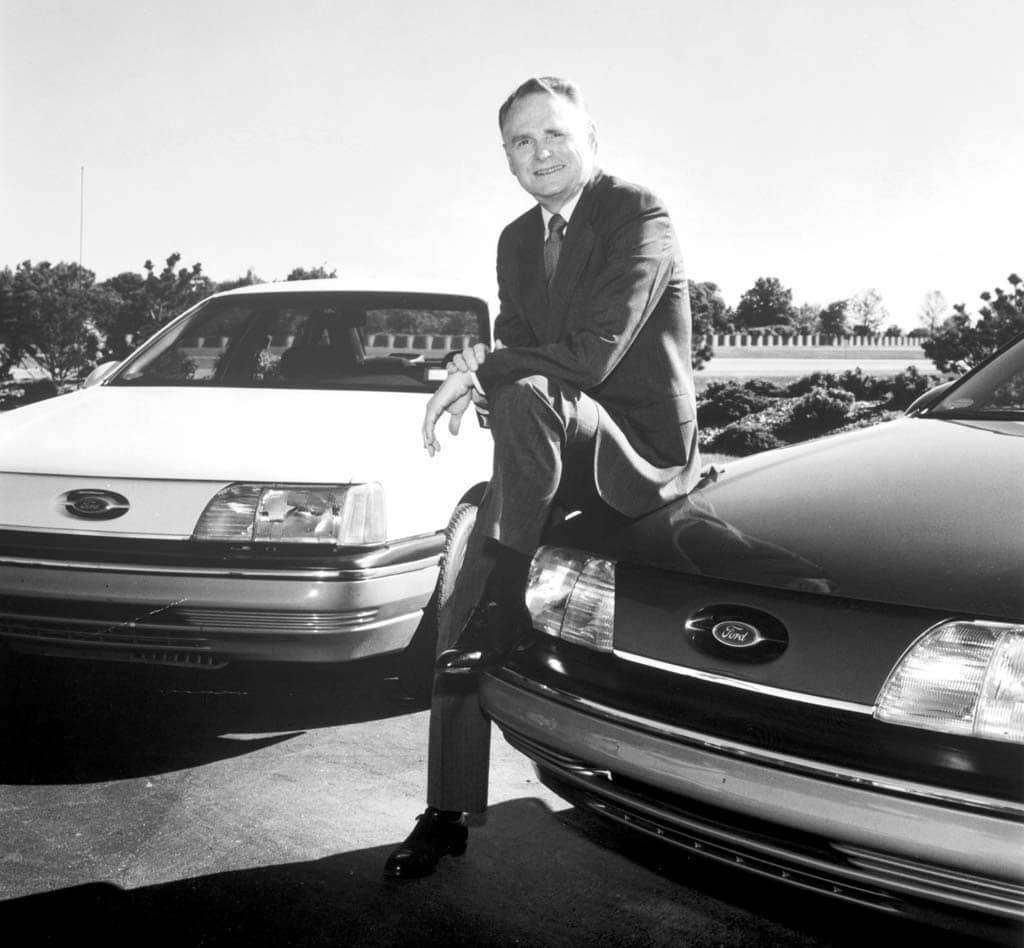
  Harold Arthur Poling in 1986, chairman and CEO of Ford Motor Company.
- Edgar Everett Martin 1921, cartoonist, Boots and Her Buddies, reached an audience of 700 newspapers and 60 million readers

=== Business leaders and economists ===
- Calvin Bryce Hoover 1922, founder of the field of comparative economic systems; noted economist and professor, Duke University; author, The Economic Life of Soviet Russia in 1931
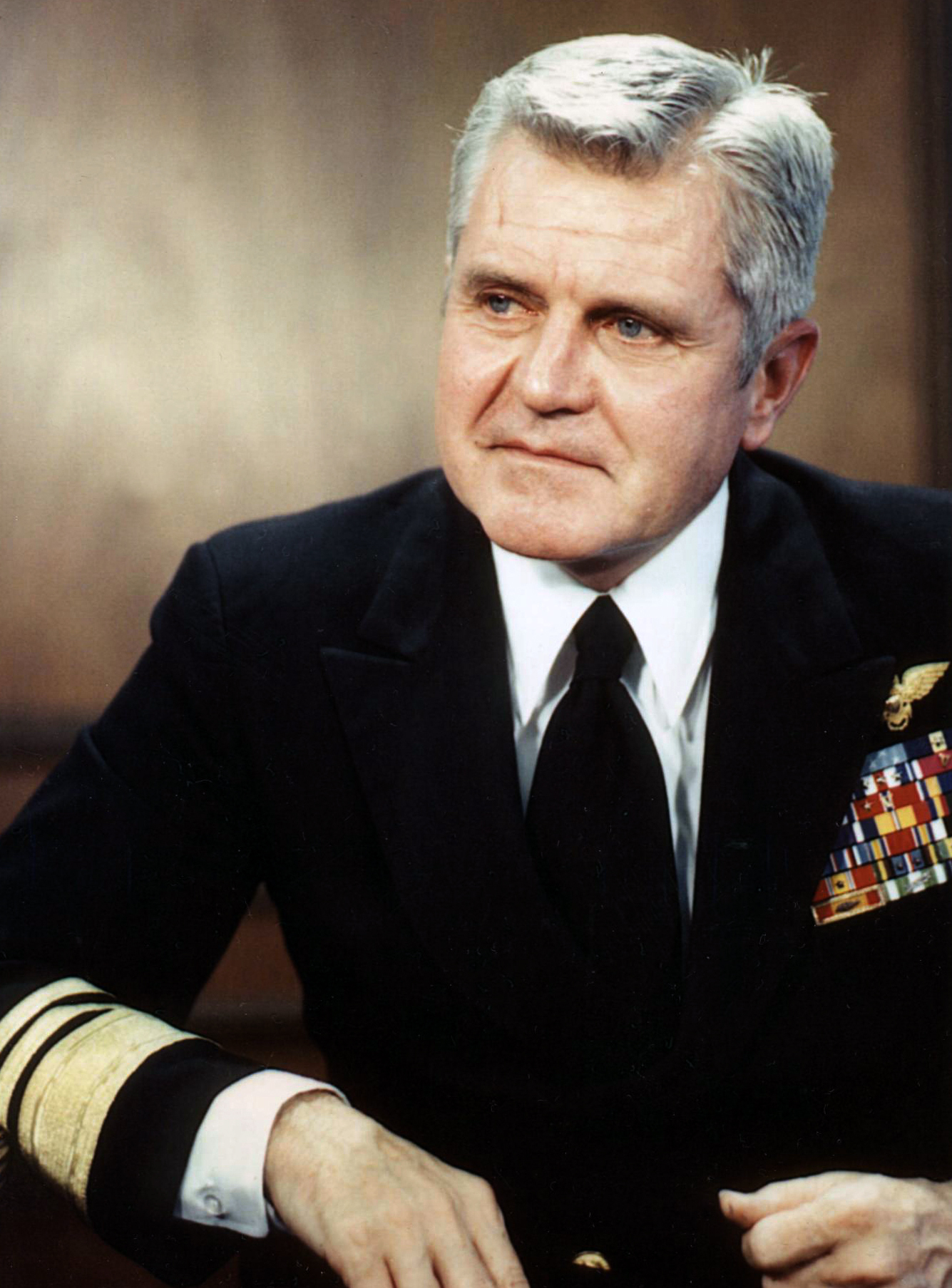
- Vice Admiral James B. Stockdale, while President of the U.S. Naval War College. U.S. Navy, in 1979
  James L. Pate 1963, chairman, chief executive, Pennzoil-Quaker State Co.; Assist. Secr. of Commerce, spokesman, U.S. President Gerald Ford; chairman, Devon Energy Corp.; chief economist, B.F. Goodrich Corporation
- Harold "Red" Poling 1949, chairman, chief executive officer, Ford Motor Company
- Theodore P. Shonts 1876, American lawyer; industrialist; chairman, Panama Canal Commission; railroad president

=== College presidents and deans ===
- Charles C. McCracken 1908, president, University of Connecticut (1930–1935); Ph.D., Harvard University
- Thomas H. McMichael 1886, M.A. 1889, president, Monmouth College (1903–1936); moderator, Presbyterian Church of N. America (1915)
- Maurice H. Rees 1904, medical educator, Dean, U. of Colorado School of Medicine, 1925 to 1945
- James Stockdale 1946, vice admiral, U.S. Navy; U. S. Vice-Presidential candidate; Medal of Honor; president, Naval War College
- Charles F. Wishart 1894, president, College of Wooster 1921–1944; moderator, Presbyterian General Assembly 1924

=== Engineers and architects ===
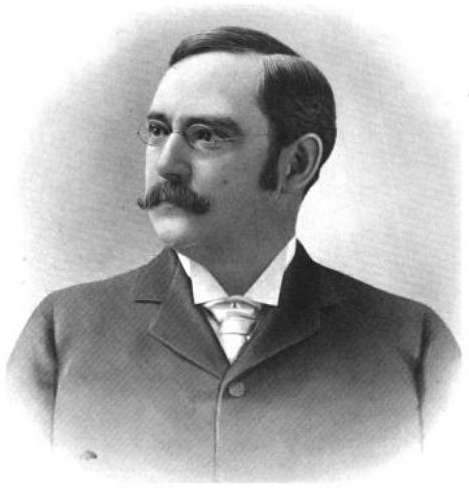
John Findley Wallace, chief engineer of the Panama Canal, in 1902

- Dan Everett Waid 1887, chief architect, Metropolitan Life Insurance Co. of New York; president, New York State Board of Examiners and Registration of Architects (1915–1923); president, American Institute of Architects (1924–1926); Fellow, American Institute of Architects
- John Findley Wallace 1872, chief engineer, Panama Canal project and the Illinois Central Railroad

=== Journalists and writers ===
- Fletcher S. Basset 1869, author; founder of the Chicago Folk-Lore Society; American naval officer
- Dean E. Fischer 1958, Assistant Secretary of State, Public Affairs; spokesman, U.S. State Department; journalist, Time magazine
- Roger J. Fritz 1950, management consultant, columnist, international speaker, author of 63 management development and motivational books; 17th president of Willamette University, Oregon, 1969–1972
- Jane Kurtz 1973, author of over 40 children's books; Golden Kite Award (best picture book text); Year's Best Children's Books award (The Washington Post)
- Chad Simpson 1998, Micro Award, short and flash fiction author; Teresa A. White Award, Quiddity International Literary Journal.
- Melissa Scholes Young 1997, noted writer; author; professor of literature

=== Judges including state supreme courts justices ===
- John F. Main 1885, justice, Washington Supreme Court 1912–1942
- Robert William Porter 1949, United States chief federal judge; attorney; mayor, Richardson, Texas
- Silas Wright Porter 1879, justice, Kansas Supreme Court (1905–1923); chairman, Republican State Convention
- Lyman B. Sutter 1928, mayor, Long Beach, California; municipal court judge

=== Military including Medal of Honor recipients ===
- Reid K. Beveridge 1964, Brig. Gen. (ret.), National Guard, U.S.; functionary, Presbyterian Church; journalist
- James K. L. Duncan 1866, Medal of Honor recipient, physician
- Robert Hugo Dunlap 1942, major in the United States Marine Corps, Medal of Honor recipient
- Stephan T. Johnson 1972, Major general, United States Marine Corps
- Philip G. Killey 1963, United States Air Force Major General; Adjutant General, South Dakota National Guard; director, Air National Guard; Commander, First Air Force
- George H. Palmer 1861, US Army Medal of Honor recipient

=== National political leaders ===
- Mohd Nasir Hashim 1969, member, Selangor State Assembly, Kota Damansara, Malaysia; president, Socialist Party of Malaysia
- William Medcalf Kinsey 1869, U.S. Representative from Missouri; circuit court judge; attorney
- Robert Thaddeus McLoskey 1928, U.S. Representative from Illinois; member, Illinois House of Representatives
- Ilo Browne Wallace 1911, Second Lady of the United States; co-founder, Pioneer Hi-Bred International; sponsor, USS Iowa (BB-61)

=== Philosophers and clergy ===
- Ann Garry 1965, founding director, Center for the Study of Genders and Sexualities; chair of the Department of Philosophy, California State University, Los Angeles; Humphrey Chair of Feminist Philosophy, University of Waterloo; Fulbright lecturer, University of Tokyo and Eötvös Loránd University, Budapest
- Robert H. Meneilly 1945, founding pastor, 7000-member Village Presbyterian Church; author
- Samuel M. Thompson 1924, philosopher, author of three bestselling textbooks of Philosophy; co-author, Confession of 1967, a major statement of faith of the Presbyterian Church (USA)
- William J. Winslade 1963, author, research principal of philosophy, medicine, and ethics; professor, philosophy of medicine, University of Texas

=== Playwrights and actors ===
- Lon Helton, 1972, host of Country Countdown USA; National Weekly Personality of the Year, Country Music Association; inductee of Country Radio Hall of Fame 2006 and Radio Hall of Fame 2022; Country Radio Broadcasters President's Award 2026.
- Jim Verraros 2004, dance musician; actor
- Helen Wagner 1938, actress, star of As the World Turns; 2004 Lifetime Achievement award, Academy of Television Arts and Sciences
- William Young 1863, playwright, writer, actor, known for his play adaptation of the novel Ben-Hur

=== Professional sports ===
- Francis Louis "Jug" Earp 1921, N. F. L. player, Green Bay Packers; inductee, Green Bay Packers Hall of Fame; player, N. Y. Yankees football
- Keith Frank Molesworth 1928, Chicago Bears football player; backfield coach, Pittsburgh Steelers; head coach, Baltimore Colts; vice president and director of personnel, Baltimore Colts
- Jack Ozburn 1933, player, National Basketball League, a precursor to the modern National Basketball Association
- Joe Tait 1959, longtime radio voice, Cleveland Cavaliers
- Alex Tanney 2011, N. F. L. quarterback; assistant coach, Philadelphia Eagles

=== Reformers and activists ===
- Mary G. Charlton Edholm 1876, noted reformer, journalist, editor
- Martha Lena Morrow Lewis 1892, national lecturer, Women's Christian Temperance Union; organizer, women's suffrage; first woman member, National Executive Committee, Socialist Party of America
- Robert Wilson McClaughry 1860, warden, United States Penitentiary, Leavenworth, Kansas; early leader in modern penal reform; General Superintendent of Police, City of Chicago
- Rachel J. Nicol 1868, co-founder, Pi Beta Phi, first secret collegiate society for women patterned after men's fraternities; physician (M.D.)
- Danielle Nierenberg 1995, activist; author; journalist; co-founder/president, Food Tank: The Food Think Tank
- Harriet Shetler 1938, co-founder, (American) National Alliance on Mental Illness; editor
- Dorothy Vellenga 1959, Peace Corps volunteer; sociologist; author
- John M. Work 1891, founding member, executive secretary, Socialist Party of America; author.

=== Scientists ===
- Karen Bush 1965, award-winning American biochemist; editor of peer-reviewed scientific journal
- Kennedy J. Reed 1967, theoretical physicist, Lawrence Livermore Nat. Lab.; founder, Nat. Physical Science Consortium (NPSC); Presidential Award, Excellence in Science, Math. and Engineering Mentoring; fellow, American Physical Society; fellow, American Assn. for the Advancement of Science;
- David Turnbull 1936, chemist, major contributor to solidification theory and glass formation; elected to National Academy of Sciences; fellow, American Academy of Arts and Sciences, awarded the Japan Prize and the Franklin Medal

=== State governors, lieutenant governors, senators and representatives ===
- Robert Hendricks Brink 1968, representative, Virginia House of Delegates; attorney
- Alfred L. Buchan 1869, member, Wisconsin State Assembly; physician
- Clarence F. Buck 1892, senator, Illinois State Senate; newspaper editor
- Herschel L. Carnahan 1901, 30th Lieutenant Governor of California; attorney
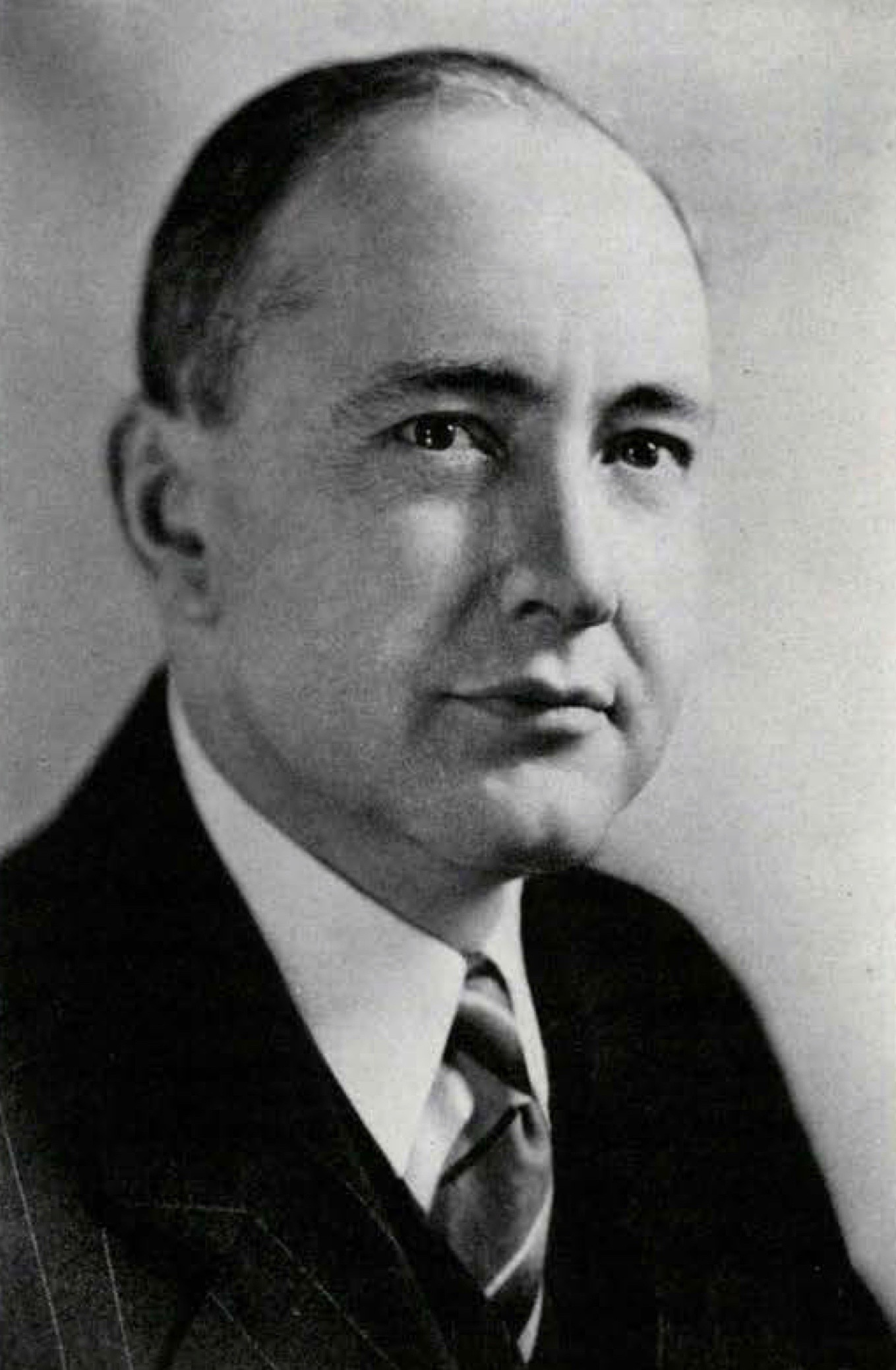
- Charles A. Sprague, Governor of Oregon in 1940
  James R. Carpenter 1889, Wyoming state senator; inventor
- Sarah Bond Hanley 1887, Illinois State Representative; one of the first two women in the Illinois State Assembly; delegate to the Democratic National Convention 1924; a founding member of Democratic Women's Club in the U.S.
- Robert S. Hamilton 1892, Illinois State Senator, attorney
- Mattie Hunter 1976, senator, Illinois State Senate; Senate Majority Caucus Whip
- James Montgomery Rice 1864, American army colonel; lawyer; member, Illinois House of Representatives; contributed to the founding of the U. S. National Guard
- James H. Rupp 1940, Illinois state senator; mayor, Decatur, Illinois, and businessman
- Richard Elihu Sloan 1877, Governor, Arizona Territory; assoc. justice, Arizona Territorial Supreme Court; judge, U. S. District Court
- Charles A. Sprague 1910, Governor, Oregon (1939–1943); editor, publisher, Oregon Statesman
- Earl W. Vincent 1909, Republican U.S. Representative, Iowa 9th congressional district; federal judge; fifth judicial district of Iowa judge
- Jonathan C. Wright 1987, judge, Ill. Circuit Court; member, Ill. House of Rep.; Logan County States Attorney

There are about 12,600 living alumni.

== See also ==
- Associated Colleges of the Midwest
- List of Astronomical Observatories
- List of Concert Halls (in Illinois)
- List of Undergraduate Research Journals
