= G. Herbert Smith =

American educator

16th President of Willamette University
- In office 1942–1969
- Preceded by: Carl Sumner Knopf
- Succeeded by: Roger J. Fritz

Personal details
- Profession: dean professor

George Herbert Smith was an American educator. He was the 16th and longest serving president of Willamette University in Salem, Oregon, from 1942 to 1969. Smith graduated from DePauw University in 1927 where he was a member of Beta Theta Pi fraternity. Smith served as General Secretary of Beta Theta Pi from 1935 to 1946 and President of that organization from 1946 to 1951. Smith is also the original author of The Son of the Stars, the Beta Theta Pi pledge manual.

During Smith's tenure as president of Willamette University, he was instrumental in bringing international fraternities and sororities to that campus where only local organizations had previously existed. In 1947, he assisted in the installation of Beta Theta Pi, Phi Delta Theta, and Sigma Chi at Willamette University, the first time the Miami Triad had ever been installed on the same campus at the same time. This was also during Smith's second year as president of the General Fraternity of Beta Theta Pi.

Smith served as National President of Omicron Delta Kappa from 1961 to 1964. He received ODK's Meritorious Service Award in 1964 and its Distinguished Service Key in 1966.

The G. Herbert Smith Auditorium and Fine Arts Center on Willamette's campus is named after Smith.

Academic offices
| Preceded by Carl Sumner Knopf | President of Willamette University; 1942–1969 | Succeeded by Roger J. Fritz |
