= Adolphson Observatory =

Astronomical observatory in Illinois, U.S.

Adolphson Astronomical Observatory
- Named after: David and Priscilla Adolphson
- Organization: Monmouth College
- Location: Monmouth, Illinois, U.S.
- Coordinates: 40°54′46″N 90°38′21″W
- Altitude: 810 ft (250 m)
- Weather: https://www.cleardarksky.com/c/AdphsnObILkey.html?1%7C
- Established: 2013

Telescopes
- Trubeck Telescope: 20-inch (0.51 m) Corrected Dall-Kirkham Astrograph reflector telescope with CCD camera and adaptive optics

The Adolphson Astronomical Observatory, located atop the Center for Science and Business in Monmouth, Illinois, U.S., on the campus of Monmouth College, was built in 2013. Its largest telescope is the 20-inch reflecting Trubeck Telescope. The observatory is used for undergraduate student education, undergraduate research including the tracking and discovery of near-earth objects, and for public awareness of science.

== History ==
The observatory was established in 2013 by a gift from David Adolphson, a retired business executive, and his wife Priscilla Trubeck Adolphson, both graduates of Monmouth College. It provides upgraded accommodations for astronomical observation to students and faculty of Monmouth College from its fourth-floor dome atop the Center for Science and Business.

As of 2026, one of the observatory astronomers was a member of the Rubin Undergraduate Network that involves and supports undergraduates in research related to the Vera C. Rubin Observatory and, in particular, the Legacy Survey of Space and Time (LSST) using Rubin data for undergraduate astronomy research.

== Equipment ==
Donated in 2015 by William Trubeck, former chief financial officer of several major corporations and a Monmouth College graduate, the Trubeck Telescope is a 20-inch (0.51 m) Corrected Dall-Kirkham Astrograph reflector telescope manufactured by Planewave Instruments. Covering a 52 mm field of view, the f/6.8 optics are held by a carbon-fiber truss design and work with a large format CCD camera and computerized pointing and tracking system.

The Trubeck Telescope operates with a Software Bisque Paramount. Aiming software includes TheSkyX Professional Edition software which can provide simulated star charts from 4700 BC to 10000 AD and can aim the telescope at well over 1.2 million different astronomical objects. Adaptive Optics at the camera are provided by SBIG (Santa Barbara Instrument Group) AO-X hardware and software which provide increased clarity. The telescope has spectroscopy capability that allows users to learn the chemical composition, temperature, luminosity and other details of celestial objects.

Four additional telescopes are also used by the observatory. A fifth telescope, a portable 11-inch Celestron Schmidt-Cassegrain reflecting instrument with pointing software, was added in 2024.

== Architecture ==
The observatory itself is of a Functional Moderne style. The observatory is situated approximately 40 feet above the ground atop a Neo-Georgian brick building constructed in 2013 with specific structural design features built-in to support it.

== See also ==
- List of astronomical observatories
