= Roger J. Fritz =

American management consultant and author

- Born: July 18, 1928; Green County, Wisconsin
- Died: March 24, 2011 (aged 82); Naperville, Illinois
- Resting place: Warren County Memorial Park Cemetery in Monmouth, Illinois
- Education: Monmouth College (B.A.); University of Wisconsin (Madison) Ph.D.
- Occupations: Management consultant, book writer
- Known for: Management Development and Self-help books

Roger J. Fritz

17th President of Willamette University
- In office 1969–1972
- Preceded by: G. Herbert Smith
- Succeeded by: James Corson

Personal details
- Profession: dean

Roger J. Fritz (July 18, 1928 – March 24, 2011) was an American management consultant, columnist, international speaker and author of 63 management development and motivational books. His most popular book was The Power of a Positive Attitude, written in 2008. He was also the 17th president of Willamette University in Oregon, from 1969 to 1972.

== Biography ==
Roger Fritz was born in Green County, Wisconsin, on July 18, 1928. He attended Freeport High School in Freeport, Illinois, graduating in 1946.

Fritz graduated with a bachelor's degree in political science from Monmouth College in Illinois in 1950. He was inducted into the Phi Alpha Theta history honorary in 1948 while at Monmouth College. He was also the Illinois finalist for a Rhodes Scholarship in 1949, and was the state and national oratory champion that same year.

He earned a master's degree in speech and a Ph.D. in educational counseling and personnel services from the University of Wisconsin, Madison in 1952 and 1956 respectively.

He served six years as a college administrator, first as an admissions counselor at Monmouth College, then as a student counselor at the University of Wisconsin, and finally as assistant dean of men and assistant professor at Purdue University from 1953 to 1956. He was manager of public relations at Cummins Engine Company and secretary of Cummins Foundation from 1956 to 1959. He ended his six-year career at John Deere and Co. as director of management development and personnel research and director of the John Deere Foundation.

In 1969, he became president of the 1500-student Willamette University in Salem, Oregon. While there, he instituted planning efforts involving more grassroots participation, developed an institutional research capability, increased faculty salaries and benefits, and expanded the fundraising office programs. In 1972, he founded Organization Development Consultants in Naperville, Illinois, and served over 400 clients. In 1988, he founded his own publishing company, Inside Advantage Publications. He was the author of over 63 books on management development and personnel motivation/self-help. His books were distributed and translated in 38 countries and languages.

Many of his books, including The Curses of Entitlement: 30 Frightening Consequences of Government Payments, remained in print in 2015. What Managers Need to Know was in its sixth printing. How to Manage Your Boss and Think Like a Manager were also especially popular.

He was elected to the board of trustees of Monmouth College in 1957 and was chairman from 1961 to 1969, making him the youngest college board chairman in the country. In August 1967, he was one of three main speakers at the annual meeting of the Association of Governing Boards of Universities and Colleges where he spoke on "Liberal Arts College Trusteeship". In 1968, Fritz served on United States President Lyndon B. Johnson's 14-member Citizens Advisory Board of Youth Opportunity to advise the President on the effectiveness of federal, state and local programs designed to assist disadvantaged young people.

He died on March 24, 2011, in Naperville, Illinois, and was buried at Warren County Memorial Park Cemetery in Monmouth, Illinois.

Academic offices
Preceded by G. Herbert Smith	President of Willamette University; 1969–1972	Succeeded by James Corson
