= Reid K. Beveridge =

United States Army general

Brigadier General Reid K. Beveridge
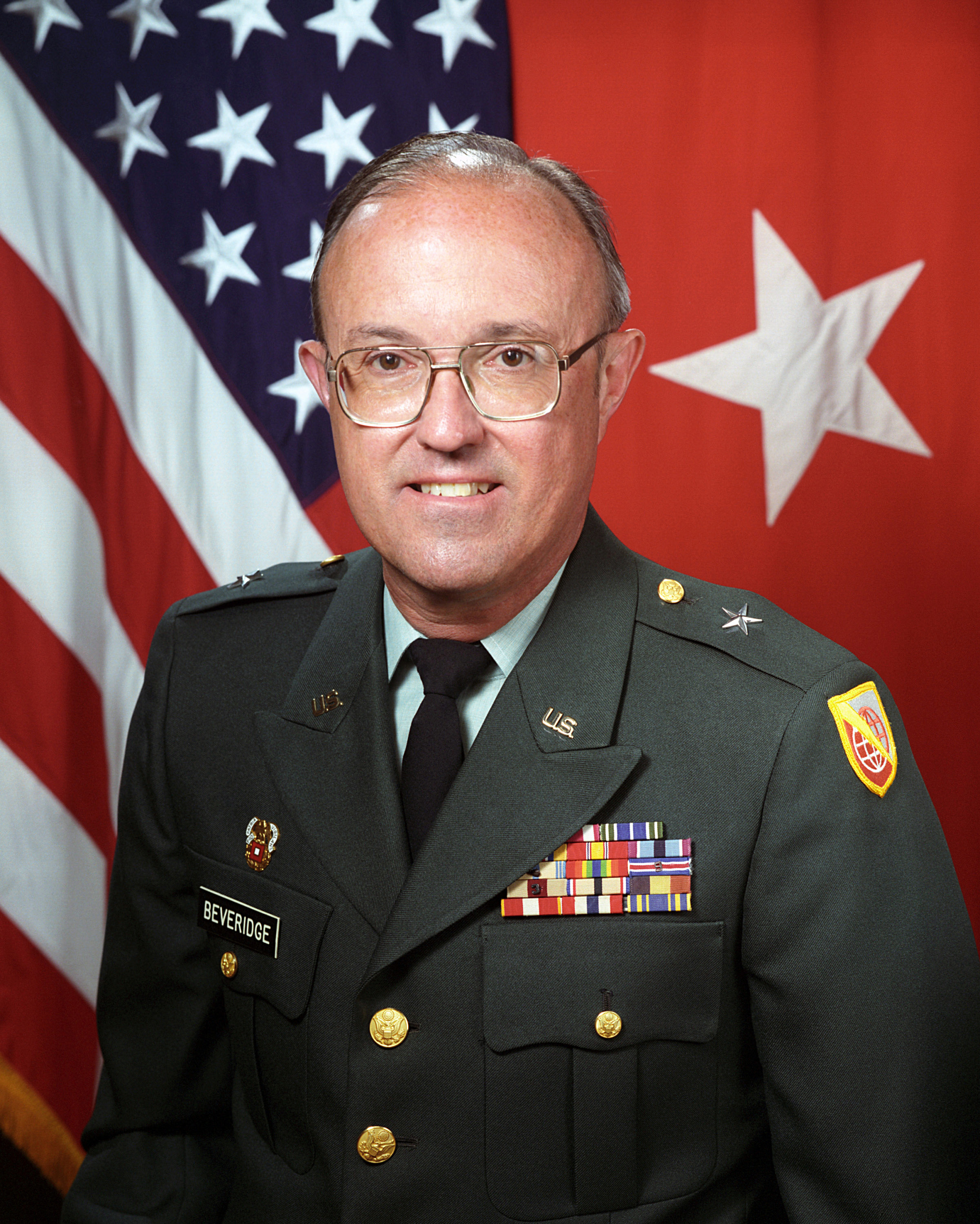
- Born: October 20, 1942; Waverly, Iowa, USA
- Allegiance: United States of America
- Service / branch: National Guard of the United States
- Rank: Brigadier General
- Commands: 261st Signal Command
- Alma mater: Monmouth College, B.A.; Columbia University, M.S.

Reid Kyle Beveridge (born October 20, 1942 in Waverly, Iowa) is a retired brigadier general in the National Guard of the United States.

== Career ==
Beveridge joined the Texas Army National Guard in 1968 and was a member of the command until 1972. He served with the Iowa Army National Guard from 1972 to 1975. Later he was a member of the Wisconsin Army National Guard from 1975 to 1982, when he joined the Delaware Army National Guard. In 1995 he was given command of the 261st Signal Command. His retirement was effective as of June 22, 2000.

Awards he received include the Meritorious Service Medal, the Army Achievement Medal, the Army Reserve Component Achievement Medal with silver oak leaf cluster, the National Defense Service Medal, the Humanitarian Service Medal, the Armed Forces Reserve Medal with hourglass device, the Army Service Ribbon, and the Army Reserve Component Overseas Training Ribbon with award numeral 9.

Currently, Beveridge is a functionary of the Presbyterian church, and contributes right-wing commentary to a number of local publications.

== Education ==
- B.A. – Liberal Arts, Monmouth College, 1964
- M.S. – Journalism, Columbia University

== Personal ==
Beveridge is the son of George Wiley Beveridge and Margaret Elizabeth (Gracey) Beveridge. His father was a newspaper editor and publisher. They lived in Sumner, Iowa in 1942 and Williamsburg, Iowa in 1964. Beveridge was editor of the Monmouth College Oracle weekly student publication and a member of the publications board during his senior year as an undergraduate college student. He was also a member of the college choir and the Sigma Alpha Epsilon fraternity.
