= Trisha Posner =

British non-fiction writer (born 1951)

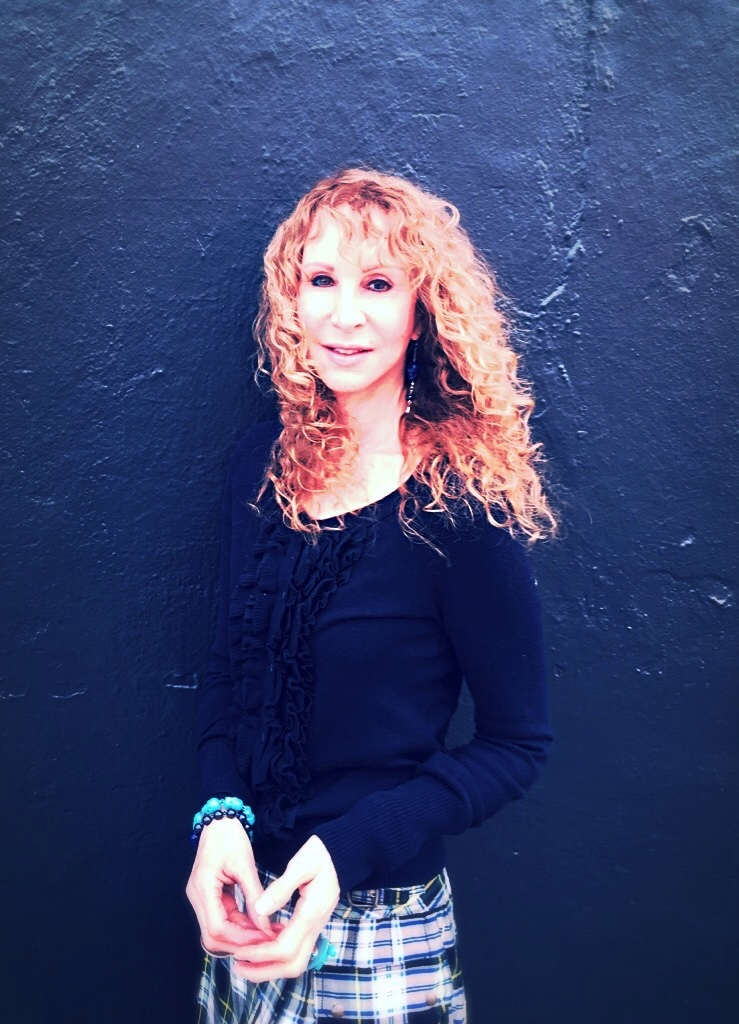
- Born: Patricia Denise Levene; March 10, 1951 (age 75); London, United Kingdom
- Occupation: Writer
- Spouse: Gerald Posner
- Writing career
- Pen name: Patricia Posner
- Genre: Non-fiction
- Website: trishaposner.com

Trisha Posner (born 1951) is a British non-fiction writer. She is the author of This is Not Your Mother's Menopause: One Woman's Natural Journey Through Change (2000), No Hormones, No Fear (2003) and The Pharmacist of Auschwitz: The Untold Story (2017). She also wrote under her full name, Patricia Posner. She lives in Miami.

== Early life ==
Posner was born in London. She left school at age 16. She has spoken on how dyslexia affected her schooling.

After leaving the UK, she travelled to Ibiza and Majorca, doing odd jobs and modelling. She moved to New York in 1978.

She met and married Gerald Posner, who was then a lawyer. They went into journalism and writing together.

== Writing career ==
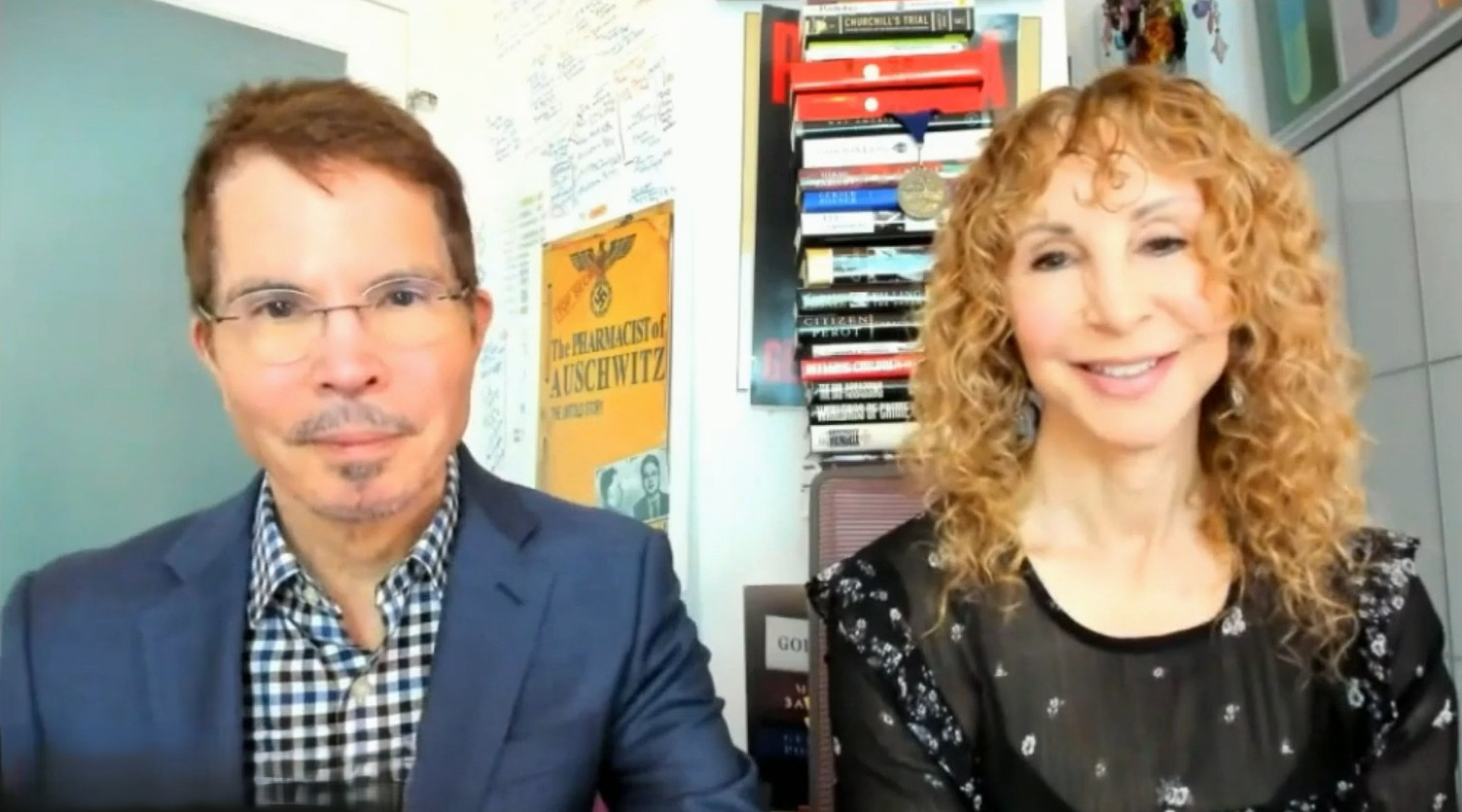
Gerald and Patricia Posner discuss The Pharmacist of Auschwitz in 2026

Posner has worked on thirteen books of nonfiction with her husband, Gerald Posner. According to the St. Petersburg Times, she "works with him on his books and joins him in his interviews, but refuses co-author credit." She has also written articles and profiles for national magazines, including Salon, The Huffington Post, and The Daily Beast.

In 2000, she published her first solo book, a memoir about how she passed through menopause without using hormones, entitled This is Not Your Mother’s Menopause. A sequel, No Hormones, No Fear, was published in 2003.

From 2005 to 2007, she was a columnist for Miami's Ocean Drive magazine. She has also written for Be Healthy.

Posner and her husband worked together on her husband's first book, a biography of Josef Mengele. Posner learned of Victor Capesius and in 2017 wrote The Pharmacist of Auschwitz. The book received praise from Michael Granberry, Arts Critic for The Dallas Morning News, and was on The Wall Street Journal Nonfiction Bestseller list at number 6 on 21 January 2018. The book was translated into sixteen foreign languages and sold in various countries.

== Other media ==
Posner has also been a commentator on television, appearing on NBC, MSNBC and FOX, regarding journalism careers.

In 2022 Posner appeared on Richard Helppie's Common Bridge podcast where she argued that the use of gender-neutral language in medical contexts "erases women" and expressed concern about transgender athletes and transgender people using bathrooms or dressing rooms corresponding to their gender identity.

== Controversy ==
In 2007, she was at the center of a controversy, regarding whether a journalist could express an opinion opposed to that of her publisher on a public issue. According to the New York Post, she was "fired for civic activism." Her 2007 Wikinews interview sets forth the limits and risks for a journalist when it comes to disagreeing publicly with publishers. Her husband wrote about the controversy in The Huffington Post.

== Personal life ==
In 2021 Posner was diagnosed with breast cancer. She is now in remission.

Posner is Jewish and has spoken on the Antisemitism she faced in her childhood.

== Books ==
- Posner, Trisha (2000). This is not your mother's menopause : one woman's natural journey through change (Uncorrected proof. ed.). New York: Villard Books. ISBN 978-0375503986.
- Posner, Trisha (2003). No hormones, no fear : a natural journey through menopause (Villard Books trade pbk. ed. ed.). New York: Villard Books. ISBN 9780812967555.
- Posner, Patricia (2017). The Pharmacist of Auschwitz: The Untold Story. Crux Publishing Ltd. ISBN 9781909979406.
