= James Leonard Pate =

American Business Executive

- Born: September 6, 1935; Mount Sterling, Illinois
- Died: January 18, 2003 (aged 67)
- Resting place: Forest Park Westheimer Cemetery
- Education: Monmouth College, Indiana University at Bloomington
- Occupations: Chairman and CEO of a major international corporation

James Leonard Pate (1935–2003) was former board chairman and chief executive officer of the Pennzoil-Quaker State Co. and assistant secretary of commerce and economic spokesman for U.S. President Gerald Ford.

== Biography ==
Born on Sept. 6, 1935, in Mount Sterling, Ill., Pate grew up on a farm in Monmouth, Ill. He earned a Bachelor of Arts degree at Monmouth College Illinois (1963), and master of Business Administration and Ph.D. degree in business-economics from Indiana University at Bloomington.

From 1953 to 1961, Pate served in the Army (Airborne), becoming a master parachutist. He received a direct commission in 1960. His final assignment was with the 101st Airborne Division.

Pate's early career included service as professor of economics at Monmouth College in Illinois, senior economist for the Federal Reserve Bank of Cleveland, Ohio, and chief economist for the B.F. Goodrich Co. in Akron, Ohio.

For 15 months beginning in 1974, Pate as assistant secretary of commerce was one of U.S. President Ford's chief economic spokesmen. During that period he also was chief economist for the U.S. Department of Commerce.

In 1976 he became special adviser to Ford, serving as the administration's "point man" on consumer problems during his three months in that job.

Pate joined Pennzoil in 1976 after James A. Baker III, the future U.S. Secretary of State, recommended him to the chairman of the company's board. Pate became Pennzoil's first chief economist. He served as president of Pennzoil Company from 1990 to 1997, chief executive officer from 1990 until 1999 and as chairman of the board from 1994 to 1999.

His association with the company ended in 2002 with its acquisition by Shell Oil Products US, an affiliate of the Royal Dutch Shell Group of Companies.

Pate served as a director and chairman of the board of directors of Devon Energy Corporation beginning in 1999.

Pate also authored or co-authored three books and numerous articles in professional journals. He was inducted into the Monmouth College Hall of Achievement in 1992.

He was a Presbyterian. Pate died on January 18, 2003, and was entombed in Forest Park Westheimer Cemetery.
