= Karen Bush =

American biochemist

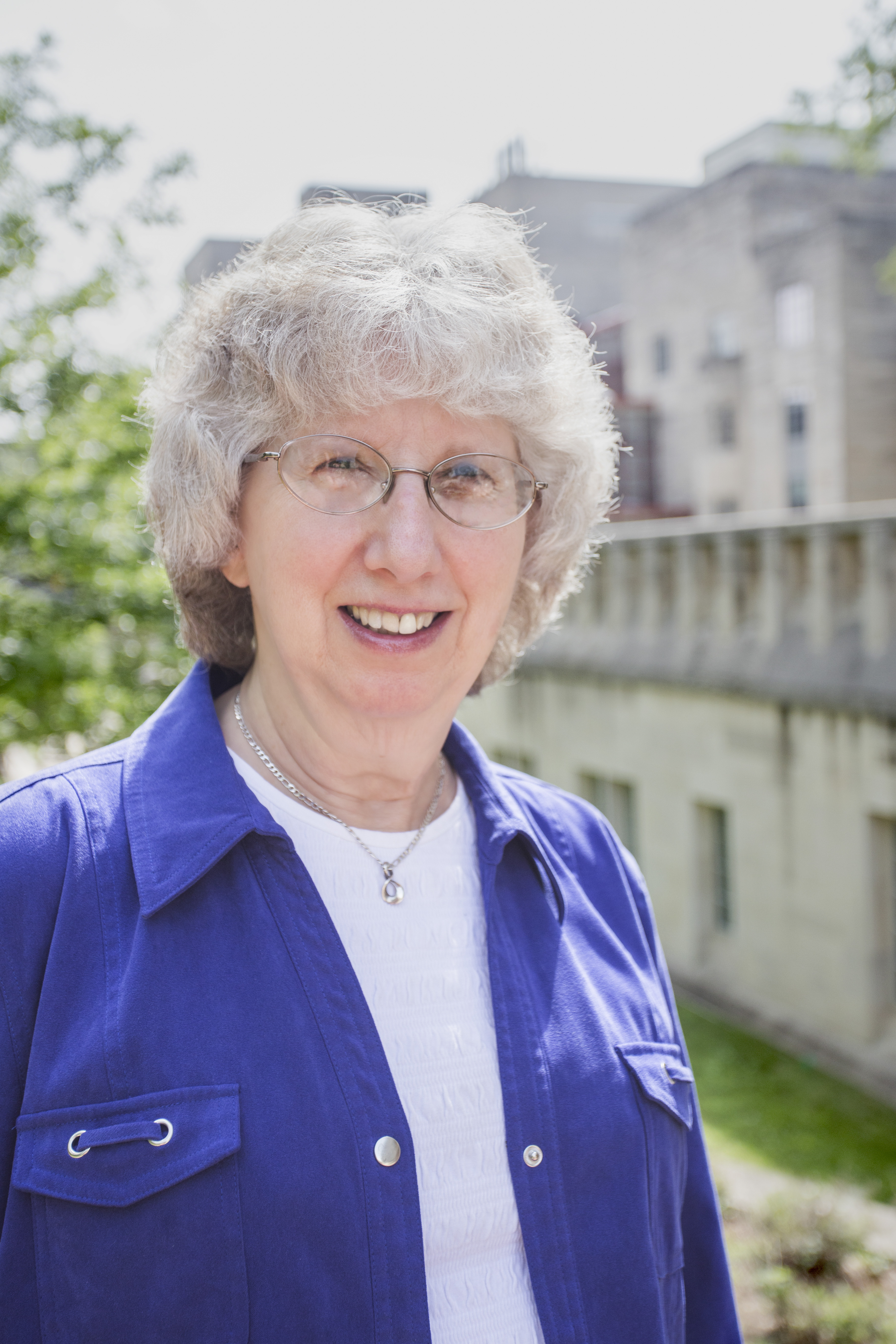
- Education: University of California (Santa Barbara) post-doctoral fellow; Indiana University Bloomington, Ph.D, 1970; Monmouth College, B.A., 1965
- Known for: Antimicrobial resistance research, Beta-lactam antibiotics
- Spouse(s): Daniel J. Watts, (m.) 1973 - present
- Children: (2) Edward J. Watts and Amber E. Watts
- Awards: Excellence in Standards Award (2015), Hamao Umezawa Memorial Award (2017), AAAS Fellow (2025)
- Website: https://biology.indiana.edu/about/faculty/emeriti/bush-karen.html

Karen Bush is an American biochemist. She is a professor of Practice in Biology Emerita at Indiana University Bloomington and served as the interim director of the Biotechnology program from 2019 to 2022. She worked in antibiotic drug discovery and drug development in the pharmaceutical industry for 35 years. Bush conducted research focusing on the activity of novel antimicrobial agents against Gram-negative bacteria and bacterial resistance mechanisms to beta-lactam antibiotics.

== Education ==
Bush received her BA, magna cum laude from Monmouth College in 1965, with a major in chemistry and a minor in math-physics. In 1970 Bush graduated from Indiana University Bloomington with her Ph.D. in biochemistry under Henry R. Mahler. Bush was a postdoctoral fellow at the University of California, Santa Barbara from 1970 to 1971.

== Scientific contributions ==
Bush is internationally known for her research on the discovery and characterization of beta-lactamases, the family of enzymes that confer resistance to penicillins and cephalosporins. Antibiotic resistance has emerged as a key threat to the global fight against infectious diseases, and Bush's research into the mechanisms of action for beta-lactamases has provided key insights in development of beta-lactamase inhibitors to combat these modes of resistance. Her review article on beta-lactamases established commonly used nomenclature. She co-curated a website for this family of enzymes that has named over 2000 beta lactamases.

During her 36 years of antibiotic discovery efforts in the pharmaceutical industry, Bush worked on the research teams that brought 9 anti-infective leads to clinical trials and 5 antibiotics to FDA and/or EMA approval (aztreonam, piperacillin-tazobactam, levofloxacin, doripenem and ceftobiprole). As a professor, Bush has continued to lead research characterizing beta-lactam resistance in enteric bacteria and collaborated with pharmaceutical companies in evaluating clinical potential of novel antibacterial agents by studying the spectrum of activity and mechanisms of resistance. This work has been included in data packages submitted to the FDA for drug approval, and research from her laboratory has supported the approval process for 6 new antibacterial therapies (ceftolozane-tazobactam, ceftazidime-avibactam, plazomicin, eravacycline, imipenem-relebactam and cefiderocol).

== Professional career ==
After completing her postdoctoral research, Bush became an instructor of biochemistry in the University of North Carolina Chapel Hill School of Medicine for a year before serving as an visiting assistant professor of chemistry at the University of Delaware from 1972 to 1973. She then started an 18-year stint at The Squibb Institute for Medical Research in Princeton, NJ, spending her first 3 years in the analytical chemistry department before beginning her research on beta-lactamases and beta-lactamase inhibitors. While at The Squibb Institute, Bush was part of the team that discovered Aztreonam and rose from a Research Investigator position to increasing leadership and research scientist roles, ultimately named not only a principal investigator but also as a research leader and a research fellow.

She then went on to American Cyanamid/American Home Products/Wyeth-Ayerst in Pearl River, NJ. Continuing her research and discovery efforts in antibiotic chemotherapy where she led teams that discovered a new oral carbapenem and supported the registration and launch of piperacillin-tazobactam (Zosyn®). After a year as Director of Microbial Biochemistry at the Astra Research Center in Boston, Bush moved on to lead antibacterial discovery and development teams at Johnson & Johnson Pharmaceutical Research & Development, Raritan NJ from 1997 to 2009.

In 2010, Bush returned to academia, to lead research studies, to teach and mentor graduate students, and recently retired as a professor of Practice in Biotechnology in the Biology Department at Indiana University in Bloomington, Indiana. After retirement from J&J, she also became an independent consultant to a number of pharmaceutical and biotech companies specializing in antimicrobial research, serving as a member of many of their Scientific Advisory Boards.

== Awards and honors ==
Within the American Society of Microbiology, she was elected a Fellow of the American Academy of Microbiology in 2000 and selected as the ICAAC Lecturer in 2014.

In 2015 she was awarded the "Excellence in Standards Award" from the Clinical and Laboratory Standards Institute (CLSI). In 2015 she was also recognized with the Monmouth College Hall of Achievement Award.

In recognition of her outstanding research in antibiotic chemotherapy, Bush received the Hamao Umezawa Memorial Award on November 24, 2017, at the 30th annual meeting for the International Society of Chemotherapy for Infection and Cancer, held in Taipei, Taiwan. She was the first woman to receive the award.

In 2025 she was inducted as a Fellow of the American Association for the Advancement of Science (AAAS).

== Professional activities ==
As a world recognized expert in the field of antibiotic discovery, Bush is involved in numerous scientific communities and services.

- ASM. She has served in a variety of positions for the American Society of Microbiology (ASM): from 2014 to 2018 she served on the election committee for the American Academy of Microbiology including as chair in 2017; between 1994 and 2007 she held officer roles for Division A and as chair for the last 2 of those years; she has been on the planning committee for the ICAAC meetings (2004–2011), the MIcrobe meetings (2017–2019), and ICAAC-IDSA (2008).
- Clinical and Laboratory Standards Institute (CLSI). Since 1996, Bush has served in various roles at CLSI including Advisor, member and chair for various antimicrobial susceptibility working groups that set the clinical microbiology laboratory screening standards.
- Editorial Activities. Bush has been an editor for the scientific journals Antimicrobial Agents & Chemotherapy, Antimicrobial Therapeutics Reviews published by New York Academy of Science, mBio and EcoSal Plus. She has also been on the editorial boards of 10 scientific journals.
- She has been a reviewer of grant applications for the NIH, CARB-X, the CDC, the DOD, the Wellcome Trust and GARDP.

== Publications ==
Bush has authored over 230 peer-reviewed publications with over 45,000 citations and an overall h-index of 87. She has co-authored 27 book chapters, edited a book, authored or co-authored over 235 poster presentations at international meetings, and has been an invited speaker at over 125 scientific meetings or symposia. She is an inventor on 4 issued US patents.

Representative publications include:

- Bush K. 2023. Classification for beta-lactamases: historical perspectives. Exp. Rev. Anti-Infect. Ther. 21:5, 513–522, DOI: 10.1080/14787210.2023.2194633.
- Bradford PA, Bonomo RA, Bush K, Carattoli A, Feldgarden M, Haft DH, Ishii Y, Jacoby GA, Klimke W, Palzkill T, Poirel L, Rossolini GM, Tamma PD, Arias C.A. 2022. Consensus on beta-lactamase nomenclature. Antimicrobial Agents & Chemotherapy. 2022 04 19;66(4):e0033322.
- Theuretzbacher U, Bush K, Harbarth S, Paul M, Rex JH, Tacconelli E, Thwaites GE. 2020. Critical analysis of antibacterial agents in clinical development. Nature Rev. Microbiol. 18:286-298.
- Mack AR, Barnes MD, Taracila MA, Hujer AM, Hujer KM, Cabot G, Feldgarden M, Haft DH, Klimke W, van den Akker F, Vila AJ, Smania A, Haider S, Papp-Wallace KM, Bradford PA, Rossolini GM, Docquier JD, Frere JM, Galleni M, Hanson ND, Oliver A, Plesiat P, Poirel L, Nordmann P, Palzkill TG, Jacoby GA, Bush K, Bonomo RA. 2019. A standard numbering scheme for class C beta-lactamases. Antimicrob. Agents Chemother. 11:11.
- Zhang, Y., A. Kashikar, C. A. Brown, G. Denys, and K. Bush. 2017. An unusual E. coli PBP3 insertion sequence identified from a collection of carbapenem-resistant Enterobacteriaceae (CRE) tested in vitro with ceftazidime-, ceftaroline- or aztreonam-avibactam combinations. Antimicrob Agents Chemother, August 2017. 61:e00389-17.
- Bush, K., P. Courvalin, G. Dantas, J. Davies, B. Eisenstein, P. Huovinen, G. A. Jacoby, R. Kishony, B. N. Kreiswirth, E. Kutter, S. A. Lerner, S. Levy, K. Lewis, O. Lomovskaya, J. H. Miller, S. Mobashery, L. J. V. Piddock, S. Projan, C. M. Thomas, A. Tomasz, P. M. Tulkens, T. R. Walsh, J. D. Watson, J. Witkowski, W. Witte, G. Wright, P. Yeh, and H. I. Zgurskaya. 2011. Tackling antibiotic resistance. Nature Review Microbiology. 9:894-896.
- Bush K, Jacoby GA. Updated functional classification of beta-lactamases. Antimicrob Agents Chemother. 2010;54(3):969-976.
- Queenan, A. M., W. Shang, K. Bush, and R. K. Flamm. 2010. Differential selection of single-step AmpC or efflux mutants of Pseudomonas aeruginosa by using cefepime, ceftazidime, or ceftobiprole. Antimicrob. Agents Chemother. 54: 4092–4097.
- Morrow B. J., W. He, K. M. Amsler, B. D. Foleno, M. J. Macielag, A. S. Lynch, and K. Bush. 2010. In vitro antibacterial activities of JNJ-Q2, a new broad-spectrum fluoroquinolone. Antimicrob. Agents Chemother. 54:1955-1964.
- Kao, L. .M., K. Bush, R.. Barnewall, J. Estep, F. W. Thalacker, P. H. Olson, G. L. Drusano, N. Minton, S. Chien, A. Hemeryck, and M. F. Kelley MF. 2006. Pharmacokinetic considerations and efficacy of levofloxacin in an inhalational anthrax (postexposure) rhesus monkey model. Antimicrob. Agents Chemother. 50 3535–3542.
- Queenan, A. M., Torres-Viera, C., Gold, H. S., Carmeli, Y., Eliopoulos, G. M., Moellering, R. C. Jr, Quinn, J. P., Hindler, J., Medeiros, A. A., & Bush, K. (2000). SME-type carbapenem-hydrolyzing class A beta-lactamases from geographically diverse Serratia marcescens strains. Antimicrobial agents and chemotherapy, 44(11). 3035–3039.
- Bush, K., G. A. Jacoby and A. A. Medeiros. 1995. A functional classification scheme for beta-lactamases. Antimicrob. Agents Chemother. 39:1211-1233.
- Rasmussen, B. A., P. A. Bradford, J. P. Quinn, J. Wiener, R. A. Weinstein, and K. Bush. 1993. Genetically diverse ceftazidime-resistant isolates from a single center: Biochemical and genetic characterization of TEM-10 beta-lactamases encoded by different nucleotide sequences. Antimicrob. Agents Chemother. 37:1989-1992.
- Bush K, Macalintal C, Rasmussen BA, Lee VJ, Yang Y. Kinetic interactions of tazobactam with beta-lactamases from all major structural classes. Antimicrob Agents Chemother. 1993;37(4):851-858.
- Bush, K., S. K. Tanaka, D. Bonner and R. B. Sykes. 1985. Resistance caused by decreased penetration of beta-lactam antibiotics into Enterobacter cloacae. Antimicrob. Agents Chemother. 27:555-560.
- Sykes, R. B., C. M. Cimarusti, D. P. Bonner, K. Bush, D. M. Floyd, N. H. Georgopapadakou, W. H. Koster, W. C. Liu, W. L. Parker, P. A. Principe, M. L. Rathnum, W. A. Slusarchyk, W. H. Trejo and J. S. Wells Jr. 1981. Monocyclic beta-lactam antibiotics produced by bacteria. Nature 291:489-491.
- Bush K, Bonner DP, Sykes RB. Izumenolide-a novel beta-lactamase inhibitor produced by Micromonospora. II. Biological properties. J Antibiot (Tokyo). 1980;33(11):1262-1269.
