= Associated Colleges of the Midwest =

Associated Colleges of the Midwest (ACM) is a consortium of 14 private liberal arts colleges, primarily in the Midwestern United States. The 14 colleges are located in five states: Colorado, Illinois, Iowa, Minnesota, and Wisconsin. The ACM was established in 1958 and is headquartered in Chicago, Illinois. The consortium's president is Lisa Jasinski.
