= List of Confederate monuments and memorials in North Carolina =

Confederate monuments and memorials in North Carolina

Note: This is a sublist of List of Confederate monuments and memorials from the North Carolina section.

This is a list of Confederate monuments and memorials in North Carolina that were established as public displays and symbols of the Confederate States of America (CSA), Confederate leaders, or Confederate soldiers of the American Civil War. Part of the commemoration of the American Civil War, these symbols include monuments and statues, flags, holidays and other observances, and the names of schools, roads, parks, bridges, counties, cities, lakes, dams, military bases, and other public works. (Note: "In an effort to assist the efforts of local communities to re-examine these symbols, the SPLC launched a study to catalog them. For the final tally, the researchers excluded nearly 2,600 markers, battlefields, museums, cemeteries and other places or symbols that are largely historical in nature.")

This list does not include items which are largely historic in nature such as historic markers or battlefield parks if they were not established to honor the Confederacy. Nor does it include figures connected with the origins of the Civil War or white supremacy, but not with the Confederacy.

According to the Southern Poverty Law Center, there are at least 140 public spaces with Confederate monuments in North Carolina.

Governor Roy Cooper "has called for the removal of monuments honoring Confederate soldiers and generals", including the Chapel Hill Silent Sam statue. He has called for the repeal of a 2015 law requiring legislative approval to remove Confederate monuments.

== State capitol ==
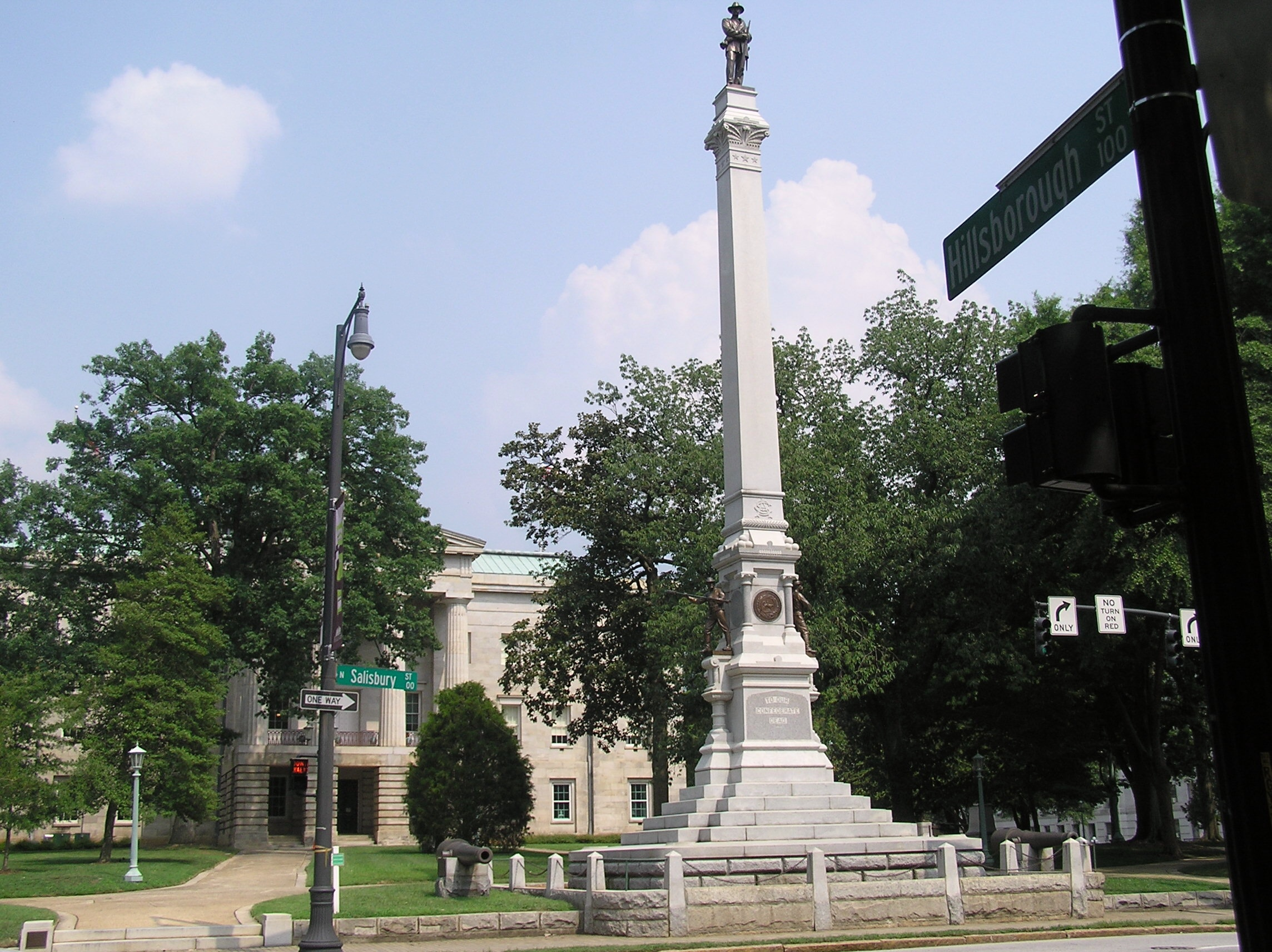
State Confederate Monument to the west of the state capitol

- North Carolina State Capitol. The Capitol currently houses the offices of the Governor of North Carolina. The legislature relocated to its current location in the North Carolina State Legislative Building in 1963.
  In 2017, Governor Roy Cooper unsuccessfully petitioned the North Carolina Historical Commission to move the following three Confederate monuments from the grounds of the state Capitol to the Bentonville Battlefield, a Civil War site in Johnston County. The Commission found that the 2015 law prohibited their removal, but recommended signage to add context to the monuments, including noting that slavery was a cause of the Civil War. The Commission also found unanimously that the Capitol monuments are "an overrepresentation and over-memorialization" of the Confederacy and Civil War in North Carolina. The Commission urged the state’s Department of Natural and Cultural Resources to plan and raise money for a monument recognizing the contributions of African Americans to North Carolina's history. On June 19, 2020, the two statues at the base of the monument were toppled by protestors. The protestors proceeded to drag one statue to the streets and hang it from a street light.
  - Monument Removed June 21, 2020 - North Carolina State Confederate Monument (1895), also known as the Soldiers and Sailors Monument. "This 75-foot-tall monument to fallen Confederate soldiers is located on the State Capitol grounds. At the top of the column is a statue depicting a Confederate artillery soldier holding a gun. Near the bottom of the column are two statues, one representing the Confederate infantry and the other a Confederate cavalryman. Two 32 pounder naval cannons stand on each side of the monument." Contains the Seal of North Carolina. Front: "To Our Confederate Dead." Rear: "First at Bethel, last at Appomattox".
  - Monument Removed June 21, 2020 - Monument to North Carolina Women of the Confederacy, also called Confederate Women's Monument (1914). "The seven foot tall monument, made possible through a private donation, honors the hardships and sacrifices of North Carolina women during the Civil War. A bronze sculpture depicts an older woman, a grandmotherly figure, holding a book as she sits next to a young boy holding a sword. It sits on top of a granite base with bronze bas-relief plaques. The woman, representing the women in the South as the custodians of history, imparts the history of the Civil War to the boy. The two relief plaques portray the Civil War; the eastern side shows soldiers departing for war and leaving their loved ones behind, while the western side depicts a weary or injured Confederate soldier returning home." In 2019, a protester placed Ku Klux Klan hoods on the two figures.
  - Monument Removed June 21, 2020 - Henry Lawson Wyatt Monument (1912). He was the first Confederate soldier to die in battle. Sculpture by Gutzon Borglum. Inscriptions:
    Front: HENRY LAWSON WYATT / PRIVATE CO. A / BETHEL REGIMENT / NORTH CAROLINA VOLUNTEERS / KILLED AT BETHEL CHURCH / JUNE 10, 1861 / FIRST CONFEDERATE SOLDIER | TO FALL IN BATTLE IN THE | WAR BETWEEN THE STATES.
    Rear: WYATT'S COMRADES / IN DASH TO BURN THE HOUSE / GEORGE T. WILLIAMS / JOHN H. THORPE / ROBERT H. RICKS / ROBERT H. BRADLEY / THOMAS FALLON / ERECTED BY THE NORTH CAROLINA | DIVISION, UNITED DAUGHTERS | OF THE CONFEDERACY. / JUNE 10, 1912
    Base, east face: GORHAM. Co. FOUNDERS.
- In addition, the following Civil War monuments are on the Capitol grounds:
  - A statue of Confederate Colonel Zebulon Baird Vance, Governor during the Civil War, 1862–1865.
  - Monument to Civil War Captain and North Carolina legislator Samuel A'Court Ashe (1940), two plaques on a large granite block.

== Monuments ==
=== Courthouse monuments ===
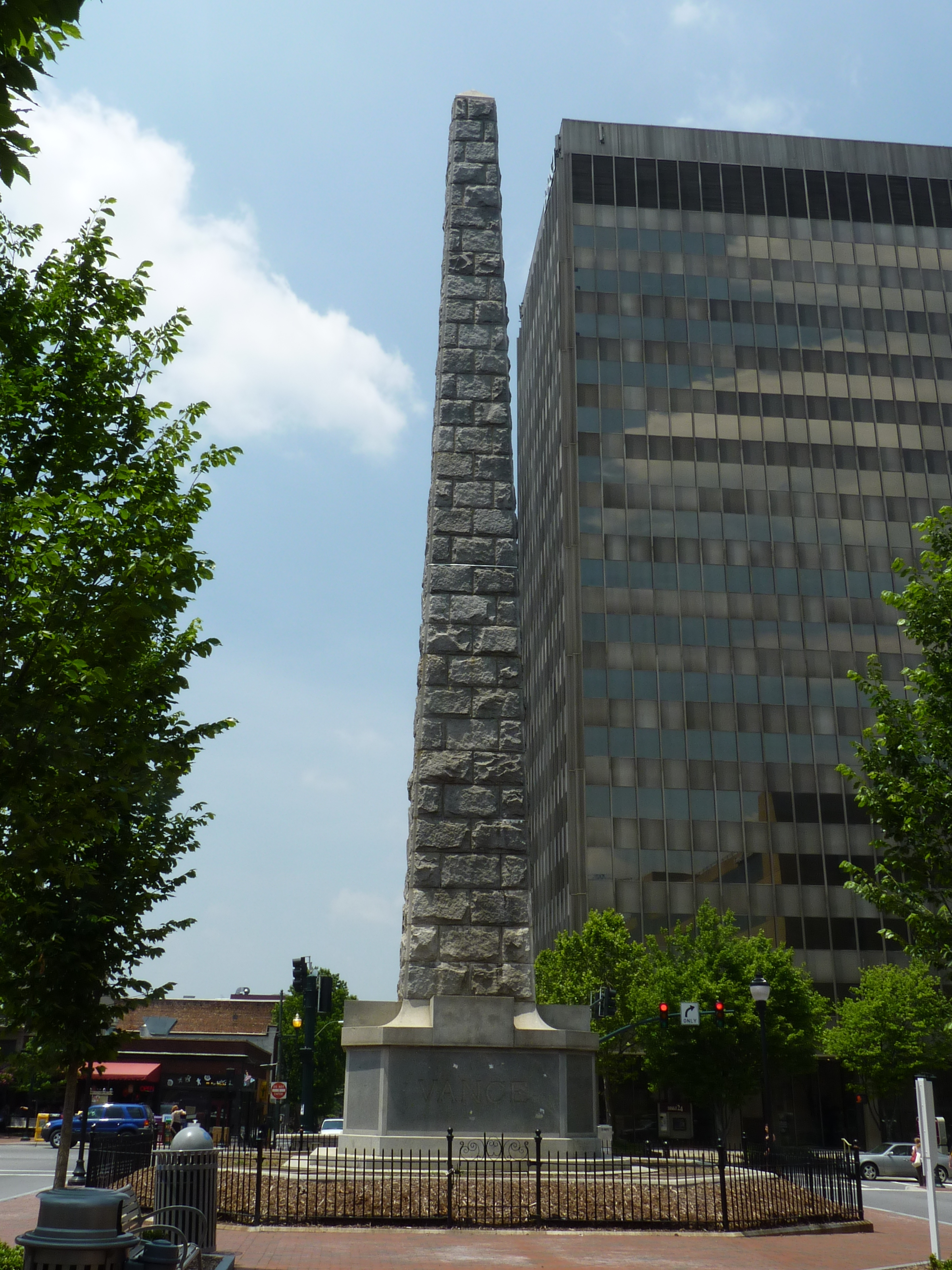
Zebulon Baird Vance Monument in Asheville, North Carolina

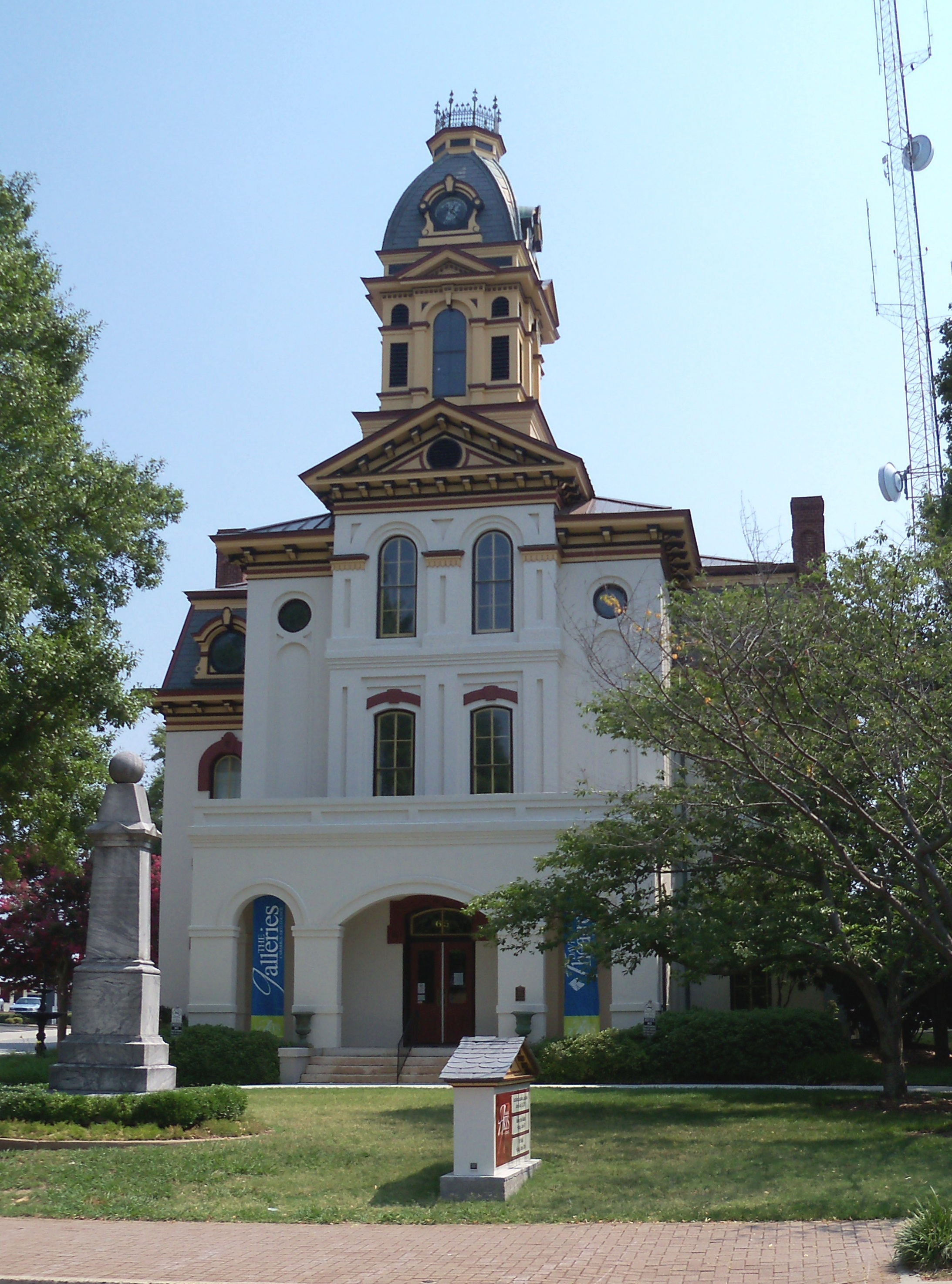
Confederate Soldiers Monument at Old Cabarrus County Courthouse, Concord, North Carolina

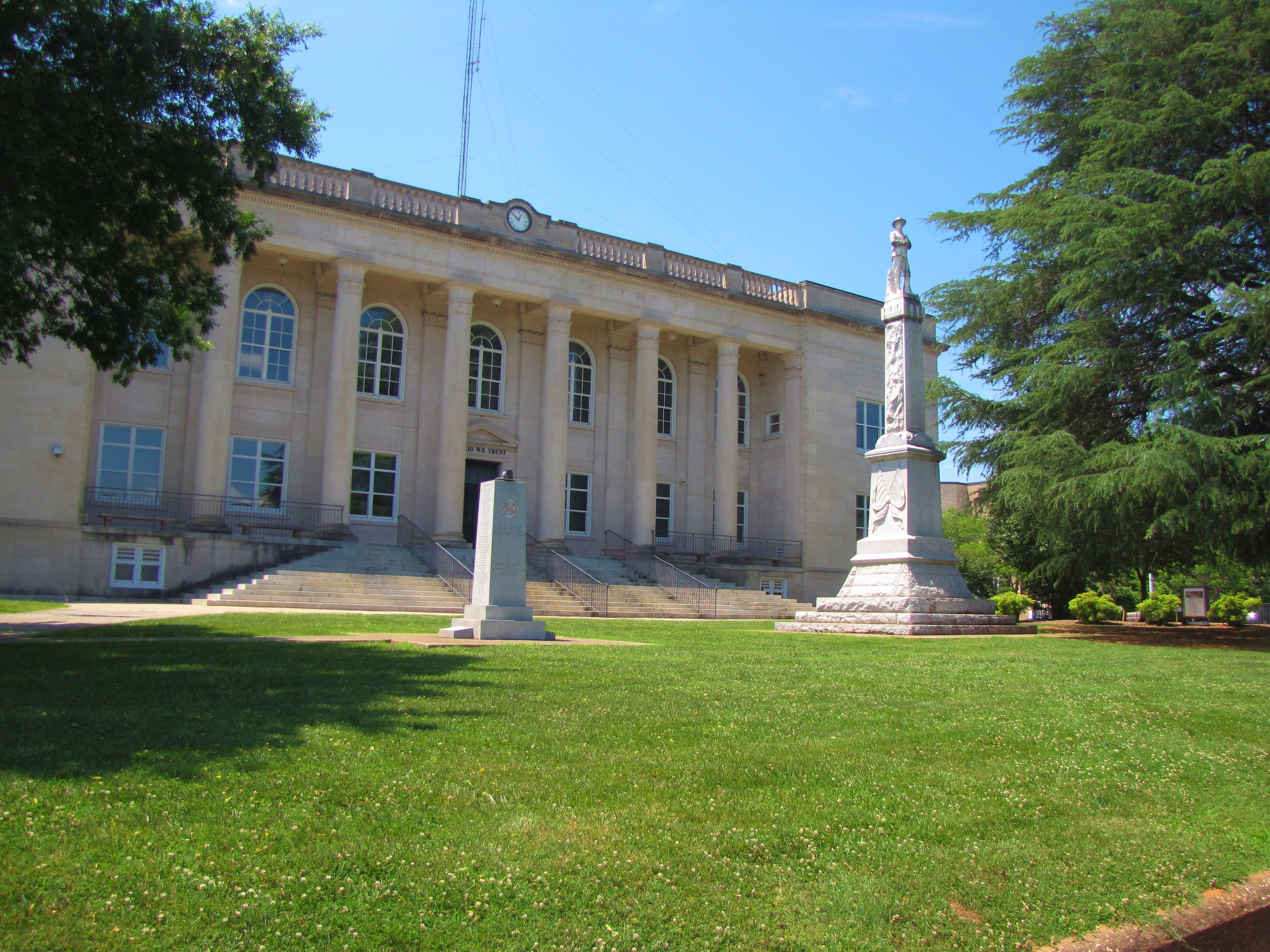
Monument at Rutherford County Courthouse

- Albemarle: Confederate Soldiers Monument (1925)
- Asheville:
  - To be removed per 6–1 decision of Asheville City Council on March 23, 2021: Zebulon Baird Vance Monument, a granite obelisk erected in 1896. Near the obelisk, a small granite marker memorializes the Dixie Highway, Confederate Gen. Robert E. Lee, and Col. John Connally, a Confederate officer who was wounded at the Battle of Gettysburg. Near the Buncombe County Courthouse entrance, a smaller obelisk memorializes Confederate soldiers from Buncombe County who fought at Chickamauga and in other Civil War battles. The monument was vandalized in August 2017 and 4 individuals out of 30–40 protesters were arrested for trying to remove it with crowbars.
  - Monument to 60th Regiment North Carolina Volunteers (1905)
  - Memorial plaque to Lieutenant William Henry Hardy (1930), "the First Soldier from Buncombe County to Fall in the War Between The States"
- Bakersville: Mitchell County's Confederate Dead Monument (2011) commemorates 79 men "who died for their freedom and independence. And not for slavery."
- Beaufort: Carteret County Confederate Soldiers Monument (1926) at the Carteret County Courthouse. "TO THE MEMORY OF THE CONFEDERATE DEAD OF CARTERET COUNTY 1861-1865 ERECTED BY THE DAUGHTERS OF CONFEDERACY FORT MACON CHAPTER BEAUFORT, N.C. 1926 NOT EVEN TIME CAN DESTROY HEROISM"
- Burgaw: Confederate Soldiers Monument (1914)
- Burnsville: Confederate Soldiers Monument (2009)
- Clinton: Monument removed July 12, 2020. Confederate Soldiers Monument (1916). "In honor of the Confederate soldiers of Sampson County who bore the flag of a nation's trust and fell in a cause though lost still just and died for me and you."
- Columbia: Confederate Soldiers Monument (1902); "In appreciation of our faithful slaves"
- Concord: Confederate Soldiers Monument (1892) at Old Cabarrus County Courthouse
- Currituck: Confederate Soldiers Monument "To Our Confederate Dead 1861–1865" (1918)
- Dallas: Gaston County Confederate Soldier Monument (2003)
- Danbury: Confederate Soldiers Monument (1990)
- Dobson: Confederate Soldiers Monument (2000)
- Elizabeth City: Confederate Soldiers Monument (1911)
- Gastonia: Confederate Soldiers Monument, Gaston County Courthouse, dedicated November 21, 1912
- Graham: Confederate Soldiers Monument (1914), Alamance County Courthouse. Demonstrators called for its removal in 2017, and the matter was discussed at an Alamance County Commission meeting.
- Greenville: Confederate Soldiers Monument (1914)
- Hendersonville: Confederate Soldiers Monument (1905)
- Hertford: Confederate Soldiers Monument (1912)
- Laurinburg: Confederate Soldiers Monument (1912), sponsored by UDC. "The Scotland County monument has been moved several times in the years since first being placed. Originally it sat in the middle of the road in front of the courthouse at Main and Church streets. It was then moved onto the grounds of the courthouse after becoming a traffic hazard. When the new courthouse was completed in the 1960s, the monument moved with it and was placed in its current location.... [T]he inside contains time capsules."
- Lincolnton: Confederate Soldiers Memorial Drinking Fountain (1911)
- Louisburg: The Confederate Memorial Drinking Fountain (1923) is dedicated to North Carolinian Orren Randolph Smith, who designed the Stars and Bars, the first official flag of the Confederacy. It is five feet high, six feet across, and has separate "white" and "colored" drinking fountains. A similar marker is in Wilson, North Carolina (below).
- Lumberton: Confederate Soldiers Monument (1907)
- Marion: Veterans Memorial
- Morganton: Confederate Soldiers Monument at Old Courthouse (1918)
- Newton: Catawba County Confederate Soldiers Monument (1907), Old Catawba County Courthouse
- Oxford: the Granville Gray- originally dedicated directly in front of the Granville County Courthouse it was moved to the local library after the 1970 protests following the murder of Henry Marrow.
- Plymouth: Battle of Plymouth monument (1928) at Washington County Courthouse
- Roxboro:
  - Confederate Monument (1931)
  - Confederate Soldiers Monument, Person County Courthouse, erected in 1922, UDC.
- Rutherfordton: Confederate Soldiers Monument (1910)
- Shelby: Confederate Soldiers Monument (1907) at Old Courthouse
- Snow Hill: Confederate Soldiers Monument (1929)
- Statesville: Confederate Soldiers Monument (1906) at Iredell County Courthouse
- Taylorsville: Confederate Soldiers Monument (1958)
- Trenton: Confederate Soldiers Monument (1960)
- Wadesboro:
  - Confederate Soldiers Monument (1906)
  - Confederate Women Monument (1934)
- Warrenton: Confederate Soldiers Monument (1913)
- Waynesville: Confederate Soldiers Monument (1940)
- Wilkesboro: Confederate Soldiers Monument (1998)
- Wilson: Memorial Drinking Fountain (1926). This fountain, like a similar one from the same artist in Louisburg, NC, originally had "white" and "colored" water fountains, separated by the Confederate flag. The water bowls have been removed and replaced with generic tops, and the labels "white" and "colored" sandblasted off; their location is clearly visible.
- Winton: Confederate Soldiers Monument (1913)

=== Other public monuments ===
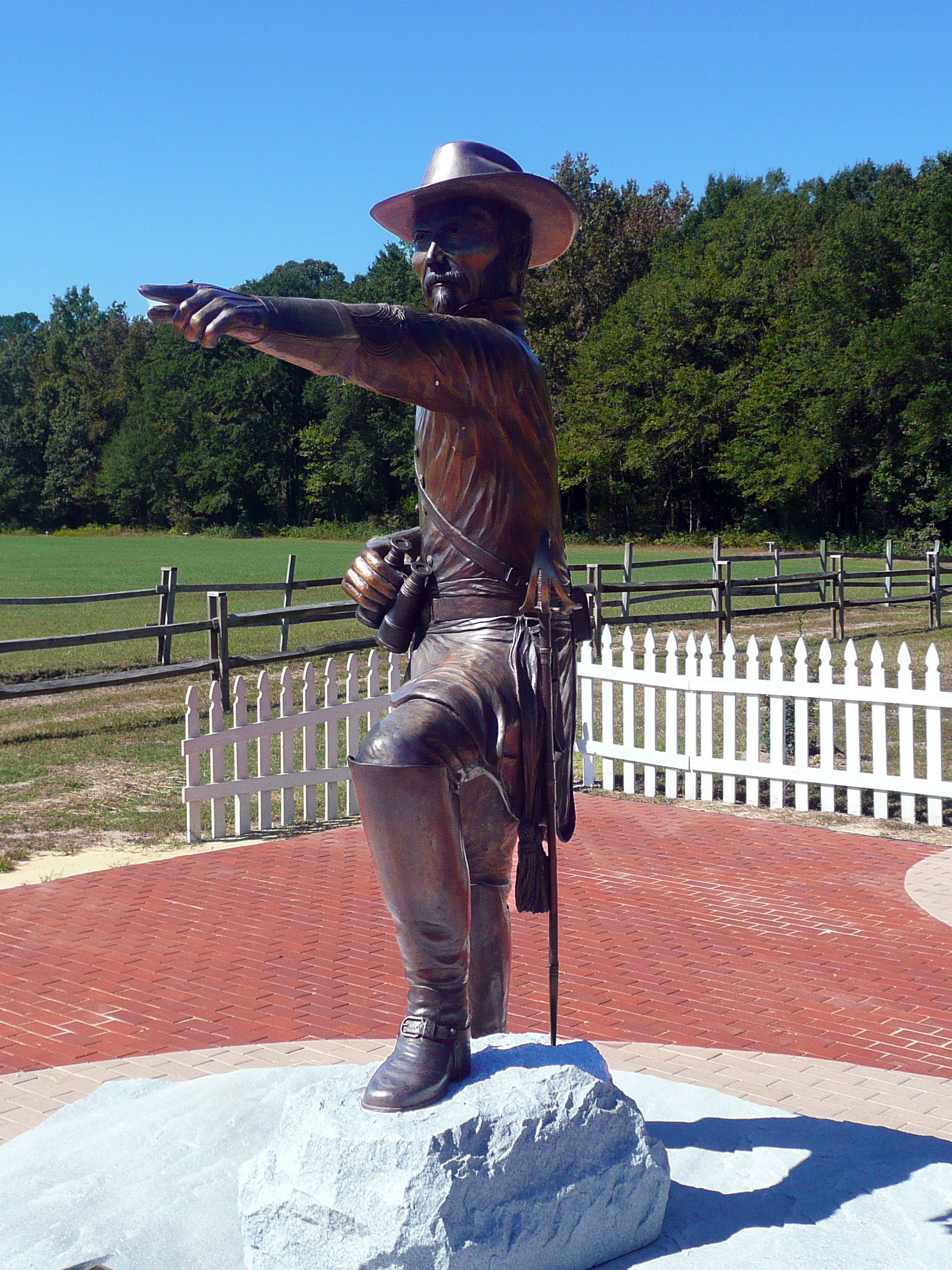
Joseph E. Johnston, Bentonville

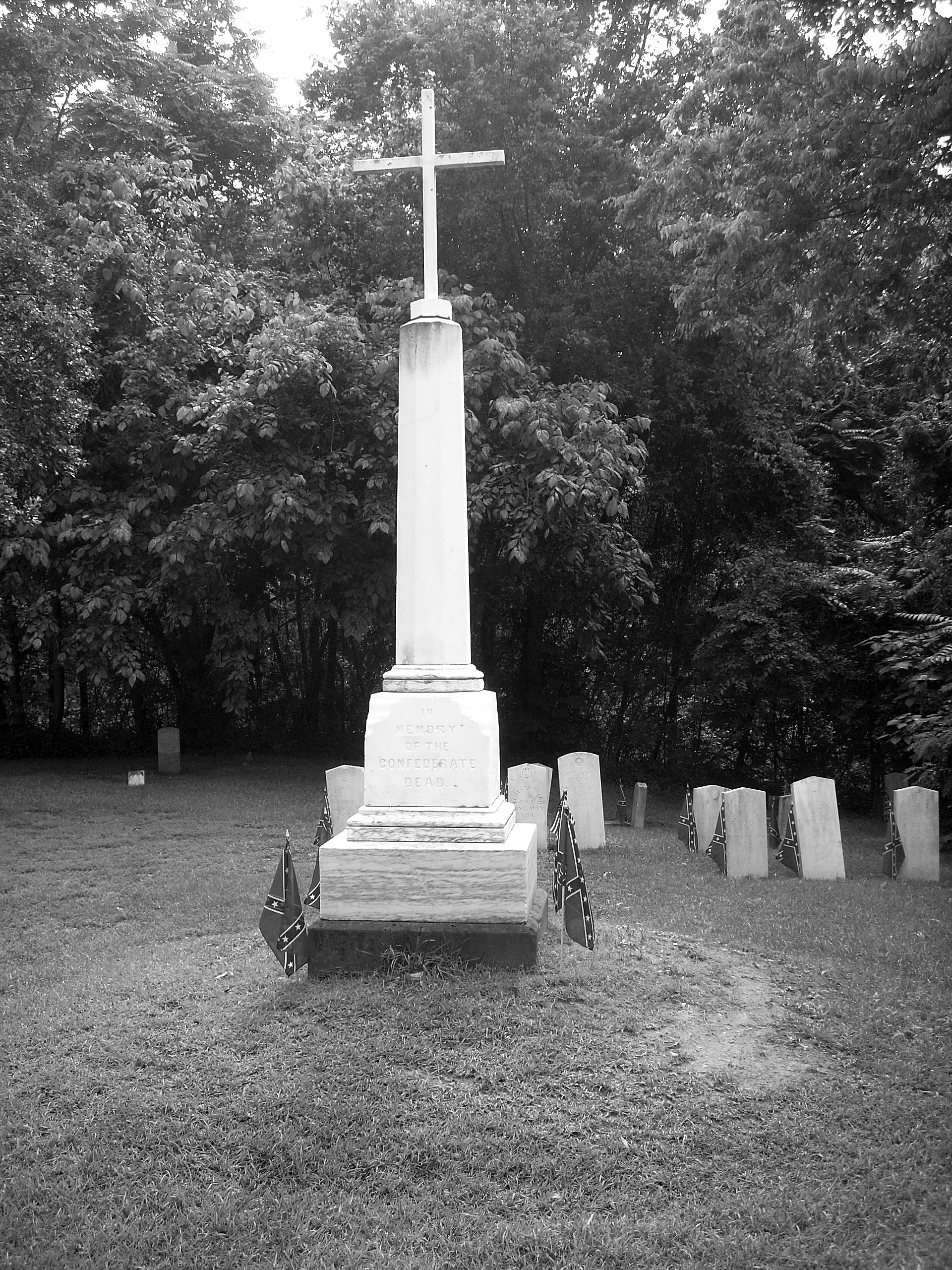
Confederate Soldiers Monument (1868) in Fayetteville

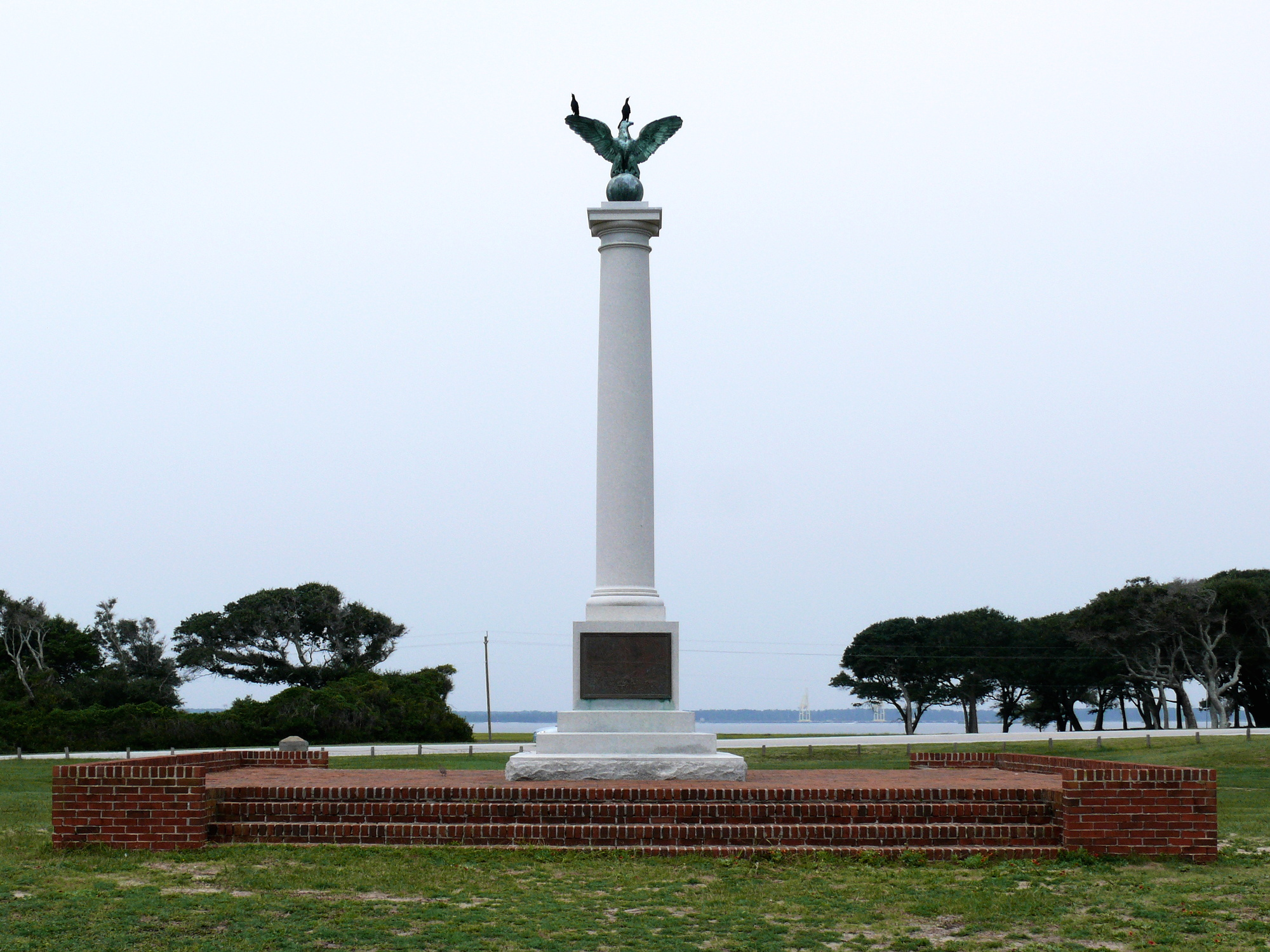
Fort Fisher Confederate Monument, Kure Beach

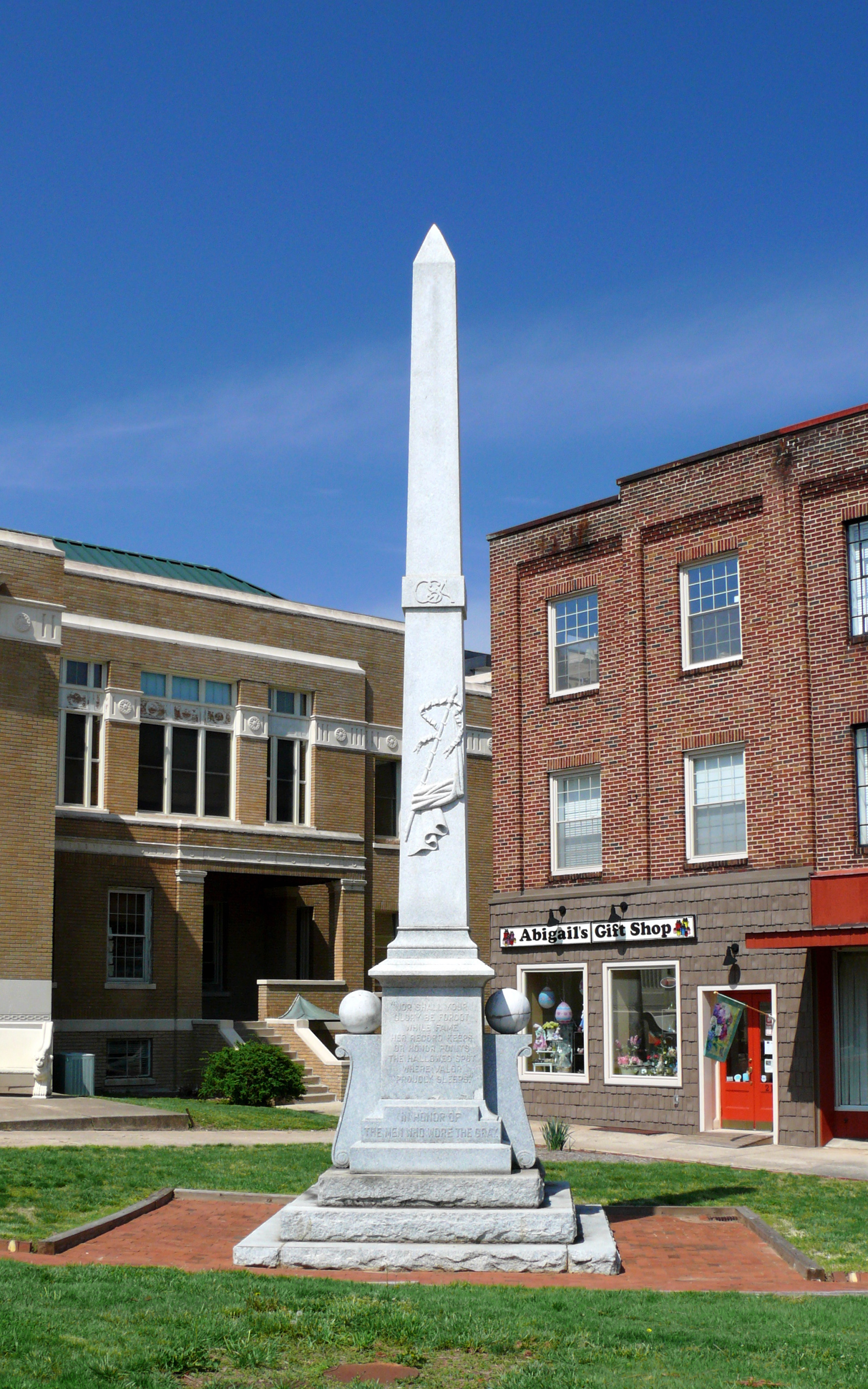
Lenoir, North Carolina

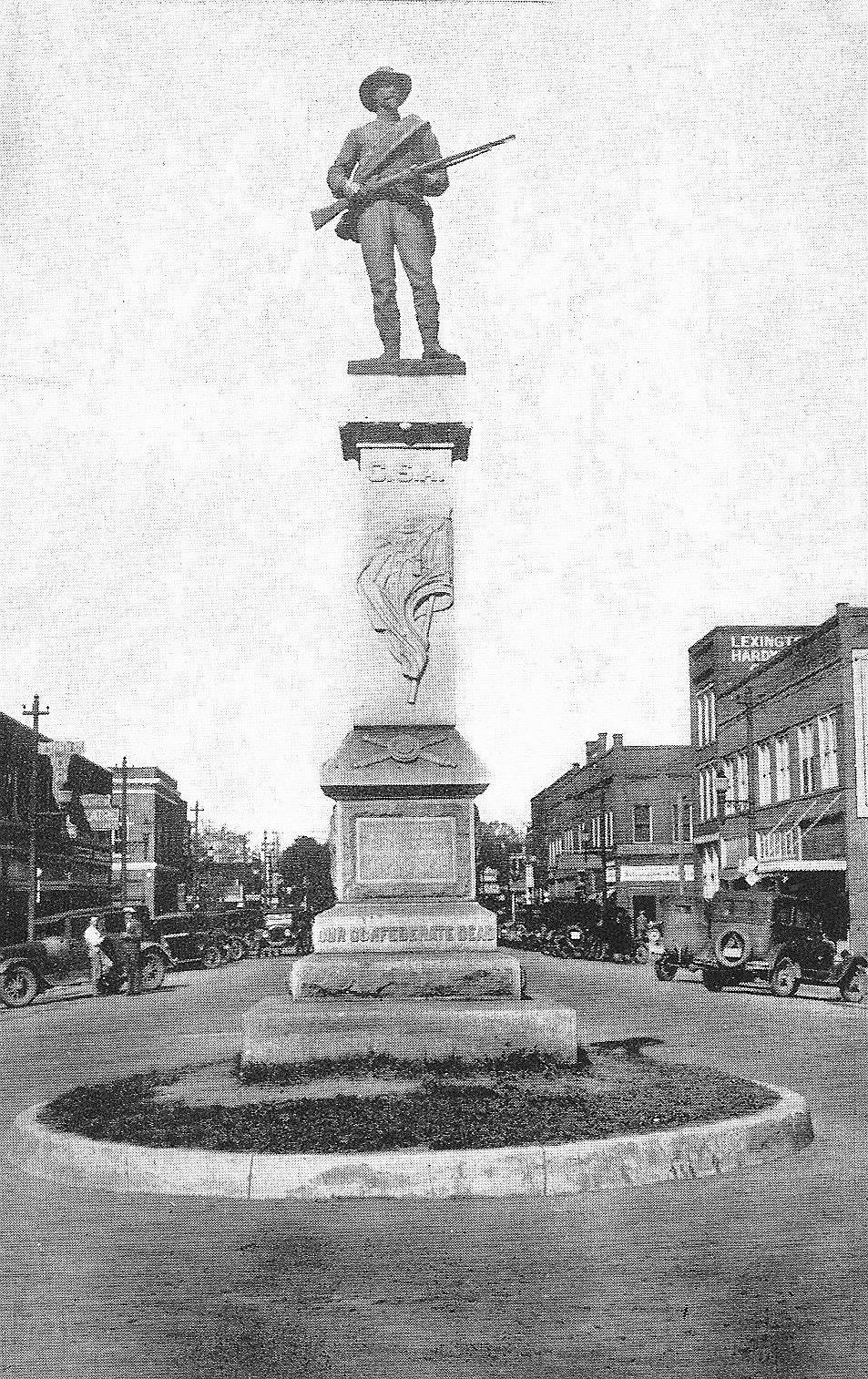
Lexington, North Carolina (ca. 1920)

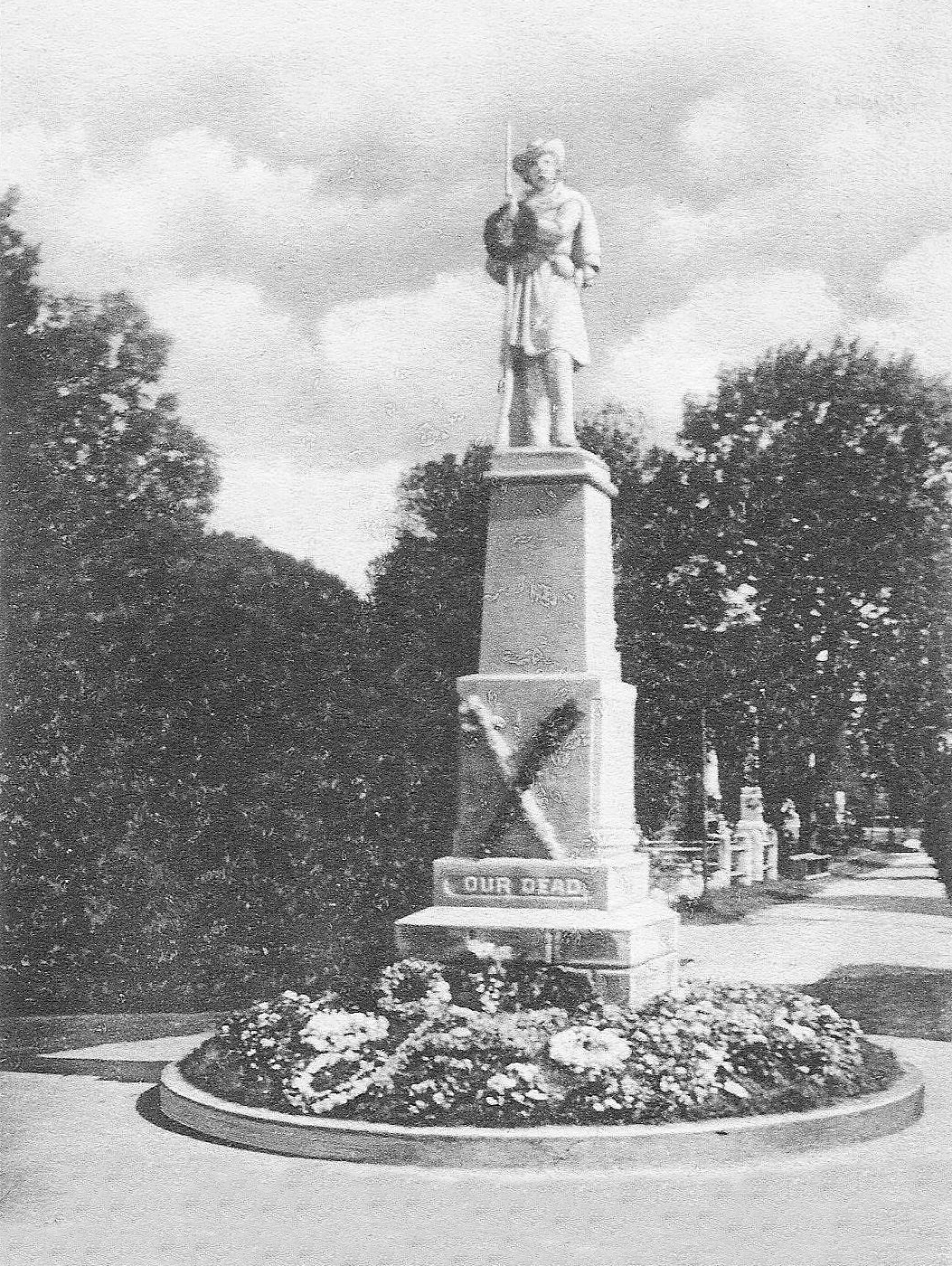
New Bern, North Carolina

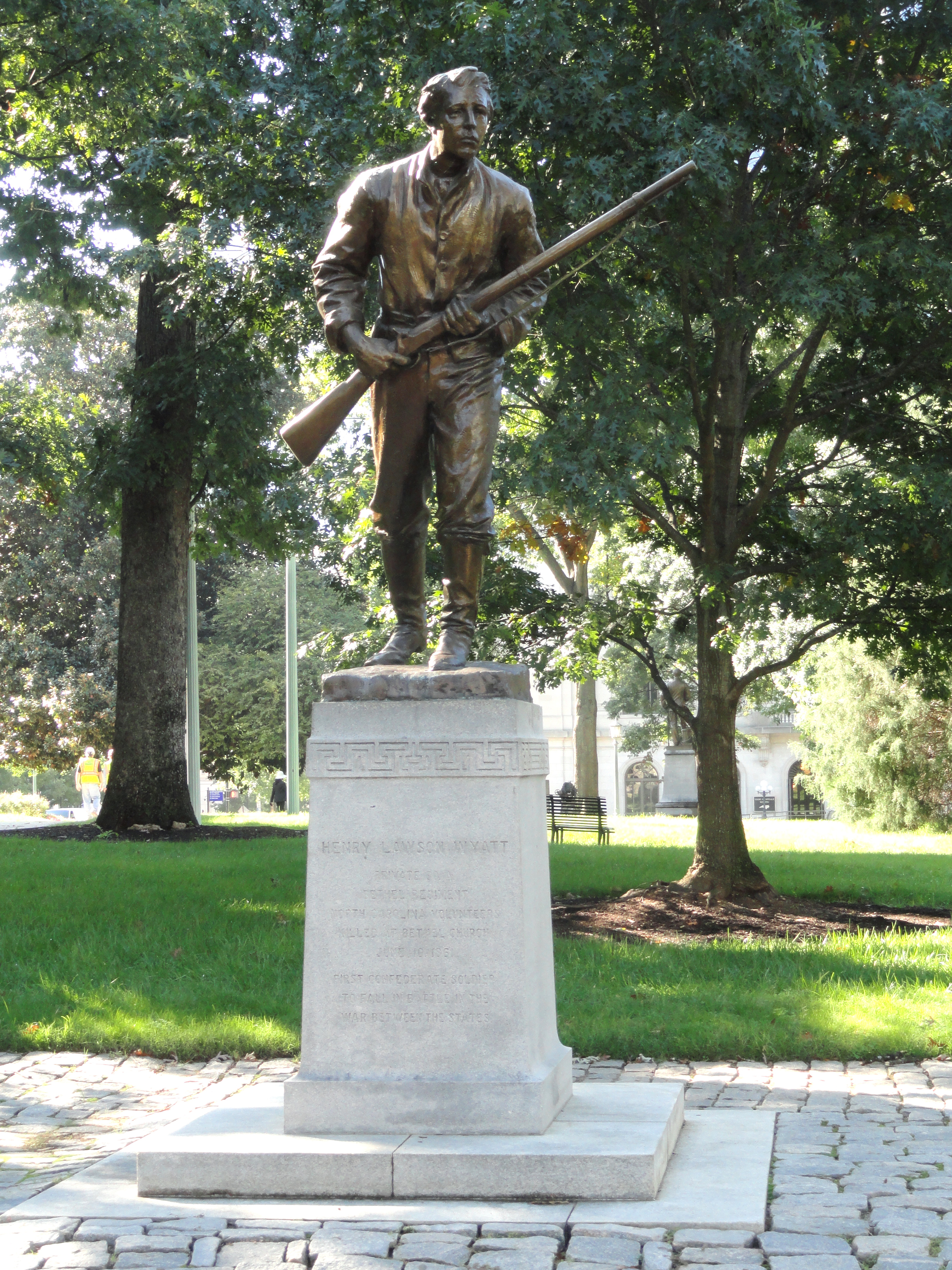
Henry Lawson Wyatt in Raleigh, North Carolina

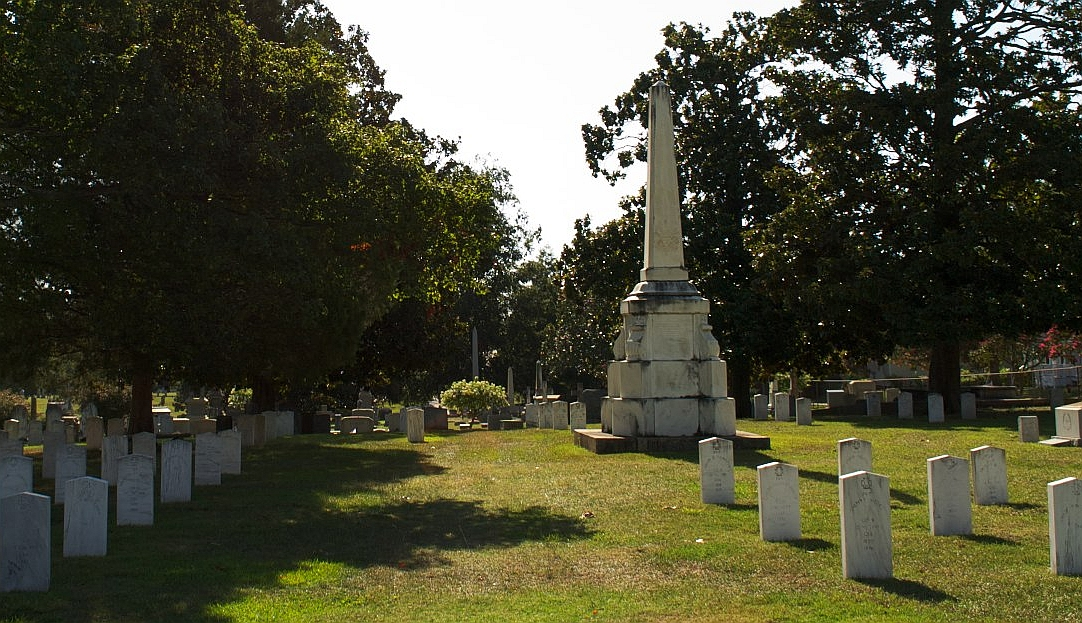
Confederate graves and monument, Historic Oakwood Cemetery, Raleigh

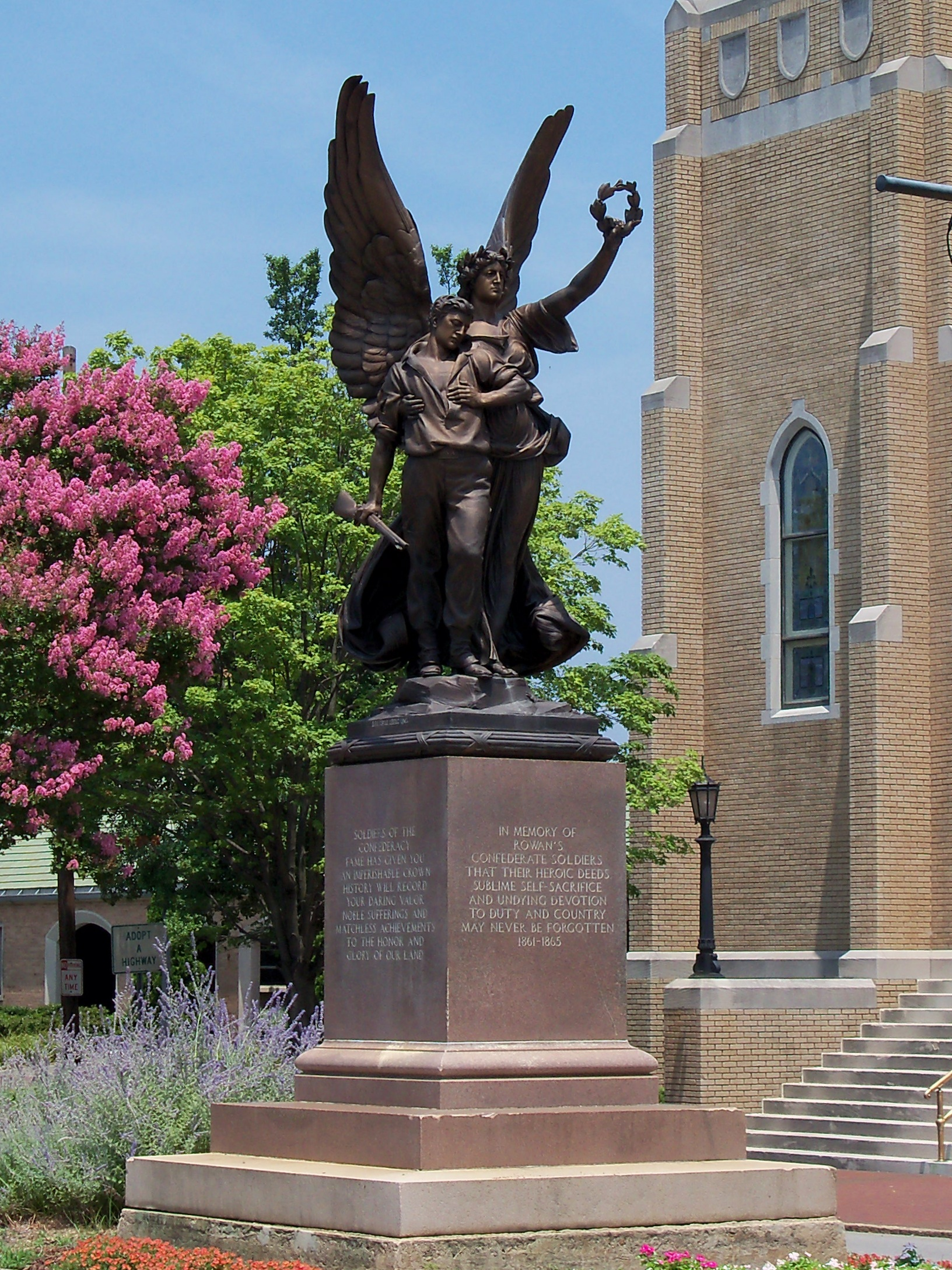
Gloria Victis, Salisbury

- Asheboro: Confederate Soldiers Monument (1911)
- Asheville: Confederate Soldiers Monument (1903), Newton Academy Cemetery
- Beaufort: Confederate Soldiers Monument (1926), Carteret County Courthouse
- Bentonville: Monuments located at the Battle of Bentonville site include:
  - Confederate Monument (1895)
  - Joseph E. Johnston Monument stands on private property near the State Operated historic site (2010)
- Unincorporated Cabarrus County, near Concord: Stonewall Jackson Youth Development Center (a correctional facility)
- Charlotte:
  - Confederate Soldiers Monument (1977)
  - Jefferson Davis Plaque (1960)
  - Last Meetings of the Confederate Cabinet Marker (1915)
  - 1929 Confederate Reunion Marker (1929). "Erected by citizens of City of Charlotte and County of Mecklenburg commemorating the 39th Confederate Reunion June 4–7, 1929." Currently (2018) protected by a glass enclosure.
  - Judah P. Benjamin Memorial "erected in His Honor by Temple Israel and Temple Beth El, the Jewish Congregations of Charlotte, as a Gift to the North Carolina Division, United Daughters of the Confederacy" (1948)
- Concord:
  - Confederate Soldiers Monument (1892)
  - Jefferson Davis Camp marker, showing where Davis "hitched his horse to a tree which stood on this spot" (1941)
- Cornelius: Confederate Soldiers Monument (1910), Mt. Zion United Methodist Church. 19600 Zion Avenue.
- Edenton: Confederate Soldiers Monument (1909); moved from courthouse in 1961
- Enfield: Confederate Soldiers Memorial (1928) at Elmwood Cemetery. Originally located in downtown Enfield, the sculpture contains a drinking fountain.
- Faison: Monument to the "Confederate Grays" 20th Regiment North Carolina State Troops (1932)
- Fayetteville:
  - Confederate Soldiers Monument (1868) at Cross Creek Cemetery; the first Confederate monument in North Carolina
  - Confederate Soldiers Monument (1902)
  - Confederate Arsenal (1928)
  - Judah P. Benjamin marker (1944)
- Fletcher:
  - Jefferson Davis marker (1931), recognizing Davis as "A Statesman with Clean Hands and Pure Heart"
  - Orren Randolph Smith marker (1930)
  - Henry Timrod marker (1930), recognizing Timrod as "Laureate of the Confederacy"
  - Matthew Fontaine Maury marker (1932). A Confederate Navy commander and slave owner, Maury investigated resettling American slaves in Brazil.
  - Robert E. Lee Dixie Highway marker (1926), "In Loving Memory of Robert E. Lee...'The Shaft Memorial and Highway Straight Attest His Worth – He Cometh to His Own'"
  - Zebulon Baird Vance marker (1928)
  - Albert Pike marker (1928), "Arkansas Poet of the Confederacy"
  - Calvary Episcopal Church Memorial (1927), "During the Civil War this Church was Used as Barracks by Confederate Troops"
- Forest City: Forest City Confederate Monument (1932)
- Franklin: Confederate Soldiers Memorial (1909)
- Gatesville: Confederate Soldiers Monument (1915)
- Goldsboro: Confederate Monument (May 10, 1883)
- Greensboro:
  - Confederate Soldiers Monument at Green Hill Cemetery (1888) (Removed July 4, 2020)
  - Confederate Soldiers Monument (1985)
  - Army of Tennessee Monument (1986)
- Halifax: General Junius Daniel marker (1929)
- Harnett County: Confederate Monument (1872) at Chicora Civil War Cemetery to soldiers killed at the Battle of Averasborough, "In Memory of our Confederate Dead Who Fell Upon That Day"
- Hendersonville: Robert E. Lee Dixie Highway Marker (1926; re-dedicated 2008)
- High Point: Confederate Monument (1899), Oakwood Cemetery
- Holly Springs: Confederate Soldiers Monument (1923)
- Jacksonville: Confederate Soldiers Monument (1957)
- Justice: Confederate Soldiers Monument (1912) at Stallings Memorial Park
- Kinston:
  - CSA Gen. Robert Hoke Monument (1920)
  - Confederate Soldiers Monument (1924)
  - CSS Neuse Confederate Ironclad Gunboat Monument
- Kure Beach:
  - Confederate Memorial (1921)
  - Fort Fisher Confederate Monument (1932); UDC monument erected at former site of Fort Fisher headquarters building
- Lenoir: Confederate Soldiers Monument (1910) in town square
- Lexington: Confederate Soldiers Monument (1905) Removed from Lexington public square in 2020.
- Louisburg:
  - Confederate Soldiers Monument (1914) to "Our Confederate Dead". The monument was formerly on the street in front of Louisburg College, but the College has grown to surround the monument. Some on campus want it removed. "It's not clear whether the town owns the statue, or whether it belongs to the county or to the quiet but still active Joseph J. Davis 537 chapter of the United Daughters of the Confederacy."
- Middletown: Confederate Soldiers war Monument (2001)
- Mocksville: Davie County War Memorial (1987)
- Monroe: Located at the Old Union County Courthouse; the obelisk (1910) was erected by the UDC Monroe chapter
- Morgantown: Confederate Soldiers Monument (1918)
- New Bern: Confederate Monument (1885), Cedar Grove Cemetery
- Oxford: Granville Gray (1909), a memorial to the Confederate Veterans of Granville County
- Raleigh:
  - See State capitol, above
  - Confederate Monument (1870), Historic Oakwood Cemetery
- Reidsville: From 1910 to 2011, the monument stood in Reidsville's downtown area. In 2011, a motorist hit the monument, shattering the granite soldier which stood atop it. Placing the monument back in the center of town sparked a debate between local officials, neighbors and friends – which resulted in it being placed at its current site – the Greenview Cemetery. The new site contains a brand new statue. The original 101-year-old statue was completely destroyed.
- Rockingham: Confederate Soldiers Monument (1930)
- Rocky Mount: Nash County Confederate Monument (1917), honoring Confederate war dead in Edgecombe County and Nash Counties; rededicated to all veterans of all wars in 1976. On June 2, 2020, the City Council of Rocky Mount voted to remove it.
- Salisbury: Gloria Victis ("Glory to the Defeated", 1891), also called Fame Confederate Monument by Frederick Ruckstull, purchased by the UDC as a Confederate monument for Salisbury, relocated 1909. Removed in 2020 and relocated 2021.
- Selma: The Last Grand Review Monument (1990)
- Stanley: Monument at Stanley Community Center and Polling Place
- Sylva: Confederate Soldiers Monument (1915)
- Tarboro:
  - Confederate Soldiers Monument (1904)
  - Henry Lawson Wyatt Memorial Fountain (1910)
- Thomasville: Thomasville and Davidson County Civil War Memorial (2010)
- Tuxedo: Robert E. Lee Dixie Highway Marker (1927)
- Washington, Virginia: Confederate Soldiers Monument (1888), Oakdale Cemetery
- Weaverville: Zebulon Vance Birthplace
- Weldon: Confederate Soldiers Monument (1908; relocated 1934)
- Wentworth: Rockingham County Confederate Monument (1998)
- Wilmington:
  - Oakdale Cemetery Confederate Mound (1872); North Carolina's first soldier statue
  - Confederate Memorial (1924-2021)
  - Confederate Monument (1932)
  - Confederate Monument (1998)
  - George Davis Statue (1909-2021)
  - Rose O'Neale Greenhow Monument
- Wilson: Confederate Monument at Maplewood Cemetery (1902)
- Windsor: Memorial to the Confederate Dead, erected in 1896 by the Confederate Veterans Associations of Bertie County
- Yanceyville: Confederate Soldiers Monument (1921), Old Caswell County Courthouse

=== Private monuments ===
- Durham: Confederate memorial, Maplewood Cemetery. A block of granite with a bronze plaque. About 40 Confederate veterans are buried at the site. Erected in 2015 by the Sons of Confederate Veterans at a cost of about $3,000. Vandalized shortly thereafter with "Black Lives Matter" and "Tear It Down". Vandalized again in April, 2019, with "cement or another hard substance" smeared on the plaque.

== Buildings ==
- Chapel Hill, two buildings at the University of North Carolina at Chapel Hill:
  - Carr Hall, named for Confederate veteran Julian Shakespeare Carr. Renamed "Student Affairs Building" in 2020.
  - Vance Hall, named for Civil War governor Zebulon Vance. There is also a portrait of Vance.
- Statesville: Governor Zebulon Vance House and Museum, where he fled after Union General Sherman captured Raleigh. Run by United Daughters of the Confederacy.

== Inhabited places ==
=== Counties ===
- Hoke County (1911), named for CSA Maj. Gen. Robert Hoke
- Lee County (1907), named for CSA Gen. Robert E. Lee
- Pender County (1875), named for CSA Gen. William Dorsey Pender
- Vance County (1881), named for CSA soldier and North Carolina governor Zebulon Baird Vance

=== Towns ===
- Carrboro (1882), named for CSA soldier and white supremacist Julian Carr
- Pelham (1868), named for CSA Col. John Pelham from Alabama
- Ramseur, (1889), formerly called Columbia and renamed for CSA general Stephen Dodson Ramseur
- Vanceboro (1876), named for Zebulon Vance
- Zebulon (1907), named for Zebulon Vance

== Natural features ==
- North Carolina Confederate Veterans Forest (1956) 125,000 spruce pine trees were planted by the UDC in the 1940s as a living memorial to North Carolina Confederate Veterans. The forest was rededicated in 2001. The area is located beneath Mt. Hardy near the Blue Ridge Parkway.

== Roads ==
- Asheville:
  - Vance Crescent Street, named for Zebulon Vance (see above)
  - Vance Gap Road,
  - Vance Place Drive
- Black Mountain
  - Vance Avenue
- Clinton: General Lee Lane
- Creedmoor:
  - N. Durham Avenue, section of US Hwy 15 called the Jefferson Davis Highway
  - Fleming Street - Founder of Creedmoor and former Confederate soldier
- Fayetteville: General Lee Avenue
- Flat Rock: Robert E. Lee Drive
- Hope Mills: Jefferson Davis Street
- Kinston: Robert E. Lee Drive
- Lexington: Confederate Street
- Mebane:
  - Beauregard Lane
  - Hill Lane
  - Pickett Lane
  - Stonewall Drive
  - Stuart Lane
- Monroe: Confederate Street
- Raleigh
  - Longstreet Drive, after Gen. James Longstreet
  - Stonewall Drive, in the Rebel Acres subdivision
  - Stuart Drive
- Salisbury:
  - Beauregard Drive
  - Confederate Avenue
  - Pickett Avenue
  - Stonewall Road
  - Stuart Street
- Sanford: Robert E. Lee Drive
- Spencer:
  - Beauregard Drive
  - Confederate Avenue
  - Pickett Avenue
  - Stonewall Road
  - Stuart Street
- Spring Lake: General Lee Street
- Stonewall: Stonewall Street
- Watha: Robert E. Lee Drive
- Wilmington: (all within the Pine Valley neighborhood)
  - Beauregard Drive
  - Bragg Drive, named for CSA Gen. Braxton Bragg
  - Breckinridge Drive, named for CSA Gen. John C. Breckinridge
  - Buckner Drive, named for CSA Brig. Gen. Simon Bolivar Buckner
  - Confederate Drive
  - Early Drive
  - Jeb Stuart Drive
  - Johnston Drive
  - Longstreet Drive
  - Merrimac Drive
  - Pemberton Drive, named for CSA officer John C. Pemberton
  - Pettigrew Drive, named for CSA Brig. Gen J. Johnston Pettigrew
  - Pickett Drive
  - Robert E. Lee Drive
  - Stonewall Jackson Drive
- Windsor: Confederate Street
- Zebulon: Vance Street

== Schools ==
- Asheville: Vance Elementary School- now Lucy S. Herring Elementary School.
- Charlotte: Zebulon B. Vance High School- now Julius L. Chambers High School.
- Henderson:
  - Kerr-Vance Academy
  - Northern Vance High School
  - Vance Charter School
  - Vance County Early College High School
  - Vance County Middle School
  - Vance County High School
  - Zeb Vance Elementary School
- Kittrell: Zeb Vance Elementary
- Raleigh:
  - North Carolina State University: In 2016 the Faculty Senate passed a resolution asking that a reference to "the winds of Dixie" be removed from the school song
  - Vance Elementary School
