= Fame (Confederate monument) =

Monument in Salisbury, North Carolina

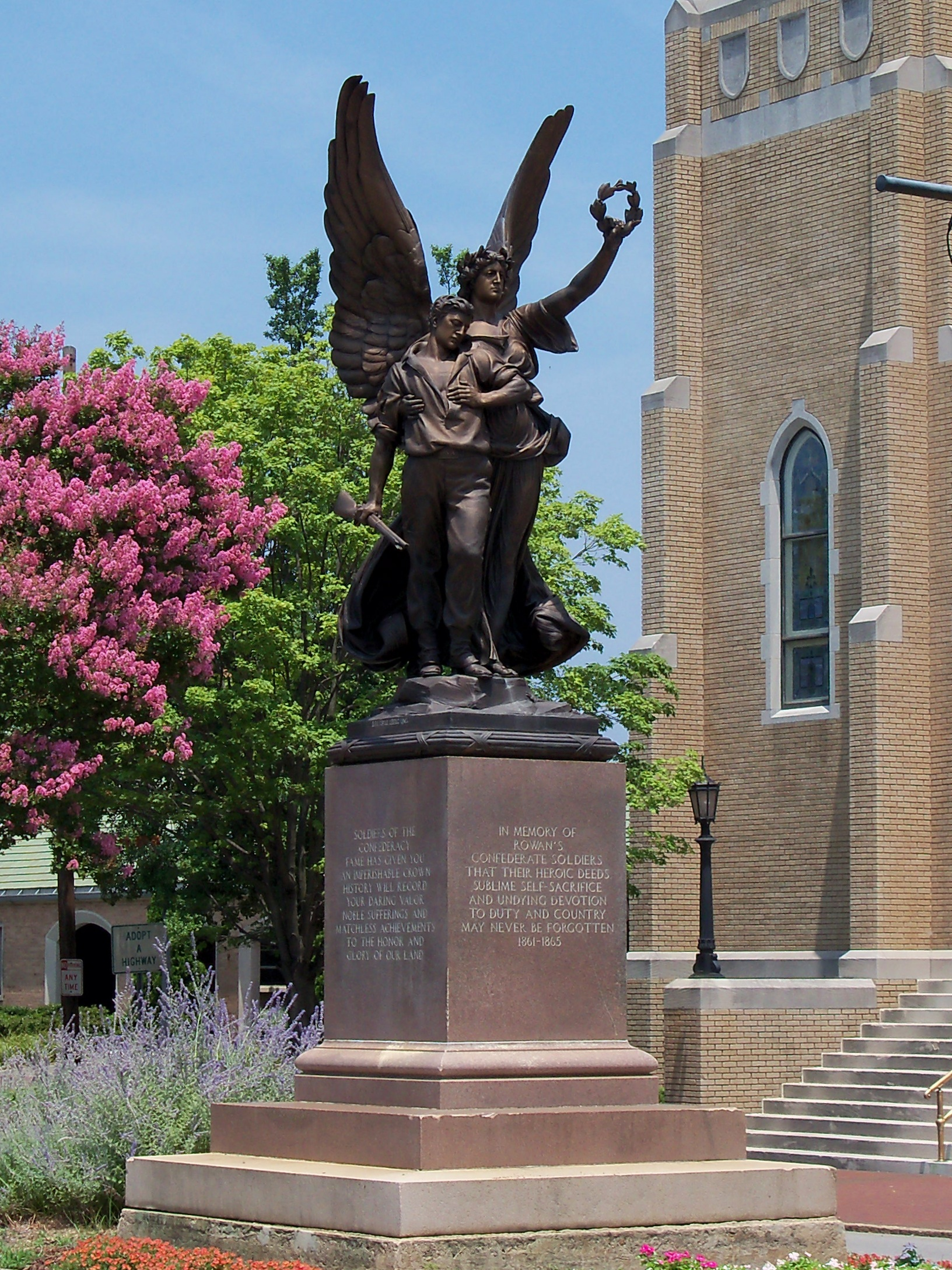
- Fame, Salisbury (location from 1909 to 2020)
- Interactive map of Fame
- Location: Salisbury, North Carolina, U.S.
- Coordinates: 35°40′12.75″N 80°27′46.56″W
- Type: Confederate Monument
- Completion date: 1891

Fame, also called Gloria Victis ("Glory to the Defeated" or "Glory to the Conquered"), is a Confederate monument in Salisbury, North Carolina. Cast in Brussels, in 1891, Fame is one of two nearly-identical sculptures by Frederick Ruckstull (the other being the Confederate Soldiers and Sailors Monument, removed from public display in Baltimore in 2017). The monument was removed from public display in Salisbury on July 6, 2020 and moved to a new location July 23, 2021.

== Description ==
23 feet (7.0 metres) "from the bottom of the pedestal", the bronze statue features an allegorical angel with outstretched wings dressed in robes with a laurel wreath on her head. In one hand she supports a dying soldier holding a battered rifle, while in her other hand—held high—she holds a second laurel wreath.

On the pink granite base created from Balfour Quarry stone from nearby Granite Quarry, an inscription says, "Deo Vindice," which can be translated "With God as our champion" or "With God as our vindicator."

The dying soldier was modeled from an 1861 photograph of Confederate Lt. Henry Howe Cook of Franklin, Tennessee.

== History ==
Gloria Victis appeared first at an exhibition in Paris, and then at a studio in a New York City, where it was purchased by the United Daughters of the Confederacy (UDC) as a Confederate monument for Salisbury. Raising the funds took about ten years. $9,000 was raised for the statue itself and $1,500 for the base.

Anna Morrison Jackson, widow of Confederate General Stonewall Jackson, attended the dedication in Salisbury along with 162 Confederate veterans on May 10, 1909, Confederate Memorial Day. Frances Fisher Tiernan read her poem Gloria Victis. At that time the statue was dedicated to 2,500 Confederate soldiers from Rowan County.

Although no minutes have been found, in 1927 A.H. Boyden said that when he was mayor, he signed a resolution in August 1908 designating the site at West Innes and Church Streets. The resolution was recorded after Boyden signed a document stating "that said site shall be used perpetually for said monument." In 1990, the DAC raised funds to restore the statue, which had to be taken to Cincinnati.

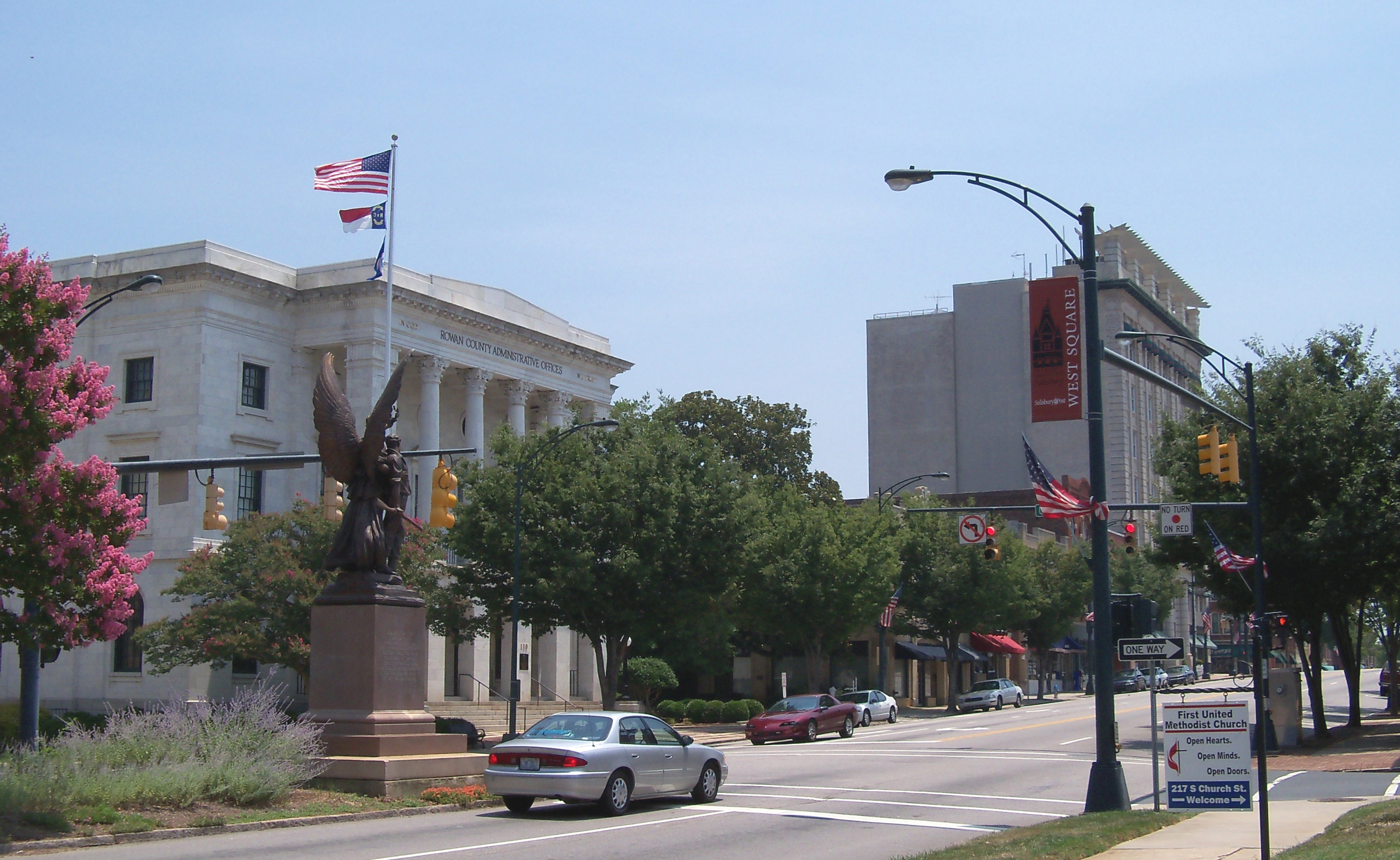
The statue in 2011

In 2015, the North Carolina General Assembly passed the Historic Artifact Management and Patriotism Act, preventing any state owned art work or memorial from being moved without permission from the North Carolina Historical Commission. Exceptions included threat to public safety and agreement between a private owner and the government. That same year the Charleston church shooting led to discussion of moving the statue.

On August 18, 2018, the monument was covered in white paint, apparently in response to the distribution of KKK flyers in black neighborhoods. On March 20, 2019 the statue was vandalized again, with yellow paint. After the 2019 incident, a public hearing was requested to discuss the possibility of moving the statue. Despite the lack of official confirmation of Boyden's action in 1908, the city was given a legal opinion that it had no authority over the land where the statue is located. City council heard from speakers in June 2019. The city attorney said the 2015 North Carolina law prevents permanently moving monuments and restricts how governments can move monuments for reasons other than safety.

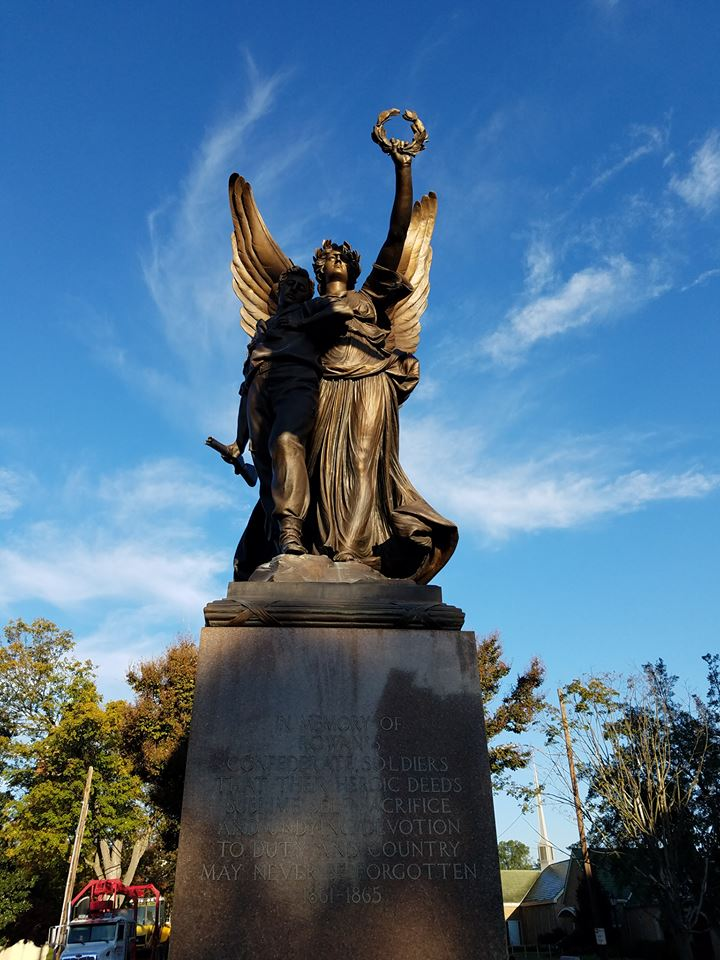
Statue at new location

Catawba College professor Gary Freeze proposed a marker near the site and new art work in the statue's original location.

More discussion about moving the statue followed shots being fired near the statue during the 2020 George Floyd protests. One commenter pointed out that it interfered with watching for traffic. Safety had been a concern in 1948, 1959 and 1964 as well.

An online petition with over 7,000 signatures as of June 12 said the statue appears to support "white supremacy and memorializes a treasonous government whose founding principle was the perpetuation and expansion of slavery." Fame Preservation Group, on the other hand, claimed the statue represents those who fought "against a federal military force invading their land" and that "it’s been made part of Salisbury’s identity." The group's petition opposing a move had 2,600 signatures as of June 12. Suggested sites were Salisbury Prison and Old Lutheran Cemetery. The city council voted June 16 to move the statue because of a threat to public safety. On June 21, the UDC signed the agreement to have the statue moved to Old Lutheran Cemetery in the 500 block of North Lee Street, where 176 Confederate soldiers have had tombstones since 1996. This location was discussed with descendants of those who raised money for the statue.

The statue was moved July 6, 2020 and transferred to its new location July 23, 2021.

The Fame Preservation Group Inc., incorporated as a nonprofit organization on November 29, 2021, received 501(c)(3) organization status in 2023. The society worked to educate people about Confederate history and about the Fame monument, and to take care of the Old Lutheran Cemetery. Group president Greg Lambeth said the group's name stands for "Faith, Ancestry, Monuments and Education".

== See also ==
- List of Confederate monuments and memorials in North Carolina
