= Vance Monument =

Landmark in Asheville, North Carolina (1898–2021)

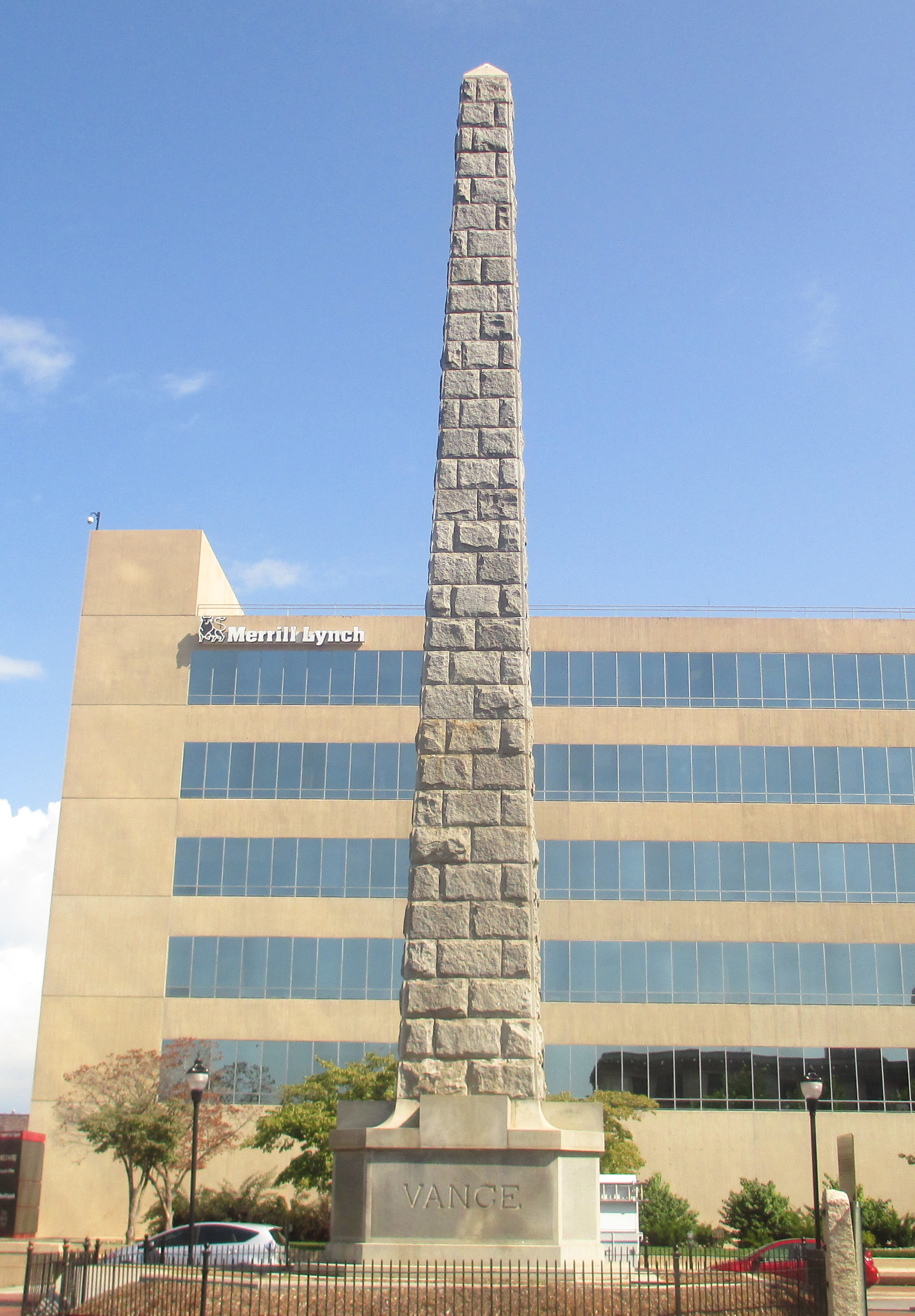
- The monument in July 2012
- Artist: Richard Sharp Smith
- Year: 1898
- Medium: Granite
- Subject: Zebulon Vance
- Dimensions: 2,300 cm × 430 cm × 430 cm (75 ft × 14 ft × 14 ft)
- Designation: National Register Historic District key structure
- Condition: Demolished, May 2021
- Location: Asheville, North Carolina, U.S.; 35°35′42″N 82°33′05″W

The Vance Monument was a late 19th-century granite obelisk in Asheville, North Carolina, that memorialized Zebulon Vance, a former North Carolina governor from the area. The monument was designed by architect Richard Sharp Smith and was an "iconic landmark" and key structure in the Downtown Asheville Historic District. Smith was the supervising architect for George W. Vanderbilt's Biltmore Estate and the leading architect of the region in the late 19th and early 20th centuries. He donated his services to design the monument, which was a project envisioned by community leaders.

The Vance Monument was mostly funded by George Willis Pack, a New Yorker who had recently moved to Asheville. Other contributors included Jewish organizations and politicians and businesses from Pennsylvania, Maryland, and Massachusetts. In addition to serving three terms as governor of North Carolina, Vance was a United States Congressman before the Civil War and a United States senator from 1880 until he died in 1894. The project's donors reflected Vance's influence and reach as both a politician and popular speaker of the era.

In the early 21st century, concerns were raised about the monument because of its association with Vance, a former slave owner. The monument was removed by the City of Asheville in May 2021.

== History ==
Zebulon Vance was a United States Congressman before the Civil War, Governor of North Carolina during and after the war, and a United States senator from 1880 until his death in 1894. He was born in a log cabin in Buncombe County, about twelve miles (19 km) south of Asheville, and later practiced law and lived in Asheville before entering politics.

=== Vance Monument Association ===
In May 1896, the Vance Monument Association was organized by George S. Powell and George Willis Pack, a New Yorker who had recently moved to Asheville from Cleveland, Ohio. Other members of the association included W. D Gwyn Esq., J. P. Kerr, John A. Nichols, Thomas Walton Patton, J. E. Rankin, and J. P. Sawyer who was its treasurer.

Chaired by Powell, the association's purpose was to raise funds and collect subscriptions or pledges to create a memorial for Vance. The association held fundraising events, including a performance of Punch Robertson Company at the Grand Opera House. Twenty volunteers under the leadership of Mrs. John M. Campbell went door to door to raise funds and sell tickets to the charity event. There was another community-wide fundraiser on July 4, 1896, at Battery Park Hill.

Pack donated $2,000, or nearly two-thirds of the $3,326 raised, equivalent to $128,716 in 2023. He made his pledge on the condition that Buncombe County would give land in front of the courthouse for a monument to Vance in perpetuity; the county promptly passed a resolution. Other contributors included Jewish organizations, Senator Mathew S. Quay of Pennsylvania, Senator Blair Lee of Maryland, Philadelphia paper firm A. G. Elliott & Company, S. Hecht Jr & Son of Baltimore, and James Logan of the Logan, Swift and Brigham Envelope Company in Worcester, Massachusetts. English-born Logan wrote, "I, too, looked upon Senator Vance as one of the large men of North Carolina. I did not always agree with him, but that is not strange. Our training was wonderfully different."

In September 1897, the Asheville Daily Citizen noted, "The fact that George W. Pack gave about two-thirds of the money for the building of the memorial to Senator Vance speaks far more eloquently in Mr. Pack's favor than it does for the people of Senator Vance's old home county of Buncombe." Contributions were also made by the Buncombe County communities of Black Mountain, French Broad, and Swannanoa.

Pack's goal for the monument was "to inspire civic pride and virtue in mountaineers". Both Pack and the association agreed that the monument should not be a statue of Vance given the limited budget. The most popular idea discussed by the association was a granite shaft on a base.

The association appointed a Ladies Auxiliary to design and care for the grounds around the monument and raise funds for the dedication ceremony. So that the association could wrap up its operations after the monument's dedication, there was a call on May 6, 1898, asking donors to pay the final $75 due from subscriptions. On May 9, all but $35 had been paid.

=== Designer selection ===
In June 1897, the association asked for bids to design "a single shaft fashioned after the Washington Monument and placed on a substantial pedestal". Designs for the monument were submitted by firms from Asheville; Atlanta, Georgia; Augusta, Georgia; Charlotte, North Carolina; Chattanooga, Tennessee; Greensboro, North Carolina; Mount Airy, North Carolina; Pacolet, South Carolina; and New England. F. M. Miles, a sculptor from Asheville, submitted two models, one of which was displayed at the A. Trifield cigar store on Patton Avenue in Asheville. The association indicated they preferred "a monument that is plain, in keeping with the plain, sturdy character of the man in whose memory it is to be erected."

More than three weeks after the deadline for design submissions, The Asheville Daily Citizen announced that Asheville artchitect Richard Sharp Smith was drawing plans for the association. On September 9, the association announced their selection of Smith, a native of England who was known for his work as the supervising architect of Biltmore Estate and had just opened a private architectural practice in Asheville. In addition to his solid reputation and local affiliation, Smith agreed to work free of charge. Smith submitted three designs to the association: the selected design in two heights—100 and 58 feet (30 and 18 m)—and a third design that was a fluted column 32 feet (9.8 m) tall. The association requested a revision of the former that was 75 feet (23 m) tall, along with completed drawings and work specifications.

=== Groundbreaking ceremony ===
The Vance Monument Association held a groundbreaking ceremony on the winter solstice, December 22, 1897, at the western head of Court Square (now called Pack Square). The cornerstone was laid in the northeast corner of the monument in a rare public Masonic ceremony by Grand Master Walter E. Moore of the North Carolina Grand Lodge. The gavel used by Moore was made for the event by George Donnan of Market Street Woodworking from locust procured at Vance's birthplace. Moore was joined on the stage by other Masons and members of the Zebulon Vance Camp of the United Confederate Veterans.

The Masonic ceremony began with a procession of seventy Masons from the Patton Avenue Lodge to the monument site in Court Square. Moore placed a copper box under the cornerstone, containing a Bible, the Charter and Code for the City of Asheville, an honor roll from the city schools, a muster roll for Vance's Rough and Ready regiment, current issues of all local newspapers including The Colored Enterprise, proceedings of North Carolina's Grand Lodge, a program for the day's event, newly minted United States coins, and a yearbook for the City of Asheville. The groundbreaking included music by the Asheville Orchestra, oration by Dr. R. R. Swope D.D., and local school children singing "The Old North State" and "America".

Asheville's Zeb Vance Democratic Club was not included in the groundbreaking ceremony, although the group offered their members as speakers for the event. In October 1897, this group had ordered 1,000 club buttons featuring a picture of Vance and the words "white supremacy" and "ZVDC".

=== Construction ===
On September 10, 1897, two days after he met with the association, Smith ran an ad in the local newspaper calling for contractors to bid on the construction of the monument. Ten bids were submitted by firms from Asheville, Atlanta, Georgia; Augusta, Georgia; Chattanooga, Tennessee; Pacolet, South Carolina; and Wilmington, North Carolina. The contract was awarded to James G. Colvin of Asheville, who bid $2,758. There was also a call for bids on granite from the Mount Airy and Salisbury quarries in North Carolina, and the quarry in Pacolet, South Carolina. Southern Railway Company offered to reduce the freight rate for shipping from the North Carolina quarries. However, J. C. Johnson of the Keystone Granite Quarry in Pacolet received the contract and had quarried the stone by mid-November 1897.

The association decided the best place for the monument was on Court Square (now Pack Square) where there was an existing water fountain. This location was approved by Asheville's Board of Aldermen and Buncombe County's Commissioners, with the fountain being removed on September 27, 1897. Lines from the Asheville Telephone Exchange that crossed court square near the proposed location were relocated to a back street.

R.M. Ramsay received the contract to dig the monument's foundation and began work on October 23, 1897. The first shovelful of dirt was thrown by John Y. Jordan, with the second by John O'Donnell. By October 28, the foundation was excavated and contractor Colvin was installing 18 inches (46 cm) of cement for the monument's foundation.

The groundbreaking ceremony of December 22, 1897, laid the monument's cornerstone. By January 6, 1898, polished granite panels for the pedestal had arrived and were being installed. However, after two panels were installed, superintendent of construction and architect Smith rejected both because the stone had a naturally occurring white line running diagonally across it. This defect was not visible until the granite was polished. Replacement stones were ordered from the Keystone Granite Quarry. The next day, the first capstone was moved from the railroad station to the construction site; it weighed over six tons and took eight mules to move it. Each stone cost more than $100, delivered. On February 4, 1898, four railroad cars of granite arrived from South Carolina, including the replacement pedestal panels.

Once the pedestal was completed, work began on placing the stone for the obelisk. Each stone block was raised by attaching it to a 100-foot-tall (30 m) derrick boom lift, using rope and chain. A team of men then used a windlass to raise the stone, one inch at a time. While using a boom to raise a capstone over the monument on February 27, 1898, one of the ropes on the block slipped and fell to the ground. Instead of having to lower the block to the ground, Will Ward, a climber with the Asheville Telephone Exchange, came to the rescue. To get a new rope lashed to the block, he climbed a distance of 100 feet (30 m) hand over hand to the peak on the monument. His climb took ten minutes and nearly ended in tragedy when he accidentally slid partway down the line provided for his descent. Ward got construction back on track, with plans to install the capstone the next day.

By March 8, 1898, only 15 feet (4.6 m) of the monument remained to be constructed. The next day several hundred people and photographers gathered at Court Square, with others at the courthouse tower, to watch the placement of the final pyramidal top stone which weighed 1,900 pounds (860 kg). The plan was to move the stone block to the top of the obelisk, and then use the derrick to raise stonemason Hugh Crawford 75 feet (23 m) to the top of the monument via a rope tied around his waist. However, as the workers were using the windlass to raise the stone, the boom started to lean slightly to the south. Once the stone was raised several feet off of the ground, it started to hang to the north like a giant plum bob. The boom "groaned and strained" and there was the sound of timbers cracking. As the crowd panicked and rushed to safety, one man tripped over an apple vendor's baskets, causing apples to roll everywhere. However, the windlass men gave enough rope to relieve the strain on the boom and safely brought the stone to the ground. They determined that the problem was caused by the breaking of a 2-inch (5 cm) board that was part of the splicing of the boom; the boom had to be lowered and re-spliced and lashed before work could continue.

As the crowd gathered the next day to watch the second attempt at placing the top stone, they stayed farther away for safety. However, the repaired boom worked and the stone was placed on the obelisk with "absolute smoothness". Throughout the entire construction process, there were no injuries.

=== Fencing and lighting ===
On July 28, 1896, George Powell, president of the Vance Monument Association, announced that the existing iron fencing in Court Plaza would be removed as part of its redesign and beautification, along with posts and cables. There was a positive reaction to this joint plan of the city and county to convert the area into a park. The Asheville Daily Citizen said this would be a shock to the "Ancient and Unhonored Order of Ever-Tireds" whose "sole occupation and chief delight" was to pose against the old fence. Apparently, the fence "drew loafers as molasses will draw flies, and caused congregations that would not assemble were otherwise".

As the monument's completion approached, the community started marking suggestions to improve the surrounding area of Court Square. One newspaper reader suggested moving the existing lighting to an artistic arrangement that focuses on the monument. In an editorial on March 15, 1898, the Asheville Daily Citizen anticipated restoration of the landscape now that construction was over:

If we are to keep the square in anything like a decent condition, the fence should be put back. One year's trial shows conclusively that the no-fence law is no good when applied to the square. The Rest Easies stand on the corners and whet off the grass, the Hurry Ups cut across the corners in order to get there a minute earlier, and the Jehus will make a cot of the greensward as they wait for patrons at the Asheville Livery Stables. Already some have picked the monument as a resting place and it has become very evident that not only will it be necessary to fence the square but that there must be a railing about the monument's base.

Three days later, on March 18, the association had a railing installed around the pedestal of the monument. On March 26, 1898, there was public excitement when a load of iron fencing was delivered to the monument. However, the fencing was delivered by mistake; it was ordered for George W. Packs' home on Merrimon Avenue.

The association also installed granite curbing around the monument square and its adjacent sidewalks to protect the grass and trees. On April 7, 1898, Smith and the committee called for contractors to supply granite curbing. The contract was again awarded to James G. Colvin of Asheville for $197. Next, the association discussed designing and adding a 2.5-foot-tall (75 cm) iron fence around the monument, set with stone posts placed four feet (1.2 m) apart. For this fence, the area around the monument had to be graded, and then would be planted with grass.

Impatient for the fence, on May 20, 1898, the Asheville Daily Citizen wrote, "It has already become quite apparent that the crowd cannot be trusted to allow the Vance monument and the square to remain in any presentable condition." The problem was that the curbing installed by the association, as well as the steps of the pedestal, was an ideal seating area. The newspaper called for the board of aldermen to install a fence around the entire area. By November 1898, the association's fence was in place; however, the newspaper noted that the fence was so low that people could easily step over it.

Shortly after World War I, Nathan Straus traveled to Asheville to lay a wreath at the Vance Monument as a "debt of gratitude" to Vance for his defense of the Jews. Straus, a Jewish philanthropist and owner of R. H. Macy & Company and Abraham & Straus department stores in New York City, paid for a suitable fence that was installed around the monument.

== Dedication ==
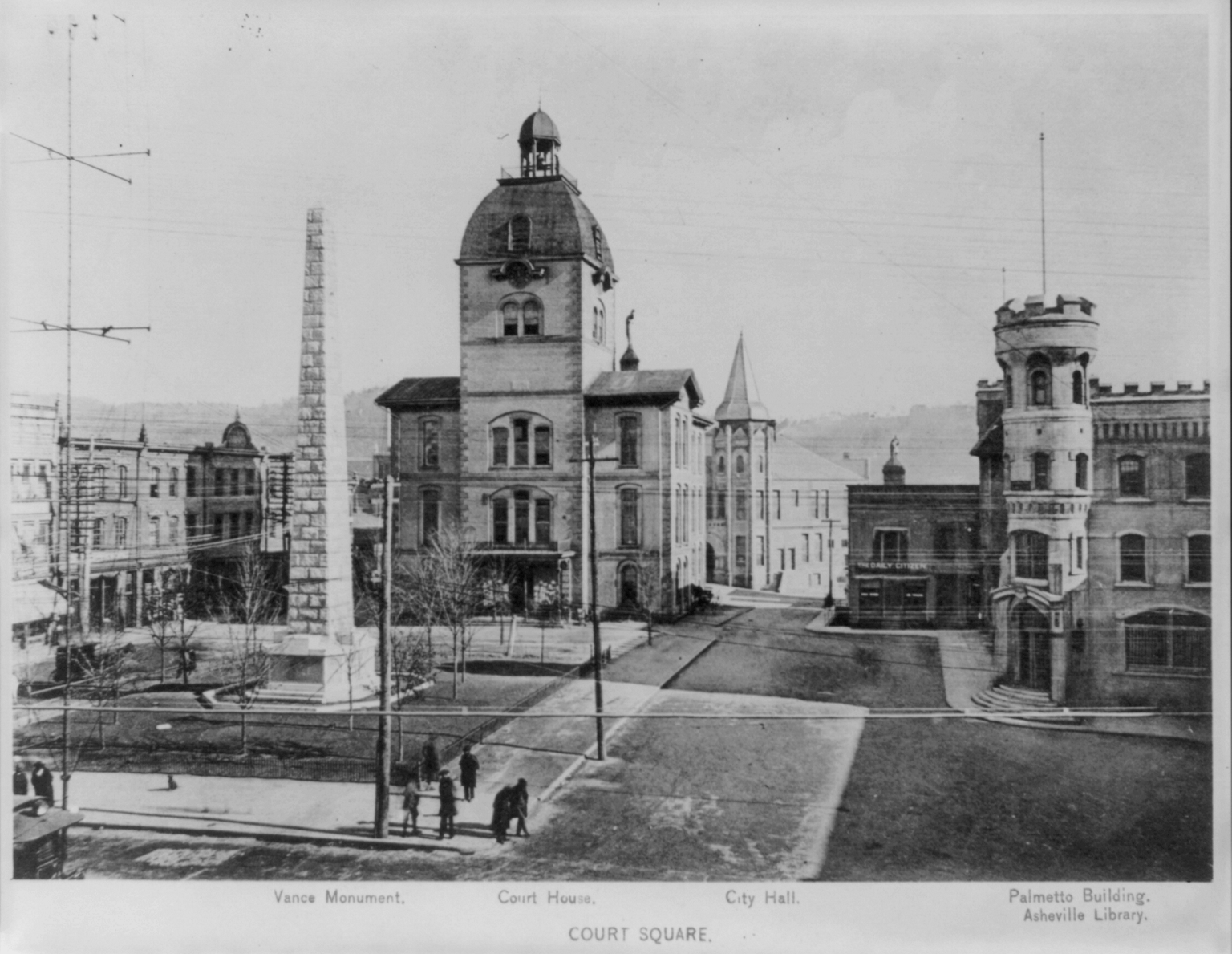
Court Square with the Vance Monument, courthouse, City Hall, Palmetto Building and Asheville Library, 1898

In February 1898, the Vance Monument Association appointed a dedication committee. Committee members included J. P. Kerr, J. A. Nichols, and J. P. Sawyer. In addition to planning the dedication ceremonies, the committee was asked to collect public suggestions. Items to be addressed included selecting the speakers and deciding whether to invite out-of-state guests. On March 11, 1898, the committee set the dedication for Memorial Day, May 10, 1898, and decided to invite Senator John W. Daniel from Virginia and Judge Robert F. Armfield from Statesville, North Carolina, to speak at the dedication. The group established a committee of related camps and organizations to collaborate for the dedication. Invitees included Judge Theodore F. Davidson, Joseph Dupuy Eggleston, Solomon Lipinsky, Colonel Virgil Stuart Lusk, Theo S. Morrison, Lieutenant J. A. Perry, Colonel James M. Ray, Major White G. Smith, R. P. Walker, and Dr. John Hey Williams. In addition, the Statesville Cornet Concert band volunteered to perform at the dedication.

On March 26, 1898, the Zebulon Vance chapter of the United Confederate Veterans voted to attend the May dedication. However, Judge Armfeld declined the invitation to give the address because of his poor health. Former congressman and mayor of Wilmington, North Carolina, Alfred Moore Waddell accepted the committee's invitation to speak, saying, "Although I have already declined several invitations for the 10th May...I accept this from your association as a duty which I have neither the right nor the inclination to refuse." However, on April 25, Waddell had to cancel because he had a conflicting date in the U.S. Court of Appeals. Nationally known orator and Governor of Tennessee, Robert Love Taylor agreed to deliver an address. Taylor wrote, "I...will be with you on that date to honor one of the greatest and best men the South as ever produced."

The committee hired Leroy Mitteldorfer of M. Mittledorfer & Son of Richmond, Virginia to decorate the Court Square buildings for the dedication. Buncombe County agreed to decorate the courthouse. A resolution was also passed, asking the citizens of Asheville to decorate their houses for dedication day. A platform was built near the monument for the dedication, and chairs were set up between the monument and the courthouse. The day before the dedication, school children were asked to bring wildflowers and evergreens to the monument to cover the unfinished ground around it. The committee also requested dogwood and evergreen boughs to cover the front of the platform. These offerings provided beautification and connected to nature which Vance loved.

As the dedication date approached, the newspaper announced the expected dignitaries and their arrival in Asheville. Included were Mrs. Zebulon Baird Vance from Washington, D. C. and Charles N. Vance, the widow and son of Vance. Guests from Marion, North Carolina included Sheriff Gardin, John McDonald, Mary E. McDonald, E. G. Neal, and Dr. James A. Sinclair. Hickory, North Carolina was represented by C. H. Cline and E. B. Menzies, and Statesville, North Carolina by T. J. Allison. Major Robert Bingham announced that he entire study body of the Bingham Military Academy would attend. Also scheduled to attend was the president of the Asheville chapter of the Daughters of the Confederacy, along with as many members as possible. The dedication committee encouraged all teachers in the area to bring their classes, saying they would be provided seating.

To enable people from across the region to attend the dedication, the Associated Railways of Virginia and the Carolinas announced that they would offer half-rate round trips to Asheville for civilians and one cent per mile traveled for military companies. This meant the round trip from Raleigh to Asheville would only cost $8.80 (equivalent to $341 in 2023).

The unveiling and dedication of the Vance Monument were on May 10, 1898. Although scheduled to start at 10 a.m., the day before the event, the association announced a delay until 3 p.m. because the guest speaker, Governor Taylor, could not catch a train to make the earlier time. As requested, many businesses were decorated for the event, and flags were everywhere. Across from the monument, W. F. Snyder's Grocery featured a large picture of Vance, surrounded by evergreens intertwined with red, white, and blue fabric. There was also a large oil portrait of Vance, painted by John A. Williams of Asheville, at the Asheville Street Railway Company's office.

The event also had media coverage. In addition to local newspapers, S. A. Cunningham and Mrs. L. B. Eperson came from Nashville, Tennessee, for Confederate Veteran magazine. Photographer C. F. Ray took pictures of the decorated storefronts and also of the monument itself. The Asheville Daily Citizen noted, "Never in Asheville has there been compressed into the square so large a number of people as gathered before 3 o'clock. Hundreds of handsomely dressed ladies, many of them students of the schools of the vicinity, added to the beauty of the assemblage." Crowds filled not only the square but the adjacent streets and sidewalks. People also watched from the windows of nearby buildings. Before the ceremony began, members of the United Confederate Veterans marched to the square from their hall on Main Street. Speakers and association representatives were seated on the platform, along with Mrs. Zebulon Vance and the mother-in-law and sister-in-law of Governor Taylor.

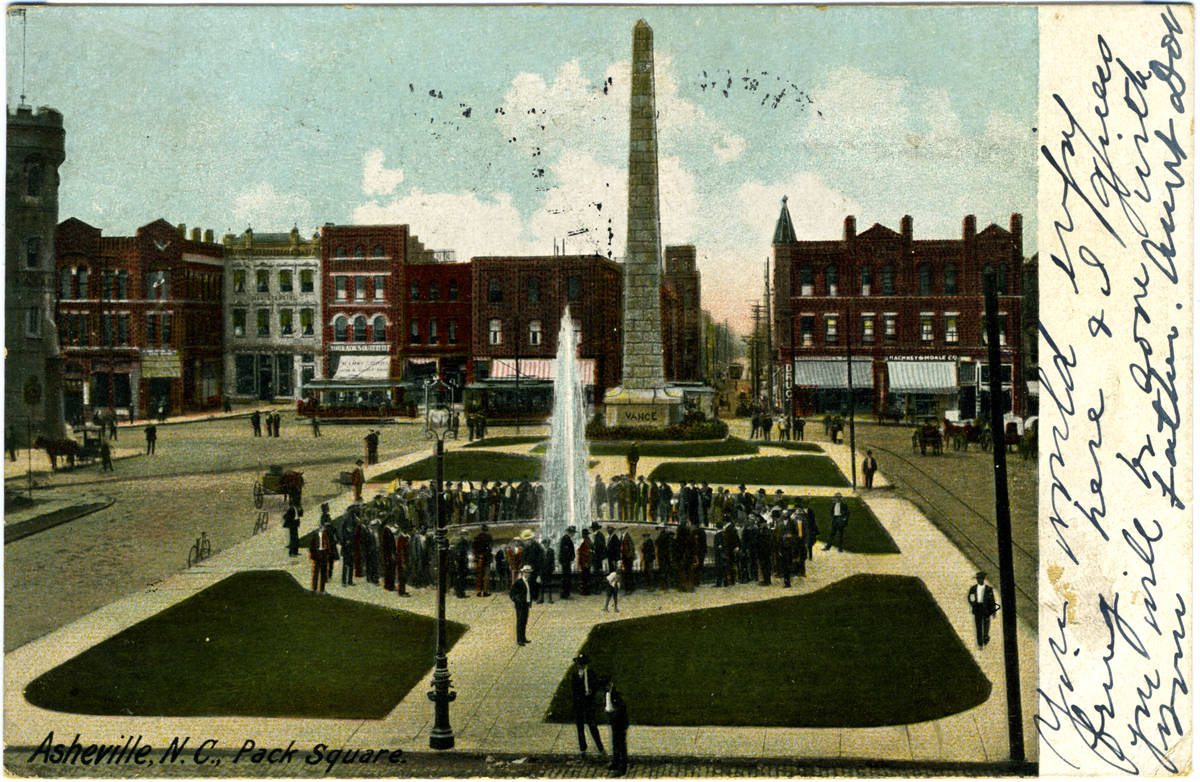
Vance Monument and Pack Square, 1906

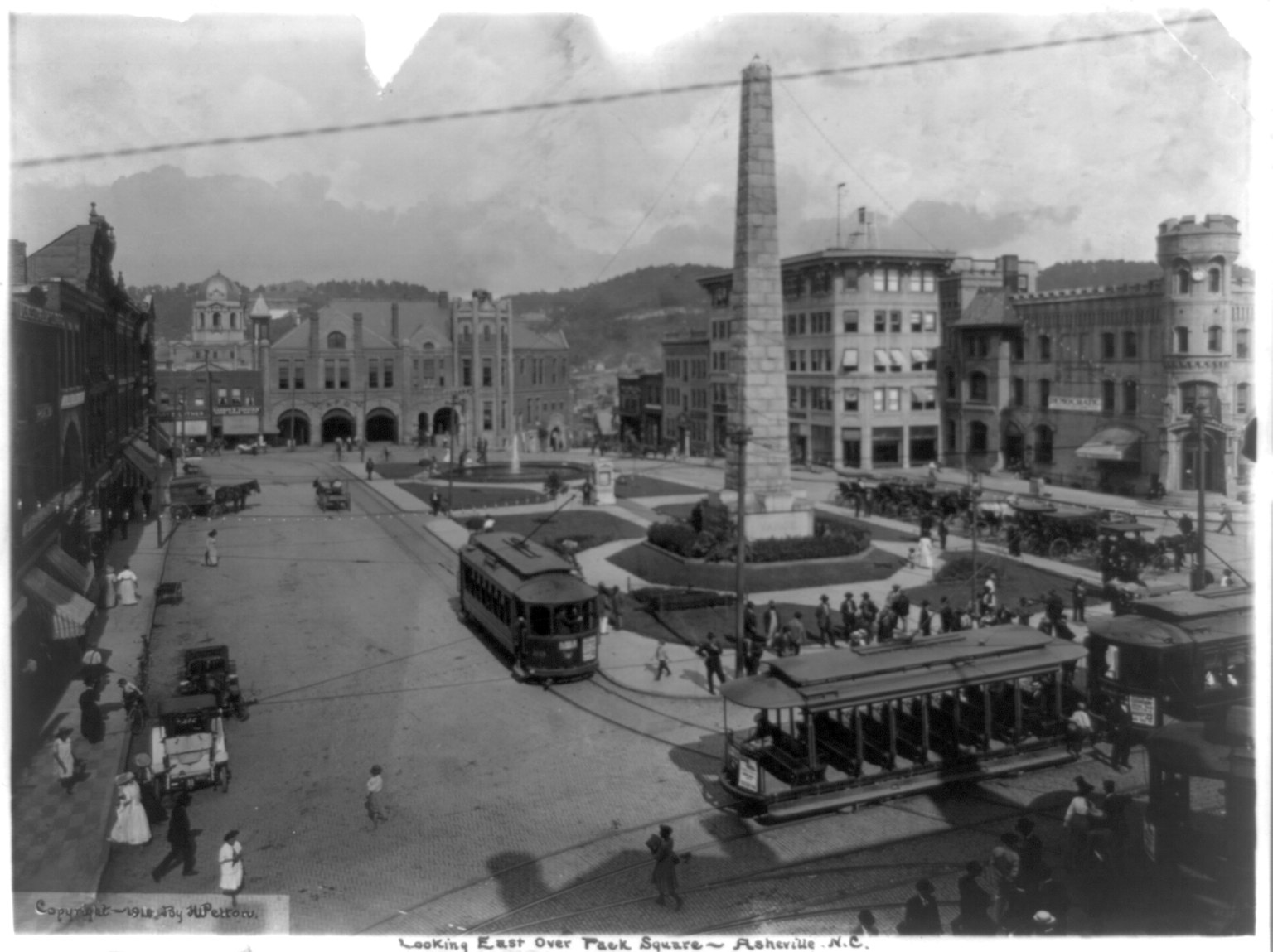
Vance Monument and Pack Square, 1910

The celebration began with music by the Asheville Concert Band, followed by a performance of the "Watch Hill" by Two-Step Kenneth. Then, the assembled crowd sang "America". Next, Rev. R. F. Campbell D.D. of First Presbyterian Church of Asheville gave the invocation, followed by the band performing "Grand America Fantasia" by Theodore Bendix, with tone pictures of the North and South. The band then played "Yankee Doodle", "Tenting on the Old Camp Ground", and "Dixie". There was a huge cheer from the crowd at the end of "Dixie". Finally, there was an address given by Governor Taylor. In his address, Taylor praised Vance's contributions to both state and nation, saying, "Through his long and brilliant career, his love of humanity never waned and his devotion for this country never cooled." He continued, "Senator Vance was a splendid thinker and statesman of rare ability, but he always looked on the bright side of things..." Taylor focused his speech on Vance's service to the United States, making only two brief references to Vance's service to the Confederacy. When Taylor stopped at 3:35 p.m., it was generally agreed that he had given "a brilliant and beautiful speech".

At some point in the ceremony, the United Daughters of the Confederacy laid a wreath of galax leaves at the base of the monument. During the dedication, the police kept carriages out of Court Plaza. In the evening after the dedication, YMCA members had a bicycle parade with decorative Japanese lanterns.

George Pack was "thoroughly satisfied" with the monument, saying, "It is simple and ragged like the man whose memory it perpetuates and the people from whom he came." The Baltimore Sun wrote, "In honoring the memory of Zebulon B. Vance the people of North Carolina have honored themselves. He was one of the greatest and most popular citizens of the old North State, and she never had a more loyal or devoted son."

=== Restoration and rededication ===
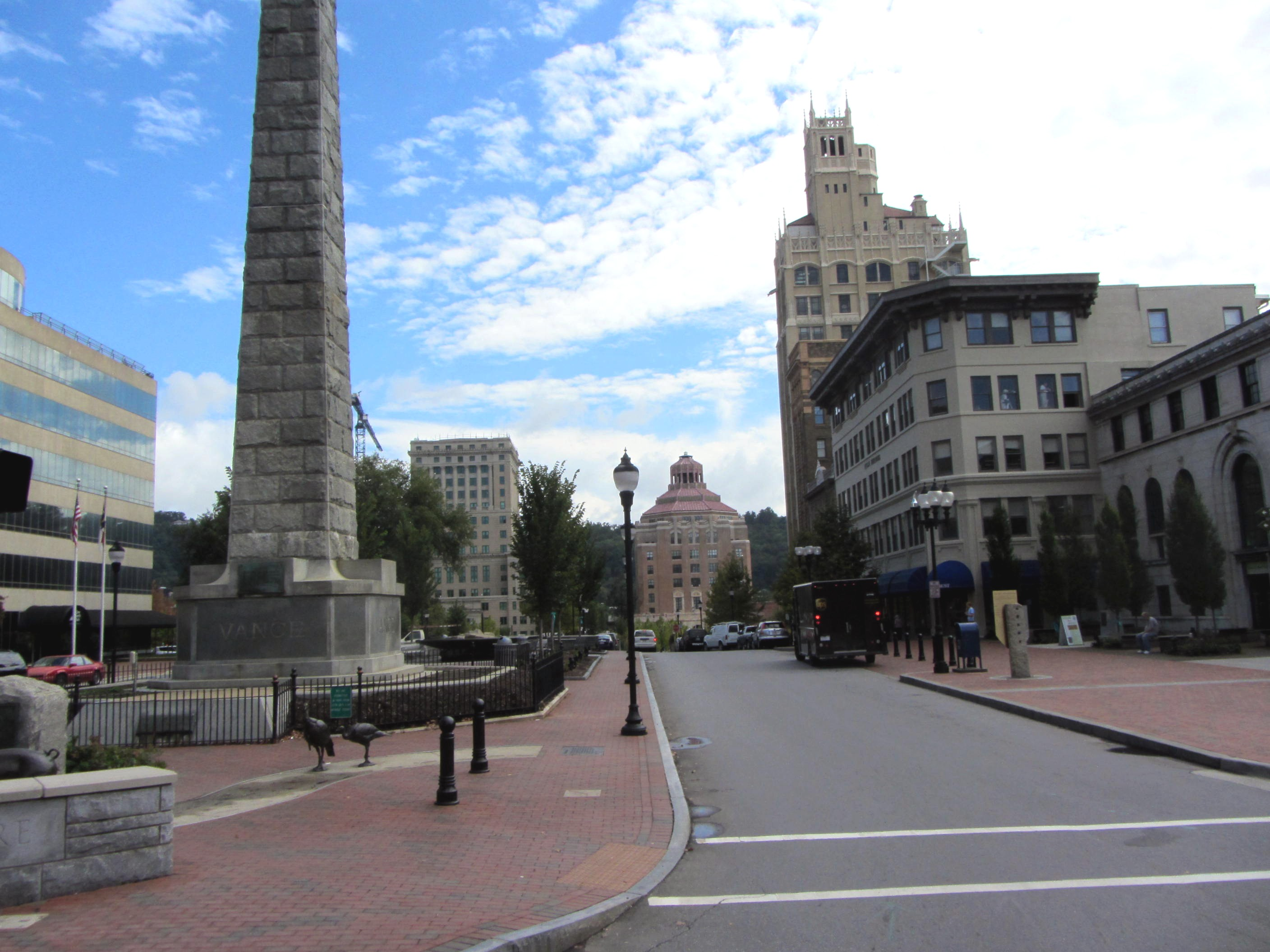
Ground level view of the Vance Monument, 2011

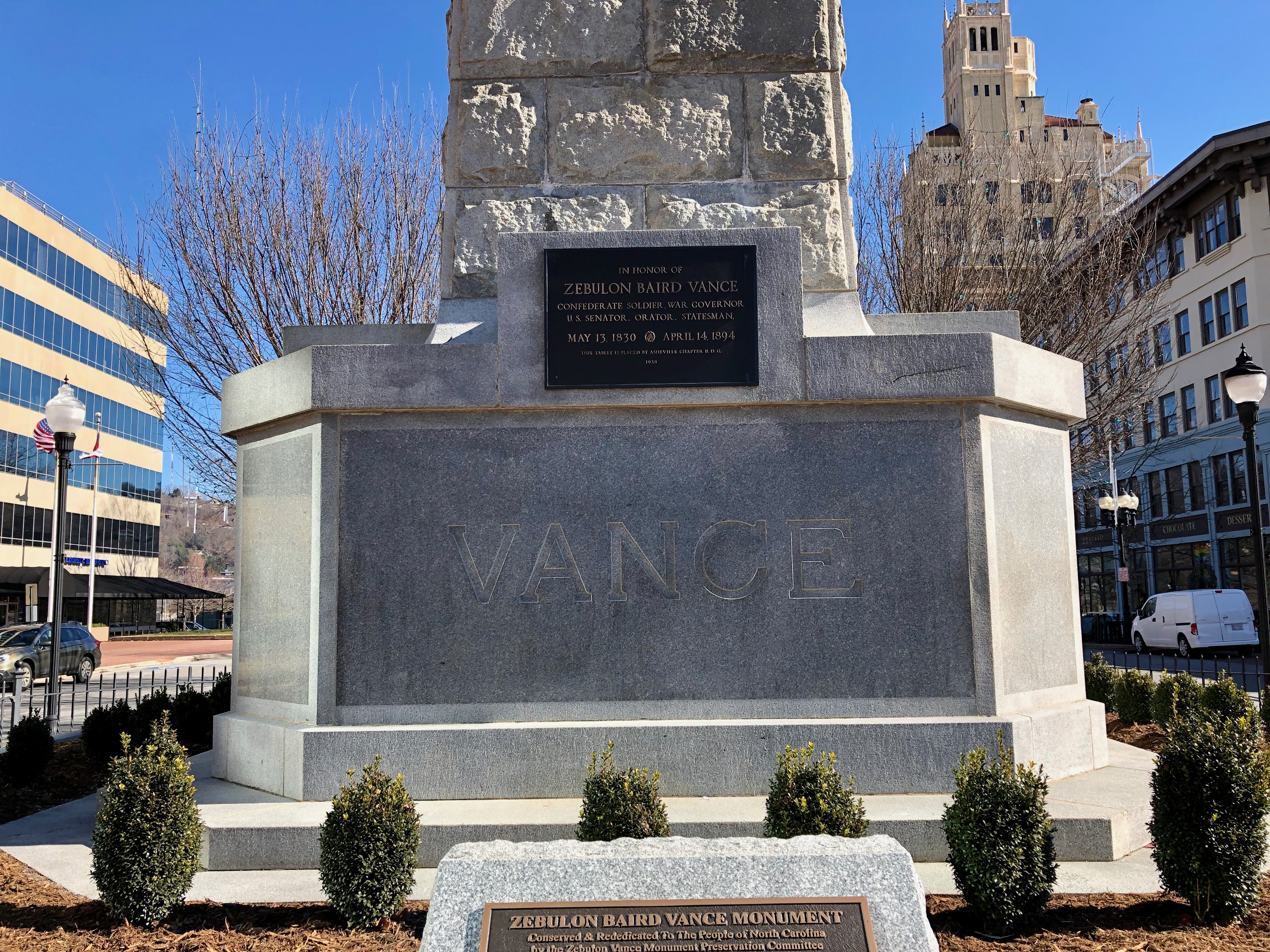
Vance Monument pedestal with UDC plaque (foreground) and rededication plaque (above pedestal), January 2019

In 2008, the City of Asheville reviewed the monument's condition, determining that it had failing mortar and corroded stone and needed to be cleaned. In 2012, the 26th North Carolina, a nonprofit Civil War re-enactment and preservation group, raised $115,000 towards the restoration. The Vetust Study Club was a major donor. In April 2015, the monument underwent its $126,000 restoration (equivalent to $169,785 in 2023), with the city contributing the difference of $11,000. Repairs took four weeks and involved scaffolding around the monument and temporary construction fence. Restoration was undertaken by a professional conservator.

As part of the restoration, plans were made to remove the copper box placed under the cornerstone by the Masons in the 1897 groundbreaking ceremony. On March 30, 2015, workers attempted to remove the Masons' time capsule in preparation for their work but had to break the side of the box because the cornerstone had shifted over time. The crew used this extreme tactic because the restoration work included cleaning the stone and mortar with water, which would have damaged the box and its contents. The contents were removed and restored by staff from the Western Office of the North Carolina Department of Cultural Resources. Heather South, archivist with Cultural Resources, indicated that the contents would probably require a significant amount of conservation work given that it was buried for more than 100 years. One important discovery was the enclosed issue of the Colored Enterprise newspaper, because no other known copy of this African American newspaper from Asheville survives.

On June 6, 2015, there was a rededication ceremony where another bronze plaque was placed on a small sloped granite block in front of the west face of the monument. The plaque was dated May 15, 2015, and listed the names of the donors to the restoration project. On September 18, 2015, a new time capsule was placed at the monument, to be opened in 2115. The new copper time capsule included some items from the 1897 time capsule, along with new additions, including a document signed by 1,000 residents of Asheville.

== Description ==
Richard Sharp Smith's design for the Vance Monument was based on the Washington Monument. It was a 66-foot-tall (20 m) graduated obelisk built from brick and covered with granite blocks. The granite blocks were one foot (30 cm) thick and from two to three feet (60 to 90 cm) deep, and were set with LaForge mortar. The stone was pitch-faced or rough-cast except for a 2.5-inch-wide (6 cm) vertical margin line that ran the length of the four corners of the obelisk. The interior brick was of an extra hard-burnt variety. Smith suggested the brick core because it reduced construction costs and allowed the association to build a taller monument. The granite was anchored to the brick with galvanized iron clamps.

The obelisk was constructed on top of a 14-foot (4.3 m) square pedestal base. The pedestal was 9 feet (2.7 m) tall and had chamfered corners. On each of the pedestal's four sides, there was a polished panel that was 4 feet 4 inches by 9 feet 0 inches (1.32 by 2.74 m), weighing nearly 8,000 pounds (3,600 kg). The pedestal also had an additional 5 feet (1.5 m) of foundation that was sunk into the ground and anchored with Portland cement. On the south corner block it read: "DEC. 22 A.L. 5897 / WALTER E. MOORE / GRAND MASTER."

With the obelisk and its pedestal combined, the Vance Monument was 75 feet (23 m) tall. At the time, the monument was "towering", the tallest structure in Asheville, and was meant to be seen from a distance. The only indication that the monument was for Vance was the single word "VANCE" engraved into the polished panel on each side of the pedestal. Local history columnist and librarian Rob Neufeld noted that it is one of few Civil War monuments in the South with abstract form, arguing, "The fact that it is not of a person, a soldier, a horse, or some kind of object that symbolized the war is significant. It is not, therefore, a symbol of slavery in the South; it's a monument to honor Vance."

The pedestal had a railing at its bottom step and was surrounded by a low, 2.5-foot-tall (75 cm) simple iron fence with supporting stone posts spaced at 4-foot (1.2 m) intervals. Shortly after World War I, a taller fence iron fence was installed.

Forty years later, the Asheville Chapter of the United Daughters of the Confederacy added a plaque to the monument, along with the support of the American Legion and B'nai B'rith. The plaque read:

ZEBULON BAIRD VANCE
CONFEDERATE SOLDIER, WAR GOVERNOR
U.S. SENATOR, ORATOR, STATESMAN
MAY 13, 1830 – APRIL 14, 1894
THIS TABLET IS PLACED BY ASHEVILLE CHAPTER U.D.C.
1938

== Initial reactions ==
Two months before the dedication of the Vance Monument, it was already making its way into jokes in the local newspaper. On March 7, 1898, the Asheville Daily Citizen wrote, "It is easily apparent that an army of Rest-Easies has its eyes on the steps at the base of the Vance monument as a place of reclining during the summer months. It is feared that a number of them will be suffering from crick on the neck if the monument is not completed soon." On March 22, the newspaper reported, "A reader of the Citizen suggests that in order to make the steps of the Vance monument as comfortable as possible for the Sons of Rest they ought to be cushioned."

On March 9, 1898, the newspaper made a political joke that referenced the monument: "If the President wishes to retire Secretary Sherman and wants a man for his place that has a backbone as rigid as the Vance monument, there is Richmond Olney."

The Colored Enterprise told a humorous story about the crowds watching the construction of the Vance Monument. As the capstone was being raised, Rev. Rice of Rock Hill Baptist Church was talking to one of his Baptist brethren when a pint of corn liquor dropped to the pavement. Apparently, the smell caused quite a stir in the crowd and a great deal of embarrassment for the man. Rev. Rice said "he never felt so bad for a man in his life", especially as the man in question "always sits high in the 'amen corner' of the church." The paper noted that the corn liquor "was doubtless intended for sprains and bruises".

W. B. Williamson & Co. Furniture and Carpet House ran several advertisements in the Asheville Daily Citizen newspaper saying, "The unveiling of the Vance Monument can scarcely attract more people than the unpacking of the many new patterns of furniture, carpets, mattings, etc."

In November 1898, the Asheville Daily Citizen joked about the association's low fence around the monument, saying, "The fence can easily be straddled, and the folks who loaf about the square will think it delightful to step over it and make their way to the base of the monument, there to bask in the sun and save coal. About the only way to keep the crowd out is to put up a 10' fence, cover the top with spikes, and keep a half dozen policemen on the inside."

Annually on or about May 13, Vance's birthday, members of the local chapter of the Daughters of the Confederacy and the local chapter of B'nai B'rith, a Jewish service group, came together to lay a wreath at the monument. According to tradition, a member of B'nai B'rith was present for the monument's dedication when the United Daughters of the Confederacy laid the first wreath at its base. The wreath always includes leaves of the native plant galax which is supposed to have healing powers. Henry Meyers, former B'nai B'rith state chairman, spoke at the event almost every year until his death.

Steve Rasmussen dubbed the monument "Asheville Monument to Tolerance", in 2003, citing Vance's extensive oration on behalf of Jews. Rasmussen wrote, "The Vance Monument is more than just a shrine to a Civil War-era governor; more, even, than a forum for Asheville's remarkably diverse political views. Ever since the winter solstice day in 1897 when its cornerstone was laid...to honor the Confederate Christian who stood up for the Jews, the monument has symbolized the most controversial of First Amendment rights: freedom of religion."

In 2017, author and historian Keith Essig suggested renaming it the Advance Monument. He said this name would recall The Advance, an African American newspaper published by Edward Stephens in the 1890s. Stephens was a founder of the Young Man's Institute in Asheville, as well as an administrator for Asheville's black schools during segregation.

In August 2020, Sean Devereaux made a suggestion to turn the Vance Monument into a giant tennis racket. His rationale was that Vance owned slaves; Asheville was named for Samuel Ashe who owned an entire plantation of slaves; and professional tennis player Arthur Ashe's family traces back to enslavement with Samuel Ashe. Devereaux suggested changing Asheville's namesake to Arthur Ashe, and at the same time, turning the monument into a tennis racket shaft to honor Ashe.

== 21st-century reactions ==
Zebulon Vance was a slave owner and held racist attitudes toward African Americans. Kerby Price, a historic interpreter at the Vance Birthplace State Historic Site says, "Vance, born in 1830, remains one of North Carolina's most noteworthy politicians. He also owned [six] slaves. During his nearly 40 years of leadership, the statesman never publicly denounced the practice." As a member of the U.S. Congress in March 1860, Vance said, "Plainly and unequivocally, common sense says keep the slave where he is now—in servitude. The interest of the slave himself imperatively demands it. The interest of the master, of the United States, of the world, nay of humanity itself, says, keep the slave in his bondage; treat him humanely, teach him Christianity, care for him in sickness and old age, and make his bondage light as may be; but above all, keep him a slave and in strict subordination; for that is his normal condition; the one in which alone he can promote the interest of himself or of his fellows."

=== African American Heritage Commission ===
The North Carolina General Assembly created the African American Heritage Commission (AAHC) in 2008. In 2014, the commission began considering the creation of a monument for African Americans in Asheville to provide balance for the Vance Monument. One idea from the AAHC was to contextualize the Vance Monument. Sasha Mitchell, AAHC chair, said they wanted to add a series of small markers in the monument square to tell the story of Asheville's African Americans. Mitchel said, "To be perfectly honest, I wish it [the Vance Monument] wasn't there. But it is there and moving it would be very expensive. As far as putting money into moving it rather than for contextualizing it, I don't know that that would be the wisest use of money."

A coalition of community activists—including the Center for Diversity Education, Carolina Jews for Justice, Masonic Lodge Venus No. 62, the Interdenominational Ministerial Alliance, and the Mountain's People Assembly—backed the AAHC and called upon Asheville's Public Art Board to create a new work near the Vance Monument to recognize African American history. The group started a Change.org petition that read, "It was at this site where enslaved people were sold and had bills of sale recorded. In addition, enslaved people were punished and imprisoned at this same site, yet no marker of any kind acknowledges this or the many contributions African-Americans made to this region." The petition referenced the site of a prior courthouse that was close to the Vance Monument, as well as the former jail which was on top of the monument's site.

The AAHC made its recommendations to the city and also submitted the petition with 2,000 signatures. However, no action was taken by the city. When no progress was made, Mitchell stated his belief that regulations and staff support got in the way. On June 23, 2015, the Vance Monument was marked with spray paint, with "Black Lives Matter" being painted on the monument's nameplate. The paint was removed and no arrests were made. After the 2017 Unite the Right rally in Charlottesville, Virginia, Asheville created a subcommittee to study what to do with its Confederate markers and monuments, including the Vance Monument. However, those efforts went nowhere.

=== George Floyd protests ===
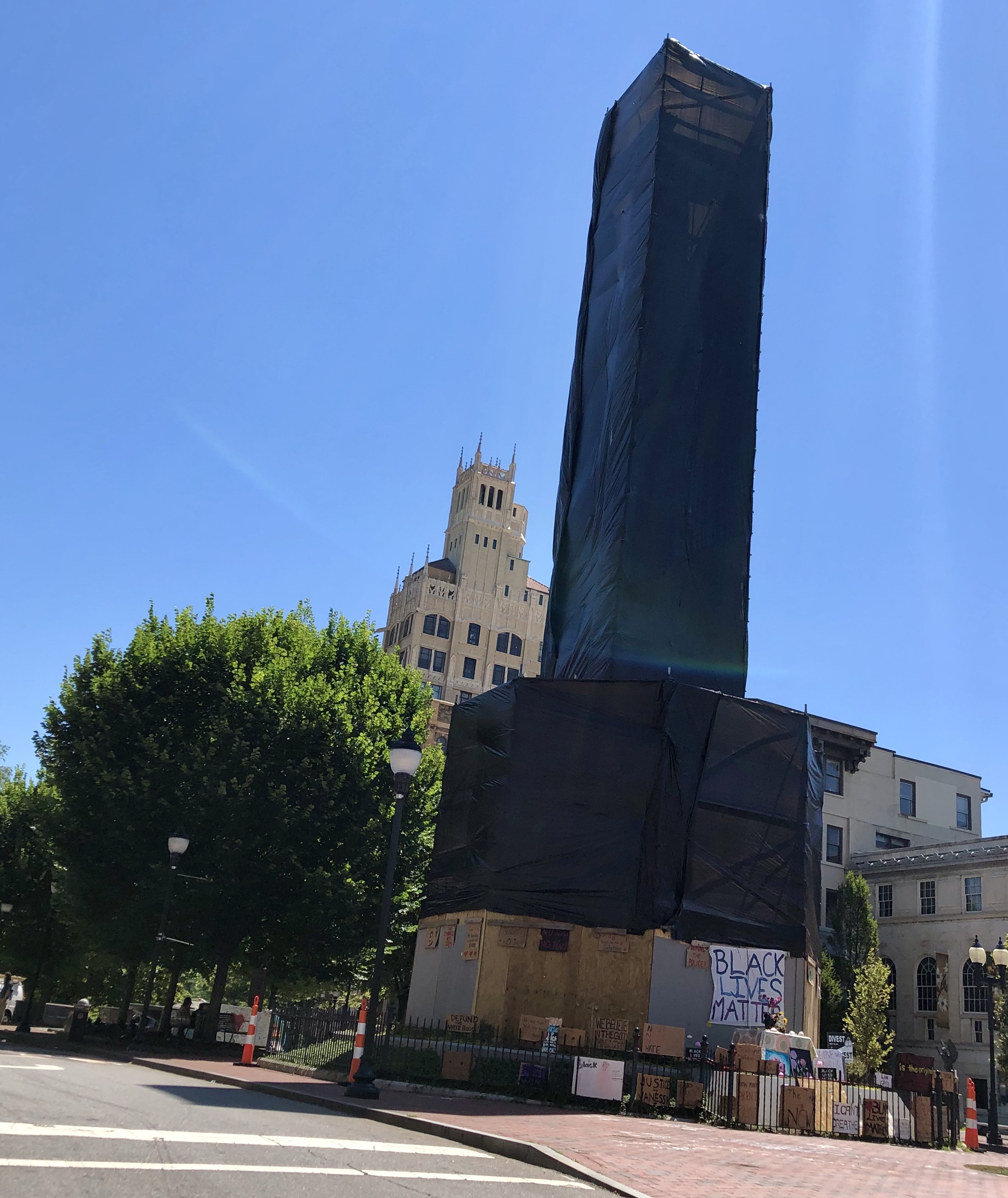
Vance Monument shrouded, July 2020

Over several nights in late May and early June 2020, Asheville residents gathered by the Vance Monument in Pack Square to protest the murder of George Floyd by a police officer in Minneapolis on May 25, 2020. Protesters marked the monument's pedestal with spray paint. The nationwide and worldwide George Floyd protests called for social justice, including the removal of monuments to the Civil War and racists. Local newspaper reporter John Boyle wrote, "The killing of Minneapolis resident George Floyd under the knee of police officer Derek Chauvin...changed everything in America, though, including our quaint mountain city's assessment of its most visible monument." One June 5, peaceful protestors used a wall in the monument square to create an altar, covered with photographs of victims of police brutality.

On July 8, 2020, city workers began the process of covering the monument "in order to reduce its impact on the community and to reduce the risk of harm it presents in its current state". This action resulted from a joint resolution passed by the Asheville and Buncombe County. The cost was $18,500, plus $2,600 a month to rent scaffolding. Boyle noted, "It really looks like someone draped a giant plastic leaf bag over the obelisk and cinched it up real tight. It simultaneously piques your curiosity and makes you recoil at its ugliness."

On July 29, Change.org and the George Floyd Foundation temporarily replaced Vance Monument with a projected image of George Floyd. This was part of a national tour, following the Freedom Riders' route, in Floyd's memory. The goal of the week-long hologram installation was to transform spaces with racist Confederation symbols into places of solidarity, hope, and forward-thinking change.

=== Bombing attempt ===
On July 4, 2022, a woman attending the city's Independence Day fireworks show reported overhearing a man talk about blowing up the remains of the Vance Monument. Just after 11 p.m., a loud explosion was heard throughout downtown Asheville. At the site, the city's bomb squad found chemical residue and an unexploded improvised explosive device (IED) that was similar to a pipe bomb. Two men were arrested and charged with possession of a weapon of mass destruction in relationship to this incident; police also issued photographs of other alleged suspects. A police surveillance drone at the event captured video footage showing a person spray painting the base of the former monument, in addition to an explosion with a plume of smoke.

== Removal ==
=== Legal issues ===
In June 2020, the Asheville City Council explored the possibility of removing the Vance Monument. One obstacle was the 2015 North Carolina Statute 100–2.1 that allows privately owned monuments to be moved but stated that monuments on public land could not be moved unless they were relocated to a "site of similar prominence". State Senator Jim Davis, primary sponsor of the 2015 law prohibiting removal of Civil War–era monuments, said he believed history needed to be preserved and that trying to rewrite history and remove monuments would not change the fact that slavery existed. However, Davis acknowledged that there were some exceptions to the statute and that the only recourse when violated was through the courts.

City attorney Brad Branham said it was not clear who owned the Vance Monument and additional research was needed. He said, "Records from the time of its erection are often unclear or unavailable." Part of the state law also required a review by the North Carolina Historical Commission. However, Branham said that only applied to state-owned monuments.

At first, some thought that the United Daughters of the Confederacy (UDC) owned the Vance Monument, but not the land it was on. Then, it was determined that the UDC had just placed a plaque and a free-standing stone by the monument. However, Sara N. Powell, president of the North Carolina Division of the UDC, said the additions to Vance Monument—a plaque and free-standing stone—were "gifts and protected by state law". However, the city continued its efforts to determine if the monument was private property. Attorney Kirk Lyons of the Southern Legal Resource Center said, "They will probably have a very hard time proving that because, you know, things were done on a handshake a hundred years ago."

By March 2021, the city claimed it could remove the monument despite the state statute as the monument was a "public safety hazard because of numerous incidents of vandalism and threats to destroy it". The Charlotte Observer reported that the monument would be destroyed, rather than being stored or relocated.

=== Vance Monument Task Force ===
In June 2020, Asheville's city council voted unanimously adopted a joint resolution giving the United Daughters of the Confederacy ninety days to remove their additions, and appointing a twelve-member task force to determine if the monument should be removed, re-purposed, or retained with another name on it. The Buncombe County board of commissioners also approved the joint-resolution, with a vote of 4 to 3. The board received 549 messages in favor of removing the Vance Monument and nineteen calls in favor of retaining it. Buncombe County chairman Brownie Newman said he did not believe "that monument which romanticizes the Confederacy belongs on city or county-owned land." City Council member Keith Young, who is African American, said he believed that those who erected the monument were saying to black people, "We still have power. We still have control. And this is your place in our society."

The city council appointed its six members and two alternates to the task force on July 28. 2020. The county did the same. The task force voted to recommend the removal of the Vance Monument on November 19, 2020. On December 8, 2020, the city council voted six to one to accept the recommendation, with a final decision on the removal pending future information on costs. The dissenting vote was cast by Sandra Kilgore, an African American, who said removing it would destroy an artistic monument and strain race relations. On March 23, 2021, the city council voted six to one to remove the monument for $114,150 (equivalent to $135,626 in 2023) awarded to an Asheville contractor. Additional funds were offered to conduct visioning for the site.

=== Lawsuits ===
A Civil War re-enactment group based in Rutherfordton, North Carolina called the Historical Preservation of the 26th North Carolina Troops Inc., also known as the 26th North Carolina Regiment, filed a lawsuit in April 2021 claiming the city was in breach of contract by voting to remove the monument despite the group's restoration efforts since 2015, including the raising of nearly $140,000. Buncombe County Superior Court Judge Alan Thornburg dismissed the suit on April 30, 2021.

The 26th North Carolina Regiment filed an emergency request with the North Carolina Court of Appeals to halt the demolition of the monument until after they could file an appeal. The Court of Appeals acted on June 4, 2021, stopping demolition work and requiring the city to retain all parts of the monument. In a June 28, 2021 filing with the Court of Appeals, the 26th North Carolina Regiment claimed the city violated the order to stop work on the monument by removing the granite obelisk. The city said it moved the blocks for safety reasons and so that the area could be reopened. An attorney for the 26th North Carolina Regiment said it was not known where the blocks were as the city would not reveal this information because of security concerns. The group hoped the case would result in rebuilding the obelisk. However, its outcome depended on the resolution of a North Carolina Supreme Court case involving the Confederate Soldiers Monument in Winston-Salem, expected to take as long as eight months.

The Court of Appeals ruled in the City's favor on April 5, 2022. This ruling allowed Asheville to continue with its removal of the monument. There were fifteen days for an appeal to be filed. On April 10, the 26th North Carolina Regiment's board voted to appeal the ruling to the North Carolina Supreme Court. Their attorney, H. Edward Phillips III, said, "I still believe the City of Asheville does not have the authority to destroy the Vance Monument. What I do believe is that under the Monument Protection Act, the city has the authority to move the monument to a place of similar prominence and equal access to the public within the city." Phillips also added that the 26th North Carolina Regiment has standing in this case because of the money they raised to restore the monument.

The North Carolina Supreme Court blocked the April judgment from the Court of Appeals in December 2022, announcing that it would take the case. The plaintiff filed an appellant brief on February 16, 2023, to which the city indicated it would respond. The Supreme Court ruled in March 2024 that no breach of contract by the city took place, clearing the way for the removal of the monument's base.

The 26th North Carolina regiment filed a new lawsuit May 6, 2024 asking for a restraining order and injunction followed by a requirement that the monument be rebuilt.

=== Demolition ===
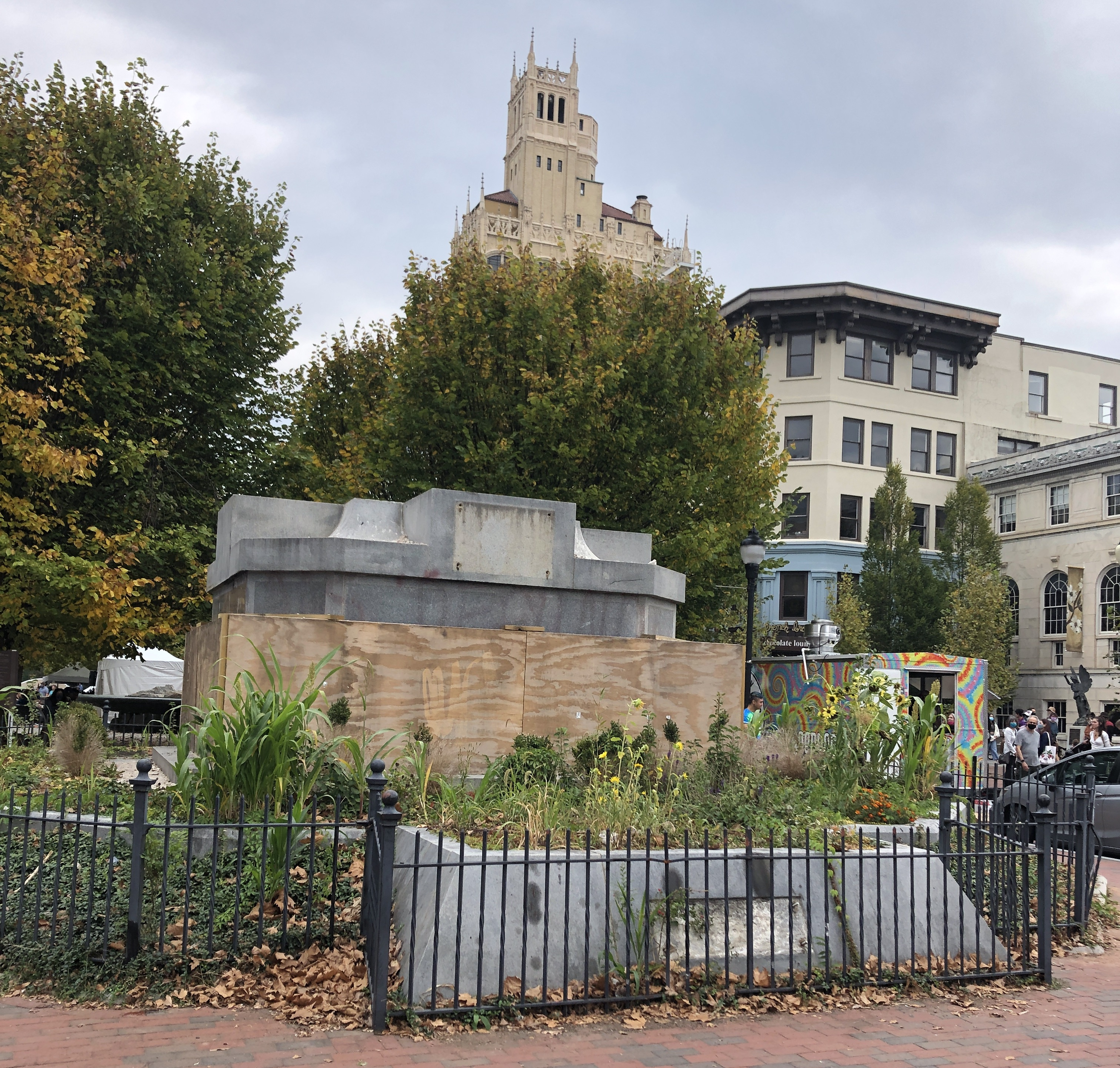
Pedestal after obelisk removal, October 2021

Demolition began on May 17, 2021, with the stone obelisk completely removed by the next day. The demolition team had to remove the stone blocks one at a time, without the use of a crane, because of the risk of damage to a nearby underground parking garage. Work was stopped occasionally because of wind. The cost of demolition was about $115,000. An additional $25,000 was budgeted for temporary landscaping after demolition, as well as $70,000 for visioning a site redesign.

Removal proceeded despite an emergency request filed in the North Carolina Court of Appeals by the 26th North Carolina Regiment. As of May 30, 2021, only the pedestal remained, with plans to remove it in two stages—one between June 7 and 9, and the other between June 14 and 21. Demolition work stopped because of a June 4, 2021, ruling from the Court of Appeals.

In April 2022, city attorney Brad Branham indicated that Asheville is holding onto the stone blocks. He said, "It's our goal that those be disposed of in a way that the Vance Monument cannot be recreated somewhere in the future." Branham confirmed in June 2024, after someone reported finding them, that the demolition company was storing the blocks, but that their sale or use was restricted by the contract. The city plans to make an inclusive square on the site of the former monument.

== See also ==
- List of Confederate monuments and memorials in North Carolina
- List of monuments and memorials removed during the George Floyd protests
