= Memorial to the Confederate Dead (Windsor, North Carolina) =

- Location: Windsor, North Carolina
- Coordinates: 35°59′50″N 76°56′44″W
- Type: Memorial
- Opening date: 1895
- Dedicated date: August 13, 1896
- Dedicated to: Confederate Dead

The Memorial to the Confederate Dead is an outdoor Confederate monument installed in Windsor, North Carolina, in the United States. It was erected in 1895 by the Confederate Veterans' Association of Bertie.

== See also ==
- List of Confederate monuments and memorials
