= Concerning the Jews =

1899 book by Mark Twain

- First page of 1934 reprint
- Author: Mark Twain
- Language: English
- Genre: Non-fiction
- Publisher: Harper's Monthly
- Publication date: 1899
- Publication place: United States
- Media type: Print
- Pages: 9

"Concerning the Jews" is an 1899 short essay by Mark Twain. Twain had lived in Austria during 1896, and opined that the Habsburg empire used Jews as scapegoats to maintain unity in their immensely diverse empire.

== Background ==
In 1898 he published the article "Stirring Times in Austria". Twain's account generated several letters, and one poignant response in particular from an American Jewish lawyer who asked Twain: "Tell me, therefore, from your vantage-point of cold view, what in your mind is the cause. Can American Jews do anything to correct it either in America or abroad? Will it ever come to an end? Will a Jew be permitted to live honestly, decently, and peaceably like the rest of mankind? What has become of the golden rule?" In response, Twain penned "Concerning the Jews," which Harper's also published in 1899.

== Contents ==
The essay included the statement that Jews did not do their part in terms of fighting in America's armed forces: "He is a frequent and faithful and capable officer in the civil service, but he is charged with an unpatriotic disinclination to stand by the flag as a soldier – like the Christian Quaker." However, when War Department figures revealed that Jewish Americans were actually represented in the nation's military in a larger percentage than their share of the population, Twain issued a retraction and an apology, entitled Postscript – The Jew as Soldier.

The essay also included a positive account of the Jewish people, with regard to their survival:

He has made a marvellous fight in this world, in all the ages; and has done it with his hands tied behind him. He could be vain of himself, and be excused for it. The Egyptian, the Babylonian, and the Persian rose, filled the planet with sound and splendor, then faded to dream-stuff and passed away; the Greek and the Roman followed, and made a vast noise, and they are gone; other peoples have sprung up and held their torch high for a time, but it burned out, and they sit in twilight now, or have vanished. The Jew saw them all, beat them all, and is now what he always was, exhibiting no decadence, no infirmities of age, no weakening of his parts, no slowing of his energies, no dulling of his alert and aggressive mind. All things are mortal but the Jew; all other forces pass, but he remains. What is the secret of his immortality?

== Reception ==
Israeli scholar Bennet Kravitz states that one could just as easily hate Jews for the reasons Twain gives for admiring them. In fact, Twain's essay was cited by Nazi sympathizers in the 1930s. Kravitz concludes, "The flawed logic of 'Concerning the Jews' and all philo-Semitism leads to the anti-Semitic beliefs that the latter seeks to deflate".

== See also ==
- Tolkien and race
- The Scattered Nation (c. 1870), a speech by Zebulon Vance
