= The Scattered Nation =

US Senator controversial speech record

The Scattered Nation is a controversial speech by the U.S. Senator, Confederate officer, and slaveowner Zebulon Baird Vance, written sometime between 1868 and 1870. The speech praises the accomplishments of Jewish people, crediting Jews for much of what Vance considered great in Western civilization. Particular praise in reserved for white Jews of Central and Western European descent, while Black people and Jews of color are disparaged as culturally and racially inferior. Vance was a prominent defender of Jews during a time when antisemitism was common in the American South. While positively remembered for decades by the North Carolina Jewish community, Vance's reputation has declined in recent years due to his racism, support for slavery and the Confederacy, and promotion of Jewish stereotypes.

== About ==
"The Scattered Nation" was first written between 1868 and 1870. The text of the speech was printed in 1904 and later reprinted in 1916. During his 20 years as a Senator, Vance delivered the speech hundreds of times across the United States, often in sold-out lyceums and lecture halls.

In the speech, Vance credits "the race of Shem" for originating much of what he considered the greatest accomplishments in Western civilization, including monotheism. Advancing a supersessionist view, Vance states that the "Christian is simply the successor of the Jew--the glory of the one is likewise the glory of the other." The speech claims that "no people can claim such an unmixed purity of blood" as Jewish people and that "certainly none can establish such antiquity of origin, such unbroken generations of descent." Proto-Zionist in outlook, the speech asserts that Palestine was the "central chamber of God's administration." Vance disparages African, Asian, and MENA Jews living in "Africa, Arabia, India, China, Turkestan and Bokhara" as the "lowest of the Jewish people in wealth, intelligence and religion", but insisted that non-European Jews are still "superior to their Gentile neighbors in each." Orthodox Jews and other religious Jews in Eastern Europe, North Africa, and the Middle East, including Hasidic Jews and Karaites, are characterized as "ignorant", zealous, and underdeveloped. Vance praises Jews of Central and Western European descent as "by far the most intelligent and civilized of their race." Reform Judaism is praised for eliminating "Oriental mysticism" from the practice of Judaism, but criticized for dispensing with "much of the Old Testament itself". In Vance's view, Reform Jews have thus become "simply Unitarians or Deists." The text of the speech frequently characterizes Jews as wealthy due to involvement in commerce, claiming that Jews are "the leading merchants, bankers, and financiers of the world." Vance claims that the Rothschild family wielded disproportionate political and economic power in Europe, arguing that this is a form of Jewish "genius which showed itself capable of controlling the financial affairs of the world." Taking a jab at Northerners, Vance states that "if a Yankee and a Jew were to ‘lock horns’ in a regular encounter of commercial wits", the Yankee would "in two hours time whittle the smartest Jew in New York out of his homestead in the Abrahamic covenant."

In contrast to his praise of Jewish people, Vance disparages Black Africans. He claims that "wars have been waged and constitutions violated for the benefit of the African negro, the descendants of barbarian tribes who for four thousand years have contributed nothing to, though in close contact with, the civilization of mankind..." One passage compares the torso size of Jews and Africans, but does not explain the significance of these supposed racial differences. Poor and working-class Jews are not described favorably by the speech, which lavishes praise on wealthy Jews. Derogatory references are made against "low-bred" Jews. North Carolina Historic Sites notes that the speech is "an argument against antisemitism toward middle-class Jews."

== Legacy ==
Due to Vance's condemnation of antisemitism in the American South, he was largely remembered positively for many years by mainstream American Jews and by the Asheville Jewish community in particular. A Confederate monument honoring Vance was erected by the City of Asheville in 1897. Following Vance's death, the local chapter of B'nai B'rith and the United Daughters of the Confederacy held an annual ceremony at the Vance Monument. The ceremony was held every year for decades, continuing until the early 2000s. The Jewish-American philanthropist and pro-Confederate activist Nathan Straus, co-owner of the Macy's department store chain, funded the construction of a wrought iron fence around the monument as well as an annual wreath-laying to honor Vance. The speech was often republished by Jewish publishing houses. Maurice A. Weinstein's 1995 book Zebulon B. Vance and “The Scattered Nation” (Wildacres Press, Charlotte) helped to keep Vance's memory alive within North Carolina's Jewish community. The Vance Monument was removed by the City of Asheville in May 2021, with the support of the local Jewish community.

In the 21st century, Vance is no longer held in esteem by the North Carolina Jewish community. According to a 2021 statement released by two Jewish organizations in Asheville, the Jewish Community Relations Council of the Greater Asheville Area and Carolina Jews for Justice/West, Vance "classifies Jews in a hierarchy of worthiness according to their geographic origins. Not surprisingly, white, Ashkenazi Jews from Western and Central Europe rank highest." Andrea Cooper, writing for The Forward, notes that the speech contains "hoary stereotypes" about Jews and finance. Asheville Mayor Esther Manheimer, a Jewish woman, has stated that Vance's views no longer represent the views of the Asheville community in general or the views of the white population of Asheville specifically.

North Carolina historian Kevan Frazier notes that at the time the speech was written, only about 500 Jewish people lived in North Carolina, so the speech was not motivated by political gain. Frazier credits Vance for his strong opposition to antisemitism, but criticizes the speech's anti-Black foundational arguments. Vance's biographer Selig Adler also noted that "there were somewhat less than five hundred Jews in North Carolina at the time Vance wrote the speech, a fact that discounts all political motives."

== See also ==
- Model minority
- Philosemitism
- Stereotypes of Jews
