= Florence Steele Martin Vance =

American diarist and letter writer (1840–1924)

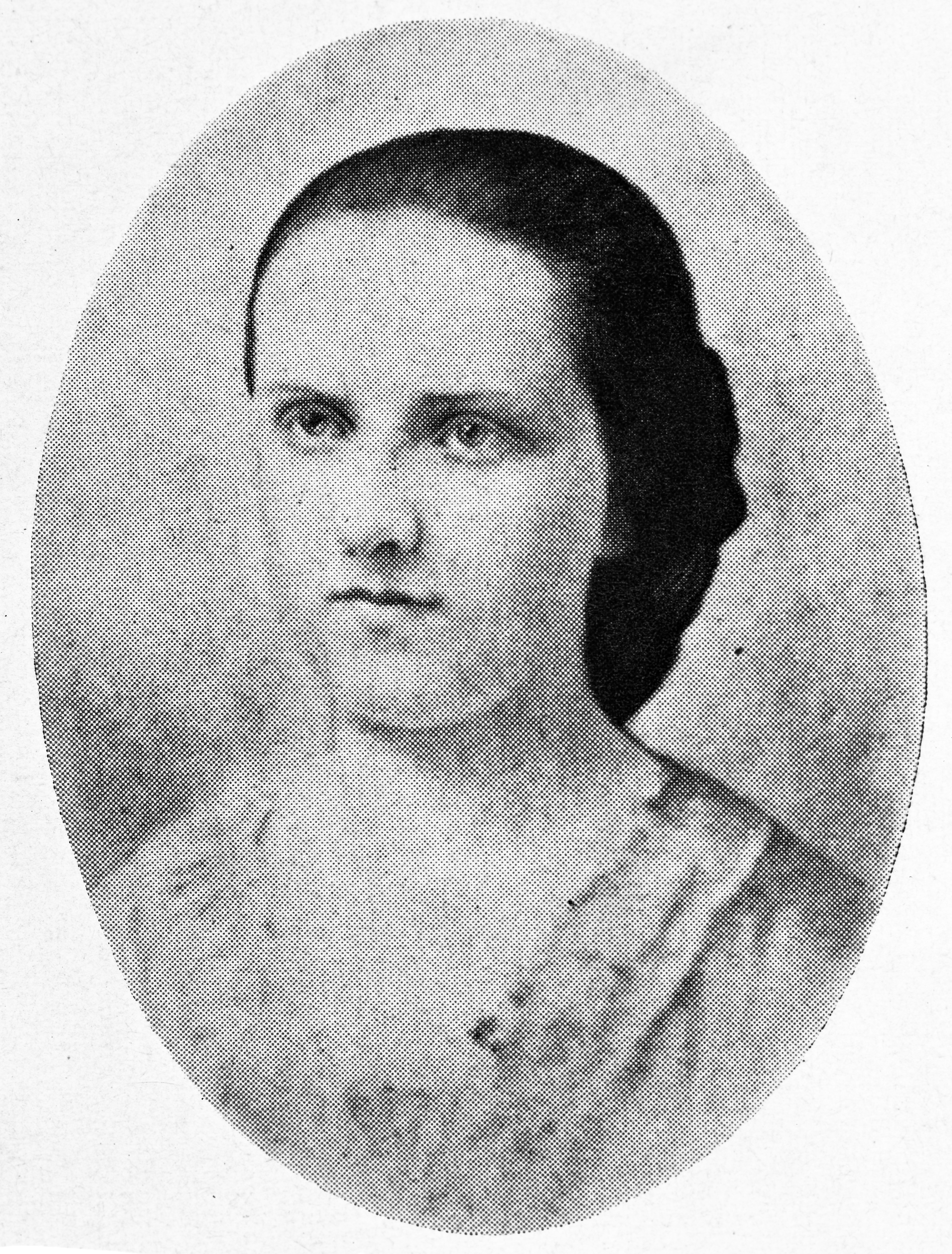
- Vance in 1880
- Born: Florence Steele; September 24, 1840; Oldham County, Kentucky, U.S.
- Died: April 22, 1924 (aged 83); Black Mountain, North Carolina, U.S.
- Resting place: Riverside Cemetery
- Spouses: John Henry Martin (1866–1871; his death); Zebulon Vance (m. 1880)
- Children: 1

Florence Steele Martin Vance (September 24, 1840 – April 22, 1924) was an American heiress, diarist, and letter writer. A wealthy Catholic widow, she later became the second wife of U.S. Senator Zebulon Vance.

== Biography ==
Vance was born Florence Steele on September 24, 1840, in Oldham County, Kentucky to Samuel Bledsoe Steele and Ann Alexis Brown Steele.

She married the first time, in 1866, to John Henry Martin. They had one son and lived in Louisville. She was widowed in 1871, leaving her with a fortune.

On January 21, 1880, while attending a ball at the Riggs House Hotel in Washington, D.C., she met the widowed Senator Zebulon Baird Vance of North Carolina. Three weeks later, they were engaged to be married. The two exchanged many lover letters throughout their engagement. As she was Catholic, and her fiancé was Presbyterian, religion was a concern for the couple. Senator Vance wrote to a friend saying, "Think of it! What will my Presbyterian friends say to me?" He was also embarrassed that she was wealthier than he, writing to her weeks before their wedding saying, "Tell them [her family] the simple truth about me Darling, as I told it to you—that I am a poor man & ever likely to be. You may boast of nothing for me except my love for you. …I do hope they will all learn to love me." They were married by a Catholic priest on June 17, 1880, at the home of her mother in Oldham County. She and Vance did not have any children together.

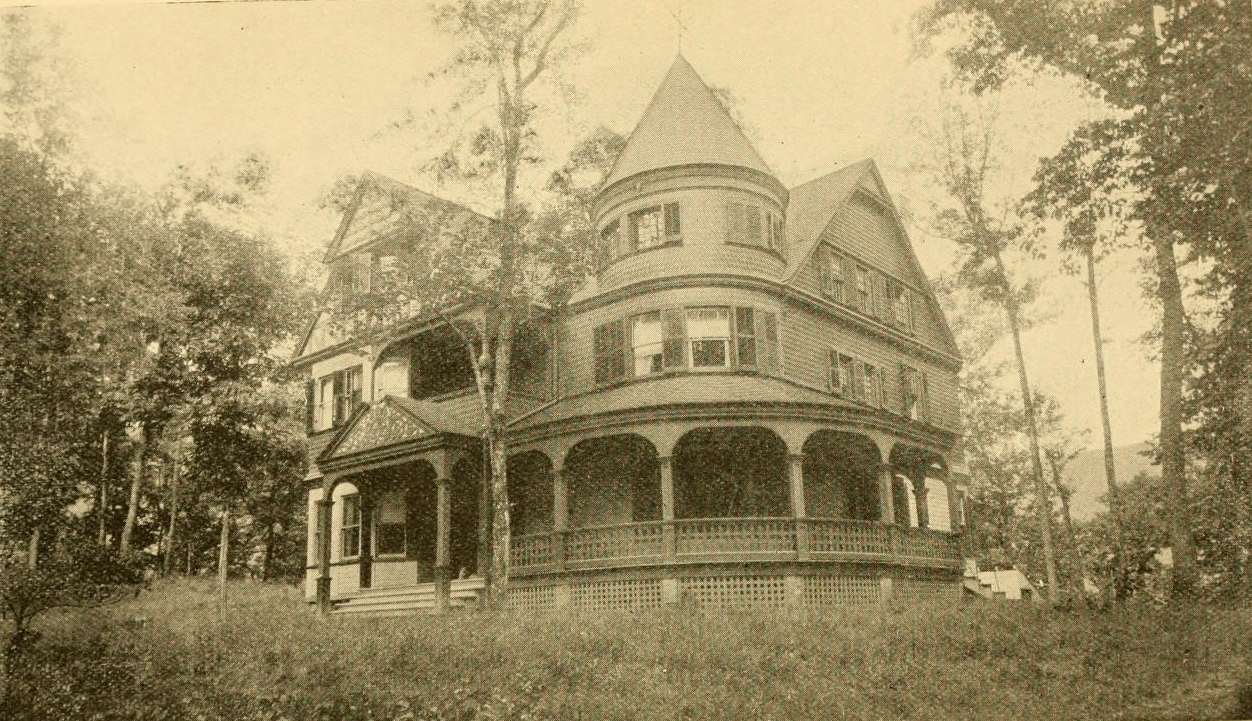
Gombroom, the Vance family home in Black Mountain, North Carolina

They lived at 1627 Massachusetts Avenue in Washington, D.C. and began building a mansion, called Gombroom, in Black Mountain, North Carolina. To fund the construction of their new home, her husband used part of her fortune and money made from selling land he had inherited from his mother in Asheville. The house was completed in 1887 and became their main residence. The Gombroom estate included orchards, vineyards, gardens, a dairy, and a springhouse. Vance kept a diary and wrote about her home, which she named after a city in Iran.

After her husband died in 1894, he was buried in the Vane family plot in Riverside Cemetery in Asheville, next to his first wife. She later had his grave moved into her family's plot in the same cemetery.

She died on April 22, 1924, in Black Mountain and was buried in Riverside Cemetery.
