= Zebulon Vance =

American politician (1830–1894)

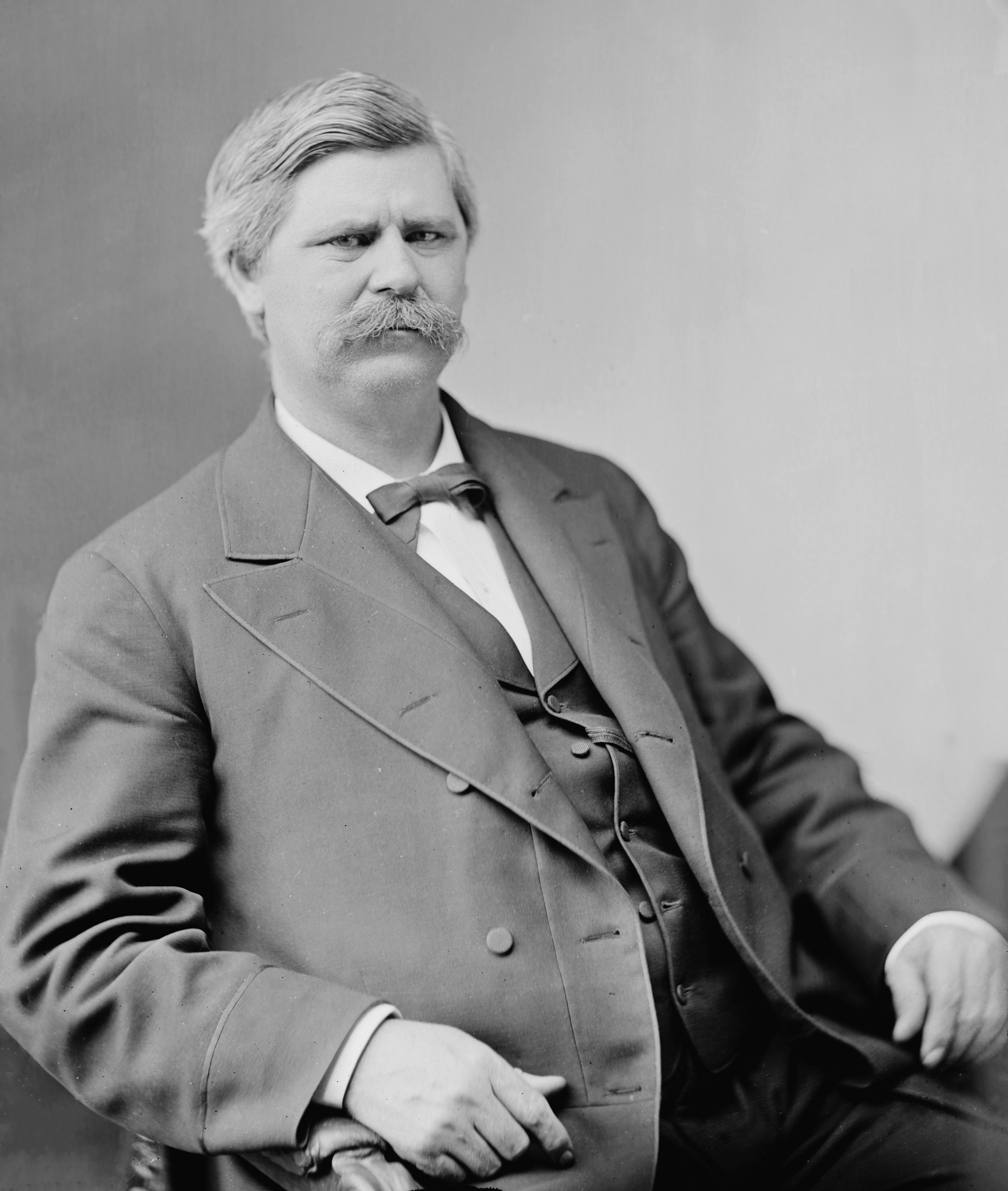

United States Senator from North Carolina
- In office March 4, 1879 – April 14, 1894
- Preceded by: Augustus S. Merrimon
- Succeeded by: Thomas Jarvis
- In office Not seated 1871
- Preceded by: Joseph Abbott
- Succeeded by: Matt Ransom

37th and 43rd Governor of North Carolina
- In office January 1, 1877 – February 5, 1879
- Lieutenant: Thomas J. Jarvis
- Preceded by: Curtis Brogden
- Succeeded by: Thomas Jarvis
- In office September 8, 1862 – May 29, 1865
- Preceded by: Henry Clark
- Succeeded by: William Holden

Member of the U.S. House of Representatives from North Carolina's 8th district
- In office December 7, 1858 – March 3, 1861
- Preceded by: Thomas L. Clingman
- Succeeded by: Robert B. Vance (1873)

Member of the North Carolina Senate
- In office December 1854 – November 1856
- Succeeded by: David Coleman

Personal details
- Born: Zebulon Baird Vance; May 13, 1830 Reems Creek, North Carolina, U.S.
- Died: April 14, 1894 (aged 63) Washington, D.C., U.S.
- Resting place: Riverside Cemetery
- Party: Whig (1852–1856); American (1857); Conservative (1862–1868); Democratic (1868–1894)
- Spouse(s): Harriett Newell Espy (1853~1878; her death); Florence Steele Martin (m. 1880)
- Children: 5
- Parent(s): David Vance Jr. Mira Margaret Baird
- Education: University of North Carolina, Chapel Hill
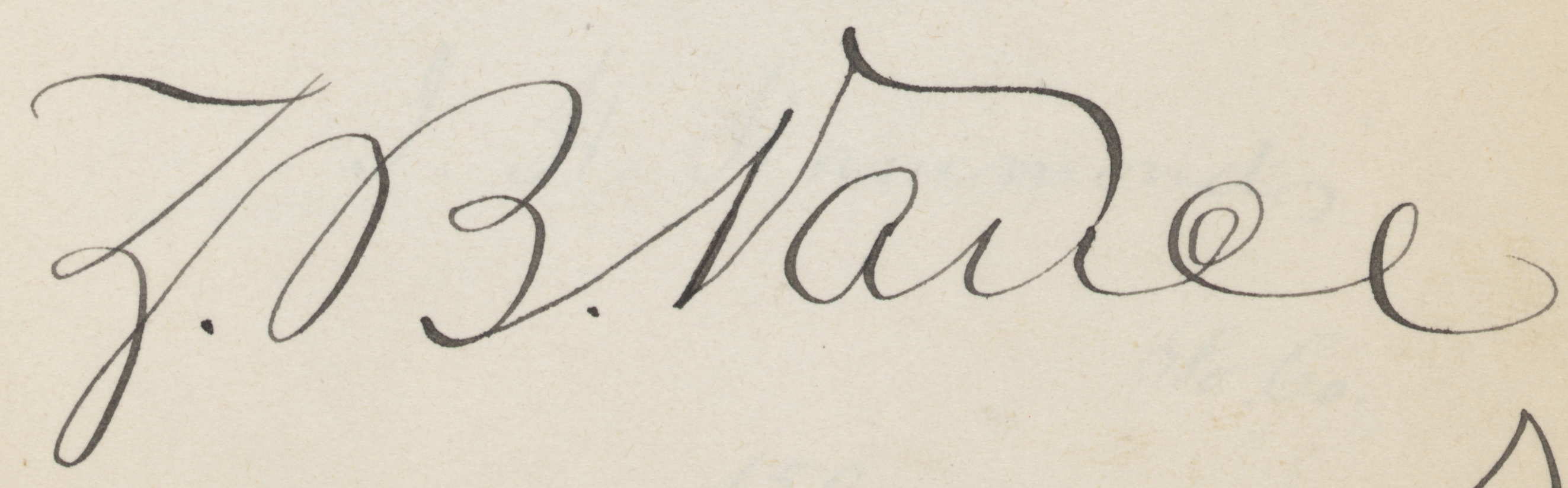
- Signature

Military service
- Allegiance: Confederate States
- Rank: Colonel
- Unit: 26th North Carolina Infantry Regiment; Rough and Ready Guards
- Battles/wars: Battle of New Bern; Seven Days Battles

Zebulon Baird Vance (May 13, 1830 – April 14, 1894) was an American lawyer and politician who served as the 37th and 43rd governor of North Carolina, a U.S. senator from North Carolina, and a Confederate officer during the American Civil War.

A prolific writer and noted public speaker, Vance became one of the most influential Southern leaders of the Civil War and Reconstruction Era periods. As a leader of the New South, Vance favored the rapid modernization of the Southern economy, railroad expansion, school construction, and reconciliation with the North. A Philosemite, he frequently spoke out against antisemitism. A progressive at his time, Vance was also a slave owner and is now regarded as a racist by some modern historians and biographers.

== Early life ==
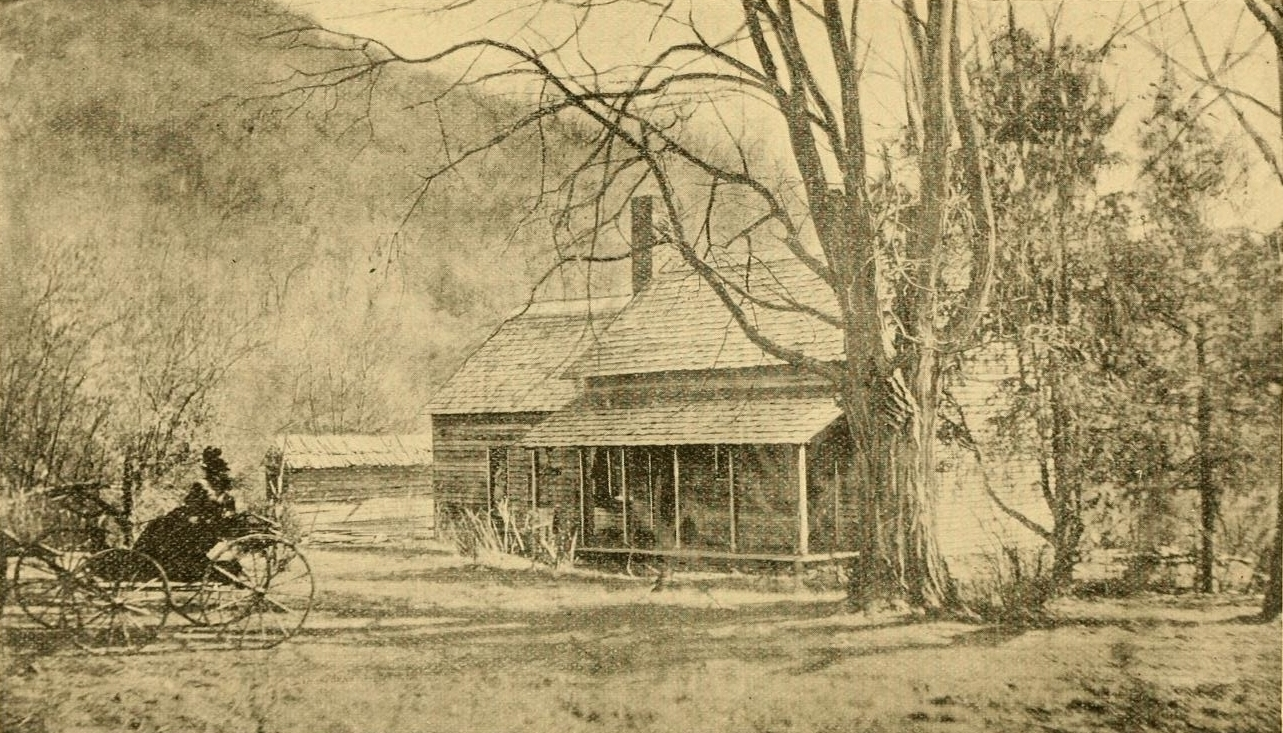
Vance Cabin, Reems Creek, North Carolina in the 19th century

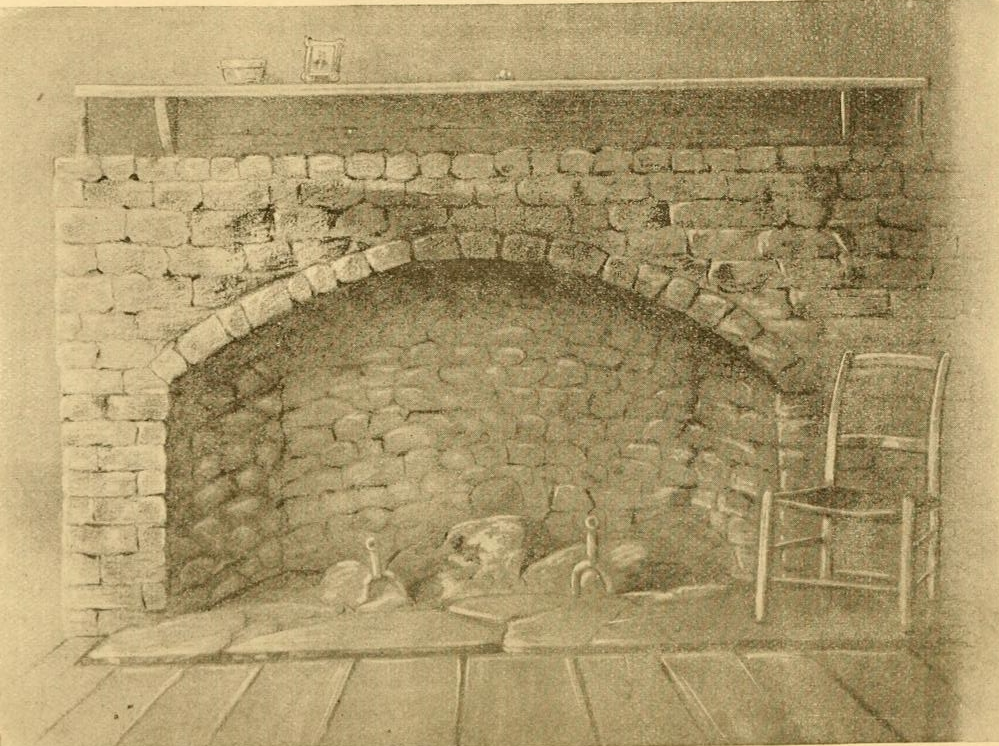
Fireplace inside Zebulon B. Vance Birthplace cabin in the 19th century

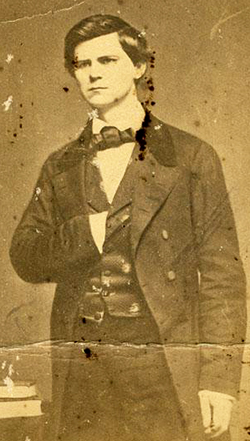
Vance, c. 1845 to 1850

Vance was born in a log cabin in the settlement of Reems Creek in Buncombe County, North Carolina, near present-day Weaverville, and was baptized at the Presbyterian church on Reems Creek. He was the third of eight children of David Vance Jr., a farmer and innkeeper, and his wife, Mira Margaret (née Baird). His paternal grandfather, David Vance, was a member of the North Carolina House of Commons and a colonel in the American Revolutionary War, serving under George Washington at Valley Forge. His maternal grandfather was Zebulon Baird, a state senator from Buncombe County, North Carolina. His uncle was Congressman Robert Brank Vance, namesake of his elder brother, Congressman Robert B. Vance. He was reared by Venus, a house slave.

Around 1833, the Vance family moved to Lapland, now Marshall, North Carolina. There, David Vance operated a stand, providing drovers with provisions as they moved hogs and other animals along the Buncombe Turnpike to markets to the south and east. Although frequently short of cash, the family kept as many as eighteen slaves. Vance's family had an unusually large library for its era and location, left to them by an uncle.

At the age of six, Vance attended schools operated by M. Woodson, Esq., first at Flat Creek and, later, on the French Broad River. Both were far enough from home that he had to board with others. He also was a student at a school in Lapland run by Jane Hughey.

While a youth, Vance broke his thigh when he fell from a tree. This was treated by confining Vance in a box, as was common medical care at the time. As a result of this injury, his right leg was shorter, requiring him to wear a taller heel on the right shoe. Even so, it was said that Vance had "a peculiar and slightly ambling gait".

When he was thirteen years old in fall 1843, Vance went to the Washington College in Tennessee. In January 1844, his father died from a construction accident, forcing Vance to withdraw before the school year was over. Mira Vance sold much of the family's property to pay her husband's many debts and to support her seven children. As one writer noted, the family was "embarrassed with debt". She moved her family to nearby Asheville, bringing along enslaved women and children as household workers. However, the family still lacked the money to send Vance back to school in Tennessee. Instead, Vance and his brother Robert attended Newton Academy in Asheville.

To help support his family, Vance worked for John H. Patton as a hotel clerk in Warm Springs, now Hot Springs, North Carolina. In Asheville, Vance studied law under attorney John W. Woodfin. When he was 21 years old, Vance wrote to a family friend, David L. Swain, asking for a loan to study law in college. Swain was a former North Carolina governor and then president of the University of North Carolina at Chapel Hill. Swain was also an elementary schoolmate of Vance's mother. Swain arranged for a $300 loan for Vance from the university.

Vance attended University of North Carolina at Chapel Hill starting in July 1851 and had a "brilliant academic year". One of his classmates, Major James W. Wilson, recalled Vance's arrival in Chapel Hill with "homemade shoes and clothes, about three inches of between pants and shoes, showing his sturdy ankles...." Another classmate, Kemp P. Battle, wrote Vance "had a brain large and active; a memory tenacious, a nature overflowing with joyous love of fun, and to a surprising degree accurate information of many subjects and many authors." While at the university, Vance was a member of the Dialectic Society, which helped improve his oratory skills, as well as his ability to speak extemporarily. He also joined the Phi Gamma Delta fraternity. Vance received an LL.D in 1852 and repaid the loan from the university with interest.

Vance then went to Raleigh, where he studied law with Judge William Horn Battle of the North Carolina Supreme Court and Samuel F. Phillips, former Solicitor General of the United States.

== Pre-Civil War career ==
=== Attorney ===
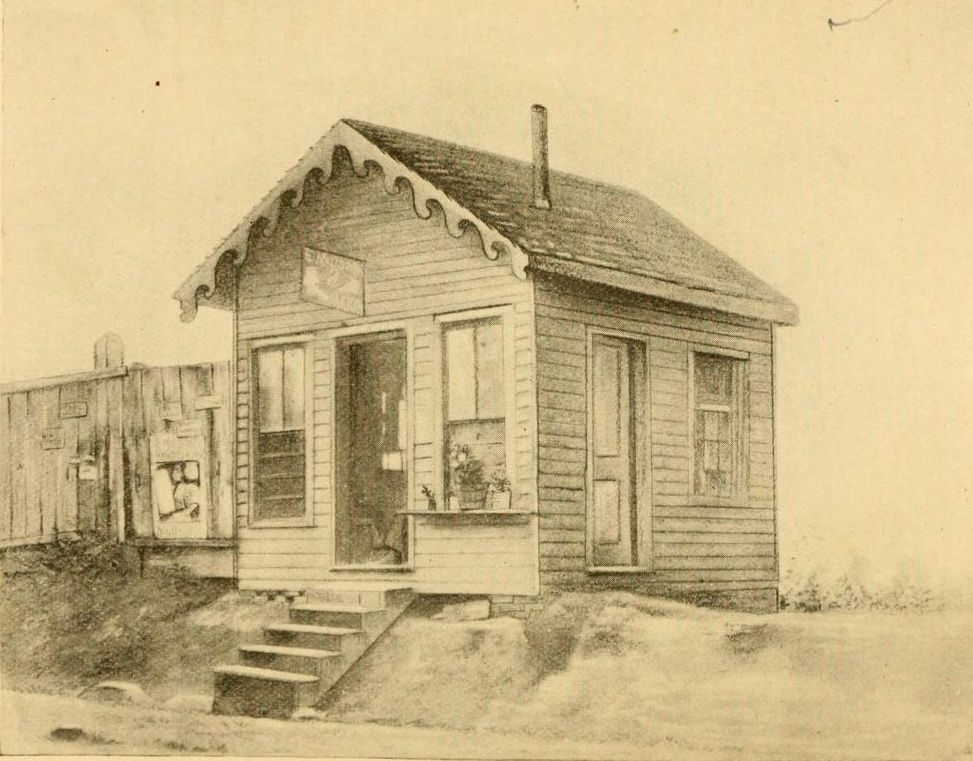
Vance's first law office, Asheville, North Carolina

On January 1, 1852, Vance was admitted to the North Carolina Bar and received his county court license in Raleigh. He returned to Asheville, where he practiced law. Vance said, "I went out to Court horseback, and carried a pair of saddle bags with a change of shirts and the North Carolina Form book...." Almost immediately, the Buncombe County magistrates elected Vance as Solicitor of the Court of Pleas. He was admitted to the state's superior courts in 1853. In 1858, he became partners with attorney William Caleb Brown.

Although he did not always prepare fully for cases, Vance was skilled at reading the jury and remembering every detail of testimony. However, his success in court "was usually the result of wit, humor, boisterous eloquence, and clever retorts, not knowledge of the law."

=== North Carolina Senate ===
After canvassing for Whig presidential candidate Winfield Scott in 1852, Vance became interested in his entry into politics. In 1853, he was a delegate representing Buncombe County at a railroad convention in Cumberland Gap, Tennessee. The goal of the convention was to convince the Charleston and Cincinnati Railroad to build a route through the mountains in Western North Carolina.

Next, Vance ran as a Whig candidate for the North Carolina Senate, winning with a term starting in December 1854. Vance was a Whig in the mode of Henry Clay. He wrote, "I was raised in the Whig faith, and taught to revere the names of Clay, Webster, and other great leaders of that party." Whig policies were more beneficial to Western North Carolina and its smaller farms where Vance was from, while the Democratic Party of that era tended to advocate for the owners of large slave plantations found in Eastern North Carolina.

While in the legislature, Vance worked on issues related to transportation in Western North Carolina, including introducing a bill for a public road in Yancey County and another bill to authorize subscriptions to fund the French Broad and Greenville Railroad. He also supported extending the Western North Carolina Railroad into the state's mountain counties, favoring a route that would take the tracks to Knoxville, Tennessee by way of Asheville, North Carolina.

When the Whig Party collapsed over the issue of slavery in 1854, Vance refused to join the primarily Southern Democratic Party or the anti-slavery Republicans, ultimately settling on the American Party, also known as the Know-Nothings. However, Vance lost his campaign for reelection to the North Carolina Senate in 1856 to David Coleman.

=== Journalism ===
In March 1855, John D. Hyman of the Asheville Spectator convinced Vance to join the newspaper as an editorial assistant. He predicted that Vance would have "a brilliant career in the editorial line". This weekly newspaper was published from 1853 to 1858 and was the leading Whig paper in the region. One of the stories Vance wrote was about the search for Dr. Elisha Mitchell who disappeared in June 1857, having fallen to his death while trying to prove which peak was the highest in North Carolina. Mitchell taught Vance geology at the University of North Carolina, and Vance immediately volunteered for the search party. His account of the search, published in the Spectator in July 1857, is considered the most complete record of the tragic event.

Vance stopped working as joint editor of the Spectator after a year, but became half-owner of the newspaper. However, Hyman's steadfast support of Vance in the Spectator was a huge help to Vance's political career. The opposition paper, the Asheville News wrote, "Mr. Vance is the Spectator's specialty, and at every mention of his name it sputters and snaps and snarls like a cat with its tail in a steel trap. To question the correctness of his views on a public issue, the Spectator seems to regard as little short of treason."

=== U.S. Congress ===
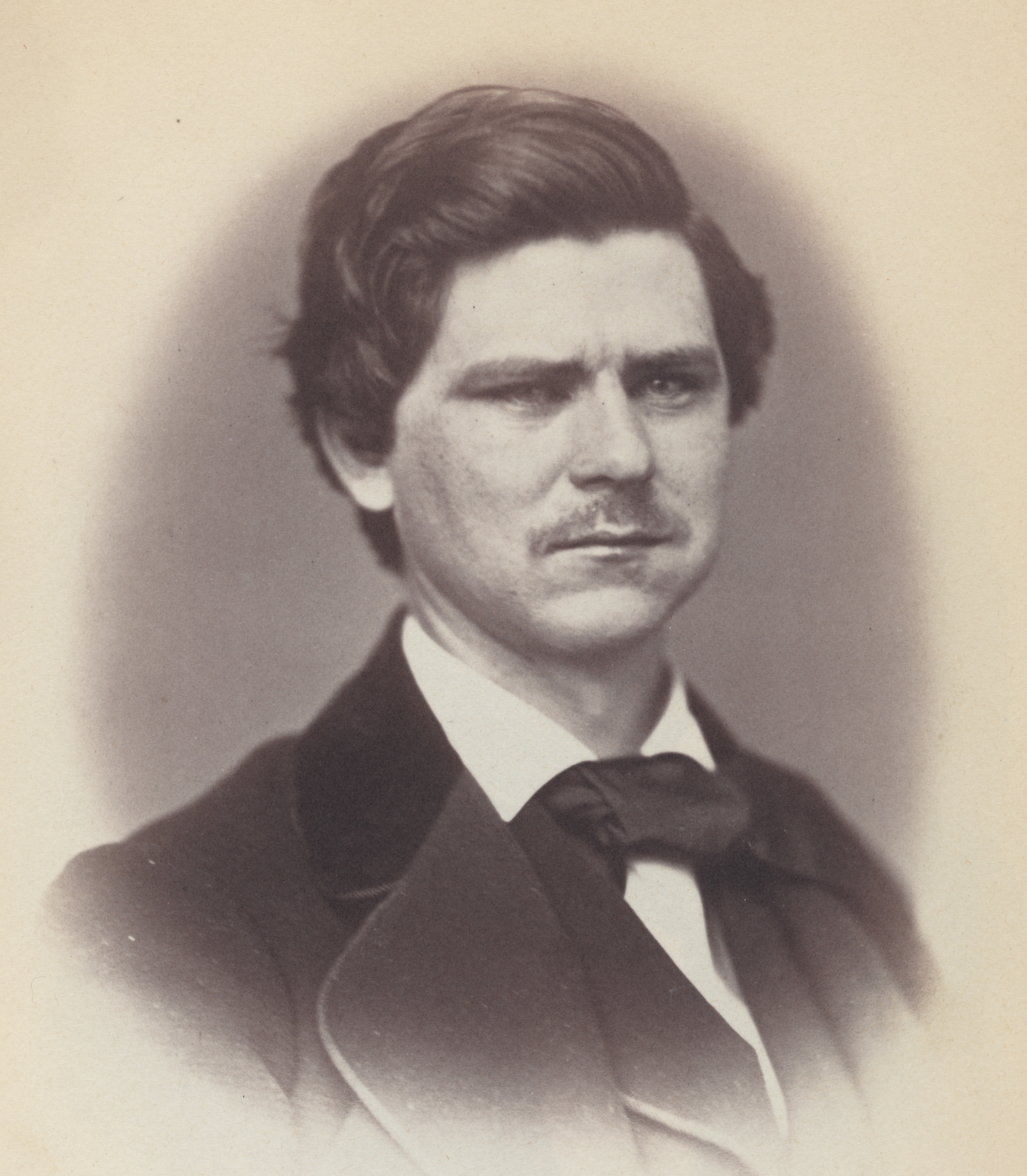
Vance, 35th Congress photo by Julian Vannerson, 1859

In 1858, Vance ran for a seat in the U.S. Congress opened by the resignation of Thomas Lanier Clingman. For this campaign, he went on a fifteen-county speaking tour that "set the mountains on fire". Vance was elected for a term starting in December 1858. At 28 years old, he was the youngest member of Congress at the time. He was reelected in 1859 over his former political opponent David Coleman.

==== Salaries and deficits ====
When Congress proposed giving a $10,000 or 25% increase in fringe benefits to each representative in the next session, Vance spoke out. He said, "I do not think he [my successor] is entitled to $10,000 more for miscellaneous items than I am myself...the whole bill reminds me very much of the bills I have seen of fast young men at fashionable hotels: For two days board, $5, sundries, $50. It is like a comet, a very small body with an exceedingly great tail."

Similarly, he showed a dislike for the recurring Treasury deficit. Ignoring the figures and charts presented by his colleagues, Vance said, "As we are in debt, and spending more than our income, and our income is derived principally from the tariff, we have to do one of three things; either raise that income, lower our expenses, or walk into the insolvent court and file our schedule. I do not think there is, or ever was, a political economist on earth who could deny these propositions."

==== Slavery and secession ====
While serving in Congress Vance was pro-slavery, saying in March 1860:

Plainly and unequivocally, common sense says keep the slave where he is now—in servitude. The interest of the slave himself imperatively demands it. The interest of the master, of the United States, of the world, nay of humanity itself, says, keep the slave in his bondage; treat him humanely, teach him Christianity, care for him in sickness and old age, and make his bondage light as may be; but above all, keep him a slave and in strict subordination; for that is his normal condition; the one in which alone he can promote the interest of himself or his fellows.

Despite his support for the institution of slavery, Vance was openly against North Carolina's secession from the union, preferring a strategy where both slavery and the union could be preserved. In writing to a friend, he advised caution about secession:

"We have everything to gain and nothing on earth to lose by delay, but by too hasty action we may take a fatal step that we never can retrace—may lose a heritage that we can never recover though we seek it earnestly and with tears."

However, Vance was in favor of a secession convention so that the people of North Carolina could make their own decision. In March 1861, Vance traveled throughout North Carolina, trying to persuade the state not to follow South Carolina by seceding. In April, he was addressing a large crowd when a telegraph was read announcing the firing on Fort Sumter and President Lincoln's call for 75,000 volunteers. At that moment, Vance recalled sadly changing into a secessionist, as he "preferred to shed northern rather than southern blood." On the spot, he shifted his speech to a call to fight for South Carolina. After the Battle of Fort Sumter, Vance resigned from Congress and headed home to Buncombe County.

== Civil War ==
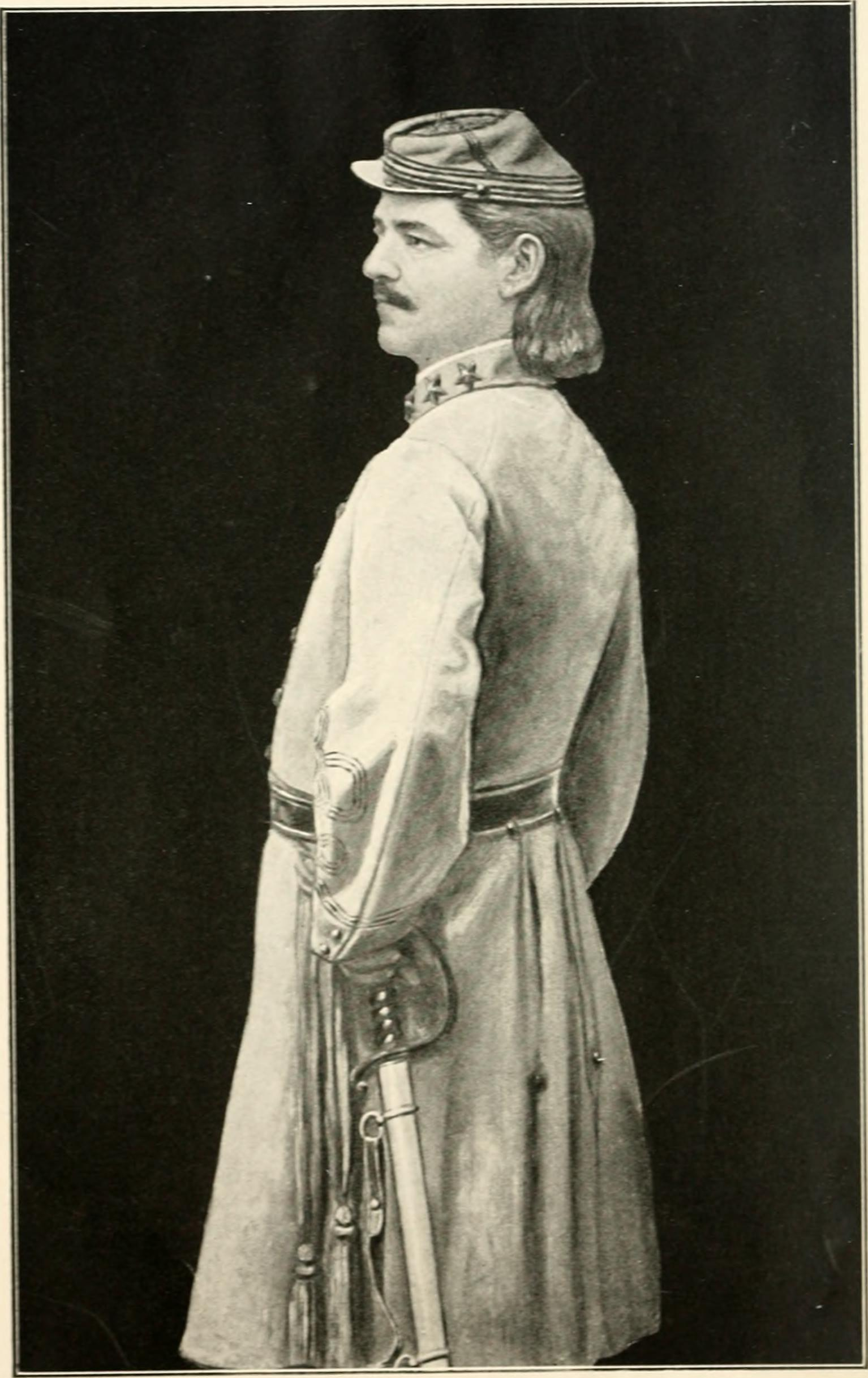
Vance in the Civil War

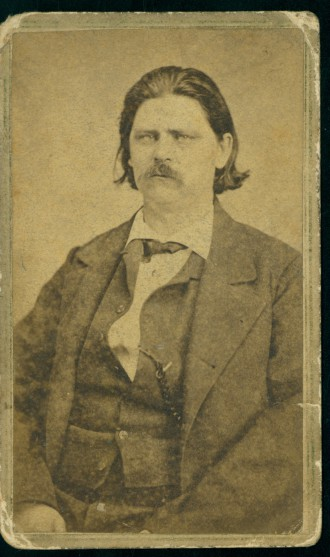
Governor Vance on his Inauguration Day 1862

=== Soldier ===
On May 4, 1861, two weeks before North Carolina seceded, Vance raised a company of local men known as the Rough and Ready Guards and became their captain. The Rough and Ready Guards became part of Company F, 14th North Carolina Infantry, and encamped near Morganton, North Carolina. By June 1861, Vance and the 14th were in Suffolk, Virginia, helping to defend Norfolk. That August, Vance was elected colonel of the 26th North Carolina Infantry Regiment, stationed at Fort Macon in Carteret County, North Carolina.

Vance and the 26th engaged in the Battle of New Bern in March 1862. Although outnumbered four to one, Vance's troops held back the enemy for five hours and were the last Confederates to leave the battlefield. Vance wrote his wife praising the performance of his men." Even in their 35-mile forced retreat, Vance showed bravery. He nearly drowned swimming 75 yards across the flooded Bryce's Creek to get boats for his men—the three soldiers who swam with him drowned.

In July 1862, Vance and the 26th fought at Malvern Hill outside of Richmond, Virginia. The Confederates were not victorious, but Vance again showed "unflinching leadership". When North Carolina needed a new governor, his name was immediately mentioned.

=== Governor, 1st term ===
==== Campaign ====
In 1862, Vance ran for governor as the "soldier's candidate" and easily won over secessionist Democrat William J. Johnston of Charlotte. Vance did not leave his troops to campaign, nor did he give any speeches or present a platform. Instead, he wrote a letter that was published in the Fayetteville Observer saying, "If, therefore, my fellow citizens believe that I could serve the great Cause better as Governor than I am now doing, and should see proper to confer this responsibility upon me without solicitation on my part, I should not feel at liberty to decline it, however conscious of my own unworthiness."

His campaign was overseen by William W. Holden of Raleigh's North Carolina Standard and Edward J. Hale, of the Fayetteville Observer. Holden had been driven out of the Democratic Party in 1860 because he opposed secession. Holden, like Vance, was now a member of the Conservative Party of North Carolina, a coalition of former Whigs and Democrats who were against secession. Holden simply wrote that voters should "elect the man who defended their homes", noting that Johnston was at home tending to his railroads while Vance was "in the face of the foe, with his sword drawn, ready for action". It also helped that Johnston's Democratic party could be blamed for "high prices, conscription, military defeats, suffering of the soldiers, and the suspension of the writ of habeas corpus".

Vance received 54,423 of 74,871 total votes, carrying all but twelve of the state's counties. This continues to be the largest margin of victory for a governor's race in the history of North Carolina. Vance was serving with the 26th in the trenches at Petersburg, Virginia when he learned about the outcome of the election. He resigned his commission and traveled to Raleigh to become governor. At the time, he was 32 years old.

==== War governor ====
For his inauguration on September 8, 1862, Vance's old regimental band, the Johnny Rebs, performed "Governor Vance's Inauguration March". During his address, Vance said he would "prosecute the war until the South obtained its independence". This helped calm the North Carolina Democrats and the Confederate government who both feared Vance would rejoin the union or withdraw from the Confederacy. General Robert E. Lee said, "Vance's oratory was worth 5,000 soldiers".

Vance's first objective was to confine the Union troops in the eastern counties, hold the state's main port Wilmington, and protect the Weldon Railroad. Thus, he worked with the Confederate war department to add troops at Kinston, North Carolina to protect the railroad and watch the enemy encampments. Despite Vance's continued requests to Richmond for military reinforcements, he was ignored and North Carolina's defenses failed when 10,000 Union troops advanced on Kinston in December 1862. To help solve the shortage of soldiers, Vance offered amnesty to all deserters who returned to service; large numbers of North Carolina's soldiers returned to active duty in 1863.

Vance aspired to provide the state's troops with needed food, clothing, and weapons. He also demonstrated concern for the soldiers' families. He continued to operate salt works on the coast, selling the salt at one-third of its value and distributing salt supplies to every county for meat preservation. He also proposed a welfare system and kept the textile mills operational. To achieve this, Vance relied on blockade runners to export North Carolina's cotton abroad. This yielded funds to provide food and money for the general population and to keep the mills open; the legislature was able to issue $6,000,000 for the care of impoverished citizens and keep the mills open. The blockade runners also brought needed shoes, blankets, and medicine. Vance ensured that his state's soldiers were kept clothed by having women and children fashion new uniforms in their homes with material manufactured in the state's mills. As a result, North Carolina was the only state to clothe and equip its regiments during the Civil War. Vance also shared surpluses with the rest of the Confederacy; General James Longstreet's troops received 12,000 uniforms from North Carolina after the Battle of Chickamauga.

Vance was a major proponent of individual rights and local self-government, often putting him at odds with the Confederate government. When President Jefferson Davis announced plans to indefinitely imprison Southerners suspected of "disloyalty" without a trial, Vance refused to deprive North Carolinians of their constitutional rights, saying he would rather recall the state's soldiers fighting in Virginia and order them to protect his constituents by force if necessary. Davis did not risk challenging Vance; as a result, North Carolina was the only state to observe the right of habeas corpus and keep its courts fully functional during the war.

Vance also opposed Confederate conscription practices, which became more severe as Confederate defeats mounted. He was especially against the policy that allowed plantation owners and rich businessmen to avoid fighting by paying others to serve in their place, a practice described as creating "a rich man's war and a poor man's fight". Postwar, Vance testified in the hearing investigating George Pickett's execution of 22 alleged Confederate deserters in the aftermath of the Battle of New Bern. He testified that the North Carolinians had joined on the understanding that they would be used only for local defense and that "the Confederate government did not keep faith with these local troops, who were transfer[red] to the regular service in violation of their enlistment agreement." His testimony questioned the legality of Pickett's decision to hang Confederate deserters who had later sided with the Union and put Pickett at risk of prosecution for war crimes.

In his unpublished autobiography, Vance stated that his main reason for supporting the Confederate government was to preserve the institution of slavery. Historian Selig Adler wrote, "As war governor, Vance endeared himself forever to his people. He mitigated the horrors of war by insisting on the precedence of civil law, and stoutly protected the state from the uncomfortable militarism of the Confederate government."

=== Governor, 2nd term ===
Vance was reelected as governor in 1864, defeating former supporter, Unionist Democrat, and now peace candidate William Woods Holden.

In early April 1865, General William T. Sherman's troops neared Raleigh, North Carolina. Vance wrote to Sherman requesting a meeting, hoping to prevent the state's capital city from being pillaged. He requested safe conduct to discuss North Carolina surrendering to the Union. Two of Vance's men met with Sherman; although they did not reach an agreement about ending the war, they did save Raleigh. Sherman was willing to talk to Vance, but by then Vance had been called to meet with Confederate President Jefferson Davis and his cabinet in Charlotte, North Carolina. At that meeting, the Confederate government released Vance from any obligations to defend the Confederacy. Vance was the last governor to reside in the Governor's Palace, as it was seized by Sherman.

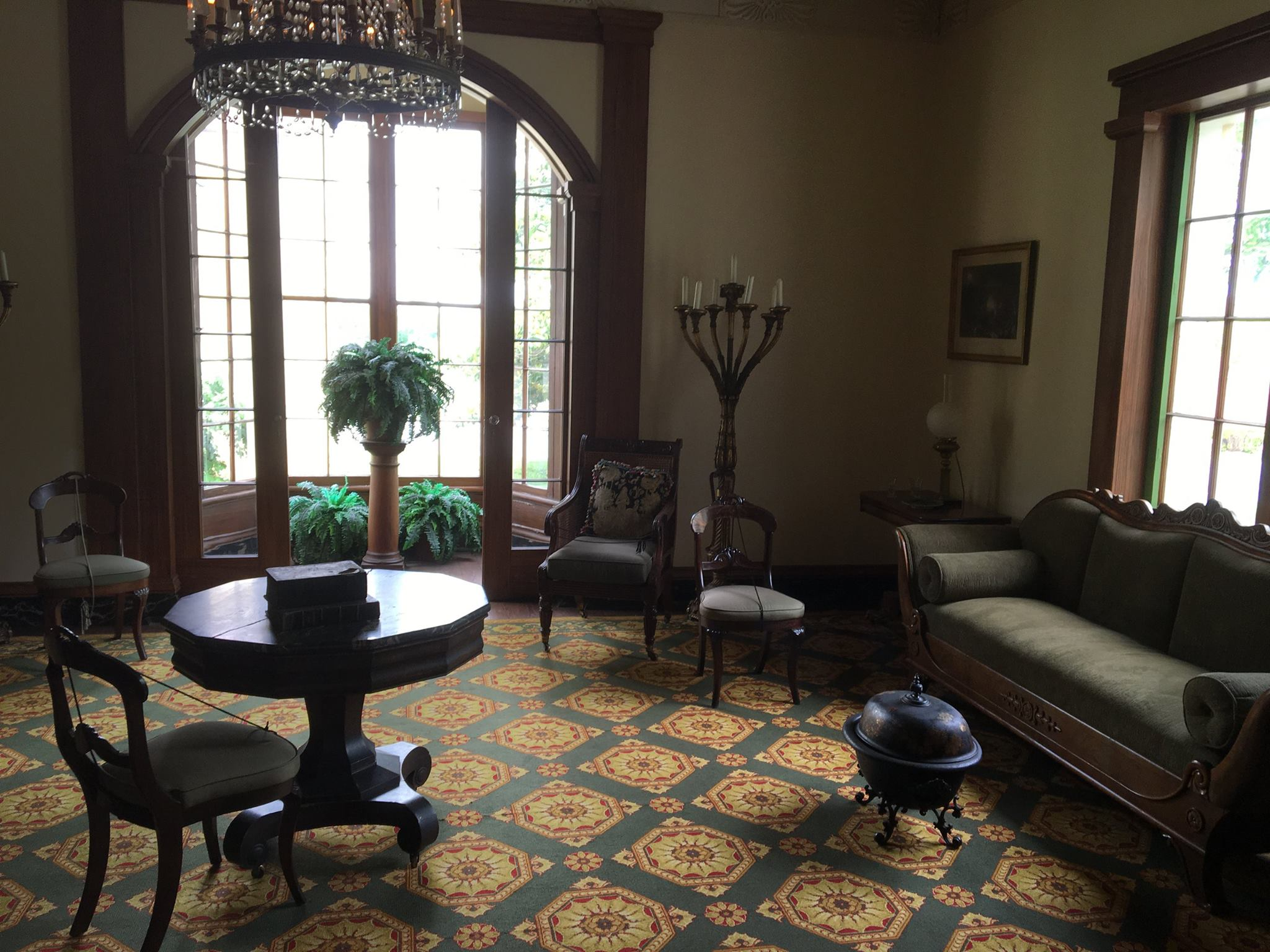
Blandwood Mansion's west parlor where Vance surrendered

On April 26, 1865, Vance learned that Confederate General Joseph E. Johnston had surrendered his forces to Sherman at the James Bennett farmhouse near Durham, North Carolina. On April 28, Vance gave a final proclamation to the people of his state, telling both civilians and soldiers "to retire quietly in their homes, and exert themselves in preserving order". He then surrendered to General John M. Schofield in the west parlor of Blandwood Mansion in Greensboro, North Carolina on May 2, 1865. Schofield accepted Vance's surrender and told him to go to Statesville, North Carolina where Mrs. Vance and their children were living, as he had no orders for Vance's arrest.

Some have said that Vance left Raleigh when it was captured by Sherman and that his house in Statesville was a temporary state capitol. These claims emerged as part of a political attack against Vance by Republicans during the 1876 governor's race. There is no evidence that Vance conducted official business in Statesville; rather, it seems he relinquished the office of governor once he left Raleigh.

On May 29, 1865, William Woods Holden, Vance's former political opponent, was appointed governor of North Carolina by President Andrew Johnson.

=== Prisoner ===
Vance was arrested in Statesville on May 13, 1865, his 35th birthday, by General Hugh Judson Kilpatrick. Samuel Wittkowsky, the man who gave prisoner Vance a wagon ride to the train station, noted that Vance was silently shedding tears at first. Then, wiping his eyes, Vance expressed concern for his wife and children who had no money to live on and worried about the "indignities" that North Carolina might suffer in the aftermath of the war.

After a short imprisonment in Raleigh, Vance arrived at the Old Capitol Prison in Washington, D.C. on May 20, 1865. There, he shared a small cell with John Letcher, the former Governor of Virginia. Each man had an iron bed and chair. They had to pay for their meals which came from a local restaurant. Vance filed for parole on June 3, 1865, using President Johnson's amnesty program. At the time, Vance's wife was very ill, and Johnson's sympathies lay with reuniting the family. He paroled Vance on July 6, 1865, after an imprisonment of 47 days.

Vance was formally pardoned on March 11, 1867; although no formal charges were filed against him before his arrest, during his imprisonment, or during his parole.

== Postwar career ==
=== Attorney ===
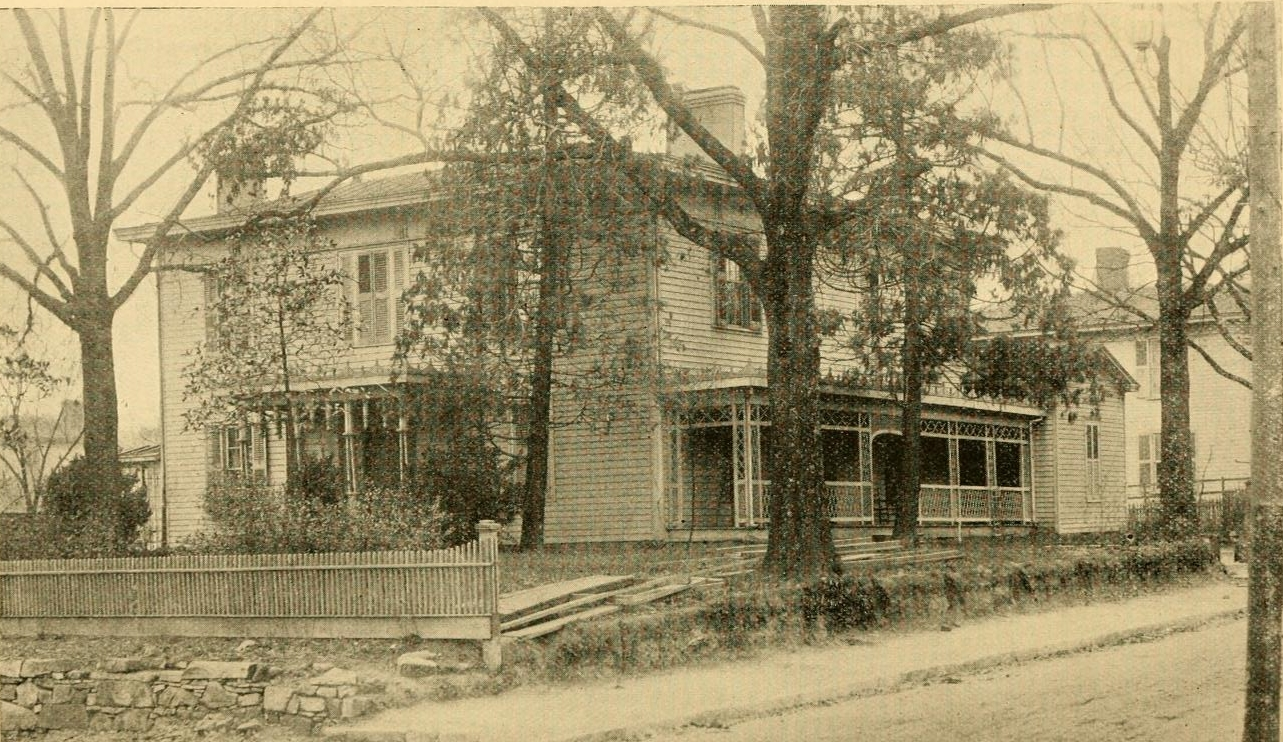
Vance's residence in Charlotte, North Carolina in the 19th century

After the war, Vance practiced law in Statesville briefly before moving to Charlotte, North Carolina, where he formed a practice with Clement Dow and R. D. Johnson. In addition to Charlotte, he had court cases in Concord, Dallas, Lexington, Lincolnton, Monroe, and Salisbury. Among his clients was former Confederate soldier, Tom Dula, who was accused of murdering his girlfriend Laura Foster in 1866. While he succeeded in having the trial moved from Wilkesboro to Statesville, believing Dula could not receive a fair trial in Wilkes County, Dula was nevertheless convicted and, although he was given a new trial on appeal, Dula was convicted again and hanged on May 1, 1868. To the end of his life, Vance maintained that Dula was innocent. This high–profile murder is the subject of the folk song "Tom Dooley".

=== Fourteenth Amendment ===
Vance and other former Confederates were banned from returning to public office by the Fourteenth Amendment of 1868. Vance was depressed during this period and resented this limitation, especially since the same amendment that kept him out of the politics he loved also granted African American men citizenship and full political rights. Around 1868, he began supporting Conservative Party politicians, using racist dialogue to gain other supporters.

In February 1868, Vance attended the North Carolina Conservation Convention, also called the Rebel Convention, in Raleigh. The Dailey Standard noted that the convention was noteworthy for its hatred of the government and formerly enslaved people. After many calls from the attendees for him to speak, Vance spontaneously talked about his lack of prejudice toward the formerly enslaved, commending their conduct and fidelity during the war. However, he affirmed his belief that only educated whites should vote in the South.

In 1870, the North Carolina legislature appointed Vance to the United States Senate, but because of the Fourteenth Amendment, he was not eligible to serve unless authorized by a two-thirds majority vote in both houses of Congress. Joseph Abbott, the Republican US Senator from North Carolina since its readmission into the Union until March 3, 1871, petitioned the United States Senate Committee on Privileges and Elections to refuse to seat Vance because of his support for the Confederacy. Since the 14th Amendment allows for relief from such disability upon 2/3 vote of both houses of Congress, Vance spent more than a year unsuccessfully petitioning the Republican-dominated Senate to seat him. However, out of concern that such Committee might end up seating Abbott, in March 1872 Vance resigned his Certificate of Election, thus liberating the North Carolina Legislature to elect another Democrat to remainder of his US Senate term, which it did.

=== Lecture circuit ===
While he was kept out of politics, Vance earned income in the lecture circuit. His first important lecture was "The Duties of Defeat" which he gave at the University of North Carolina's commencement on June 7, 1866. Shortly afterward, he was speaking in venues ranging from county fairs to large lecture halls in Philadelphia, New Orleans, and Baltimore. By the early 1870s, Vance had a national reputation as an outstanding platform speaker. His style "was peculiarly his own". He had a remarkable ability to adapt "to every type of audience using local illustrations and interest, and his keen, sparkling wit... Like Lincoln, Vance was one of the few men who could successfully combine incessant jocularity with seriousness and get credit for seriousness". Some of his popular speeches were "The Humorous Side of Politics" and "The Demagogue". He also discussed the aspects of the Civil War in "The Last Days of the War in North Carolina" and "The Political and Social South During the War".

==== Speaking out against antisemitism ====
Starting around 1870, Vance gave a speech called "Scattered Nation" hundreds of times, praising Jews and calling for religious tolerance and justice. Although Vance's motives for "Scattered Nation" are not fully known, it was not for political gain as there were fewer than 500 Jews in North Carolina at the time and antisemitism was common. One modern writer suggests Vance's perspective may have been impacted by his involvement with Freemasonry as this organization accepted Jews. Historian Leonard Rogoff, president of Jewish Heritage North Carolina, also notes that Vance established a relationship with Samuel Wittkowsky, a Jew and fellow Mason. When Vance was arrested, he was physically unable to walk to the train station and was only offered a mule by the federal troops; Vance was rescued from this humiliation by Wittkowsky, who gave Vance a ride in his wagon. The two men's later friendship may have impacted Vance's perspective.

Yet, within the "Scattered Nation" call for tolerance to Jews, Vance also made his prejudices clear, saying, "[In] contrast to the Jews, the 'African negro' had contributed nothing to...the civilization of mankind" and that "laws and partisan courts alike have been used to force [African American men] into an equality with those whom he could not equal."

=== Governor, 3rd term ===
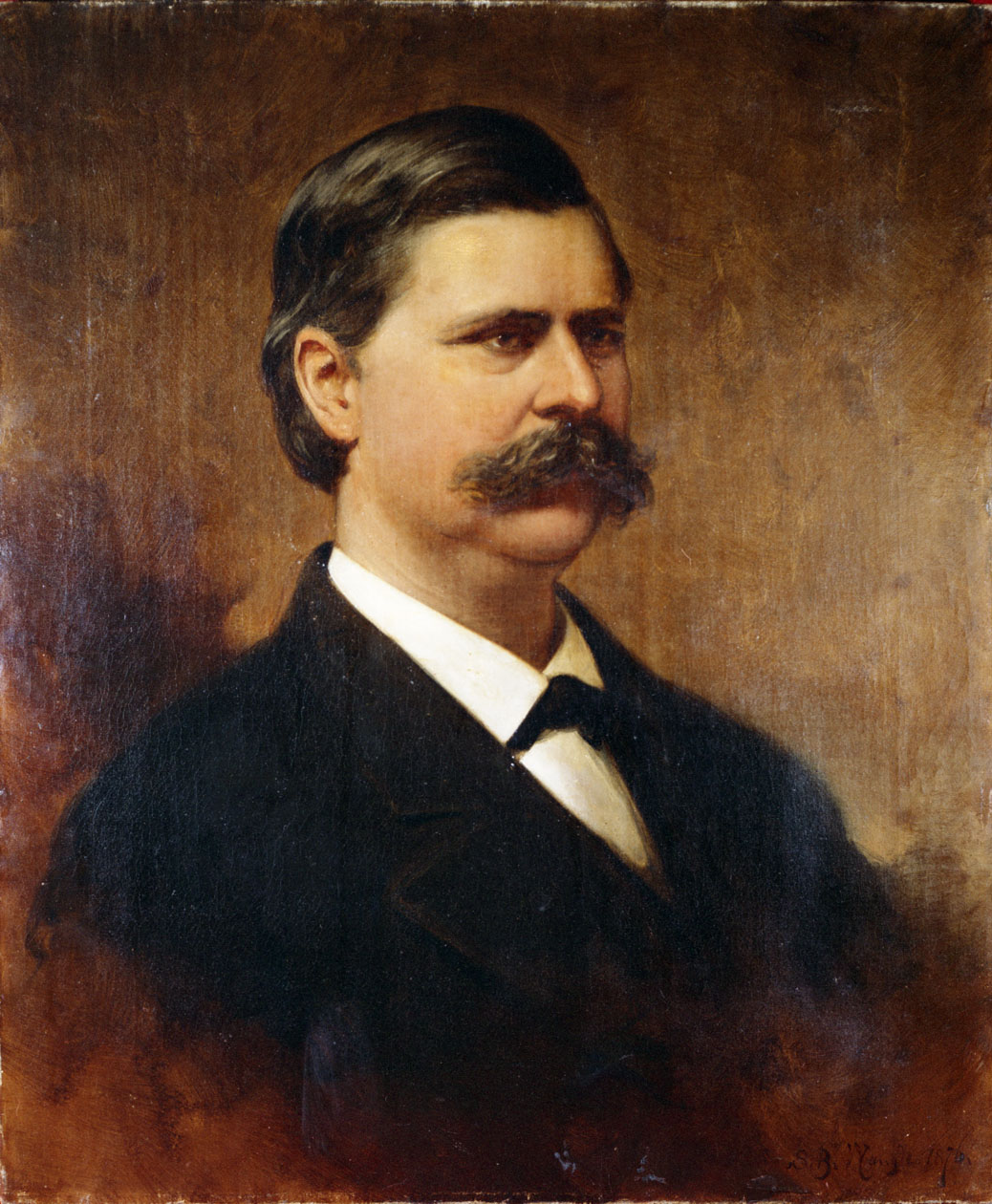
Vance, c. 1877–1879 painting in the North Carolina State Archives

In 1875, President Ulysses S. Grant signed an amnesty bill that included Vance. Vance ran for an open seat in the U.S. Senate but lost to Augustus Merrimon. In 1876, Vance was elected to his third term of Governor as North Carolina. However, he only served two years of the four-year term. His swearing-in in 1877 was accompanied by festivities that began a tradition of lavish gubernatorial inaugurations in the state.

==== Education ====
As a postwar governor, Vance was considered progressive for his era. He proposed agricultural reforms, the expansion of teacher training through normal schools, and the addition of more public schools, including separate but equal access for African Americans. In his 1877 message to the legislature about creating normal schools, Vance says, "A school of a similar character should be established for the education of colored teachers, the want of which is more deeply felt by the black race even than the white. In addition to the fact that it is our plain duty to make no discrimination in the matter of public education...their desire for education is an extremely credible one, and should be gratified as far as our means will permit. In short, I regard it as an unmistakable policy to imbue these black people with a hearty North Carolina feeling and make them cease to look abroad for the aids to their progress and civilization, and the protection of their rights as they have been taught to do, and teach them to look to their State instead...."

Two years later, his message to the legislature announced that the board of education had created two normal schools—a summer institute at the University of North Carolina for white teachers and a new permanent institution, the State Colored Normal School, for black teachers at the Howard School in Fayetteville. The State Colored Normal School became Fayetteville State University.

==== Railroads ====
During his third term as governor, Vance brought the railroad to Western North Carolina, finally realizing his dream from the meeting at Cumberland Gap in 1853. In his first message to the legislature on January 13, 1877, he suggested that convicts should be sent to work on the Western North Carolina Railroad in McDowell County. Many of the state's convicts were freed slaves arrested under North Carolina's vagrancy laws which essentially allowed the imprisonment of those without jobs. Having found a free labor source, Vance then had to resolve a cash shortfall—the state did not have the funds to both equip and transport the convicts. He turned to J. E. Rankin, chair of the Buncombe County Commission, asking that local elites provide the needed $25,000. When Rankin sent a negative reply, Vance wrote a heated response. He then asked the Federal government.

Another problem facing Vance was that this railroad was the greatest engineering challenge east of the Rockies, requiring a climb of some 1,000 feet (300 m) in just over 3 miles (4.8 km). One modern historian notes that the Blue Ridge railroad project became Vance's "personal crusade." Despite his ambitious goal of completing the railroad in two years, Vance wanted the convicts to be treated well. In July 1877, he wrote the Penitentiary Board when he learned that convicts working on both the Chester & Lenoir Narrow Gauge Railroad and the Spartanburg and Asheville Railroad had been subjected to cruel treatment, including being overworked and whipped. Vance wrote that such conditions were "not to be tolerated for a moment" and requested immediate punishment of those who were guilty of "such disgraceful conduct." However, the state only provided seven cents a day to feed each convict and the schedule worked the men seven days a week.

Despite Vance's intervention, at least 125 of the 558 convicts died because of inclement weather, inadequate housing, lack of food, and dangerous working conditions such as the cave-ins and accidents at the Swannanoa Tunnel that killed 21 people. Guards also shot men trying to escape. Historian Gordan McKinney says, "This episode thereby qualifies as one of the most egregious industrial–construction disasters in Appalachian history." Yet, Vance continued to push for the grueling pace of work.

In his January 1879 address to the legislature, Vance acknowledged some problems with the convict labor program. However, he never acknowledged his role in the tragedy. What his voting public remembered was that the new railroad network transported supplies to farms and factories, and then to markets, helping to stimulate the economy across the state.

=== U.S. Senate ===
In 1878, Vance was again elected to the United States Senate, where he became a leader of the Democratic Party. Although Vance fought for Southern interests while in the Senate, he showed "little bitterness" towards the North. As a result, he helped unify Congress which was still struggling with the discord between North and South.

Vance was reelected to the Senate in 1885 and 1891, serving until he died in 1894. During his tenure, he chaired the United States Congressional Joint Committee on Enrolled Bills (46th United States Congress), chaired the United States Senate Committee on Privileges and Elections (52nd United States Congress and until his death during 53rd United States Congress), served on the joint committee of the library, and served on the finance committee during the McKinley Tariff debates.

==== Criticism of Reconstruction ====
In one of his earliest speeches before the Senate, Vance addressed an array of issues that had arisen during Reconstruction, in support of H.R. 2, which called for the removal of military oversight in Southern elections, the repeal of laws that gave Federal marshals control of Southern elections, and the removal of the requirement for Federal Court jurors to take the oath of allegiance. Vance said:

Peace then came—no, not peace, but the end of war came—no not the end of war, but the end of legitimate, civilized war, and for three years you dallied with us. One day we were treated as though we were in the Union, and as though we had legitimate State governments in operation; another day, we were treated as though we were out of the Union, and our State governments were rebellious usurpations...You deposed our State governments and ejected from office every official, from Governor to township constable. and remitted us to a state of chaos...You disenfranchised at least ten percent of our citizens, embracing the wisest, best, and most experienced. You enfranchised slaves, the lowest and most ignorant; and you placed them over them as leaders of a class of men who have attained to the highest positions of infamy known to modern ages...

The new governments went to work, and in a short space of four years, they plundered those eleven Southern States to the extent of $262,000,000; that is to say, they took all that we had that was amenable to larceny...It would be well enough for Republican leaders to remember that the inflexible law of compensation exists in politics as well as in other things...If we violate the laws of health we suffer bodily pains or early dissolution; if we violate the laws of society we suffer in public esteem; if we violate the laws of man we are subject to its pains and penalties; if we violate the laws of God, we will suffer the penalties of sin; if we violate the laws of nature we can reap none of the benefits which our knowledge of them now enables us to derive therefrom. So it is in politics....

Later on in his speech, Vance asked, "Was it the Union you fought for or political supremacy?" He pointed out that the nation has benefitted from the leadership of other political parties. He also said, "To suppose the States are either unable, unwilling, or too corrupt to hold peaceful and honest elections, is to declare unmistakably that the people therein are incapable of self-government...For one, I can say, with unspeakable pride and absolute truth, that the people of North Carolina who sent me here are able, willing, and virtuous enough to fulfill these and all other higher functions of government; that they have ever done so since the keels of Raleigh's ships first grated upon the white sands of her shores; and God helping them, they and their children will continue to do so, if not destroyed by centralization..."

Vance also supported the Blair Education Bill, which requested federal funding to help educate the freed slaves in the South. Although, Vance says, "I admit that there is no special provision in the constitution or perhaps one looking directly toward it for public education. But the men who formed the constitution had no idea that there would be the great civil war that occurred. They had no idea that 500,000 slaves would be liberated by that war, and still less of an idea that the 500,000 slaves would be forced into...absolute equality of citizenship...They had no idea that their institutions and work of their hand would ever be committed to ignorant and unlettered Africans for protection and preservation." Vance also pointed out North Carolina's successes in creating schools to educate the freed slaves.

In a speech on January 30, 1890, regarding Senate Bill 1121, which authorized people of color to emigrate from Southern states, Vance came close to speaking against slavery, saying, "Those of us in the South who had deprecated the war and deplored the agitation which led to it, as we sat in the ashes of our own homes and scraped ourselves with potsherds of desolation, yet consoled ourselves for the slaughter of our kindred and the devastation of our fields by the reflection that this, at least, was the end; that the great original wrong committed by our fathers had at last been atoned for...." [emphasis added]

Nonetheless, Vance's racial views showed when he talked about Reconstruction. He said, "The truth is, he [the former slave] began to prosper when the [Southern] whites took control. Progress for him would have been impossible under his own rule as it was for the whites. Ten more years of such government as reconstruction fixed upon the South would have made the fairest portion of the American continent a wilderness. In short, it would have been Africanized..." However, Vance was "glad to say that North Carolina is one of the States in the South where there is the least complaint of infringement of the colored man's rights, either at the ballot box or in the courts of justice...That there are instances of mistreatment and occasionally of cruelty to the negros now and then occurring in the South I candidly admit and regret."

Vance also outlined his vision of the future, with a bit of sarcasm:

The millennium has not yet arrived in the land of reconstruction; the reign of perfect righteousness, of absolute justice, has not yet been established south of Mason and Dixon's line, though of course, it is in full operation north of that imaginary division. There is no suppression of the popular vote by jerrymander or otherwise; there is no purchase of the floating vote in blocks of five, no ejection of colored children from white schools or colored men from theaters and barbers chairs, and where we may hope that, in the process of time and in the spread of intelligence and increased appreciation for the virtues of the negroes, one black man may soon be sent to Congress from the North; that some railroad attorney or millionaire will make room in the Senate of the United States for the colored brother; that one colored postmaster for a white town may be appointed in the North; that in the State of Kansas, the soil so prolific in friendships for the colored man, a respectable negro, duly nominated on the Republican ticket, may receive the full vote of his party, and not be scratched almost to the point of defeat by those who love him, as he was in Topeka; that one accomplished colored man may be sent abroad to represent his country in some other land than Hayti [sic] or Liberia.

In reality, Vance believed in white supremacy. He said, "I am not only willing but anxious to have justice done them in everything, and to do all that may be required of me to aid them [former slaves] in the difficulties of their position; but I am not willing that they should rule my people."

==== Farmers' Alliance ====
Vance also faced a political challenge with the Farmers' Alliance in North Carolina. Some claimed Vance made concessions with this organization to gain reelection to the Senate because the Farmers' Alliance essentially served as a third political party at the time. On the flip side, Vance was accused of being insincere in his dealings with the Farmers' Alliance, such as introducing a bill on their behalf with no effort made towards getting it passed. However, from the beginning, Vance tended to side with the masses, including the farming class. In addition, both Vance and the farmers agreed on the Sherman Antitrust Act.

Furthermore, the organization's origins in North Carolina started with Vance. Because Vance was against tariffs which he felt enriched the few and impoverished the many, he encouraged North Carolina's farmers to organize so they could collectively defend themselves against outside forces. Later, he introduced Senate Bill 2806, aka the sub-treasury scheme, at the request of North Carolina's first Commissioner of Agriculture, Leonidas L. Polk, who had become president of the National Farmers' Alliance and Industrial Union. However, after investigating the sub-treasury scheme, Vance came to believe that it was both impracticable and unconstitutional.

Although he was not on board for this solution to the farmer's needs, Vance nevertheless praised the Farmer's Alliance in correspondence to its president, noting, "For the past six months there has been more discussion upon the condition of the farmer and matters pertaining to their interests than have taken place within ten years prior. The more of this talk, the better for the farmers. Their wrongs are so palpable that the justice of readdressing them will become more and more irresistible as the light is turned on. The policy of the farmers, being right now, is to keep within the right. Demand nothing that is illegal, ask nothing that is unreasonable." Vance also hinted that the sub-treasury scheme could be harmful to him and that the farmers should stand by their friend.

When the North Carolina legislature stated that their appointed senator for the 1891 term should vote for the sub-treasury scheme, Vance "positively and emphatically declined" to agree to be elected under such constraints. Rather than give up Vance, the legislature reworded their instructions to request that Vance "use all honorable means" to secure financial reforms. Yet Vance was loath to accept any such conditions. In a letter written to a member of the legislature on April 1, 1897, Thomas J. Jarvis said, "There is no power on earth that could induce Vance to have accepted an office under conditions which he felt could be justly held to forfeit the affection and high esteem in which he is held to the people of his State."

Vance, who was dealing with poor health at the time, wrote a letter, rather than speaking in public, about the need for Democrats to fight the Republicans who want to limit rights given by the Constitution. Vance stated that the "situation is most critical" and cautioned against splitting the Democratic Party into two parties as this would only benefit the Republicans. Vance also reminds everyone, "Since I have been your representative in the Senate I have both spoken and voted against that unjust legislation. At home, as you know, I never ceased to expose inequalities and to advise farmers to organize for resistance to it...My unfaltering confidence is in the true farmers of North Carolina, who as members of the Alliance will, I trust, not permit their noble order and their just cause to be perverted and debased."

==== National issues ====
"The Administration Sawmill" political cartoon by Joseph Keppler, with Vance at the far left and President Cleveland at the sawmill. From Puck magazine, February 1886

"Snowed In" political cartoon by Joseph Keppler showing a snowstorm depositing silver coins at the Capitol and the Department of Treasury with Vance and others gathering coins for a snowball fight. From Puck magazine, January 1886.

In national politics, Vance generally supported conservative President Grover Cleveland. He made a speech in North Carolina saying:

Many of our people, it is true, have objected to Mr. Cleveland and preferred that he should not have been nominated. I confess that I was among that number. But an individual preference before the nomination of a candidate is one thing and the duty of a true man after that nomination has been fairly made is another and very different thing indeed...If we refuse to abide by the voice of the majority of our fellow Democrats, freely and unmistakably expressed in friendly convention, there is an end of all associated party effort in the government of our country; if we personally participate in that...convention and then refuse to abide by the decision of its tribunal...then there is an end of all personal honor among all men, and the confidence which is necessary to all combined efforts is forever gone.

Vance opposed important legislation of the era such as the McKinley Tariff, civil service programs, the internal revenue service, and the repeal of the Sherman Silver Purchase Act—gaining a reputation as an opposition senator. Vance was also against capitalistic monopolies and the government purchasing railroads and telegraph lines, as well as a monopoly by national banks. However, he did not believe railroads or other non-government entities should be allowed to own more public land than was needed for their primary function.

Vance supported increasing the volume of currency and silver coinage; at the time, the amount of paper and coin money released could not exceed the gold in the treasury. Vance made his last speech in the Senate on September 1, 1893, speaking against House Bill 1, regarding the unconditional repeal of the Sherman Silver Purchase Act that was approved in 1890. Although noticeably weakened from illness, Vance spoke for two hours and gave what many consider the best speech of his career. Early in the speech, Vance simply explains, "When money is abundant prices are high; when money is scarce the prices of all products are low. Therefore, he that increases the abundance of money benefits the production and enhances prices and wages, and he that contracts or diminishes the amount of this money depreciates everything which is for sale, including wages...The effect upon the well-being of mankind which would follow the destruction of one-half of this currency—it is impossible to accurately describe."

== Vance and the Ku Klux Klan ==
Following the Civil War, the Ku Klux Klan (KKK) emerged as an organization that engaged in terrorism and intimidation throughout the South, including North Carolina. Modern detractors and some modern biographers claim that Vance was a member of the Ku Klux Klan.

The first known source to connect the two is an affidavit from Thomas A. Hope of Lincoln County, North Carolina, submitted to the US Congress's Joint Select Committee to Inquire into the Condition of Affairs in the Late Insurrectionary States, which published its report in 1872. In his affidavit, Hope states, "[I] frequently heard it talked among the KKK members that Z. B. Vance was the chief of the State; do not know this of my own knowledge, have only heard it talked of."

In her 1924 self-published book, Authentic History Ku Klux Klan, 1865–1877, Susan Lawrence Davis states that Vance was the Grand Dragon of the Ku Klux Klan for North Carolina. Davis had a history of fakery and appears to have plagiarized a 1906 historical romance novel by Thomas Dixon Jr. when writing her nonfiction Klan history. Modern experts note other discrepancies in Authentic History, including fabricated descriptions of Klan costumes, giving reason to question any claims she made about Vance.

Davis's report of Vance's association with the Klan is repeated by more reputable authors, such as historian Stanly Fitzgerald Horn's Invisible Empire: The Story of the Ku Klux Klan, 1866–1871. Horne writes, "Ex-Governor Zebulon Baird Vance was generally supposed to be the Grand Dragon of the Realm, and the testimony of the confessed Ku Klux was to the effect that within the Klan Vance was generally looked upon as the chief of state."

In the 2004 biography, Zeb Vance: North Carolina's Civil War Governor and Gilded Age Political Leader, Gordon McKinney writes that Vance did publicly discuss the KKK in 1870 after a series of Ku Klux Klan incidents in Orange County, North Carolina. The statement issued by Vance reads: "I opposed the Ku Klux from the start...refusing to have anything to do with such an organization on the grounds that it was a secret society...I not only refused to approve of it but made a speech in a certain county against such organizations."

In a review of Vance's writings of the era, historian Milton Ready notes, "[Vance] embraced the racial stereotypes of the time that deemed newly freed blacks inferior. Yet he loathed the Reconstruction-era Ku Klux Klan, condemning its members as cowards and 'ruffians,' its intimidating methods as unlawful."

Regardless of what Vance was writing or saying, historian Joe T. Mobley says it is important to consider Vance's "acquiescence to the violence of the Ku Klux Klan during Reconstruction." Vance also capitalized on "the tension created by the Klan in the mountain region to help the Conservatives sweep the western counties."

== Personal life ==
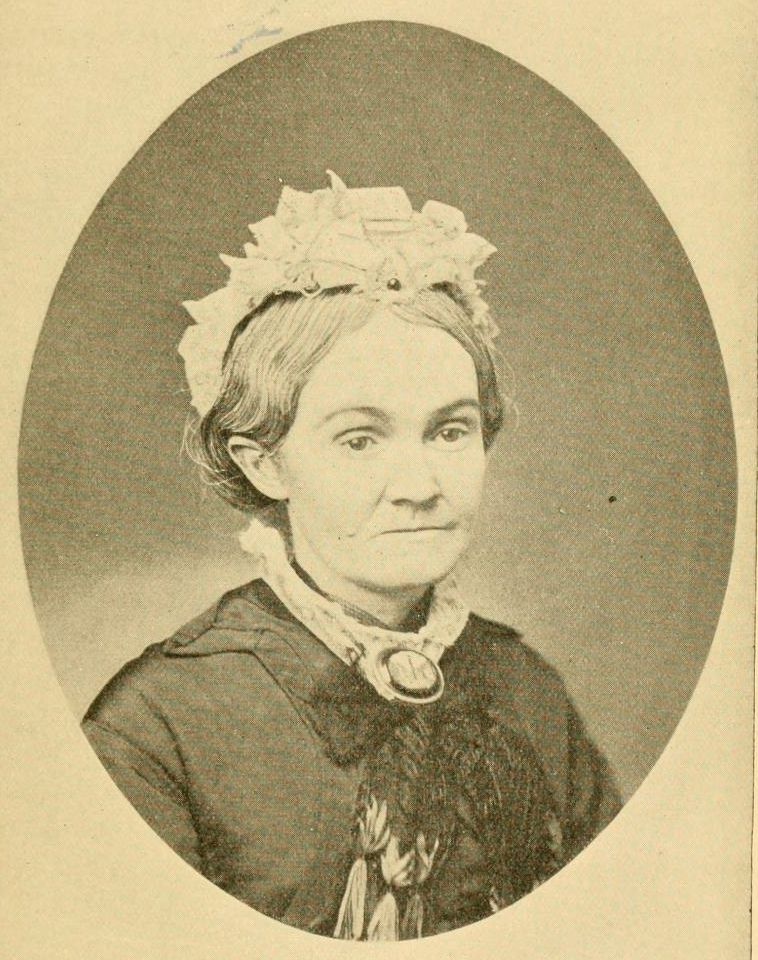
Harriett Espy Vance, 1878

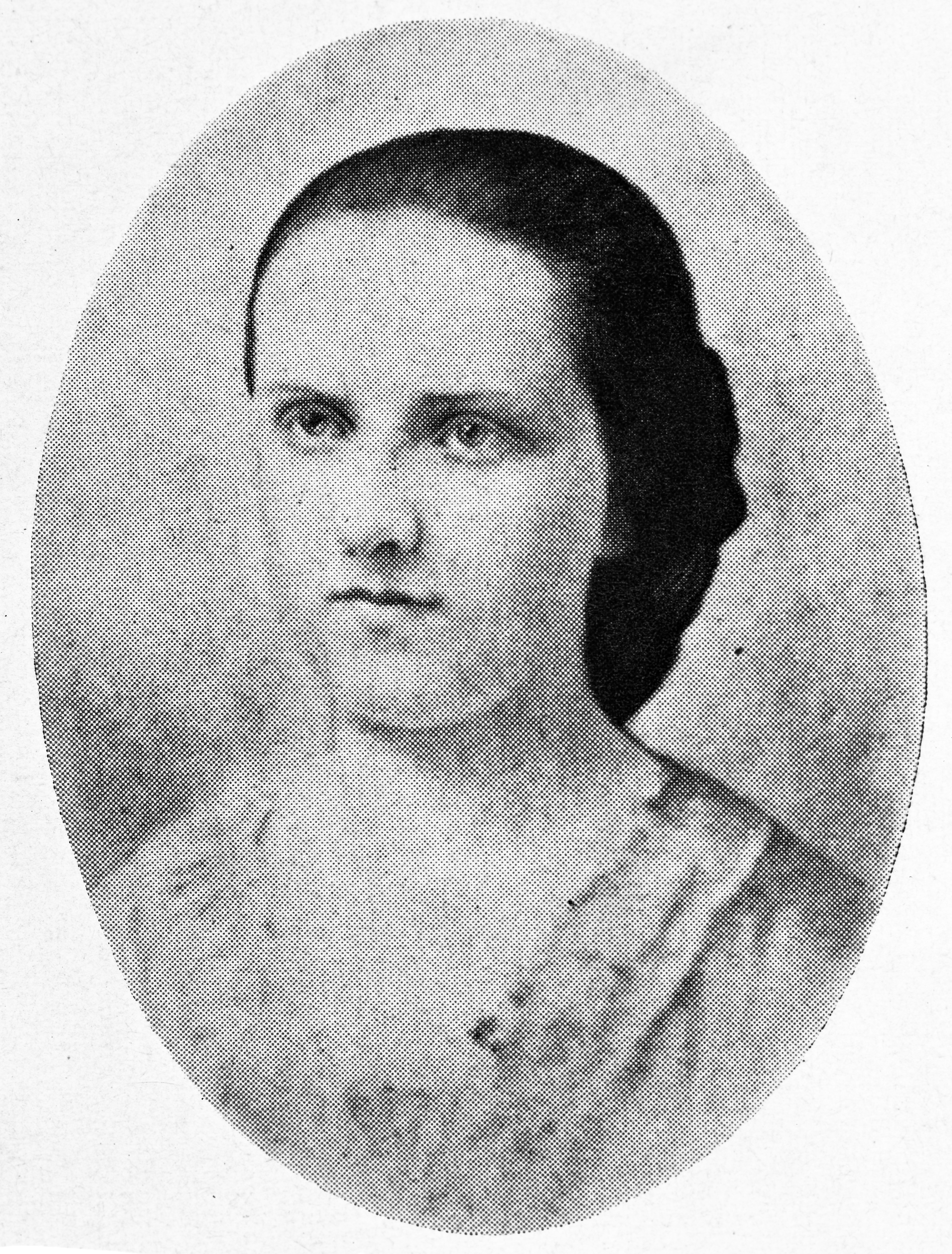
Florence Steele Martin Vance

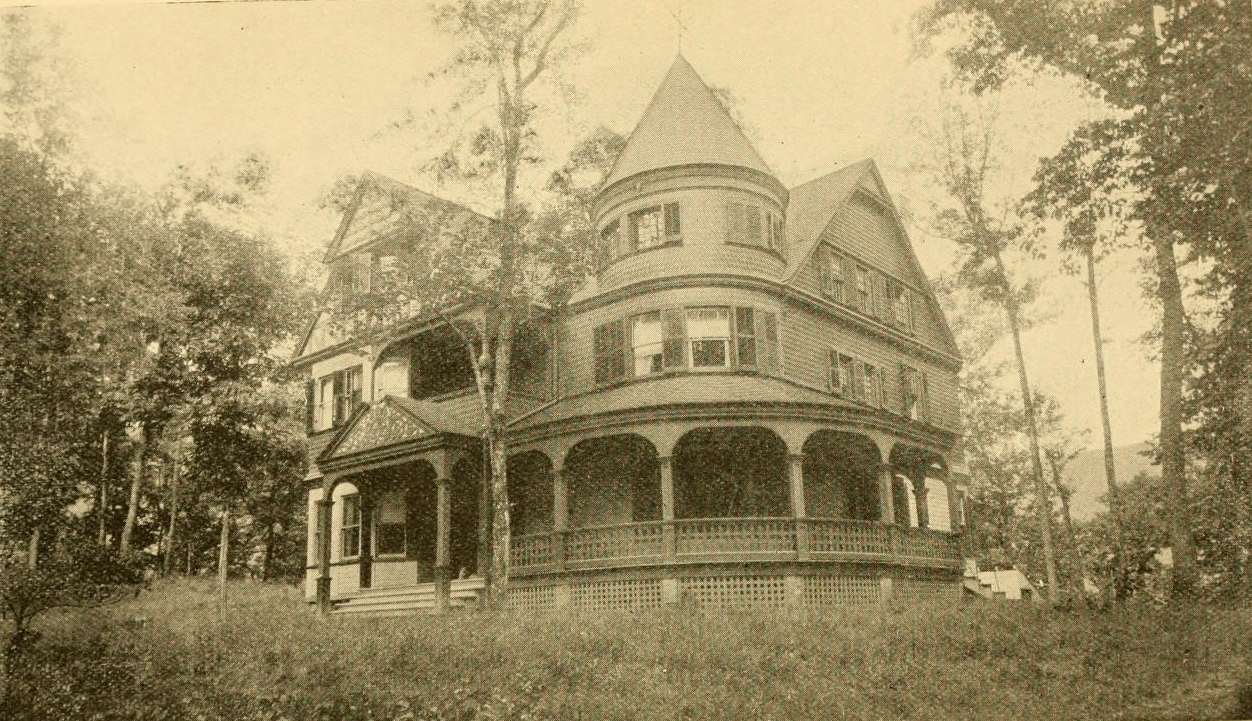
Gombroom, Black Mountain, North Carolina in the 19th–century

Around 1851, Vance began to court Harriett "Hattie" Newell Espy, the orphaned daughter of Presbyterian minister Robert Espy. After he had passed the Bar and started a law practice, Vance married Harriett at Quaker Meadows, the home of her uncle Charles McDowell in Burke County, North Carolina on August 3, 1853. They had five sons: Robert Espy Vance (born 1854, died young), Charles Noel Vance (born 1856), David Mitchell Vance (born 1857), Zebulon Baird Vance Jr. (born 1860), and Thomas Malvern Vance (born 1862). The family lived on a 5 acres (20,000 m^{2}) lot in Asheville, North Carolina, purchased for $2,300 which came from Hattie's dowry. Vance enslaved six people—Isaac, Julia, Hannah, Marion, and two unnamed children—who cleaned the house, cooked, maintained the garden, did laundry, and helped rear the Vance children.

Vance joined the Mt. Hermon Lodge No. 118 Ancient Free and Accepted Masons in Asheville, reaching the degree of Master Mason on June 20, 1853. When he moved to Charlotte after the Civil War, Vance attended Phalanx Lodge No. 31. That lodge quickly grew in size with Vance's membership. In 1867, Vance co-founded the Excelsior Lodge No. 261 as the second lodge in Charlotte with Samuel Wittkowsky. However, Excelsior Lodge records show Vance as "Resident Mason—Not Member."

Vance was also one of the nineteen original stakeholders in the Asheville Cemetery Company which purchased land and hired landscape architect Charles T. Colyer to create Riverside Cemetery. In return, Vance received twenty grave plots and his choice of location within the cemetery.

Vance donated to keep the University of North Carolina operating. In 1875 when the university reopened after the war, he was asked to be its president, following in the footsteps of former Governor David Lowry Swain. However, Vance declined the offer. He said, "No, say to my friends that it would kill me in a few weeks to be obliged to behave as is required for a college president in order to furnish an example to the boys." He was a member of the Southern Historical Society, serving as its vice-president of North Carolina around 1873.

In February 1865, Vance had a stroke that caused temporary paralysis and "the muscles of the left cheek and eye to occasionally jerk and twitch...." In October 1878, the Vances moved into a residence on Fayetteville Street in Raleigh, the former home of Kemp P. Battle. Vance joined the church for the first time at the age of 48, choosing his wife's Presbyterian church. However, his wife Harriett died on November 3, 1878, after a long and painful illness, just one month after the death of Vance's mother. A train took Harriett's remains back to Asheville to be buried at Riverside Cemetery.

On January 21, 1880, Vance met Florence Steele Martin while attending a ball at the Riggs House hotel in Washington, D.C. Martin was a wealthy Catholic widow from Louisville, Kentucky, with a twelve-year-old son. When she returned home three weeks later, the two were engaged. Based on the more than 100 letters Vance sent her over the next four months, this was a love match. Vance told a friend that Mrs. Martin was perfect for him except for her religion. He wrote, "Think of it! What will my Presbyterian friends say to me?" In reality, there were legitimate concerns that her religion could negatively impact his political career, but Vance was not deterred. They married on June 17, 1880, some six months after meeting, in Oldham County, Kentucky at the home of her mother, Mrs. Samuel Steele. They did not have any children.

The couple lived at 1627 Massachusetts Avenue in Washington, D.C., but also started building a house called Gombroom in Black Mountain, North Carolina. To fund Gombroom, Vance used his wife's money and sold land in downtown Asheville that he inherited from his mother. Vance was embarrassed that his new wife had more money than he did. Weeks before their wedding, he wrote her, "Tell them [her family] the simple truth about me Darling, as I told it to you—that I am a poor man & ever likely to be. You may boast of nothing for me except my love for you. ...I do hope they will all learn to love me." Nevertheless, Gombroon was completed in 1887 and became their main home when Vance's health declined. Surrounded by forests, it was "the ideal retreat in the mountains of North Carolina" and had gardens, orchards, and vineyards, along with a dairy, springhouse, and other outbuildings.

In 1890, at the age of sixty, Vance gave more speeches than in any other year of his life. His nervous affliction from his previous stroke became worse, and back in Black Mountain, he fell from a wagon. His doctors feared he would go blind if they did not surgically remove one eye to save the other. The surgery was performed in early 1891, but he never returned to full health. Vance told William B. Bate, whom he sat next to in the Senate, "Misfortunes have their blessings, for surely no man can now deny that I have an eye single to the interests of my constituents."

In a kindness not always seen by political opponents, the entire Senate voted to pay for a private secretary for Vance from their contingency funds. However, Vance's health continued to decline from 1890 through 1894. As travel was believed to be curative in the 19th century, he visited Egypt, England, France, Germany, Ireland, Italy, and Scotland. Vance told his son that he "was home-sick while abroad and that the trip had made him a better American." In January 1894, he visited Jacksonville, Tampa, St. Augustine, and Suwannee Springs in Florida while the Senate was in session. When he returned to Washington, D.C., in April 1894, he could no longer walk.

=== Death and funeral ===
On April 14, 1894, Vance had another stroke, went into a coma, and died at his home in Washington, D.C.

Services were held in the Senate chamber on April 16, 1894, which were attended by President Grover Cleveland, Vice President Adlai Stevenson, Chief Justice of the Supreme Court Melville Fuller and all but one of the associate justices, Secretary of State Walter Q. Gresham, Secretary of the Treasury John G. Carlisle, Attorney General Richard Olney, Post Master General Wilson S. Bissell, Secretary of the Navy Hilary A. Herbert, Secretary of the Interior M. Hoke Smith, Secretary of Agriculture Julius Sterling Morton, the Speaker of the House Charles Frederick Crisp, and members of both the House of Representatives and Senate. The ambassador from England Sir Julian Paunceforte, other members of the diplomatic corps, and Bishop John J. Keane of Catholic University also attended. For the service, Vance's desk and chair were draped in black, and the floral decorations included pine to represent North Carolina. The service was followed by a funeral procession to the Pennsylvania Railroad Station.

Next, a funeral train took Vance's body to Raleigh, North Carolina, for another service, and from there to Asheville, North Carolina for burial. He was accompanied by seven congressmen (John S. Henderson, William T. Crawford, and Sydenham B. Alexander of North Carolina; John C. Black of Illinois; Elijah V. Brookshire of Indiana; Luther M. Strong of Ohio; and Charles Daniels of New York), six senators (Matt W. Ransom of North Carolina, James Z. George of Mississippi, George Gray of Delaware, Joseph Clay Stiles Blackburn of Kentucky, Fred DuBois of Idaho, and William E. Chandler of New Hampshire), the Secretary of the Senate William Ruffin Cox, and family members. In Raleigh, the group was joined by Governor Elias Carr, former Governor Thomas Jordan Jarvis, North Carolina Attorney General Frank I. Osborne, state North Railroad Commissioner James W. Wilson, North Carolina Secretary of State Octavius Coke, State Treasurer Samuel McDowell Tate, Auditor of North Carolina R. M. Furman, Judge Alphonso Calhoun Avery of the North Carolina Supreme Court, Richard Henry Battle who was Vance's personal secretary during his governorship, former North Carolina. Attorney General Thomas S. Kenan, The News & Observer owner Josephus Daniels, Edward J. Hale of The Fayetteville Observer, and many others.

Thousands of people lined the railroad tracks "to pay their last respects to one whom they loved and admired very much" as the funeral train headed south and west and stopped at towns and cities such as Richmond, Danville, Greensboro, Durham, and Raleigh. Thousands passed through the railroad car to pay their respects, filling it with a variety of flowers. Once the train arrived in Asheville, there were funeral services at First Presbyterian Church. Surviving members of Vance's Rough and Ready Guard led a procession of 710 carriages from the church to Riverside Cemetery where nearly 10,000 mourners attended his funeral and burial, including people he formerly enslaved. In 1890, the total population of Asheville was 10,235.

In his eulogy, former Governor Thomas Jordan Jarvis said, "He was the Mount Mitchell of all our great men, and in the affections and love of the people, he towered above them all. As ages to come will not be able to mar the grandeur and greatness of Mount Mitchell, so they will not be able to efface from the hearts and minds of the people the name of their beloved Vance."

Vance was buried by his first wife, Harriett, in Riverside Cemetery in the Vance family plot. Later, his second wife Florence had Vance moved to a grave in her family's plot in Riverside Cemetery. Vance's children, who were all born to his first wife, successfully petitioned to court to return Vance to his original burial site. Thus, Vance was buried three times in the same cemetery.

At the time of his death, Vance had $152.07 in the bank; when his effects and property were sold, his estate totaled less than $5,000.

== Honors ==
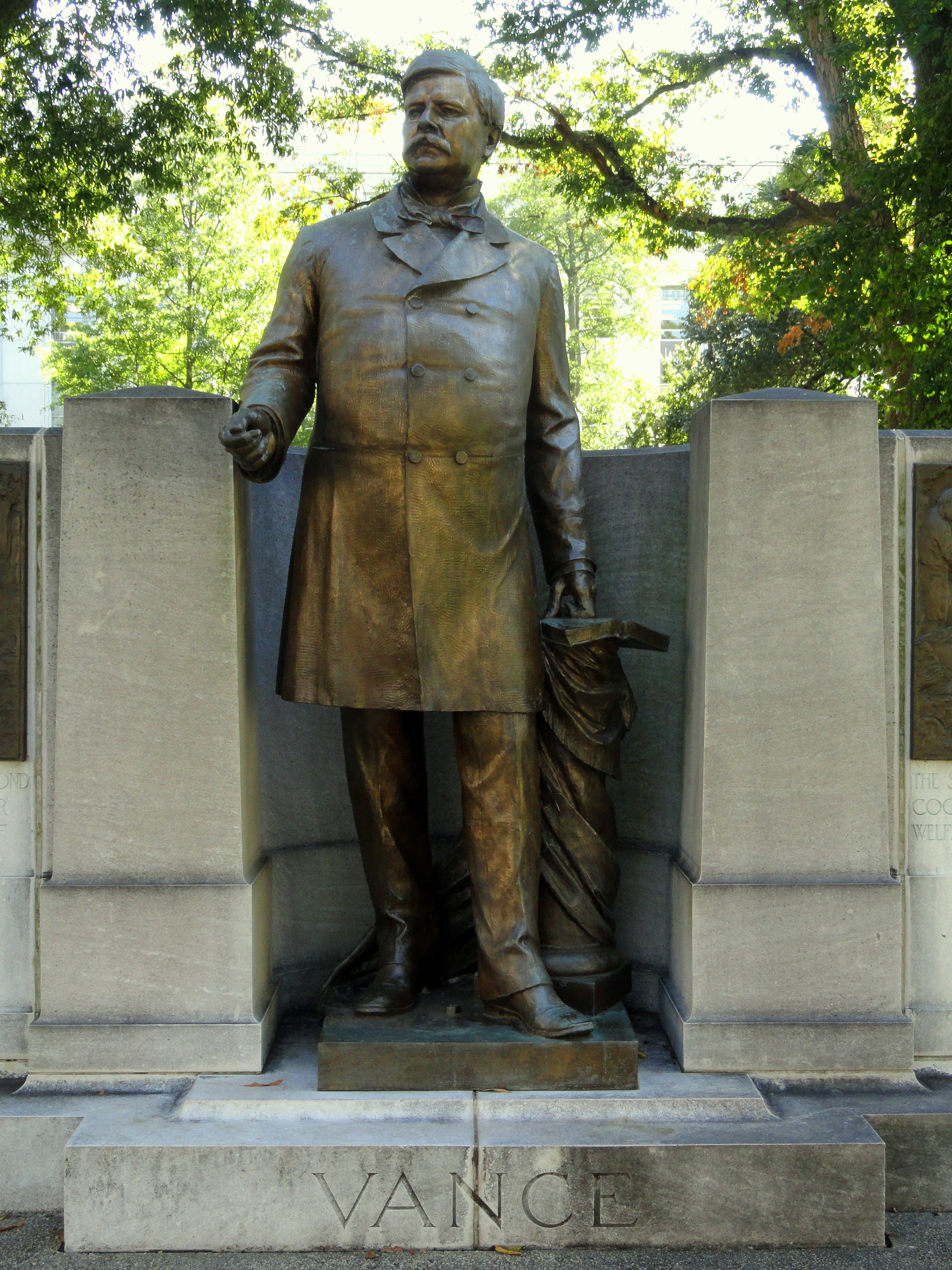
Vance statue by Henry Jackson Ellicott, Raleigh, North Carolina

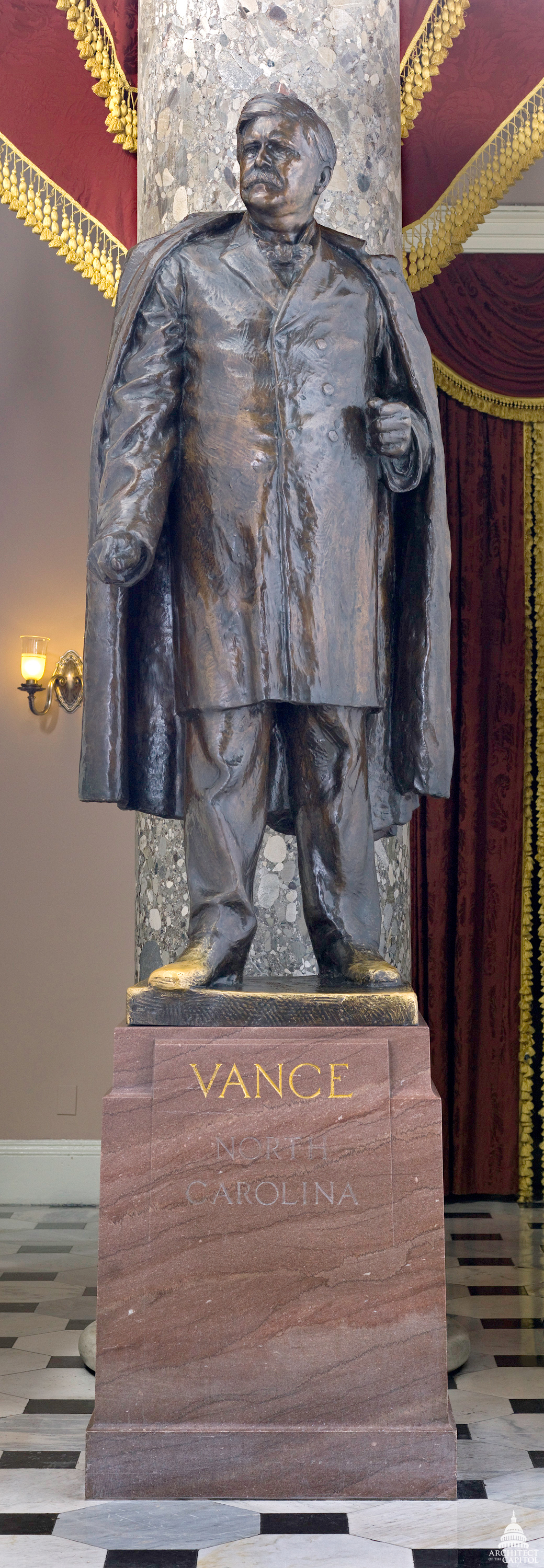
Vance statue by Gutzon Borglum, National Statuary Hall

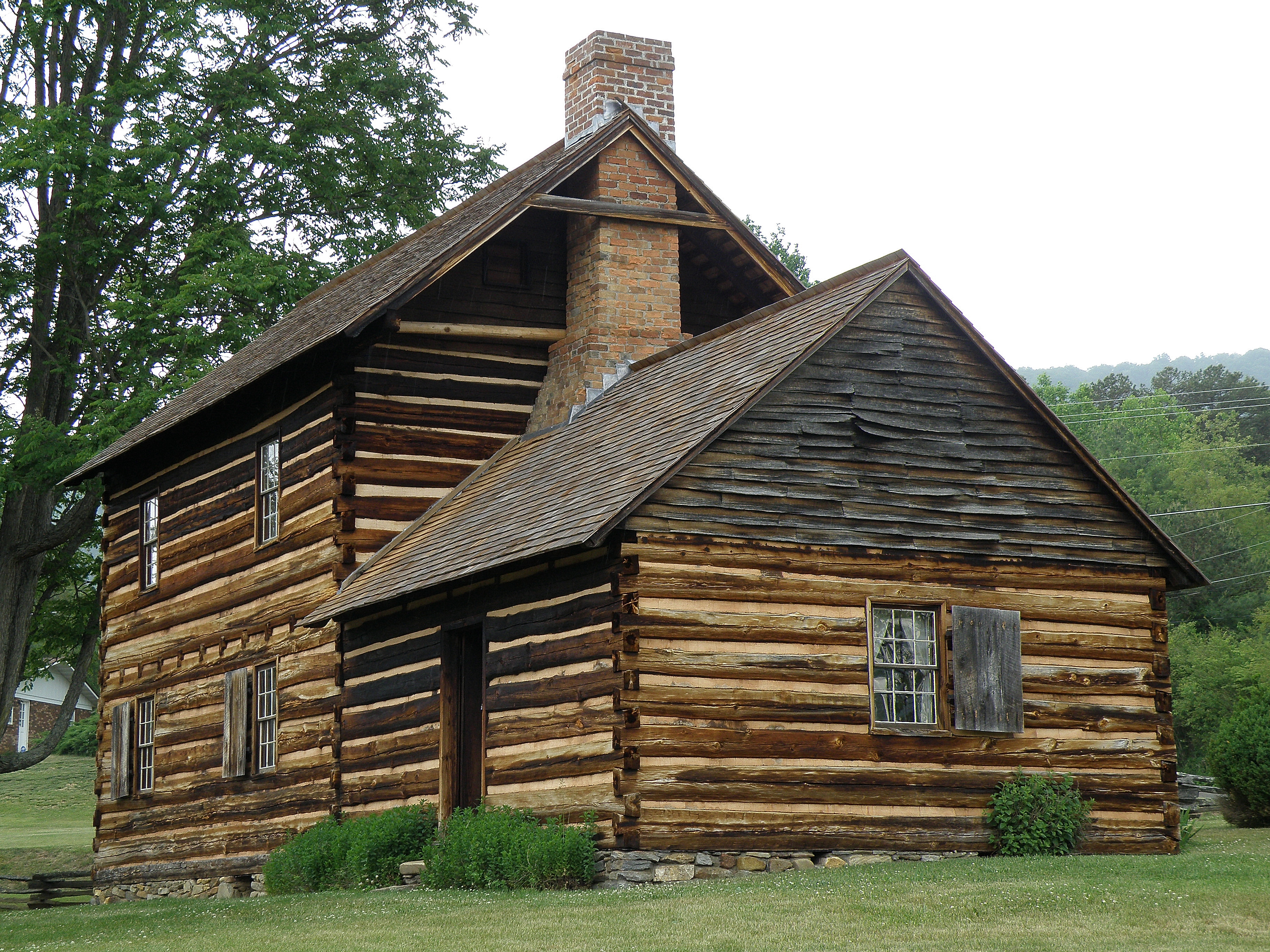
Reconstruction of the cabin at the Zebulon B. Vance Birthplace State Historic Site

In 1953, Frontis W. Johnston wrote, "North Carolina has loved, idolized, and rewarded no other man in her history as she has Zebulon Baird Vance." Johnston also states that North Carolina's towns "swarmed with literally hundreds of little Zebulons."

There are several monuments and memorials dedicated to Vance:

- The Salem College Chapel contains a stained-glass window given in honor of Vance by the Class of 1894.
- The Vance Monument, a 75 feet (23 m) granite obelisk was dedicated in Asheville, North Carolina in 1897 (demolished May 2021).
- A statue of Vance by Henry Jackson Ellicott was dedicated on the grounds of the North Carolina State Capitol in Raleigh on August 22, 1900. It was moved from its original pedestal and relocated to Raleigh's Union Square in 1949.
- A bronze statue of Vance by Gutzon Borglum was added to the National Statuary Hall Collection in Washington, D.C. in 1916.
- A small monument is located where his post-war home once stood at Sixth and College Streets, in Charlotte, North Carolina.
- The Asheville Lodge of the B'nai B'rith dedicated a memorial plaque to Vance at Calvary Episcopal Church in Fletcher, North Carolina on October 14, 1928. The plaque is mounted on a large granite boulder that is part of the Open–Air Westminster Abbey of the South.

Several locations, schools, and more bear Vance's name:

- Vance County, North Carolina was named in his honor in 1881.
- The town of Zebulon, in Wake County, North Carolina
- The town of Vanceboro in Craven County, North Carolina
- The World War II United States liberty ship SS Zebulon B. Vance
- Kerr-Vance Academy in Henderson, North Carolina
- Northern Vance High School in Henderson, North Carolina
- Vance Charter School in Henderson, North Carolina
- Vance County Early College High School in Henderson, North Carolina
- Vance County High School in Henderson, North Carolina
- Vance County Middle School in Henderson, North Carolina
- Vance Elementary in Asheville, North Carolina (name changed in February 2021).
- Vance Hall at the University of North Carolina at Asheville (name changed in 2020).
- Vance Hall at the University of North Carolina at Chapel Hill
- Zebulon B. Vance High School in Charlotte, North Carolina (name changed on October 13, 2020).
- Zeb Vance Elementary School in Kittrell, North Carolina
- Zeb Vance High School in Vance County, North Carolina (now closed).

There are many historic markers and historic sites about Vance:

- The Vance Birthplace is a State Historic Site in Weaverville, North Carolina.
- The Historic Vance House and Civil War Museum is located in Statesville, North Carolina in his former residence.
- The "Zeb Vance House" North Carolina State Highway Historical Marker is in Statesville, North Carolina.
- The "Zebulon B. Vance" North Carolina State Highway Historical Marker is in Buncombe County, North Carolina.
- The "Camp Vance" North Carolina State Highway Historical Marker is near Morganton, North Carolina.
- The "Brothers in Service" Civil War Trails marker in Weaverville, North Carolina is about Vance and his brother Robert.

Several organizations bear his name:

- Vance Masonic Lodge A.F.&A.M. No. 293 in Weaverville, North Carolina
- The Sons of Confederate Veterans Camp No. 15 is called the Zebulon Baird Vance Camp
- Vance Policy Institute think tank for Asheville and Buncombe County
- The Zeb Vance Ruritan Club in Kittrell, North Carolina
- The Henderson, North Carolina chapter of the United Daughters of the Confederacy is the Zeb Vance Chapter
- The United Confederate Veterans Camp No. 681 was called the Zebulon Vance Camp in his honor.
- Vance County Schools in Henderson, North Carolina

Also, on January 19, 1895, the United States Senate opened its floor for orations in his honor.

== Legacy ==
About Vance, F. Lane Williamson wrote, "Did he moderate his racial views in later years? Perhaps, but who knows? It's fair to say, though, that his legacy is that he set the stage for North Carolina to be perceived as at least somewhat more racially tolerant and culturally progressive than its Deep South neighbors, a tradition that held through the 20th–century and beyond until quite recently."

Samuel Wittkowsky, a Jewish intimate of Vance, wrote, "I speak for my race in North Carolina...the deceased has even by his words and writings demonstrated that he was their friend. His lecture on the Scattered Nation will ever remain green in the memory of my race, and will be one of the brightest jewels in his ever-liberal, fair, and untarnished escutcheon. And I venture the assertion that in the history of North Carolina, no Israelite has cast a vote against Z. B. Vance." Annually on Vance's birthday for more than 75 years, the Jewish organization, B'nai B'rith, and the United Daughters of the Confederacy held a joint ceremony and laid a galax wreath at the Vance Monument in Asheville. This event began in the late 1930s was discontinued in the early 2000s.

In 2004, author Sharyn McCrumb wrote the novel Ghost Riders with a fictionalized account of Vance's life told in the first person. She was also inspired to write The Ballad of Tom Dula because of Vance, saying "Despite his family's hard times after the early death of his father, Zeb Vance managed to get an education, read law, and get himself elected governor by the age of thirty. I thought that Vance could counteract the [negative Appalachian] stereotypes..."

Always a controversial political figure, Vance became even more of an issue in the early 21st century because of his connection to slavery and his history of racism. In September 2017, the University of North Carolina at Asheville's Department of History and the Zebulon B. Vance Birthplace State Historic Site held a two-day symposium, "Zebulon B. Vance Reconsidered." Kimberly Floyd, site manager of the Vance Birthplace and symposium co-convener said, "Zebulon Vance was a prominent figure in our state for four decades, and his is the story of both a hero and scoundrel." In August 2020, the board of trustees of the University of North Carolina at Asheville voted to rename Vance Hall because Vance "maintained racist stances that do not align with UNC Asheville's core values." In October 2020, the Charlotte–Mecklenburg Schools Board of Education voted to remove his name from its high school. In 2021, the City of Asheville and Buncombe County both voted to remove the Vance Monument from Pack Square in downtown Asheville. Also in 2021, Asheville City Schools changed the name of its Vance Elementary School.

== See also ==
- List of members of the United States Congress who died in office (1790–1899)
- List of monuments and memorials removed during the George Floyd protests

U.S. House of Representatives
Preceded by Thomas L. Clingman	Member of the U.S. House of Representatives from North Carolina's 8th congressional district 1858–1861	Vacant Title next held by Robert B. Vance; 1873
Political offices
Preceded by Henry Clark	Governor of North Carolina; 1862–1865	Succeeded by William Holden
Preceded by Curtis Brogden	Governor of North Carolina; 1877–1879	Succeeded by Thomas Jarvis
U.S. Senate
Preceded by Joseph Abbott	U.S. Senator-elect (Class 2) from North Carolina; 1871–1872; Not seated Served alongside: John Pool	Succeeded by Matt Ransom
Preceded by Augustus Merrimon	U.S. Senator (Class 3) from North Carolina; 1879–1894; Served alongside: Matt Ransom	Succeeded by Thomas Jarvis
Party political offices
Preceded by Augustus Merrimon	Democratic nominee for Governor of North Carolina; 1876	Succeeded by Thomas Jarvis
