= Philosemitism =

Affinity towards the Jewish people

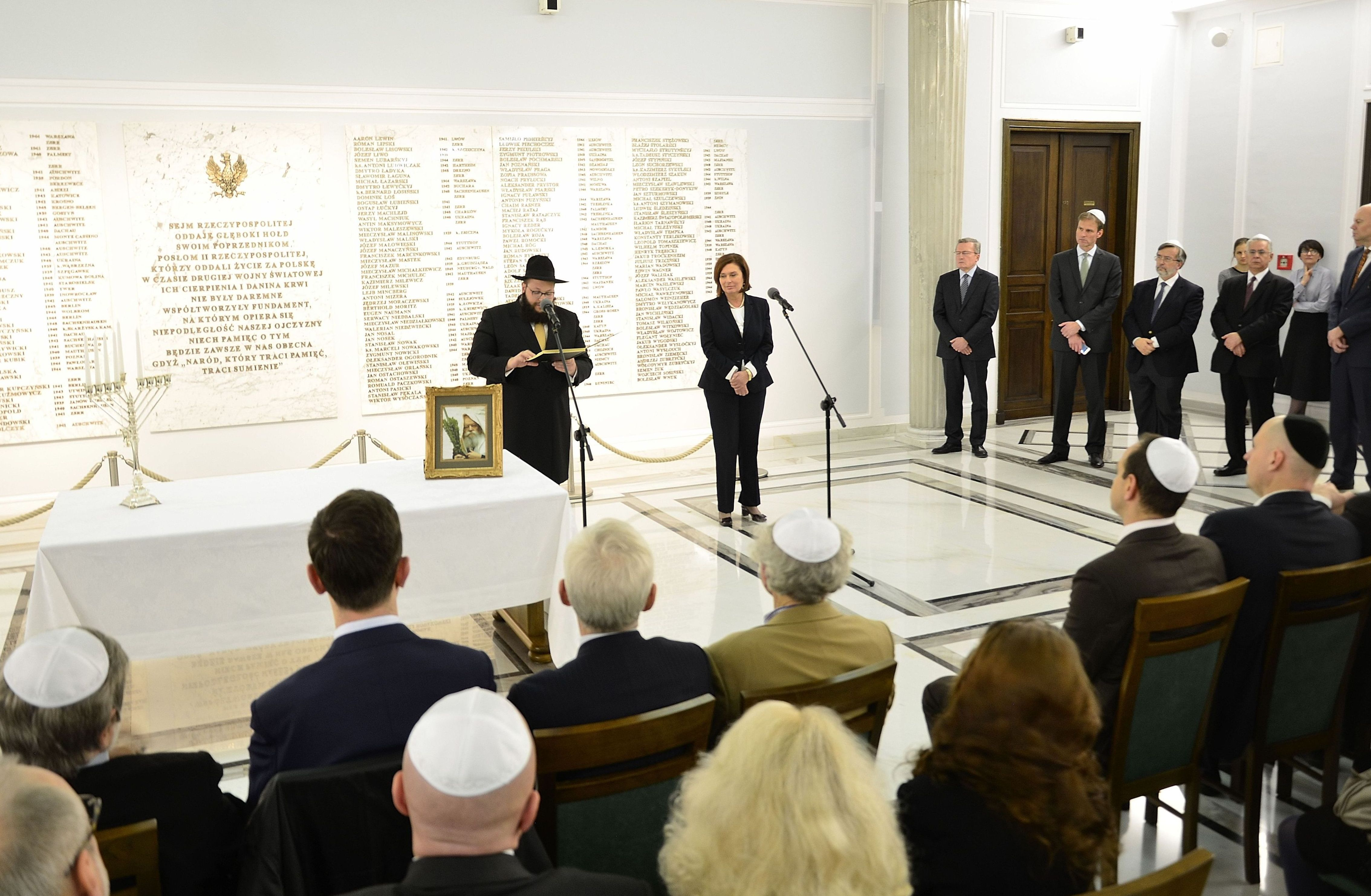
Celebration of Hanukkah at the Sejm in the city of Warsaw, 2015

Philosemitism, also called Judeophilia, is "defense, love, or admiration of Jews and Judaism". Such attitudes can be found in Western cultures across the centuries. The term originated in the nineteenth century by self-described German antisemites to describe their non-Jewish opponents. American-Jewish historian Daniel Cohen of the Vienna Wiesenthal Institute for Holocaust Studies has asserted that philosemitism "can indeed easily recycle antisemitic themes, recreate Jewish otherness, or strategically compensate for Holocaust guilt."

== Etymology ==
The controversial term "philosemitism" arose as a pejorative in Germany to describe the positive prejudice towards Jews; in other words, a philosemite is a "Jew-lover" or "Jew-friend".

== Concept ==
The concept of philosemitism is not new, and it was arguably avowed by such thinkers as the 19th-century philosopher Friedrich Nietzsche, who described himself as an "anti-anti-Semite."

Philosemitism is an expression of the larger phenomenon of allophilia, admiration for foreign cultures as embodied in the more widely known Anglophilia and Francophilia. The rise of philosemitism has also prompted some to reconsider Jewish history and to subsequently argue that while antisemitism must be acknowledged, it is wrong to reduce the history of the Jewish people to one merely of suffering (as has been fostered by well-meaning gentile philosemites).

=== Religious philosemitism ===
Christian philosemitism, which has been associated with dispensational theology and Puritanism, promotes a positive view of the Jewish people for religious reasons (in contrast to Christian antisemitism). Christian philosemitism generally arises from a premillennial and an Israel-centered understanding of biblical prophecy, causing the belief that God still sees the Jews as his chosen people.

== Prevalence ==
=== In Europe ===
==== Germany ====
Iris Dekel writes that in twenty-first-century Germany, philosemitism "is performed in three interconnected social domains: institutional, where state institutions declare their commitment to protecting Jews as a religious minority; group, where the contingent relations between love for the Jews and exclusionary statements about them appears, mostly in casting Jews as both strange and unknown and embraced; and individual, where individuals exhibit positive sentiments toward Jews as an ideal collective".

==== Poland ====
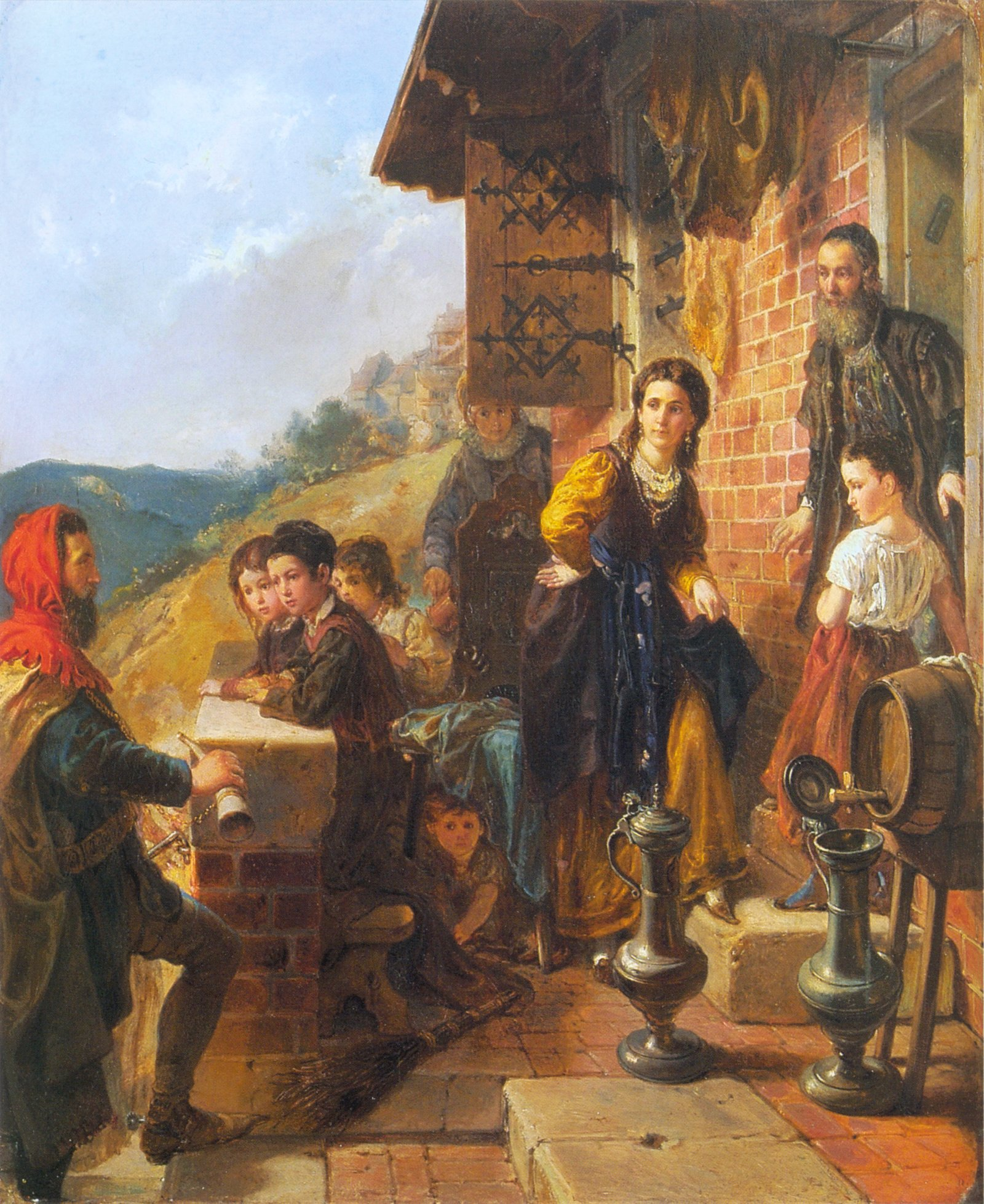
Depiction of Polish king Casimir III the Great visiting his Jewish mistress Esther, by Polish painter Władysław Łuszczkiewicz (1870)

While Jews had lived in Poland since before his reign, King Casimir III the Great allowed them to settle in Poland in great numbers and protected them as people of the king. About 70 percent of the world's European Jews, or Ashkenazi, can trace their ancestry to Poland due to Casimir's reforms. Casimir's legendary Jewish mistress Esterka remains unconfirmed by direct historical evidence, but belief in her and her legacy is widespread and prolific. South of the Old Town of Kraków King Casimir established the independent royal city of Kazimierz, which for many centuries was a place where ethnic Polish and Jewish cultures coexisted and intermingled.

==== Czechoslovakia ====
There are a variety of myths created around the supposed special relationship between Tomáš Garrigue Masaryk, the founding father of Czechoslovakia, and influential Jews from the U.S. or elsewhere. These myths, created by Masaryk and adopted in amended forms by Czechoslovak Jews, influenced cultural historian Martin Wein to cite Zygmunt Bauman's and Artur Sandauer's concept of an "allosemitic" worldview. Here, in Wein's words, "antisemitism and philosemitism overlap and share stereotypes, producing exaggerated disregard or admiration for Jews or Judaism." In this sense, Wein quotes Masaryk's statements about a decisive Jewish influence over the press, and him mentioning Jews and freemasons in the same breath, when it came to lobbies Masaryk allegedly managed to win over.

=== In the Americas ===
==== United States ====
Mark Twain's essay Concerning the Jews has been described as philosemitic. Israeli scholar Bennet Kravitz states that one could just as easily hate Jews for the reasons Twain gives for admiring them. In fact, Twain's essay was cited by Nazi sympathizers in the 1930s. Kravitz concludes, "The flawed logic of 'Concerning the Jews' and all philo-Semitism leads to the anti-Semitic beliefs that the latter seeks to deflate".

Philosemitic ideas have also been promoted by some American Evangelicals due to the influence of Dispensationalism, with some interpretations being considered antisemitic.

==== Brazil ====
A current of Jewish studies in Brazil has dedicated itself to studying the extent to which far-right politician Jair Bolsonaro's professed philo-Semitism reproduces traces of antisemitism. This perspective, based on a study of the speeches of Bolsonaro and his mentor, the writer Olavo de Carvalho, suggests that the proclaimed sympathy of far-right sectors for the State of Israel and the Jews, often presented without distinction, reverberates antisemitic tropes in two ways. Firstly, by portraying Jews as a wealthy and powerful group. In this context, Jews are often depicted as pillars of capitalism and, therefore, inherently hostile to the left. The second and most significant expression of antisemitism in the far right's sympathy for Judaism would be inspired by authors such as Rabbi Marvin Stuart Antelman, and reaffirms conspiracy theories presenting left-wing Jews as a group seeking world domination, but which would ultimately undermine the Jewish nation itself. In this context, researchers demonstrate how the philo-Semitism of the Brazilian far right has been employed to divide the Jewish community. The designation of true Jews is thus reserved for those who espouse conservative or reactionary policies, while left-wing Jews are regarded as apostates or traitors.

=== In Asia ===
Very few Jews live in East Asian countries, but Jews are viewed in an especially positive light in some of them, partly owing to their shared wartime experiences during the Second World War. Examples include South Korea, Japan, and China.

==== China ====
According to Mary J. Ainslie, philosemitism in China is "part of a civilizationist narrative designed to position China as globally central and superior".

==== South Korea ====
In general, Jews are stereotyped with characteristics that in South Korean culture are considered positive: intelligence, business-savviness and commitment to family values and responsibility, while in the Western world, the first of the two aforementioned stereotypes more often have the negatively interpreted equivalents of guile and greed. The South Korean ambassador to Israel, Ma Young-sam said that, in South Korean primary schools, the Talmud should be mandatory reading. Oscar nominee Youn Yuh-jung said that she hopes Koreans will one day dominate the entertainment and culture industries, just as the Jews had occupied them.

== See also ==
- Philosephardism
- Christian Zionism
- Conversion to Judaism
- Ger toshav
- God-fearers
- Judeo-Christian
- La belle juive
- Messianic Judaism
- Model minority
- Opposition to antisemitism
- Racial fetishism
- Sacred Name Movement

== Sources ==
- Alan Edelstein. An Unacknowledged Harmony: Philo-Semitism and the Survival of European Jewry. (Contributions in Ethnic Studies). ISBN 0-313-22754-3
- David S. Katz. Philo-Semitism and the Readmission of the Jews to England, 1603–1655. ISBN 0-19-821885-0
- Hilary L. Rubinstein & William D. Rubinstein. Philosemitism: Admiration and Support in the English-Speaking World for Jews, 1840–1939. (Studies in Modern History). ISBN 0-312-22205-X
- Frank Stern. The Whitewashing of the Yellow Badge: Antisemitism and Philosemitism in Postwar Germany. (Studies in Antisemitism) ISBN 0-08-040653-X
- Marion Mushkat. Philo-Semitic and Anti-Jewish Attitudes in Post-Holocaust Poland. (Symposium Series, Vol 33). ISBN 0-7734-9176-7
- Frank Stern. Im Anfang war Auschwitz : Antisemitismus und Philosemitismus im deutschen Nachkrieg. ISBN 3-88350-459-9
- Gertrude Himmelfarb. The People of the Book: Philosemitism in England, From Cromwell to Churchill. ISBN 1-59403-570-9
