= Zebulon Baird =

American politician (1764–1824)

North Carolina State Senator

Personal details
- Born: August 3, 1764 Scotland or New Jersey
- Died: March 10, 1824 (aged 59) Near Asheville, North Carolina
- Spouse: Hannah Lay Erwin
- Children: Mira Margaret Baird Vance, Anna Baird Smith
- Relatives: Zebulon Vance (grandson); Robert B. Vance (grandson)
- Occupation: politician

Zebulon Baird (1764–1824) was an American merchant and politician who served in the North Carolina Senate.

== Biography ==
Baird was born in either Scotland or colonial New Jersey in 1764. Baird became a wealthy slave owner and farmer in Buncombe County, North Carolina. He was in North Carolina by 1793 when "Zebulon and Bedent Baird bought land from [John] Burton, and established a store, to which they brought goods carted by wagon across rough mountain roads." The store was located near what is now "Pack Square in downtown Asheville. They often made trips to towns along the North Carolina coast, carrying with them furs, meat, flour, molasses, and other goods, and trading for merchandise which they could then sell in their general store." Baird operated a ferry crossing service on the French Broad River and owned a merchant store in Asheville. He was a Presbyterian by religion.

He was elected to the North Carolina House of Commons in 1801 and 1803. He served as a member of the North Carolina Senate, representing Buncombe County, elected first in 1809, also in 1818, 1820, and 1822. One of his major legislative pushes was funding for the construction of what is now called the Old Buncombe Road through the Saluda Gap.

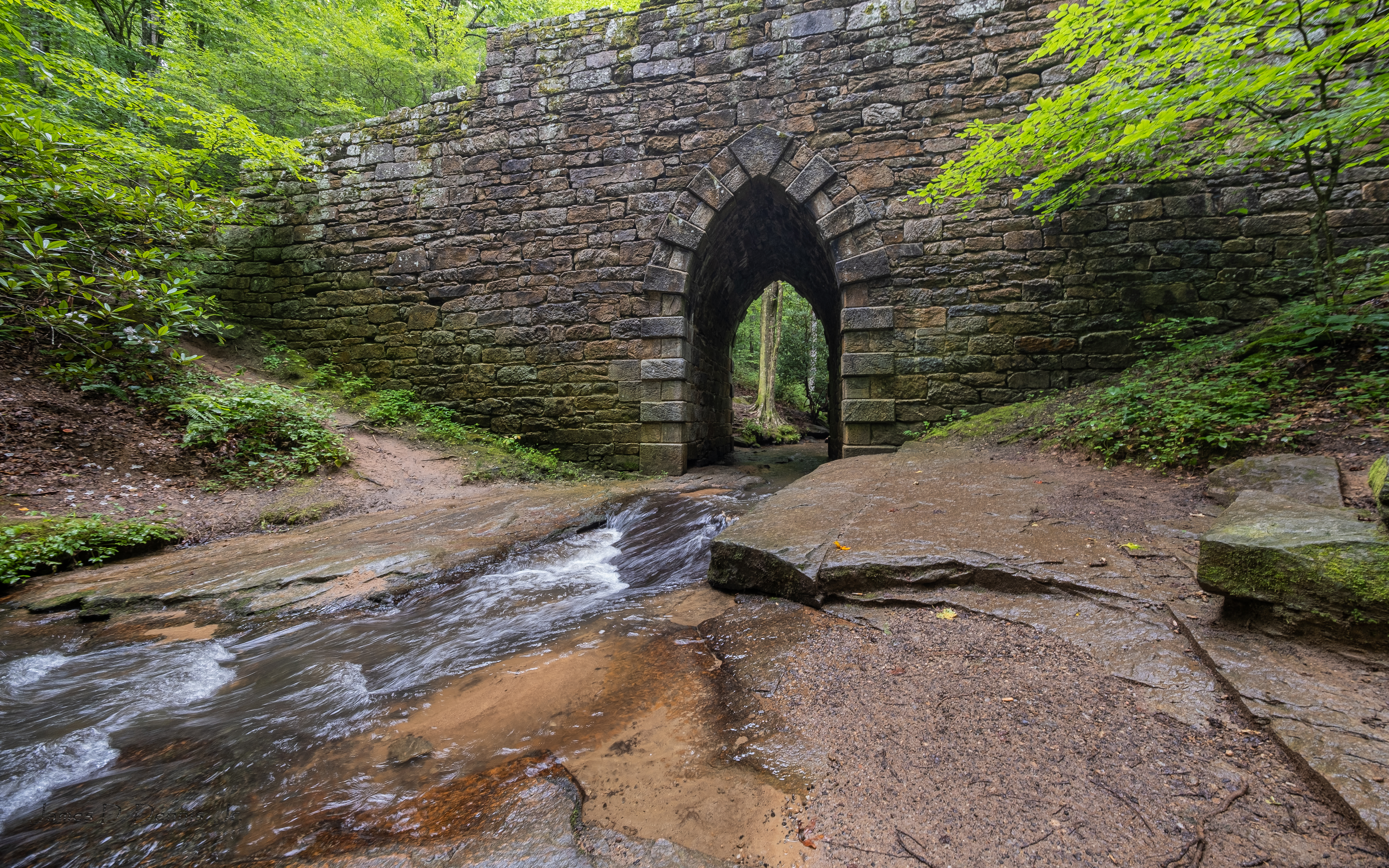
Poinsett Bridge, built 1820 on the Old Buncombe Road

He served in the North Carolina militia at the rank of major, and is thus sometimes referred to as Maj. Baird.

Baird died "suddenly, of an apoplectic fit" at age 58 near Asheville, North Carolina. He is believed to be buried in Asheville's Riverside Cemetery.

Baird was married to Hannah Lay Erwin. Their daughter, Mira Margaret Baird, married the wealthy landowner David Vance Jr., who was the son of David Vance. He had another daughter, Anna Baird, who married the wealthy merchant Bacchus J. Smith from Burnsville.

Baird was the grandfather of the politicians Zebulon Vance and Robert B. Vance. One of his grandsons built Buncombe County's Zebulon H. Baird House, which is listed on the National Register of Historic Places.

== See also ==
- Robert Brank Vance

== See also ==
- Andrew Erwin (businessman)
