= Zebulon H. Baird House =

Historic house in North Carolina, United States

- U.S. National Register of Historic Places
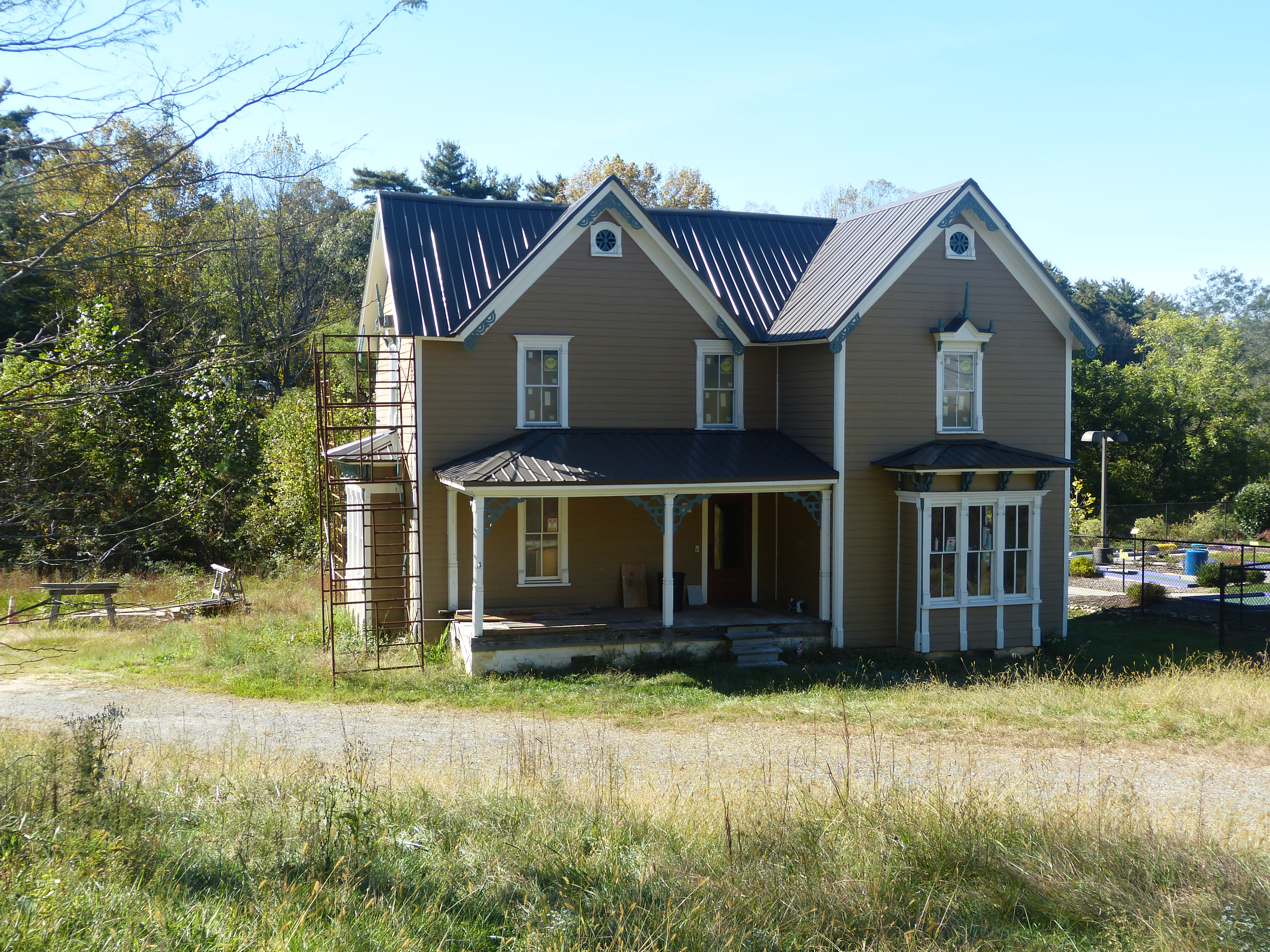

- Location within North Carolina Location within the United States
- Location: 446 Weaverville Rd., near Weaverville, North Carolina
- Coordinates: 35.66858°N 82.58465°W
- Area: 0.8 acres (0.32 ha)
- Built: c. 1865
- Architectural style: Late Victorian
- NRHP reference No.: 09000261
- Added to NRHP: April 30, 2009

Zebulon H. Baird House is a historic home located near Weaverville, Buncombe County, North Carolina. It was built around 1865, and is a two-story, "T"-plan Late Victorian style frame dwelling. It features intricate detailing in its scrollwork and ornate chimneys with elaborate corbelling. In 2005, it was moved 100 yards to the south from its original location.

It was listed on the National Register of Historic Places in 2009.

== See also ==
- Zebulon Baird
- Mira Margaret Baird Vance
- Zebulon Vance
- Robert B. Vance
