= List of United States political families (V) =

The following is an alphabetical list of political families in the United States whose last name begins with V.

== The Vails ==
- George Vail (1809–1875), New Jersey Assemblyman 1843–1844, candidate for U.S. Representative from New Jersey 1850, U.S. Representative from New Jersey 1853–1857, U.S. Consul in Glasgow, Scotland 1858–1861; Judge of the New Jersey Court of Appeals 1865–1871. First cousin of Theodore Newton Vail.
  - Theodore Newton Vail (1845–1920), delegate to the Republican National Convention 1916. First cousin of George Vail.

== The Vallones ==
- Charles J. Vallone (1901–1967), Queens County Civil Court Judge 1955–1967, Father of Peter Vallone Sr.
- Leah Palmigiano Vallone, Democratic State Committeewoman, mother of Peter Vallone Sr, wife of Charles J Vallone.
  - Peter Vallone Sr. (born 1934), New York City Councilman 1974–2001, Speaker of the City Council 1986–2001, Candidate for New York State Governor 1998, Candidate for New York City Mayor 2001. Son of Charles J Vallone and Leah Vallone.
    - Peter Vallone Jr. (born 1961) New York City Councilman 2002–2013, Assistant to the Manhattan District Attorney 1996–2001, Candidate for Queens Borough President 2013, son of Peter Vallone, Sr, brother of Paul and Perry Vallone.
    - Paul Vallone (1967–2024), New York City Councilman 2014–2021, New York City Council Candidate in Democratic Primary 2009. Son of Peter Vallone, Sr, brother of Peter Vallone Jr.

== The Van Alens and Van Burens ==
- Abraham Van Buren (1737–1817), father of Martin Van Buren, Clerk of Kinderhook, New York (1787–1797)
  - James I. Van Alen (1776–1870), Clerk of Kinderhook, New York (1797–1801, delegate to the New York Constitutional Convention (1801, 1803), Justice of the Peace (1801–1804), New York Assemblyman (1804), U.S. Representative from New York (1807–1809). Half-brother of Martin Van Buren.
  - Martin Van Buren (1782–1862), Surrogate of Columbia County (1808–1813), New York State Senator (1813–1820), Attorney General of New York (1816–1819), delegate to the New York Constitutional Convention (1821), U.S. Senator from New York (1821–1828), Governor of New York (1829), U.S. Secretary of State (1829–1831), U.S. Minister to Great Britain (1831–1832), Vice President of the United States (1833–1837), President of the United States (1837–1841), candidate for President of the United States (1848). Brother of James I. Van Alen.
    - John Van Buren (1810–1866), Attorney General of New York 1845–1847, candidate for Attorney General of New York 1865. Son of Martin Van Buren.
  - Lawrence Van Buren (1786–1868), brother of Martin Van Buren, Kinderhook Town Supervisor (1837–1840, 1845–1846, 1850–1851), Kinderhook postmaster, and Democratic presidential elector in 1852.
  - Abraham Van Buren (1788–1836), brother of Martin Van Buren, served as Surrogate of Columbia County after James I. Van Alen and Martin Van Buren.

NOTE: Martin Van Buren's wife Hannah was also sister-in-law of New York State Senator Moses I. Cantine and great-uncle by marriage of Green Bay, Wisconsin Mayor Arthur C. Neville. Van Buren's son, Smith Thompson Van Buren, married Henrietta Irving, niece of U.S. Minister Washington Irving.

== The Vander Woudes and Den Hartogs ==
- John Vander Woude, Member of the Idaho House of Representatives 2006–2008 and since 2010
  - Lori Den Hartog, Member of the Idaho Senate since 2014. Daughter of John Vander Woude.

== The Van Dykes ==
- Nicholas Van Dyke (1738–1789), delegate to the Delaware Constitutional Convention 1776, Delaware Councilman, Judge of Admiralty in Delaware, Delegate to the Continental Congress from Delaware 1777–1781, President of Delaware 1783–1786. Father of Nicholas Van Dyke.
  - Nicholas Van Dyke (1770–1826), Delaware State Representative 1799, Attorney General of Delaware 1801–1806, U.S. Representative from Delaware 1807–1811, Delaware State Senator 1815–1816, U.S. Senator from Delaware 1817–1826. Son of Nicholas Van Dyke.

== The Van Hollens ==
- Christopher Van Hollen (1922–2013), U.S. Ambassador to Sri Lanka 1972–1976, U.S. Ambassador to the Maldive Islands 1972–1976. Father of Christopher Van Hollen Jr.
  - Christopher Van Hollen Jr. (born 1959), Maryland State Representative 1990–1994, Maryland State Senator 1994–2002, U.S. Representative from Maryland 2003–2017, U.S. Senator from Maryland since 2017, delegate to the Democratic National Convention 2004. Son of Christopher Van Hollen.

== The Van Leers ==
- Samuel Van Leer (1747–1825) iron works owner and captain in the American Revolutionary War. His furnace supplied cannon and cannonballs for the Revolutionary Army.
  - George Howard Earle III (1890–1974), great-grandson of Samuel Van Leer, former Pennsylvania Governor and diplomat.
    - Blake R. Van Leer (1893–1956), was an orphan who became the fifth president of Georgia Institute of Technology, founder of Southern Polytechnic State University, former dean of University of Florida and United States Army Officer. Van Leer was caught in a political battle with Georgia governor Marvin Griffin.
  - Antoinette Van Leer Polk (1847–1919), American Southern belle, Southern heroine and Baroness de Charette
  - VanLeer Polk (a.k.a. Van Leer Polk) (1858–1907), an American politician and diplomat from Tennessee. His grandfather was Anthony Wayne Van Leer.

== The Van Nesses and McCoppins ==
- Peter Van Ness (1734–1804), New York State Assembly (1782, 1784), New York State Senate (1787–1797), New York State Council of Appointment (1789), First Judge and Judge of Columbia County. Father of John P., William P., and Cornelius P. Van Ness.
  - John Peter Van Ness (1769–1846), Member of the United States House of Representatives from New York (1801–1803), alderman of Washington, DC (1829–1830), Mayor of Washington, DC (1830–1834).
  - William P. Van Ness (1778–1826), Judge of the United States District Court for the District of New York (1812–1826).
  - Cornelius P. Van Ness (1782–1852), U.S. Attorney for Vermont (1810–1813), Member of the Vermont House of Representatives (1818), Chief Justice of the Vermont Supreme Court (1821–1823), Governor of Vermont (1823–1826), U.S. Minister to Spain (1829–1836), Collector of the Port of New York (1844–1845). Father of Cornelius Van Ness, James Van Ness, and George Van Ness.
    - Cornelius Van Ness (1803–1842), Secretary of the U.S. legation in Spain during his father's ambassadorship. District Attorney of the Republic of Texas' Fourth Judicial District (1837–1839). Member of the Congress of the Republic of Texas (1838–1842).
    - James Van Ness (1808–1872), Mayor of San Francisco (1855–1856); California State Senator (1871). Son of Cornelius P. Van Ness.
      - Frank McCoppin (1834–1897), Mayor of San Francisco, California (1867–1869). Son-in-law of James Van Ness.
    - George Van Ness (1817–1855), Commissioner for the Texan Santa Fe Expedition, Collector of Customs at Carrizo Springs, Texas, Postmaster of Fort Duncan, Texas.

== The van Rensselaers ==
The van Rensselaers are a wealthy and politically active family centered around Albany, New York.

- Jeremiah van Rensselaer (1738–1810), a U.S. Representative during the first United States Congress.
  - Solomon van Rensselaer (1774–1852), a U.S. Representative, and lieutenant colonel during the War of 1812, son of Jeremiah.
- Killian van Rensselaer (1763–1845), a U.S. Representative, first cousin of Jeremiah
  - Stephen van Rensselaer III (1764–1839), a U.S. Representative, a general during the War of 1812, and founder of the Rensselaer Polytechnic Institute, first cousin of Solomon.
  - Philip S. van Rensselaer (1767–1824), Mayor of Albany, New York, 1799–1814 and 1819–1821. Brother of Stephen van Rensselaer III.
    - Henry van Rensselaer (1810–1864), a U.S. Representative, and a Union Army general during the American Civil War, son of Stephen.

NOTE: Stephen van Rensselaer III was also son-in-law of U.S. Senator William Paterson and U.S. Senator Philip Schuyler. He and Philip S. van Renssealer were also half-brothers of U.S. Representative Rensselaer Westerlo and brother-in-law of New York Attorney General John Woodworth.

== The Van Winkles ==
- Peter G. Van Winkle (1808–1872), delegate to the Virginia Constitutional Convention 1850, delegate to the West Virginia Constitutional Convention 1863, West Virginia House Delegate 1863, U.S. Senator from West Virginia 1863–1869. Granduncle of Marshal Van Winkle.
  - Marshall Van Winkle (1869–1957), candidate for U.S. Representative from New Jersey 1900, U.S. Representative from New Jersey 1905–1907. Grandnephew of Peter G. Van Winkle.

== The Vances ==
- David Vance (c.1745–1813), Member of the North Carolina House of Commons (1786–1791)
  - Robert Brank Vance (1793–1827), U.S. Representative from North Carolina 1823–1825, candidate for U.S. Representative from North Carolina 1826. Uncle of Robert B. Vance and Zebulon Baird Vance.
  - Mira Margaret Baird Vance (1802 – 1878), farmer. Daughter-in-law of David Vance.
    - Robert B. Vance (1828–1899), U.S. Representative from North Carolina 1873–1885, North Carolina State Representative 1894–1896. Son of Mira Margaret Baird Vance. Nephew of Robert Brank Vance.
    - Zebulon Baird Vance (1830–1894), Prosecuting Attorney of Buncombe County, North Carolina 1852; member of the North Carolina House of Commons 1854; candidate for North Carolina State Senate 1856; candidate for U.S. Representative from North Carolina 1856; U.S. Representative from North Carolina 1858–1861; Governor of North Carolina 1862–1865 and 1877–1879; candidate for U.S. Senate from North Carolina 1872; U.S. Senator from North Carolina 1879–1894. Son of Mira Margaret Baird Vance. Nephew of Robert Brank Vance.
    - Harriett Newell Espy Vance (1832–1878), First Lady of North Carolina 1862–1865 and 1877–1878. First wife of Zebulon Baird Vance.
    - Florence Steele Martin Vance (1840–1924), heiress. Second wife of Zebulon Baird Vance.

== The Vances of Alabama ==
- Robert Smith Vance, (1931–1989), Judge of the United States Court of Appeals for the Fifth Circuit 1977–1981, Judge of the United States Court of Appeals for the Eleventh Circuit 1981–1989.
  - Bob Vance (born 1961), Circuit Judge of Jefferson County, Alabama, since 2002. Son of Robert Smith Vance.

== The Vares ==
- George H. Vare (1859–1908), Pennsylvania State Senator 1897–1908. Brother of Edwin H. Vare and William Scott Vare.
- Edwin H. Vare (1862–1922), Pennsylvania State Senator 1909–1922. Brother of George H. Vare and William Scott Vare.
- William Scott Vare (1867–1934), Philadelphia, Pennsylvania Councilman 1898–1901; Philadelphia, Pennsylvania Recorder of Deeds 1902–1912; delegate to the Republican National Convention 1908 1912 1916 1920 1924 1928; candidate for Mayor of Philadelphia, Pennsylvania 1911; Pennsylvania State Senator 1912 and 1922–1923; U.S. Representative from Pennsylvania 1912–1923 and 1923–1927; U.S. Senator from Pennsylvania 1927–1929. Brother of George H. Vare and Edwin H. Vare.

== The Varnums ==
- James Mitchell Varnum (1748–1789), Delegate to the Continental Congress from Rhode Island 1780–1781 and 1787. Brother of Joseph Bradley Varnum.
- Joseph Bradley Varnum (1751–1821), U.S. Representative from Massachusetts 1795–1811, Speaker of the U.S. House of Representatives 1807–1809 and 1809–1811, U.S. Senator from Massachusetts 1811–1817. Brother of James Mitchell Varnum.

== The Vauxs ==
- Roberts Vaux (1786–1836), Judge of the Philadelphia, Pennsylvania Court of Common Pleas. Father of Richard Vaux.
  - Richard Vaux (1816–1895), Pennsylvania State Representative 1839, delegate to the Pennsylvania Democratic Convention 1840, candidate for Mayor of Philadelphia, Pennsylvania 1842, 1845, and 1854; Mayor of Philadelphia, Pennsylvania 1856–1858; member of the Philadelphia, Pennsylvania Board of Trusts 1859–1866; U.S. Representative from Pennsylvania 1890–1891. Son of Roberts Vaux.

== The Venables ==
- Abraham B. Venable (1758–1811), U.S. Representative from Virginia 1791–1799, U.S. Senator from Virginia 1803–1804. Uncle of Abraham Watkins Venable.
  - Abraham Watkins Venable (1799–1876), U.S. Representative from North Carolina 1847–1853, Confederate States Provisional Representative from North Carolina 1861, Confederate States Representative from North Carolina 1962–1864. Nephew of Abraham B. Venable.

== The Venemans ==
- John Veneman (1925–1982), California Assemblyman, candidate for Lieutenant Governor of California 1974. Father of Ann Veneman.
  - Ann Veneman (born 1949), U.S. Secretary of Agriculture 2001–2005. Daughter of John Veneman.

== The Verplancks ==
- William Samuel Johnson (1727–1819), U.S. Senator from Connecticut 1789–1791. Father-in-law of Daniel C. Verplanck.
  - Daniel C. Verplanck (1762–1834), U.S. Representative from New York 1803–1809, Judge of Dutchess County, New York Court of Common Pleas 1828–1830. Father of Gulian Crommelin Verplanck.
    - Gulian Crommelin Verplanck (1786–1870), New York Assemblyman 1820–1823, U.S. Representative from New York 1825–1833, candidate for Mayor of New York City 1834, New York State Senator 1838–1841, delegate to the New York Constitutional Convention 1867 1868. Son of Daniel C. Verplanck.

== The Vilases ==
- Levi Baker Vilas (1811–1879), Wisconsin Assemblyman 1855 1868 1873, Mayor of Madison, Wisconsin 1861–1862. Father of William Freeman Vilas.
  - William Freeman Vilas (1840–1908), Postmaster General of the United States 1885–1888, U.S. Secretary of the Interior 1888–1889, U.S. Senator from Wisconsin 1891–1897. Son of Levi Baker Vilas.
- Joseph Vilas (1832–1905), Wisconsin State Senator 1863–1864; Mayor of Manitowoc, Wisconsin. Cousin of William Freeman.

== The Vinings ==
- John Vining, Delaware Colony Assemblyman, Chief Justice of the Delaware Colony Supreme Court. Father of John M. Vining.
  - John M. Vining (1758–1802), Delegate to the Continental Congress from Delaware 1784–1786, Delaware Assemblyman 1787–1789, U.S. Representative from Delaware 1789–1793, U.S. Senator from Delaware 1793–1798. Son of John Vining.

== The Vinsons ==
- Colonel William Vinson (c. 1819 – 1883), member of the Virginia House of Delegates 1853–1854. Brother of Samuel Sperry Vinson.
  - Richard F. Vinson (1838–1910), Lawrence County Judge in Kentucky, County Clerk 1858–1872, Clerk of the Circuit Court 1858–1872. Son of William Vinson.
    - Arnoldus J. Garred (1856–1926), Master Commissioner and Receiver for Lawrence County, Kentucky, Circuit Court Clerk, Deputy County Clerk. Son-in-law of Richard F. Vinson.
  - Z. C. Vinson (1846–1918), Kentucky State Representative 1883–1885. Son of William Vinson.
    - John B. Vinson (born 1866), Boyd County Attorney in Kentucky, Catlettsburg City Attorney. Son of Z. C. Vinson.
- Samuel Sperry Vinson (1833–1904), Presidential Elector for West Virginia 1892, appointed U.S. Marshal of West Virginia by President Grover Cleveland. Brother of William Vinson.
  - Mary Vinson Clark (1878–1957), Delegate to Democratic National Convention from West Virginia 1948, 1952; Presidential Elector for West Virginia 1948. Daughter of Samuel Sperry Vinson.
  - James A. Hughes (1861–1930), U.S. Representative from West Virginia 1900–1914 and 1926–1930, West Virginia State Senator 1894–1898, Kentucky State Representative 1888–1890, Delegate to every Republican National Convention 1892–1924. Son-in-law of Samuel Sperry Vinson.
    - Frederick Moore Vinson (1890–1953), Chief Justice of the United States 1946–1953, United States Secretary of the Treasury 1945–1946, U.S. Representative from Kentucky 1924–1929 and 1931–1938. Grandnephew of William Vinson and Samuel Sperry Vinson.
    - Roberta Dixon Vinson (1898–1983), Delegate to Democratic National Convention from Kentucky 1944. Wife of Frederick Moore Vinson.

== The Voorheeses ==
- Daniel W. Voorhees (1827–1897), candidate for U.S. Representative from Indiana 1856, U.S. District Attorney of Indiana 1858–1861, U.S. Representative from Indiana 1861–1866 and 1869–1873, U.S. Senator from Indiana 1877–1897. Father of Charles S. Voorhees.
  - Charles S. Voorhees (1853–1909), Prosecuting Attorney of Whitman County, Washington 1882–1885; U.S. Congressional Delegate from Washington Territory 1885–1889. Son of Daniel W. Voorhees.
