= Vinson =

Vinson may refer to:

== Places ==
- Vinson, Oklahoma, a community in the US
- Vinson Massif, the highest mountain in Antarctica

== People ==
=== Surname ===
- Vinson (surname), people with the surname Vinson
  - Vinson political family

=== Forename ===
- Vinson "Vince" Champ (born 1961), American serial rapist and former comedian
- Vinson Chiu (born 1998), American tennis player
- Vinson Cole (born 1950), American tenor
- Vinson Filyaw (1969–2021), American sex offender and kidnapper
- Vinson Knight (1804–1842), American religious leader of the Latter Day Saint movement
- Vinson Smith (born 1965), American football player

== Other uses ==
- VINSON, a family of voice encryption devices
- Vinson, a fictional member of the Stanfield Organization, on The Wire
- USS Carl Vinson (CVN-70), a US Navy Nimitz-class supercarrier
- Vinson & Elkins, an American law firm

== See also ==
- Vincent (disambiguation)
- Vinzons (disambiguation)
