= Venus Vance =

American slave

Venus Vance (died circa 1850) was an American slave. She was enslaved on the Vance plantation by David Vance and Mira Margaret Baird Vance, the parents of North Carolina Governor Zebulon Vance and U.S. Congressman Robert B. Vance, whom she was charged with raising.

== Biography ==
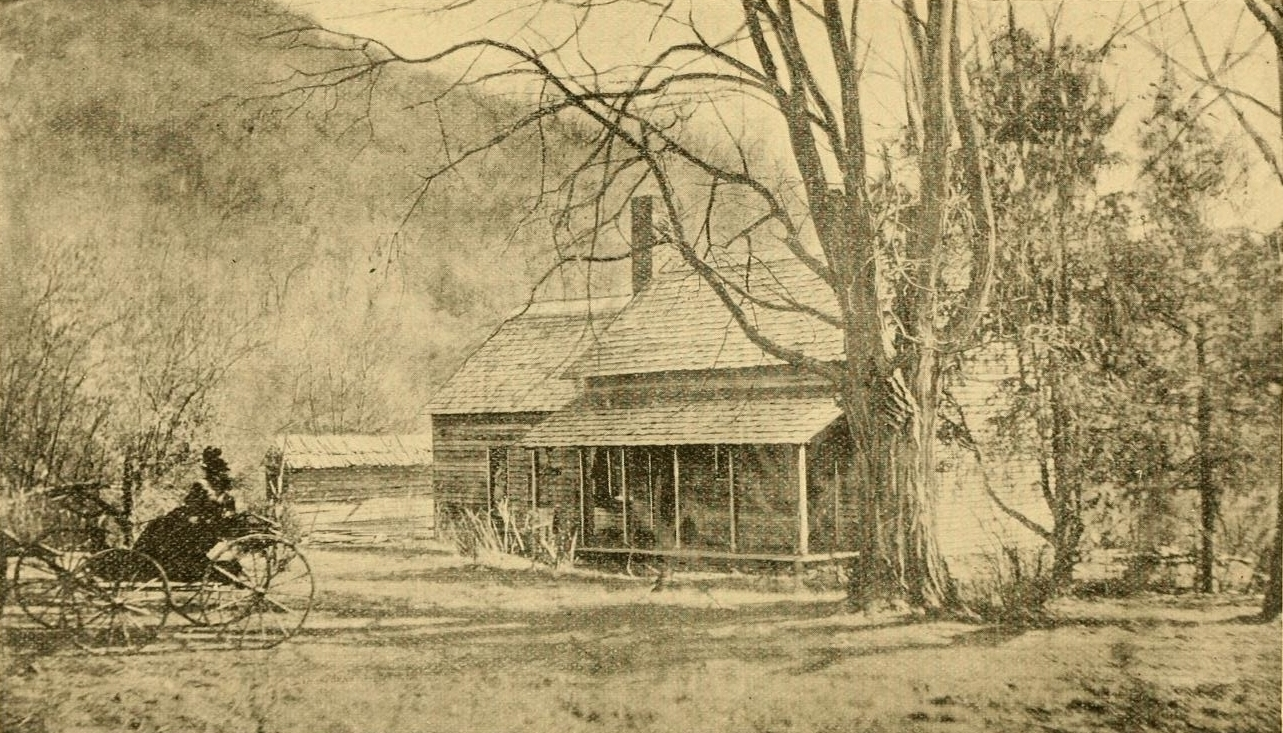
The home where Venus was enslaved

Vance was a house slave owned by Mira Margaret Baird and David Vance Jr., a farmer, innkeeper, and the son of Colonel David Vance Sr. She cared for their eight children, including future North Carolina Governor Zebulon Vance and future U.S. Congressman Robert B. Vance, at the family's home in Buncombe County, North Carolina. She was referred to by the Vance family as "Mammy Venus."

Following David Vance Jr.'s death in January 1844, Venus and eleven other slaves were auctioned off during an estate sale. She was purchased back by Mira Vance for one dollar.

Since she does not appear in Mira Vance's 1850 slave schedule, it is presumed that she died between 1844 and 1850.
