= Vinson (surname) =

Vinson is an English and French surname derived as a patronymic of Vincent.

Notable people with the name include:

- Auguste Vinson, French physician
- Carl Vinson (1883–1981), American politician
- Carson Vinson (born 2001), American football player
- Carol Vinson, Australian footballer
- Charlie Vinson (born 1944), American baseball player
- Clarence Vinson, American boxer
- Corey Vinson, American basketball coach and player
- Danny Vinson (born 1954), American character actor
- Eddie Vinson (1917–1988), American saxophonist and blues shouter
- Fernandus Vinson (born 1968), American football player
- Fred M. Vinson, Chief Justice of the United States
- Fred Vinson (American football) (born 1977), American football player
- Fred Vinson (basketball), American basketball player
- Gary Vinson (1936–1984), American actor
- Helen Vinson (1907–1999), American actress
- Jason Vinson, American football player
- Julien Vinson (1843-1926), French linguist
- Maribel Vinson (1911–1961), American figure skater
- Marjorie Vinson (1905–2000), British-born Falkland Islander teacher
- Michael Vinson (born 1999), American football player
- Mose Vinson (1917–2002), American boogie-woogie, blues and jazz pianist and singer
- Nigel Vinson, Baron Vinson (born 1931), British entrepreneur and politician
- Pauline Vinson, American illustrator
- Roger Vinson (1940–2023), American judge
- Rube Vinson (1879–1951), American baseball player
- Sharni Vinson (born 1983), Australian-American actress, dancer
- Sigolène Vinson, French novelist, Charlie Hebdo journalist
- Tony Vinson (1935–2017), Australian social scientist
- Tony Vinson (American football) (born 1971), German gridiron football player
- Walter Vinson (1901–1975), American Memphis blues guitarist, singer and songwriter

== See also ==
- Vinson (disambiguation)
- Vinson political family (USA)
