= Hillside, North Carolina =

Freedmen's town in North Carolina, US

Hillside
- Historic African-American freedmen community
- Interactive map of Hillside
- Coordinates: 35°41′28″N 82°33′32″W
- Country: United States
- State: North Carolina
- County: Buncombe
- Town: Weaverville
- School site acquired: 1898

Hillside is a historic African-American Affrilachian freedmen freedom colony in Weaverville, Buncombe County, North Carolina, United States. It was centered on Hillside Street in the southern part of the town. The community's anchoring institutions are Little Mount Zion Baptist Church and the Historic Weaverville Colored School, a two-room segregated schoolhouse completed in 1926 that later served for decades as the Hillside Community Center and is now the focus of a community-led preservation campaign.

== History ==
=== School origins (1898–1926) ===
In 1898, the Reems Creek Township school committee acquired property between Reems Creek Road and Hillside Street for a public school serving the area's African-American children. A one-room school for Black students operated on the site from about 1900.

In 1925, the Buncombe County Board of Education authorized construction of a new building: the timeline records the county's application for a state school loan, the hiring of the architect Thomas Edwin Davis to prepare plans, and the award of a construction contract to W. V. Henry. The resulting two-room Weaverville Colored School opened in about 1926 and served the community's children under segregated schooling for the following quarter century.

=== Closure and conversion (1949–1960s) ===
In 1949, a Buncombe County grand jury committee condemned the Weaverville Colored School, along with two other county schools, over its poor physical condition, citing broken toilet facilities and worn, insufficient desks, tables, blackboards, and library equipment. In 1952, parents and community members petitioned the Board of Education to keep the school open, but the petition was unsuccessful; the school closed in 1952 or 1953; its students were reassigned to Shiloh Elementary School in South Asheville, roughly a dozen miles away.

The Town of Weaverville subsequently leased the vacant building from Buncombe County and converted it into the Hillside Community Center for the town's African-American community; the community timeline dates the conversion project to 1956, while the Preservation Society dates the town's lease and conversion to 1965.

=== Relocation (1962–1963) ===
In the early 1960s, plans to expand and relocate Reems Creek Road through the school site threatened the building with demolition. Instead, the Town of Weaverville purchased a nearby lot on Hillside Street in January 1963, and the building was moved approximately 200 feet (60 m) up Hillside Street to its present location, where it continued to operate as the community center.

=== Church ownership (2004–present) ===
The Hillside Community Center closed in the 1990s amid municipal budget cuts. In 2003 the Weaverville Town Council approved the sale of the building to Little Mount Zion Baptist Church, the neighborhood's historic congregation on Hillside Street, for $10,000; the sale closed on January 13, 2004. The church has since used the building as a fellowship hall and as a community center for both the congregation and the wider community.

== Preservation ==
Community members and Weaverville residents, organized as Save Hillside, are working with the Preservation Society of Asheville and Buncombe County (PSABC) to restore and rehabilitate the deteriorating schoolhouse. PSABC accepted the donation of a preservation easement on the school in 2023 and is assisting with fundraising for its restoration. A PSABC grant has also funded the creation of two interpretive history panels for installation inside the building — one on the history of the Hillside community and one on the education of Black residents of the area during segregation. A draft National Register of Historic Places nomination for the school was prepared in 1989; the building's listing status remains unresolved.

The building is among the few surviving structures in western North Carolina associated with the segregated schooling of the region's Black Appalachian communities, and the site continues to serve civic functions: the Hillside Community Center at 35 Hillside Street was used as a community supply-distribution point during the 2024 Hurricane Helene emergency response.

== See also ==
- Rosenwald School
- School segregation in the United States
