= Mira Margaret Baird Vance =

American slave owner and farmer

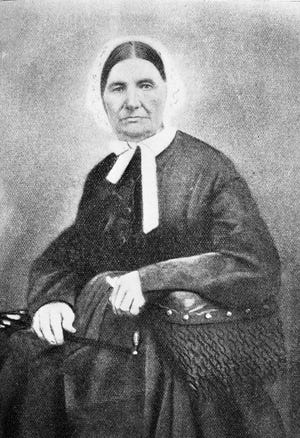
- Born: Elmira Margaret Baird; December 22, 1802; Buncombe County, North Carolina, U.S.
- Died: October 1878 (aged 75)
- Resting place: Riverside Cemetery
- Occupation: farmer
- Spouse: David Vance II
- Children: 8 (including Zebulon and Robert)
- Parent(s): Zebulon Baird; Hannah Lay Erwin

Elmira Margaret Baird Vance (1802 – 1878) was an American socialite, farmer, and slave owner. She was the mother of North Carolina Governor Zebulon Vance and U.S. Congressman Robert B. Vance.

== Biography ==
Vance was born Mira Margaret Baird on December 22, 1802, in Buncombe County, North Carolina. She was the daughter of Hannah Lay Erwin Baird and Zebulon Baird, a member of the North Carolina Senate.

She married Daniel Vance II, a farmer and innkeeper who was the son of Colonel David Vance. They had eight children, including Zebulon Vance and Robert B. Vance. She was a society lady and also managed her family's plantation near Reems Creek.

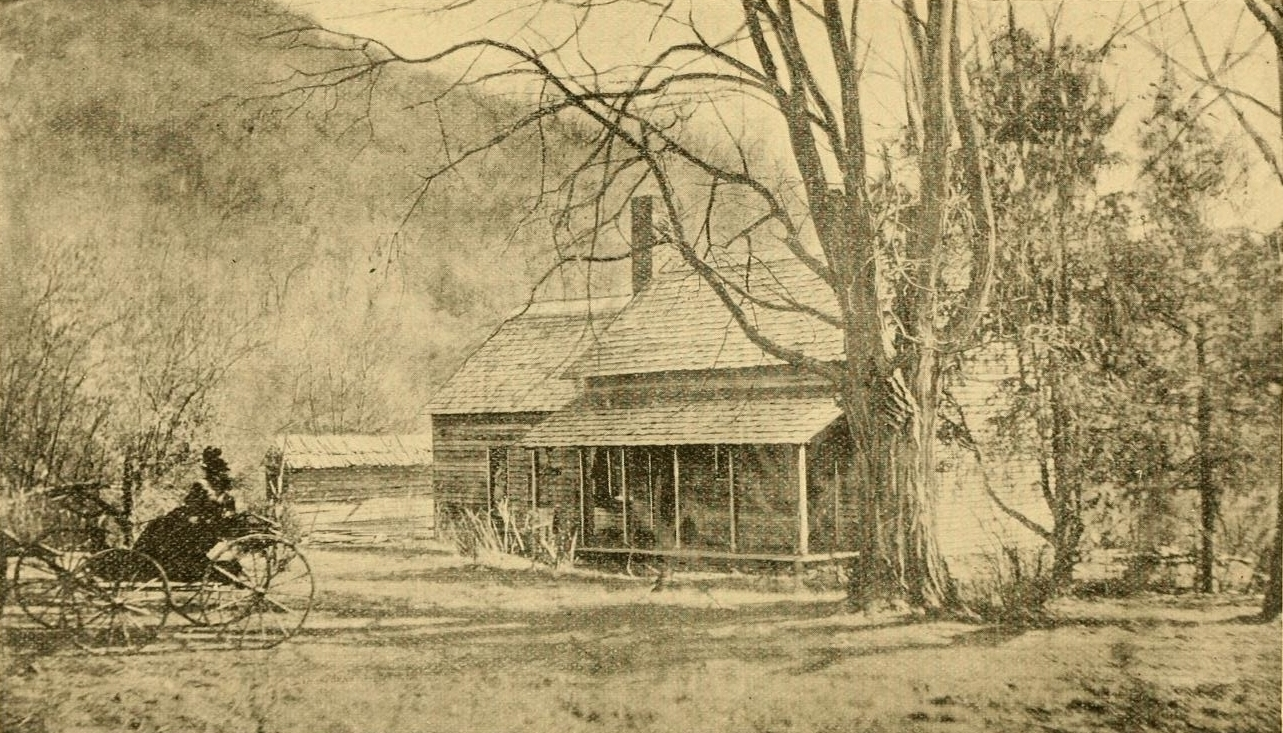
Vance's home near Reems Creek

She was widowed at the age of forty-two and had to auction off some of her husband's property, including eleven slaves. She bought back one slave, Venus, for one dollar. She moved the family, and seven enslaved women and children, to Asheville.

Vance was a member of the Presbyterian church. She was fond of reading, particularly the Bible, as noted in Clement Dowd's 1897 biography Life of Zebulon Vance.

She died in 1878 and was buried in Riverside Cemetery.
