= Brigman-Chambers House =

Historic house in North Carolina, United States

- U.S. National Register of Historic Places
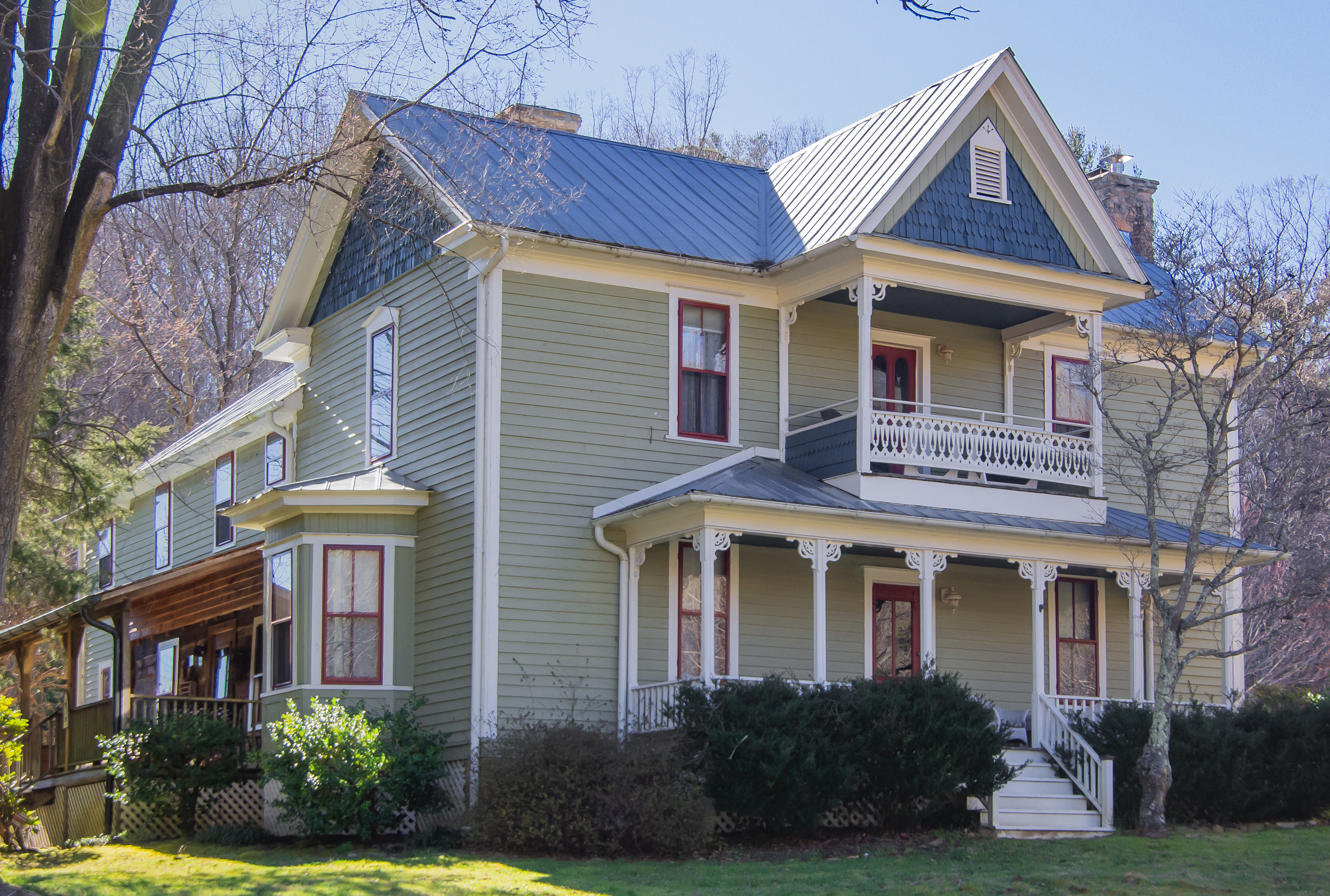

- Location within North Carolina Location within the United States
- Location: NC 1003, 0.6. mi. W of jct. with NC 2118, Weaverville, North Carolina
- Coordinates: 35°42′22″N 82°29′27″W
- Area: less than one acre
- Built: c. 1845, c. 1880
- Built by: Morris, Fabe
- Architectural style: I-house
- NRHP reference No.: 04000573
- Added to NRHP: June 2, 2004

Brigman-Chambers House is a historic house located at Weaverville, Buncombe County, North Carolina.

== Description and history ==
The earliest log section was built about 1845, and forms the rear ell. It was raised to a full two stories in the 1930s, and additions were made to the ell about 1960 and 2000. The main section was built about 1880, and is a two-story, frame I-house dwelling. It features a two-story portico. Both sections are sheathed in weatherboard.

It was listed on the National Register of Historic Places on June 2, 2004.
