= Dr. John G. & Nannie H. Barrett Farm =

Historic farm in North Carolina, United States

- U.S. National Register of Historic Places
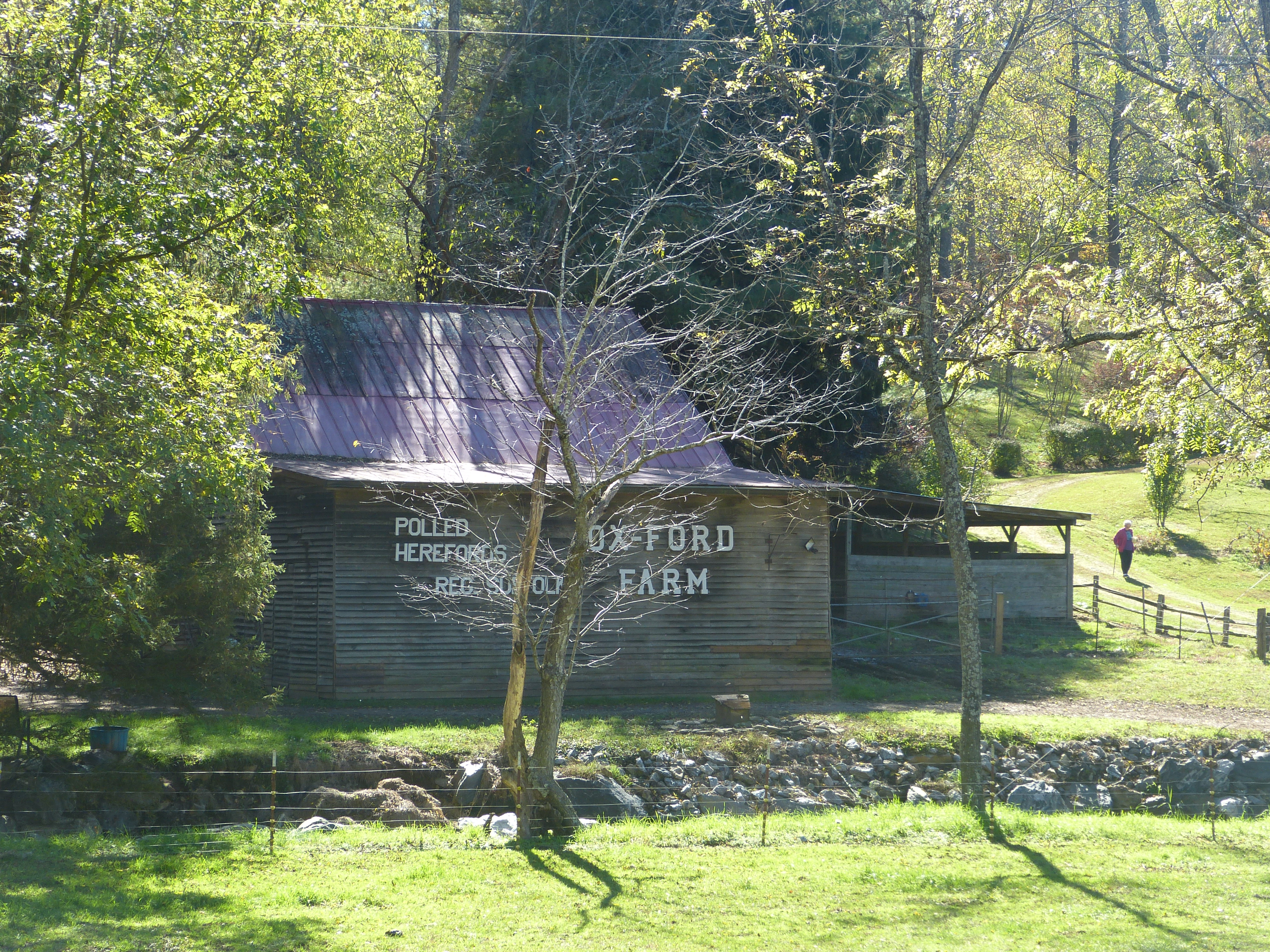

- Location within North Carolina Location within the United States
- Location: 75 Ox Creek Rd., near Weaverville, North Carolina
- Coordinates: 35°41′32″N 82°29′40″W
- Area: 54.02 acres (21.86 ha)
- Built: c. 1895
- NRHP reference No.: 13000245
- Added to NRHP: May 8, 2013

Dr. John G. & Nannie H. Barrett Farm, also known as Ox-Ford Farm, is a historic home and farm located near Weaverville, Buncombe County, North Carolina. The farmhouse was built about 1895, and is a vernacular, 1 1/2-story, single-pile frame dwelling. Also on the property are the contributing Lower (Old) Barn (c. 1895), Springhouse (c. 1895), Garage (c. 1935, 1980s), outhouse, and the surrounding farmlands and woodlands.

It was listed on the National Register of Historic Places in 2013.
