= Joseph P. Eller House =

Historic house in North Carolina, United States

- U.S. National Register of Historic Places
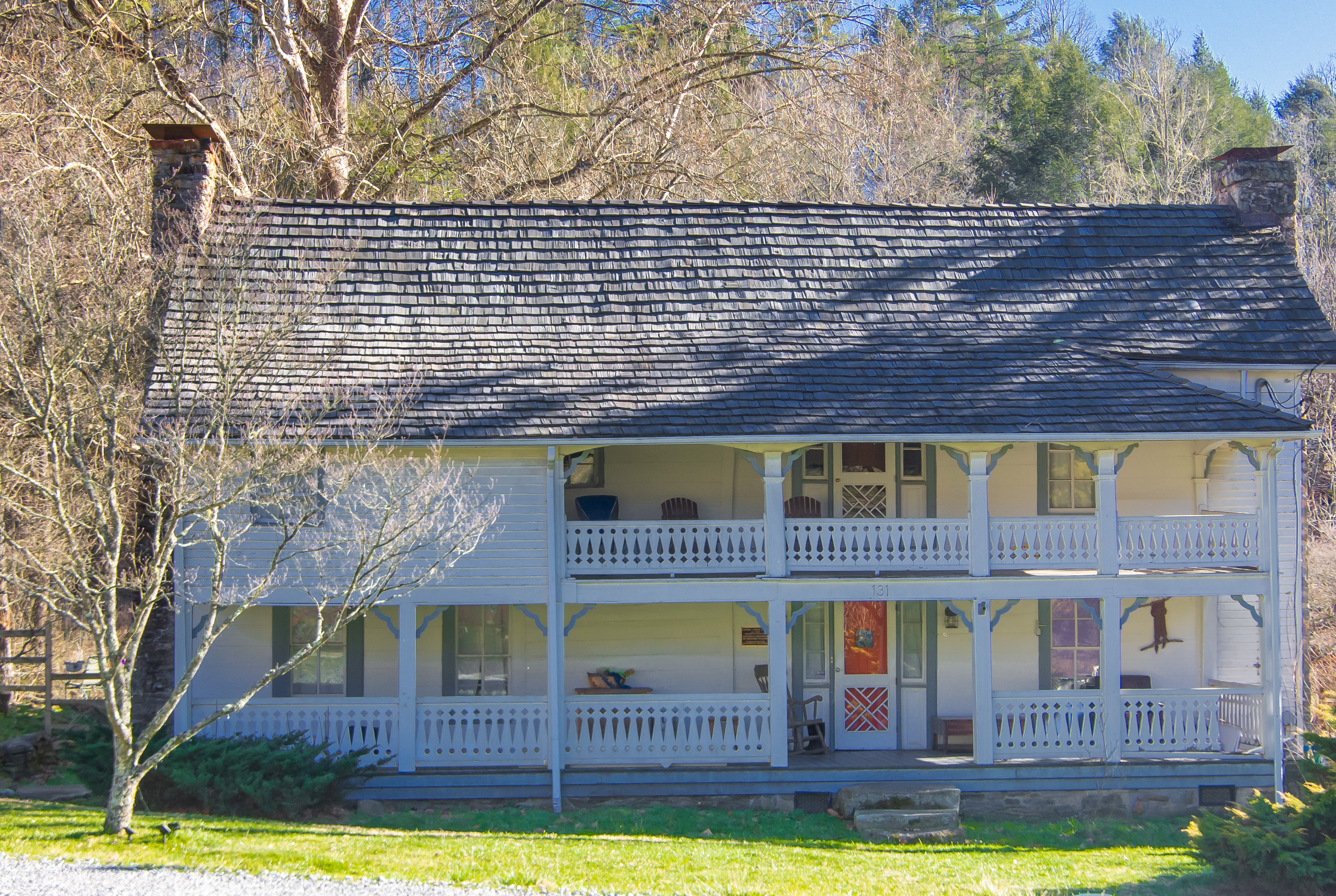

- Location within North Carolina Location within the United States
- Location: 494 Clarks' Chapel Rd., Weaverville, North Carolina
- Coordinates: 35°43′51″N 82°34′20″W
- Area: 6.5 acres (2.6 ha)
- Built: c. 1880
- Architectural style: I-house
- NRHP reference No.: 04000826
- Added to NRHP: August 11, 2004

The Joseph P. Eller House is a historic home located at Weaverville, Buncombe County, North Carolina. It was built about 1880, and is a two-story, frame I-house dwelling. It consists of a two-story main block with two-story portico and two-story rear ell. Also on the property are a contributing spring house and barn.

It was listed on the National Register of Historic Places in 2004.
