= Weaverville United Methodist Church =

Historic church in North Carolina, United States

- U.S. National Register of Historic Places
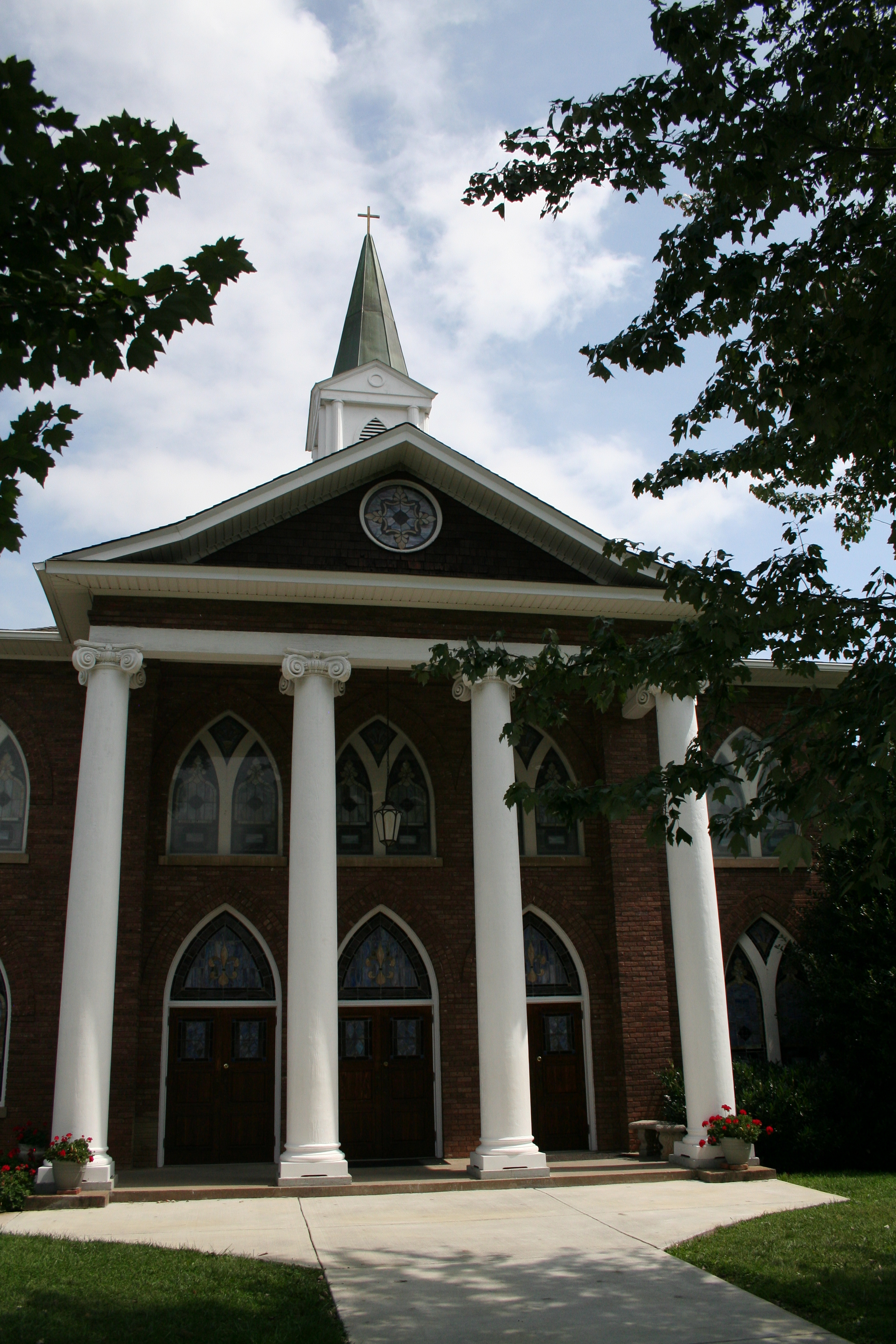

- Location within North Carolina Location within the United States
- Location: 85 N. Main St., Weaverville, North Carolina
- Coordinates: 35°41′57″N 82°33′37″W
- Area: 0.7 acres (0.28 ha)
- Built: 1919-1920
- Built by: Robinson, Zebulon Vance; Roberts, Douglas c.
- Architectural style: Classical Revival, Late Gothic Revival
- NRHP reference No.: 96000195
- Added to NRHP: March 1, 1996

Weaverville United Methodist Church is a historic United Methodist church located at Weaverville, Buncombe County, North Carolina. It was built in 1919–1920, and is a two-story, five-bay, brick church with Classical Revival and Late Gothic Revival design influences. The front facade features a two-story, three-bay portico. Attached to the church is the educational building constructed in 1956–1957.

It was listed on the National Register of Historic Places in 1996.
