= Everett W. Anderson =

United States Civil War Medal of Honor recipient

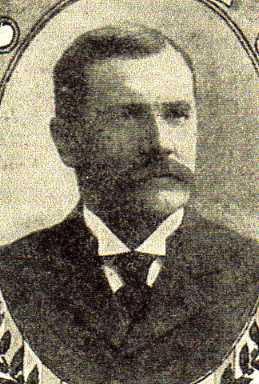
- Born: February 4, 1839; Phoenixville, Pennsylvania, U.S.
- Died: February 4, 1917 (aged 78)
- Burial place: Morris Cemetery, Phoenixville, Pennsylvania
- Military career
- Allegiance: United States
- Branch: United States Army; Union Army
- Service years: 1861 - 1865
- Rank: Sergeant
- Units: Company M, 15th Regiment Pennsylvania Volunteer Cavalry
- Conflicts: American Civil War
- Awards: Medal of Honor

Everett W. Anderson (July 12, 1839 - February 4, 1917) was an American soldier who received the Medal of Honor for valor during the American Civil War.

== Biography ==
Anderson served in the American Civil War in Company M, 15th Pennsylvania Cavalry for the Union Army. He received the Medal of Honor on December 3, 1894. He is the grandson of Isaac Anderson.

== Medal of Honor citation ==
Citation:

Captured, single-handed, Confederate Brig. Gen. Robert B. Vance during a charge upon the enemy.

== See also ==
- List of American Civil War Medal of Honor recipients: A–F
