= Robert B. Vance =

American politician

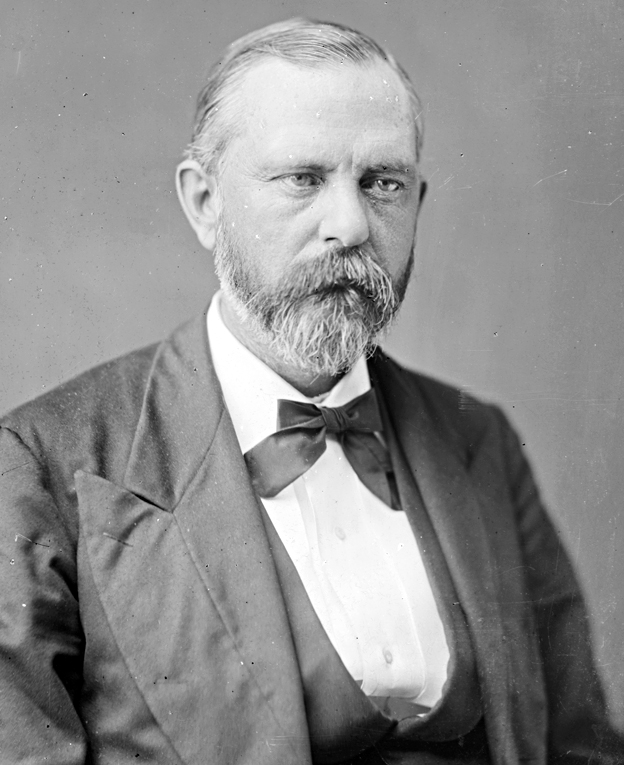

Member of the North Carolina House of Representatives from Buncombe County
- In office January 4, 1893 – January 9, 1895
- Preceded by: J. P. Lowery
- Succeeded by: Virgil S. Lusk

Member of the U.S. House of Representatives from North Carolina's 8th district
- In office March 4, 1873 – March 3, 1885
- Preceded by: Zebulon B. Vance (prior to Civil War, 1861)
- Succeeded by: William H. H. Cowles

Personal details
- Born: Robert Brank Vance; April 24, 1828 Buncombe, North Carolina
- Died: November 28, 1899 (aged 71) Asheville, North Carolina
- Party: Democratic
- Spouse(s): Harriett V. McElroy (1851); Lizzie R. Cook (1892)
- Parent(s): David Vance Jr. Mira Margaret Baird
- Profession: Farmer, merchant

Military service
- Allegiance: Confederate States
- Branch/service: Confederate States Army
- Years of service: 1861–1865
- Rank: Brigadier general
- Battles/wars: American Civil War

Robert Brank Vance (April 24, 1828 – November 28, 1899), nephew of the earlier Congressman Robert Brank Vance (1793–1827) and brother of Zebulon B. Vance, was a North Carolina Democratic politician who served as a member of the U.S. House of Representatives for six terms (1873–1885). He was chairman of the United States House Committee on Patents. During the American Civil War, Vance served in the Confederate States Army, where he reached the rank of brigadier general.

== Early life ==
=== Birth and family ===
Vance was born in 1828, near present-day Weaverville, in the old homestead on Reems Creek, at Buncombe County, North Carolina. He was eldest son of David Vance II and Mira Margaret Baird. He was a grandson of David Vance and of Zebulon Baird, both members of the North Carolina General Assembly.

He was named for his paternal uncle, Robert Brank Vance, a former congressman who was killed in a duel during his 1827 campaign.

Vance came from a Scotch-Irish, slave-owning family, with a history of military and public service, including his paternal grandfather, who served in the Revolutionary War, and his own father, who fought in the War of 1812. His younger brother was Zebulon B. Vance.

=== Childhood ===
Vance had always grown up around slaves. When he was twelve, his father owned 12 slaves, the names of which eight are known – Sandy, Leah, Ann, Aggy, May, Bob, Richard and Venus. Venus, the eldest of his father's slaves, had raised Vance and his siblings, and was referred as "Mammy Venus."

In total, the slaves tended to the Vance children, cooked the family's meals, made the housing wares, fetched the water, cultivated the farm crops, and, otherwise, allowing Vance to spend his formative years pursuing his education and reading the classics from a 500-volume library that his family inherited from his uncle.

=== Political career ===
Like his brother, Zeb, Vance was a Whig who subscribed to the political philosophy of Henry Clay.

When Vance was twenty, he was elected clerk of the Buncombe County Court of Common Pleas and Quarter Sessions, the position his father held until his death. Rather than seek re-election, in 1858, he decided to become a merchant in Asheville. Later, he became the joint Secretary and Treasurer of the Holston Conference Female College before it closed during the war.

During the 1860 presidential election, Vance supported the Constitutional Union Party candidate, John Bell.

Following the election, Vance remained a devout Federalist, until President Lincoln began organizing troops, after southern states began seceding from the Union just a month after the election.

== Civil War ==
Vance entered the Confederacy forming the "Buncombe County Life Guards" (later, Company H of the 29th North Carolina Infantry Regiment). After training at Camp Patton, in Asheville, Vance was unanimously elected as the regiment's colonel.

The regiment was sent to eastern Tennessee to guard the bridges on the Bristol-Chattanooga road. They all took up position at the Cumberland Gap, seeing their first real action on March 24, 1862. They later accompanied Edmund Kirby Smith into Kentucky, and on December 30, 1862, Vance commanded the brigade of James E. Rains, after his death, at the Battle of Murfreesboro. There were many casualties in the brigade, with Vance's own horse killed beneath him by a shell. After the battle, Vance had to step down from his post as he contracted typhoid fever, but he was commended for his service by General John P. McCown, which led to Jefferson Davis commissioning him as brigadier general on March 4, 1863.

=== Capture ===
After a lengthy recovery from his illness, Vance was placed in charge of the North Carolina–Tennessee mountains under the command of General Braxton Bragg, with orders to harass the Union flanks and disrupt the flow of enemy supplies.

On January 14, 1864, he was assigned a mission at Cosby Creek, Tennessee. Vance intercepted a major supply train going to General Ambrose Burnside's troops near Knoxville, but when he tried to take the wagons to North Carolina, Vance, and nearly all of his troops, were captured by Sergeant Everett W. Anderson of the 15th Pennsylvania Cavalry.

=== Imprisonment ===
Vance was detained at various Union prisons in Nashville, Louisville, Fort Chase (Ohio), and Fort Delaware until a former prisoner of Vance's, Reverend Nathaniel G. Taylor, intervened on Vance's behalf, as Vance had treated him well and, eventually, released him

President Lincoln issued Vance a special parole, allowing him to buy clothes for other Confederate soldiers. On March 10, 1865, Lincoln granted Vance a conditional full pardon, allowing him to return to North Carolina, but requiring him not to fight again.

== Post-War career ==
In 1872, Vance ran as a Democrat, and won the congressional seat once held by his uncle and brother. He served six terms, from 1873 to 1885. During that time he missed 340 of 2,301 (15 percent) of his roll call votes.

While in office, he obtained appropriations for every county in his district to get daily mail delivery, and to have the French Broad River dredged from Brevard to Asheville for transportation.

He sat on the Committee on Pensions for Veterans of the War of 1812, the Committee on Coinage, and was the four-term Chairman of the Committee on Patents.

It is unclear whether Vance declined reelection or lost his seat in 1884.

After leaving Congress, Vance was appointed assistant commissioner of patents by President Grover Cleveland. He also became a member of the North Carolina General Assembly in 1893, where he served one term until 1895.

== Personal life ==
=== Family and faith ===
Vance married Harriett V. McElroy in 1851. They had six children, two of whom died before adulthood. Harriet died in 1885.

In 1892, he married Lizzie R. Cook. They had no children.

Vance was a member of the Methodist Episcopal Church, South.

=== Slaves ===
Prior to the start of the war in 1860, Robert owned seven slaves, including a 32-year-old female slave and two mulatto children, aged 2 and 1.

=== Freemasonry ===
Vance was a Master Mason of Mount Hermon Lodge #118, in Asheville, in 1866, 1867 and 1873. He was Grand Master of Masons of North Carolina in 1868 and 1869.

=== Poetry ===
Vance was a published poet. He released the following collections of his work:

- Heart-throbs from the Mountains (some pieces were written while he was imprisoned in Fort Delaware)
- Oneka
- The White Plume of the Cherokee
- Shadows of Mountain Life

== Death ==
Vance died near Asheville, North Carolina, at his farm, on November 28, 1899.

He and his brother, Zebulon, are interred at Riverside Cemetery in Asheville.

== See also ==
- List of American Civil War generals (Confederate)

U.S. House of Representatives
Preceded by Civil War	Member of the U.S. House of Representatives from North Carolina's 8th congressional district 1873–1885	Succeeded by William H. H. Cowles
