= Felix Walker (American politician) =

American politician from North Carolina (1753 – 1828)

Felix Walker (July 19, 1753 – 1828) was a Democratic-Republican U.S. Congressman from North Carolina between 1817 and 1823.

Walker was born near the Potomac River in what was then Hampshire County, Virginia, now part of West Virginia. His family moved to near Columbia, South Carolina, and then to Lincoln County, North Carolina, and finally to present-day Rutherford County, North Carolina.

In 1769, he was hired as a merchant's clerk in Charleston, South Carolina. He worked as a farmer briefly and later joined Daniel Boone's company, which established the settlement of Boonesborough, Kentucky, in 1775. He was named clerk of the court of Washington district of North Carolina in 1775 and held that post until 1778 (Washington district lay mostly within the boundaries of contemporary Tennessee and was organized as a county in 1777.

Walker fought in the American Revolutionary War, then returned to Rutherford County, North Carolina, where he was clerk of the county court there from 1779 to 1787. He was sent to the North Carolina House of Commons on several occasions—in 1792 from 1799 to 1802, and 1806. He worked as a trader and land speculator in Haywood County before being elected to Congress.

In 1816, Walker was elected to the 15th United States Congress as a Democratic-Republican. He was re-elected twice and failed in a bid for the fourth term in 1822. In 1824, Walker moved to Mississippi and died in Clinton in 1828.

In 1820 Felix Walker, who represented Buncombe County, North Carolina, in the U.S. House of Representatives, rose to address the question of admitting Missouri as a free or slave state. This was his first attempt to speak on this subject after nearly a month of solid debate and right before the vote was to be called. Allegedly, to the exasperation of his colleagues, Walker insisted on delivering a long and wearisome "speech for Buncombe." He was shouted down by his colleagues. His persistent effort made "buncombe" (later respelled "bunkum") a synonym for meaningless political claptrap and later for any kind of nonsense. Although he was unable to make the speech in front of Congress it was still published in a Washington newspaper.

U.S. House of Representatives
Preceded by Israel Pickens	Member of the U.S. House of Representatives from North Carolina's 12th congressional district 1817–1823	Succeeded by Robert Brank Vance
