= Robert Brank Vance =

American politician (1793–1827)

Member of the U.S. House of Representatives from North Carolina's 12th district
- In office March 4, 1823 – March 3, 1825
- Preceded by: Felix Walker
- Succeeded by: Samuel P. Carson

Personal details
- Born: 1793 near Asheville, North Carolina, U.S.
- Died: November 1827 (aged 33–34) Saluda, North Carolina, U.S.
- Cause of death: Duel
- Party: Democratic-Republican
- Parent: David Vance (father)
- Relatives: Robert B. Vance (nephew); Zebulon Baird Vance (nephew)
- Occupation: Politician; physician

Robert Brank Vance (1793 – November 1827) was a congressional representative from North Carolina.

== Early life ==
Robert Brank Vance was born in 1793 on Reems Creek, near Asheville, North Carolina, to Priscilla (née Brank) and David Vance. He was named after his uncle Robert Brank, who served with his maternal grandfather at the Battle of Kings Mountain. His father served with the 2nd North Carolina Continental Regiment during the Revolutionary War and was a member of the U.S. House of Representatives. Vance was the uncle of Robert B. Vance and Zebulon Baird Vance. In his youth, he had an ailment in his left leg that stunted his growth.

Vance was raised as a Presbyterian. He attended common schools and Newton Academy in Asheville. He studied medicine at the medical school of Dr. Charles Harris in Cabarrus County.

== Career ==
In 1818, Vance practiced medicine in Asheville; serving as the area's first physician. He left his practice after three years when he won a lottery of US$5,000 and his father's inheritance. He held different local offices. He served as a Jackson Republican member of the U.S. House of Representatives, representing North Carolina, from March 4, 1823, to March 3, 1825 (Eighteenth Congress). He won the 1823 election with a one-vote majority. He ran unsuccessfully for re-election in 1824 and in 1826.

== Duel and death ==
On the campaign trail of 1826, Vance accused his friend and competitor Samuel Price Carson of taking money from the public while campaigning in Asheville. Vance made another remark in Morganton about Carson's father's Tory allegiance during the Revolutionary War. Silas McDowell quoted Vance:

In the time of the Revolutionary War, my father, Colonel Vance, stood up to the fight, while my competitor's father, Colonel Carson, skulked, and took British protection.

Following the remark, Carson challenged Vance to a duel in a letter he wrote at Pleasant Gardens on September 12, 1827. He posted the letter from Tennessee to circumvent North Carolina laws against dueling. The duel was held in November 1827 at Old Buncombe Road, Saluda Gap in South Carolina, just over the border from North Carolina. Carson's seconds were General Alney Burgin and Warren Davis. The second for Vance was General Franklin Patton. Davy Crockett was said to be a witness to the duel, as a friend of Carson's. Vance was shot in the side. He was carried to a nearby hotel and died there the following day. He was buried in the family burial ground on Reems Creek.

== See also ==
- List of duels in the United States

U.S. House of Representatives
Preceded by Felix Walker	Member of the U.S. House of Representatives from North Carolina's 12th congressional district 1823–1825	Succeeded by Samuel P. Carson
