= Old Buncombe Road =

Historical route in the southeastern United States

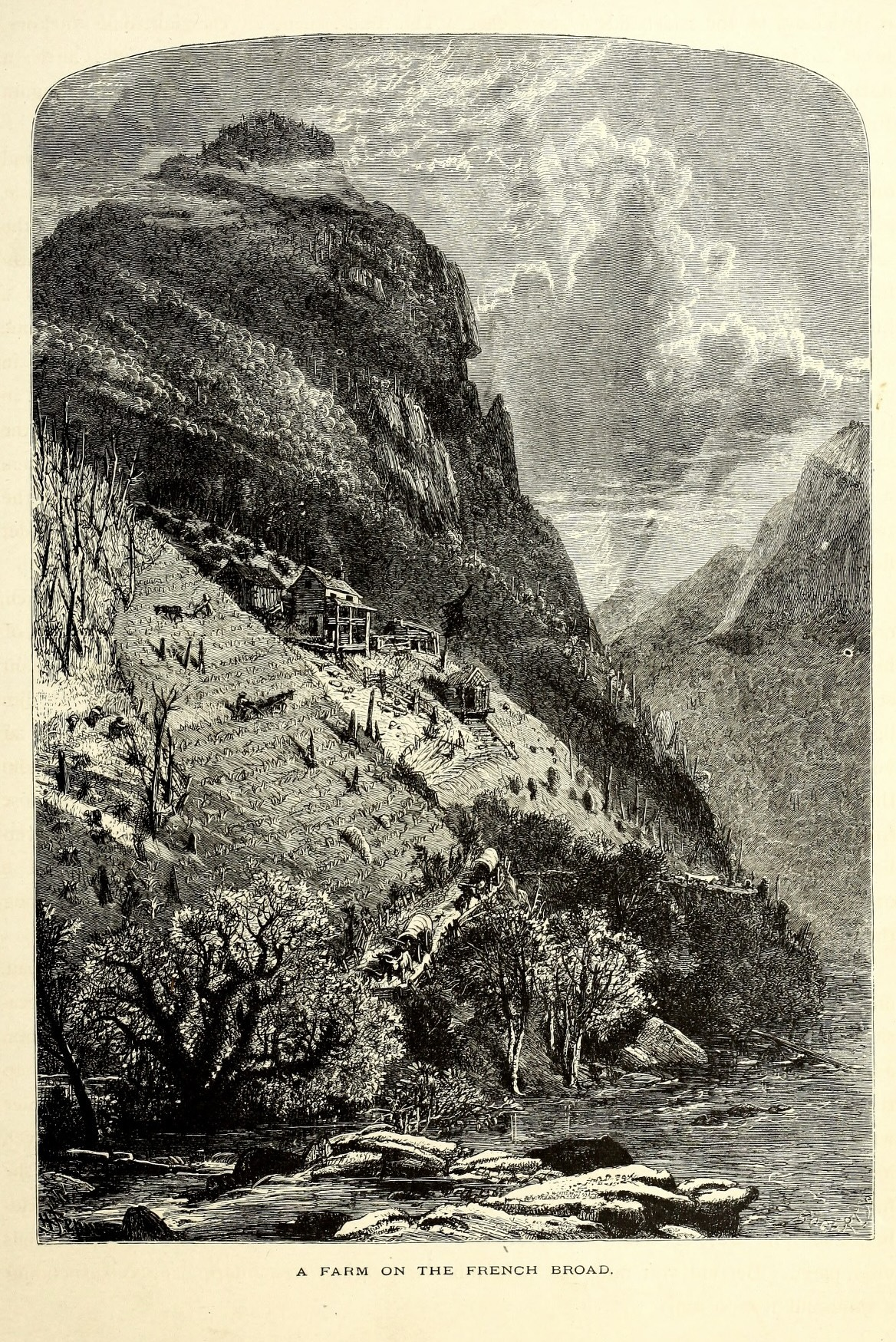
"A Farm on the French Broad" engraving by Harry Fenn showing wagons on the Buncombe road, engraving published 1872 in Picturesque America

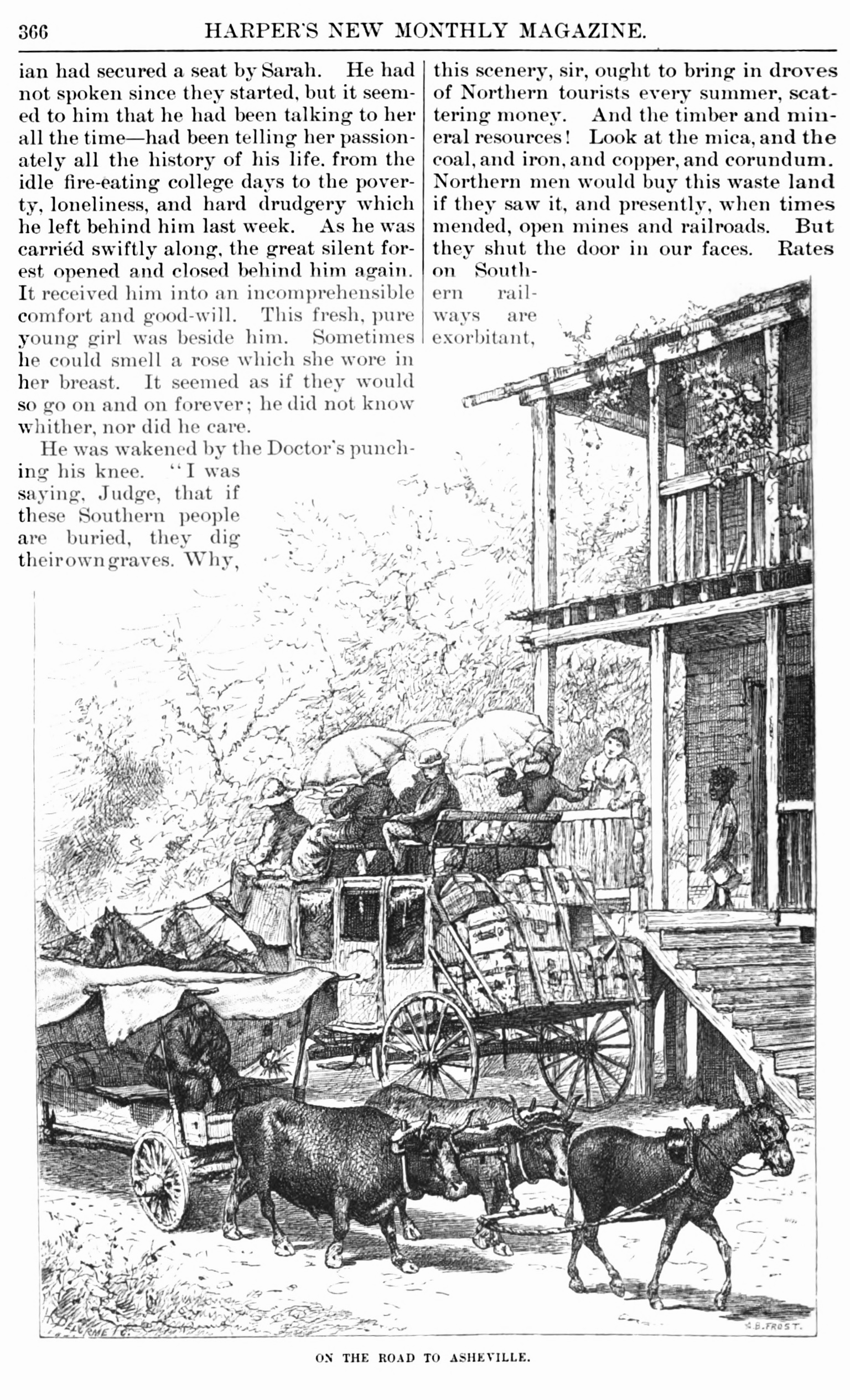
"On the road to Asheville" (Harper's Monthly, 1880)

The Old Buncombe Road, also known, wholly or in part, as the Catawba Trail, the Drovers' Road, the Old Charleston Road, the Saluda Gap Road, the Saluda Mountain Road, the Old Warm Springs Road, and the Buncombe Turnpike, was a 19th-century wagon road in North America connecting the Carolinas to Kentucky and Tennessee, which had access by river to the markets of the lower Mississippi River valley. It was used both by migrants and as a trade route for driving stock animals to market.

== History ==
The road was part of an indigenous trade route called the Catawba Trail. According to the Smithsonian's Bureau of Ethnology, "The Catawba Trail (No. 33) ran southeast from the trail junction at Cumberland Gap, passed Tazewell, Tate Springs, Morristown, and Witts, near which it crossed the Great Indian Warpath, then went on near Rankin, and Newport, east from a point south of Newport to Paint Rock, and up the French Broad in North Carolina, diverging east to Stocksville, passing near Asheville, and then southeast through Hendersonville, N. C., into South Carolina, where it became what was later known as the Old South Carolina State Road to the north (No. 78). This preserved the same general direction to the Congarees (Columbia) and Charleston." This trail was the most direct route through the Appalachian Mountains (and points beyond) from the Carolinas, such that "great six-horse wagons dragged themselves through this mountain highway, sliding down through Saluda Gap into Greenville District, South Carolina. The first easy way to market was down the Holston and into the Tennessee River to Chattanooga, but soon the Tennessee unobligingly broke navigation at the Muscle Shoals..."

The route began in Charleston, South Carolina, on the Atlantic coast, wended northwest via North Carolina (following the French Broad River past Asheville), finishing at Knoxville, Greeneville, and Jonesborough in East Tennessee. The South Carolina sections included the Greenville Road in the Greenville District and the State Road through the Spartanburg District. The section from Charleston to Columbia, South Carolina was known as the State Road. A history of Spartanburg County states, "The Buncombe Road probably originated as a path from the Congarees trading post near Columbia, and led into the Cherokee country of upper Greenville County and beyond. Entering Spartanburg County near the present town of Enoree, this road ran along the ridge separating the Enoree and Tyger watersheds and passed into Greenville County near Greer." The first wagon came through the Saluda gap in 1793. In 1803 Phillip Hoodenpile oversaw the construction of a "fairly good road" between the Hot Springs and Newport, Tennessee.

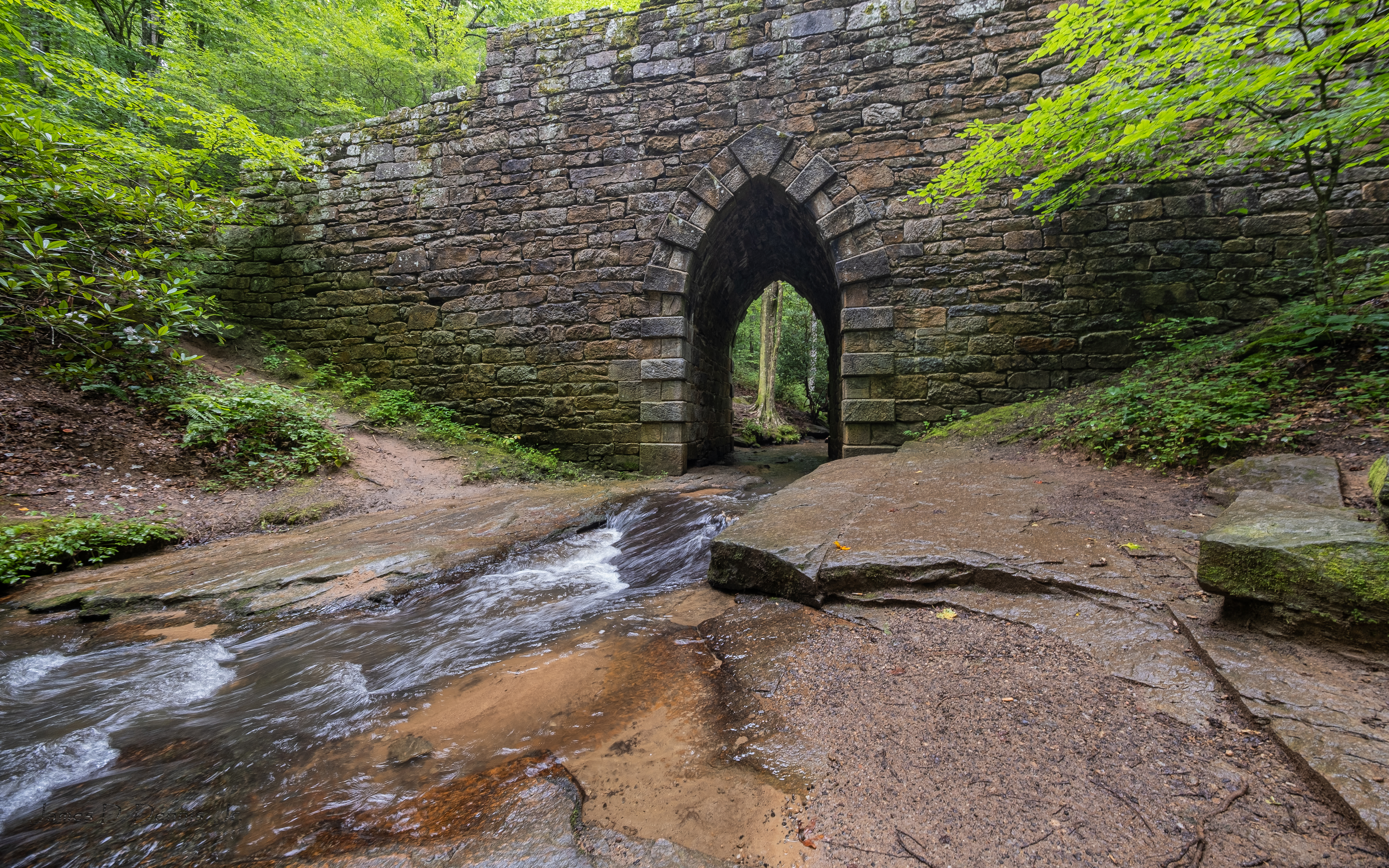
Poinsett Bridge (2020)

The Buncombe Turnpike passed through the Saluda Gap in the Appalachian mountain range. Around 1820, Joel Poinsett laid out the connection from Columbia "by Newberry and Greenville, on up thru the Saluda mountains, winding up and down Chestnut, Callahan, Old Indian and the other rough peaks, to enter into North Carolina at Saluda Gap, not far from where the present highway crosses the state line." He oversaw the construction of the Poinsett Bridge along the route. Approximately 500 men worked on building the road. As of 1825, the road needed repairs along a five-mile section between Asheville and the South Carolina state line. A toll gate was opened on the turnpike in 1827. The 1827 duel that killed Robert Brank Vance (at which Davy Crockett was present), took place at the state line on the Buncombe Road. In Greenville, South Carolina there was a connecting road to Augusta, Georgia. The full Buncombe Turnpike opened in 1828 with toll gates every 10 miles and stands (or rest stops) developed a flourishing trade. The road was traveled by traders escorting "droves of horses, mules and hogs...Every five or six miles along the Buncombe road, and also below Greenville, were taverns or houses of entertainment." In 1828, during the lead up to the presidential election with its debates over tariffs and internal improvements, South Carolina planter and former Congressman David R. Williams wrote, "It has been satisfactorily ascertained that there are brought into this State over the Saluda mountain road alone, from the West, US$1,500,000 (equivalent to $43,977,273 in 2025) worth of live stock annually."

British tourist J. S. Buckingham rode in one of the stage coaches that regularly traveled between Charleston and Asheville and recorded, "While on the left we could almost drop a stone into the water from the carriage window on that side, we could put out our hands and touch the rock of the perpendicular cliff on the other."

The construction of the Asheville and Greenville Plank Road during the plank road craze of the 1850s resulted in decreased maintenance of the Buncombe Turnpike and a decline in use. The Turnpike and the Plank Road were the first two "chartered roads" in Western North Carolina, which established tolls and did not use community volunteers or tax money for maintenance. The construction of the Western North Carolina Railway dried up what remained of the traffic for freight and cargo, and the commercial traffic on the road ended in the 1880s.

== Additional images ==
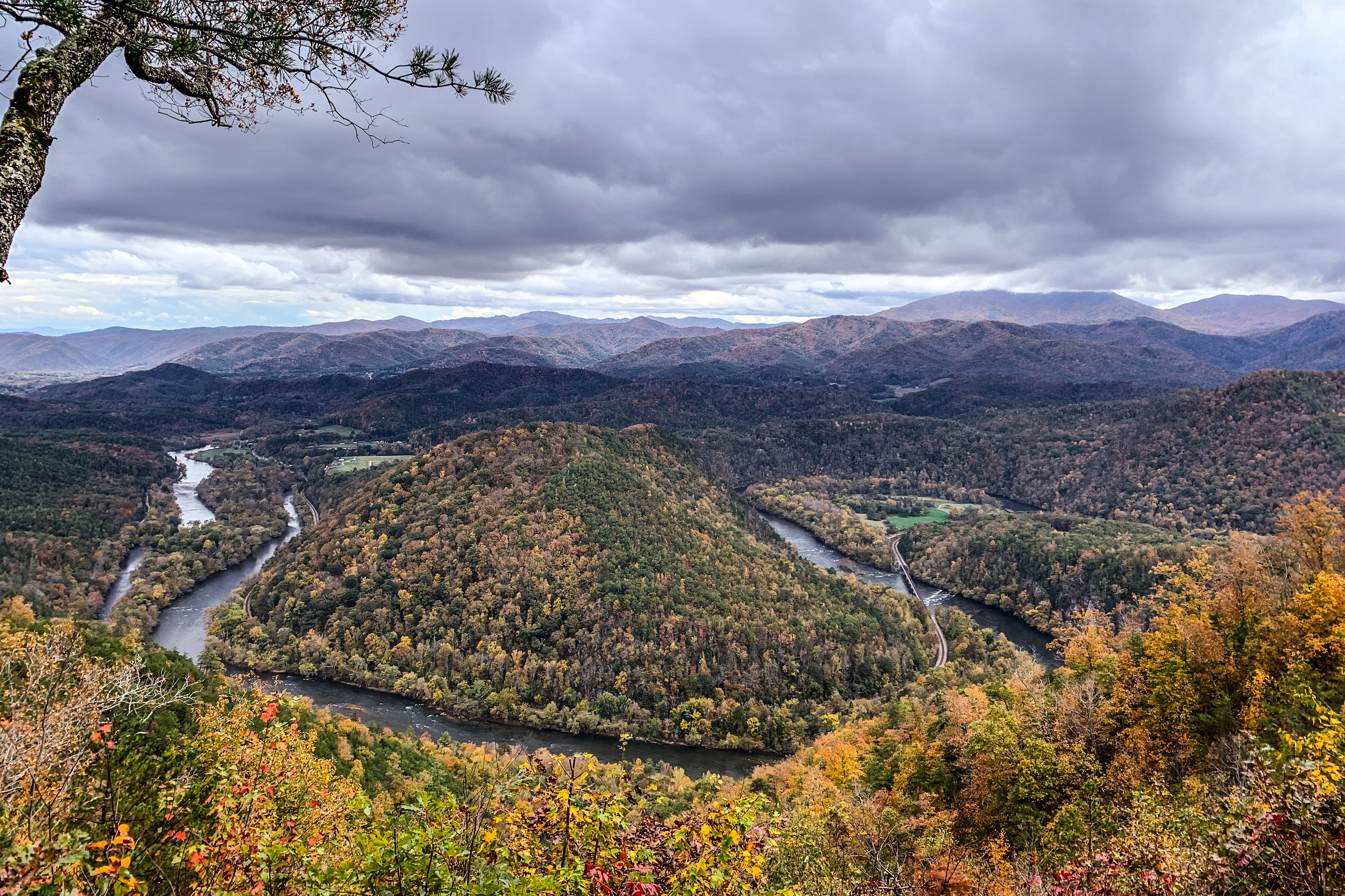
French Broad River in Cherokee National Forest (2020)

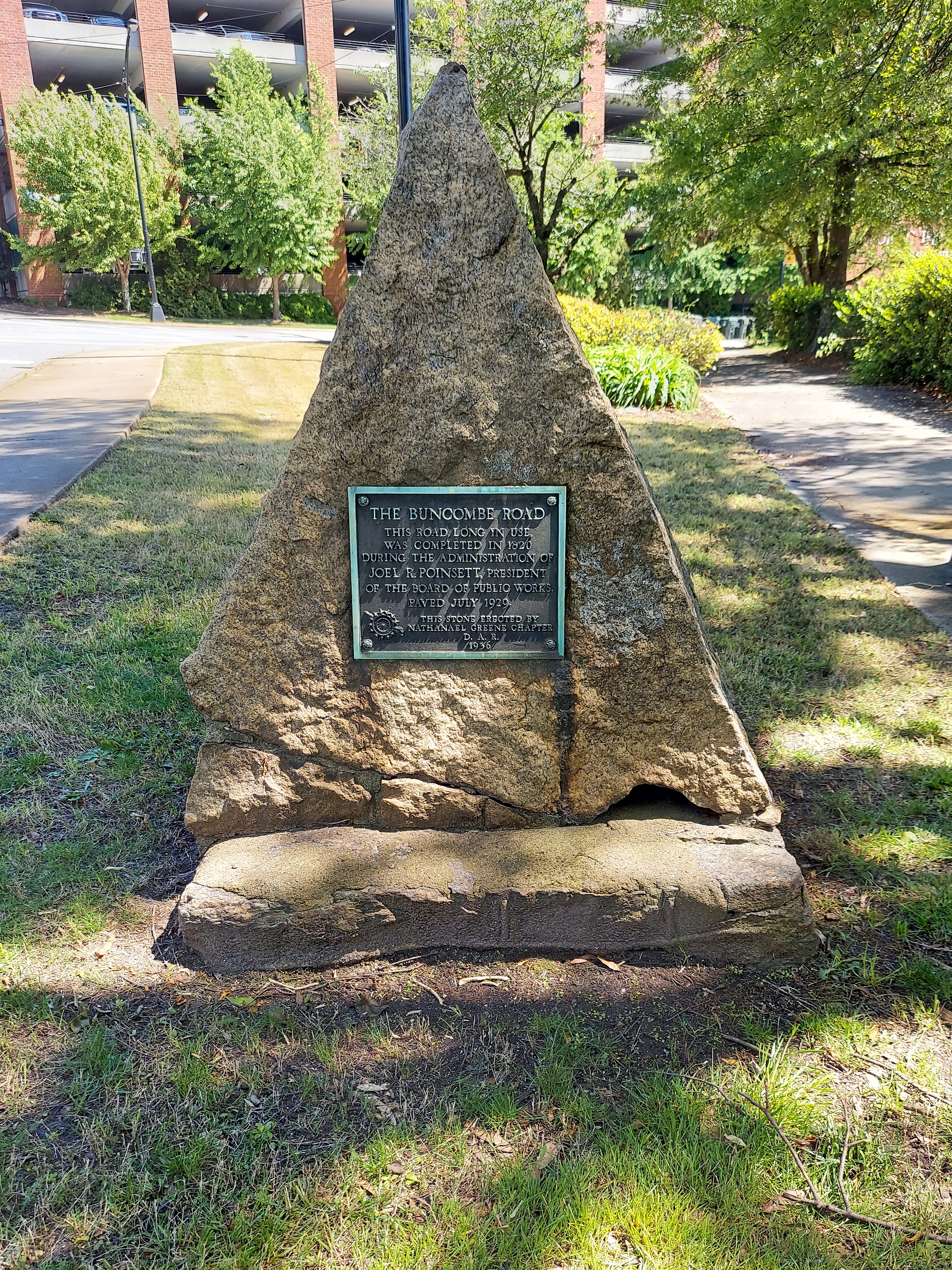
Marker in Greenville, South Carolina commemorating the construction of the Buncombe Turnpike in 1820 (2023)

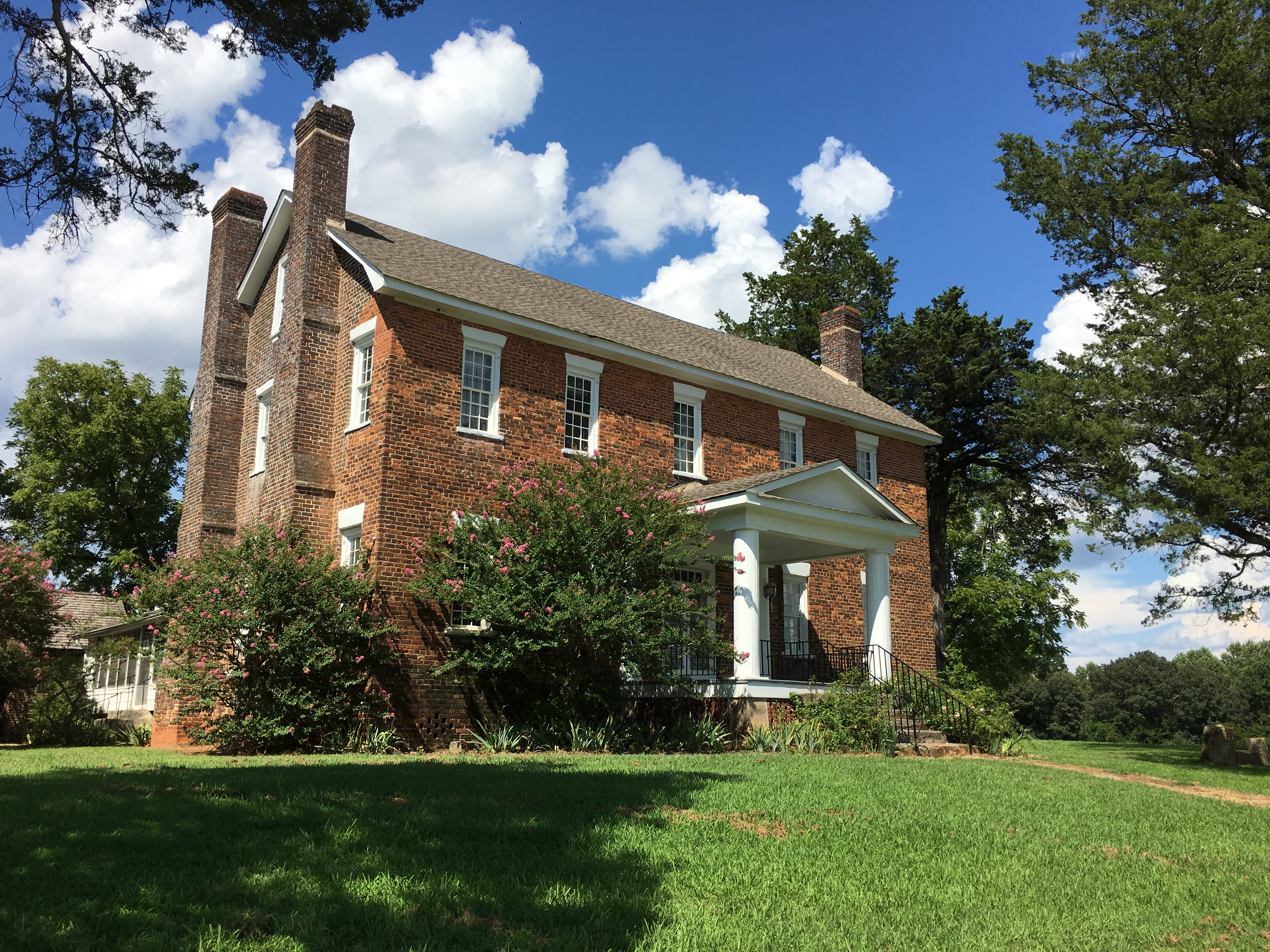
Cross Keys House built in the 1810s at the intersection of the Piedmont Stage Road and the Old Buncombe Road (2018)

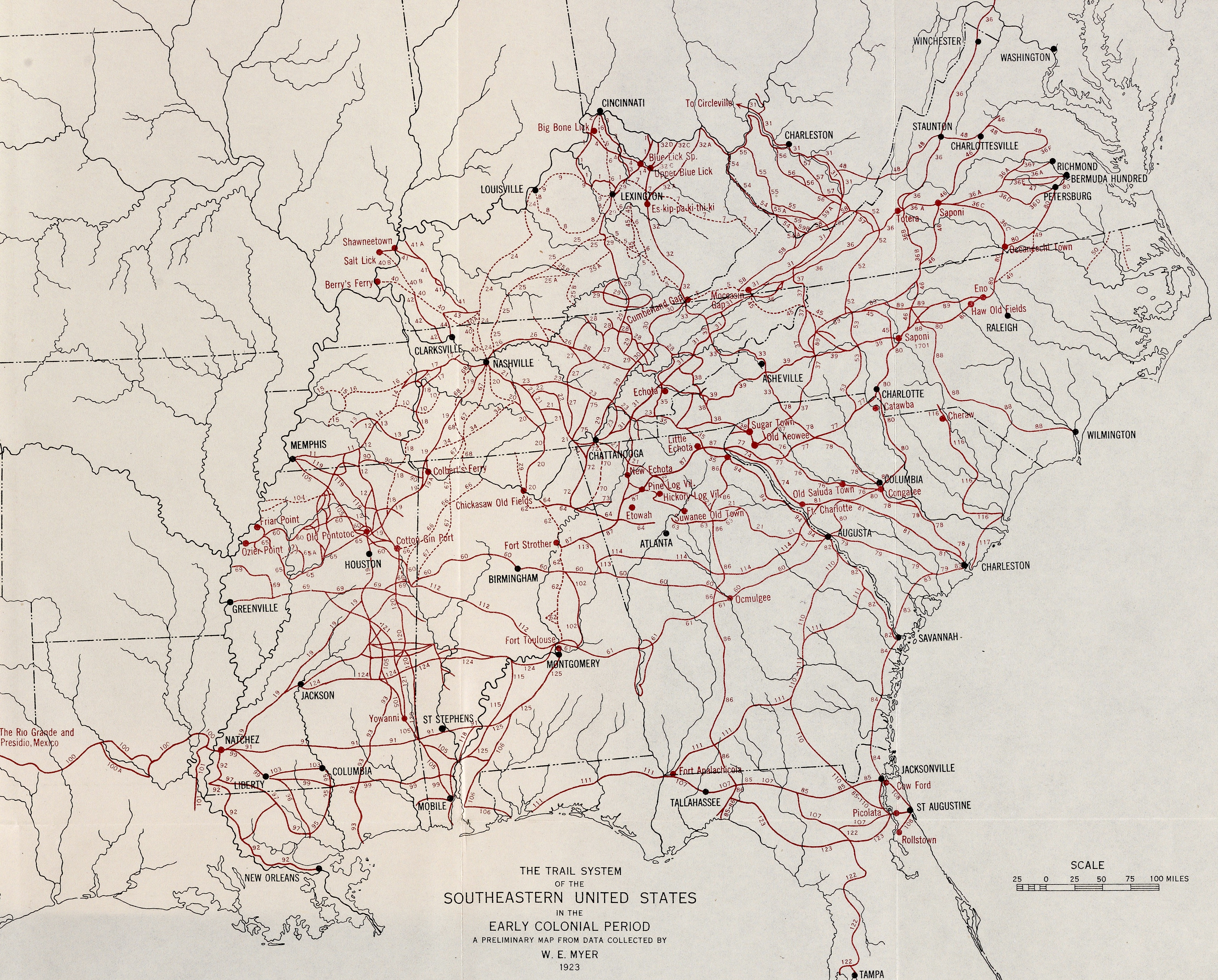
The Catawba Trail (No. 33) and Old South Carolina State Road (No. 78) were the Old Buncombe Road; map by William Edward Myer, "Indian Trails of the Southeast," 42d Annual Report of the Bureau of American Ethnology, Smithsonian Institution (GPO, 1928), plate 15

== See also ==
- Interstate 26
- U.S. Route 25
- Cumberland Road
- Philadelphia Wagon Road
- Timeline of Asheville, North Carolina
- Swannanoa Gap - northeast of the Saluda Gap
- Western North Carolina
- East Tennessee
