= Vinzons (disambiguation) =

Vinzons is a municipality in the Philippines. Vinzons may also refer to:

== People ==
- Wenceslao Vinzons (1910–1942), Filipino patriot
- Liwayway Vinzons-Chato (born 1945), Filipino politician
- Roi Vinzon (born 1953), Filipino actor

== Other uses ==
- Vinzons Pilot High School, high school in the Philippines
- Vinzons Pilot Elementary School, elementary school in the Philippines
