= Poinsett Bridge =

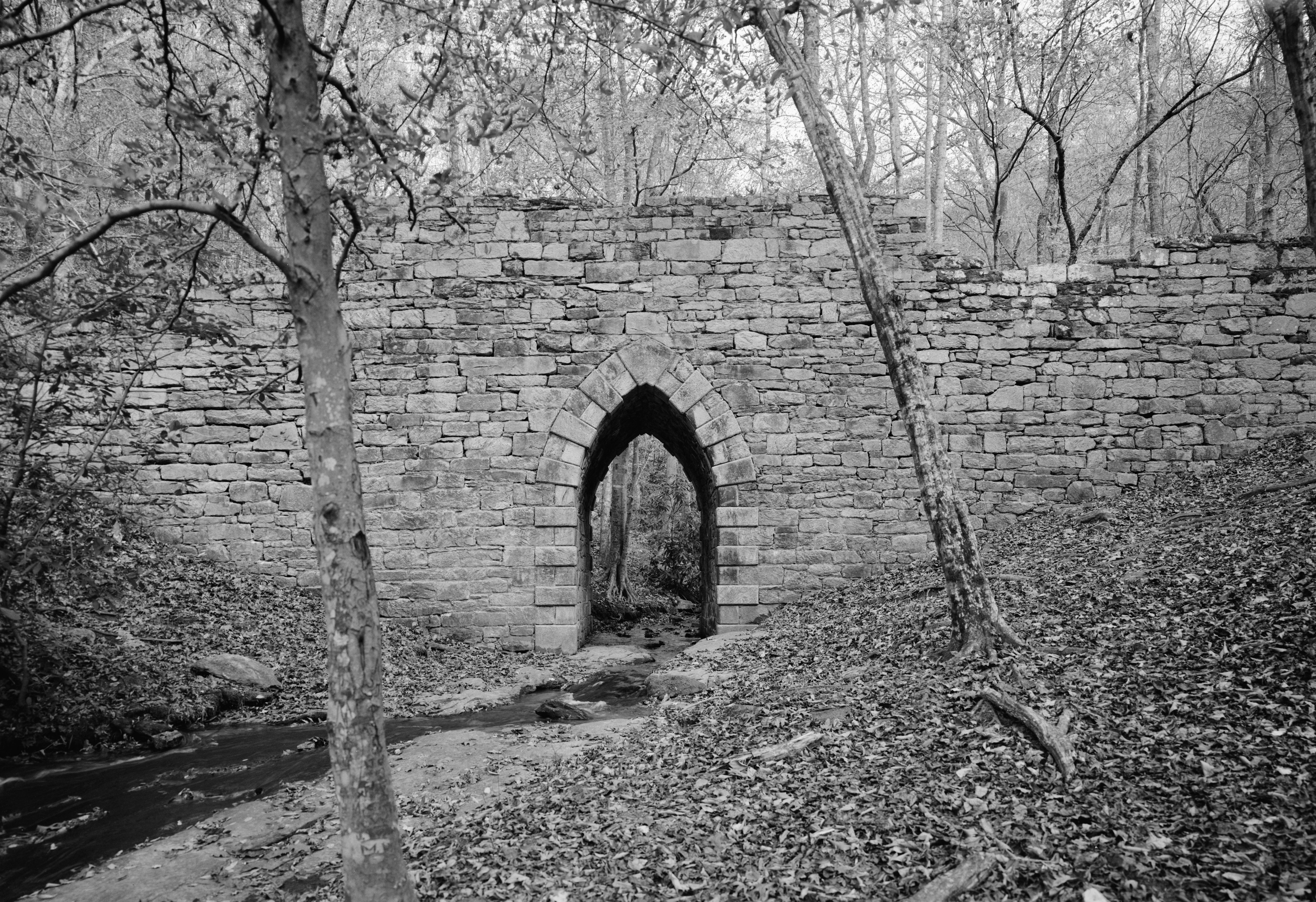
- Poinsett Bridge
- Coordinates: 35°07′44″N 82°23′02″W
- Crosses: Little Gap Creek
- Locale: Greenville County, South Carolina

Characteristics
- Total length: 130 feet (40 m)
- Clearance above: 15 feet (5 m)

Statistics
- Toll
- Poinsett Bridge
- U.S. National Register of Historic Places
- Location within South Carolina Location within the United States
- Nearest city: Tigerville, South Carolina
- Coordinates: 35°07′46.1″N 82°23′03.4″W
- Area: 6 acres (2.4 ha)
- Built: 1820
- NRHP reference No.: 70000590
- Added to NRHP: October 22, 1970

Location
- Interactive map of Poinsett Bridge

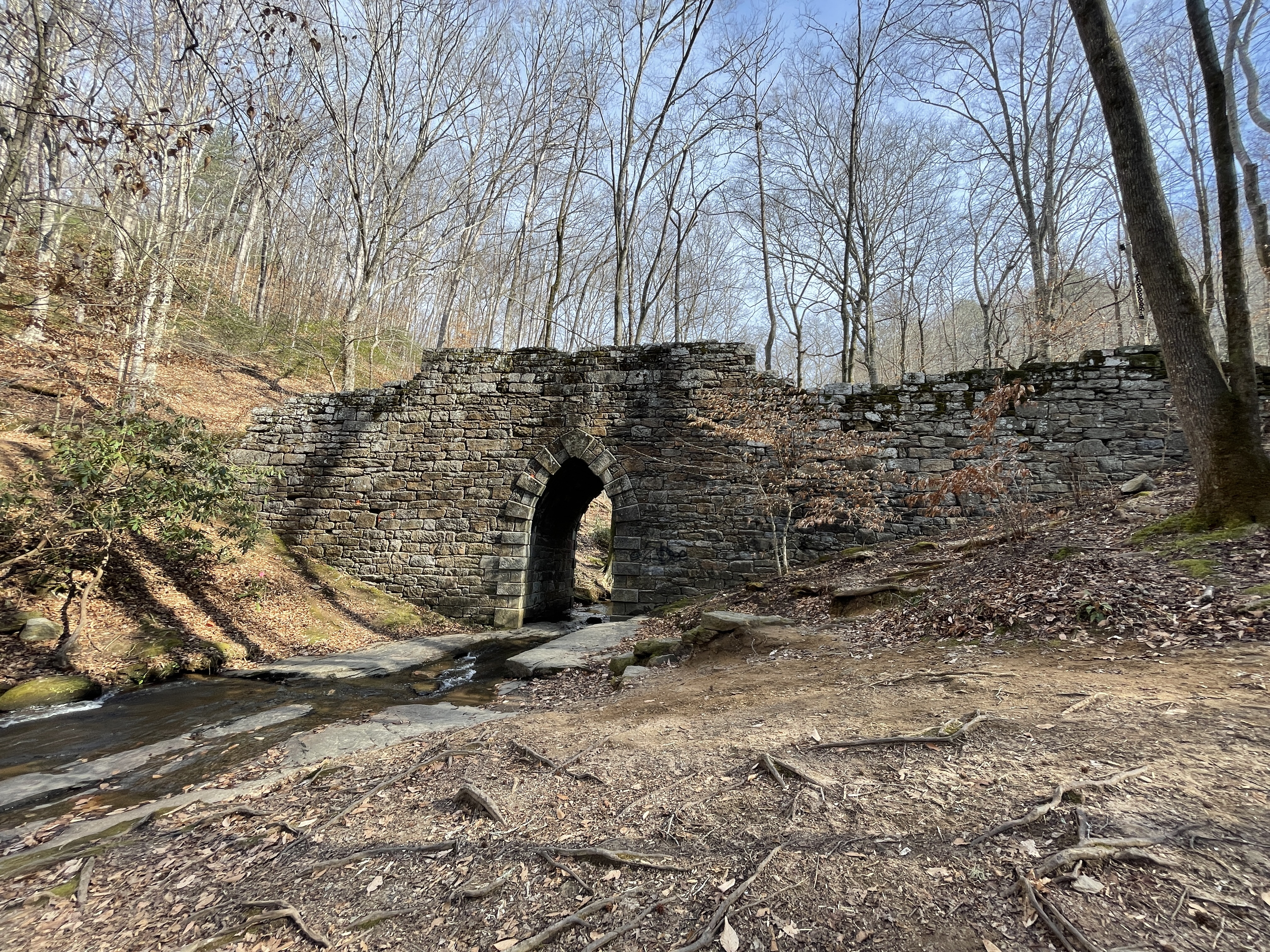
Poinsett Bridge from afar

Poinsett Bridge is the oldest bridge in South Carolina and perhaps in the entire southeastern United States. Named for Joel Roberts Poinsett, it was built in 1820 as part of the Old Buncombe Road from Columbia, South Carolina, to Saluda Mountain. The stone bridge, which includes a 14-foot (4.3 m) Gothic arch and stretches 130 feet (40 m) over Little Gap Creek, may have been designed by Robert Mills, architect of the Washington Monument. Though no longer in use, the bridge remains largely intact and is part of the 400-acre (161.9 ha) Poinsett Bridge Heritage Preserve. There is a nature trail a few hundred yards from the bridge. The bridge, about which ghost stories have been told for decades, is located off U.S. Highway 25 north of Greenville, South Carolina. The bridge was added to the National Register of Historic Places in 1970.

== See also ==
- List of bridges documented by the Historic American Engineering Record in South Carolina
