= Zebulon B. Vance Birthplace =

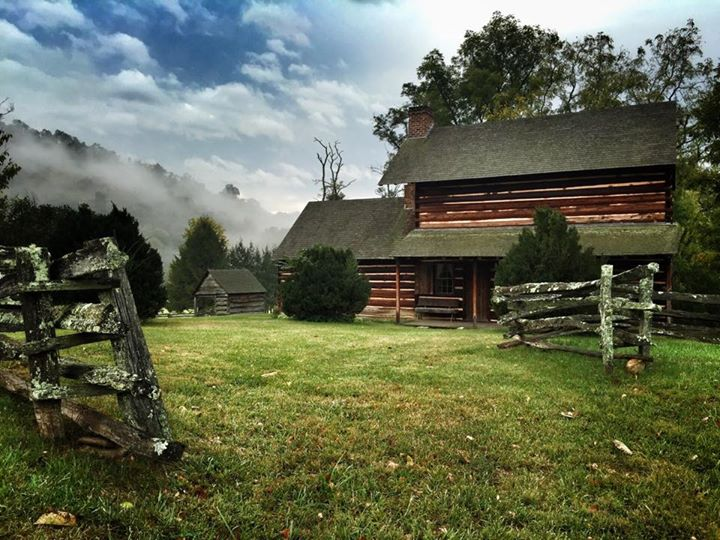
- The Vance house was rebuilt in 1960-61 around the original 1790s brick fireplace

- Location within North Carolina Location within the United States
- 35°42′4″N 82°29′47″W
- Location: 911 Reems Creek Rd., Weaverville, Buncombe County, North Carolina

History
- Built: 1790s

The Zebulon B. Vance Birthplace is a historic site located in Weaverville, Buncombe County, North Carolina, United States. The site is owned and operated by the North Carolina Division of State Historic Sites.

The site is located in the Reems Creek Valley, and was originally a mountain plantation that was owned by David Vance II and Mira Margaret Baird Vance. The historic site explores daily life in the early 1800s in the Blue Ridge Mountains. Visitors can see the historic structures, including a loom house, tool shed, spring house, smoke house, and corn crib. Guided tours show visitors a 1790 slave house and discuss the eighteen enslaved people that lived and worked on the Vance farm. Tours conclude at the reconstructed 1790s Vance home.

Zebulon Baird Vance was born on the property in 1830, and went on to be Governor of North Carolina (1877–1879) and U.S. Senator (1879–1894).

The farm features an exhibit about Vance's career, and how this early mountain life influenced him.
