= Weaverville, North Carolina =

- Town
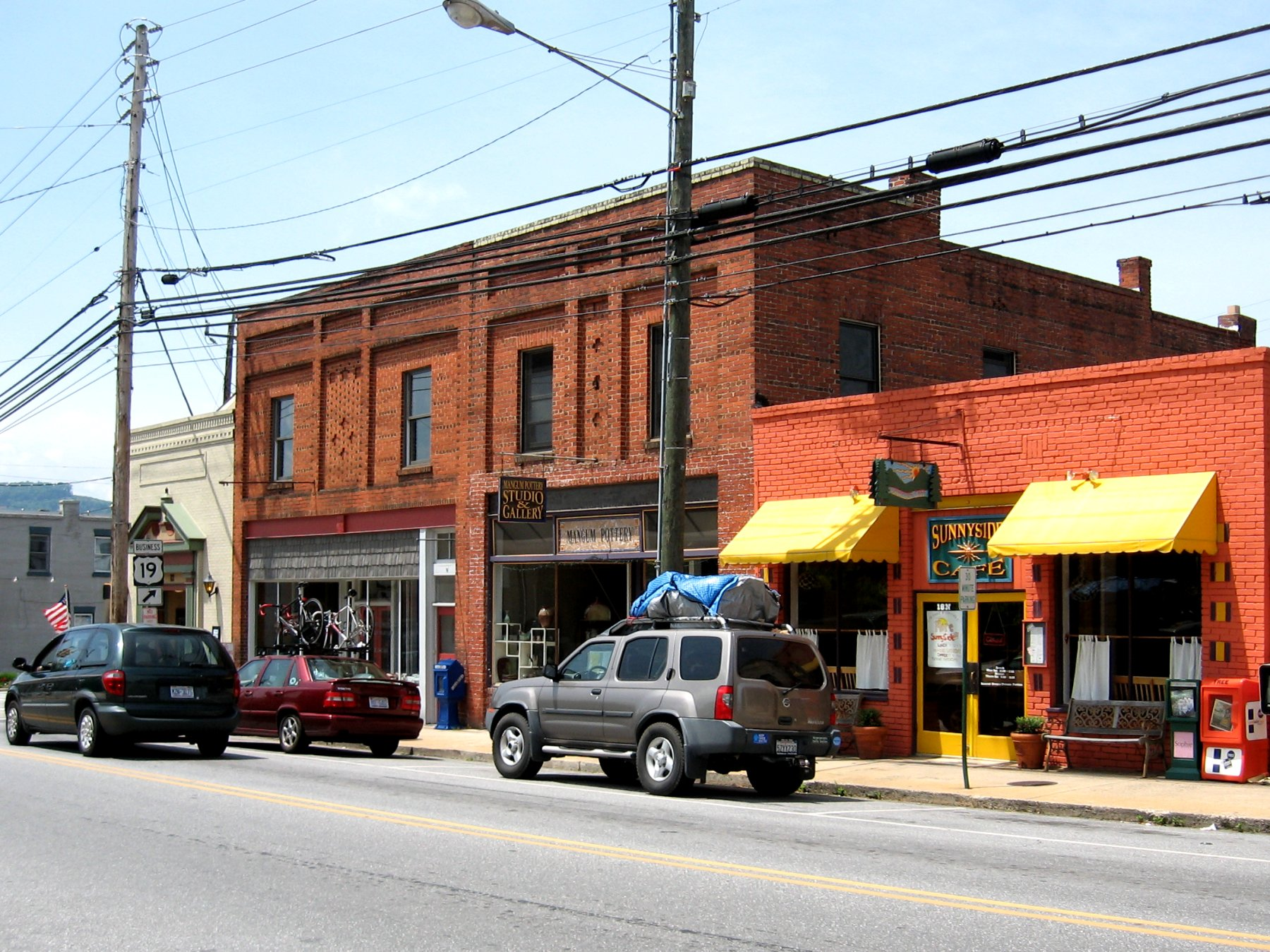
- Main Street in Weaverville (2009)

- Seal

- Location in Buncombe County and the state of North Carolina
- Coordinates: 35°41′47″N 82°33′32″W
- Country: United States
- State: North Carolina
- County: Buncombe

Area
  - Total: 3.89 sq mi (10.07 km^{2})
  - Land: 3.88 sq mi (10.05 km^{2})
  - Water: 0.0077 sq mi (0.02 km^{2})
- Elevation: 2,146 ft (654 m)

Population (2020)
  - Total: 4,567
  - Density: 1,177.4/sq mi (454.58/km^{2})
- Time zone: UTC-5 (Eastern (EST))
  - Summer (DST): UTC-4 (EDT)
- ZIP code: 28787
- Area code: 828
- FIPS code: 37-71560
- GNIS feature ID: 2406846
- Website: weavervillenc.org

Weaverville is a town in Buncombe County, North Carolina, United States. The population was 4,567 at the 2020 census. It is part of the Asheville metropolitan area.

== History ==
Chartered in 1875 and named for Michael Montraville Weaver who gave the land for the town, Weaverville sits along the Dry Ridge (named by the Native Americans for its relatively arid conditions). The Treaty of Holston signed in 1786 cleared the way for settlers to move into the area. Among the first settlers were John and Elizabeth Weaver, parents of the town's founder. Early residents, friends, and relatives soon began gathering for religious camp meetings near the south end of College Street. On land first known as the Reems Creek Camp Grounds, a large conference house (built in the 1830s) housed the Methodist assembly which became the first school in the area in 1840.

By 1862, 121 families were in the Reems Creek area, many owning more than 1,000 acres (400 ha). Weaverville College, chartered in 1873, attracted many families. The former president's house is now the Dry Ridge Bed and Breakfast. A four-year college, it was downsized in 1912 to junior college status, merging in 1934 with Rutherford and Brevard Colleges to continue in Brevard. In 1912 a public school (grades 1-7) was located at the west end of Church Street. The first full-time public school on Main Street was established in 1921. In 1927 grades 11-12 attended school in the Robinsom-Lotspeich house (now the Inn on Main Street Bed and Breakfast). Weaverville High School, built by the WPA in 1927, opened on the south end of Main Street, but later merged secondary-school operations with four other area schools (Flat Creek, Red Oak, French Broad, and Barnardsville) in 1954 to form North Buncombe High School.

Business and private residences were built along Main Street. Dr. James Americus Reagan was the first mayor, and with a town council Weaverville began to develop roads and walkways. A police chief developed law and order. With the arrival of electricity and the arrival of an electric trolley the town prospered. Land development boomed. Post offices, starting in 1860, were located in McClure's log cabin, Vandiver's Store (now Blue Mountain Pizza) and Shope's Furniture. A new post office was completed in 2001 on North Main.

The Fire Department was established in 1912, with the first truck purchased in 1922. A fire station was built in 1958 on Merchants Alley, behind the 12 N. Main Town Hall. It moved into the Reagan Building on S. Main Street and then finally onto Monticello Road.

North Carolina's Civil War governor, Zebulon B. Vance, was born in the nearby Reems Creek community. Reems Creek itself flows through Weaverville adjacent to the town's Lake Louise Park. The mill at Reem's Creek was portrayed in "Picturesque America," a famous 19th century work of illustrated American scenes published in 1872.

The Dr. John G. & Nannie H. Barrett Farm, Brigman-Chambers House, Joseph P. Eller House, Weaverville United Methodist Church, and Zebulon H. Baird House are listed on the National Register of Historic Places.

Weaverville was established in the Reems Creek Valley of northern Buncombe County during the nineteenth century and was incorporated in 1875. The town developed as a regional commercial center serving surrounding agricultural communities and later became a destination for summer visitors because of its mountain climate.

The arrival of the Asheville and Craggy Mountain Railway in the early twentieth century further stimulated economic development and tourism, while local agriculture, commerce, and small industries remained important components of the area's economy.

=== Development ===
Construction began in March 2017 of the 35,000-square-foot ASPCA Behavioral Rehabilitation Center at an old cement plant on Murphy Hill Road. The $9 million project will "likely to be the first-ever facility dedicated strictly to providing behavioral rehabilitation to canine victims of cruelty and neglect in the United States."

Weaverville is located 9 miles (14 km) north of downtown Asheville, and many residents of Weaverville work in that larger city. However, Weaverville has an economy of its own which includes manufacturing.

In 1963, A-B Emblem, one of the world's largest producers of embroidered patches, built a factory in Weaverville. Since that time, A-B Emblem has been among the town's largest employers. In 2013, the company celebrated 50 years of continual operation in Weaverville. The company produces more than 70 million embroidered patches annually.

A branch of Arvato Digital Services, formerly Sonopress - the world's second-largest replicator of CDs and DVDs, used to operate a facility in Weaverville.

The Solstice East residential treatment center for girls is located in Weaverville. Accusations of abuse have been made against the center.

== Geography ==
Interstate 26, concurrent with U.S. Routes 23 and 19, runs along the western edge of the town, with access from exits 18, 19, and 21. I-26 leads south 9 miles (14 km) to downtown Asheville and 51 miles (82 km) north to Johnson City, Tennessee. U.S. Routes 25 and 70 head west from exit 19, leading 52 miles (84 km) to Newport, Tennessee.

According to the United States Census Bureau, the town has a total area of 3.4 square miles (8.9 km^{2}), of which 0.008 square miles (0.02 km^{2}), or 0.24%, is water, including a man-made lake on the southern outskirts of town named Lake Louise.

== Demographics ==
Historical population
Census	Pop.	Note	%±
1880	147		—
1890	216		46.9%
1900	329		52.3%
1910	442		34.3%
1920	606		37.1%
1930	848		39.9%
1940	880		3.8%
1950	1,111		26.3%
1960	1,041		−6.3%
1970	1,280		23.0%
1980	1,495		16.8%
1990	2,107		40.9%
2000	2,416		14.7%
2010	3,120		29.1%
2020	4,567		46.4%
U.S. Decennial Census

=== 2020 census ===
Weaverville racial composition
Race	Number	Percentage
White (non-Hispanic)	4,091	89.58%
Black or African American (non-Hispanic)	90	1.97%
Native American	11	0.24%
Asian	38	0.83%
Pacific Islander	3	0.07%
Other/Mixed	165	3.61%
Hispanic or Latino	169	3.7%

As of the 2020 census, Weaverville had a population of 4,567. The median age was 54.3 years. 15.5% of residents were under the age of 18 and 34.9% of residents were 65 years of age or older. For every 100 females there were 78.3 males, and for every 100 females age 18 and over there were 75.4 males age 18 and over.

100.0% of residents lived in urban areas, while 0.0% lived in rural areas.

There were 2,140 households in Weaverville, of which 20.7% had children under the age of 18 living in them. There were also 1,072 families residing in the town. Of all households, 47.2% were married-couple households, 12.8% were households with a male householder and no spouse or partner present, and 33.7% were households with a female householder and no spouse or partner present. About 32.5% of all households were made up of individuals and 18.3% had someone living alone who was 65 years of age or older.

There were 2,354 housing units, of which 9.1% were vacant. The homeowner vacancy rate was 1.1% and the rental vacancy rate was 8.0%.

=== 2000 census ===
As of the census of 2000, there were 2,416 people, 1,008 households, and 690 families residing in the town. The population density was 954.2 inhabitants per square mile (368.4/km^{2}). There were 1,081 housing units at an average density of 426.9 per square mile (164.8/km^{2}). The racial makeup of the town was 96.69% White, 1.28% African American, 0.25% Native American, 0.50% Asian, 0.41% from other races, and 0.87% from two or more races. Hispanic or Latino of any race were 1.16% of the population.

There were 1,008 households, out of which 25.1% had children under the age of 18 living with them, 56.8% were married couples living together, 9.3% had a female householder with no husband present, and 31.5% were non-families. 28.6% of all households were made up of individuals, and 13.3% had someone living alone who was 65 years of age or older. The average household size was 2.27 and the average family size was 2.76.

In the town, the population was spread out, with 19.1% under the age of 18, 5.5% from 18 to 24, 25.4% from 25 to 44, 26.5% from 45 to 64, and 23.5% who were 65 years of age or older. The median age was 45 years. For every 100 females, there were 83.4 males. For every 100 females age 18 and over, there were 78.9 males.

The median income for a household in the town was $45,110, and the median income for a family was $52,731. Males had a median income of $35,577 versus $24,613 for females. The per capita income for the town was $24,517. About 2.1% of families and 4.4% of the population were below the poverty line, including 2.8% of those under age 18 and 3.9% of those age 65 or over.

== Government ==
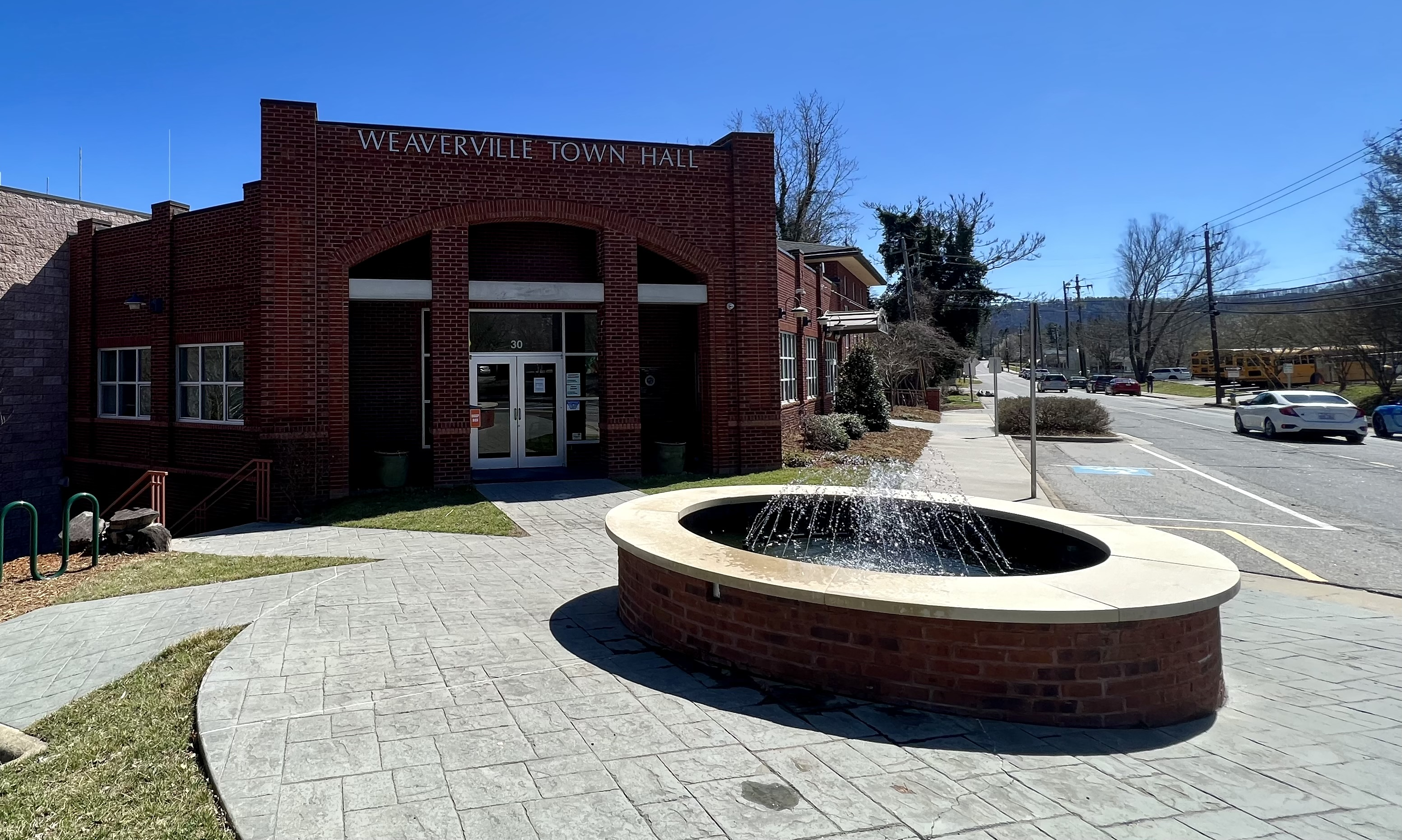
Weaverville Town Hall

The current mayor is Patrick Fitzsimmons, elected in 2021, replacing Al Root. Fitzsimmons served previously on the towns Economic Development Advisory Board.

The Town Council holds its regular monthly meeting on the 3rd Monday of each month at 7:00 PM. Meeting agendas are published to the Town's website by the Wednesday before the meeting.

== Education ==
Public K-12 education in Weaverville is administered by Buncombe County Schools. Kindergarten and first grade students attend Weaverville Primary School, and 2nd through 4th grade students attend Weaverville Elementary School. 5th, 6th, 7th and 8th grade students attend North Windy Ridge Intermediate School and North Buncombe Middle School. At these schools, students from Weaverville are mixed with other students from communities in the wider North Buncombe school district.

High school Weaverville students are assigned to North Buncombe High School, though they also have to option to attend Martin L. Nesbitt Jr. Discovery Academy, Buncombe County Middle College High School, or Community High School.

== Notable people ==
- John E. Sloan, US Army major general, lived in Weaverville during retirement
- Karlyn Pickens, College Softball Athlete
- Rome Chambers (1875-1902), Major League Baseball pitcher

== See also ==
- Hillside, North Carolina
