= David Vance (soldier) =

American soldier during the American Revolutionary War

Member of the North Carolina House of Commons
- In office 1786–1791

Personal details
- Born: c. 1745 Winchester, Virginia
- Died: 1813 (aged 67–68)
- Resting place: Reems Creek
- Spouse: Priscilla Brank (m. 1775)
- Relations: Robert B. Vance (grandson); Zebulon Baird Vance (grandson)
- Children: 3, including Robert
- Relatives: Zebulon Vance (grandson); Robert B. Vance (grandson)

Military service
- Allegiance: United States of America
- Branch/service: United States Army
- Rank: Colonel
- Battles/wars: American Revolutionary War; Musgrove Mill; Kings Mountain; Brandywine; Germantown; Valley Forge

David Vance (c. 1745 – 1813) was an American soldier during the American Revolutionary War.

== Early and family life ==
Vance was born near Winchester, Virginia, circa 1745, the oldest son of Samuel Vance and descended from the DeVaux family in Normandy. The name Vance is a corruption of DeVaux.

Around 1774 he settled on the Catawba River in Rowan County, later Burke County. In 1775, he married Priscilla Brank, daughter of Robert Brank. They had three sons, Samuel, Robert B. and David Jr. His son Robert served in the U.S. House of Representatives. His grandsons were Robert B. Vance and Zebulon Baird Vance.

== Military career ==
Serving in the American Revolutionary War as an American soldier in the North, he was an ensign, and at the battles of Brandywine, Germantown and at Valley Forge. In the South he was at the battles of Musgrove Mill and Kings Mountain.

After the war he settled at Vanceville on Reems Creek, Burke County, which is now Buncombe County. In 1786 and 1791 he was a member from Burke County of the North Carolina House of Commons and in 1791 he and Colonel William Davidson from Rutherford County introduced in that house petitions to create the County of Buncombe.

In 1792 he became and remained the Clerk of the County Court of that new county in whose minutes his beautiful penmanship appears. He, and General Joseph McDowell and Mussendine Matthews as North Carolina commissioners superintended in 1799 the running of the line between North Carolina and Tennessee from the southern border of Virginia southwardly across Big Pigeon River. In consequence of some conversation when engaged in that work he wrote recollections of the Battle of Kings Mountain published many years after his death. He was a colonel of militia.

In 1813 he died and was buried at his farm on Reems Creek.
