= Reems Creek =

Stream in North Carolina, U.S.

Coordinates: 35.6951°N 82.6137°W

Reems Creek is a stream in the U.S. state of North Carolina. It is a tributary to the French Broad River.

According to tradition, the creek derives its name from one Mr. Rims, a pioneer who was killed by Indians near its mouth. Variant names are "Reams Creek", "Reem Creek", "Rheims Creek", and "Rims Creek".
