= Cultural pessimism =

Conviction that culture is in decline

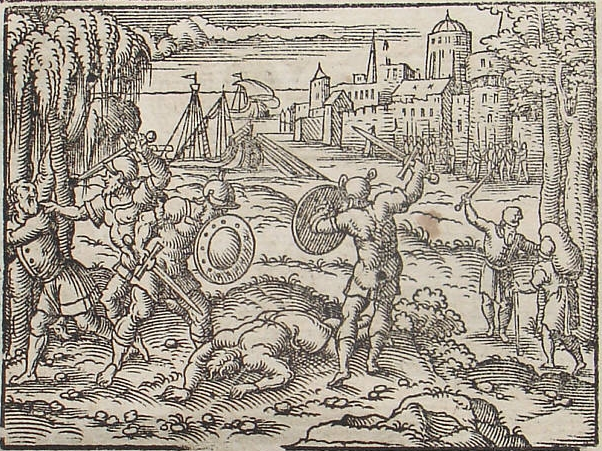
The Iron Age. Engraving by Virgil Solis for Ovid's Metamorphoses, Book I, 141–150.

Cultural pessimism arises with the conviction that the culture of a nation, a civilization, or humanity itself is in a process of irreversible decline. It is a variety of pessimism formulated by a cultural critic.

== History ==
=== Traditional versions ===
It has been significant presence in the general outlook of many historical cultures: things are "going to the dogs", the Golden age is in the past, and the current generation is fit only for dumbing down and cultural careerism. Some significant formulations have gone beyond this, proposing a universally-applicable cyclic model of history—notably in the writings of Giambattista Vico.

=== 19th century ===
The pessimistic element was available in Arthur Schopenhauer's philosophy and Matthew Arnold's cultural criticism. The tide of Whiggish optimism (exemplified by Macaulay) receded somewhat in the middle of the reign of Queen Victoria.

Classical culture, based on traditional classical scholarship in Latin and Greek literature, had itself been under attack externally for two generations or more by 1900, and had produced, in Friedrich Nietzsche, a model pessimistic thinker.

=== 20th century ===
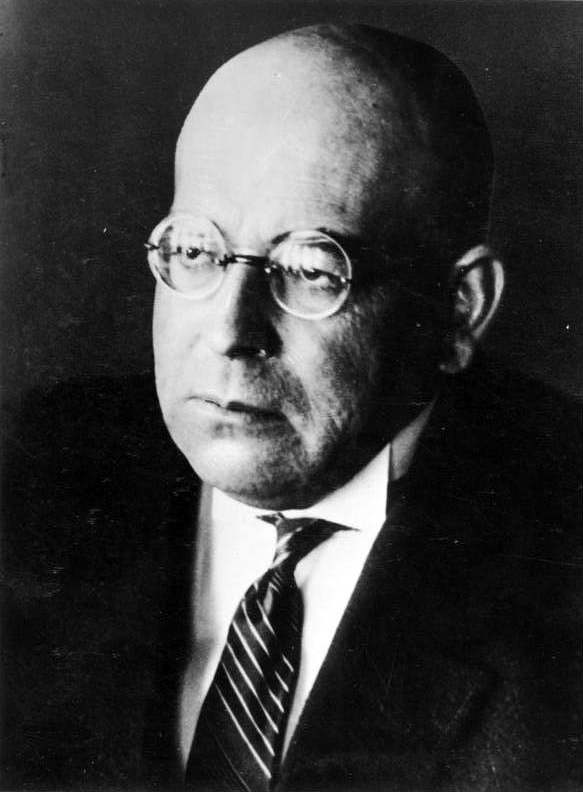
Oswald Spengler, author of The Decline of the West

Cultural pessimism of the Oswald Spengler epoch might be seen as a refusal of the rather intellectual and secular choice between nihilism and modernism. Politically this tended to squeeze liberal thought.

Specific criticism of the West, in the first years of the twentieth century, is usually taken as of the Old World of Europe, excluding therefore North America in particular. The classic source for this is Spengler's The Decline of the West (1918–1923), often cited in the years following its publication. The tone of much of the critical writing, for example, of T. S. Eliot, and the historical writing of Arnold J. Toynbee from the 1920s onwards, is identifiable. It was fashionable to say that Spengler had at least formulated some truths about the cultural situation of Europe after World War I. Eliot's major early work The Waste Land (1922) was commonly and directly interpreted in those terms.

Towards the end of the 20th century, cultural pessimism surfaced in a prominent way. The very title of Jacques Barzun's From Dawn to Decadence: 500 Years of Western Cultural Life, 1500 to the Present (2000) challenges the reader to be hopeful. On Matthew Arnold, a major cultural critic of the Victorian era, Barzun writes:

According to Arnold, the behaviour of the English social classes was touched neither by spiritual nor by intellectual forces; the upper orders were barbarians, the middle classes philistines. (op. cit. p.573)

The end of the millennium saw in the United States concerns rather specific to the conservative view on the culture wars and university education. Western Europe, on the other hand, struggled towards self-definition in the face of limiting demography, and postmodernism as at least journalistically predominant—the difference primarily lying in the political prominence of the issues.

== See also ==
- Ages of Man
- Philosophical pessimism
- Tragic hero
- We Are Doomed: Reclaiming Conservative Pessimism
- Richard M. Weaver
  - Ideas Have Consequences

== Bibliography ==
- Bennett, Oliver (2001). Cultural Pessimism: Narratives of Decline in the Postmodern World. Edinburgh: Edinburgh University Press. ISBN 9780748609369.
- Schmitt, Mark (2023). Spectres of Pessimism: A Cultural Logic of the Worst. Basingstoke: Palgrave.
