= John Hackworth =

American soccer coach (born 1970)

Personal information
- Full name: John Christopher Hackworth
- Date of birth: February 5, 1970 (age 56)
- Place of birth: Dunedin, Florida, United States
- Position: Defender

College career
Years	Team	Apps	(Gls)
1989–1990	Brevard Tornados		
1991–1992	Wake Forest Demon Deacons		

Senior career*
Years	Team	Apps	(Gls)
1992–1994	Carolina Crunch		
1997	Carolina Dynamo	1	(0)

Managerial career
- 1994: Wake Forest Demon Deacons (women's assistant)
- 1994–1997: Wake Forest Demon Deacons (men's assistant)
- 1998–2001: South Florida Bulls
- 2002–2004: United States U17 (assistant)
- 2004–2007: United States U17
- 2007–2009: United States (assistant)
- 2010–2012: Philadelphia Union (assistant)
- 2012–2014: Philadelphia Union
- 2015–2018: United States U17
- 2017–2018: United States (assistant)
- 2018–2021: Louisville City
- 2022: St. Louis City 2 (interim)
- 2023–2024: St. Louis City (assistant)
- 2024: St. Louis City (interim)
- 2025: St. Louis City 2 (interim)
- 2026–: Navy Midshipmen
- * Club domestic league appearances and goals

John Hackworth (born February 5, 1970, in Dunedin, Florida) is an American soccer coach who is currently the head coach for the Navy Midshipmen.

== Player ==
Hackworth graduated from Dunedin High School in his Florida hometown. He began his collegiate soccer career at Brevard College in 1988 and 1989. In 1990, he transferred to Wake Forest University where he redshirted and played in 1991 and 1992.

Hackworth then played several years in the United States Development Soccer League. In 1997, his amateur team, La Correta, played against the Carolina Dynamo of the A-League in a game where Hackworth shut down the Trinidad & Tobago international Stern John. As a result, the Dynamo signed him for the rest of the season. Hackworth spent most of the season as a reserve, but played one game as the Dynamo finished runner-up in the championship.

== Coach ==
=== Wake Forest & South Florida ===
By the time Hackworth retired from playing in 1997, he had already spent several years coaching. In 1993, Wake Forest University hired Hackworth as an assistant coach with the women's soccer team. In 1994, he became an assistant with the men's team. In 1998, the University of South Florida hired Hackworth as head coach. During his four-year tenure, he took the team to two NCCA tournament appearances and compiled a 47–32–2 record. In 2002, Hackworth became an assistant to United States U-17 men's national soccer team coach John Ellinger.

=== United States U-17 National Team ===
In 2004, when Ellinger left to become head coach at Real Salt Lake, USMNT head coach Bruce Arena appointed Hackworth to become the U-17 head coach. He coached the team at the FIFA U-17 World Cup in 2005 and 2007. In the 2005 U-17 World Cup in Peru, Hackworth and the United States topped their group but lost to the Netherlands in the quarterfinals. In 2007, they finished second in their group but fell to the eventual third-place finisher, Germany, in the Round of 16.

Following the 2007 U-17 World Cup, Hackworth joined Bob Bradley’s coaching staff as an assistant with the senior United States Men's National Team. During his time with the National Team, he also served as the technical director of the U.S. Development Academy.

=== Assistant with USMNT ===
As an assistant coach, Hackworth and the United States Men's National Team finished second in the 2009 Confederations Cup, including a 2–0 victory over Spain in the semifinal, breaking the Spaniards' 35-game unbeaten streak and 15-game winning streak. Hackworth was also with the National Team as it qualified for the 2010 World Cup in South Africa in October 2009.

=== Philadelphia Union ===
On November 9, 2009, Hackworth joined former U.S. Soccer colleague Piotr Nowak with the MLS expansion side Philadelphia Union as a coach and youth development coordinator. With that, Hackworth forwent going to the 2010 World Cup with the USMNT.

On June 13, 2012, Hackworth was announced as the Philadelphia Union's new interim coach. The club subsequently advanced to the 2012 U.S. Open Cup semifinals. Hackworth was given the title permanently on Aug. 30.

In his first full season in charge of the Union, the squad ranked as high as second in the Eastern Conference the week of June 24 but failed to reach the playoffs by three points. On June 10, 2014, he was relieved of his duties as team manager.

=== Return to U.S. Soccer ===
Following his time with the Union, Hackworth was hired to be the United States U-15 head coach. Jürgen Klinsmann appointed Hackworth as an assistant to Andy Herzog for the U.S. Olympic Team.

In December 2015, Hackworth was re-hired as U-17 National Team coach ahead of the 2017 FIFA U-17 World Cup in India and also oversaw the U.S. U-17 Residency Program. The United States advanced to the knockout round, where they defeated Paraguay by a 5–0 score. They lost in the quarterfinals to the eventual tournament champions, England. At that tournament, he coached notable United States internationals Sergiño Dest, Josh Sargent, and Timothy Weah.

From December 2017 through August 2018, Hackworth returned as an assistant coach with the senior national team.

=== Louisville City FC ===
On August 2, 2018, Hackworth officially signed on as head coach for Louisville City FC. As the head coach, he led the team to a USL Championship title in 2018, guided them back to the final in 2019 and in 2020 saw LouCity post the Eastern Conference's best regular-season record.

On April 27, 2021, it was announced that Hackworth and Louisville City had mutually terminated his contract and replaced by Danny Cruz. This came just three days after Louisville opened their 2021 season with a win over Atlanta United 2.

=== St. Louis City SC ===
In October 2021, Hackworth was named director of coaching for Major League Soccer expansion club St. Louis City SC.

On January 14, 2022, it was announced that Hackworth would serve as interim head coach for the club's MLS Next Pro side for its inaugural 2022 season. In 2023, Hackworth returned to his role as Director of Coaching for the MLS side's inaugural season, replaced as head coach of City 2 by Bobby Murphy.

On July 1, 2024, Hackworth was named the interim head coach for St. Louis City SC after the club let go of head coach Bradley Carnell. Hackworth served in the role until the club named Olof Mellberg permanent head coach on November 26, 2024, at which point Hackworth returned to his role as technical director for the club. Upon Mellberg's firing on May 28, 2025, St. Louis City 2 head coach David Critchley was named interim head coach for the MLS club while Hackworth returned to City 2 as the club's interim coach.

=== Naval Academy ===
On December 5, 2025, Hackworth was named the head coach for the Navy Midshipmen men's soccer team, becoming just the seventh head coach in the 105-year history of the program.

== Honors & Awards ==
While coaching at the University of South Florida, Hackworth was the chairman of the Conference USA's men's soccer committee. In 2000 he was a member of the NCAA selection committee.

In 2008, Hackworth was recognized as the U.S. Soccer Committee Developmental Coach of the Year for soccer.

== Managerial statistics ==
=== Manager ===
As of June 28, 2025

Team	From	To	Record				
Team	From	To	G	W	L	D	Win %
South Florida Bulls	1998	2001	81	47	32	2	58.02
Philadelphia Union	2012	2014	57	20	23	14	35.09
United States U-17	2004	2018*	26	16	7	3	61.54
Louisville City FC	2018	2021	78	48	16	14	61.54
St. Louis City 2	2022	2022	28	17	8	3	60.71
St. Louis City SC (interim)	2024	2024	18	7	7	4	38.89
St. Louis City 2 (interim)	2025	2025	4	4	0	0	100
Total			285	155	94	36	54.39

*U.S. U-17 head coach includes Concacaf World Cup qualifying and U-17 World Cup for two stints, from 2004–2007 and 2015–2018

== Honors ==
=== Manager ===
Louisville City FC

- USL Cup (1): 2018

St. Louis City 2

- MLS Next Pro Western Conference
  - Winners (regular season): 2022
  - Winners (playoffs): 2022
- Western Conference Frontier Division
  - Winners: 2022

=== Individual ===
- USL Coach of the Month: September/October 2020

== Personal ==
Hackworth is the father of three boys. Two of his children play soccer professionally. His son, Morgan Hackworth, started his career as a professional player in 2019 and Larsen Hackworth started his career in 2023 at St. Louis City 2. His son Keaton Hackworth is an admissions counselor at Washington University in St. Louis.

He is an avid cyclist and has been participating in bike races since the late 1980s. After moving to St. Louis, Hackworth joined the local cycling team “Kewlbeanz Cycling”. His most notable result on the team so far is 4th place at the Carondelicious Criterium (Masters 50+). His wife, Tricia Hackworth, supports him in his racing efforts by handing him nutrition during endurance races.
