= John Weaver =

John Weaver may refer to:

- John Weaver (artist) (1920–2012), American sculptor and curator
- John Weaver (Bridgnorth MP) (1675–1747), British lawyer and politician
- John Weaver (dancer) (1673–1760), English dancer and choreographer
- J. R. H. Weaver (1882–1965), historian, President of Trinity College, Oxford
- John Weaver (mayor) (1861–1928), mayor of Philadelphia
- John Weaver (Kentucky politician) (1946–1989), Kentucky politician
- John Weaver (political consultant) (born 1959), American political consultant
- John Weaver (Stamford MP) (died 1685), English politician
- John B. Weaver (born 1974), Dean of Library, Abilene Christian University
- John C. Weaver (historian), Canadian historian
- John Carrier Weaver (1915–1995), American professor and administrator
- John Ernst Weaver (1884–1966), American botanist
- John H. Weaver, American physicist
- John Van Alstyne Weaver (1893–1938), American poet, novelist and screenwriter
- Johnny Weaver (1935–2008), professional wrestler and wrestling commentator
- John Weaver (writer), American writer, storyteller, politician, and postmaster from Tennessee

== See also ==
- Jack Weaver (1928–2009), Los Angeles County Deputy Sheriff
- John Weever (1567–1632), English antiquary and poet
- Jonathan Weaver (disambiguation)
