= List of Philadelphia Union managers =

List of managers of the Philadelphia Union

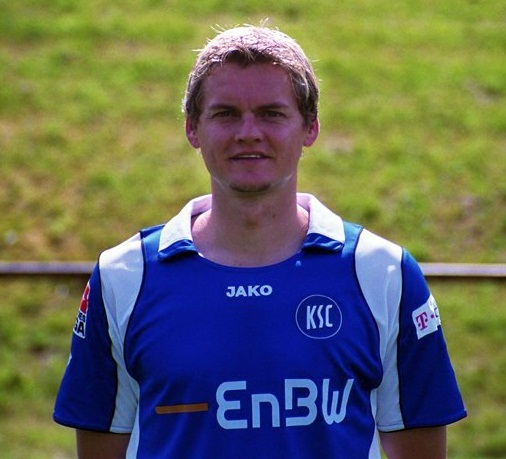
Bradley Carnell (pictured in 2007) was the most recent permanent manager of the Union

The Philadelphia Union is a soccer team based in Chester, Pennsylvania, that competes in Major League Soccer (MLS), the first-division league in the United States. The club began play in 2009 as an expansion team. The Union have had three permanent managers. Their current manager is interim Ryan Richter, who took over after Bradley Carnell was fired.

Curtin is the longest-serving manager of the Union, having been in charge for 358 league and playoff matches between June 2014 and November 2024. During his tenure, the club won its first Supporters' Shield in 2020. It also finished as runners up in the 2014, 2015, and 2018 U.S. Open Cup, as well as the 2022 MLS Cup.

== Managerial history ==
=== Turbulence under early managers (2009-2014) ===
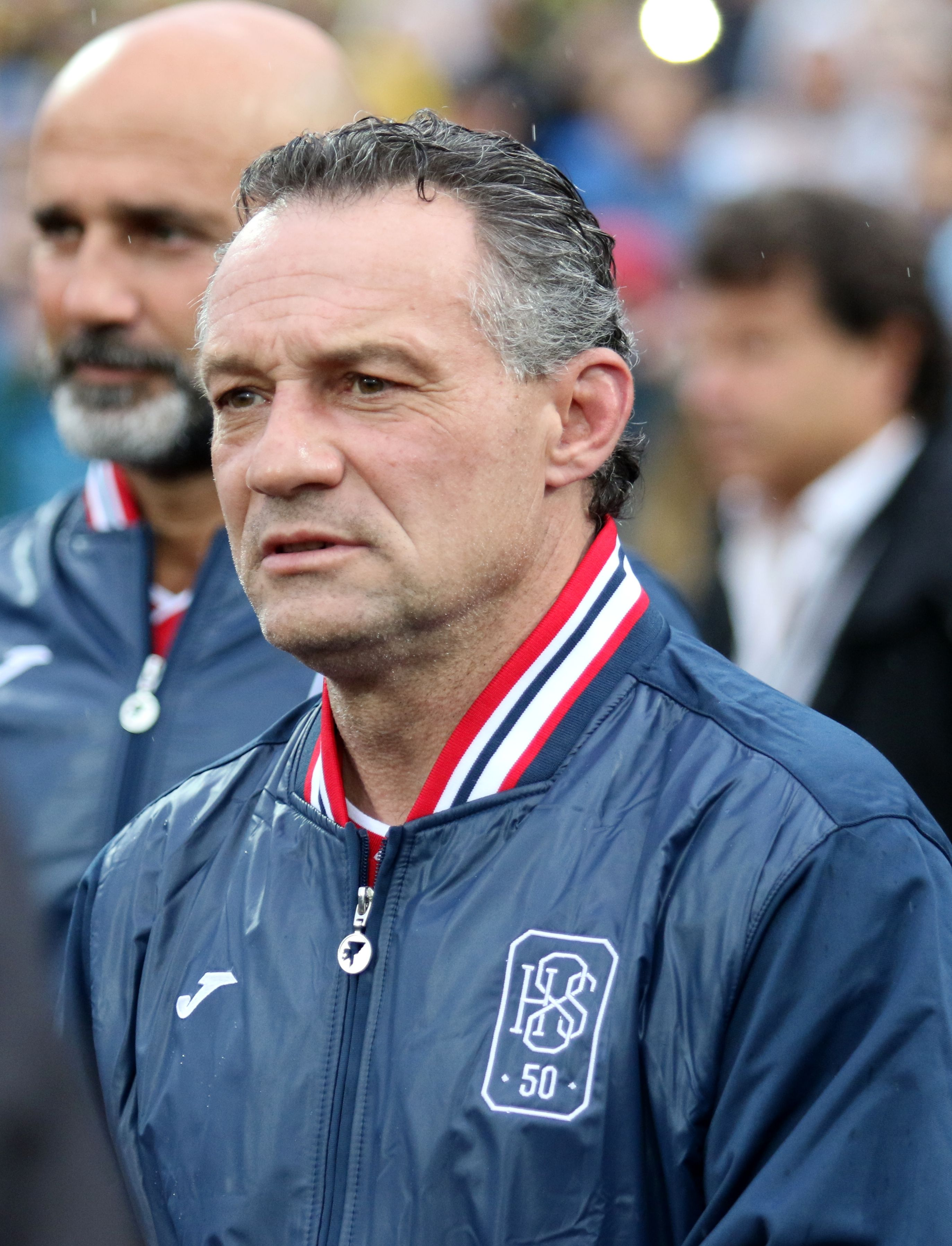
Peter Nowak was the first coach of the Union from 2009 to 2012.

The Philadelphia Union announced Peter Nowak to be their first head coach on May 29, 2009. He had previously been the coach of D.C. United, and resign heed his job as the senior assistant of the United States men's national soccer team to join the Union. The team began play in 2010, and Nowak led them to a 21–29–24 record across their first two and a half seasons, including a playoffs appearance in 2011. In 2012, the team started with a 2–7–2 record, and Nowak was fired on June 13. The next month, Nowak sued the Union for around $1 million for wrongful termination. This lawsuit was dismissed, and in June 2014, Nowak sued Major League Soccer and the MLS Players Union for "tortuous interference", relating to a league investigation into his training practices. This included allegations that Nowak had required players to train through injury and had denied them access to water in 80 degree weather. In 2016, new filings revealed that Nowak had spanked players, including with a sandal. The lawsuit was dismissed and Nowak was ordered to pay $400,000 in legal fees.

After Nowak's firing, John Hackworth was appointed as the interim manager. Hackworth was appointed as permanent manager on August 30 after leading the team to a 5–6–2 record. Hackworth couldn't lead the team to a playoff berth, and was eventually fired on June 10, 2014.

=== Jim Curtin era (2014-2024) ===
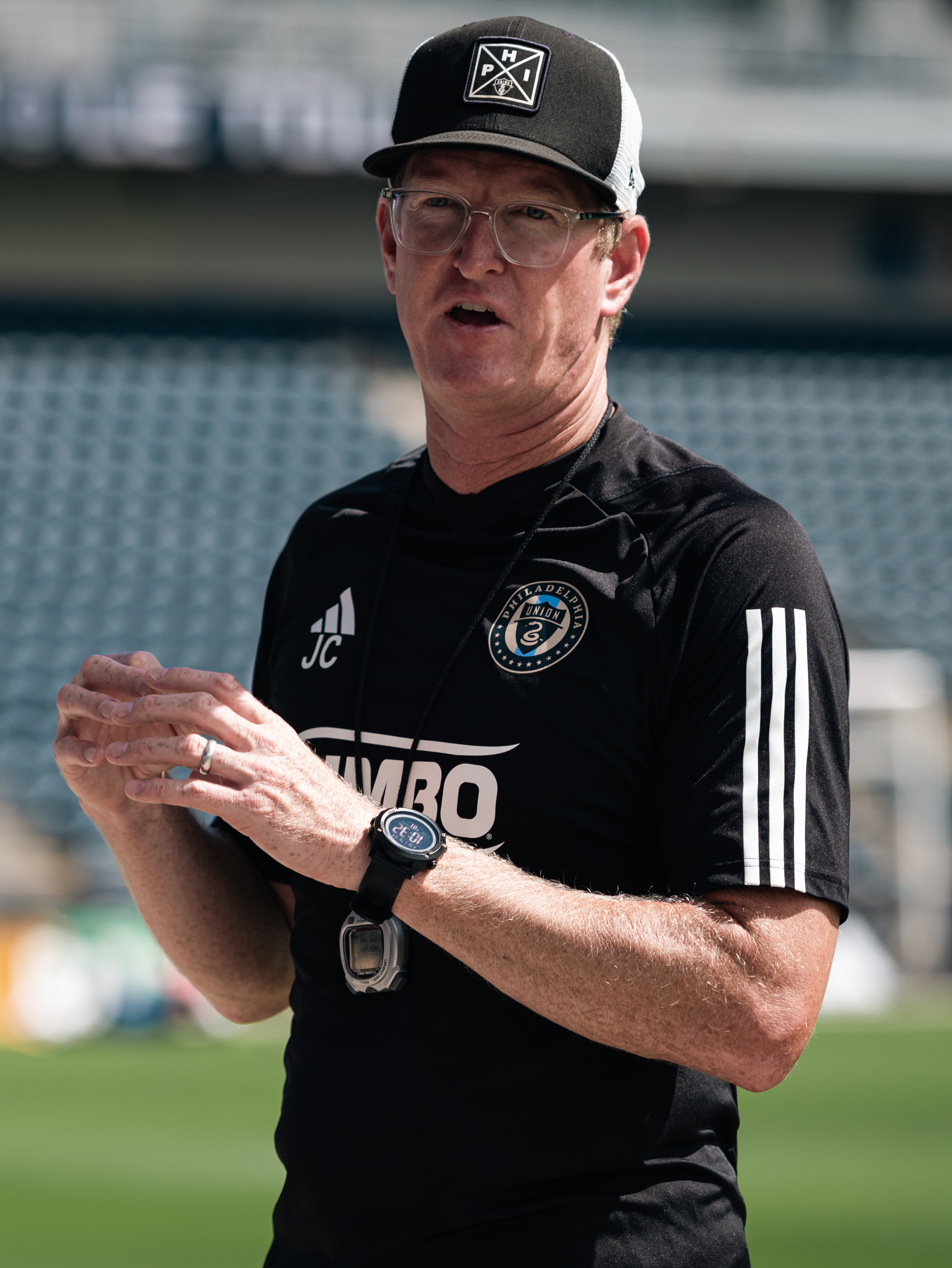
Jim Curtin managed the Union from 2014 to 2024.

Assistant coach Jim Curtin took over for Hackworth after his firing. Curtin led the team to the 2014 U.S. Open Cup final in his first season, and was announced as the permanent head coach on November 7. The next season, the team reached the U.S. Open Cup final again, losing to Sporting Kansas City on penalties. The club once again reached the U.S. Open Cup final in 2018, losing to the Houston Dynamo. The club lifted its first Supporters' Shield in 2020, and Curtin was awarded Sigi Schmid Coach of the Year Award. In 2022, the club narrowly missed out on both the Supporters' Shield and the MLS Cup to LAFC, who won the former on tie-breaker and the latter in a penalty shootout. Curtin was again awarded Coach of the Year this season. On November 7, 2024, the Union fired Curtin after the team missed playoffs for the first time since 2017. The club didn't name an interim manager.

== List of managers ==
Information correct as of May 30, 2025

Key

- Names of caretaker managers are highlighted in italics and marked with an asterisk (*).

Match results contain all league games as well as MLS playoff matches.

List of Philadelphia Union managers
Name	Nationality	From	To	Matches	Won	Lost	Drawn	Win%	Honors
Peter Nowak	Poland	May 29, 2009	June 13, 2012	77	21	32	24	27.27	
John Hackworth	United States	June 13, 2012 (Note: On June 13, 2012, Hackworth was appointed as interim manager. On August 30, he was announced as the full-time manager.)	June 10, 2014	73	23	30	20	31.51	
Jim Curtin	United States	June 10, 2014 (Note: On June 10, Curtin was appointed as interim manager. On November 7, he was announced as the full-time manager.)	November 7, 2024	358	145	121	92	40.50	Supporters' Shield winners: 2020 MLS Cup runners up: 2022 U.S. Open Cup runners up: 2014, 2015, 2018
Bradley Carnell	South Africa	January 2, 2025	May 27, 2026	49	21	10	18	42.86	Supporters' Shield winners: 2025
Ryan Richter *	United States	May 27, 2026		0	0	0	0	—	
