= Peter Coclanis =

American historian (born 1952)

- Born: April 22, 1952 (age 74)
- Occupation: Historian

Academic background
- Education: Drake University (BA 1973); Columbia University (MA 1974, MPhil 1976, PhD 1984)
- Thesis: The Shadow of a Dream: Economic Life and Death in the South Carolina Low Country, 1670–1920 (1984)

Academic work
- Discipline: Historian
- Sub-discipline: Economic history; Agricultural history; History of the Southern United States; Atlantic history; History of Southeast Asia
- Institutions: University of North Carolina at Chapel Hill (1984–2026)

Peter A. Coclanis (born April 22, 1952) is an American historian, currently the Albert Ray Newsome Distinguished Professor at University of North Carolina at Chapel Hill. His primary subjects have included the history of economic development, business history, and agricultural history, and he has studied regions such as the American South, the Atlantic World, and Southeast Asia.

== Early life and education ==
Coclanis was born on April 22, 1952. He earned a B.A. from Drake University in 1973, then an M.A. (1974), an M. Phil. (1976), and a Ph.D. in history (1984) from Columbia University. He was a fellow of Columbia's Society of Fellows 1983–1984. His doctoral dissertation, The Shadow of a Dream: Economic Life and Death in the South Carolina Low Country, 1670–1920, won Columbia's Society of American Historians' Allan Nevins Prize and was later published as a book in 1989.

== Career ==
Coclanis joined the University of North Carolina at Chapel Hill (UNC) in 1984, where he rose to the named chair of Albert Ray Newsome Distinguished Professor. His primary subjects have included economic development, business history, and agricultural history, and he has studied regions such as the American South, the Atlantic World, and Southeast Asia. He planned to retire emeritus in the summer of 2026.

He traveled to Singapore as a Fulbright Scholar in the 1990s, helped launch UNC's study abroad programs in Southeast Asia, served as associate provost for international affairs 2003–2009, founded and directed UNC's Global Research Institute, and served as Raffles Distinguished Professor in Southeast Asian History at the National University of Singapore in 2005.

Coclanis was president of the Agricultural History Society 1997–1998, became a fellow of the society in 2016, and received its 2019 Gladys L. Baker Award for lifetime achievement. His 2005 article "Global Perspectives on the Early Economic History of South Carolina" was awarded the Clark-Weir Award of the South Carolina Historical Society.

He has written for the libertarian Independent Institute as well as the conservative Claremont Review of Books.

== Selected Works ==
=== Books ===
- Coclanis, Peter A. (1989). The Shadow of a Dream: Economic Life and Death in the South Carolina Low Country 1670–1920. Oxford University Press. ISBN 0-19-504420-7.
- Coclanis, Peter A., ed. (2005). The Atlantic Economy during the Seventeenth and Eighteenth Centuries: Organization, Operation, Practice, and Personnel. University of South Carolina Press.
- Bray, R. Francesca; Coclanis, Peter A.; Fields-Black, Edda L.; Schäfer, Dagmar, eds. (2015). Rice: Global Networks and New Histories. Cambridge University Press. ISBN 978-1-107-04439-5.

=== Articles ===
- Coclanis, Peter; Komlos, John (Autumn 1987). "Time in the Paddies: A Comparison of Rice Production in the South-Eastern United States and Lower Burma in the Nineteenth Century". Social Science History. 11 (3): 343–354. doi:10.2307/1171174. JSTOR 1171174.
- Coclanis, Peter; Carlton, David (2001). "The Crisis in Economic History". Challenge. 44 (6): 93–103. JSTOR 40722111.
- Coclanis, Peter A. (2005). "Global Perspectives on the Early Economic History of South Carolina". The South Carolina Historical Magazine. 106 (2/3): 130–146. JSTOR 27570747.
- Coclanis, Peter A. (October 2006). "Atlantic World or Atlantic/World?". The William and Mary Quarterly, Third Series. 63 (4): 725–742. JSTOR 4491578.
