= Weaver family (North Carolina) =

American political family

Weaver
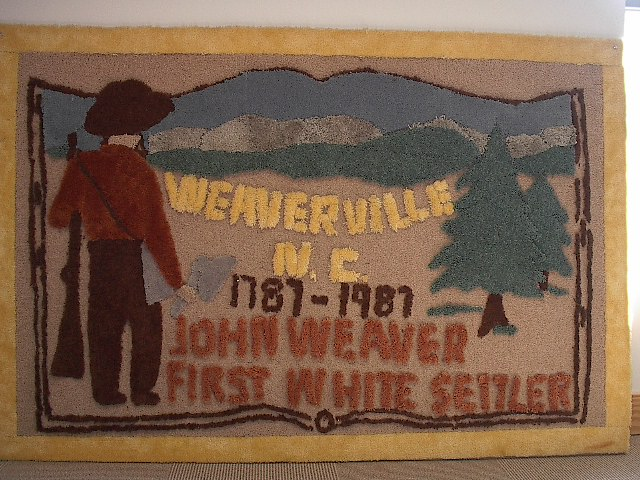
- Country: United States
- Current region: Southern United States

The Weaver family is a locally prominent American pioneer family that founded Weaverville along Reems Creek in Buncombe County, North Carolina and were early settlers of Cocke County, Tennessee.

== Origins ==
According to family lore, the progenitor of the family was an unknown German linen weaver, surnamed Weber, that fled from the Holy Roman Empire to the United Provinces of the Netherlands due to religious persecution, likely because he was a member of the Reformed church. He married a Dutch woman and fathered 3 sons, including John, who later settled in the British colonies. A 1914 book, History of Western North Carolina (From 1730 to 1913), described John Weaver of Reems Creek as:

John Weaver the First. left the information with his children that his father was a Holland gentleman. Other information obtainable indicates that his father came from Holland to Pennsylvania, and in company with other brother and kinsmen of the same name settled near Lancaster, Pennsylvania, later migrating across Maryland into the valley of the Shenandoah in Virginia.

However, a descendant of the Weaver family in Cocke County, Tennessee recorded in 1950 that the family had come from Germany, with the original immigrant Weaver being a man named John George Weaver (Waber or Wärber). John arrived on the ship "Halifax" in 1752, which departed from Rotterdam, briefly stopped in Cowes, and finally landed in Philadelphia in the British Province of Pennsylvania. He settled in Augusta County, Virginia. One daughter, Mary Weaver, is listed as living in Cocke County, Tennessee with her husband, Benjamin O'Dell. The Weaver family would intermarry with the predominantly Anglo-American, notably Scots-Irish (descendants of Lowland Scots and northern English settlers in Ireland), population of the region. A historical article on the history of Weaverville described the early inhabitants of the settlement as follows:

WEAVERVILLE, BUNCOMBE COUNTY. The greater part of the early settlers of this country was made up of men and women seeking religious liberty. This motive no less prompted the immigrants from Northern Europe than the great body of Scotch-Irish that emigrated to this country from Scotland and Ireland (Northern Ireland). In Pennsylvania and down through the valley of the Shenandoah we find the Dutch of Holland (Pennsylvania Germans) and the Scotch-Irish, living side by side dominated by a single purpose. It is easy to believe that these Dutch people found congenial friends and neighbors in the Scotch-Irish people that were thrown together in the valley of the Shenandoah. They were all dominated by a single purpose, to hew out for themselves and their posterity a civil and ecclesiastic system, free from the domination of king or pope. There is no doubt but that the ancestors of these Dutch people were the loyal supporters of William, Duke of Nassau, called "William the Silent" who broke the power of Catholic Spain over the Netherlands in his defeat of Philip the Second in the latter part of the Sixteenth Century.

Per the Family Tree DNA Weaver DNA Project, the family has the Y-DNA haplogroup J-FTC77280, originating in the Balkans.

Branches of the family exist in Oklahoma, Arkansas, and Texas.

== History ==
=== North Carolina ===
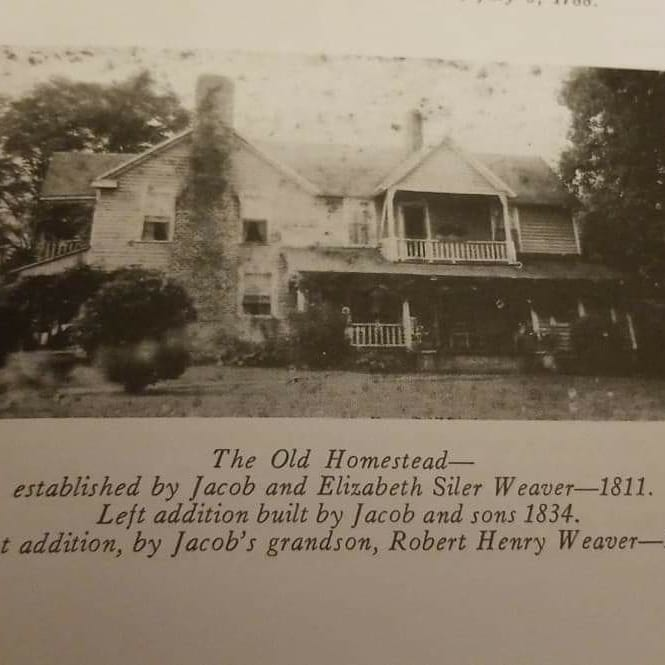
The Old Homestead in Weaverville

John Weaver of Reems Creek (1763-1830) maintained friendly relations with the local Cherokee in the valley and built an Indigenous-style house, before purchasing 320 acres of land to construct a European log cabin as his family's permanent residence. His descendants would found the town of Weaverville.

=== Tennessee ===
John Weaver of Cosby Creek (c.1786-1860), a relative of Reems Creek John, settled in Cocke County in the 1820s, having perhaps formerly lived in Sullivan County, Tennessee. According to his grandson, John Weaver (1869-1954), he was a veteran of the Battle of Horseshoe Bend and New Orleans, serving under Andrew Jackson. The family would heavily intermarry with the Allens, another locally prominent family.

=== Slavery and the Civil War ===
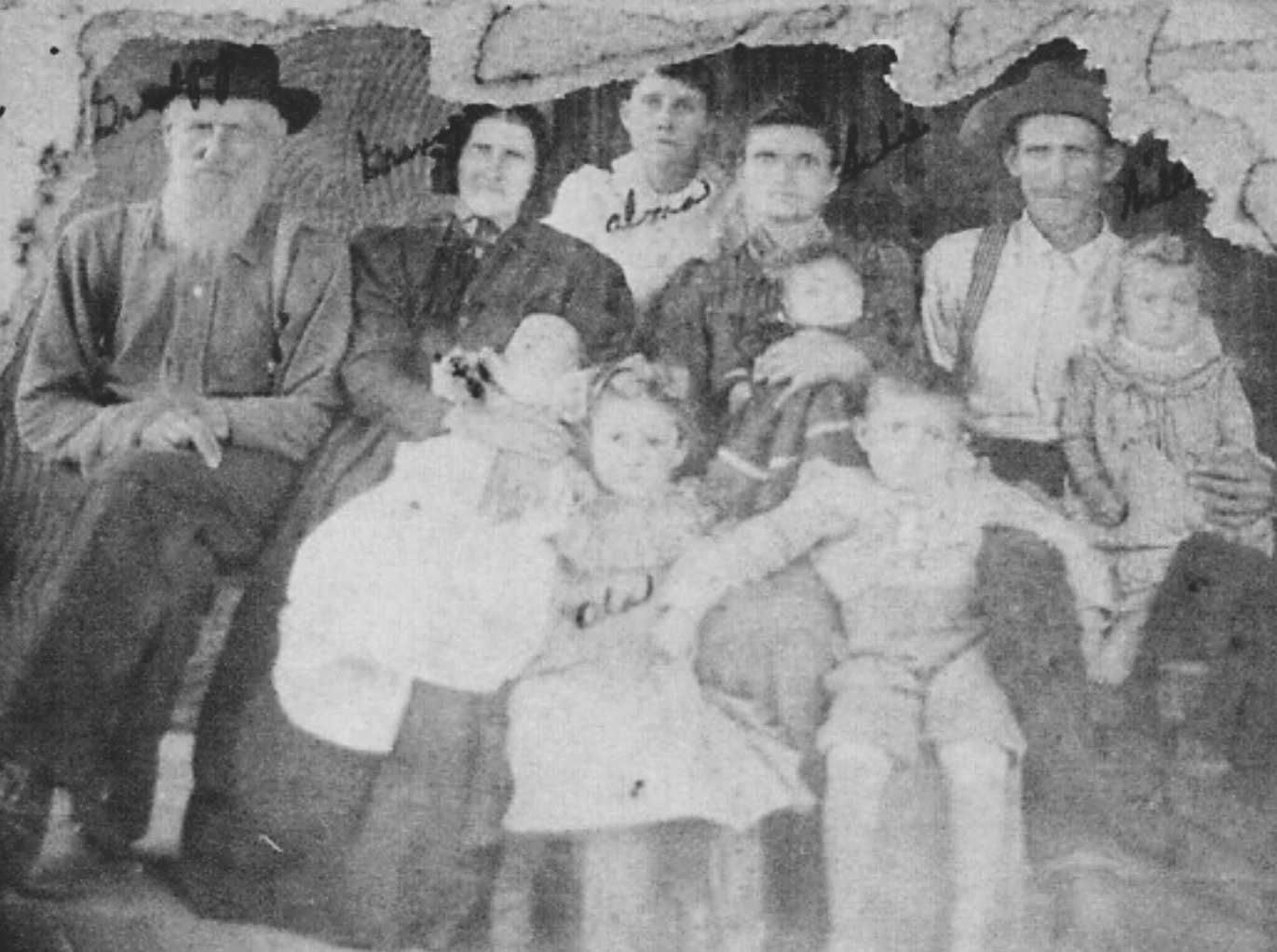
Abraham Weaver (1832-1913), Confederate deserter, with family after the Civil War.

John of Reems Creek's son, Montraville, became a slaveholder. Despite the vast majority of Germans in the Antebellum South not using slaves and many being generally opposed to the practice, there was a minority of German slaveholders located primarily in the Shenandoah Valley and other parts of the region.

As a slaveholding family, many members of the Weaver family fought for the Confederacy during the American Civil War, such as Captain Elbert Weaver (1841–1935), who was Montraville's first son, and Private Abraham Weaver (1832–1913), a cavalryman in Ashby's 2nd Tennessee Cavalry, who deserted in at Tunnel Hill, Georgia after his unit was slaughtered during Wheeler's October 1863 Raid. Abraham was the son of John Weaver of Cocke County, TN.

== Places named for the family ==
=== Weaver College ===
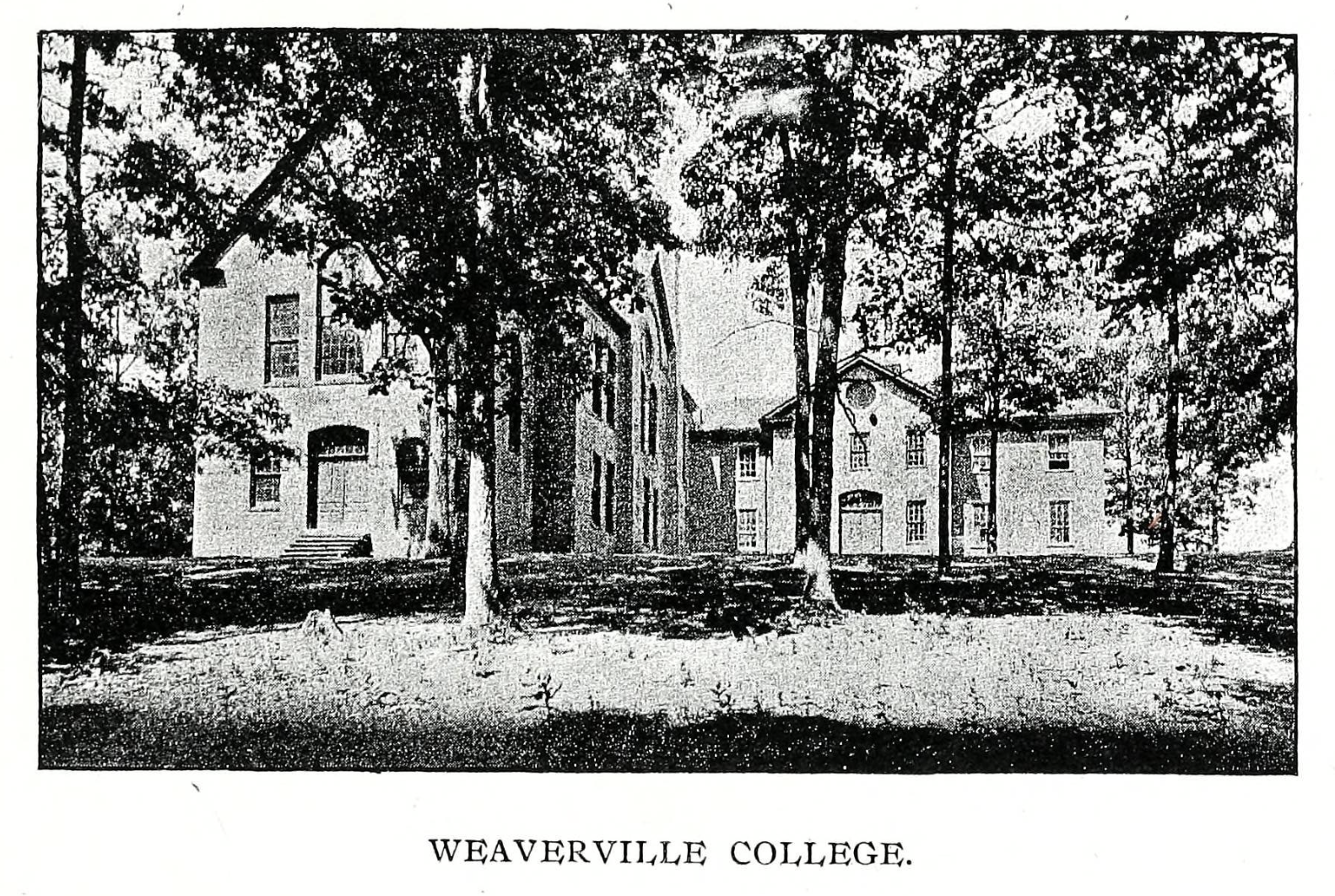
Weaverville College (1898)

Weaver College, founded in 1851 as Weaverville College, was a co-educational Methodist academy located in Weaverville. It was founded on land gifted by the town's founder, Montraville Weaver, and operated from 1873 to 1934 before being merged with Rutherford College to form modern-day Brevard College.

=== Weaver's Bend ===
Bend of the French Broad River in Cocke County, Tennessee.

== Members ==
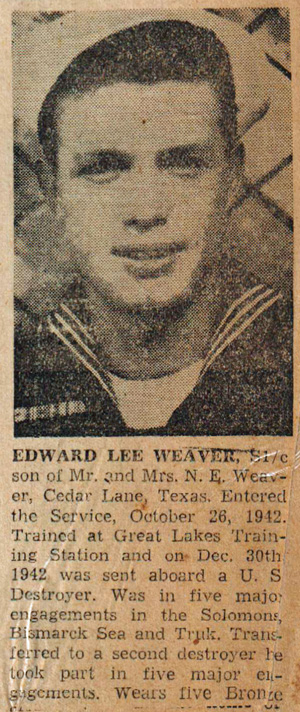
Edward Lee Weaver, member of the Texas branch of the Weaverville Weavers, and a US Navy veteran of the Pacific theater.

- Richard Malcolm Weaver Jr (1910–1963) – University of Chicago professor of English and political philosopher
- Zebulon Weaver (1872–1948) – North Carolina congressman
- William Trotter Weaver (1858–1916) – President of the National Bank of Asheville and businessman who brought electricity to western North Carolina
- Lieutenant Colonel James Thomas Weaver (1828–1864) – Commander of the 60th North Carolina Infantry Regiment killed during the Battle of Murfreesboro
- John Weaver (1869-1954) - Well-known writer, storyteller, and farmer from Cosby, Tennessee
