= James Britt =

James Britt may refer to:

- James Jefferson Britt (1861–1939), American politician
- James Britt (American football) (born 1960), American football cornerback
