= Jonathan Weaver =

Jonathan Weaver may refer to:

- Jonathan Weaver (ice hockey) (born 1977), British professional ice hockey defenceman
- Jonathan Weaver (bishop) (1824–1901), bishop of the Church of the United Brethren in Christ

== See also ==
- John Weaver (disambiguation)
