= Weaver College =

American college (1873–1934)

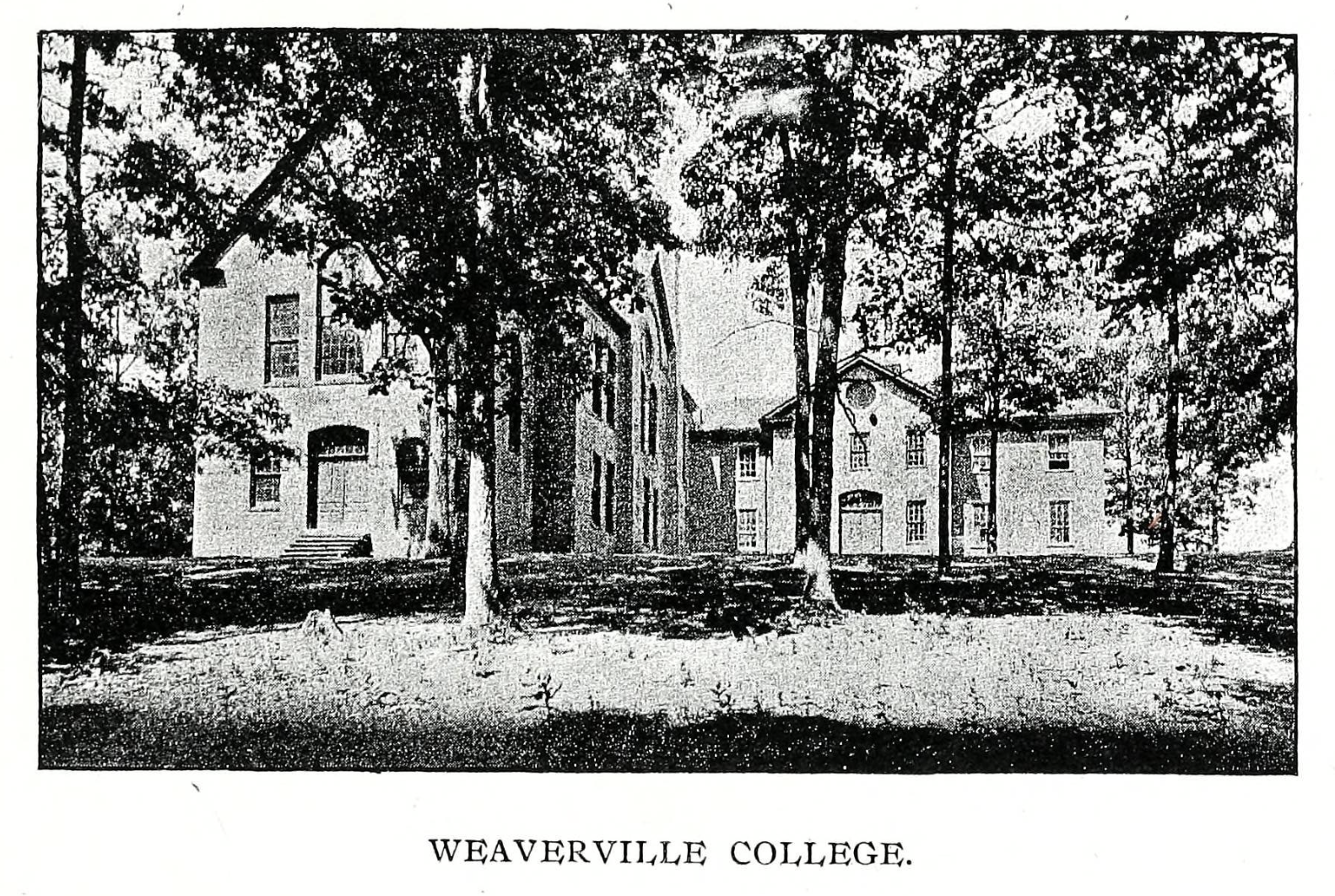
- Former name: Weaverville College (1873–1911)
- Active: 1873–1934
- Affiliation: Brevard College (successor)
- Religious affiliation: Methodist Episcopal Church, South
- Location: Weaverville, North Carolina, United States of America; 35.693533°N 82.562967°W

Weaver College, originally Weaverville College (1873–1934), was an American co-educational school and college in Buncombe County, North Carolina.

== Pre-history ==
It was preceded by Weaverville School, a neighborhood school founded in the c. 1850s and operated by the Sons of Temperance. The school and town, originally named Dry Ridge, were renamed for Montraville Weaver who donated land and money to both.

== History ==
In 1872, the earlier school building burned down, and the towns people decided to build a brick building to serve as a school, for grades 1 through four years of college. Established in 1873, it became a Methodist institution in 1883, property of the Methodist Episcopal Church, South. James Americus Reagan was its first president of Weaverville College, serving from 1872 to 1875. The yearbook was named Mountaineer. Property around Lake Juanita, a man-made spring fed lake, was donated to the school and was renamed Lake Louise to honor Louise Moore, widow of Charles Moore.

The four-year program was reduced to two years as a junior college in 1911 and it was renamed Weaver College. In 1915 the state legislature gave it a new charter.

In 1934 it was merged with the Rutherford Colleges, to form Brevard College in Brevard, North Carolina.

The Weaver Room at Brevard College's library and the Weaver College Bell Tower commemorate its history. In Weaverville, its admission building remains and became a masonic lodge and the White House dormitory remains. It was built on South College Street as the home of the college's president. A historical marker commemorates its history.

== Notable alumni ==
- Walter P. Stacy, chief justice of the North Carolina Supreme Court
- Zebulon Weaver, U.S. congressman
- Hugh Talmage Lefler, professor of history at the University of North Carolina (formerly North Carolina State College of Agriculture and Engineering)
