= Hugh Talmage Lefler =

American historian (1901–1981)

Hugh Talmage Lefler (1901–1981) was an American historian and educator. He is known for his work on the history of North Carolina, some of which is considered pseudohistorical. Lefler taught at the University of North Carolina for many years, and authored a number of books including a history of the university.

== Biography ==
Hugh Talmage Lefler was born on December 8, 1901, in Cooleemee, North Carolina, and grew up on a farm in Davie County. After attending Weaver College, he was graduated from Trinity College, Durham in 1921 with a B.A. degree and in 1922 with a M.A. degree. In 1931, he received a doctorate from the University of Pennsylvania.

Lefler was on the faculty at the North Carolina State College of Agriculture and Engineering (now North Carolina State University) from 1926 to 1935, where he taught history.

His book The Growth of North Carolina was used as the standard state history textbook in North Carolina public schools. His book North Carolina, History of a Southern State was the leading text on the subject. Author Sam Ragan, writing in the North Carolina Historical Review, wrote that Lefler "made history come alive in the classroom and in his books." He held historical views that are typical of the Lost Cause, such as the highly questionable at best view that the American Civil War was not necessarily fought over slavery, writing that "... there were other reasons for the [Civil] war than the question of slavery extension."

He died on April 21, 1981, and is buried at the Old Chapel Hill Cemetery. A historical marker commemorating him and his work is located a mile from his former home. The University of North Carolina's Wilson Library has a collection of his papers.

== Bibliography ==
- North Carolina History Told to Contemporaries (1934)
- Hinton Rowan Helper, Advocate of White America, Historical Publishing, 1935
- The Growth of North Carolina (1940)
- A Plea for Federal Union, University Press of Virginia, 1947, editor
- The Papers of Walter Clark, University of North Carolina Press, 1948, editor
- The United States, Ronald, 1950
- A Documentary History of the University of North Carolina (1953)
- Orange Country, 1752, Orange Printshop, 1953, editor
- North Carolina The History Of A Southern State (1954) with Albert Ray Newsome
- Guide to the Study and Reading of North Carolina History (1955)
- History of North Carolina (1956)
- Travels in the Old South, University of Oklahoma Press, editor (1956)
- Colonial America, with Oscar Theodore Barck Jr., Macmillan, (1958, second edition 1968)
- America, Land of Freedom, Heath, (1959)
- North Carolina (1959)
- A History of the United States, Meridian, (1960)
