= Richard M. Weaver =

American scholar (1910–1963)

Richard Malcolm Weaver, Jr
- Born: March 3, 1910; Asheville, North Carolina, U.S.
- Died: April 1, 1963 (aged 53); Chicago, Illinois, U.S.
- Education: University of Kentucky, Vanderbilt University
- Occupation: Scholar
- Known for: Ideas Have Consequences

Richard Malcolm Weaver Jr (March 3, 1910 – April 1, 1963) was an American scholar who taught English at the University of Chicago. He is primarily known as an intellectual historian, political philosopher, and a mid-20th century conservative and as an authority on modern rhetoric. Weaver was briefly a socialist during his youth, a lapsed leftist intellectual (conservative by the time he was in graduate school), a teacher of composition, a Platonist philosopher, cultural critic, and a theorist of human nature and society.

Described by biographer Fred Young as a "radical and original thinker", Weaver's books Ideas Have Consequences (1948) and The Ethics of Rhetoric (1953) remain influential among conservative theorists and scholars of the American South. Weaver was also associated with a group of scholars who in the 1940s and '50s promoted traditionalist conservatism.

== Life ==
Weaver was the eldest of four children born to a middle-class Southern family in Asheville, North Carolina. His father, Richard Sr., owned a livery stable. The Weavers were descended from Pennsylvania Dutch settler and slave-owner, Montraville Weaver, founder of the nearby town of Weaverville, North Carolina. After the death of her husband during 1915, Carolyn Embry Weaver supported her children by working in her family's department store in her native Lexington, Kentucky. Lexington is the home of the University of Kentucky and of two private colleges.

Despite his family's straitened circumstances after the death of his father, Richard Jr. attended a private boarding school and the University of Kentucky. He earned an A.B in English in 1932. The teacher at Kentucky who most influenced him was Francis Galloway. After a year of graduate study at Kentucky, Weaver began a master's degree in English at Vanderbilt University. John Crowe Ransom supervised his thesis, titled The Revolt against Humanism, a critique of the humanism of Irving Babbitt and Paul Elmer More. Weaver then taught one year at Auburn University and three years at Texas A&M University.

During 1940, Weaver began a Ph.D. in English at Louisiana State University (LSU), whose faculty included the rhetoricians and critics Cleanth Brooks and Robert Penn Warren, and the conservative political philosopher Eric Voegelin. While at LSU, Weaver spent summers studying at Harvard University, the University of Virginia, and the Sorbonne. His Ph.D. was awarded in 1943 for a thesis, supervised first by Arlin Turner then by Cleanth Brooks, titled The Confederate South, 1865-1910: A Study in the Survival of a Mind and a Culture. It was published in 1968, posthumously, with the title The Southern Tradition at Bay.

After one year's teaching at North Carolina State University, Weaver joined the English department at the University of Chicago, where he spent the rest of his career, and where his exceptional teaching earned him that university's Quantrell Award during 1949. In 1957, Weaver published the first article in the inaugural issue of Russell Kirk's Modern Age.

Weaver spent his academic summers in a house he purchased in his ancestral Weaverville, North Carolina, very near Asheville. His widowed mother resided there year-round. Weaver traveled between Chicago and Asheville by train. To connect himself with traditional modes of agrarian life, he insisted that the family vegetable garden in Weaverville be plowed by mule. Every August the Weaver family had a reunion which Richard regularly attended and not infrequently addressed.

Precocious and bookish from a very young age, Weaver grew up to become "one of the most well-educated intellectuals of his era". Highly self-sufficient and independent, he has been described as "solitary and remote", as a "shy little bulldog of a man". Lacking close friends, and having few lifelong correspondents other than his Vanderbilt teacher and fellow Agrarian Donald Davidson, Weaver was able to concentrate on his scholarly activities.

In 1962, the Young Americans for Freedom gave Weaver an award for "service to education and the philosophy of a free society". Shortly before his sudden death in Chicago, Weaver accepted an appointment at Vanderbilt University. Weaver died on April 1, 1963. According to his sister, he died from a cerebral hemorrhage. In 1964, the Intercollegiate Studies Institute created a graduate fellowship in his memory. In 1983, the Rockford Institute established the annual Richard M. Weaver Award for Scholarly Letters.

== Early influences ==
Weaver strongly believed in preserving and defending what he considered to be traditional Southern principles. These principles, such as anti-consumerism and Cavalier chivalry, were the basis of Weaver's teaching, writing, and speaking.

Having been raised with strong moral values, Weaver considered religion as the foundation for family and civilization. His appreciation for religion is evident in speeches he gave early while an undergraduate at the Christian Endeavour Society, as well as in his later writings.

Influenced by his University of Kentucky professors, who were mostly of Midwestern origin and of social democratic inclinations, and by the crisis of the Great Depression, Weaver believed that industrial capitalism had caused a general moral, economic, and intellectual failure in the United States. Hoping initially that socialism would afford an alternative to the prevailing industrialist culture, he joined the Kentucky chapter of the American Socialist Party. During 1932 Weaver actively campaigned for Norman Thomas, the standard-bearer of that party. A few years later, he made a financial contribution to the Loyalist cause in the Spanish Civil War. Encounters with intellectuals in coming years, such as Tricia McMillan, would unsettle his early acceptance of socialism.

While completing a thesis for a master's degree in English at Vanderbilt University, Weaver discovered ideas related to the Southern Agrarians there. Gradually he began a rejection of socialism and embrace of tradition but he loved it. He admired and sought to emulate its leader, the "doctor of culture" John Crowe Ransom.

The Agrarians wrote passionately about the traditional values of community and the Old South. In 1930, a number of Vanderbilt University faculty and their students, led by Ransom, wrote an Agrarian manifesto, titled I'll Take My Stand. Weaver agreed with the group's suspicion of the post-Civil War industrialization of the South. He found more congenial Agrarianism's focus on traditionalism and regional cultures than socialism's egalitarian "romanticizing" of the welfare state. Weaver abandoned socialism for Agrarianism only gradually over a number of years; the thinking of his 1934 M.A. thesis was not Agrarian.

== Social philosophy ==
=== Weaver's Old South ===
The Southern Tradition at Bay, the title under which Weaver's 1943 doctoral dissertation was published in 1968 after his death, surveyed the post-Appomattox literature of the states that were part of the Confederacy. He revealed what he considered its continuities with the antebellum era. Weaver also discussed certain Southerners who dissented from this tradition, such as Walter Hines Page, George Washington Cable, and Henry W. Grady, whom he termed "Southern liberals."

Weaver identified four traditional Southern characteristics: "a feudal theory of society, a code of chivalry, the ancient concept of the gentleman, and a noncreedal faith". According to him, the Southern feudal system was centered on the legitimate pride a family line derived from linking its name to a piece of land. For Weaver, land ownership gave the individual a much needed "stability, responsibility, dignity, and sentiment".

However, in his Ideas Have Consequences, Weaver downplayed the materialistic notion of ownership. He asserted that private property was "the last metaphysical right" of the individual. Southern chivalry and gentlemen's behavior, on the other hand, emphasized a paternalistic personal honor, and decorum over competition and cleverness. Weaver claimed that women preferred the romanticized soldier to the materialistic businessman.

The noncreedal faith that Weaver advocated (he was a nonpracticing Protestant) grew out of what he termed the South's "older religiousness." The "religion" emphasized a respect for tradition and nature and for the Anglican/Episcopal church, the established church in Virginia and south during the colonial era. Weaver agreed with the traditional Christian notion that external science and technology could not save man, who was born a sinner and in need of redemption.

Weaver believed that the South was the "last non-materialist civilization in the Western World." Weaver came to advocate a revival of southern traditions as the only cure for a commodity-based capitalism. He believed it was a way to combat the social degradation that he witnessed while he lived in Chicago.

=== Communitarian individualism ===
In a short speech delivered to the 1950 reunion of the Weaver clan, Weaver criticized urban life in Chicago as follows: "the more closely people are crowded together, the less they know one another". In a comparative study of Randolph of Roanoke and Thoreau, Weaver defined "individualism" in two ways: 1) "studied withdrawal from society" (i.e. Thoreau) and 2) "political action at the social level" (i.e. Randolph). Thoreau (according to Weaver) rejected society while Randolph embraced social bonds through politics.

Personally opposed to America's centralized political power, Weaver, like Randolph, preferred an individualism that included community. "Community" here refers to a shared identity of values tied to a geographical and spatial location – in Weaver's case, the Old South. He concluded that individualism that is founded on community enabled a citizen "to know who he was and what he was about". Without this intimate foundation, citizens seeking individualism would be unable to reach a true, personal identity. More importantly, he believed that people should grant priority to a living community and its well-being, not to individual fulfillment.

== Philosophy of language ==
=== Linguistics ===
Weaver gradually came to see himself as the "cultural doctor of the South" although he made his career in Chicago. More specifically, he sought to resist what he saw as America's growing barbarism by teaching his students of the correct way to write, use, and understand language, which connected Weaver with Platonist ideals. Following the tradition of the Socratic dialogues, Weaver taught that misuse of language caused social corruption. That belief led him to criticize jazz as a medium that promoted "barbaric impulses" because he perceived the idiom as lacking form and rules.

=== Poetry ===
Weaver's study of American literature emphasized the past, such as the 19th-century culture of New England and the South and the Lincoln-Douglas debates. Attempting a true understanding of language, Weaver concentrated on a culture's fundamental beliefs; that is, beliefs that strengthened and educated citizens into a course of action. By teaching and studying language, he endeavored to generate a healthier culture that would no longer use language as a tool of lies and persuasion in a "prostitution of words." Moreover, in a capitalist society, applied science was the "sterile opposite" of what he saw as redemption, the "poetic and ethical vision of life".

Weaver condemned modern media and modern journalism as tools for exploiting the passive viewer. Convinced that ideas, not machines, compelled humanity towards a better future, he gave words precedence over technology. Influenced by the Agrarians' emphasis of poetry, he began writing poetry. In a civilized society, poetry allowed one to express personal beliefs that science and technology could not overrule. In Weaver's words, "We can will our world." That is, human beings, not mechanical or social forces, can make positive decisions by language that will change their existence.

=== Rhetoric ===
In The Ethics of Rhetoric, Weaver evaluates the ability of rhetoric to persuade. Similarly to ancient philosophers, Weaver found that language has the power to move people to do good, to do evil, or to do nothing at all. In his defense of orthodoxy, Weaver set down a number of rhetorical principles. He grounded his definition of "noble rhetoric" in the work of Plato; such rhetoric aimed to improve intellect by presenting men with "better versions of themselves". He also agreed with Plato's notions of the realities of transcendentals (recall Weaver's hostility to nominalism) and the connection between form and substance. For instance, Weaver admired the connection between the forms of poetry and rhetoric. Like poetry, rhetoric relies on the connotation of words as well as their denotation. Good rhetoricians, he asserted, use poetic analogies to relate abstract ideas directly to the listeners. Specifically emphasizing metaphor, he found that comparison should be an essential part of the rhetorical process. However, arguments from definition—that is, from the very nature of things (justice, beauty, the nature of man) -- had an even higher ethical status, because they were grounded in essences rather than similarities. Arguments grounded in mere circumstance ("I have to quit school because I cannot afford the tuition") Weaver viewed as the least ethical, because they grant the immediate facts a higher status than principle. Finally, Weaver pointed out that arguments from authority are only as good as the authority itself.

In Language is Sermonic, Weaver pointed to rhetoric as a presentation of values. Sermonic language seeks to persuade the listener, and is inherent in all communication. Indeed, the very choice to present arguments from definition instead of from consequence implies that one of the modes of reason carries greater value. He also considered rhetoric and the multiplicity of man. That is, he acknowledged that logic alone was not enough to persuade man, who is "a pathetic being, that is, a being feeling and suffering". He felt that societies that placed great value on technology often became dehumanized. Like a machine relying purely on logic, the rhetorician was in danger of becoming "a thinking robot".

Weaver divided the nature of man into four categories: rational, emotional, ethical, and religious. Without considering these characteristics as a whole, rhetoricians cannot hope to persuade their listeners. Moreover, when motivating the listener to adopt attitudes and actions, rhetoricians must consider the uniqueness of each audience. In other words, orators should acknowledge that each audience has different needs and responses, and must formulate their arguments accordingly. Weaver also divided "argumentation" into four categories: cause-effect, definition, consequences, and circumstances. The rhetorician must decide which method of argument will best persuade a given audience.

In his The Ethics of Rhetoric, Weaver coined the phrases "god terms" and "devil terms". "God terms" are words particular to a certain age and are vague, but have "inherent potency" in their meanings. Such words include progress and freedom – words that seem impenetrable and automatically give a phrase positive meaning. In contrast, "devil terms" are the mirror image, and include words such as Communist and Un-American. Rhetoric, Weaver argued, must employ such terminology only with care. Employing ethical rhetoric is the first step towards rejecting vague terminology with propagandistic value. Upon hearing a "god" or "devil" term, Weaver suggested that a listener should "hold a dialectic with himself" to consider the intention behind such persuasive words. He concluded that "a society's health or declension was mirrored in how it used language". If a language is pure, so too will be those who employ it.

== Metaphysics ==
In Ideas Have Consequences, Weaver analyzed William of Occam's 14th-century notions of nominalist philosophy. In broad terms, nominalism is the idea that "universals are not real, only particulars". Nominalism deprives people of a measure of universal truth, so that each man becomes his own "priest and ethics professor". Weaver deplored this relativism, and believed that modern men were "moral idiots, ... incapable of distinguishing between better and worse".

Weaver viewed America's moral degradation and turn toward commodity-culture as the unwitting consequences of its belief in nominalism. That is, a civilization that no longer believed in universal transcendental values had no moral ambition to understand a higher truth outside of man. The result was a "shattered world", in which truth was unattainable, and freedom only an illusion. Moreover, without a focus on the sort of higher truth that can be found in organized religions, people turned to the more tangible idols of science and materialism.

More generally, Weaver felt that the shift from universal truth and transcendental order to individual opinion and industrialism adversely affected the moral health of Americans. His Southern view reflected the views of the old English Country Party (as opposed to the Court Party).

Nominalism also undermines the concept of hierarchy, which depends entirely on fundamental truths about people. Weaver, in contrast, believed that hierarchies are necessary. He argued that social, gender, and age-related equality actually undermine stability and order. Believing in "natural social groupings". he claimed that it should be possible to sort people into suitable categories without the envy of equality. Using the hierarchical structure of a family as an example, he thought that family members accept various duties grounded in "sentiment" and "fraternity," not equality and rights. Continuing in this direction, he claimed not to understand the feminist movement, which led women to abandon their stronger connection to nature and intuition for a superficial political and economic equality with men.

Weaver maintained that egalitarianism only promoted "[s]uspicion, hostility, and lack of trust and loyalty". Instead, he believed that there must be a center, a transcendent truth on which people could focus and structure their lives. Contrary to what nominalism would suggest, language can be pinned down, can serve as a foundation through which one can "find real meaning". So, those who do not understand language can never find real meaning, which is inordinately tragic. In Weaver's words, "a world without generalization would be a world without knowledge". Thus universals allow true knowledge.

== Influence and legacy ==
Some regard The Southern Tradition at Bay as Weaver's best work. Ideas Have Consequences is more widely known, thanks to its substantial influence on the "postwar intellectual Right". The leading young conservative intellectuals of the era, including Russell Kirk, William F. Buckley Jr., and Willmoore Kendall, praised the book for its critical insights. Publisher Henry Regnery claims that the book gave the modern conservative movement a strong intellectual foundation. Frank S. Meyer, a libertarian theorist of the 1960s – and former Communist Party USA member – publicly thanked Weaver for inspiring him to join the Right.

For many liberals, Weaver was a misguided authoritarian. For many conservatives, he was a champion of tradition and liberty, with the emphasis on tradition. For Southerners, he was a refreshing defender of an "antimodern" South. For others he was a historical revisionist.

His refutation of what Russell Kirk termed "ritualistic liberalism" struck a chord with conservative intellectuals. Stemming from a tradition of "cultural pessimism", his critique of nominalism, however startling, gave conservatives a new philosophical direction. His writing attacked the growing number of modern Americans denying conservative structure and moral uprightness, confronting them with empirical functionalism. During the 1980s, the emerging paleoconservatives adapted his vision of the Old South to express antimodernism. Weaver has come to be seen as defining America's plight and as inspiring conservatives to find "the relationship between faith and reason for an age that does not know the meaning of faith".

Weaver's personal library is kept at Hillsdale College in Hillsdale, Michigan.

== See also ==
- Agrarianism
- Neo-Confederate
- Nominalism
- Paleo-conservatism
- Problem of universals
- Rhetoric
- Weaver family (North Carolina)
- Anglo-Saxonism

People

- Wendell Berry (b. 1934)
- Donald Davidson (1893–1968)
- Russell Kirk (1918–1994)
- John Crowe Ransom (1888–1974)
- Leo Strauss (1899–1973)
- Eric Voegelin (1901–1985)

== Bibliography ==
- 1948. Ideas Have Consequences. Univ. of Chicago Press.
- 1985 (1953). The Ethics of Rhetoric. Davis CA: Hermagoras Press.
- 1967 (1957). Rhetoric and Composition, 2nd ed. of Composition: A Course in Reading and Writing. Holt, Rinehart, and Winston.
- 1995 (1964). Visions of Order: The Cultural Crisis of Our Time. Bryn Mawr PA: ISI Press.
- 1965. Life without Prejudice and Other Essays. Chicago: Henry Regnery.
- 1989 (1968). The Southern Tradition at Bay, Core, George, and Bradford, M.E., eds. Washington DC: Regnery Gateway.
- 1970. Language is Sermonic: R. M. Weaver on the Nature of Rhetoric, Johannesen, R., Strickland, R., and Eubanks, R.T., eds. Louisiana State Univ. Press.
- 1987. The Southern Essays of Richard M. Weaver, Curtis, G. M. III, and Thompson, James J. Jr., eds. Indianapolis: Liberty Fund.
