= Visions of Order =

1964 book by Richard Weaver

- 1995 edition
- Author: Richard M. Weaver
- Language: English
- Publication date: 1964
- Publication place: United States

Visions of Order (1964) is a posthumously published work by the American conservative scholar Richard M. Weaver. It argues that Western culture is in decline because many of its intellectuals refuse to believe in an underlying order of things—in the way things are, irrespective of beliefs about them.

More specific targets of Weaver's wrath in this book include: the theory of biological evolution, public education, total wars, the immanentizing of social ideals, and an over-emphasis on function over status.
