= Zebulon Weaver =

American politician (1872–1948)

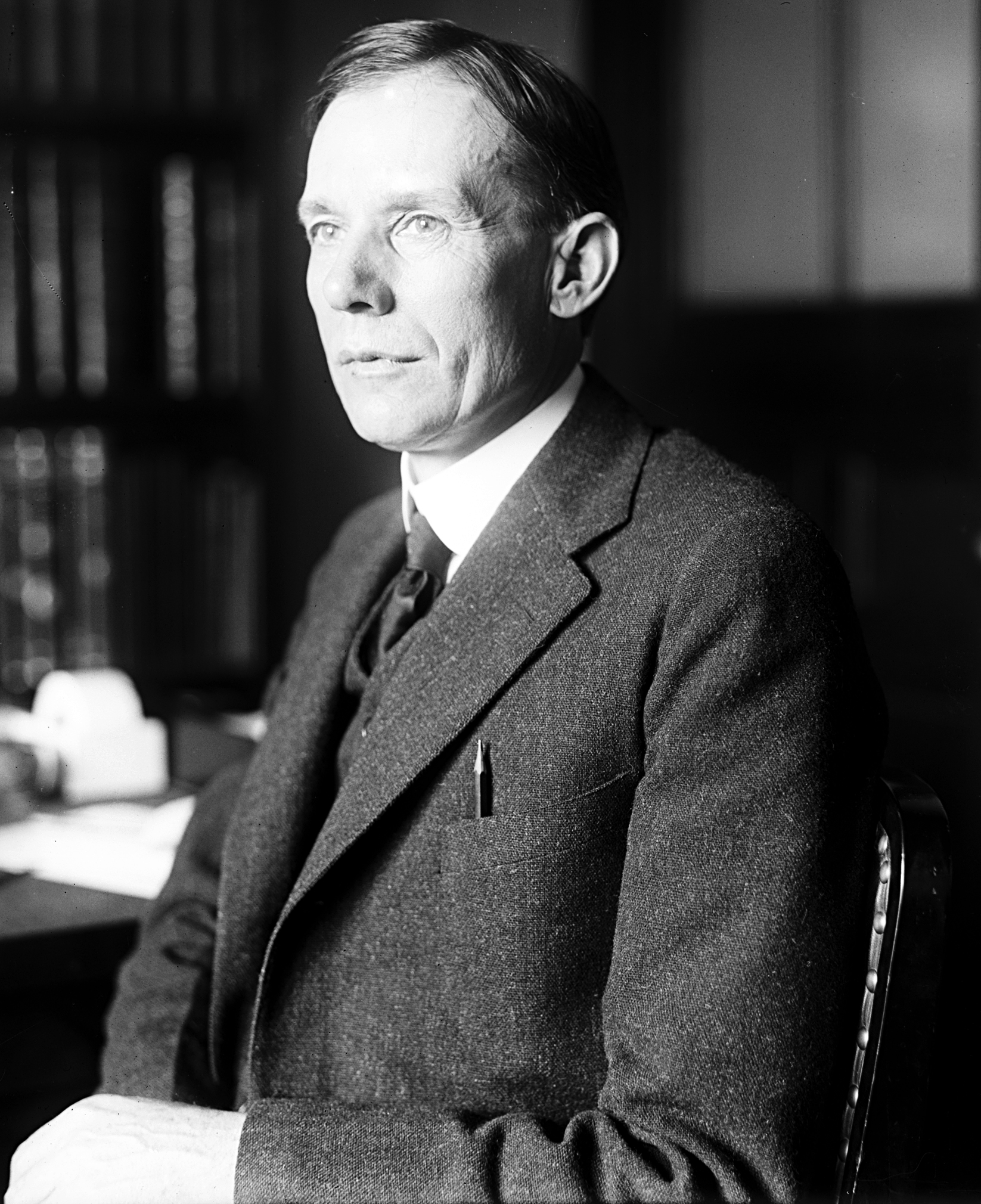

Member of the U.S. House of Representatives from North Carolina
- In office March 4, 1917 – March 1, 1919
- Preceded by: James J. Britt
- Succeeded by: James J. Britt
- Constituency: 10th district
- In office March 4, 1919 – March 3, 1929
- Preceded by: James J. Britt
- Succeeded by: George M. Pritchard
- Constituency: 10th district
- In office March 4, 1931 – January 3, 1947
- Preceded by: George M. Pritchard
- Succeeded by: Monroe M. Redden
- Constituency: 10th district (1931–1933); 11th district (1933–1943); 12th district (1943–1947)

Personal details
- Born: May 12, 1872 Weaverville, North Carolina, U.S.
- Died: October 29, 1948 (aged 76)
- Party: Democratic
- Relations: Weaver family
- Education: Weaver College; University of North Carolina (JD)

Zebulon Weaver (May 12, 1872 – October 29, 1948) was an American lawyer and politician who served 14 terms as a Democratic U.S. Congressman from North Carolina between 1917 and 1929 and again between 1931 and 1947.

== Early years and education ==
Born in Weaverville, North Carolina, Weaver attended public schools, Weaver College, and then the University of North Carolina at Chapel Hill, where he studied law. He was admitted to the bar in 1894 and practiced law in Asheville, North Carolina.

He was the grandson of Montraville Weaver, founder of Weaverville, and great-grandson of the first European settler of the Reems Creek valley, Dutch-born John Weaver.

== Political career ==
Weaver was elected to the North Carolina House of Representatives in 1906 and 1908 before being elected to the North Carolina Senate in 1912, serving a single term.

He was elected to the U.S. House from North Carolina's 10th congressional district in 1916 in an extremely close race that he initially won by only 8 votes. His election was contested by James J. Britt, who argued that 90 ballots in which voters submitted a party ballot, but did not mark the box on it, should not have been counted. The majority of the House committee that considered the case disagreed with Britt, but in an unusual turn when resolutions were brought to the floor of the House, the House adopted the resolution of the minority and decided that Weaver was not elected and to swear in Britt. The House was extremely close in the 65th Congress, with the Democratic-coalition holding only a 2-seat majority at the end, and many House members were absent, so the final resolution was carried by a scant 185–183 vote. The case took so long that Britt was only seated for the last three days (between March 1, 1919, and March 3, 1919) of the 65th United States Congress.

Weaver was then elected to four more Congresses until he was defeated for re-election in 1928 by Republican George M. Pritchard. He recaptured his seat in 1930 and served eight more terms in Congress (March 4, 1931 – January 3, 1947) until losing a battle for the renomination in 1946. He returned to practicing law in Asheville until his death in 1948. During his tenure in office, Weaver was responsible for the bill that resulted in the creation of the Great Smoky Mountains National Park.

Gertrude Dills McKee, later to become the first female member of the North Carolina State Senate, supported his reelection efforts in 1928; it was her first experience in politics.

== Personal life ==
Weaver had a son named Zebulon V. Weaver who, in 1929, was appointed as one of the original 27 Patrolmen of the North Carolina Highway Patrol. He served until about 1931 when he resigned to further his education, and became a successful lawyer.

Weaver was a member of the Knights of Pythias.

U.S. House of Representatives
Preceded by James Britt	Member of the U.S. House of Representatives from North Carolina's 10th congressional district 1917–1919	Succeeded by James Britt
Preceded by James J. Britt	Member of the U.S. House of Representatives from North Carolina's 10th congressional district 1919–1929	Succeeded by George M. Pritchard
Preceded by George Pritchard	Member of the U.S. House of Representatives from North Carolina's 10th congressional district 1931–1933	Succeeded by Alfred Bulwinkle
Preceded by none (new district)	Member of the U.S. House of Representatives from North Carolina's 11th congressional district 1933–1943	Succeeded by Alfred L. Bulwinkle
Preceded by none (new district)	Member of the U.S. House of Representatives from North Carolina's 12th congressional district 1943–1947	Succeeded by Monroe M. Redden
