= Brevard College =

Private college in Brevard, North Carolina, U.S.

- Former names: Weaver College (1853–1934); Rutherford College (1853–1934); Brevard Institute (1895–1933)
- Motto: Cognosce ut prosis
- Motto in English: Learn in Order to Serve
- Type: Private college
- Established: 1853; 173 years ago (predecessor); 1934; 92 years ago (as Brevard College)
- Affiliations: NCICU, NAICU, NASCUMC
- Endowment: $28.2 million (2019)
- President: Bradley Andrews
- Academic staff: 55
- Administrative staff: 118
- Students: 780 (fall 2021)
- Location: Brevard, North Carolina, U.S. 35.238°N 82.729°W
- Colors: Royal Blue & White
- Nickname: Tornados
- Sporting affiliations: NCAA Division III – USA South
- Mascot: Tornado
- Website: brevard.edu

Brevard College is a private college in Brevard, North Carolina, United States. The college grants Bachelor of Arts, Bachelor of Science, and Master of Science degrees.

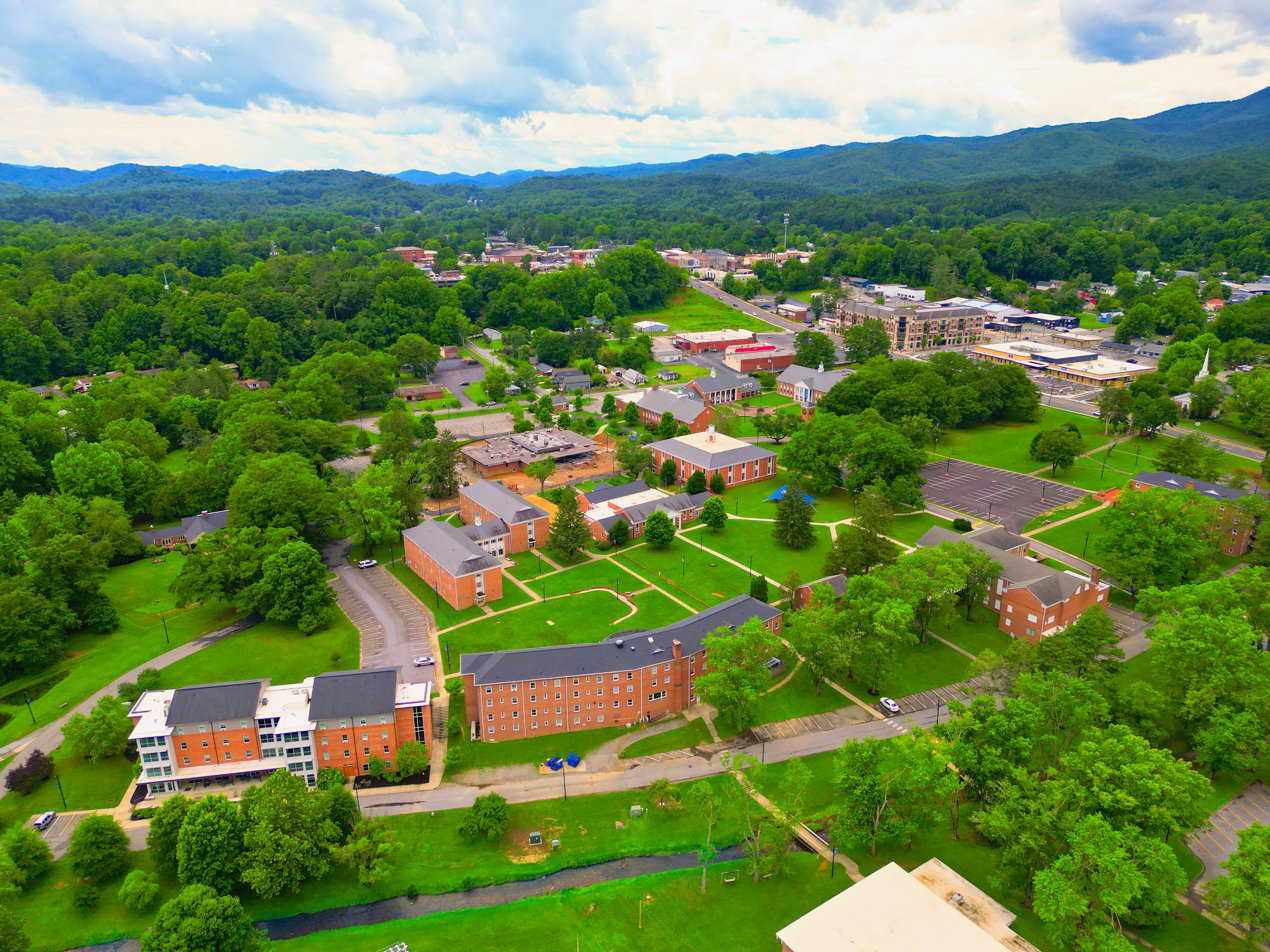
Aerial of Brevard College campus

== History ==
Brevard College was named for Ephraim Brevard, a teacher and one of the local leaders that produced the Mecklenburg Resolves/Mecklenburg Declaration of Independence in 1775. Brevard College traces its origins to three institutions: "Weaver College", a two- and four-year school, which was founded in Weaverville in 1853 by the "Brothers of Temperance;" and named for the town's founder, Montraville Weaver. "Rutherford College", which was founded as the Owl Hollow School in 1853 in Burke County (and gave its name to Rutherford College, North Carolina); and the "Brevard Institute", a high school inaugurated in 1895 by Asheville businessman Fitch Taylor and his wife, Sarah.

In 1933, the Western North Carolina Annual Conference decided to merge Weaver and Rutherford Colleges to create a single coeducational Methodist Junior college on the site of the old Brevard Institute. In fall of 1934, Brevard College was established after five Weaver faculty and 30 Weaver students moved to the new location as part of an opening that included 24 faculty and 394 students.

The Brevard College Stone Fence and Gate was erected by the Works Progress Administration in 1936-1937 and listed on the National Register of Historic Places in 1993.

== Campus ==
=== Library ===
J. A. Jones Library, named after James Addison Jones, serves students at Brevard College and supports community borrowers as well. In addition to its print and digital collections, it provides historical information on Transylvania County, study accommodations for group or individual work in public or private space, classrooms for library instruction, and interlibrary loan privileges.

J. A. Jones Library is a member of the American Library Association, Appalachian College Association, Carolina Consortium, Lyrasis, and North Carolina Independent Colleges and Universities.

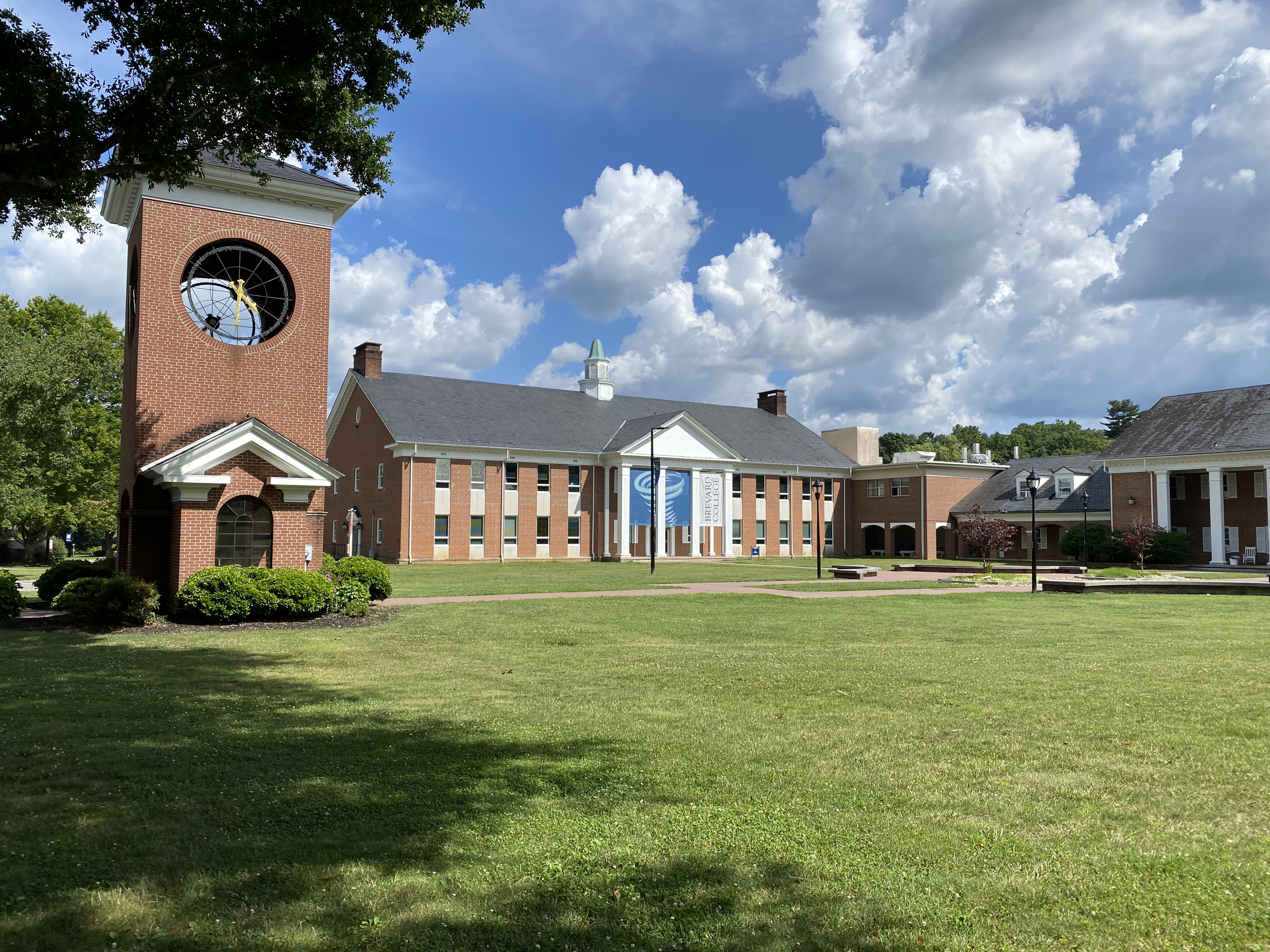
Brevard College campus

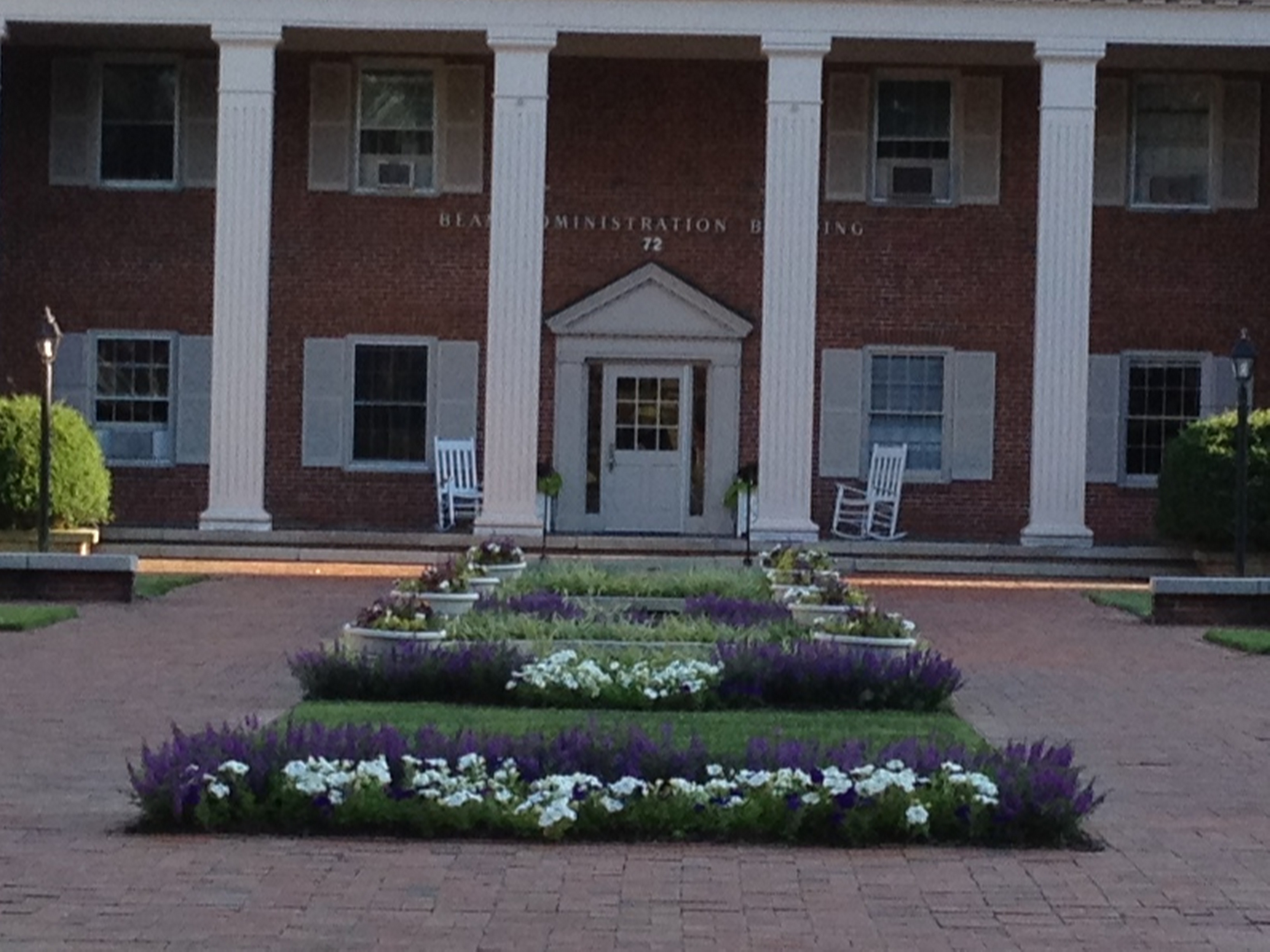
Administration building

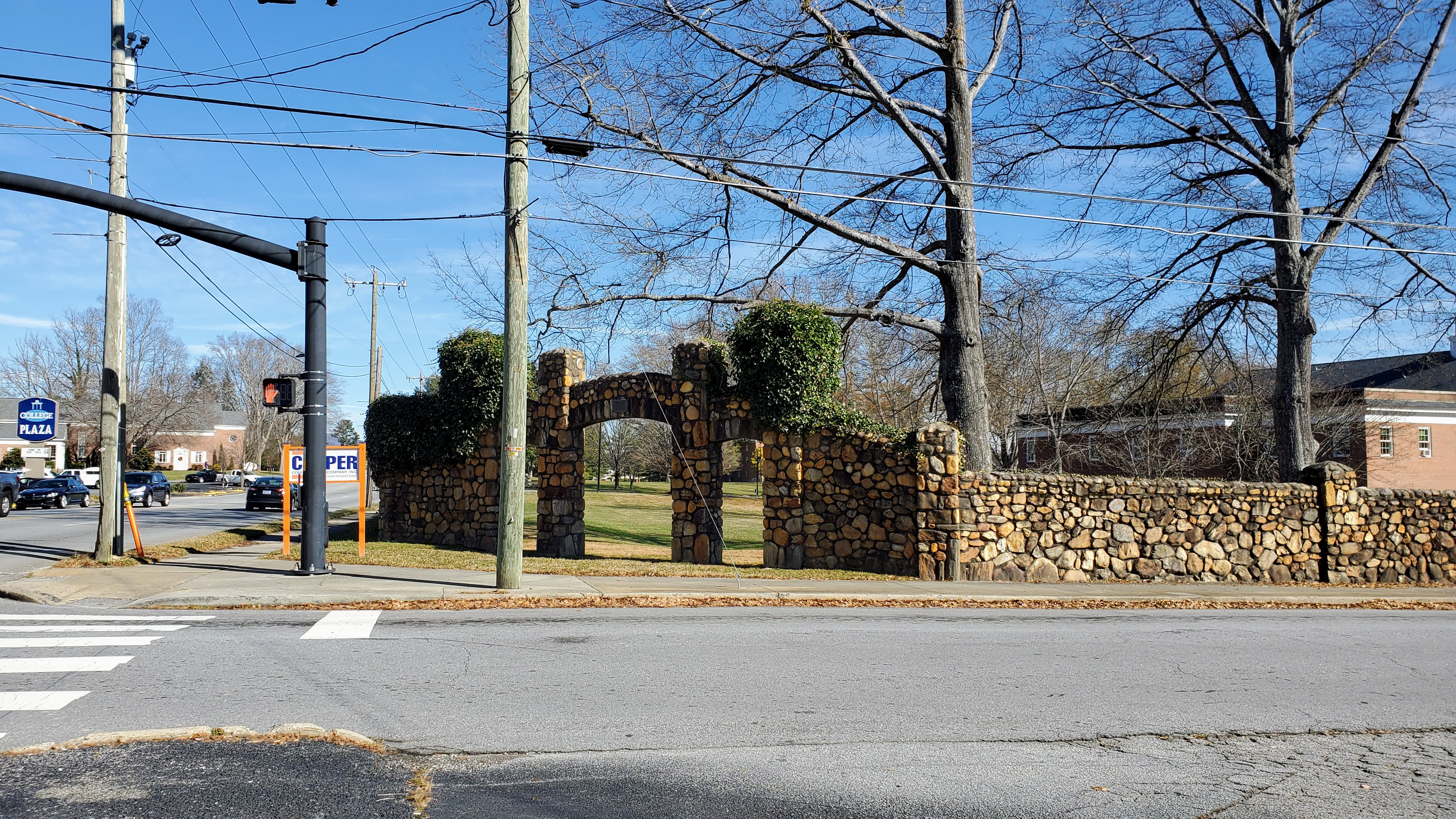
Stone fence and gate

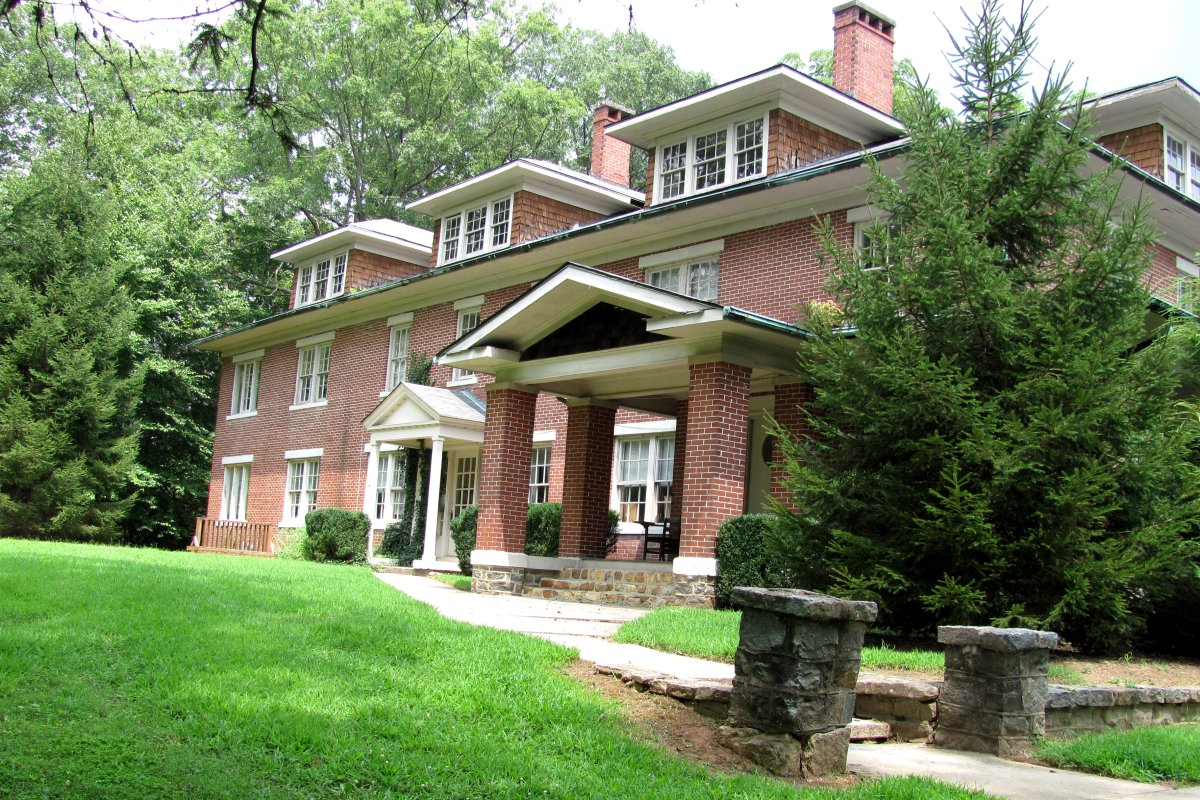
Ross Hall

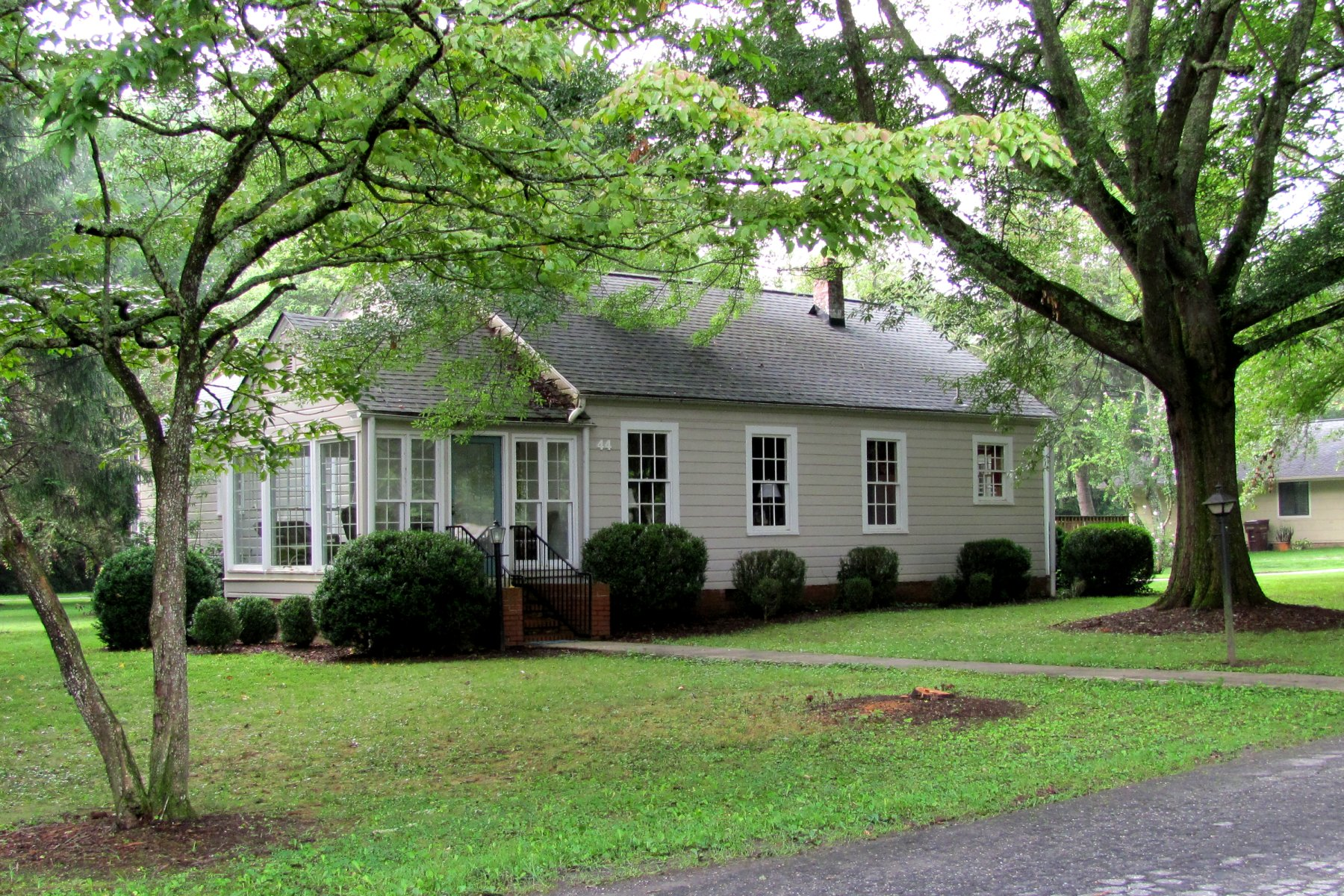
Guest house

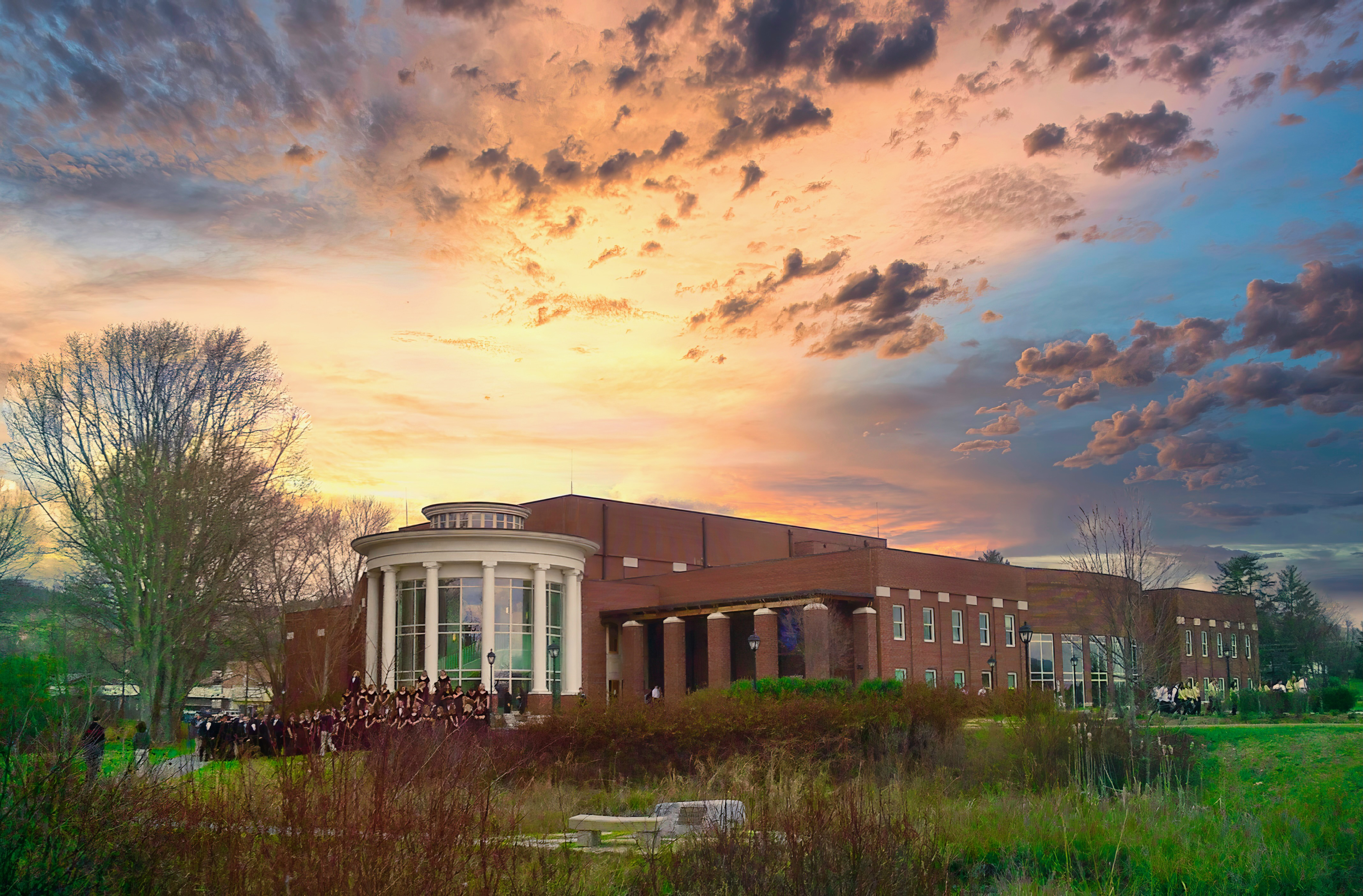
Porter Center concert hall and theatre

== Athletics ==
Brevard athletics logo

The Brevard athletic teams are called the Tornados. The college is a member of the NCAA Division III ranks, primarily competing in the USA South Athletic Conference (USA South) since the 2017–18 academic year. The Tornados previously competed in the South Atlantic Conference (SAC) of the NCAA Division II ranks from 2007–08 to 2016–17; as an NCAA D-II Independent during the 2006–07 school year; and in the Appalachian Athletic Conference (AAC) of the National Association of Intercollegiate Athletics (NAIA) from 2000–01 to 2005–06.

Brevard competes in 21 intercollegiate varsity sports: Men's sports compete in baseball, basketball, cheerleading, cross country, cycling, football, lacrosse, soccer, tennis and track & field; while women's sports include basketball, cheerleading, cross country, cycling, dance, lacrosse, soccer, softball, tennis, track & field and volleyball.

The fall of 2006 saw the college field a football team for the first time since the 1950s.

Disc golf is also a popular leisure activity on campus; Brevard competes in several annual tournaments with other local colleges.

In 2009, the Tornados mountain biking team (in only their third season) won their first national championship after improving on a fourth-place finish in 2008 and an eighth-place finish in 2007. The team won their second national championship in 2010. In 2012, the team won their third national championship.
