= James Jefferson Britt =

American politician (1861–1939)

James J. Britt
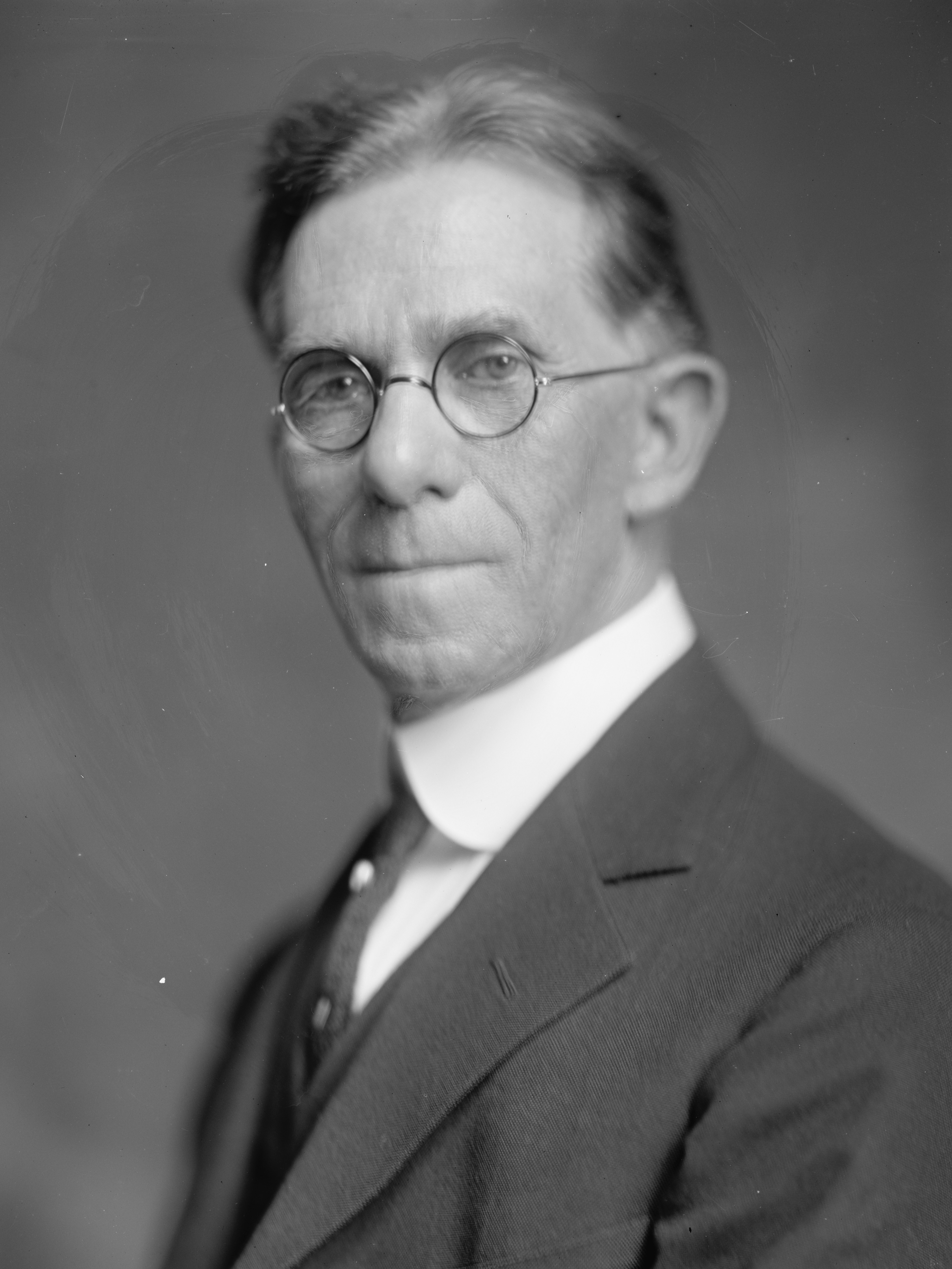

Member of the U.S. House of Representatives from North Carolina's 10th district
- In office March 4, 1915 – March 3, 1917
- Preceded by: James M. Gudger, Jr.
- Succeeded by: Zebulon Weaver
- In office March 1, 1919 – March 3, 1919
- Preceded by: Zebulon Weaver
- Succeeded by: Zebulon Weaver

Member of the North Carolina Senate
- In office 1909–1911

Personal details
- Born: James Jefferson Britt; March 4, 1861 Unicoi County, Tennessee, U.S.
- Died: December 26, 1939 (aged 78) Asheville, North Carolina, U.S.
- Resting place: Riverside Cemetery
- Party: Republican
- Education: University of North Carolina at Chapel Hill
- Occupation: Lawyer, politician

James Jefferson Britt (March 4, 1861 – December 26, 1939) was an American educator and politician who served one term as a United States representative in Congress from North Carolina from 1915 to 1917.

== Biography ==
James Jefferson Britt was born near Johnson City, Tennessee, in present-day Unicoi County on March 4, 1861. He attended the common schools and studied under private tutors.

=== Early career ===
He was principal of Burnsville (N.C.) Academy from 1886 to 1893. He was then superintendent of the public schools of Mitchell County 1894-1896 and headmaster of Bowman Academy, Bakersville, N.C., 1895–1896.

Britt was deputy collector of internal revenue at Asheville, N.C., 1896–1899. He studied law at the University of North Carolina at Chapel Hill, he was admitted to the bar in 1900 and commenced practice in Asheville.

=== Political career ===
He was a delegate to the 1904 Republican National Convention. He was an unsuccessful candidate for election in 1906 to the Sixtieth Congress but was a special assistant United States attorney in 1906 and 1907. Britt became a member of the North Carolina Senate from 1909 to 1911, he was part of the special counsel to the Post Office Department from July 1, 1909, to December 1, 1910. He was again special assistant to the Attorney General from July 13, 1910, to December 1, 1910.

Britt was appointed Third Assistant Postmaster General by President Taft on December 1, 1910, and served until March 17, 1913.

=== Congress ===
He was elected as a Republican to the Sixty-fourth Congress (March 4, 1915 – March 3, 1917).

The 1916 election to the Sixty-fifth Congress was an extremely close race, which he initially lost by only 8 votes to Democrat Zebulon Weaver. Britt contested the elections, arguing that 90 ballots in which voters submitted a party ballot, but did not mark the box on it, should not have been counted. The majority of the House committee that considered the case disagreed with Britt, but in an unusual turn when resolutions were brought to the floor of the House, the House adopted the resolution of the minority and decided that Britt was elected and to be sworn in. The House was extremely close in the 65th Congress, with the Democratic-coalition holding only a 2-seat majority at the end, and many House members were absent, so the final resolution was carried by a scant 185–183 vote. The case took so long that Britt was seated only for the final days of Congress, serving from March 1, 1919, to March 3, 1919.

Although contesting the previous election ultimately seated Britt in Congress, he was not in office at the time of his re-election bid in 1918 and lost his race for the Sixty-sixth Congress.

=== Later career ===
He resumed the practice of law in Asheville, N.C. and served as chief counsel for the Bureau of Prohibition, Treasury Department, 1922–1932. Britt was an unsuccessful candidate for the position of chief justice for the North Carolina Supreme Court in 1926. He once again resumed the practice of law in 1933.

=== Death and burial ===
James J. Britt died on December 26, 1939, in Asheville, N.C. and was interred in Riverside Cemetery.

U.S. House of Representatives
Preceded by James M. Gudger, Jr.	Member of the U.S. House of Representatives from North Carolina's 10th congressional district 1915–1917	Succeeded by Zebulon Weaver
Preceded by Zebulon Weaver	Member of the U.S. House of Representatives from North Carolina's 10th congressional district 1919	Succeeded by Zebulon Weaver
