= Ideas Have Consequences =

1948 book by Richard M. Weaver

- First edition
- Author: Richard M. Weaver
- Language: English
- Subject: Philosophy
- Publisher: University of Chicago Press
- Publication date: 1948
- Publication place: United States
- Media type: Print (Paperback)
- Pages: 190
- ISBN: 0-226-87680-2
- OCLC: 11120554

Ideas Have Consequences is a philosophical work by Richard M. Weaver, published in 1948 by the University of Chicago Press. The book is largely a treatise on the harmful effects of nominalism on Western civilization since this doctrine gained prominence in the Late Middle Ages, followed by a prescription of a course of action through which Weaver believes the West might be rescued from its decline.

== Epistemology and approach ==
Weaver rejects the notion that the axioms underlying a human belief system can be arbitrary exercises of ultimate choice not anchored in objective realities without that system declining and ultimately failing. Accordingly, Weaver attacks nominalism using historical analogy and the teleological implications, or "consequences" of such a world view.

It is important, however, to distinguish this approach from that of historicism, which contends that history unfolds in deterministic cycles. Weaver emphasizes his position that the cause of apparent patterns in the decline of civilizations is the recurring replacement of "an ontological division [of the cosmos] by categories" with "a study of signification ... [in which the] words no longer correspond to objective realities."

== The decline of the West ==
Weaver attributes the beginning of the Western decline to the adoption of nominalism (or the rejection of the notion of absolute truth) in the late Scholastic period. The chief proponent of this philosophical revolution was William of Ockham.

The consequences of this revolution, Weaver contends, were the gradual erosion of the notions of distinction and hierarchy, and the subsequent enfeebling of the Western mind's capacity to reason. These effects in turn produced all manner of societal ills, decimating Western art, education and morality.

As examples of the most recent and extreme consequences of this revolution, Weaver offers the cruelty of the Hiroshima bombing, the meaninglessness of modern art, America's cynicism and apathy in the face of the just war against Nazism, and the rise of what he terms "The Great Stereopticon".

== The Great Stereopticon ==
Weaver gives the name "The Great Stereopticon" to what he perceives as a rising, emergent construct which serves to manipulate the beliefs and emotions of the populace, and ultimately to separate them from their humanity via "the commodification of truth".

Here, notably, Weaver echoes the sentiments of C. S. Lewis in his book The Abolition of Man (which was written nearly contemporaneously with Ideas Have Consequences), and anticipates the modern critique of consumerism.

== Prescription ==
Weaver concludes his book by proposing that deliberate measures might be taken to begin the regeneration of Western civilization. Among these, he proposes that language be reinvested with value, and that the right to private property, which he dubs "the last metaphysical right", be maintained, among other things because it provides a material basis for human sustenance and thus furnishes an individual (as it did Henry David Thoreau) with the means to be independent from a corrupt system.

== Chapters summary ==
Chapter 1: The Unsentimental Sentiment Every man in a culture has three levels of conscious reflection: his specific ideas about things, his general beliefs, and his metaphysical dream. The first constitutes his worldliness, the second is applied to certain choices as they present themselves and the third which is the most important is his intuitive feeling about the immanent nature of reality. Without this it is impossible to live together harmoniously for prolonged amounts of time. It is also his attitude toward the world and is the most important fact about a person.

Logic depends upon this dream, for the waning of the dream results in the confusion of counsel. Today many think that it does not matter what a man believes, but it does. What a man believes tells him what the world is for. If people can’t agree what the world is for, they can never agree on all the little things in life either. People are generally reluctant for others to take what they believe too seriously. This is how religion is currently viewed. Our various thoughts and assumptions about ideas are what give them meaning. Our ideas must be harmonized by some vision. Our task is to find that harmonization.

Chapter 2: Distinction and Hierarchy The most ominous event of our time is that people are steadily doing away with the distinctions which themselves create society. The preservation of society is directly linked with the recovery of knowledge. Society has structure and hierarchy which is determined by distinctions. People are becoming more and more overcome with the idea that in a just society there are no distinctions and everyone is equal. But people are engaged in self-promotion, contradicting that there are no distinctions. How can there be equality between sexes and ages? The basis of an organic society is a fraternity which unites parts that are distinct. Democracy presumes hierarchy and discrimination. Authority goes to knowledge.

Chapter 3: Fragmentation and Obsession Our culture has lost many values and those who want to restore those values are often told that they are trying to regress or turn back the hands of time. Values though are not affected by time and thus can be re-attained through the right process. In looking for values we are looking for truth. We have lost sight of true knowledge. Our leaders have come in three stages. The first was the philosophic doctor. He was the best, for he was the possessor of the highest learning. At the point of this ruler there was a great interest in Humanities and Liberal arts. Next came the gentleman. He was the second best. He was an Idealist with self- restraint . His only shortcoming was that he had lost sight of the spiritual origin of self-discipline. In this time ideals existed and Ideals are of supreme importance. Last and worst was the specialist. He ignored all circles of knowledge except a particular field in which he immersed himself. In this time men are lost without their particular fields of experience. Men are partially developed which means essentially that they are deformed. Deformed people are the last one who should be rulers. Fact has taken the place of truth. Authority is flawed and not to be trusted.

Chapter 4: Egotism in Work and Art Egotism is making one’s self the measure of value. One such man does not need to obey the laws of other men and can do what he will with his life. This sort of thinking leads inevitably into selfishness. Plato said that such a man would judge himself wrongly and choose his own interest over the truth. To the medieval man the path of learning was a path of self-deprecation; and knowledge prepared the way for self-effacement. The basis for internal pride is the seeking of a sort of salvation through knowledge. There is no necessity in the absence of truth. One type of fidelity is realizing an ideal. According to an egotistic mindset, the less communal programs in order to ensure self-inspired demands, the better. When divine laws are ignored and everything is seen to be man’s contrivance, the egotistic man will try to claw his way to the top of society. Some seek this sort of salvation through forms and so escape responsibilities. When disciplines are disregarded he tries to avoid responsibilities by claiming some sort of "progress". The failure to maintain internal discipline in a leader is followed by a rationalized single powerful will.

Chapter 5: The Great Stereopticon Those below the level of philosophy are ones to make the first effort to repair the damage. But their efforts have no effect because they attempt the repair by a physical means. Disintegration brings about, for our leaders, a problem of how to persuade to communal activity people who no longer have the same ideas about the most fundamental things. There can be no reconciliation between authority and individual will. The solution these leaders chose was to replace religion with education which was a systematic indoctrination through channels of information and entertainment. In comes the Great Stereopticon. This machine serves the function of projecting selected pictures of life in the hope that they will be imitated. It is today a machine of three parts, having been progressively improved. The three parts are: The Press, The Motion Picture, and The Radio. It is an ideal servant of progress. The problem with this machine is that the data it gives takes its significance from a sickly metaphysical dream. The ultimate source of evaluation becomes the dream of psychopathic, fragmentation, disharmony, and nonbeing. "The Great Stereopticon keeps the ordinary citizen from perceiving ’the vanity of his bookkeeping and the emptiness of his domestic felicities.’"

Chapter 6: The Spoiled-Child Psychology The author realizes, "HAVING been taught for four centuries, more or less, that his redemption lies through the conquest of nature, man expects his heaven to be spatial and temporal, and, beholding all things through the Great Stereopticon, he expects redemption to be easy of attainment. Only by these facts can we explain the spoiled-child psychology of the urban masses." The author notes, "[H]e has received concessions at enough points to think that he may obtain what he wishes through complaints and demands." And concerning the determinant confrontation with the Soviet Ease, the author writes, "Thus a great decision confronting the West in the future is how to overcome the spoiled-child psychology sufficiently to discipline for struggle." And he concludes, "In the final analysis this society is like the spoiled child in its incapacity to think. Anyone can observe in the pampered children of the rich a kind of irresponsibility of the mental process."

Chapter 7: The Last Metaphysical Right This chapter, and those following, is about means of restoration, i.e., remedies. "A primary object of those who wish to restore society is the demassing of the masses, and in this the role of property is paramount." The author explains the title, "We say the right of private property is metaphysical because it does not depend on any test of social usefulness." And then he warns against the gravity of the situation, "It is not a little disquieting to realize that in private property there survives the last domain of privacy of any kind." And if we choose to know and will, then "The moral solution is the distributive ownership of small properties. These take the form of independent farms, of local businesses, of homes owned by the occupants, where individual responsibility gives significance to prerogative over property. Such ownership provides a range of volition through which one can be a complete person, and it is the abridgment of this volition for which monopoly capitalism must be condemned along with communism."

Chapter 8: The Power of the Word The author introduces the message of the chapter by a reference to Saint John. He writes, "The central teaching of the New Testament is that those who accept the word acquire wisdom". The main argument here is the critique of modern semanticists. He observes, "In recognizing that words have power to define and to compel, the semanticists are actually testifying to the philosophic quality of language which is the source of their vexation." And then he goes on to identify two dangerous phenomena: The attack upon the symbolic operations of language and the decay of honorifics (in forms of address!) The author declares that he is "ready to assert that we can never break out of the circle of language and seize the object barehanded, as it were, or without some ideational operation." Which is why "It is difficult, therefore, to overrate the importance of skill in language." And, "Poetry offers the fairest hope of restoring our lost unity of mind." In conclusion, the author suggests, "Since man necessarily uses both the poetical and the logical resources of speech, he needs a twofold training. The first part must be devoted to literature and rhetoric, the second to logic and dialectic."

Chapter 9: Piety and Justice "Piety is a discipline of the will through respect. It admits the right to exist of things larger than the ego, of things different from the ego. And, before we can bring harmony back […] we shall have to regard with the spirit of piety three things: nature, our neighbors—by which I mean all other people—and the past." Regarding nature, the author warns, "Triumphs against the natural order of living exact unforeseen payments… Our planet is falling victim to a rigorism, so that what is done in any remote corner affects—nay, menaces—the whole. Resiliency and tolerance are lost." Regarding neighbors, "Knowledge disciplines egotism so that one credits the reality of other selves… But to have enough imagination to see into other lives and enough piety to realize that their existence is a part of beneficent creation is the very foundation of human community." And regarding the past, "in so far as we are creatures of reflection, we have only the past… Awareness of the past is an antidote to both egotism and shallow optimism." Toward the conclusion, and concerning women, the author affirms, "once again equality destroys fraternity". Restoration comes at a price, "Yet it is the duty of those who can foresee the end of a saturnalia to make their counsel known."

== Edition in print ==
- University of Chicago Press, 2013: ISBN 9780226090061 The original 1948 text published as an "Expanded Edition" with a new foreword (titled "The Consequences of Richard Weaver") by Roger Kimball and an afterword ("How Ideas Have Consequences Came to be Written") by Ted J. Smith, III.
- Blackstone Audiobooks, 1997 audio cassette tape: ISBN 0-7861-0640-9
- Blackstone Audiobooks, 2008 CD: ISBN 1-4332-5465-4
