= Albert R. Newsome =

American historian

Albert Ray Newsome (1894–1951) was an American author, editor, educator, and historian in North Carolina, and served as chairman of the University of North Carolina at Chapel Hill’s Department of History. Newsome also served as the first president of the Society of American Archivists from 1936 to 1939.

He co-authored North Carolina: The History of a Southern State along with Hugh Talmage Lefler in 1954. In 1996, Newsome’s grandson Christopher Quackenbush established “The Albert Ray Newsome Distinguished Professorship for the Study of the South".

== Early life ==
Newsome was born on June 4, 1894, in Marshville, North Carolina to Richard Clyde and Julia Ross Newsome.

== Education ==
In 1915, Newsome graduated from the University of North Carolina at the top of his class. He then taught history in their public school system for a few years, along with teaching at Bessie Tift College in Georgia. He then earned a doctoral degree from the University of Michigan.

== Academia ==
In 1923, Newsome returned to UNC as an assistant professor. In 1926, he accepted a post as the Secretary of the NC Historical Commission, now called the State Department of Archives and History.

Newsome returned to University of North Carolina at Chapel Hill in 1936, when he became their chairman of the History Department. He also served as the first president of the Society of American Archivists between 1936 and 1939.
