= Brevard College Stone Fence and Gate =

- U.S. National Register of Historic Places
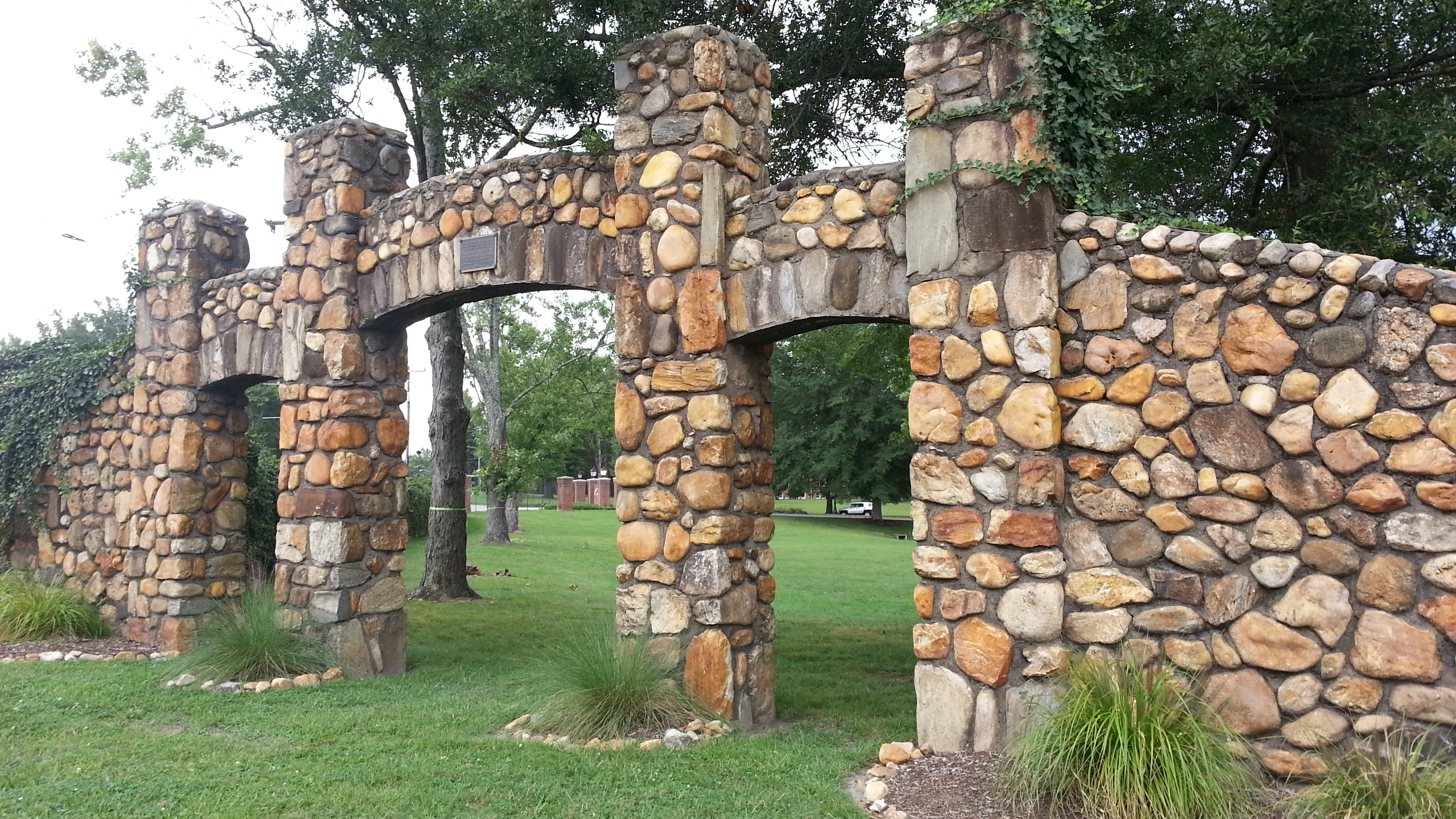
- Brevard College Stone Fence and Gate, September 2012

- Location within North Carolina Location within the United States
- Location: Jct. of N. Broad St. and French Broad Ave., NW corner, Brevard, North Carolina
- Coordinates: 35°14′18″N 82°43′50″W
- Area: less than one acre
- Built: 1936-1937
- Built by: Unknown; WPA
- Architectural style: Bungalow/craftsman
- MPS: Transylvania County MPS
- NRHP reference No.: 93001436
- Added to NRHP: December 21, 1993

Brevard College Stone Fence and Gate is a historic stone fence and gate located on the campus of Brevard College at Brevard, Transylvania County, North Carolina. It was erected by the Works Progress Administration in 1936–1937 to enclose the athletic field. The L-shaped structure consists of a diagonally set arcaded gate, flanked by walls measuring about 222 feet and about 252 feet in length.

It was listed on the National Register of Historic Places in 1993.
