= John Weaver (writer) =

American writer

John Weaver (June 18, 1869 – August 31, 1954) was a locally prolific American writer, storyteller, farmer, surveyor, Democratic politician and postmaster from Cosby, Cocke County, Tennessee known for documenting local history and his communal involvement.

From 1909 to 1951, Weaver was active in publishing topical pieces in various local newspapers such as the Newport Times, Plains Talk and Tribune. His pieces regularly involved Cocke County history, specifically regarding the Civil War, as well as the history of local families.

== Family ==
John's father William Thomas Weaver (1821–1903) was a Confederate veteran and son of early Cosby settler Deacon John Weaver I, a local yeoman and member of the Weaverville, North Carolina Weaver family.
